= Benteng language =

Malay-based creole language

Benteng
- Benteng Malay; Malay dialect of Benteng Chinese
- Basa Bénténg
- Native to: Indonesia
- Region: Banten (Tangerang City, Tangerang Regency, South Tangerang City); West Java (Bogor Regency); Jakarta (West Jakarta)
- Ethnicity: Benteng Chinese
- Native speakers: unknown
- Language family: Malay-based creole: Betawic (?); Benteng

Language codes
- ISO 639-3: None (mis)
- Glottolog: None
- Locations where the Benteng language is spoken

Benteng language (basa Bénténg; also known as Benteng Malay or Malay dialect of Benteng Chinese) is a variety of Malay-based creole (related to Betawi language) spoken by the Benteng Chinese community in the Greater Tangerang area and its surroundings. The community of speakers of this language is a Peranakan Chinese community who have lived for generations along the Cisadane River, as well as the upstream hinterland of Tangerang and parts of western Bogor Regency. This language is the result of a process of language contact and deep cultural acculturation between elements of Malay, Hokkien, and Sundanese. The Tangerang City Government through the Department of Culture and Tourism has even studied the Benteng language to be proposed as one of Indonesia's Intangible Cultural Heritage (Warisan Budaya Takbenda; WBTb) to the Ministry of Culture of the Republic of Indonesia.

== History ==
The history of the formation of the Benteng language cannot be separated from the arrival of the ancestors of the Benteng Chinese community on the north coast of Tangerang, which was recorded in 1407, when the group of ships related to the timeline of Admiral Cheng Ho's expedition landed in Teluknaga. These early immigrants settled and many entered into mixed marriages with local Sundanese women. This natural blending that has taken place over hundreds of years has given birth to new social entities that are culturally influenced by local culture but still maintain respect for their Chinese ancestors. The name "Benteng" (lit. 'Fort') itself comes from the existence of a fort belonging to the Dutch East India Company (VOC), which was built around the 1670s on the banks of the Cisadane River to withstand attacks from the Banten Sultanate, so that the Peranakan people who lived in the area around the fort were nicknamed the Benteng Chinese (lit. 'Fortress Chinese') or the Benteng people (lit. 'Fortress people'). Over time, intensive interaction with various linguistic variations around it formed a variety of Malay-based creole language, which is marked by the influence of Tangerang Sundanese and the absorption of Hokkien which they brought from their ancestral land.

== Geographic distribution ==
Benteng language is spoken in a scattered manner in several enclaves of traditional settlements of the Benteng Chinese community in the Tangerang City, Tangerang Regency, South Tangerang City areas, to the border area of Bogor Regency and West Jakarta. In Tangerang City, the area where this language is spoken includes the districts of Karawaci (Cimone, Gerendeng, Karawaci, and Pasar Baru sub-districts), Tangerang (Sukaasih, Sukarasa, and Sukasari sub-districts), Neglasari (Kedaung Wetan, Mekarsari, and Neglasari sub-districts), Benda (Belendung, Benda, and Jurumudi sub-districts), and Batuceper (Batuceper sub-district). In South Tangerang City, this language is spoken in the district of Serpong, namely in the Serpong sub-district.

In Tangerang Regency, the area where this language is spoken is quite widespread, covering the districts of Cisauk (Dangdang village), Pagedangan (Cijantra village), Kelapa Dua (Bojong Nangka sub-district), Curug (Curug Wetan village), Legok (Cirarab village), Cikupa (Cikupa village), Panongan (Panongan and Rancaiyuh villages), Tigaraksa (Sodong village), Cisoka (Carenang village), Mauk (West Mauk and Tanjung Anom villages), Sukadiri (Kosambi village), Pakuhaji (Kohod village), East Sepatan (Kampung Kelor and West Kedaung villages), Teluknaga (Teluknaga, West Kampung Melayu, East Kampung Melayu, Pangkalan, Tanjung Burung, and Tegal Angus villages), and Kosambi (Cengklong village and Dadap sub-district). Traces of toponymy and the remains of old settlements of this community have also been identified in several other districts such as Balaraja (Cangkudu and Talagasari villages), North Serpong (Pondok Jagung sub-district), and Pondok Aren (Pondok Aren, West Pondok Kacang, and East Pondok Kacang sub-districts).

The Peranakan Chinese community outside the Greater Tangerang area which has close historical relations is in Bogor Regency, namely in Kampung Tarisi, Bagoang village of the district of Jasinga, Currently, the Peranakan community has completely switched to using Banten Sundanese. In addition, this community is also known for their involvement in the golok tarisi (a traditional sword) making center. Another closely related Peranakan Chinese community is in the district of Gunungsindur, where this community is spread across the villages of Gunungsindur (especially in Kampung Prumpung), Pabuaran, Cibadung, and Cibinong. In West Jakarta, the community of speakers of this language is mainly found in areas directly bordering or adjacent to Tangerang Regency and Tangerang City, especially in the districts of Kalideres, Kembangan, and Cengkareng.

== Usage ==
The grammar of the Benteng language is rooted in Malay, but it is flexible and greatly influenced by the local linguistic conditions where the community lives. The separation of cultural areas by the Cisadane River also influenced the linguistic conditions of the Benteng Chinese community, where the western part of the river tends to be closer to Sundanese culture and the eastern part is closer to Betawi culture. Most of the Benteng Chinese community lives in the Pasar Lama Tangerang (lit. 'Old Market of Tangerang') area (in the district of Tangerang), Karawaci, part of Neglasari, and most of Tangerang Regency have the ability to fluently use Tangerang Sundanese. Meanwhile, the Benteng Chinese community who live in the districts of Benda, Batuceper, Serpong, Teluknaga, Kosambi, part of Neglasari, East Sepatan, Pakuhaji, and parts of Gunungsindur (such as Kampung Prumpung and Cibinong village) mostly use Betawi language (Pinggiran dialect). Meanwhile, in the northern coastal areas such as the district of Mauk, the people are able to communicate using Mauk Javanese. For some of the Peranakan Chinese community in the district of Gunungsindur who live in the villages of Gunungsindur, Cibadung, and Pabuaran, mixing occurs between the local Sundanese dialect (transitional Bogor Sundanese and Banten Sundanese) and the Betawi language (Pinggiran dialect).

Lexically, the Benteng language absorbs a lot of vocabulary from various surrounding languages. One of the most robust vocabulary corpuses that has survived to the present day is the kinship terminology system which is dominated by loanwords from Hokkien. This kinship term strictly distinguishes between paternal (patrilineal) and maternal (matrilineal) lines of descent, and differentiate greetings based on birth order in the family. For example, to call the oldest brother the term kode is used, while the older brother is generally called koko, and the youngest brother is called kocit. This distinction also applies to the generation above (ego), such as paternal uncles (empek for father's older brother and cekcek for father's younger brother) and paternal aunts (ode for father's older sister, ocing for father's middle sister, and ocit for youngest sister). This linguistic reciprocal relationship is two-way; the Benteng language not only absorbs elements of Malay, Sundanese, and Javanese, but instead also contributes in the form of cultural loanwords to the local language structure.

== See also ==
- Benteng people
- Malay trade and creole languages
- Betawi language
- Tangerang Sundanese
