= Benteng people =

Chinese Indonesian community from Tangerang, Indonesia

Orang Tionghoa Benteng, Orang Cina Benteng
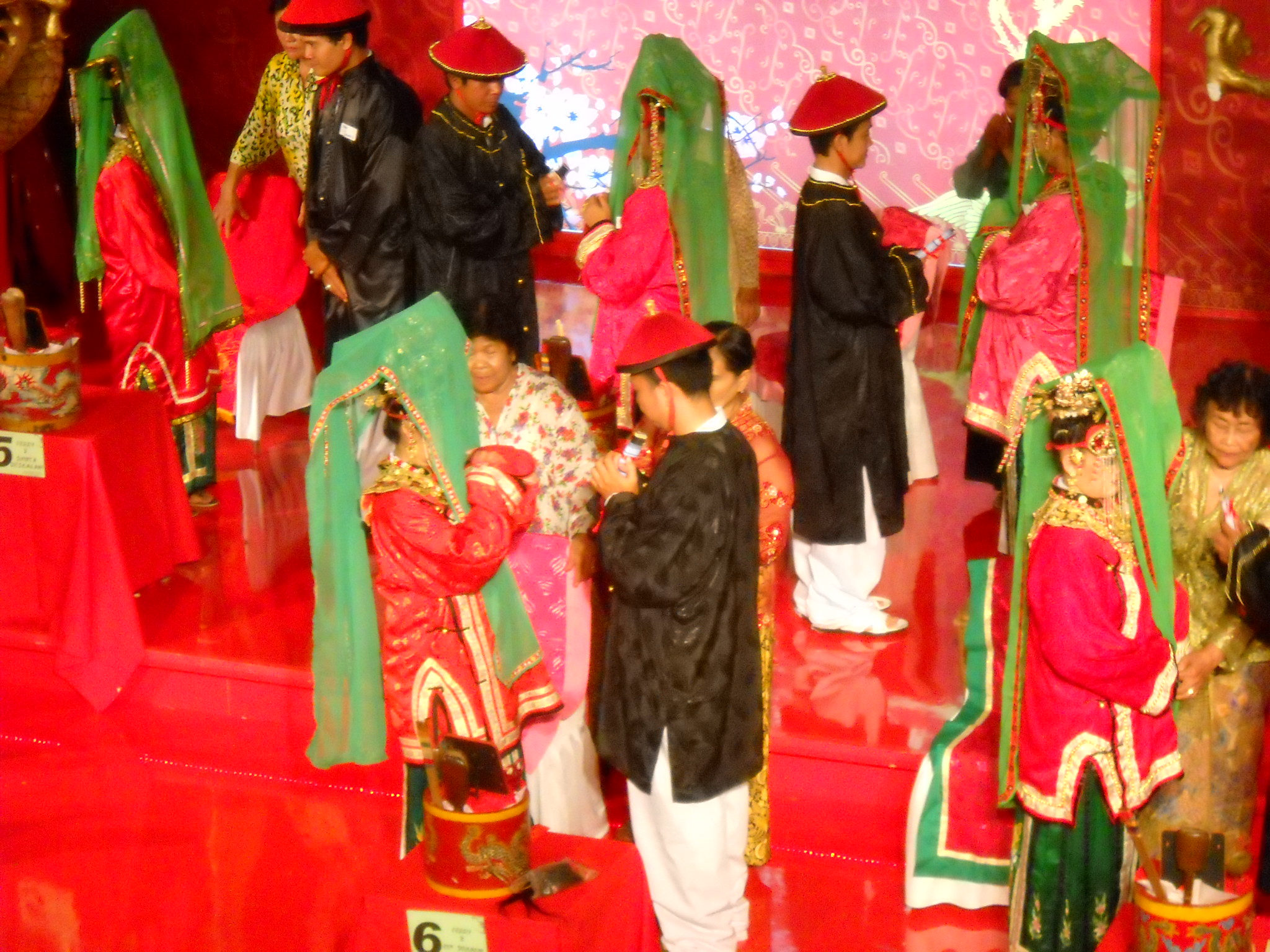
- Mass wedding ceremony of Benteng people, Jakarta, 2012

Total population
- 480,000

Regions with significant populations
- Indonesia (Tangerang) (Note: The distribution area mainly covers the following districts, such as Teluknaga, Neglasari, Sepatan, Curug, Karawaci, Cikupa, Tangerang, Batuceper, Kosambi, and Panongan.)

Languages
- Benteng, Betawi, Banten Sundanese, Indonesian

Religion
- Confucianism, Buddhism, Taoism, Christianity, Islam

Related ethnic groups
- Peranakans, Chinese Indonesians, Bantenese, Betawi, Sundanese

Benteng people (Indonesian: Orang Cina Benteng or Orang Tionghoa Benteng) are a Chinese Indonesian community of 'Peranakan' or mixed descent, native to the historical region of Tangerang in Indonesia, its current distribution includes Jakarta, Banten, and West Java.

== Etymology ==
The name 'Benteng' is derived from the Malay word for 'fortress', used formerly to refer to the historic Tangerang area. It refers to a colonial fortress on the banks of the Cisadane River, built by the Dutch East India Company in the seventeenth century as part of their defence system against the neighbouring Sultanate of Banten.

== History ==
=== Origin ===
According to a Sundanese manuscript Tina Layang Parahyang (Notes from Parahyangan), the Chinese community of Batavia and Tangerang has existed since at least 1407 CE. This manuscript recounts the arrival of among the earliest Chinese migrants to the area, led by a certain Tjen Tjie Lung, also dubbed 'Halung'. They landed at the mouth of the Cisadane River, now called Teluknaga (Dragon's Bay).

Subsequent waves of Chinese immigration from the seventeenth century onwards took place under the auspices of the Dutch East India Company. Boen Tek Bio, the oldest Chinese temple in Tangerang, was built by the community in 1684. Some Benteng Chinese trace their origin to those fleeing Batavia during the Chinese Massacre of 1740.

=== Contribution to Dutch colonialism ===
Many ethnic-Chinese allies and officials of the Dutch colonial authorities held office (see: Kapitan Cina), and owned landed estates (particuliere landerijen) in the historic Tangerang area. The historian Mona Lohanda, herself a Benteng Chinese, goes so far as to say that "Tangerang was practically a Chinese private domain" (p. 258). These landlords and bureaucrats also sponsored a large-scale migration of Chinese indentured laborers, who played a crucial role in the agricultural and economic development of the region.

=== Revolution ===
In the Indonesian Revolution from 1945 to 1949, tension rose between indigenous Indonesians and Benteng Chinese, who were perceived to be in favour of the Dutch colonial status quo. On 23 June 1946, riots targeting Benteng Chinese homes broke out in Tangerang, where revolutionary militiamen sympathetic to the Indonesian republican cause looted Chinese possessions, including Chinese prayer tables. These riots were apparently triggered by placement of an Indonesian flag with a Dutch flag by a Dutch colonial army soldier of Chinese descent.

Indonesian journalist Rosihan Anwar wrote in the Merdeka daily on 13 June 1946 that relationship between native and Chinese Indonesians had reached an all-time low. Conditions worsened after Pao An Tui, a pro-Dutch Benteng Chinese youth group, mobilized armed groups to evacuate Benteng Chinese residents to Batavia. Anti-Chinese rioting was successfully suppressed by the alliance of Pao An Tui and Dutch colonial troops.

At the time, nearly the entire Benteng Chinese population was displaced, and upon returning, they found that their properties were no longer intact: their land holdings had been confiscated or their homes had been looted.

Upon Indonesian independence, Tangerang was the last part of Java to be handed over to the Republic of Indonesia by the Dutch.

== Traditional dress ==
The traditional dress of the Benteng people is a mixture of the Chinese traditional dress mostly of Hokkien heritage and the Betawi traditional dress. The males wear a black shirt and long pants with a traditional hat in conical shape. The female dress called 'hwa kun' is a blouse with headdress and veil. An alternative costume is the 'kebaya encim' of Peranakan heritage.

== Culture ==
Benteng culture today is a mixture of Betawi, Sundanese, and Chinese cultures. One example is cokek, a dance featuring a male and female couple set to gambang kromong music. Religiously, the Benteng Chinese adhere to Confucianism, Buddhism, Taoism, Catholicism, Protestantism, ancestor worship, and few adhere to Islam.

Although most Benteng people do not speak Chinese, they maintain a number of Chinese traditions, including the use of Qing wedding costumes.

== Notable people ==
Notable people with Benteng Chinese heritage or ties include:

- Tan Eng Goan, the first Majoor der Chinezen of Batavia (1802–1872): bureaucrat and landlord.
- Oey Giok Koen, Kapitein der Chinezen (died in 1912): bureaucrat, landlord and social activist.
- Oey Djie San, Kapitein der Chinezen (died in 1925): bureaucrat, landlord and social activist.
- Tan Liok Tiauw (1872–1947): colonial landlord, plantation owner and industrialist.
- Mona Lohanda: historian and academic.
- Udaya Halim (born in 1953): entrepreneur and heritage activist.

== See also ==
- Boen Tek Bio, the oldest Chinese temple in Tangerang.
- Benteng Heritage Museum, a local museum highlight Benteng Chinese heritage and culture.
- Benteng language, a Malay-based creole language spoken by the Benteng people.
