= Mona Lohanda =

Indonesian historian and archivist (1947–2021)

Mona Lohanda (4 November 1947 – 16 January 2021) was an Indonesian historian, archivist and academic, as well as a curator of the National Archives of Indonesia. She was a leading authority on the history of Batavia, as well as its Chinese-Indonesian community.

== Early life ==
On 4 November 1947, Lohanda was born in Tangerang, Indonesia. Lohanda comes from a Benteng Chinese family. Lohanda grew up in Tangerang, Indonesia.

== Education ==
In 1975, Lohanda graduated with a B.A. degree from the Faculty of Literature, University of Indonesia. Lohanda was encouraged by the Indonesian historian Harsja Bachtiar to focus on Chinese-Indonesian history. In 1994, Lohanda earned a M.A. from the School of Oriental and African Studies, University of London.

== Career ==
In 1972, Lohanda commenced work at the National Archives of Indonesia, where she later specialized on the Dutch East India Company (VOC) period of colonial Indonesia, especially the period between 1683 and 1806. She compiled an index of VOC documents to facilitate the work of researchers and other academics. She retired from the Indonesian National Archives in 2012. She was also a lecturer at her alma mater, the University of Indonesia.

For her contribution to Indonesian historiography, Lohanda received the Nabil Award in 2010, the Kompas Cedekiawan Berdedikasi Award in 2012, and the Bakrie Award in 2016.

== Death ==
On January 16, 2021, Lohanda died at Sari Asih Karawaci Hospital, Tangerang at the age of 73 due to a heart attack.

== Major works ==
- Sejarah sosial DKI Jakarta Raya (in Indonesian) [English: 'The Social History of Jakarta']. Jakarta: Departemen Pendidikan dan Kebudayaan, Direktorat Sejarah dan Nilai Tradisional, Proyek Inventarisasi dan Dokumentasi Sejarah Nasional, 1984.
- The Kapitan Cina of Batavia, 1837-1942: A History of Chinese Establishment in Colonial Society. Jakarta: Djambatan, 1996.
- Growing pains: the Chinese and the Dutch in colonial Java, 1890-1942. Jakarta: Yayasan Cipta Loka Caraka, 2002.
- Sejarah para pembesar mengatur Batavia (In Indonesian) [English: 'A History of the Officialdom in Charge of Batavia']. Jakarta: Masup Jakarta, 2007.
- Membaca sumber menulis sejarah (In Indonesian) [English: 'Reading Sources. Writing History']. Jakarta: Penerbit Ombak, 2011.
