= Betawi language =

Austronesian language native to Jakarta, Indonesia

Betawi
- Batavian, Jakartanese, Betawi Malay, Batavian Malay, Jakarta Malay
- Ba(ha)sè/Basa Betawi
- Native to: Indonesia
- Region: Greater Jakarta
- Ethnicity: Betawi; Arab Indonesians; Benteng Chinese; Mardijker
- Native speakers: (5 million cited 2000 census)
- Language family: Malay-based creole: Betawi
- Dialects: Bekasi; Cikarang; Depok; Parung; Serpong; Tangerang; Urban Jakarta
- Writing system: Latin (Malay alphabet)

Official status
- Regulated by: Badan Pengembangan dan Pembinaan Bahasa

Language codes
- ISO 639-3: bew
- Glottolog: beta1252
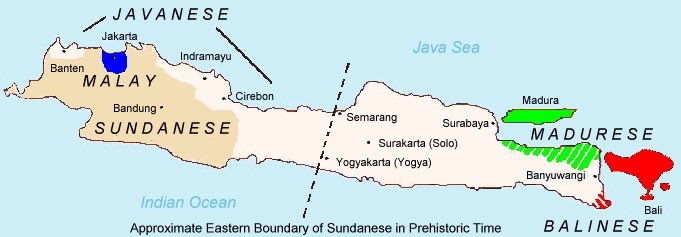
- Distribution map of languages spoken in Java, Madura, and Bali. Betawi language spoken in and around modern Jakarta (blue) is traditionally registered as Malay.

Betawi, also known as Batavian, Jakartanese, Betawi Malay, Batavian Malay, or Jakarta Malay, is the spoken language of the Betawi people in and around Jakarta, Indonesia. The name "Betawi" stems from Batavia, the official name of Jakarta during the era of the Dutch East Indies. A precise number of speakers is difficult to determine due to the vague use of the name.

Linguistically, the traditional dialects as spoken for in-group communication within the Betawi community differ quite significantly from Colloquial Jakarta Indonesian, the vernacular Indonesian variety used as a lingua franca among the diverse urbanites in Greater Jakarta and elsewhere in Indonesia. In modern-day Jakarta and the surrounding area, Betawi and Indonesian are often used in a continuum, with traditional varieties as the basilect and Standard Indonesian as the acrolect. Colloquial Jakarta Indonesian, which sits in the middle, incorporate significant influence not only from Betawi, but also from other languages brought by migrants to Jakarta. According to Uri Tadmor, there is no clear border distinguishing Colloquial Jakarta Indonesian from Betawi language.

While Colloquial Jakartan Indonesian has become the primary lingua franca in Jakarta and enjoys great popularity in Indonesian media, traditional Betawi varieties are seriously endangered, as they are now mostly only spoken by the older generation in some locations on the outskirts of Jakarta, such as Kampung Melayu, Pasar Rebo, Pondok Gede, Ulujami, and Jagakarsa.

There is a significant Chinese community which lives around Tangerang, called Cina Benteng, who have stopped speaking Chinese and now speak a Betawi variant with noticeable Chinese and Sundanese influence, including many Chinese (mostly Hokkien) loanwords. This language is the Benteng language which is still included in the Betawic language family.

== Background ==
The origin of Betawi is of debate to linguists; many consider it to be an "inherited" Malay vernacular directly descended from Proto-Malayic, while others consider it to have developed as a creole. It is believed that descendants of Chinese men and Balinese women in Batavia converted to Islam and spoke a pidgin that was later creolized, and then decreolized incorporating many elements from Sundanese and Javanese. Meanwhile, according to scholar John Hoffman, the development of Betawi from Malay was outcome of isolation of the settlement from Sundanese and Javanese speaking interior by formidable physical barrier (of swamp and forest) and administrative barrier. It replaced the earlier Portuguese creole of Batavia, Mardijker.

Aside from Sundanese, Javanese, and Balinese influences, Betawi has large amounts of Hokkien Chinese, Arabic, Portuguese, and Dutch loanwords. Especially the Indonesian Arabic variation which greatly influences the vocabulary in this language. The first-person pronoun gua ('I' or 'me') and second-person pronoun lu ('you') and numerals such as cepé' ('a hundred'), gopé' ('five hundred'), and secèng ('a thousand') are from Hokkien, whereas the words anè ('I' or 'me') and énté ('you') are derived from Arabic.

== Dialects ==
A dialogue using Betawi and Indonesian

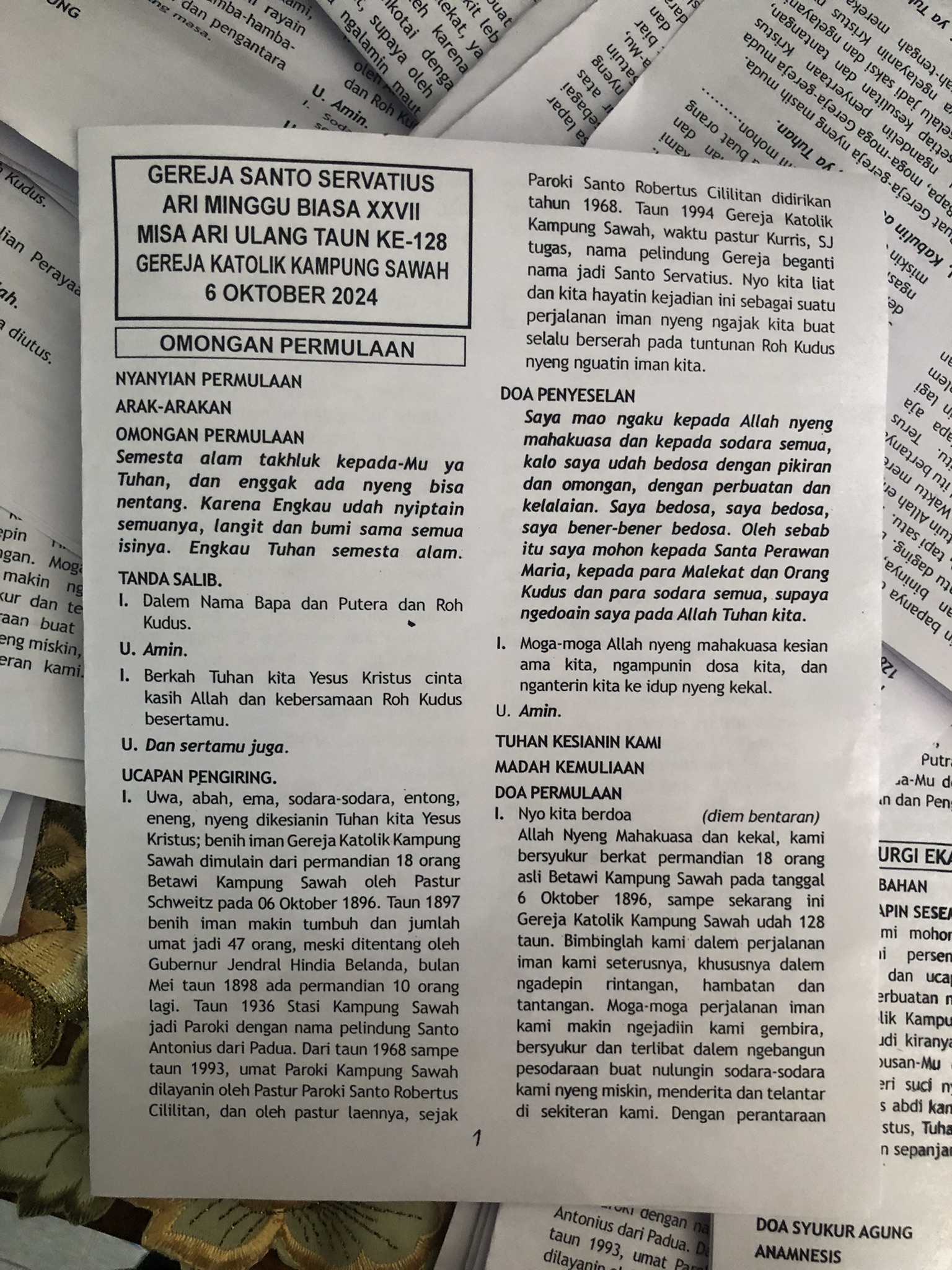
The order of Catholic Mass text in Suburban Betawi dialect at St. Servatius Church

The Betawi or Jakarta Malay language has retained Proto-Malayic instances of schwa (*ə) in final closed syllables (*-əC; e.g. malem 'night' instead of Standard Indonesian malam). Although this is a relic feature shared with Bangka Malay and Palembang Malay, older attestations on the George (or Georg) Meister's conversations from 1692 contain inconsistent forms (mallam), showing that Betawi developed from unstable lingue franche spoken in Batavia at that time.

There is no absolute consensus among linguists regarding the classification of the traditional varieties of Batavian language. The most popular classification divides Batavian into two varieties (dialects or subdialects), i.e.:

- Middle Batavian or Urban Batavian dialect (Betawi Tengah or Betawi Kota), originally spoken within the Urban Jakarta region, which is mainly characterized by an obvious realization of final [a] to [ɛ], e.g.: ada [ada] (Indonesian) 'to be (existence)' → adè [adɛ].
- Suburban Batavian or Ora Batavian dialect (Betawi Pinggiran or Betawi Ora), originally spoken in suburban Jakarta, Tangerang in Banten, Depok, Bogor, Bekasi, and Karawang in West Java, which is characterized by the retention of final [a] or a change into [ah], e.g. gua [gua] or guah [guah] 'I, me' instead of guè [guɛ], and the use of ora 'no, not' as a negation particle instead of kaga' which is used in the Middle dialect.

Chaer (1982) divided the language into four subdialects, which are based mainly on—but not limited to—phonological realization variations, i.e.:

- Meester subdialect, spread across Jatinegara, Kampung Melayu, and the surrounding areas.
- Tanah Abang subdialect, spread across Tanah Abang, Petamburan, and surrounding areas.
- Karet subdialect, spread across Karet, Senayan, Kuningan, Menteng, and surrounding areas.
- Kebayoran subdialect, spread across suburban and rural areas of the Batavian-speaking region.

The table below briefly describes the final sound realization variations between the subdialects drawn by Chaer (1982):

Indonesian		Batavian language							
Indonesian		Meester		Tanah Abang		Karet		Kebayoran	
[ah]	rumah [rumah] 'house'	[ɛ]	rumè [rumɛ]	[ɤː]	rume [rumɤː]	[a]	ruma [ruma]	[ah]	rumah [rumah]
[a]	bawa [bawa] 'to bring'	[ɛ]	bawè [bawɛ]	[ɤː]	bawe [bawɤː]	[ɛʔ]	bawè' [bawɛʔ]	[aʔ]	bawa' [bawaʔ]
[a]	saya [saja] 'I, me'	[ɛ]	sayè [sajɛ]	[ɤː]	saye [sajɤː]	[ɛ]	sayè [sajɛ]	[ah]	sayah [sajah]
[ai̯]	satai [satai̯] 'satay'	[e]	saté [sate]	[e]	saté [sate]	[eʔ]	saté' [sateʔ]	[ɛʔ]	satè' [satɛʔ]
[ai̯]	ramai [ramai̯] 'crowded'	[ɛ]	ramè [ramɛ]	[ɛ]	ramè [ramɛ]	[ɛ]	ramè [ramɛ]	[ɛ]	ramè [ramɛ]
[ɛh]	boleh [bolɛh] 'may, might'	[ɛ]	bolè [bɔlɛ]	[e]	bolé [bɔle] or [bole]	[e]	bolé [bɔle] or [bole]	[eh] or [ɛh]	boléh [bɔleh] or bolèh [bɔlɛh]
[oh]	bodoh [bodoh] 'fool'	[ɔ] or [o]	bodo [bɔdɔ] or [bodo]	[ɔ] or [o]	bodo [bɔdɔ] or [bodo]	[ɔ] or [o]	bodo [bɔdɔ] or [bodo]	[ɔʔ]	bodo' [bɔdɔʔ]
[uh]	bunuh [bunuh] 'to kill'	[u]	bunu [bunu]	[u]	bunu [bunu]	[u]	bunu [bunu]	[uh]	bunuh [bunuh]
[u]	minggu [miŋɡu] 'week'	[u]	minggu [miŋɡu]	[u]	minggu [miŋɡu]	[uʔ]	minggu' [miŋɡuʔ]	[uʔ]	minggu' [miŋɡuʔ]

However, Chaer (2015) also made a classification of dialectal variations based on the typology of Batavian subgroups, which is divided into three dialectal variations, i.e.:

- Urban variation (Betawi Kota or Betawi Tengah)
- Suburban variation
- Rural variation (Betawi Ora')

Apart from a geographical basis, this typology is also based on final phoneme realization variations. This table describes the differences between these variations as cited in Chaer (2015).

Indonesian		Batavian language					
Indonesian		Urban		Suburban		Rural	
[a]	apa [apa] 'what'	[ɛ]	apè [apɛ]	[ɛ]	apè [apɛ]	[ah]	apah [apah]
[ah]	salah [salah] 'mistaken'	[ɛ]	salè [salɛ]	[a]	sala [sala]	[ah]	salah [salah]

A Batavian native speaker of Tanah Abang reading a Batavian syair (poem) in Tanah Abang dialect. One of the most notable features of the dialect is the realisation of final [a] or [ah] as [ə]~[ɤː].

Meanwhile, Grijns (1991) drew the classification into 7 distinct dialects. These dialectal differences are drawn not only based on phonological realization variations—unlike other classifications that are mainly focused only on these phonological realization variations of final sounds—but also based on morphological and lexical differences (including lexical compatibility with other languages, such as Balinese, Javanese, Malay, and Sundanese). This is the classification of the dialects:

- Urban Jakarta Malay dialect, spoken mainly within the urban area of Jakarta. The most conspicuous feature of this dialect is the occurrence of è [ɛ] as the realization of the final diaphoneme a [a], e.g.: berapa [bərapa] 'how many, how much' → berapè [bərapɛ]. From a lexical compatibility aspect, this language has a high lexical compatibility with Malay and Indonesian. Javanese and Sundanese influences are roughly almost equal, while Balinese influence is not dominant.
- Cengkareng–Grogol Petamburan–Kebayoran Baru dialects, spoken in several parts of West Jakarta and Senayan, South Jakarta.
- Pasar Rebo dialect, spoken in several parts of East Jakarta, especially in Pasar Rebo, Pulo Gadung, and surrounding areas.
- Ciputat dialect, spoken across the western part of the Batavian-speaking region, comprising Ciputat in South Tangerang, Depok, and several parts of northern Bogor.
- Gunungsindur dialect, spoken in the southwestern part of the Batavian-speaking region, especially in the Gunungsindur region.
- Pebayuran dialect, spoken in the eastern part of the Batavian-speaking region, mainly in the Bekasi region.
- Mauk–Sepatan dialect, spoken in the northeastern part of the Batavian-speaking region, precisely in Mauk and Sepatan, which are located on the northern coast of Tangerang Regency.

However, Von de Wall (1909) also noted a dialect of the Batavian language, which has the visible feature of the final a [a] realization as ĕ [ə]. The usage of this "older" dialect started to fade later and to be replaced gradually with è [ɛ]. In 1971, Grijns (1991) could still witness a consistent realization of ĕ [ə] in Kebon Pala. Here is an example of this dialect usage:

Batavian of the ĕ [ə] dialect	English translation
Njò^{ء}lĕ, naèk, kitĕ pĕlĕsiran. Poelang-poelang... malĕm; pedoeli apĕ, tĕrèm bĕdjalan hampé tĕngĕ malĕm boetĕ. Goewĕ rasĕ hampé poekoel hatoe. (Note: Von Dewall used ĕ to represent [ə]. Besides, his spelling is mainly based on Dutch orthography that uses oe for [u].)	Come on! Get in! Let's have fun. It will be late at night once we get home. Who cares? The tram operates until midnight. I think it's until 1 o'clock.

Even though the Urban Jakarta dialect with its final è [ɛ] realization stereotypes the Batavian language throughout Indonesia, there is no concept of a certain regional dialect being considered as 'higher' or 'more prestigious' than the other dialects among Batavians. However, dialect-mixing is also found in some cases, especially on social media posts.

According to Glottolog 5.2, the dialects are divided into Bekasi, Cikarang, Depok, Parung, Serpong, and Tangerang. There is a distinction between the Bekasi and Cikarang dialects, even though they are administratively in the same area, for example Bekasi dialect is used in the western part, including Babelan, Muaragembong, and surrounding areas, while the Cikarang dialect is used in Cikarang and surrounding areas, directly bordering the Bekasi Sundanese speaking area. Likewise, the Serpong and Tangerang dialects are also distinguished, with the Serpong dialect spoken in South Tangerang, namely Serpong and its surroundings, especially Setu and Pondok Aren, while the Tangerang dialect refers to the dialect used in the city of Tangerang and coastal areas such as Teluknaga, Mauk, and surrounding areas. Both dialects are influenced by Tangerang Sundanese.

== Sample ==
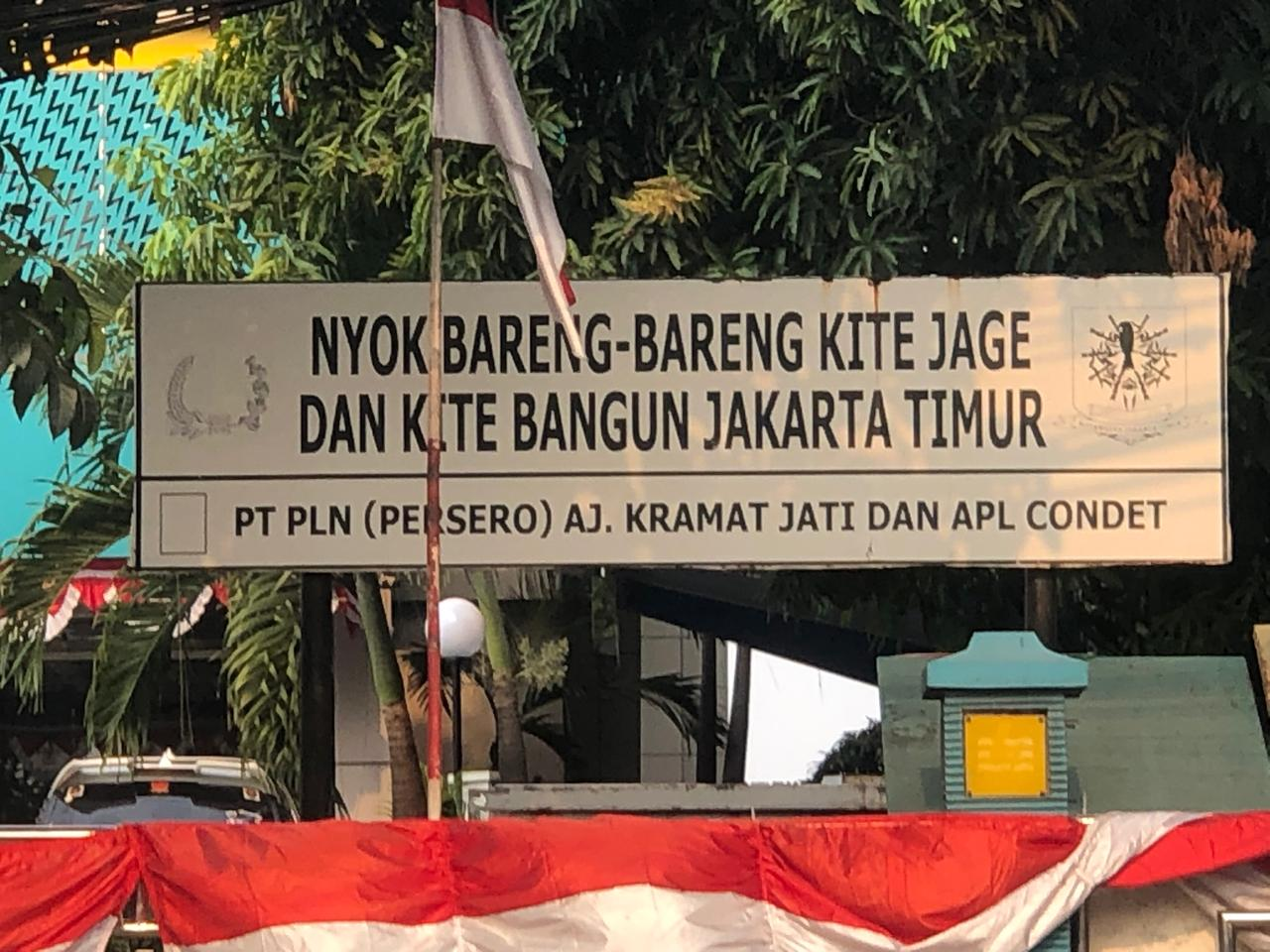
Attention board in Middle Betawi dialect

A sample of a man speaking in Middle Betawi dialect

=== Central Betawi ===
Semuè orang, mah, èmang diberocotin ènggal amè ngelè argè diri amè hak-hak nyang sembabad. Tu orang padè diangsrongin deri sononya pikiran amè liangsim mengkènyè udè kudunyè, dèh, padè segalang-segulung nyampur amè nyang laènnyè dengen sumanget sudaraan.

=== Suburban Betawi ===
Semua orang dari sonohnya, mah, èmang diberocotinnya pada bébas ama gableg arga diri ama hak nyang sembabad. Tu orang udah dikasi pikiran ama liangsim mangkanya udah kudunya, dah, tuh, pada gaul campur dengen semanget sedaraan.

=== Indonesian ===
Semua manusia dilahirkan bebas dan samarata dari segi kemuliaan dan hak-hak. Mereka mempunyai pemikiran dan perasaan hati dan hendaklah bertindak di antara satu sama lain dengan semangat persaudaraan.

=== English ===
All human beings are born free and equal in dignity and rights. They are endowed with reason and conscience and should act towards one another in a spirit of brotherhood.

== See also ==
- Benteng language
- Cocos Malay
- Indonesian slang
