= Benteng Heritage Museum =

Museum in Banten, Indonesia

Coordinates: 6°10′43″S 106°37′47″E

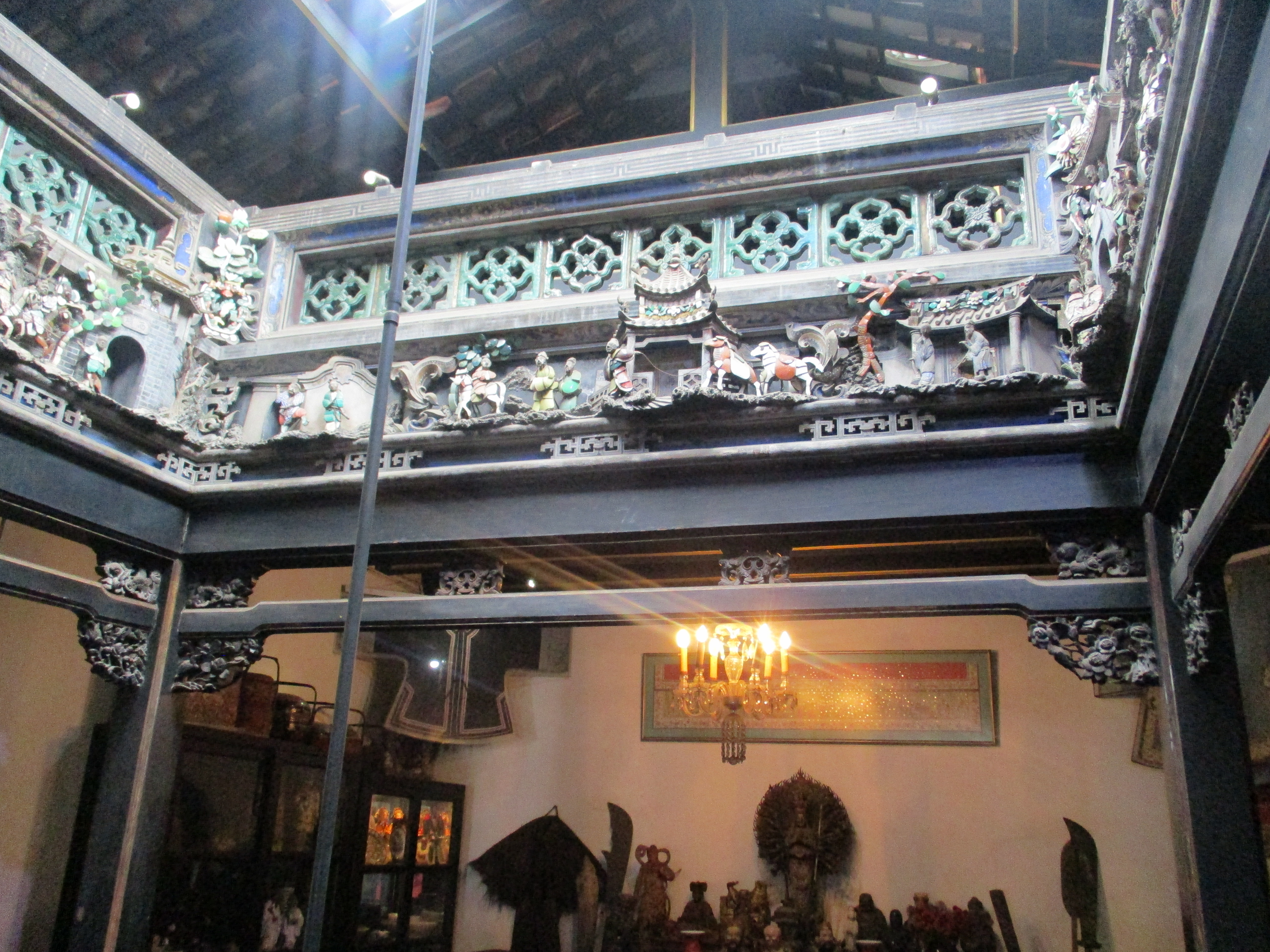
Benteng Heritage Museum's interior

The Benteng Heritage Museum (Indonesian: Museum Benteng Heritage) is a heritage site and museum in Pasar Lama, the old market district in Tangerang, Banten, Indonesia. Located near the river Cisadane, it is the first Indonesian museum that highlights the history and heritage of ethnic Chinese in Indonesia.

Benteng Heritage Museum is housed in a traditional, vernacular Peranakan Chinese building. Built in 1684, it is one of the oldest historic structures in Tangerang, and is within walking distance of the city's oldest temple, Boen Tek Bio.

== Heritage conservation ==
Prior to its conversion into a museum, the original building was very poorly maintained, and was occupied by local Benteng Chinese. Believing that the building had significant historic and cultural value, a local entrepreneur, Udaya Halim, acquired the heritage property in 2009. Halim grew up in Tangerang's historic Pasar Lama area, but moved with his family to Perth, Western Australia during the Asian economic crisis.

He oversaw a careful restoration of the building, returning it to its original state. The process took two years. Additional Peranakan Chinese decorative elements, including a partition screen, were added to enhance the Chinese-Indonesian character of the new museum. All the additional decoration was based on a thorough academic study of other structures from a similar period since no data existed regarding the museum's original appearance.

== See also ==
- Boen Tek Bio
- Benteng Chinese
- Chinese Indonesians
