= Tangerang, Tangerang =

Tangerang (Kecamatan Tangerang)
- District
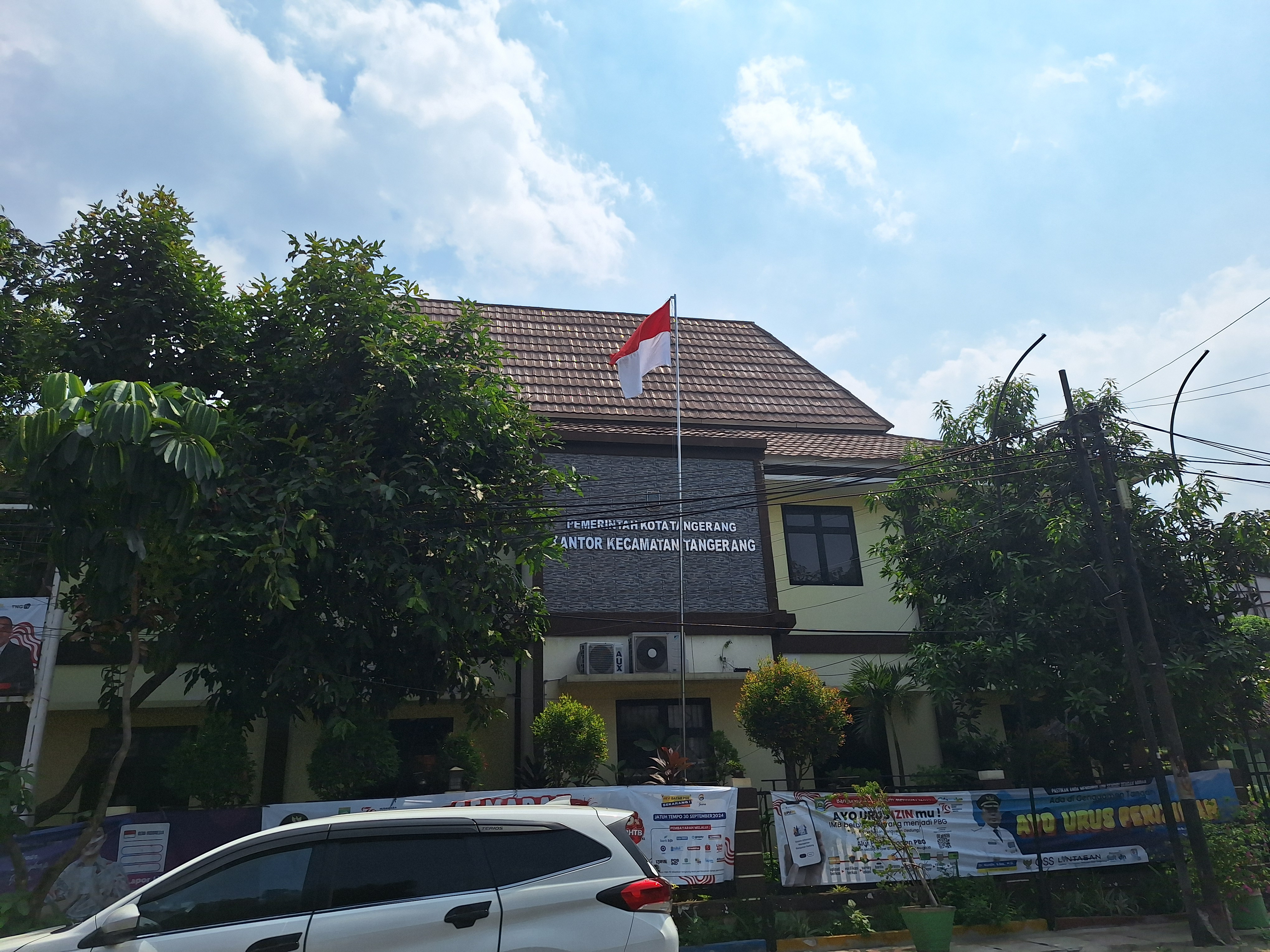
- Regent office (2024)
- Interactive map of Tangerang
- Country: Indonesia
- Province: Banten
- Municipality: Tangerang City

Area
  - Total: 15.79 km^{2} (6.10 sq mi)

Population (mid 2023 estimate)
  - Total: 165,575
  - Density: 10,490/km^{2} (27,160/sq mi)

Tangerang District is an administrative district of Tangerang City, in Banten Province of Indonesia, on the island of Java. It covers an area of 15.79 km^{2}, and had a population of 126,244 at the 2010 Census and 153,859 at the 2020 Census; the official estimate as at mid 2023 was 165,575.

== Communities ==
Tangerang District is sub-divided into eight urban communities (kelurahan), listed below with their areas and their officially-estimated populations as at mid 2022, together with their postcodes.

Kode Wilayah	Name of kelurahan	Area in km^{2}	Population mid 2022 estimate	Post code
36.71.01.1001	Sukarasa	0.96	7,270	15111
36.71.01.1002	Sukaasih	0.48	6,143	15111
36.71.01.1003	Tanah Tinggi	1.80	36,352	15119
36.71.01.1004	Buaran Indah	1.60	26,569	15119
36.71.01.1005	Cikokol	4.17	31,569	15117
36.71.01.1006	Kelapa Indah	1.80	11,881	15117
36.71.01.1007	Sukasari	1.87	24,913	15118
36.71.01.1008	Babakan	1.85	19,496	15118
36.71.01	Totals	14.53	164,193 ^{(a)}	

Notes: (a) comprising 82,184 males and 82,009 females.
