= Neglasari =

- Town and district
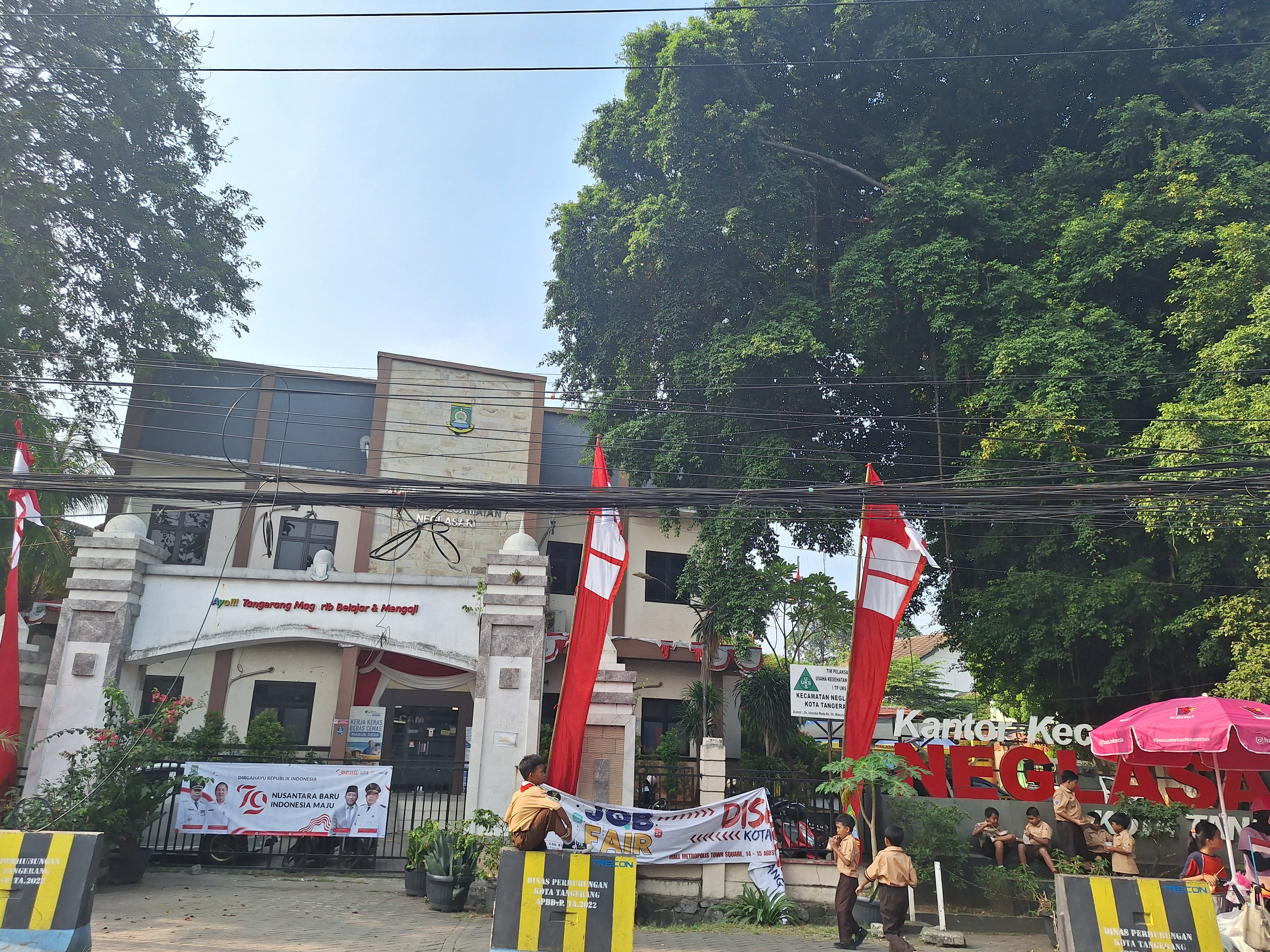
- Regent's office (2024)
- Interactive map of Neglasari
- Country: Indonesia
- Province: Banten
- Municipality: Tangerang City

Area
  - Total: 16.08 km^{2} (6.21 sq mi)

Population (mid 2023 estimate)
  - Total: 124,907
  - Density: 7,768/km^{2} (20,120/sq mi)

Neglasari is a town and an administrative district (kecamatan) of Tangerang City, in Banten Province of Indonesia, on the island of Java. The district covers an area of 16.08 km^{2}, and had a population of 103,504 at the 2010 Census and 115,520 at the 2020 Census; the official estimate as at mid 2023 was 124,907.

== Communities ==
Neglasari District is sub-divided into seven urban communities (kelurahan), listed below with their areas and their officially-estimated populations as at mid 2022, together with their postcodes.

Kode Wilayah	Name of kelurahan	Area in km^{2}	Population mid 2022 estimate	Post code
36.71.10.1001	Neglasari (town)	1.82	19,759	15129
36.71.10.1002	Karang Sari	1.90	27,127	15121
36.71.10.1003	Selapajang Jaya	2.57	18,344	15127
36.71.10.1004	Kedaung Wetan	2.08	19,493	15128
36.71.10.1005	Mekarsari	1.54	13,147	15129
36.71.10.1006	Karang Anyar	3.29	15,151	15121
36.71.10.1007	Kedaung Baru	2.87	10,246	15128
36.71.10	Totals	16.07	123,267 ^{(a)}	

Notes: (a) comprising 62,742 males and 60,525 females.
