= Teluknaga =

- District and Special Economic Zone
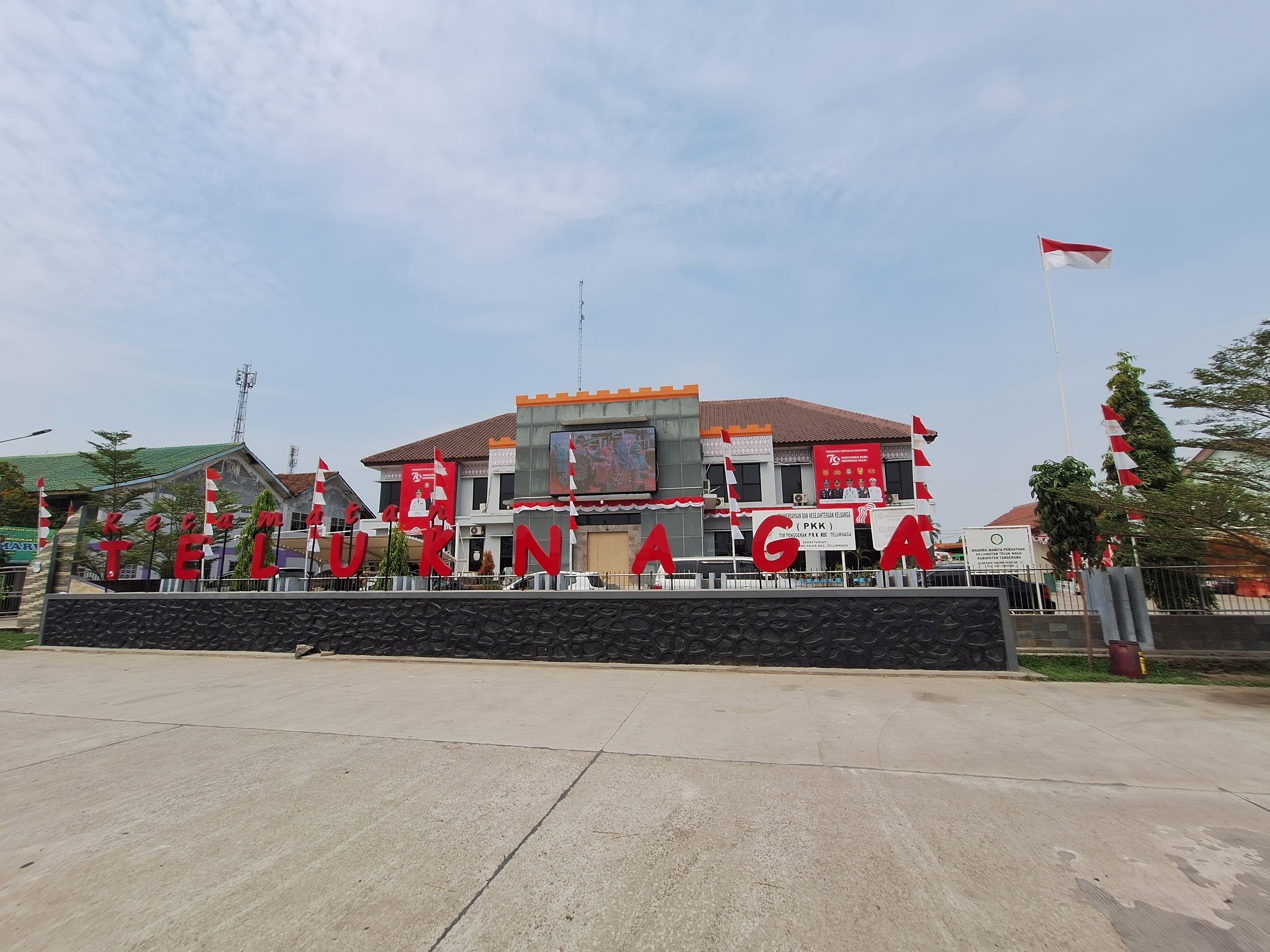
- Regent's office
- Interactive map of Teluknaga
- Coordinates: 6°5′56″S 106°38′17″E
- Country: Indonesia
- Island: Java
- Province: Banten
- Regency: Tangerang Regency

Area
  - Total: 20.24 sq mi (52.41 km^{2})

Population (mid 2024 estimate)
  - Total: 175,155
  - Density: 8,656/sq mi (3,342/km^{2})
- Time zone: UTC+7

Teluknaga ("Dragon Bay") is a district (kecamatan) located in the northeast of the Tangerang Regency of Banten Province on Java, Indonesia. It has a land area of 52.41 km^{2} and had a population of 138,330 at the 2010 Census and 160,946 at the 2020 Census; the official estimate as at mid 2024 was 175,155 (comprising 89,408 males and 85,747 females). The administrative centre is in the village of Kampung Melayu Timur. The district is composed of thirteen villages (desa), all sharing the postcode of 15510, as tabulated below.

== Administrative divisions ==
Kode Wilayah	Name of Desa	Area in sq. km	Pop'n mid 2024 Estimate
36.03.13.2002	Bojong Renged	2.05	17,632
36.03.13.2004	Keboncau	2.44	18,499
36.03.13.2001	Teluknaga	3.16	16,406
36.03.13.2003	Babakanasem	2.15	14,007
36.03.13.2006	Kampung Melayu Timur	2.00	18,761
36.03.13.2007	Kampung Melayu Barat	1.26	12,518
36.03.13.2013	Kampung Besar	4.67	14,816
36.03.13.2009	Lemo	5.49	8,285
36.03.13.2011	Tegal Angus	3.61	11,379
36.03.13.2005	Pangkalan	4.95	19,239
36.03.13.2012	Tanjung Burung	8.87	9,006
36.03.13.2010	Tanjung Pasir	7.27	10,027
36.03.13.2008	Muara	4.48	4,580
36.03.13	Totals	52.41	175,155

== Demographics ==
Its population was 138,330 as of the 2010 Census. The majority of the population is Muslims, there is also a sizable minority of Christians and Buddhists.

The majority of the population are Betawi people because of their historical proximity to Jakarta, the initial center of the formation of this ethnic group. A large minority in the district are Benteng Chinese whose ancestors were first recorded as arriving in 1407. The indigenous Banten Sundanese is mainly found in the three southernmost villages near Soekarno–Hatta International Airport, namely Babakanasem, Bojong Renged, and Keboncau.

== Geography ==
Kampung Besar ("Great Village") is in this district. The village's main street is Jalan KH Mushonif.

== History ==
The desa of Tanjung Burung in Teluknaga formed part of the particuliere landerij, or private domain, of Tandjoeng Boeroeng. It belonged to Tan Eng Goan, 1st Majoor der Chinezen of Batavia.

Masjid Al Makmur is the village's oldest mosque

== Transport ==
Several taxi companies operate in the district and city.

Teluknaga is adjacent to Soekarno–Hatta International Airport
