= Tangerang =

Largest city in Banten, Indonesia

- City
- City of Tangerang; Kota Tangerang

Other transcription(s)
  - Betawi: Tangerang Kotè
  - Sundanese: ᮓᮚᮩᮂ ᮒᮍᮨᮛᮀ
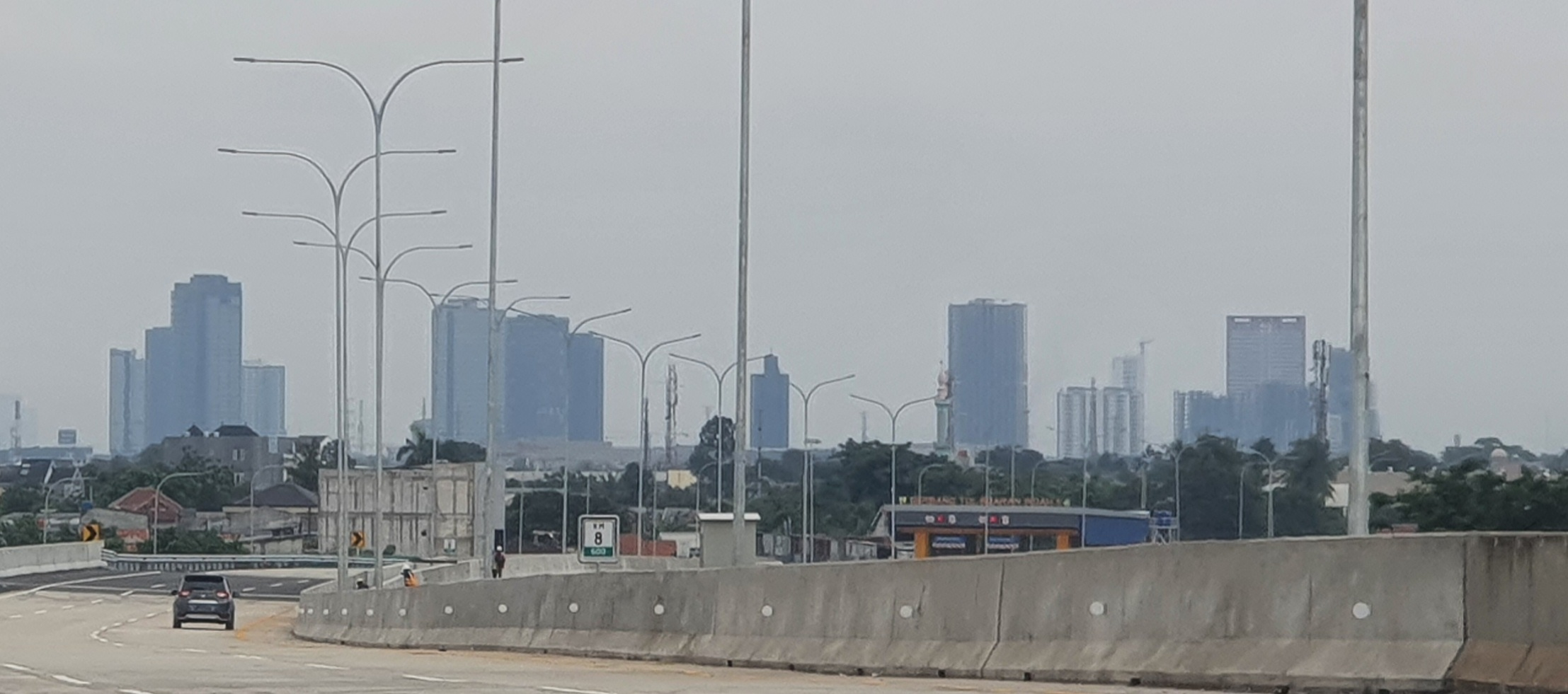
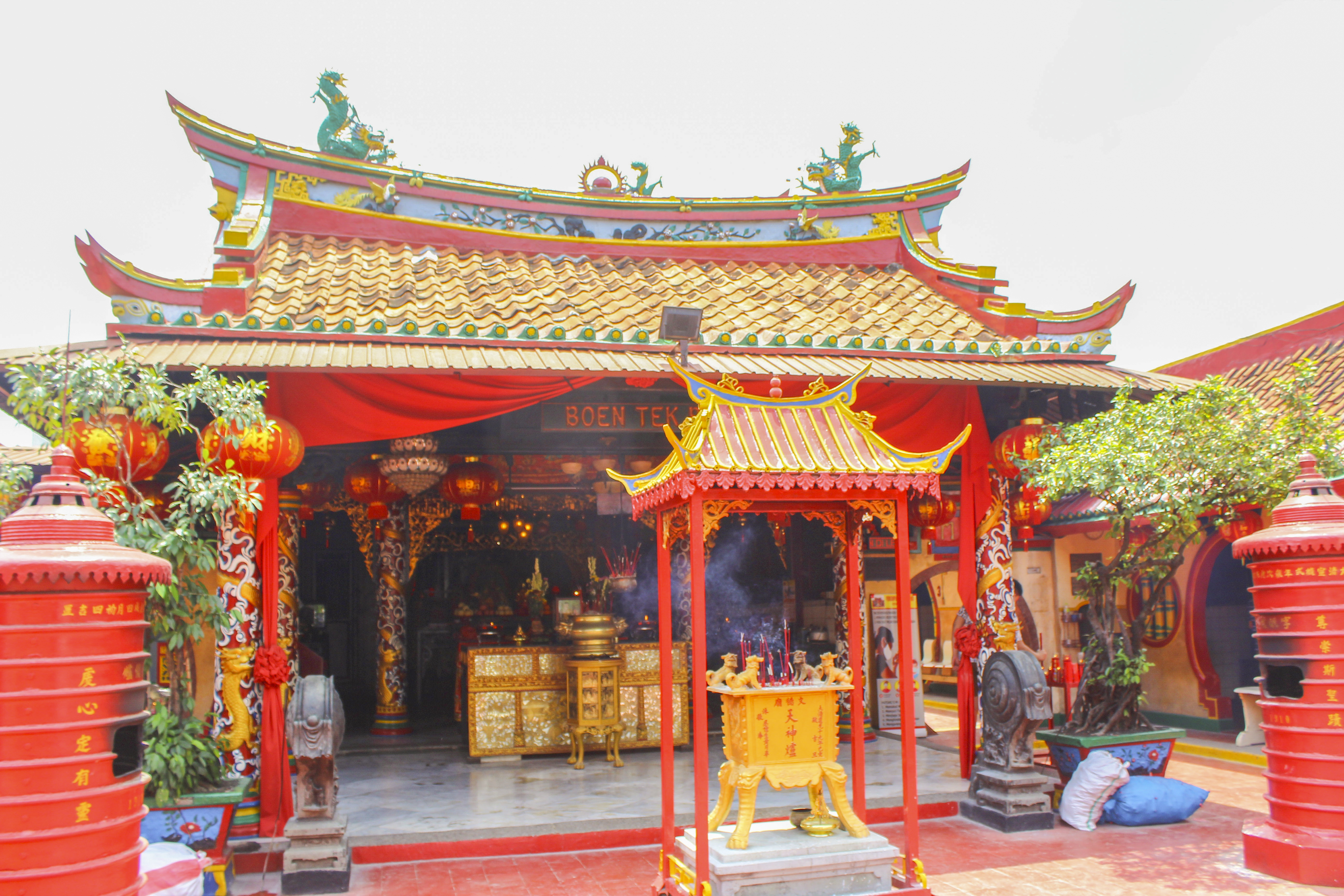
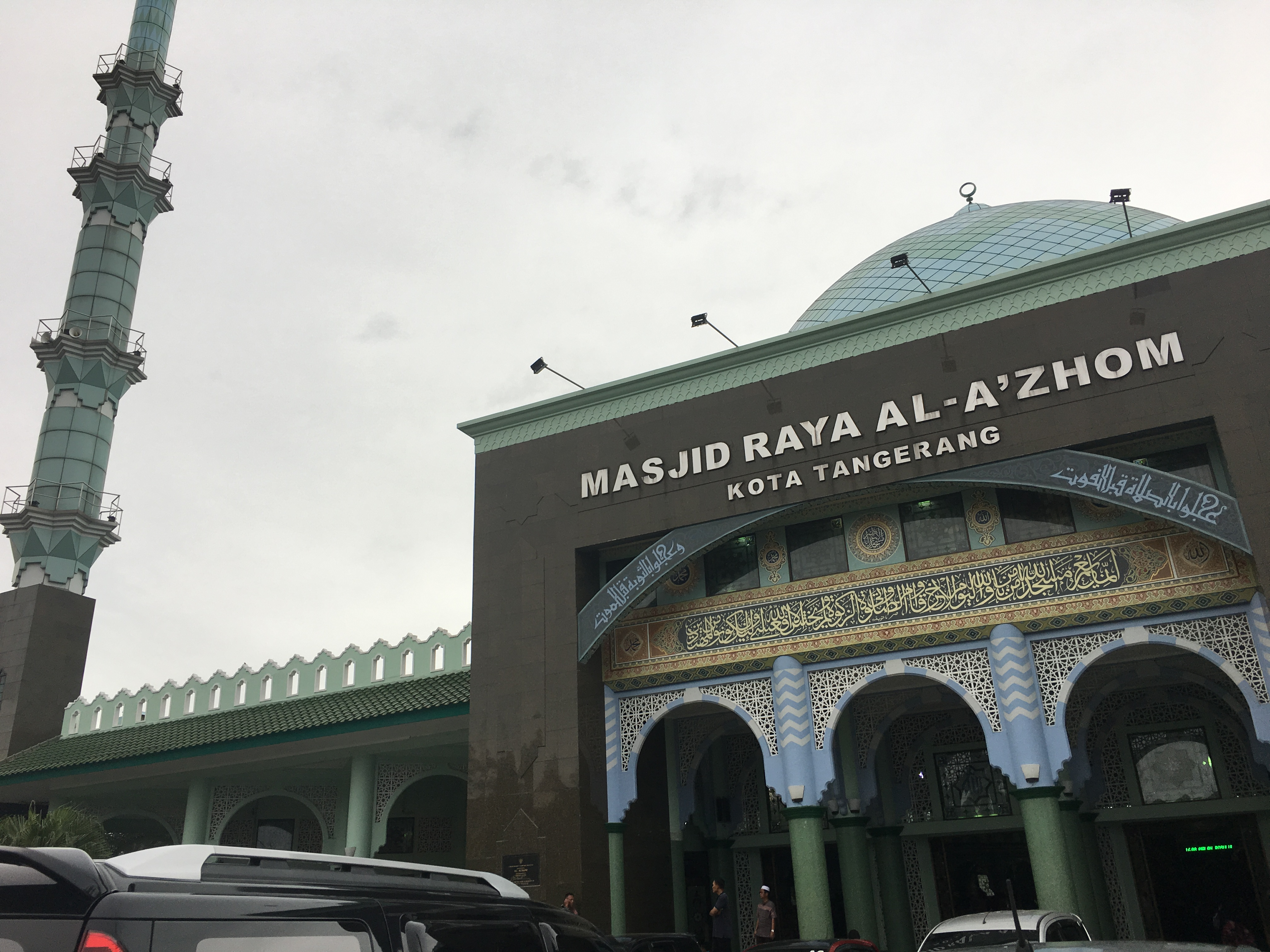
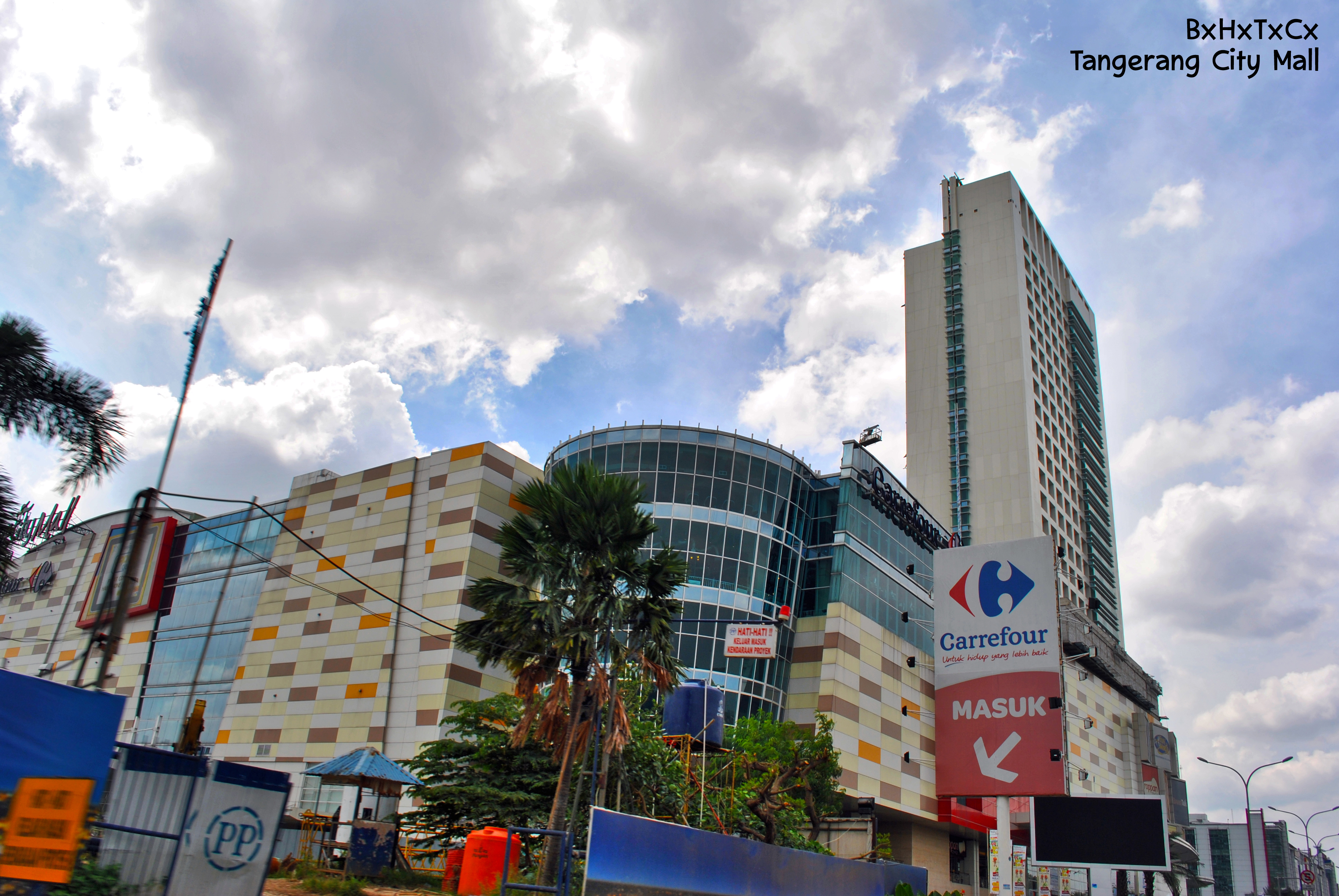
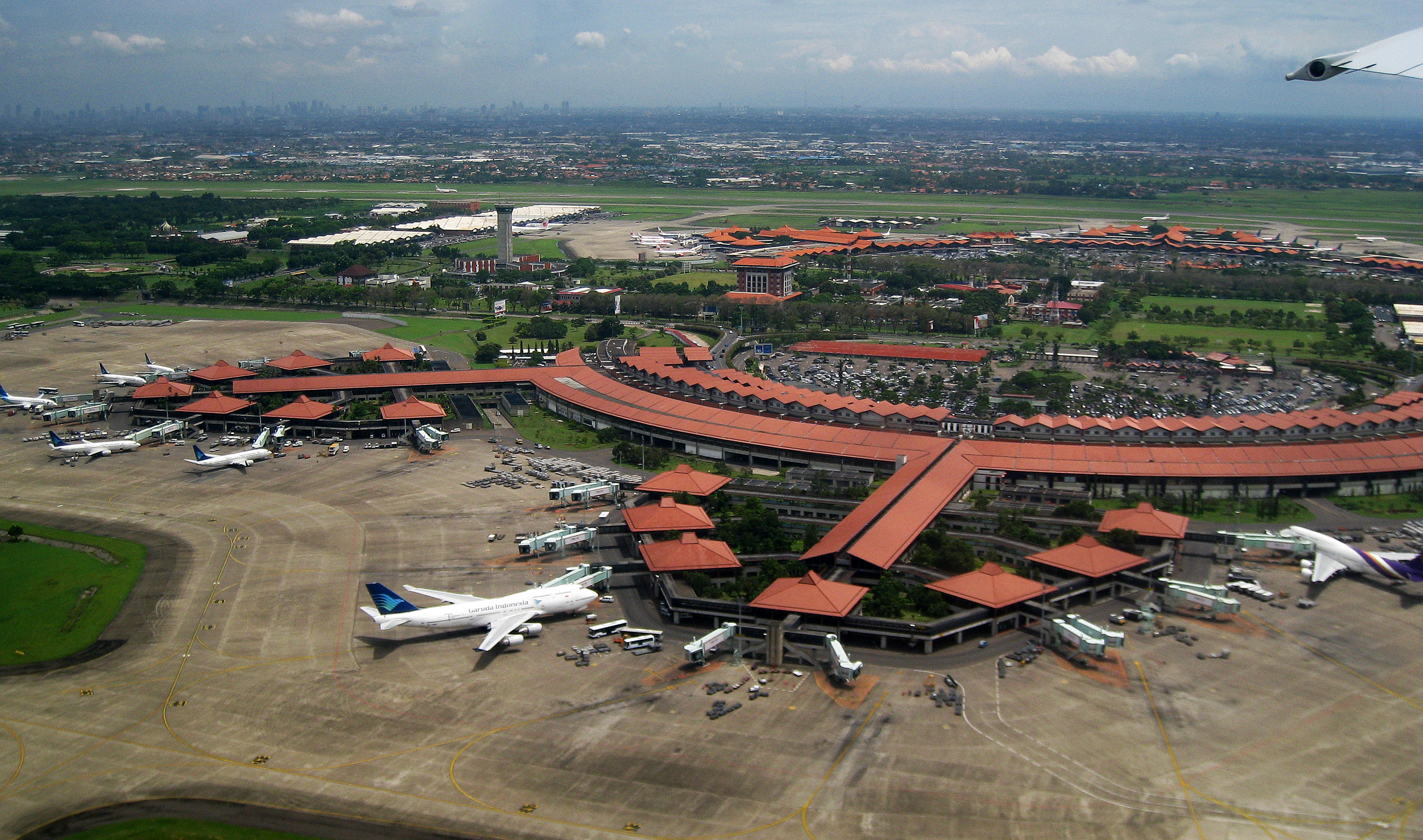
- Alam Sutera CBD Skyline Boen Tek Bio temple in Pasar Lama Al-Azhom Grand Mosque Tangerang City Mall Soekarno–Hatta International Airport

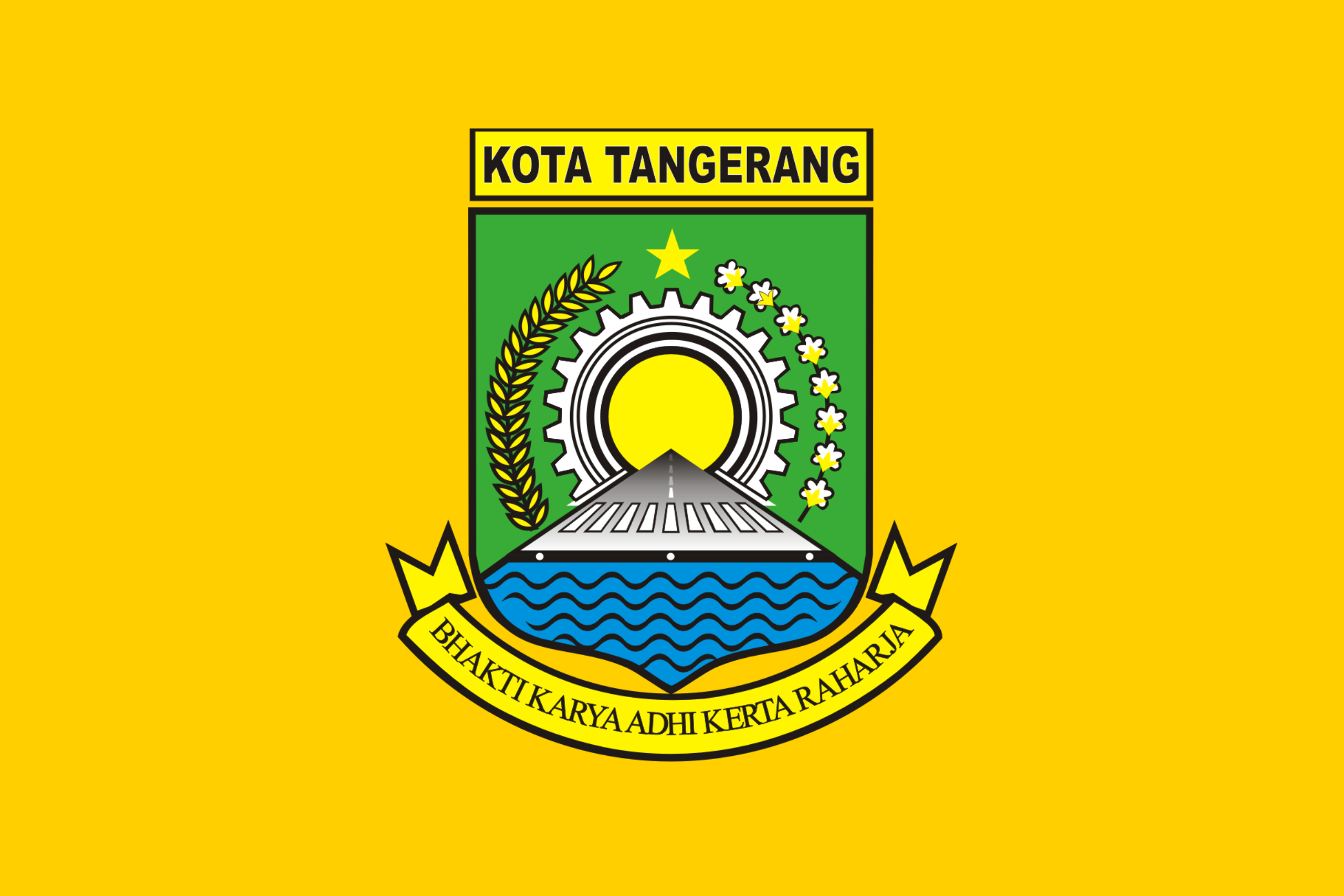
- Flag Coat of arms
- Nickname: Kota Benteng (Fortress City)
- Motto: Bhakti Karya Adhi Kerta Rahardja (Spirit of devotion in the form of the work for prosperity)
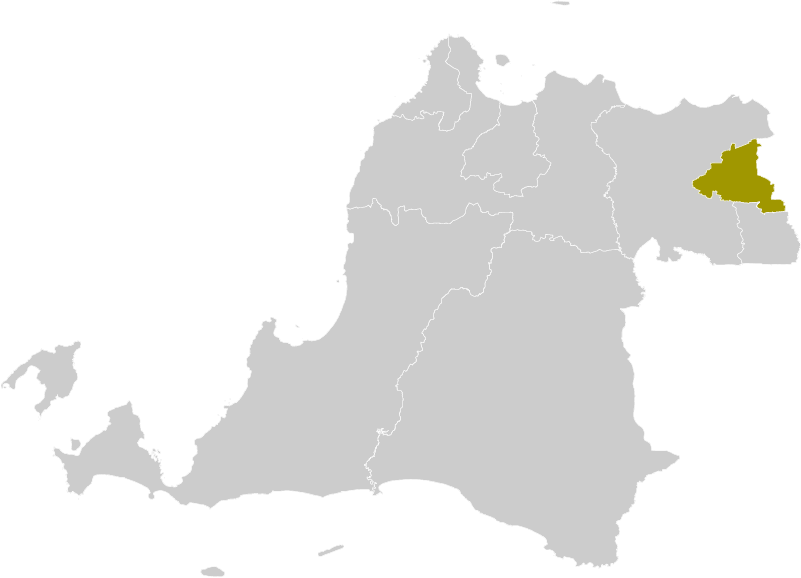
- Location within Banten

- Location in Java and Indonesia Tangerang (Indonesia)
- Coordinates: 06°10′13″S 106°38′25″E
- Country: Indonesia
- Province: Banten
- Metropolitan area: Jabodetabek
- Formation: 28 February 1993

Government
  - Body: Tangerang City government
  - Mayor: Sachrudin (Golkar)
  - Vice Mayor: Maryono Hasan
  - Legislature: Tangerang City Regional House of Representatives (DRPD)

Area
  - Total: 164.55 km^{2} (63.53 sq mi)

Population (mid 2024 estimate)
  - Total: 1,927,815
  - Rank: 7th
  - Density: 11,716/km^{2} (30,343/sq mi)
- Time zone: UTC+7 (Indonesia Western Time)
- Postcodes: 15xxx and 19xxx
- Area code: (+62) 21
- Vehicle registration: B xxxx Cxx/Vxx
- Website: tangerangkota.go.id

Tangerang (Indonesian pronunciation: [ˈt̪aŋəɾaŋ]) is the city with the largest population in the province of Banten, Indonesia. Located on the western border of Jakarta and bordered with South Tangerang city, Tangerang is the sixth largest city proper in the nation (excluding Jakarta, which is classed as a province containing five administrative cities and one regency). Tangerang is home to Soekarno–Hatta International Airport, the primary airport serving the Jakarta metropolitan area.

The city is an industrial and manufacturing hub for the island of Java and is home to over 1,000 factories. It has an area of 164.55 km^{2} (63.53 sq mi) and an official 2010 Census population of 1,798,601, which had risen to 1,895,486 at the 2020 Census, making it the eighth most populated suburb in the world at the latter date. In 2024, the population was estimated to be 1,927,815, consisting of 968,776 men and 959,039 women.

As one of the cities around Jakarta, Tangerang partly functions as a dormitory city with numerous residents commuting to Jakarta for work. Many high-class and middle-class satellite cities have been developed in Tangerang, complete with their own shopping malls, private schools and convenience centers. The government is working on expanding the toll road system to accommodate more traffic flow to and from the area. However, the city also contains many industrial areas, such as Jatake, and business districts, such as Alam Sutera, in its own right.

Since the 2000s, property developers and investors have favored Tangerang to create new economic and commercial centers. Recent and ongoing developments within and around Tangerang City include BSD City, Gading Serpong, Alam Sutera, Modernland, and Lippo Village. Some of those areas are the locations of prominent private universities, such as Bina Nusantara and Bunda Mulia campuses in Alam Sutera area. The Indonesia campus of Monash University is located in BSD area. The British School Jakarta (in South Tangerang City) is located not far from the border of Tangerang City. Moreover, the first IKEA in Indonesia is also operating in Tangerang.

== History ==
=== Origins ===
According to F. de Haan's writings taken from the VOC archives, reports that the Banten Sultanate had created a large country located west of the Untung Jawa River, and to fill the new land the Sultan of Banten had displaced 5,000 to 6,000 inhabitants.

In the Dag Register dated December 20, 1668, it was reported that the Sultan of Banten had appointed Raden Sena Pati and Kyai Demang as rulers. On suspicion of seizing the kingdom, Raden Sena Pati and Kyai Demang were sacked by the Sultan.

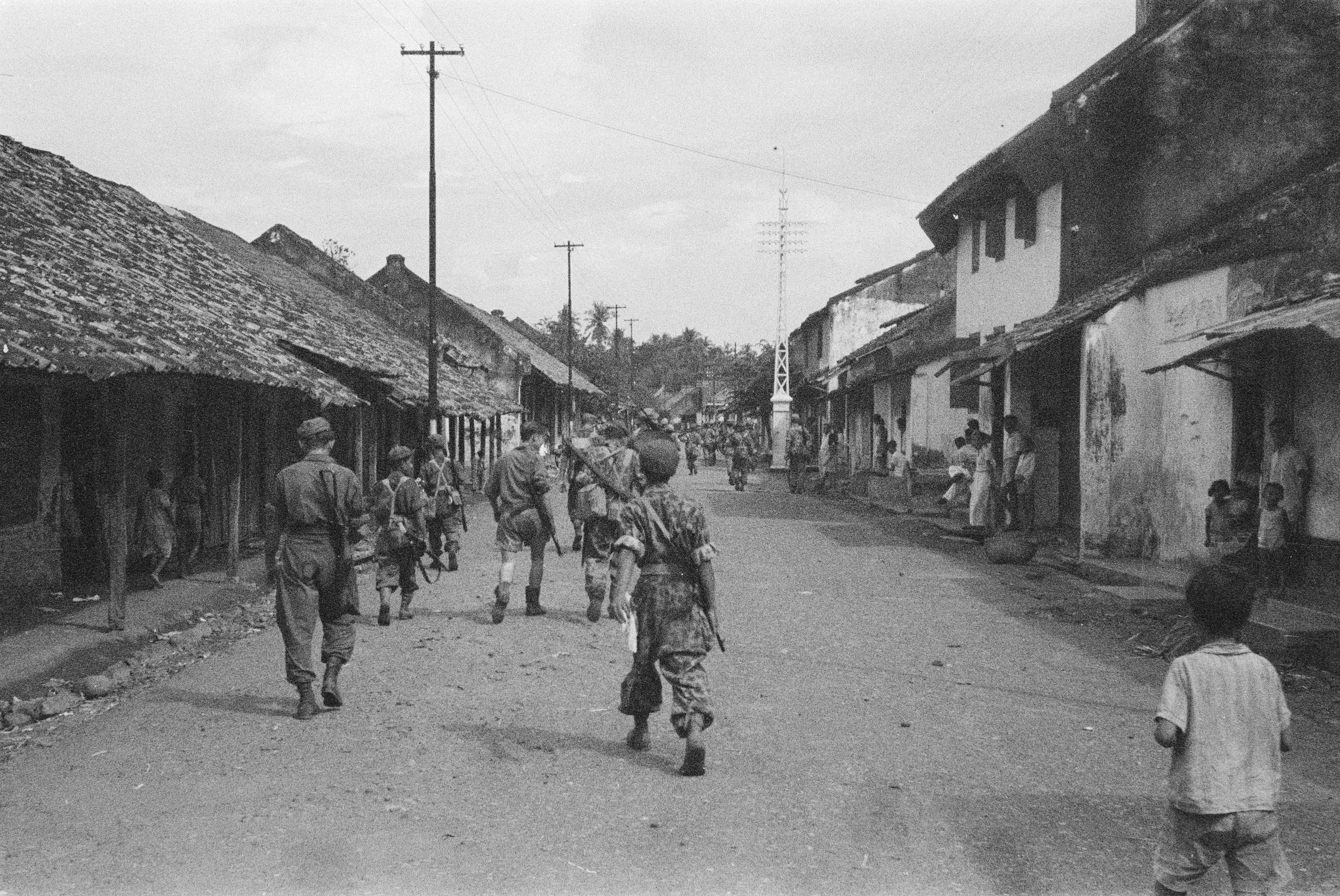
Dutch East Indies army in Tangerang, circa 1946

Prince Dipati was appointed to the region. For the dismissal, Ki Demang pitted Banten against the VOC. But he was killed in Kademangan.

The next VOC archive, the Dag Register dated March 4, 1680, explains that the ruler of Tangerang at that time was Kyai Dipati Soera Dielaga. Kyai Soeradilaga and his son Subraja asked for the protection of the VOC, followed by 143 retinues and soldiers. He and his retinue were given a place on the east side of the river, bordering the VOC. During the fighting with Banten, Soeradilaga and his war experts succeeded in repelling Bantenese troops. For his services, he was given the honorary title of Raden Aria Suryamanggala, while Prince Subraja was given the title of Kyai Dipati Soetadilaga.

Subsequently, Raden Aria Soetadilaga was appointed Regent of Tangerang I with an area covering the Angke River and Cisadane River. The title he used was Aria Soetidilaga I. Then, with an agreement signed on April 17, 1684, Tangerang became part of the territory of the VOC; Banten did not have the right to intervene in regulating governance in Tangerang. One of the articles of the agreement reads: "And it must be known with certainty the extent to which the boundaries of the territory that have been understood since the past will still be determined, namely the area bounded by Tangerang from the Java Sea coast to the mountains to the South Sea. That all land along Tangerang will belong to or be occupied by the VOC".

With the agreement, the regent's territory expanded to the west of the Tangerang river. To monitor Tangerang, it was deemed necessary to add more guard posts along the Tangerang river border, because the Bantenese often attacked suddenly. According to a map made in 1692, the oldest post is located at the mouth of the Cisadane River, to the north of Kampung Baru. However, when a new post was established, the location shifted to the south at the mouth of the Tangerang River. According to the archives of Gewone Resolutie van het Casteel Batavia, on April 3, 1705, there were plans to demolish the buildings in the post because they only had bamboo walls. Then the building was proposed to be replaced with a wall. Governor-General Hendrick Zwaardecroon strongly agreed with the proposal, and was even instructed to build a wallei fence around the buildings in the guard posts, so that the Bantenese could not attack. The new fort that would be built was planned to have a wall 20 feet thick or more. There will be placed 30 Europeans under the leadership of a Vandrig and 28 Makassarese who will live outside the fort. The basic material for the fort is bricks obtained from Tangerang Regent Aria Soetadilaga I.

After the fort was completed it was manned by 60 Europeans and 30 Blacks as well as Makassarese recruited as VOC soldiers. This fort later became the base of the VOC in the face of the rebellion from Banten. Then in 1801, it was decided to repair and strengthen the post or garrison, with a new building located 60 meters to the southeast, precisely located east of Jalan Besar PAL 17. Indigenous people at that time were more familiar with this building as "Fortress". .Since then, Tangerang is known as the Citadel. This fort since 1812 has not been maintained anymore, even according to the "Superintendent of Public Building and Work" dated March 6, 1816 stated:

"... The fort and barracks in Tangerang are now neglected, no one wants to see them anymore. Many doors and windows were broken and people even took it for their own sake."

=== Indonesian revolution ===
In October 1945, Laskar Hitam, a Muslim militia, was established in Tangerang. The goal of this movement was to establish an Islamic nation in Indonesia. This movement later became a part of DI/TII rebel group. On 31 October 1945, Laskar Hitam kidnapped Otto Iskandardinata, the Republic of Indonesia's Minister of State. He was presumed to have been murdered at Mauk beach, Tangerang on 20 December 1945.

=== Recent history ===
Tangerang city was formed as an autonomous city on 27 February 1993 out of the Tangerang Regency. The city was previously an administrative city within that regency.

In 2007, the city government passed an anti-prostitution law, which meant that women who are perceived to be dressed too provocatively may be arrested. Some news outlets reported that some women decided to wear the hijab to avoid being prosecuted under this law. In addition the city government began requiring municipal employees to abide by Islamic dress codes.

In 2021, a fire at Tangerang prison killed at least 41 inmates and injured 80 people.

In September 2024, Alice Guo went back to the Philippines following her arrest in Tangerang.

== Geography ==
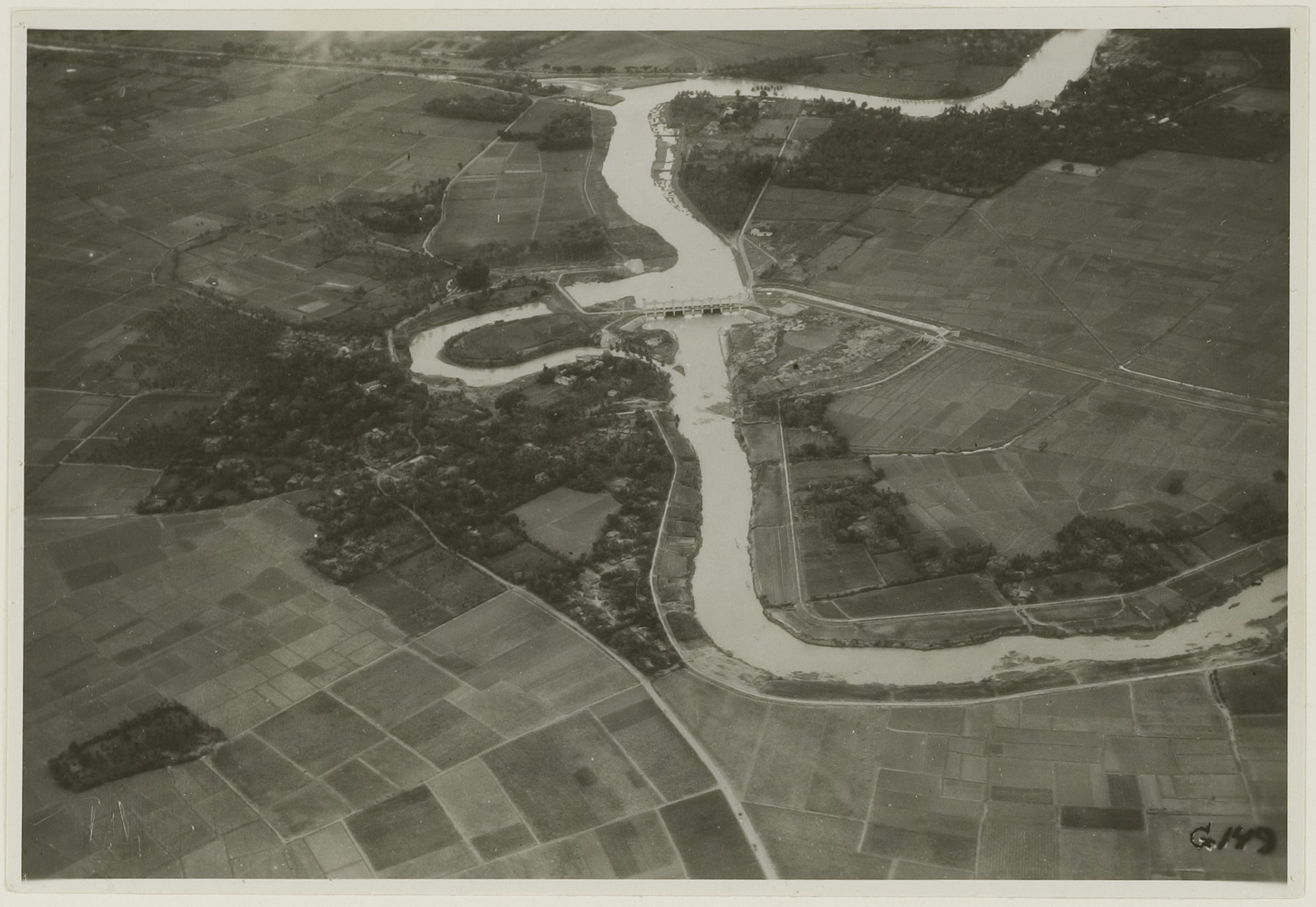
Situ Gintung reservoir around Cisadane river, Tangerang, circa 1940

Tangerang City is located in the northwest region of Banten Province and is on the north side of Java Island. Astronomically, the city is located 106°33'–106°44' east longitude and 6°05'–6°15 south latitude. Tangerang City has an area of 164.55 km^{2}.[5]

The city is bordered by Tangerang Regency to the west and north, South Tangerang to the south, and Jakarta to the east. Cisadane River that crosses Tangerang City.

Tangerang City is crossed by one of the largest rivers in the west of Java, namely the Cisadane River. This river is an inseparable part of the identity of the City of Tangerang. The headwaters of this river are located on the slopes of Mount Salak and Mount Pangrango, Bogor.

=== Topography ===
Topographically, Tangerang City is mostly located at an altitude of 10–30 meters above sea level, aka the whole area is in the lowlands. The northern part of the city (covering most of Benda District) has an average height of 10 meters above sea level, while the southern part of Tangerang City has a height of 30 meters above sea level.

Furthermore, Tangerang City has a soil slope of 0–3% and a small part (i.e. in the southern part of the city) with a slope of between 3%–8% is in Parung Serab, Paninggilan and Cipadu Jaya.

=== Climate ===
Situated in the alluvial lowland, Tangerang City has a tropical rainforect climate (Köppen: Af) bordering upon a tropical monsoon climate (Am), with moderate rainfall from May to October and heavy rainfall from November to April.

Climate data for Tangerang
Month	Jan	Feb	Mar	Apr	May	Jun	Jul	Aug	Sep	Oct	Nov	Dec	Year
Mean daily maximum °C (°F)	30.9 (87.6)	31.0 (87.8)	31.7 (89.1)	32.5 (90.5)	32.7 (90.9)	32.8 (91.0)	32.9 (91.2)	33.2 (91.8)	33.7 (92.7)	33.6 (92.5)	32.9 (91.2)	32.0 (89.6)	32.5 (90.5)
Daily mean °C (°F)	27.0 (80.6)	27.0 (80.6)	27.4 (81.3)	27.9 (82.2)	27.9 (82.2)	27.7 (81.9)	27.4 (81.3)	27.6 (81.7)	28.0 (82.4)	28.1 (82.6)	28.0 (82.4)	27.5 (81.5)	27.6 (81.7)
Mean daily minimum °C (°F)	23.2 (73.8)	23.1 (73.6)	23.1 (73.6)	23.3 (73.9)	23.2 (73.8)	22.6 (72.7)	22.0 (71.6)	22.0 (71.6)	22.3 (72.1)	22.7 (72.9)	23.1 (73.6)	23.0 (73.4)	22.8 (73.1)
Average rainfall mm (inches)	346 (13.6)	270 (10.6)	223 (8.8)	169 (6.7)	119 (4.7)	94 (3.7)	73 (2.9)	68 (2.7)	87 (3.4)	122 (4.8)	149 (5.9)	202 (8.0)	1,922 (75.8)
Source: Climate-Data.org

== Government ==
=== Politics ===
Arief Rachadiono Wismansyah is the current mayor of Tangerang, having served since 2013. His tenure is set to end in December 2023. The municipal legislature is the Tangerang City Regional People's Representative Council, which has 50 members. The city is counted as two electoral districts (7th and 8th) in the provincial legislature with 16 of 100 seats, and is nationally represented as part of the Banten III electoral district.

=== Administrative districts ===
The city of Tangerang is divided into thirteen districts (kecamatan), tabulated below with their areas and populations at the 2010 Census and the 2020 Census, together with the official estimates as of mid-2024. The table also includes the number of administrative villages (all classed as urban kelurahan) in each district, and the names of these villages with their postal codes.

Kode Wilayah	Name of District (kecamatan)	Area in km^{2}	Pop'n Census 2010	Pop'n Census 2020	Pop'n Estimate mid 2024	No. of villages	Villages (kelurahan) (with their Post codes)
36.71.01	Tangerang (district)	15.79	126,244	153,859	166,324	8	Babakan (15118), Buaran Indah (15119), Cikokol (15117), Kelapa Indah (15117), Suka Asih (15111), Sukarasa (15111), Sukasari (15118), Tanah Tinggi (15119).
36.71.02	Jatiuwung	14.41	120,216	102,053	107,099	6	Alam Jaya (15133), Gandasari (15137), Jatake (15136), Keroncong (15134), Manis Jaya (15136), Pasir Jaya (15135).
36.71.03	Batuceper	11.58	90,590	92,044	96,023	7	Batuceper (15122), Batujaya (15121), Batusari (15121), Kebon Besar (15122), Poris Gaga (15122), Poris Gaga Baru (15122), Poris Jaya (15122).
36.71.04	Benda	5.92	83,017	83,526	86,305	5	Belendung (15123), Benda (15125), Jurumudi (15124), Jurumudi Baru (15124), Pajang (15126).
36.71.05	Cipondoh	17.91	216,346	248,212	235,119	10	Cipondoh (15148), Cipondoh Indah (15148), Cipondoh Makmur (15148), Gondrong (15146), Kenanga (15146), Ketapang (15147), Petit (15147), Poris Plawad (15141), Poris Plawad Indah (15141), Poris Plawad Utara (15141).
36.71.06	Ciledug ^{(a)}	8.77	147,023	164,151	152,418	8	Paninggilan (15153), Paninggilan Utara (15153), Parung Serab (15153), Sudimara Barat (15151), Sudimara Jaya (15151), Sudimara Selatan (15151), Sudimara Timur (15151), Tajur (15152).
36.71.07	Karawaci	13.48	171,317	184,388	193,426	16	Bojong Jaya (15115), Bugel (15113), Cimone (15114), Cimone Jaya (15116), Gerendeng (15113), Karawaci (15115), Karawaci Baru (15116), Koang Jaya (15112), Margasari (15113), Nambo Jaya (15112), Nusa Jaya (15116), Pabuaran (15114), Pabuaran Tumpeng (15112), Pasar Baru (15112), Sukajadi (15113), Sumur Pacing (15114).
36.71.08	Periuk	9.54	129,384	141,003	145,042	5	Gebang Raya (15132), Gembor (15133), Periuk (15131), Periuk Jaya (15131), Sangiang (15132).
36.71.09	Cibodas	9.61	142,479	147,279	158,449	6	Cibodas (15138), Cibodasari (15138), Cibodas Baru (15138), Jatiuwung (15134), Panunggangan Barat (15139), Uwung Jaya (15138).
36.71.10	Neglasari	16.08	103,504	115,520	125,683	7	Karang Anyar (15121), Karangsari (15121), Kedaung Baru (15128), Kedaung Wetan (15128), Mekarsari (15129), Neglasari (15129), Selapajang Jaya (15127).
36.71.11	Pinang	21.59	160,206	180,131	188,590	11	Cipete (15142), Kunciran (15144), Kunciran Indah (15144), Kunciran Jaya (15144), Nerogtog (15145), Pakojan (15142), Panunggangan (15143), Panunggangan Timur (15143), Panunggangan Utara (15143), Pinang (15145), Sudimara Pinang (15145).
36.71.12	Karang Tengah	10.47	118,473	117,721	119,458	7	Karang Mulya (15157), Karang Tengah (15157), Karang Timur (15157), Parang Jaya (15159), Pedurenan (15159), Pondok Bahar (15159), Pondok Pucung (15158).
36.71.13	Larangan ^{(a)}	9.40	163,901	165,599	153,879	8	Cipadu (15155), Cipadu Jaya (15155), Gaga (15154), Kreo (15156), Kreo Selatan (15156), Larangan Indah (15154), Larangan Selatan (15154), Larangan Utara (15154).
	Totals	164.55	1,798,601	1,895,486	1,927,815	104	

Note: (a) Ciledug and Larangan Districts are situated in the southeast corner of Tangerang City, and are geographically more aligned with South Tangerang City.

== Economy ==
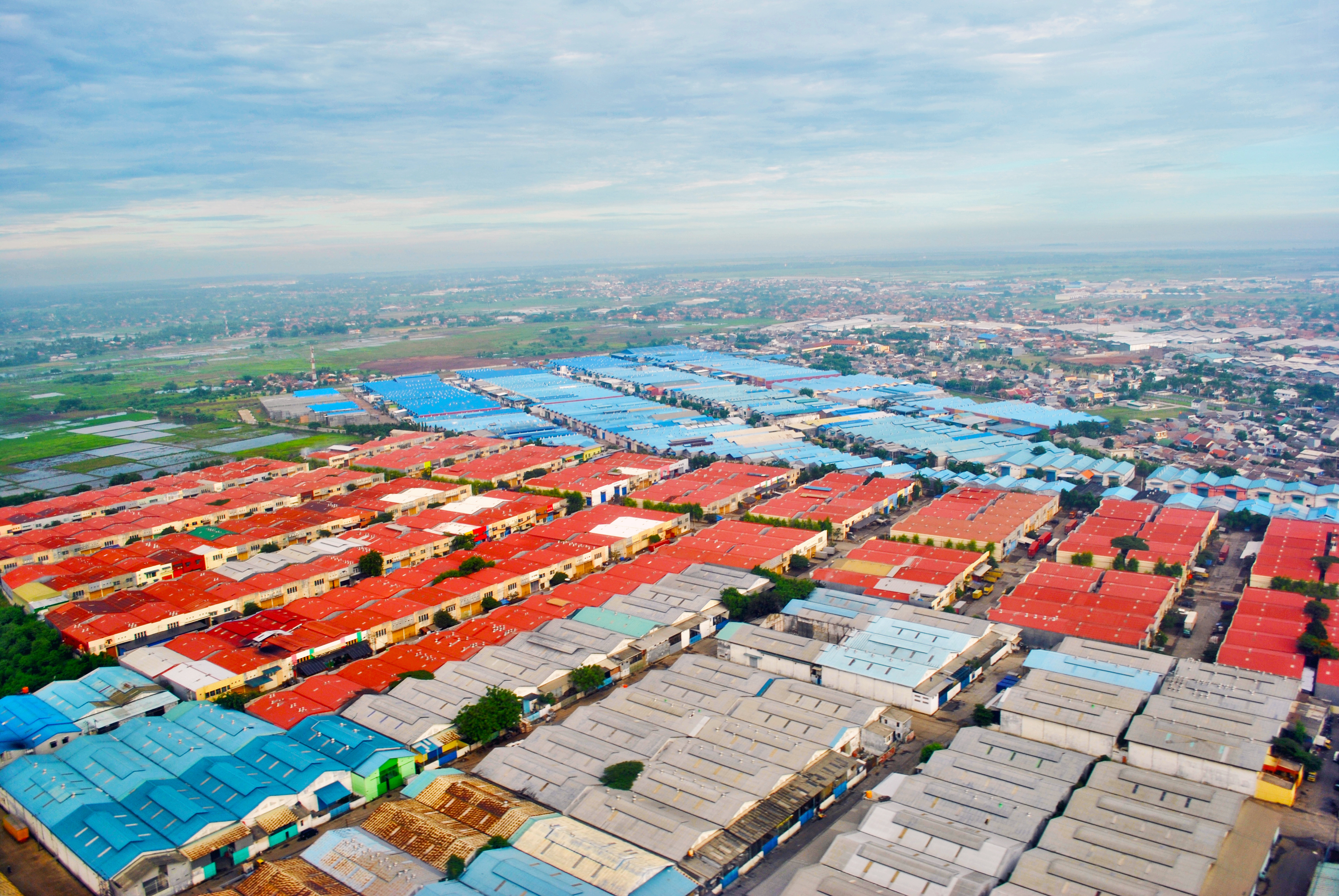
Industrial complex in Tangerang

Tangerang is the center of manufacturing and industry on the island of Java and has more than 1000 factories. Many international companies have factories in this city. Tangerang has a climate that tends to be hot and humid, with little forest or other geographic areas. Certain areas consist of swamps, including the area around Soekarno-Hatta International Airport.

In recent years, Jakarta's urban expansion has encompassed Tangerang, and as a result many residents commute to Jakarta for work, or vice versa. Many middle-class and upper-class satellite cities are being developed in Tangerang, complete with shopping centers, private schools and mini markets. The government is working on developing a toll road system to accommodate the increasing traffic flow to and from Tangerang. Tangerang was once part of the West Java Province whose western and northwestern cities and regencies were separated off in 2000 to become the new Banten Province.

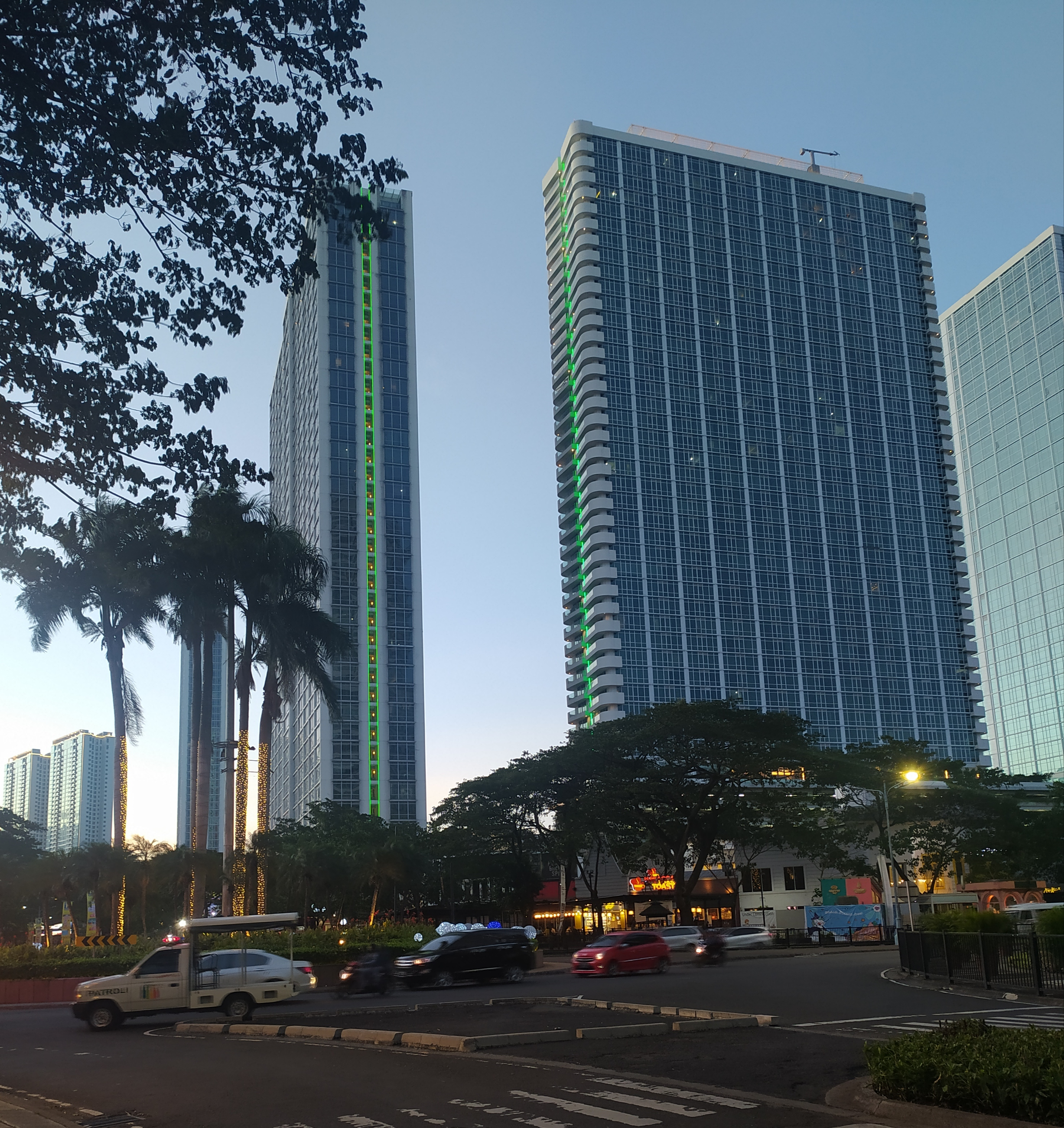
Office and apartment towers in Karawaci, Tangerang

Tangerang's economy depends highly on service sectors, trading, financial service, and manufacturing. Jatake, which is Tangerang's biggest industrial area, is home to over 1,000 industrial corporations.

As the impact of Jakarta's growing economy continues, Tangerang has become an alternative location for some corporations in which to build their offices due to crowds and land prices. CBD in Alam Sutera is the notable central business district, comprising several corporations, business centers, apartments, and educational facilities. Some headquarters of big corporations are located here, such as Kino Group, Alfamart, Deltomed, Top Food, and more. It also has several business center nearby, such as Lippo Karawaci and Gading Serpong, both are located in Tangerang Regency.

Garuda Indonesia, and Sriwijaya Air have their head offices at Soekarno–Hatta International Airport.

There are plans by CFLD Indonesia to develop part of Tangerang, namely Tangerang New City, into the most advanced new industrial township which will encompass 4 pillars industry park – Electronics & ICT, Construction Materials, Automotive and Machinery & Equipment Industrial Parks.

== Demographics ==
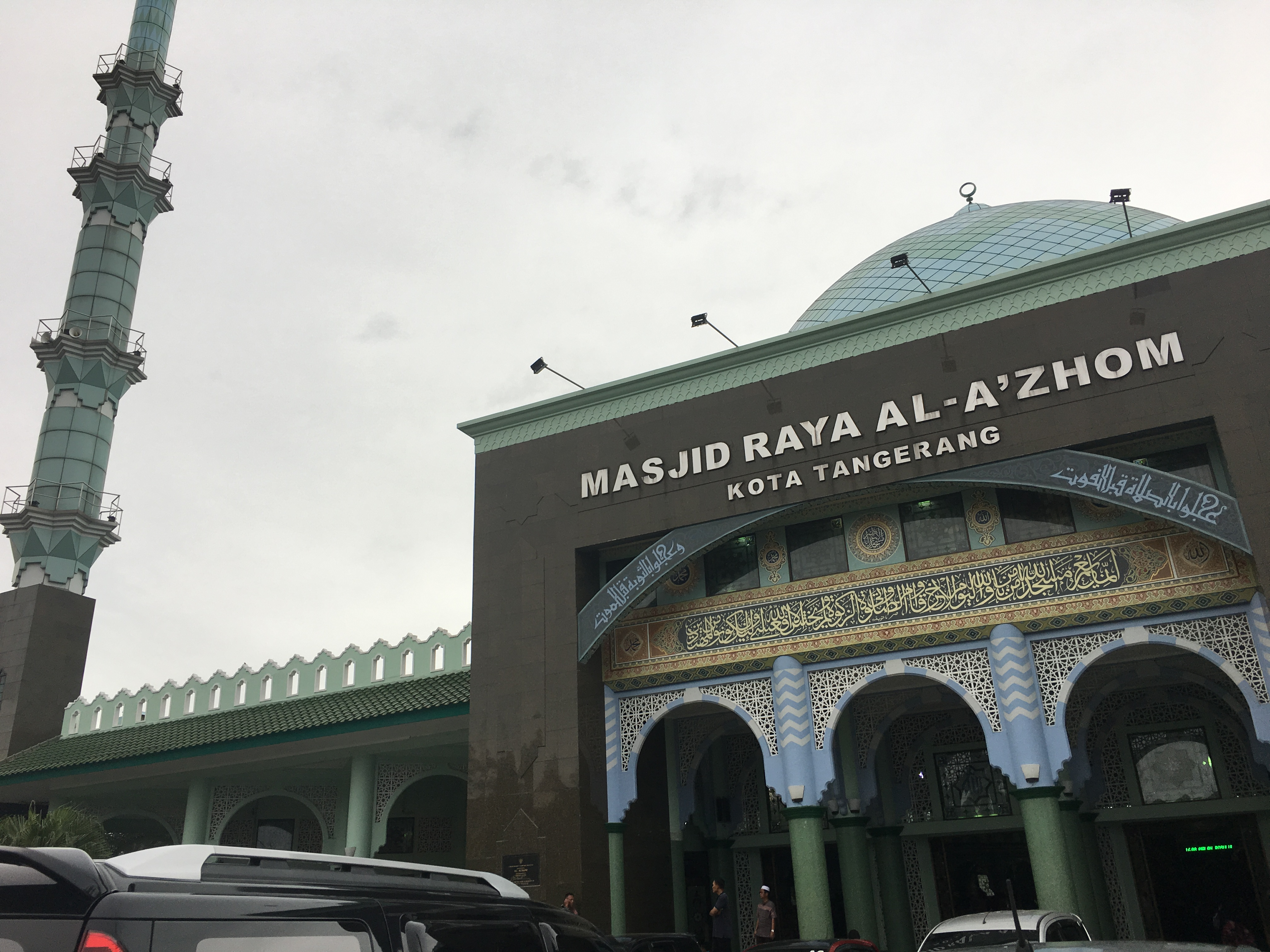
Al-Azhom Grand Mosque is the largest mosque in Tangerang

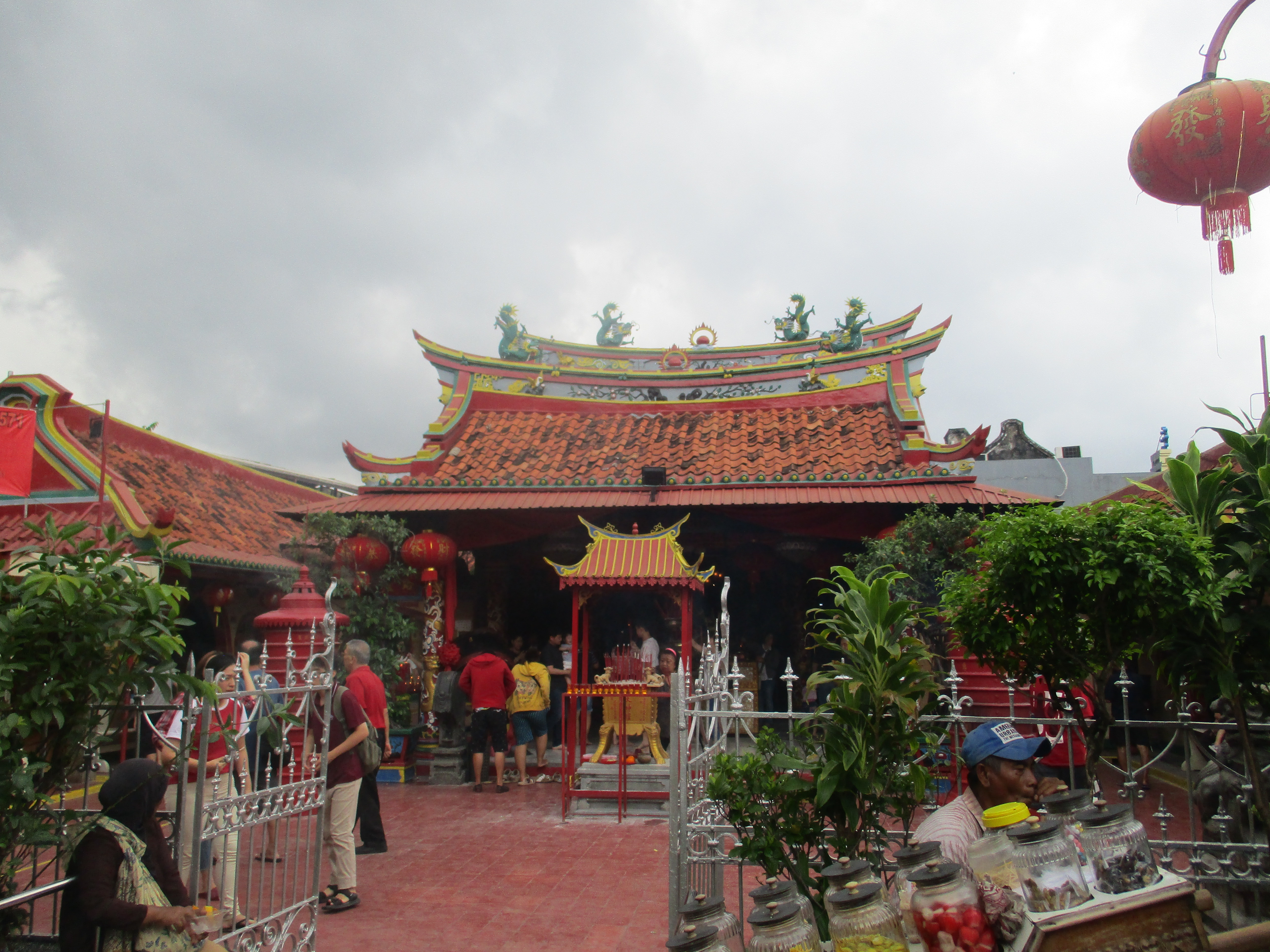
Boen Tek Bio is the Taoist Temple in Tangerang with Benteng Chinese

Tangerang has a significant community of Chinese Indonesians, many of whom are of Cina Benteng extraction. They are part of the country's Peranakan Chinese community, but with deep, centuries-old roots in the historic Tangerang area, also called 'Benteng' locally.

Most of the old settlements in Tangerang have colonial, Chinese districts, such as at Sewan, Pasar Lama, Pasar Baru, Benteng Makasar, Kapling and Karawaci Lama (the precursor to Lippo Karawaci). One can find any food and all things Chinese there. In addition, a large proportion of Benteng Chinese have traditionally been rural dwellers, engaged in agricultural activities, such as farming and livestock production.

Due to the growth of satellite towns in the greater Jakarta region, which includes Tangerang, the area is now home to many new migrants from all parts of Indonesia. Some notable planned town and housing complex in the city are Alam Sutera (the CBD area, while most of its area located in Serpong, South Tangerang city, Lippo Village (North), Banjar Wijaya, and Modernland (Kota Modern).

== Transportation ==
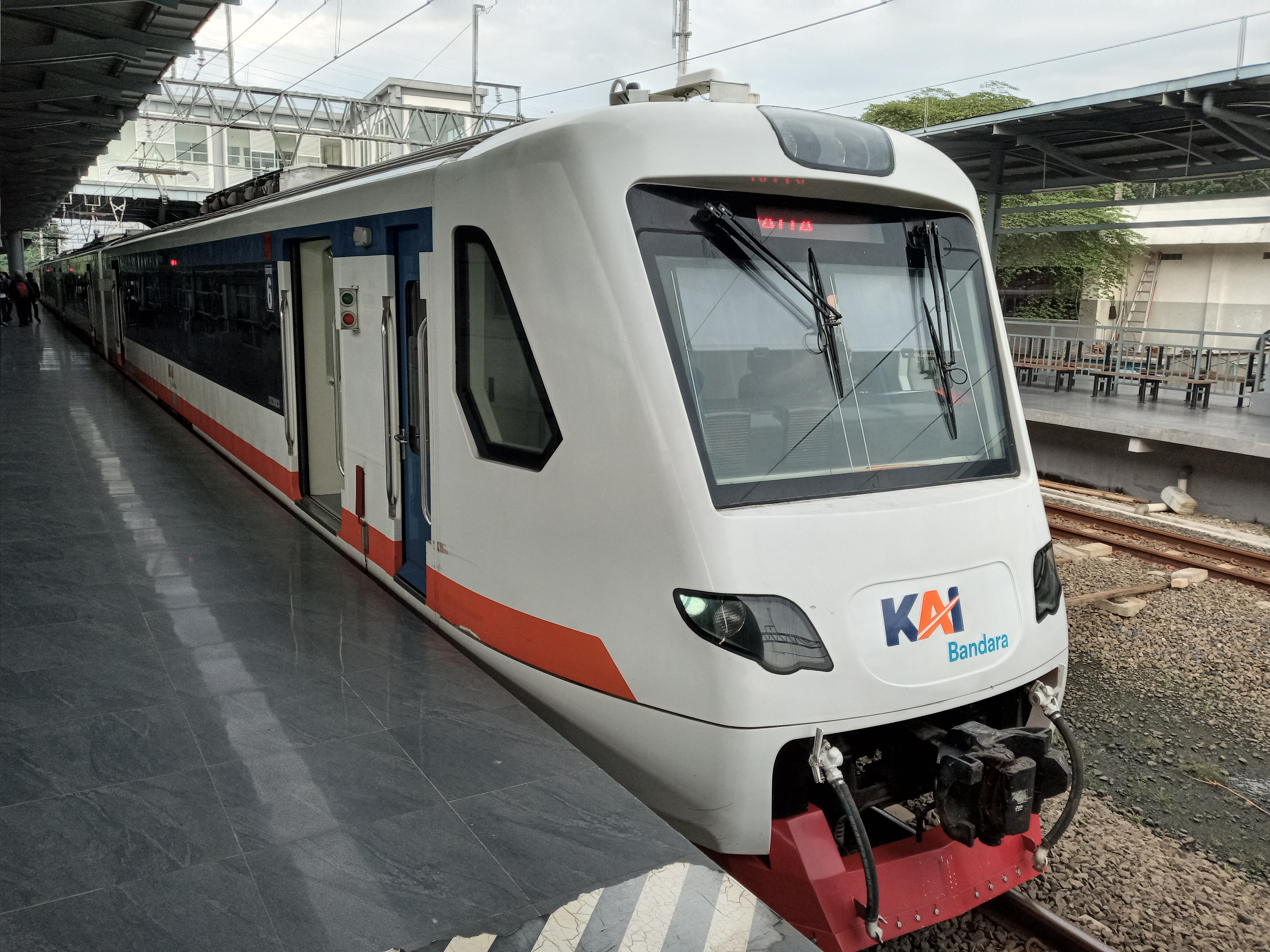
Soekarno–Hatta Airport Rail Link EA203 at the Batu Ceper railway station.

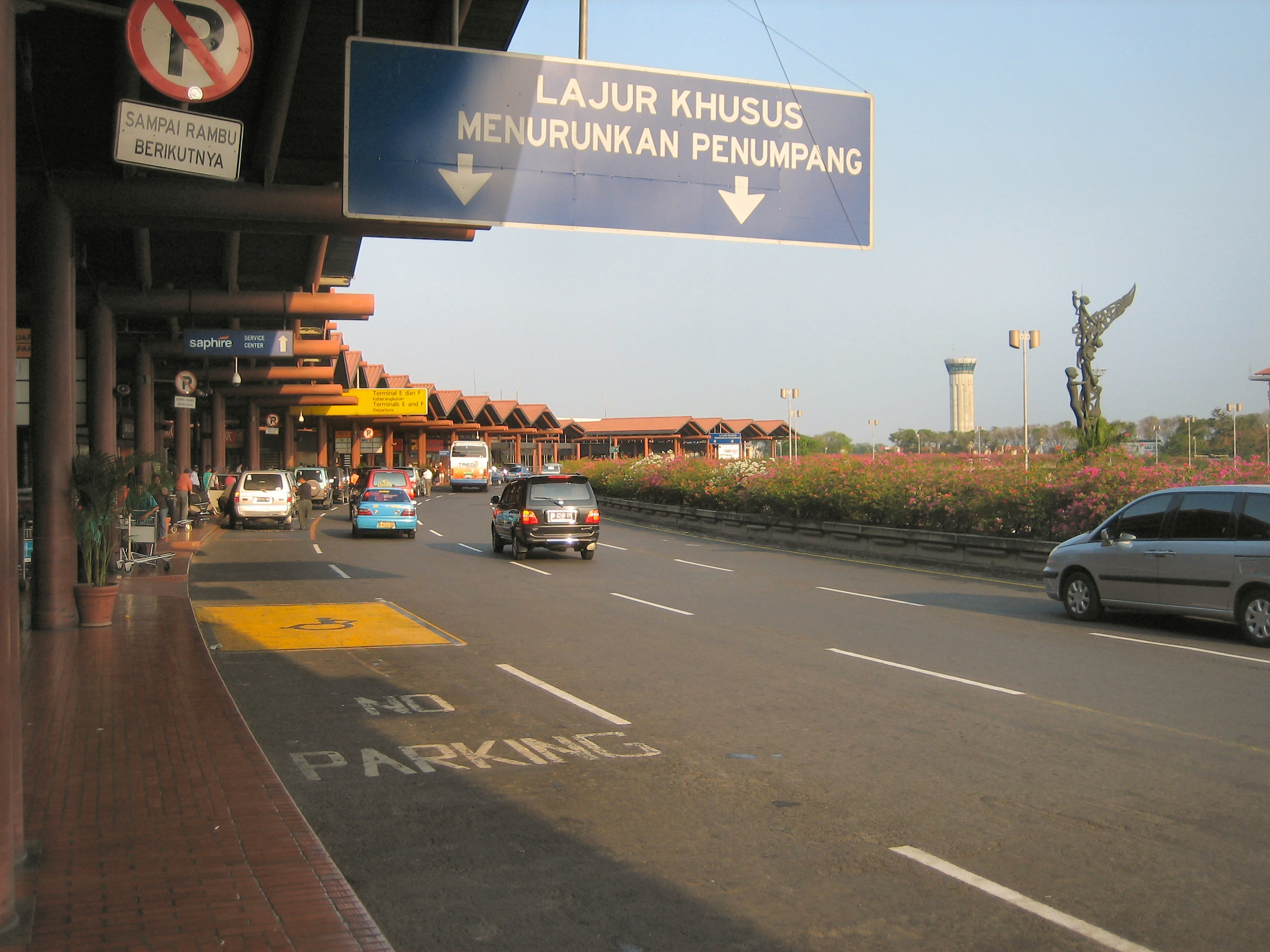
Soekarno-Hatta International Airport, Terminal 1

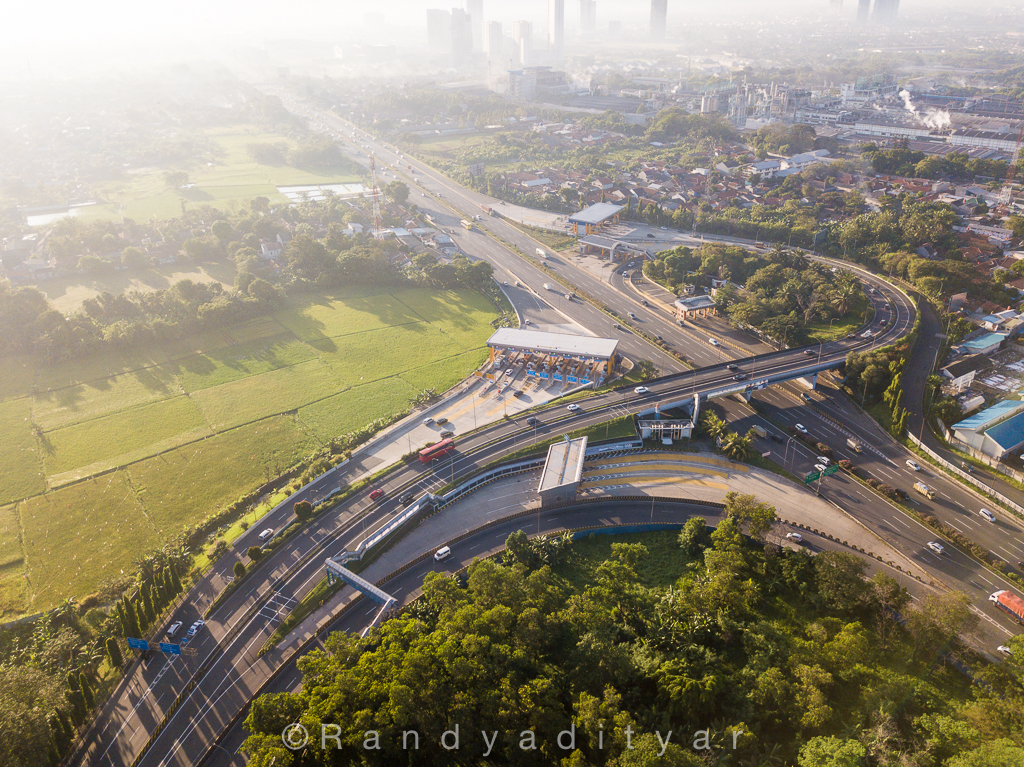
Tangerang-Toll interchange

Tangerang is connected to Trans-Java Toll Road, and the following are the roads and highway in the city :

Main Road :

- Jl. Jenderal Sudirman
- Jl. MH Thamrin
- Jl. Daan Mogot
- Jl. Gatot Subroto
- Jl. Hos Cokroaminoto
- Jl. Ciledug Raya

Highway :

- Jakarta-Tangerang Toll Road
- Tangerang-Merak Toll Road
- Cengkareng-Batuceper-Kunciran Toll Road
- Prof. Sedyatmo Toll Road (airport toll road)

Soekarno-Hatta International Airport is the main hub for air transport in Jakarta Metropolitan Area as well as Tangerang. Air-conditioned public bus shuttle is available from the airport to destinations in Jakarta. This is operated by DAMRI, a state-owned company.

Jakarta–Merak Toll Road and Cengkareng-Batuceper-Kunciran Toll Road provide highway connections from Jakarta and surrounding cities.

KRL Commuterline serves from either Batu Ceper, Poris, Tanah Tinggi or Tangerang stations to Duri, with connecting lines to stations across Jabodetabek. Soekarno-Hatta Airport Rail Link stops at Batu Ceper Station, providing direct access to Soekarno-Hatta International Airport via Soekarno-Hatta Airport Station and Soekarno-Hatta Airport Skytrain people mover.

In the future, Tangerang City will have Phase 3 of the Jakarta MRT from Cikarang to Balaraja

MRT Jakarta Phase 3, set to extend from Cikarang in the east to Balaraja in the west, is a transformative infrastructure project poised to significantly enhance the transportation network and foster economic development across the Jakarta metropolitan area. Specifically, Phase 3B, which will traverse the key areas of Kota Tangerang along the Jakarta-Merak Toll Road, is expected to bring substantial benefits to the region, both in terms of mobility and socio-economic growth. Below is a detailed analysis and comprehensive conclusion on the anticipated impacts and future prospects of this important infrastructure project for the Tangerang region

- Stations List:
- EW | Cikokol: Positioned strategically to serve the bustling area of Cikokol, this station will be a key hub for commuters and residents, providing easy access to local amenities and services.
- EW | Kebon Nanas: Serving the Kebon Nanas area, this station will connect a growing residential and commercial district, enhancing accessibility and fostering local development.
- EW | Panunggangan: Located in the CBD Alam Sutera, this station will enhance accessibility for residents and businesses in the area, while facilitating connections to key destinations within and beyond Tangerang.
- EW | Kunciran: Positioned to serve the Kunciran area, this station will improve access to nearby industrial zones and residential areas, promoting economic growth and urban development.
- EW | Hasyim Ashari: This station will provide critical access to educational institutions and commercial areas along Hasyim Ashari, boosting connectivity and supporting local businesses.
- EW | Karang Tengah: Serving Karang Tengah, this station will enhance transport options for residents and contribute to the overall accessibility of the area.
- Jakarta MRT phase 3 will be built in 2025

The Transjakarta Corridor 13 that serve CBD Ciledug – Tegal Mampang – CBD Ciledug.

The Transjakarta Corridor T11 that serve Bundaran Senayan – Poris Plawad – Bundaran Senayan

The feeder buses of Transjakarta serves commuters from Bumi Serpong Damai and Bintaro Jaya. There are also private shuttle bus services from Jakarta to private residential area such as Lippo Karawaci and Citra Raya.

The "Tayo" Trans Kota Tangerang Corridor 3 CBD Ciledug – TangCity – CBD Ciledug

Several taxi companies operating in the city, such as the express taxi, blue bird, and the local operator Arimbi.

There are 17 intersections prone to traffic congestion with the obsolete Multi Program Eight Phase System. By 2012, Tangerang will have a new technology, called the Intelligent Transport System (ITS), that uses a closed-circuit camera that responds to traffic conditions at any given intersection and could reduce the rate of congestion by 30 percent.

== Attractions ==
=== Al-A'zhom Mosque ===
Al-Azhom Grand Mosque is a congregational mosque at the alun-alun Tangerang. Opened in 2003, it is the largest mosque in Banten province. With the maximum capacity of 15,000 worshippers, it is one of the largest mosques in the world.

=== Benteng Heritage Museum ===
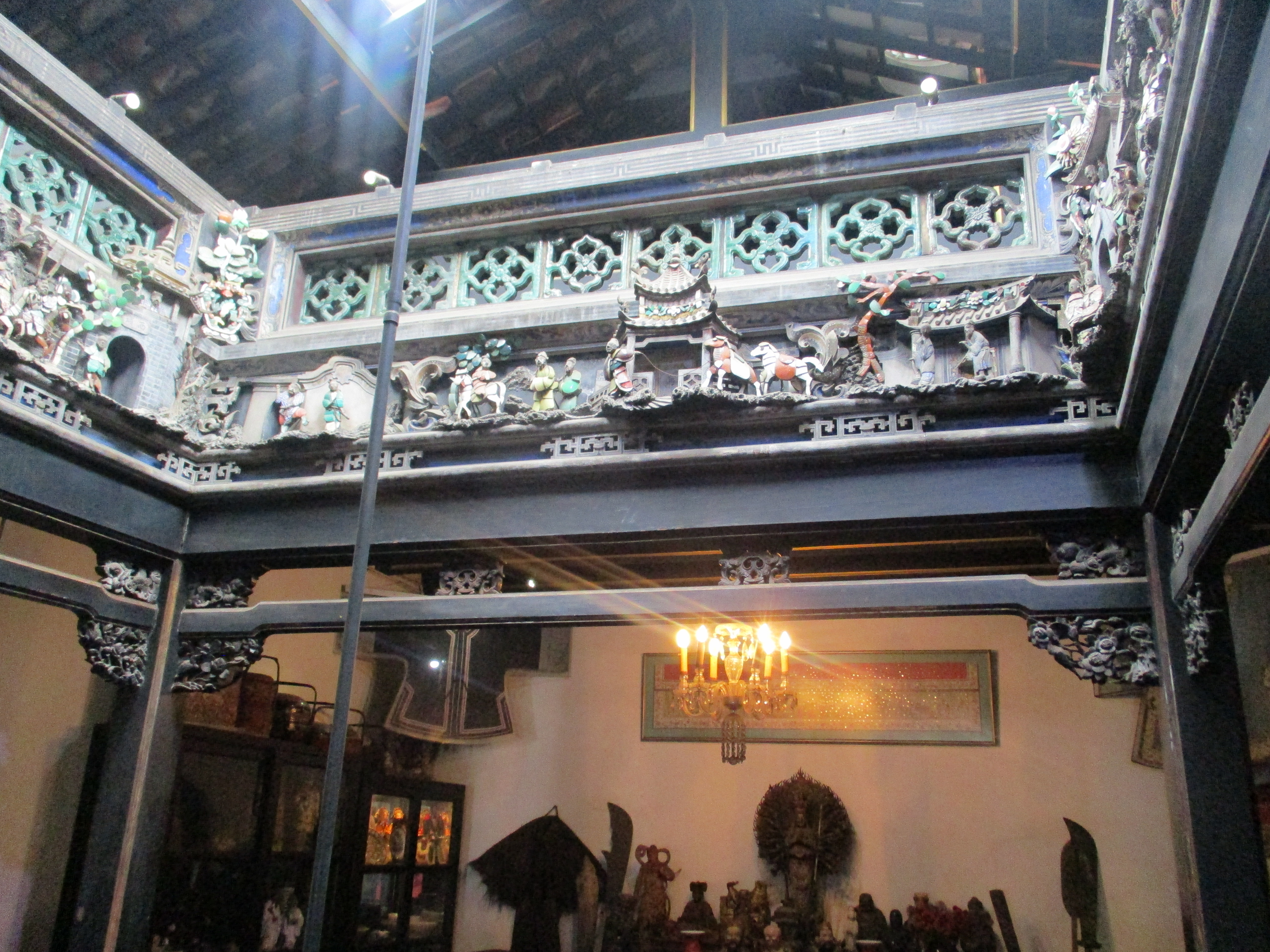
Interior of Benteng Heritage Museum

Benteng Heritage Museum is a historic townhouse that was restored and repurposed as a museum by a Benteng Chinese businessman Udaya Halim. It was opened on a specifically chosen auspicious date: November 11, 2011 or 11/11/11. The museum displays Benteng Chinese artefacts and other cultural objects related to the history of Tangerang's Chinese community.

=== Boen Tek Bio ===
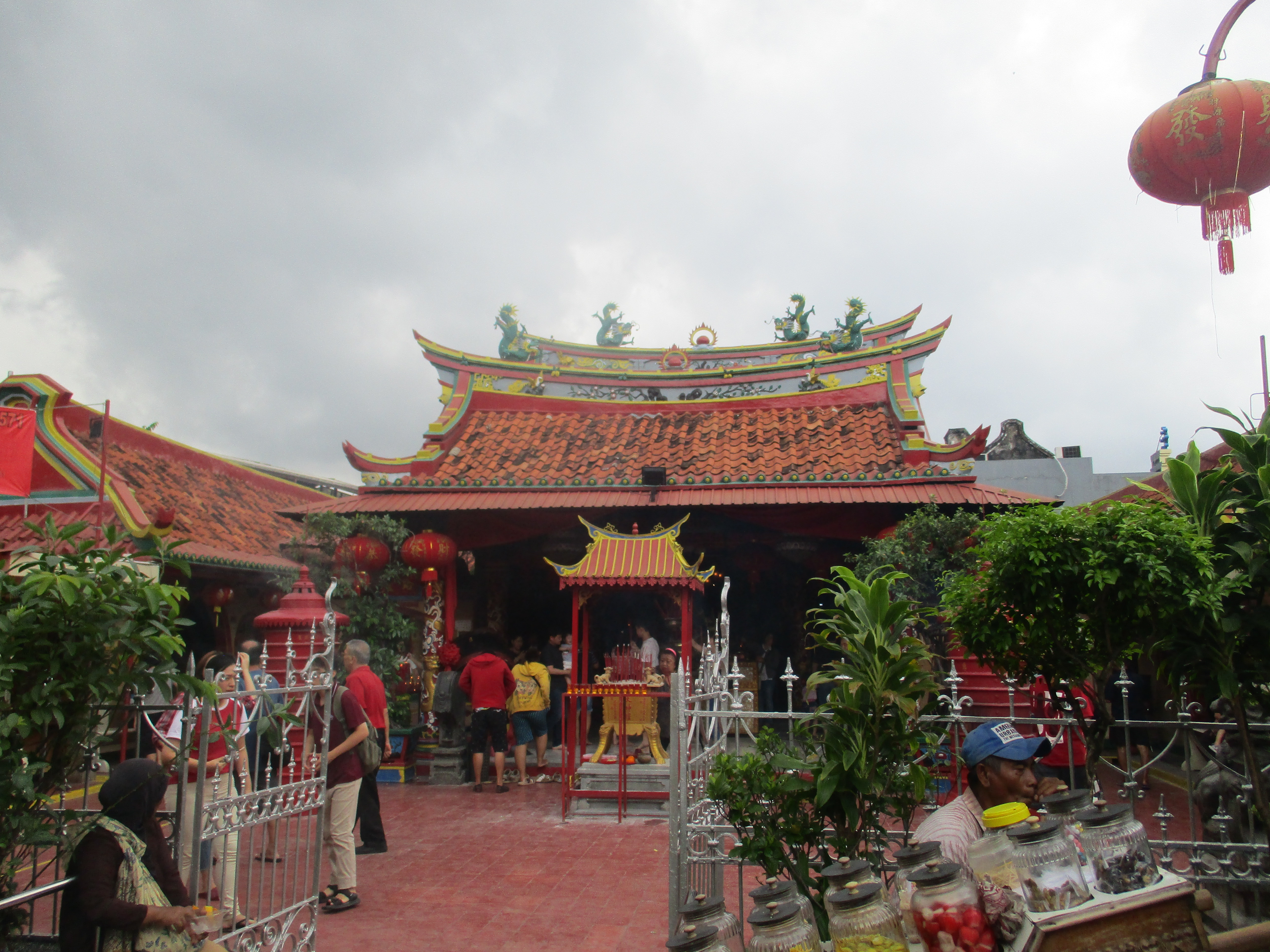
Boen Tek Bio in 2019.

Boen Tek Bio is the oldest Chinese temple, or klenteng, in Tangerang – with a history going back to 1684.

=== Kali Pasir Mosque ===
Kali Pasir Mosque is the oldest mosque in Tangerang city, established in 1700, and a relic of Pajajaran Kingdom. It is located in Cisadane riverbank, in the middle of Chinese residential and is characterized by Chinese pattern.

== Education ==
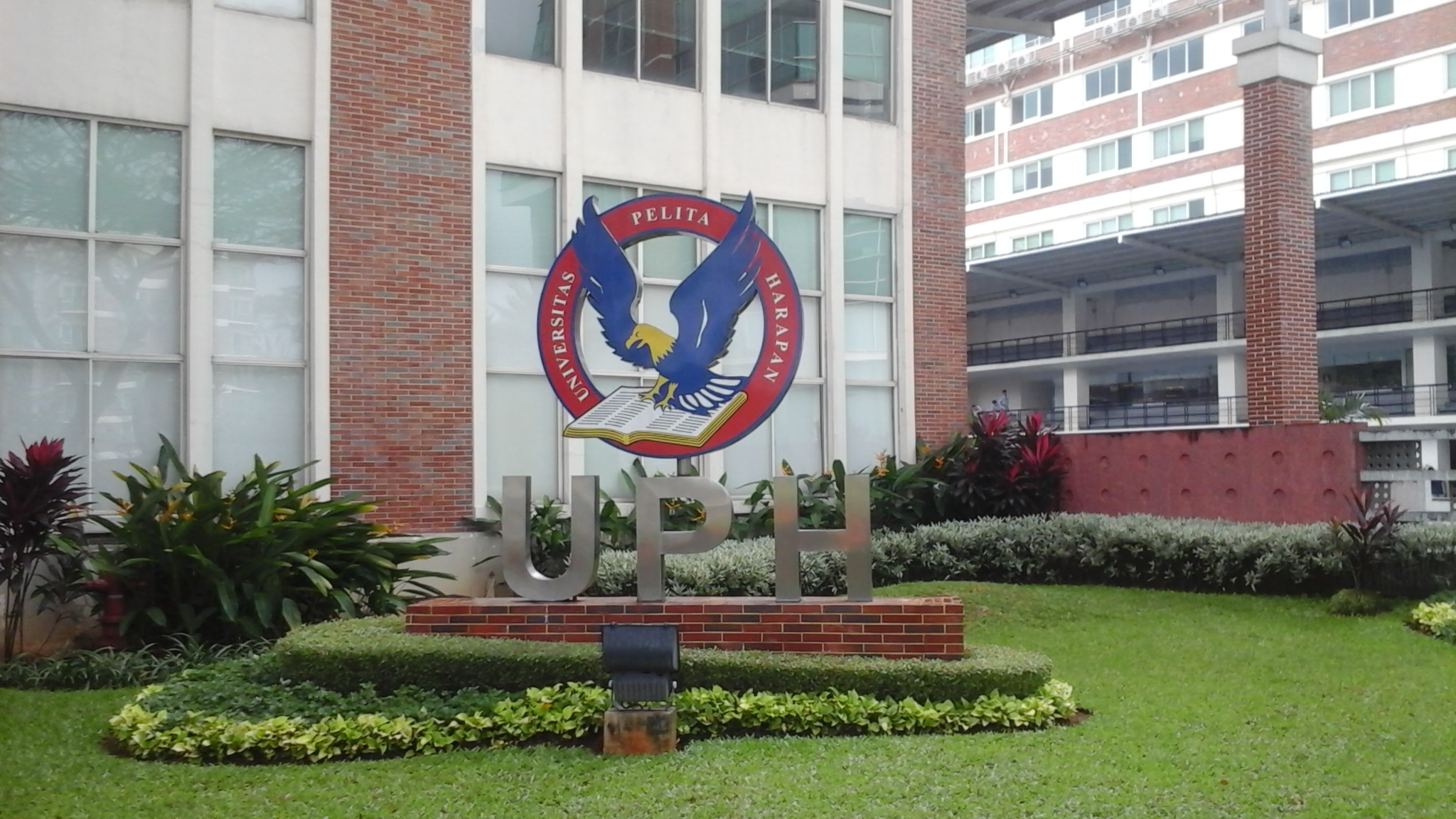
Pelita Harapan University

Tangerang provides educational facilities from kindergarten to college. In addition to government schools, there are many private schools such as :

- BPK Penabur Kota Tangerang (formerly BPK Penabur Kota Modern)
- Sekolah Dian Harapan, Lippo Village
- Sekolah Harapan Bangsa, Modernland
- Sekolah Yadika 3 (SD, SMP, SMA), Karang Tengah
- Sekolah Yadika 4 (SMK), Karang Tengah
- SMK Bhakti Anindya - one of the institutions managed by Widya Education Foundation Anindya
- SMK Farmasi Tangerang 1

It houses the following colleges and universities:

- Pelita Harapan University @ Lippo Village, Karawaci
- BINUS University Alam Sutera Campus
- Bunda Mulia University Alam Sutera Campus
- Muhammadiyah University Tangerang
- Swiss German University Alam Sutera Campus

Tangerang also provide daycare, preschool, and kindergarten:

- "Jackids Alam Sutera".

== Sister cities ==
- Newark, New Jersey, United States
- Bandar Seri Begawan, Brunei Darussalam
