= List of districts of Banten =

The province of Banten in Indonesia is divided into kabupaten or regencies which in turn are divided administratively into districts, known as kecamatan.

The districts of Banten (with the regency into which each falls) are as follows:

- Angsana, Pandeglang
- Anyar, Serang
- Balaraja, Tangerang
- Banjar, Pandeglang
- Banjarsari, Lebak
- Baros, Serang
- Batuceper, Tangerang
- Bayah, Lebak
- Benda, Tangerang
- Binuang, Serang
- Bojonegara, Serang
- Bojong, Pandeglang
- Bojongmanik, Lebak
- Cadasari, Pandeglang
- Carenang, Serang
- Carita, Pandeglang
- Cibadak, Lebak
- Cibaliung, Pandeglang Selatan
- Cibeber, Cilegon
- Cibeber, Lebak
- Cibitung, Pandeglang
- Cibodas, Tangerang
- Cigeulis, Pandeglang
- Cijaku, Lebak
- Cikande, Serang
- Cikedal, Pandeglang
- Cikeusal, Serang
- Cikeusik, Pandeglang
- Cikulur, Lebak
- Cikupa, Tangerang
- Ciledug, Tangerang
- Cilegon, Cilegon
- Cileles, Lebak
- Cilograng, Lebak
- Cimanggu, Pandeglang
- Cimanuk, Pandeglang
- Cimarga, Lebak
- Cinangka, Serang
- Ciomas, Serang
- Cipanas, Lebak
- Cipeucang, Pandeglang
- Cipocok Jaya, Serang
- Cipondoh, Tangerang
- Ciputat Timur, Tangerang Selatan
- Ciputat, Tangerang
- Ciputat, Tangerang Selatan
- Ciruas, Serang
- Cisata, Pandeglang
- Cisauk, Tangerang
- Cisoka, Tangerang
- Citangkil, Cilegon
- Ciwandan, Cilegon
- Curug, Serang
- Curug, Tangerang
- Curugbitung, Lebak
- Gerogol, Cilegon
- Gunungkaler, Tangerang
- Gunung Kencana, Lebak
- Jambe, Tangerang
- Jatiuwung, Tangerang
- Jawilan, Serang
- Jayanti, Tangerang
- Jiput, Pandeglang
- Jombang, Cilegon
- Kaduhejo, Pandeglang
- Karangtanjung, Pandeglang
- Karangtengah, Tangerang
- Karawaci, Tangerang
- Kasemen, Serang
- Kelapa Dua, Tangerang
- Kemiri, Tangerang
- Kibin, Serang
- Kopo, Serang
- Kosambi, Tangerang
- Kragilan, Serang
- Kramatwatu, Serang
- Kresek, Tangerang
- Kronjo, Tangerang
- Labuan, Pandeglang
- Larangan, Tangerang
- Legok, Tangerang
- Leuwidamar, Lebak
- Maja, Lebak
- Malingping, Lebak
- Mancak, Serang
- Mandalawangi, Pandeglang
- Mauk, Tangerang
- Mekarbaru, Tangerang
- Menes, Pandeglang
- Muncang, Lebak
- Munjul, Pandeglang
- Neglasari, Tangerang
- Pabuaran, Serang
- Padarincang, Serang
- Pagedangan, Tangerang
- Pagelaran, Pandeglang
- Pakuhaji, Tangerang
- Pamarayan, Serang
- Pamulang, Tangerang
- Pamulang, Tangerang Selatan
- Pandeglang, Pandeglang
- Panggarangan, Lebak
- Panimbang, Pandeglang
- Panongan, Tangerang
- Pasarkemis, Tangerang
- Patia, Pandeglang
- Periuk, Tangerang
- Petir, Serang
- Picung, Pandeglang
- Pinang, Tangerang
- Pondok Aren, Tangerang
- Pondok Aren, Tangerang Selatan
- Pontang, Serang
- Pulo Merak, Cilegon
- Puloampel, Serang
- Purwakarta, Cilegon
- Rajeg, Tangerang
- Rangkasbitung, Lebak
- Sajira, Lebak
- Saketi, Pandeglang
- Sepatan Timur, Tangerang
- Sepatan, Tangerang
- Serang, Serang
- Serpong Utara, Tangerang Selatan
- Serpong, Tangerang Selatan
- Setu, Tangerang Selatan
- Sindang Jaya, Tangerang
- Sobang, Lebak
- Solear, Tangerang
- Sukadiri, Tangerang
- Sukamulya, Tangerang
- Sukaresmi, Pandeglang
- Sumur, Pandeglang
- Taktakan, Serang
- Tanara, Serang
- Tangerang, Tangerang
- Teluknaga, Tangerang
- Tigaraksa, Tangerang
- Tirtayasa, Serang
- Tunjung Teja, Serang
- Walantaka, Serang
- Wanasalam, Lebak
- Waringinkurung, Serang
- Warunggunung, Lebak
