= Republic of Tangerang =

Indonesian revolutionary government (1945–1946)

People's Revolutionary Republic of Tangerang Republik Revolusioner Rakyat Tangerang
- 18 October 1945–14 January 1946
- Flag

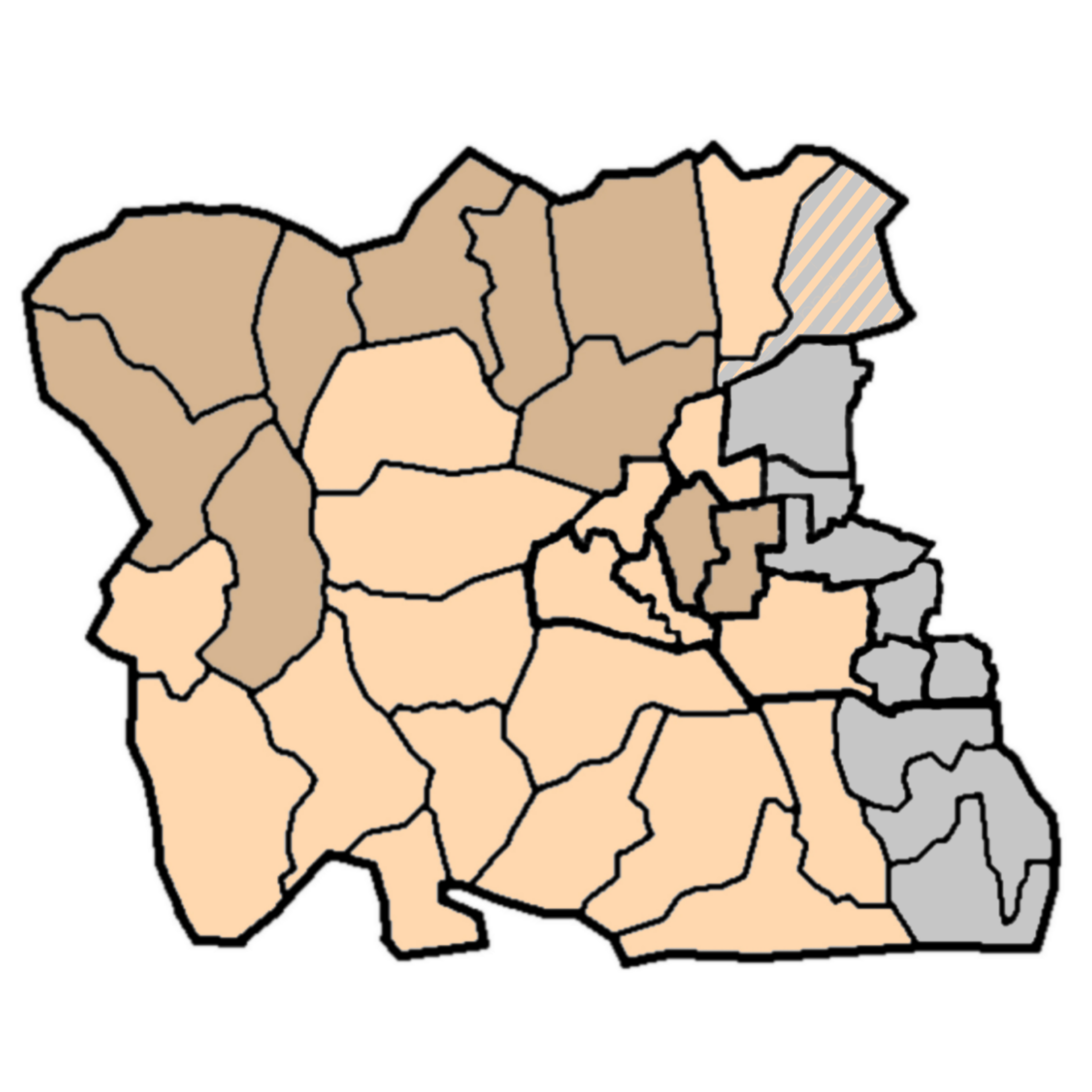
- Map of the Greater Tangerang area showing areas with the presence of participants of the Republic of Tangerang and the Black Militia (Milisi Hitam) in light brown, the possible presence of participants of the Republic of Tangerang and the Black Militia in cream, and the presence of People's Security Army (TKR) forces and pro-Republic of Indonesia loyalists in grey. (Note: Areas with the presence of participants of the Republic of Tangerang and the Black Militia included Balaraja, Karawaci, Kresek, Kronjo, Mauk, Pakuhaji, Sepatan, and Tangerang; areas with the 'possible' presence of participants of the Republic of Tangerang and the Black Militia included Legok, Rajeg, Serpong, Teluknaga, and Tigaraksa; areas with the 'possible' presence of the Republic of Tangerang–Black Militia participants and People's Security Army-pro-Republic of Indonesia loyalists included Kosambi; areas with the presence of the People's Security Army and pro-Republic of Indonesia loyalists included Benda, Ciledug, Ciputat, and Pamulang.)
- Status: Semi-independent
- Capital: Tangerang
- Common languages: Indonesian; Banten Sundanese; Serang Javanese; Betawi
- Government: Revolutionary republic under a provisional warlord government
- Regent
  - 1945–1946: Achmad Chaerun
- Historical era: Indonesian National Revolution
  - Established: 18 October 1945
  - Disestablished: 14 January 1946
- Currency: Netherlands Indies guilder
Preceded by	Succeeded by
Dutch East Indies	Republic of Indonesia

The Republic of Tangerang (Indonesian: Republik Tangerang; Van Ophuijsen spelling: Repoeblik Tangerang) was a short-lived, semi-independent revolutionary government declared by Achmad Chaerun, a communist leader from Tangerang, on 18 October 1945. Shortly after its establishment, the republican government was crushed by the People’s Security Army (TKR).

== History ==
In mid-October 1945, thousands of people from Karawaci and Sepatan gathered at the residence of the then regent of Tangerang, Agus Padmanegara, in Tangerang. Their goal was to overthrow the regent. However, it was discovered that Agus had already fled with his family as the revolutionary crowd surrounded his residence. A few days earlier, specifically on 18 October 1945, Achmad Chaerun declared the establishment of the revolutionary government of the Republic of Tangerang and proclaimed himself the "Father of the People of Tangerang". He also ordered the head of the Tangerang People’s Security Agency (BKR), Soetedjo, to mobilize thousands of people from Karawaci and Sepatan to surround the regent’s residence.

When the previous regent of Tangerang was successfully ousted, Achmad Chaerun subsequently declared himself the new regent of Tangerang. As a result, he unilaterally dismissed all local government officials (pamong praja), from district heads (camat) down to village chiefs (lurah). Various popular movements were mobilized to purge the remnants of the old administration, even at the local level. He then severed ties with the central government in Jakarta.

Once Achmad Chaerun’s administration took effect, various social problems began to emerge, ranging from intimidation and looting targeting the Chinese community in Tangerang to the growing number of paramilitary organizations established in the areas. Much of the paramillitary groups created held grievances over the proposed merging of the unification of former PETA, Heiho, and KNIL soldiers into the proposed People's Security Agency (BKR). One of these was the Laskar Pasukan Berani Mati (LPBM), also known as the Laskar Ubel-Ubel Hitam (later identified as the perpetrators of the kidnapping of Oto Iskandar di Nata and his murder on Tanjung Kait Beach, Mauk), which was founded by Syekh Abdullah.

From November to December 1945, the Chinese community living in Sepatan, Mauk, Kronjo, Kresek, and Pakuhaji on the northern coast of Tangerang, along with Tangerang civil servants, evacuated to Tangerang City, as the areas outside Tangerang City were no longer safe. The central government in Jakarta, only 25 km from Tangerang, was unable to take any action, and Achmad Chaerun, as the head of the Tangerang region, was also powerless to prevent these "popular uprisings". The Laskar Hitam grew increasingly rampant, attacking those who remained loyal to the central government.

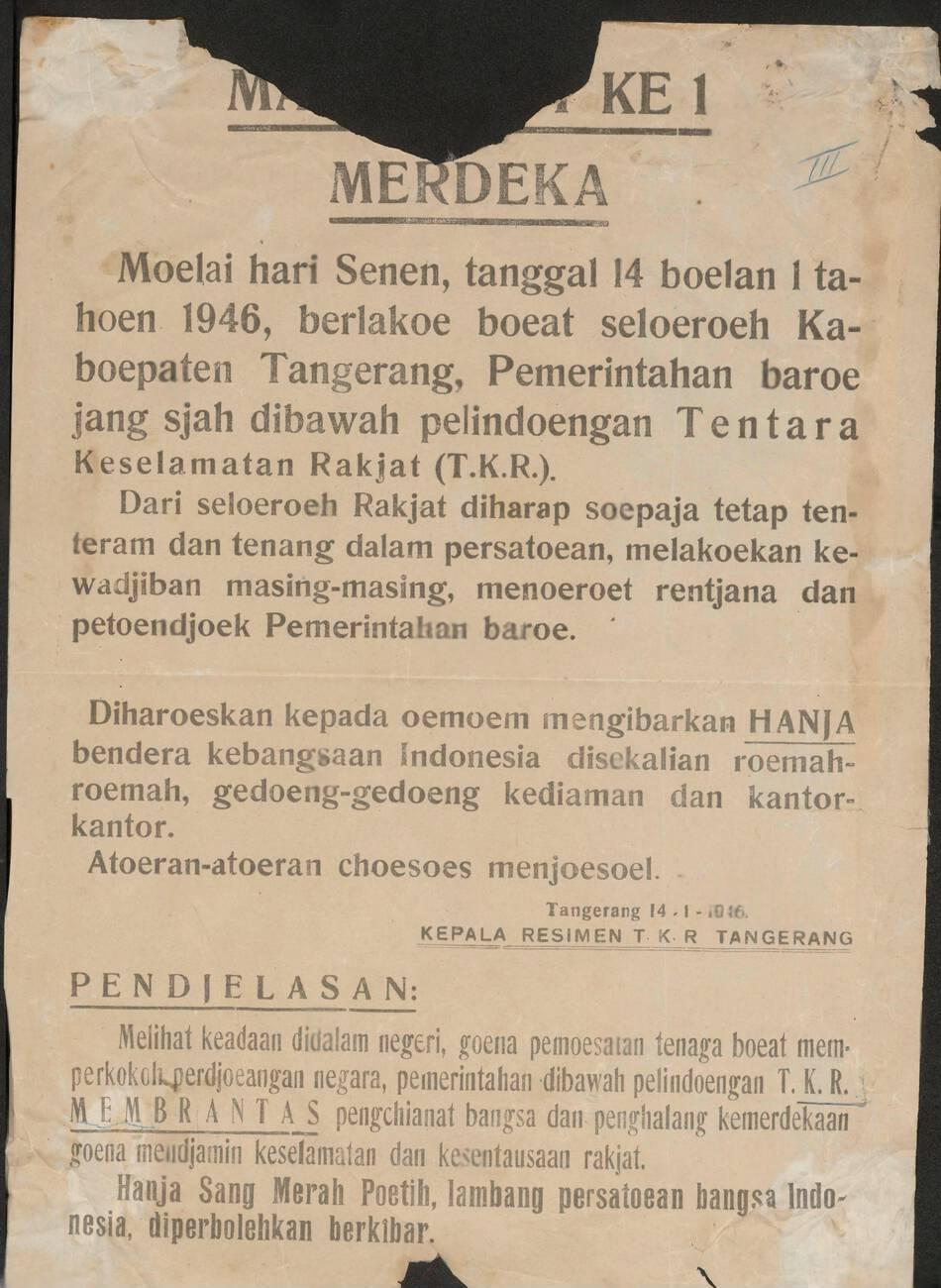
A proclamation issued in Tangerang on 14 January 1946 announcing a new local government under the protection of the Tentara Keselamatan Rakyat (TKR).

As the situation in Tangerang spiraled out of control, the People’s Security Army (TKR) took swift action through its 4th Regiment to seize control of the government from Chaerun. A decree issued by the TKR in Tangerang stated that, effective 14 January 1946, Chaerun’s government had been overthrown and Tangerang was officially placed under the protection of the People’s Security Army (TKR). Tangerang leaders such as Achmad Chaerun, Haji Alibasyah, Haji Muhur, Haji Arsyad, Haji Saelan, and Abbas were subsequently exiled to Selabintana in Sukabumi, under the strict supervision of Didi Kartasasmita, commander of the TKR West Java I Command.

== Leadership ==
There was only one leader (at the level of regent) in the revolutionary government of the Republic of Tangerang, namely Achmad Chaerun who was the founder and last leader until his exile.

== See also ==
- Tangerang
- Tangerang Regency
- History of Indonesia
- Indonesian National Revolution
- Gemeente Depok
