= Serpong–Balaraja Toll Road =

Toll road in Indonesia

- Jalan Tol Serpong–Balaraja
- Serbaraja Toll Road
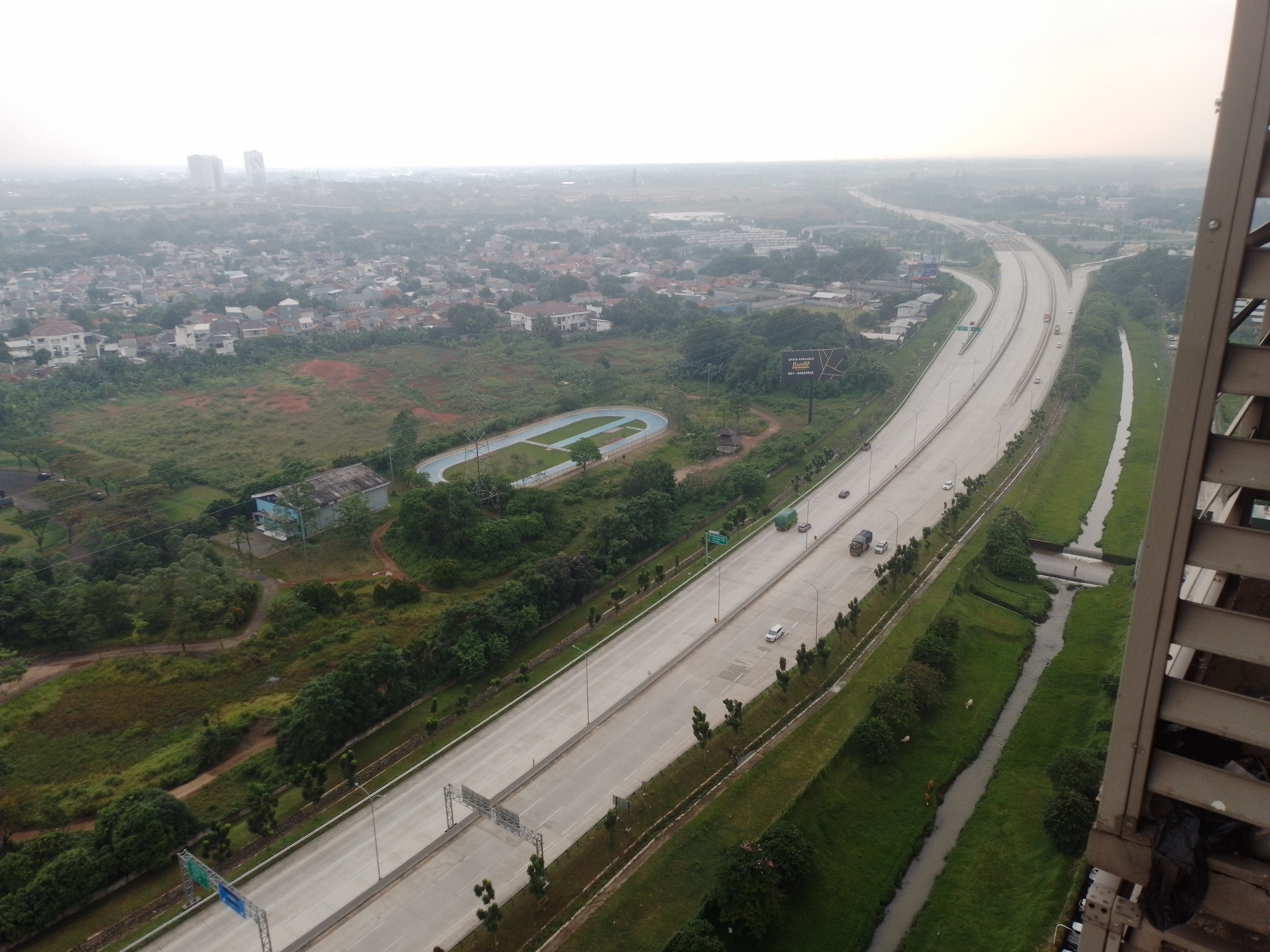

Route information
- Maintained by Trans Bumi Serbaraja
- Length: 39.8 km (24.7 mi)
- Existed: 20 September 2022–present

Major junctions
- Southeast end: Serpong
- Jakarta–Serpong Toll Road; AH2 – Tangerang–Merak Toll Road
- Northwest end: Balaraja

Location
- Country: Indonesia
- Major cities: South Tangerang; Tangerang Regency

Highway system
- Transport in Indonesia

The Serpong–Balaraja Toll Road (shortened to Serbaraja Toll Road) is a toll road that connects Serpong with Balaraja, Tangerang Regency in the province of Banten, Indonesia. An extension from the Jakarta–Serpong Toll Road, it will provide access from Serpong to the Port of Merak via the Tangerang–Merak Toll Road.

== History ==
Construction was initially scheduled to commence in 2016, but was delayed because of land acquisition issues. Construction of section 1A was completed in April 2022, and was opened for free public testing from 10 to 21 August 2022. The toll road was officially inaugurated on 20 September 2022. On 4 October 2022, The Ministry of Public Works and Housing officially imposed tariffs for Section 1A.

== Building stages ==
- Section 1: Rawabuntu–Legok (11.3 km). Rawabuntu–Cisauk segment by Wijaya Karya, Cisauk–Legok segment by Nusa Raya Cipta
- Section 2: Legok–South Tigaraksa (10.7 km)
- Section 3: South Tigaraksa–Balaraja (17.8 km)

== Exits ==
notes=Eastbound exit & Westbound entry only

Province	Location	km	mi	Exit	Name	Destinations	Notes
Banten	South Tangerang	12	7.5	12	BSD Interchange	Jakarta–Serpong Toll Road; Pondok Aren; Bintaro Jaya; Pondok Indah; Jakarta	Eastern terminus
Banten	South Tangerang	14	8.7	14	Cilenggang Toll Gate	Cilenggang; Serpong	
Banten	Tangerang Regency	16	9.9	16	BSD Timur Toll Gate	BSD City; Indonesia Convention Exhibition; Cisauk; Sampora	
Banten	Tangerang Regency	19	12	19	Industri Toll Gate	Industrial Complex; Cicayur	
Banten	Tangerang Regency	21	13	21	Legok Toll Gate	Legok; Jatake; Karawaci	
Banten	Tangerang Regency	28	17	28	Mekar Jaya Toll Gate	Mekar Jaya; Curug; Budiarto Airport	
Banten	Tangerang Regency	32	20	32	Pasir Barat Toll Gate	Kutruk; Pasir Barat; Tigaraksa	
Banten	Tangerang Regency	35	22	35	Jambe Toll Gate	Jambe; Tigaraksa	
Banten	Tangerang Regency	39	24	39	Cileles Toll Gate	Cileles; Jasinga; Leuwialang	
Banten	Tangerang Regency	42	26	42	Tigaraksa Toll Gate	Tigaraksa; Cangkudu; Cisoka	
Banten	Tangerang Regency	51	32	51	Balaraja Interchange	Tangerang–Merak Toll Road; Westbound; Cikande; Serang; Port of Merak; Eastbound; Cikupa; Jakarta–Tangerang Toll Road; Tangerang; Kebon Jeruk; Jakarta	
Banten	Tangerang Regency	1.000 mi = 1.609 km; 1.000 km = 0.621 mi: Electronic toll collection; Incomplete access; Route transition; Unopened					
