= Samanea Jakarta Market =

- Type: Private
- Industry: Wholesale and Trade
- Owner: Samanea Group
- Website: jakarta.samanea.com

Samanea Jakarta Market is a wholesale and retail market located in Tangerang New City, Jakarta, Indonesia. It is currently managed and owned by Samanea Group, a developer based in Singapore. It covers an area of 96,000 sqm and was built out of "containers", becoming the first market in Indonesia made of containers. It has 403 retail outlets including restaurants.

== History ==
On 6 May 2019, Samanea Group and CFLD International signed an agreement to purchase the 7.6 hectare land at Tangerang New Industry City (TNIC).

On 24 June 2020, Samanea Group and CFLD International closed a second deal on 9.9 hectare of commercial and logistics land at Tangerang New Industry City.

Samanea Jakarta Market is considered Phase I of the project and began operation in August 2020. Phase II (tenant warehouses, staff apartments, boutique apartments, etc.) is targeted to open in 2021.

In 2022, the main body of Samanea Indonesia market Phase 2 will be completed, with a floor area of over 300,000 square metres and over 4,000 shops, and is expected to be ready for market in 2023.

== Overview ==
With a total site area of 100,000 m^{2} and a planned gross floor area of 237,000 m^{2}, Jakarta Business City is planned to be developed in two phases.The first phase of the project, which has been opened on a trial basis in 2021 officially, will have a total gross floor area of 14,000 m^{2} and 405 shops.

The second phase of the project, the main body of the business city has a planned gross floor area of 110,000 m^{2}, with over 4,000 shops. At present, the construction of the main body of the second phase has been completed and is expected to be in operation in 2023.

Commercial supporting facilities: To meet customer demand, a number of supporting businesses are planned to be built in Samanea Jakarta market: office buildings, commercial hotels, logistics warehouses, lifestyle malls and other comprehensive facilities.

== Operating hours ==
Samanea Jakarta Market is usually open from 9:00 to 21:00.

== Accessibility ==
Located in Cikupa, Tangerang Regency, Samanea Jakarta Market is 2 minutes' drive from Tangerang-Merak Toll, 42 km from Soekarno-Hatta International Airport, 30 km from Sudirman Central Business District and 18 km from Tangerang railway station.

== Trade Mix ==
At present, the first phase of the Market is occupied by a wide range of industries with rich categories, covering twenty-two major categories such as catering, automotive products (new cars, used cars, new energy, auto and motorcycle parts), industrial electrical, hardware and tools, digital home appliances, clothing, shoes and hats, and daily-use department stores.

== Gallery ==
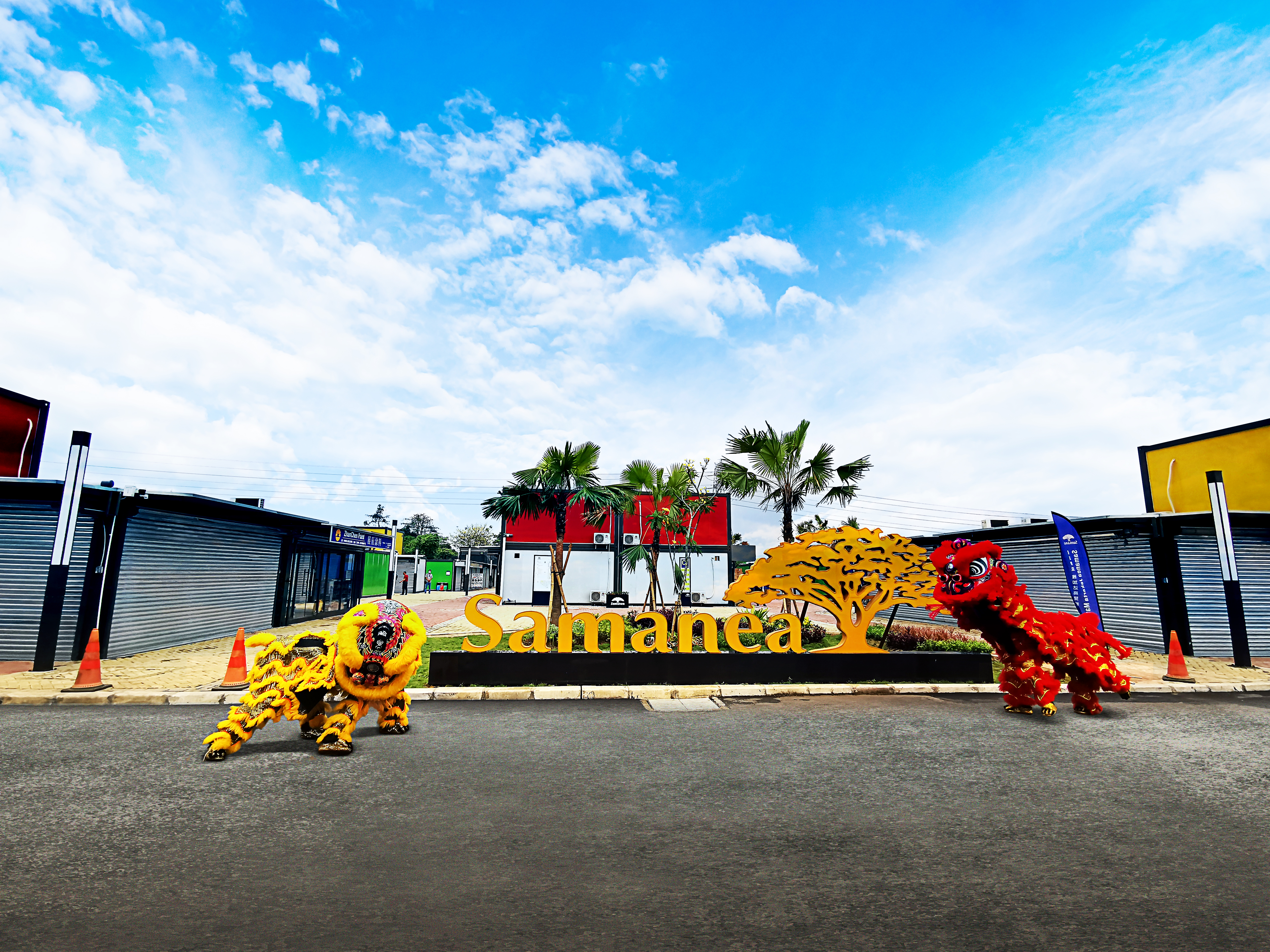
Entrance of Samanea Jakarta Market
