= Tangerang–Merak Toll Road =

Toll road in Indonesia

Coordinates: 06°10′56.84″S 106°47′35.01″E

- Jalan Tol Tangerang–Merak
- Tamer Toll Road
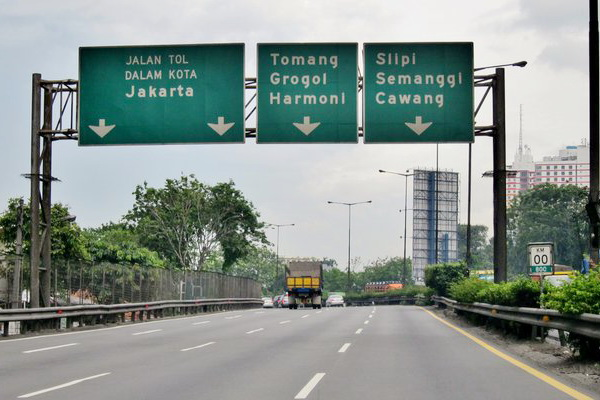

Route information
- Part of AH2
- Maintained by PT Marga Mandalasakti (Astra Tol Nusantara)
- Length: 72 km (45 mi)
- Existed: 1992–present

Major junctions
- East end: AH2 Jakarta–Tangerang Toll Road (Bitung junction)
- Serpong–Balaraja Toll Road; Serang–Panimbang Toll Road
- West end: Port of Merak

Location
- Country: Indonesia
- Major cities: Tangerang Regency; Serang Regency; Serang City; Cilegon

Highway system
- Transport in Indonesia

The Tangerang–Merak Toll Road (shortened to Tamer Toll Road), also known as the Banten Highway, is a controlled-access toll road that connects Tangerang with the Port of Merak in the province of Banten, Indonesia. Being a part of the Jakarta–Merak Toll Road, the toll road passes through Cikupa, Balaraja, Kragilan, Ciujung, Serang, and Cilegon, before ending at Merak.

== Exits ==
Province	Location	km	mi	Exit	Name	Destinations	Notes
Banten	Cikupa, Tangerang Regency	31.63	19.65	Cikupa Toll Gate (Main toll gate/Border between Jakarta-Tangerang and Tangerang-Merak)			
Banten	Cikupa, Tangerang Regency	35.78	22.23	35	Balaraja Timur Toll Gate	Balaraja; Tigaraksa; Cikupa	
Banten	Balaraja, Tangerang Regency	39.11	24.30	39	Balaraja Barat Toll Gate	Balaraja; Tigaraksa	
Banten	Cikande, Serang Regency	52.33	32.52	52	Cikande Toll Gate	Cikande; Cikande Industrial Complex	
Banten	Kragilan, Serang Regency	59.95	37.25	60	Ciujung Toll Gate	Ciujung; Kragilan	
Banten	Ciruas, Serang Regency	64.10	39.83	64	Walantaka Interchange	Serang–Panimbang Toll Road; Rangkasbitung; Pandeglang; Tanjung Lesung	
Banten	Cipocok Jaya, Serang	72.21	44.87	72	Serang Timur Toll Gate	Serang; Old Banten; Pandeglang	
Banten	Taktakan, Serang	77.62	48.23	77	Serang Barat Toll Gate	Serang; Kramatwatu	
Banten	Kramatwatu, Serang Regency	87.36	54.28	87	Cilegon Timur Toll Gate	Cilegon; Bojonegara	
Banten	Purwakarta, Cilegon	95.19	59.15	95	Cilegon Barat Toll Gate	Cilegon; Anyer; Carita; Krakatau Steel	Westbound exit, eastbound entry only
Banten	Grogol, Cilegon	98.48	61.19	98	Merak Toll Gate	Merak	Westernmost toll gate/exit in Java, Western terminus of Toll Route 1
1.000 mi = 1.609 km; 1.000 km = 0.621 mi: Electronic toll collection; Incomplete access; Route transition

== Elevated toll road section ==
To overcome floods of Ciujung River in kilometer 57 to 59 which happened in 2012 and 2013, the operator has planned to elevated the toll road certain section by 2.7 meter height above the existing toll road with prediction cost Rp.300 billion ($25 million) for 2.5 kilometer elevated toll road as Prof. Dr. Ir. Soedijatmo Toll Road (Soekarno–Hatta Toll Road).

== See also ==
- Transport in Indonesia
