= Tigaraksa railway station =

Railway station in Indonesia

R18 Tigaraksa Station Stasiun Tigaraksa
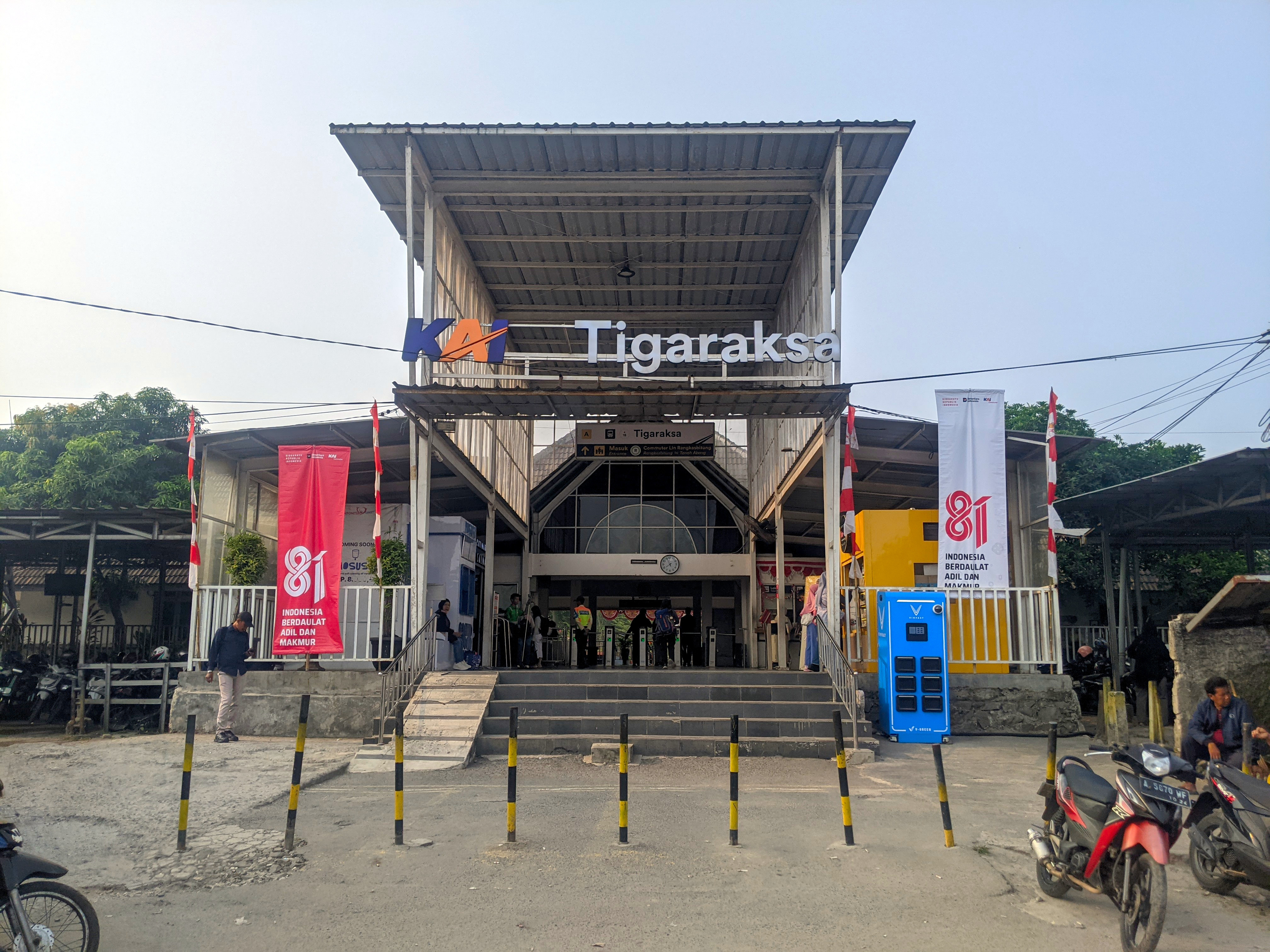
- Front view, 2026

General information
- Location: Cikasungka, Solear, Tangerang Regency; Banten; Indonesia
- Coordinates: 6.328333°S 106.434722°E
- Elevation: +51 m (167 ft)
- Owner: Kereta Api Indonesia
- Operator: KAI Commuter
- Lines: Rangkasbitung Line; Merak–Tanah Abang
- Platforms: 2 island platforms 1 side platform
- Tracks: 4

Construction
- Structure type: Ground
- Parking: Available
- Accessible: Available

Other information
- Station code: TGS
- Classification: Large class type C

History
- Opened: c. July 1996
- Electrified: 2012

Services
Preceding station		Following station
Tenjo towards Tanah Abang	Rangkasbitung Commuter Line	Cikoya towards Rangkasbitung
Location
- Location within Java

Tigaraksa Station (TGS) is a large class type C railway station located in Cikasungka, Solear, Tangerang Regency. The station, which is located at an altitude of +51 meters, is included in the Operation Area I Jakarta of Kerera Api Indonesia and only serves the Rangkasbitung Line of KRL Commuterline system. Despite its name, this station is not located in the Tigaraksa district, but is located in the south of the Tigaraksa district itself.

== History ==
Tigaraksa station was opened sometime around July 1996 to accommodate the nearby Tigaraksa district to the north as the seat of Tangerang Regency. Since 1 April 2013, Tigaraksa Station has served the KRL Commuterline system. But 4 years later, on 1 April 2017, Tigaraksa Station has no longer serves all local train trips operating in the Banten province.

After undergoing trials since 20 January 2021, on 1 February 2021, Tigaraksa Station was determined to be the starting point of departure for KRL Commuterline trains serving the Tanah Abang–Tigaraksa route.

== Station layout ==
Initially, this station only had one railroad line and was a small station. Since the operation of the double track and the extension of the KRL line network as of May 2012, the station has increased its lines to four with lines 2 and 3 being straight tracks and becoming a large station.

This station, since 17 April 2013, has been serving KRL Commuterline to Tanah Abang Station and has been crossed by a double track.

R17 Tigaraksa
G	Main building
P Platform floor	Side platform
P Platform floor	Line 1	← (Cikoya) Rangkasbitung Line to Rangkasbitung and Tanah Abang (Tenjo) →
P Platform floor	Island platform
P Platform floor	Line 2	← (Cikoya) Rangkasbitung Line to Rangkasbitung
P Platform floor	Line 3	Rangkasbitung Line to Tanah Abang (Tenjo) →
P Platform floor	Island platform
P Platform floor	Line 4	Rangkasbitung Line to Tanah Abang (Tenjo) →

== Services ==
The following is a list of train services at the Tigaraksa Station.

- KRL Commuterline
  - Green Line, towards Tanah Abang (Tigaraksa branch)
  - Green Line, towards Tanah Abang and to Rangkasbitung (Rangkasbitung branch)

== Gallery ==
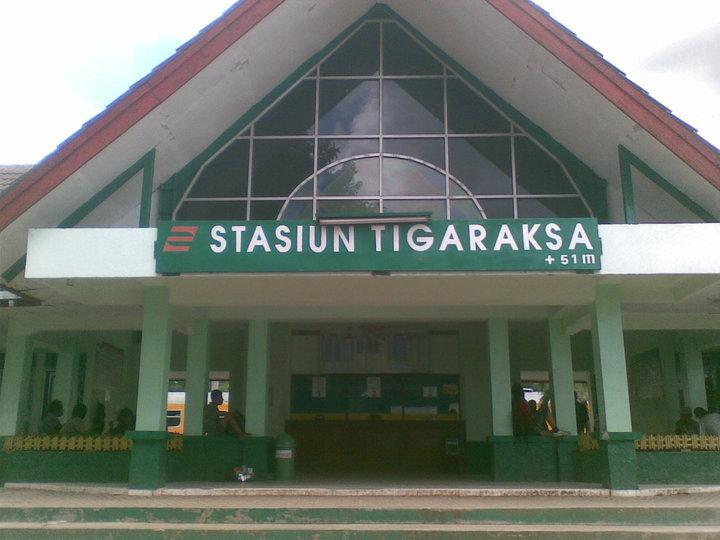
The entrance of the station, prior to renovation (2011)

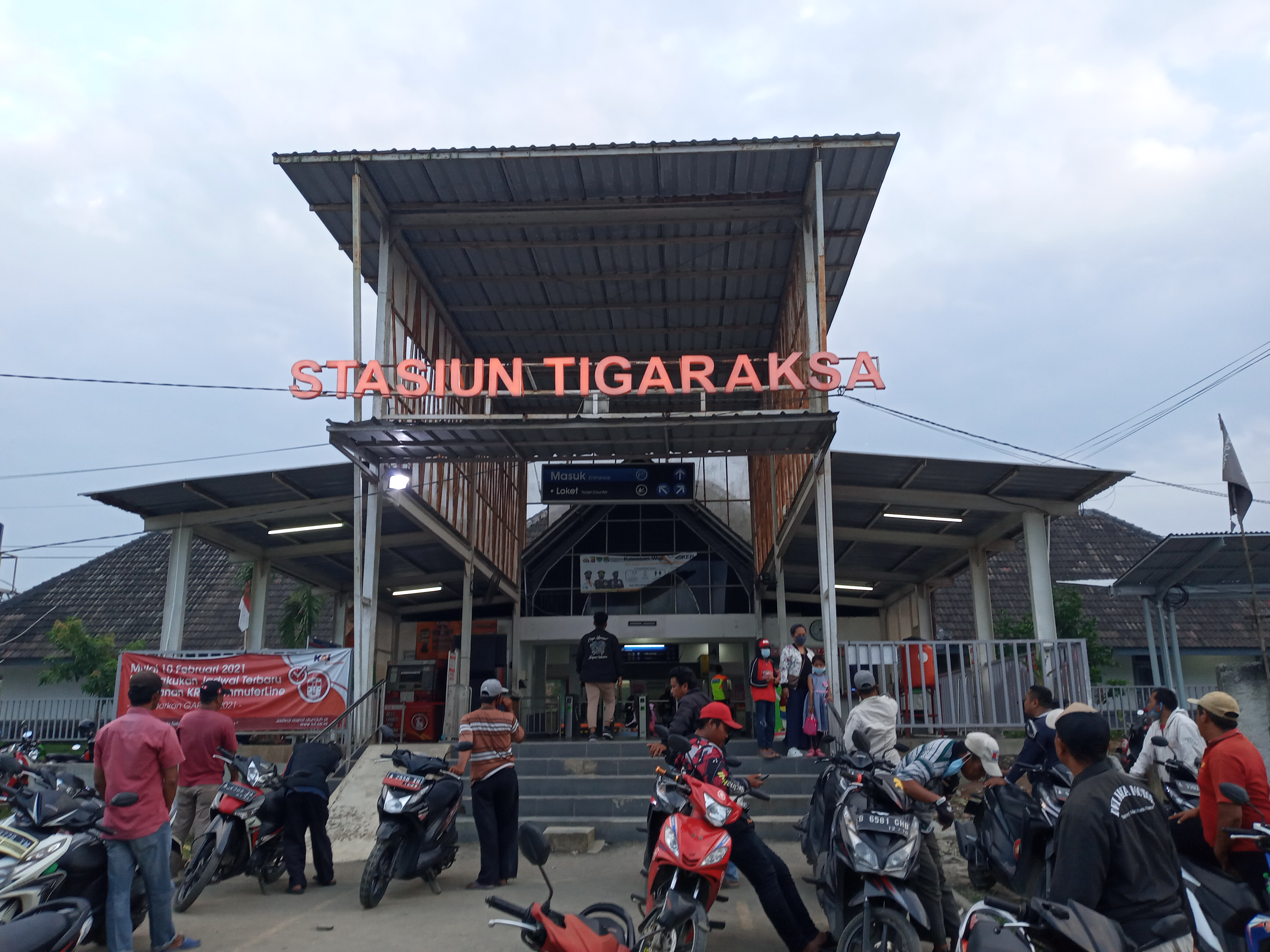
The entrance of the station, prior to "KAI" station name signage rework (2021)

Preceding station	Kereta Api Indonesia	Following station
Cikoya towards Merak	Merak–Tanah Abang	Tenjo towards Tanah Abang
