= Uci Turtusi =

Indonesian islamic scholar (died 2021)

Abuya Kyai Hajji Uci Turtusi
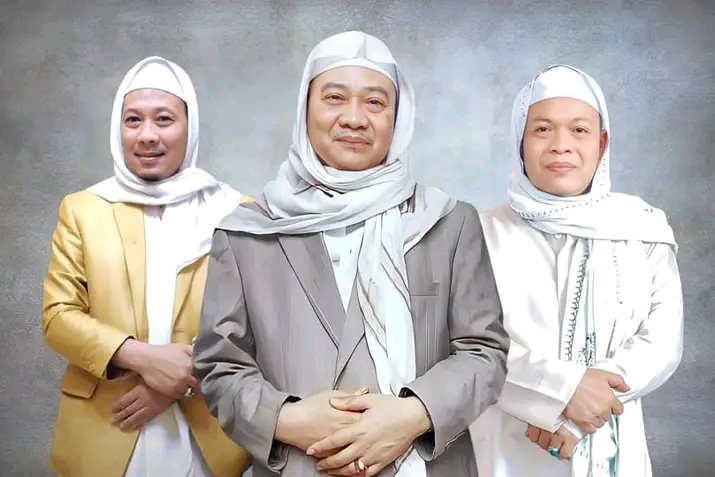
- Abuya Uci Turtusi, Abuya Tohawi Romli, Abuya Iim Imadudin
- Title: Abuya

Personal life
- Born: Uci Turtusi; 1964 Cilongok, Sukamantri, Pasarkemis, Tangerang Regency, Banten
- Died: April 6, 2021 Cilongok, Sukamantri, Pasarkemis, Tangerang Regency, Banten
- Resting place: Grave of Abuya Uci Turtusi
- Home town: Cilongok, Sukamantri, Pasarkemis, Tangerang Regency, Banten
- Spouse: Hj. Lala Sulwiyah
- Children: Hj Tatu; Hj Anis; H Iwan; Hj Wida; H Jami; Hj Ila; Hj Jipah; H Farhan
- Parents: Abuya KH. Ahmad Dimyathi (father); Hj. Nihayah (mother)
- Citizenship: Indonesia
- Era: Modern era
- Region: Cilongok, Sukamantri, Pasarkemis, Tangerang Regency, Banten
- Main interests: Arabic grammar; fiqh; akhlaq; tasawwuf; tafsir; hadith; quran
- Known for: Leader of Pondok Pesantren Al-Istiqlaliyah Cilongok (2001–present)
- Other name: Abuya Uci
- Occupation: ulama; Muslim cleric; preacher; da'i
- Relatives: KH. Zaky El-Yamani (child in law); KH. Asep (child in law); KH. Muhammad Toto (child in law); H. Muhammad Faisal Qurtubi (child in law)
- Website: abuyauci.com

Religious life
- Religion: Islam
- Denomination: Sunni
- Lineage: Abuya KH. Dimyathi; KH. Romli; KH. Khaerun; KH. Raden Cimang; KH. Raden Datasaen; Raden Saif Suradipa; Raden Kabal; Raden Tumenggung Mahmud Yudanegara; Raden Tumenggung Kamil; Raden Aria Yudanegara; Raden Aria Wangsakara; Pangeran Wiraraja; Prabu Geusan Ulun Sumedang; Pangeran Santri; Pangeran Muhammad Pamalekaran; Pangeran Panjunan Abdurohman
- Jurisprudence: Shafi‘i
- Tariqa: Qadiriyya wa Naqshbandiyya
- Creed: Ashʿari

Muslim leader
- Teacher: Abuya Dimyathi Cidahu; KH Yusuf bin Said Caringin; KH Aang Syadzili Cibeureum (and Others)
- Influenced by: Wahidin Halim; Syarif Muhammad ash-Shafiuddin of Banten
- Influenced: Abdul Qadir Gilani; Muhammad Dimyathi al-Bantani; Ahmad Muhtadi Dimyathi; Muhammad Luthfi bin Yahya; Abdurrahman Wahid

Abuya, KH. Uci Turtusi bin Dimyati, better known as Abuya Uci (died April 6, 2021), was an influential Indonesian Muslim cleric and preacher from Banten. Uci was the leader of the Pondok Pesantren Salafiyah Al-Istiqlaliyah Cilongok (Al-Istiqlaliyah Cilongok Islamic Boarding School or Pesantren Cilongok) who succeeded his father, Abuya Dimyati bin Romli, who died in early 2001. The Pesantren was founded in 1957 by Abuya Dimyati, an influential cleric in the Tangerang Regency.

Uci was known as a cleric who was close to former Indonesian President Abdurrahman Wahid (Gus Dur), he often mentioned Gus Dur's name in each of his religious lectures when discussing the essence of Islam and often told some of his privileges as a Muslim cleric who became president. In addition, Uci is also known to be close to another influential Indonesian Muslim cleric such as Habib Muhammad Luthfi bin Yahya.

Uci was a spiritual teacher for incumbent Banten governor, Wahidin Halim. He was one of the figures who supported Wahidin Halim and Andika Hazrumy to be the governor and deputy governor of Banten for the 2017–2022 period in 2017 Banten gubernatorial election.
