= Agus Padmanagara =

Raden Tumenggung Agus Padmanagara
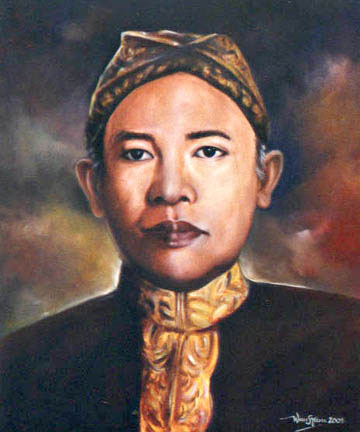

Regent of Garut
- In office 1948 – 31 December 1949
- Wali Negara: Wiranatakusumah
- Preceded by: Kalih Wiramihardja
- Succeeded by: Kartahudaya

Regent of Tangerang
- In office 1944 – 18 October 1945
- Preceded by: Atik Soeardi
- Succeeded by: Achmad Chaerun

Personal details
- Born: 4 September 1896 Rancaekek, Dutch East Indies
- Died: 16 January 1963 (aged 66)
- Profession: Politician; Bureaucrat

Agus Padmanagara (4 September 1896 – 16 January 1963), often spelled Agus Padmanegara, was a politician and bureaucrat who served as Regent of Tangerang (1944–1945) and Regent of Garut (1948–1949).

== Early life and education ==
Agus was born in Rancaekek on 4 September 1896. He completed his education at ELS and OSVIA, graduating on 19 June 1917.

== Career ==
After graduating from OSVIA, Agus began his career as a native administrative official trainee (CIBA) at the district chief's office in Bandung for two years (1917–1919). He was then appointed as a police clerk at the Bandung Police Office from 1919 to 1922.

Agus served as Assistant District Chief of Pacet from 1922 to 1926. During his tenure, he was appointed as Commissioner of the Poerwa Tani in December 1923. He was subsequently promoted to First-Class Assistant Wedana. From 1927 to 1928, he served as Assistant Wedana in Cikembar and Cisaat. On 13 September 1930, he became Deputy Secretary of Karawang Regency, based in Purwakarta. Prior to that, he had served as a Member of the Sukabumi Regency Council.

Agus was appointed as District Chief of Cikalongwetan on 24 November 1932. During his tenure, he was elected as a Member of the Bandung Regency Council in August 1933. On 6 February 1935, he became District Chief of Ujungberung. While serving in this position, he was also a Member of the Bandung Regency Council and was regarded as one of the best district chiefs in Priangan. He was appointed as District Chief of Cibarusa on 6 April 1937. In this role, he was involved in operations to suppress banditry that had been terrorizing residents and also served as a member of the Bogor Regency Council. He later served as District Chief of Tasikmalaya starting on 2 August 1939. On 21 November 1940, he was appointed as Patih of Karawang. He continued to serve in this position after the Japanese occupation. In 1943, he received the rank of Tihoo Santoo Gyooseikan.

=== Regent of Tangerang ===
In 1944, Agus was appointed Regent of Tangerang, replacing Atik Soeardi. As Regent of Tangerang, he felt uncertain about what decision to take upon hearing news of the proclamation of independence. In response to his indecision, unrest emerged in Tangerang, prompting a group of Tan Malaka’s followers to plan an action to remove Agus from his position as Regent of Tangerang.

In response to the unrest in Tangerang, Agus ordered the strongmen from Batuceper and Rawa Bokor, led by Haji Taung, to guard his house. His decision to recruit these strongmen for security drew negative reactions from prominent figures in Tangerang. Subsequently, one of Tangerang’s notable figures, Sumo Atmojo, held a meeting on 16 October 1945 at his residence, attended by influential local leaders, to discuss Agus’s recruitment of strongmen. They agreed that the Regent of Tangerang should be replaced.

Two days later, Achmad Chaerun and his supporters marched from Curug to Agus’s residence to compel him to sign a letter of resignation as regent. However, upon arriving, they did not find Agus, and Achmad Chaerun decided to seize power by force, resulting in Agus being removed from his position as Regent of Tangerang.

=== Regent of Garut and late career ===
The Recomba government appointed Agus as Regent of Garut on 5 December 1947. He only assumed office as Regent of Garut in 1948. In March 1948, he was rumored to be appointed as Secretary-General for Economic Affairs of Pasundan. He resigned from his position as Regent of Garut on 31 December 1949 and was succeeded by Kartahudaya. Afterward, he was assigned to the Ministry of Internal Affairs of Pasundan.

Agus was appointed Chairman of the Private Land Department of the West Java Regional Government in January 1951. He attended the West Java Planters’ Meeting on 22 October 1955 as a representative of the governor and the resident. In July 1956, he decided to resign from his position as regent under the authority of the Bandung Residency Office due to retirement, and he was succeeded by Chr. A. Lekatompessy.

== Death and personal life ==
Agus died on 16 January 1963 and was buried in a cemetery located on Jl. Karang Anyar, Bandung. One of his children, Salmon Padmanagara, was an agronomist.

== Awards ==
- Ster voor Trouw en Verdienste - Great Silver Star, 31 December 1938.

== Bibliography ==
- Handayani, Yeni; Kurni, Ahmad Deden Jalilul (2022). "AKSI KEKERASAN PASUKAN UBEL-UBEL DI TANGERANG TAHUN 1945–1946". WIKSA:Prosiding Pendidikan Sejarah. 1 (1).
- Government of Dutch East Indies (1937). Regerings-almanak voor Nederlandsch-Indië, Deel: 2, 1937. Batavia: Landsdrukkerij.
- Government of Dutch East Indies (1939). Regerings-almanak voor Nederlandsch-Indië, 1939.Tweede gedeelte Kalender en personalia. Batavia: Landsdrukkerij.
- Kamilah, Holisotul (2019). Peran KH. Ahmad Khaerun Pada Masa Revolusi di Tangerang Tahun 1945-1946 (Sarjana thesis). Universitas Islam Negeri Sultan Maulana Hasanuddin.
