= Jambe =

Jambe may refer to:

- Jambe, Indonesia
- Jambe, Kenya
