= Sindang Jaya =

- Village and district
- Interactive map of Sindang Jaya
- Country: Indonesia
- Province: Banten
- Regency: Tangerang Regency
- Established: 29 December 2006

Area
  - Total: 41.39 km^{2} (15.98 sq mi)

Population (mid 2024 estimate)
  - Total: 100,376
  - Density: 2,425/km^{2} (6,281/sq mi)

Sindang Jaya is a village (desa) and an administrative district (kecamatan) located in the Tangerang Regency of Banten Province on Java, Indonesia. The district covers an area of 41.39 km^{2}, and had a population of 77,025 at the 2010 Census and 91,170 at the 2020 Census; the official estimate as of mid-2024 was 100,376 (comprising 51,082 males and 49,294 females). The district centre is located in the village of Sindang Asih.

== History ==
Sindang Jaya District was previously part of the areas of Pasarkemis and Rajeg Districts before it was split off from the western and southern parts respectively of those districts on 29 December 2006.

== Communities ==
Sindang Jaya District is sub-divided into seven rural villages (desa), all sharing the postcode of 15561. These are listed below with their areas and their officially-estimated populations as of mid-2024.

Kode Wilayah	Name of kelurahan or desa	Area in km^{2}	Population mid 2024 estimate
36.03.29.2002	Wanakerta	8.25	22,429
36.03.29.2003	Sukaharja	5.85	16,893
36.03.29.2005	Sindang Panon	5.16	17,176
36.03.29.2001	Sindang Jaya (village)	5.40	10,294
36.03.29.2004	Sindang Asih	5.31	12,085
36.03.29.2006	Sindang Sono	8.06	13,986
36.03.29.2007	Badak Anom	3.37	7,513
36.03.29	Totals	41.39	100,376
