= Sukamulya =

- Village and district
- Interactive map of Sukamulya
- Country: Indonesia
- Province: Banten
- Regency: Tangerang Regency
- Established: 29 December 2006

Area
  - Total: 25.88 km^{2} (9.99 sq mi)

Population (mid 2024 estimate)
  - Total: 92,636
  - Density: 3,579/km^{2} (9,271/sq mi)

Sukamulya is a village and an administrative district (kecamatan) located in the Tangerang Regency of Banten Province on Java, Indonesia.

Sukamulya District is composed of what were previously parts of Jayanti and Balaraja Districts before it was split off from the former northwestern and northeastern parts of those districts on 29 December 2006.

The district covers a land area of 25.88 km^{2}, and had a population of 59,027 at the 2010 Census and 69,275 at the 2020 Census; the official estimate as of mid-2024 was 92,636 (comprising 46,900 males and 45,736 females). The district administrative centre is in the village of Sukamulya, and the district is sub-divided into eight villages (desa), all sharing the postcode of 15612, and listed below with their areas and their officially-estimated populations as of mid-2024.

Kode Wilayah	Name of Desa	Area in km^{2}	Pop'n mid 2024 estimate
36.03.27.2008	Kubang	3.57	7,420
36.03.27.2005	Parahu	3.73	14,686
36.03.27.2002	Sukamulya (village)	3.46	25,620
36.03.27.2003	Kali Asin	2.51	10,461
36.03.27.2006	Merak	2.39	9,319
36.03.27.2007	Bunar	3.85	11,503
36.03.27.2001	Benda	2.84	7,525
36.03.27.2004	Buni Ayu	3.54	6,102
36.03.27	Totals	25.88	92,636
