= Solear =

- Town and district
- Interactive map of Solear
- Coordinates: 6°18′10″S 106°24′50″E
- Country: Indonesia
- Province: Banten
- Regency: Tangerang Regency
- Established: 29 December 2006

Area
  - Total: 34.07 km^{2} (13.15 sq mi)

Population (mid 2024 estimate)
  - Total: 109,317
  - Density: 3,209/km^{2} (8,310/sq mi)

Solear is a town and an administrative district (kecamatan) located in the Tangerang Regency of Banten Province on Java, Indonesia. The district covers a land area of 34.07 km^{2}, and had a population of 73,888 at the 2010 Census and 95,521 at the 2020 Census; the official estimate as of mid-2024 was 109,317 (comprising 56,202 males and 53,115 females). The administrative centre is at the town of Solear.

== History ==
Solear was previously part of Cisoka district before it was split off from the southern part of the district in 2006.

== Villages ==
Solear District is sub-divided into seven villages (desa), all sharing the postcode of 15731, listed below with their areas and their officially-estimated populations as of mid-2024.

| Kode Wilayah | Name of desa | Area in km^{2} | Population mid 2024 estimate |
|---|---|---|---|
| 36.03.31.2001 | Solear (town) | 5.49 | 13,057 |
| 36.03.31.2002 | Cikuya | 7.83 | 17,014 |
| 36.03.31.2003 | Cikasungka | 7.42 | 25,527 |
| 36.03.31.2004 | Cireundeu | 1.70 | 5,883 |
| 36.03.31.2005 | Cikareo | 3.00 | 6,235 |
| 36.03.31.2006 | Pasanggrahan | 4.47 | 26,404 |
| 36.03.31.2007 | Munjul | 4.16 | 15,197 |
| 36.03.31 | Totals | 34.07 | 109,317 |

== Transportation ==
Cikoya and Tigaraksa railway station are the only railway stations in Solear serving the Rangkasbitung Line, with Tigaraksa being a terminal station for some commuter train trips. Although named the Tigaraksa railway station, the station is located in the southeast of Solear instead of Tigaraksa. An extension of Tigaraksa station located near the border of Solear and Tenjo named Tigaraksa Pomodoro railway station is currently being planned.
