= Curug =

Curug may refer to:

- Curug, Serang, a village in Serang, Banten, Indonesia
- Curug, Tangerang, a subdistrict of Tangerang Regency, Banten, Indonesia
- Čurug, a village near Žabalj, South Bačka District, Serbia
