= Kelapa Dua =

- Town and district
- Interactive map of Kelapa Dua
- Country: Indonesia
- Province: Banten
- Regency: Tangerang Regency
- Established: 29 December 2006

Area
  - Total: 26.22 km^{2} (10.12 sq mi)

Population (mid 2024 estimate)
  - Total: 174,127
  - Density: 6,641/km^{2} (17,200/sq mi)

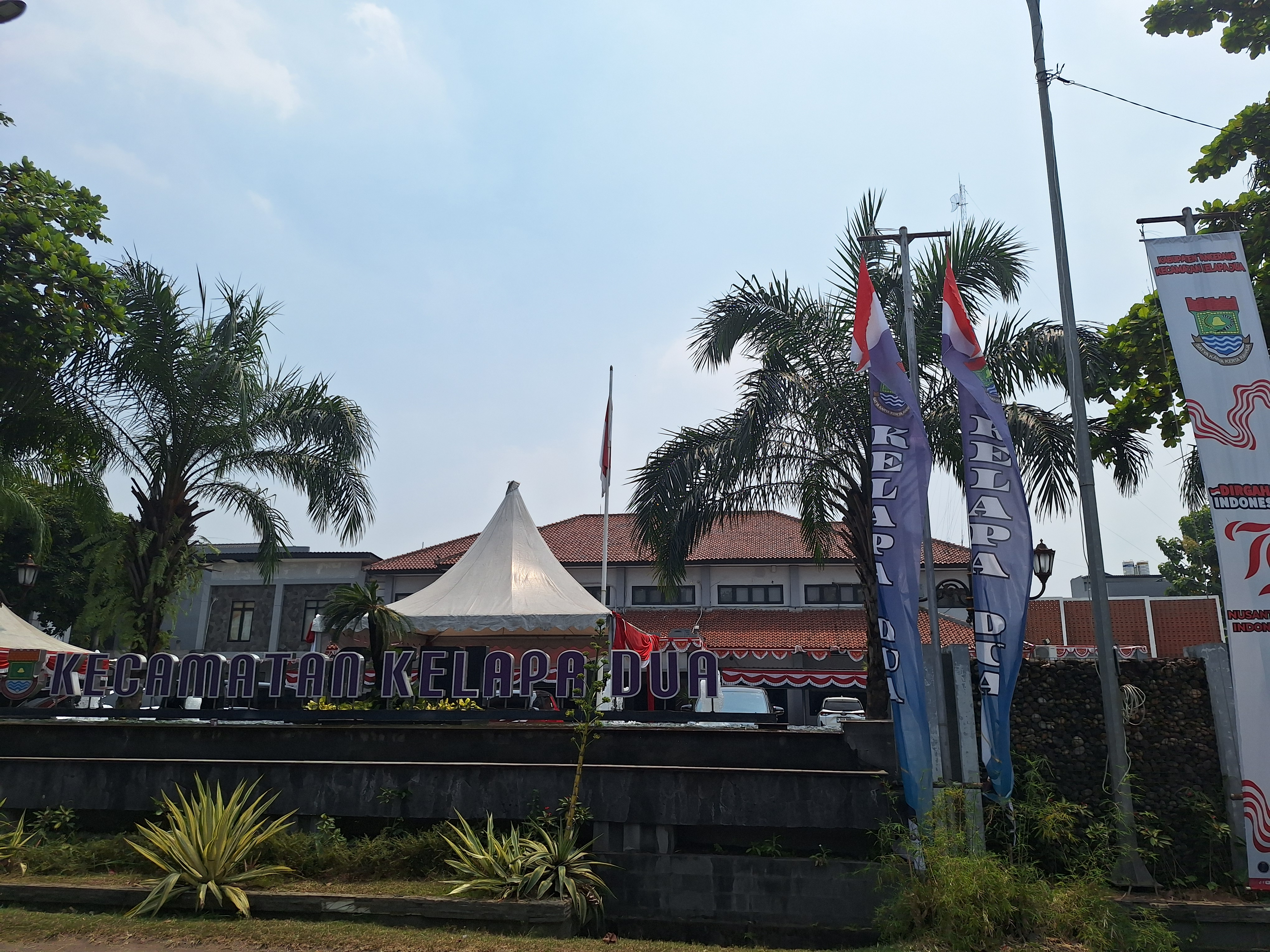
Kelapa Dua District Office Building on August 21, 2024.

Kelapa Dua is a town and an administrative district (kecamatan) located in the Tangerang Regency of Banten Province on Java, Indonesia. Located immediately south of the city of Tangerang, the district covers an area of 26.22 km^{2} and had a population of 178,035 at the 2010 Census and 169,340 at the 2020 Census; the official estimate as of mid-2024 was 174,127 (comprising 86,751 males and 87,376 females). The towns of Becongan, Becongan Indah, Kelapa Dua and Pakulonan Barat comprise the northern part of the district, while Curug Sangereng lies to the southeast (surrounded on three sides by Pagedangan District, of which it was formerly a part) and Bojong Nangka lies to the southwest.

== History ==
Kepala Dua District was previously part of the areas of Curug, Legok and Pagedangan Districts before it was split off from the eastern, northeastern and northern parts of these respective districts on 29 December 2006.

== Communities ==
Kelapa Dua District is sub-divided into five urban communities (kelurahan) - Kelapa Dua, Bencongan, Bencongan Indah, Bojong Nangka and Pakulonan Barat - and one village (desa) - Curug Sangereng, the latter being the location of the district administrative centre - all six sharing the postcode of 15811. These are listed below with their areas and their officially-estimated populations as of mid-2024.

| Kode Wilayah | Name of kelurahan or desa | Area in km^{2} | Population mid 2024 estimate |
|---|---|---|---|
| 36.03.28.1005 | Bojong Nangka | 6.46 | 52,971 |
| 36.03.28.2006 | Curug Sangereng | 4.60 | 16,907 |
| 36.03.28.1004 | Pakulonan Barat | 3.44 | 21,586 |
| 36.03.28.1001 | Kelapa Dua (town) | 5.31 | 30,623 |
| 36.03.28.1003 | Bencongan Indah | 4.28 | 11,810 |
| 36.03.28.1002 | Bencongan | 2.12 | 40,230 |
| 36.03.28 | Totals | 26.22 | 174,127 |

== Diving ==
Located on Kakaban Island, the Kelapa Dua dive site features a steep underwater wall with coral formations and sea fans. It is known for early-morning sightings of resident thresher sharks utilizing cleaning stations. While deeper areas require advanced certifications, sections up to 18 meters are accessible to Open Water divers.
