= Tangerang (disambiguation) =

Tangerang may refer to:

- Tangerang City, a city in Banten
- Tangerang Regency, a regency in Banten
- South Tangerang, a city which formerly included to Tangerang Regency
