= Panongan =

- Town and district
- Interactive map of Panongan
- Country: Indonesia
- Province: Banten
- Regency: Tangerang Regency
- Established: 26 May 1999

Area
  - Total: 35.61 km^{2} (13.75 sq mi)

Population (mid 2024 estimate)
  - Total: 138,524
  - Density: 3,890/km^{2} (10,080/sq mi)

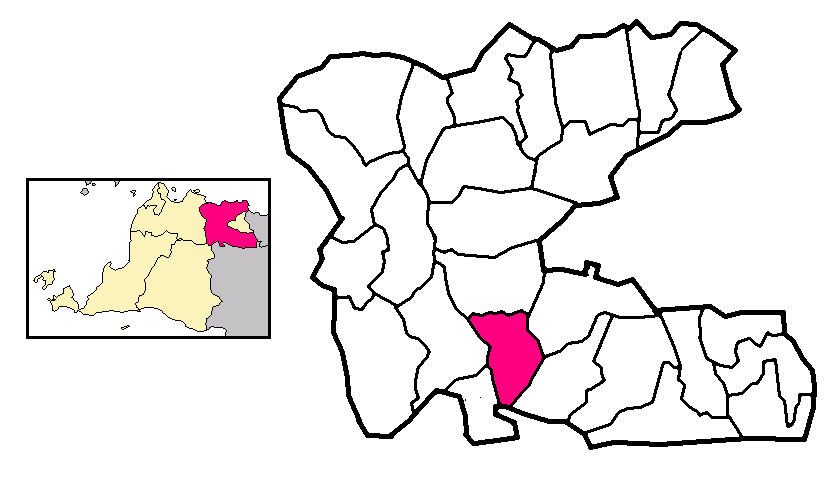
Map image showing Panongan highlighted in red.

Panongan is a town and an administrative district (kecamatan) located in the Tangerang Regency of Banten Province on Java, Indonesia. The district covers an area of 35.61 km^{2}, and had a population of 96,383 at the 2010 Census and 130,489 at the 2020 Census; the official estimate as of mid-2024 was 138,524 (comprising 70,553 males and 67,971 females). The district centre is at Panongan town.

== History ==
Panongan was previously part of Cikupa District before it was split off from the southern part of that district in 1999.

== Communities ==
Panongan District is sub-divided into the town (kelurahan) of Mekar Bakti and seven rural villages (desa), all sharing the postcode of 15711. These are listed below with their areas and their officially-estimated populations as of mid-2024.

Kode Wilayah	Name of kelurahan or desa	Area in km^{2}	Population mid 2024 estimate
36.03.19.2001	Ranca Iyuh	5.91	14,215
36.03.19.2006	Mekar Jaya	2.79	10,618
36.03.19.2004	Ranca Kalapa	4.71	9,952
36.03.19.2008	Panongan (town)	4.52	19,722
36.03.19.2005	Serdang Kulon	2.98	12,751
36.03.19.2007	Ciakar	7.59	34,549
36.03.19.1002	Mekar Bakti	3.33	24,121
36.03.19.2003	Peusar	3.78	12,596
36.03.19	Totals	35.61	138,524
