= Gunungkaler =

- Village and district
- Interactive map of Gunungkaler
- Country: Indonesia
- Province: Banten
- Regency: Tangerang Regency
- Established: 29 December 2006

Area
  - Total: 32.77 km^{2} (12.65 sq mi)

Population (mid 2024 estimate)
  - Total: 58,465
  - Density: 1,784/km^{2} (4,621/sq mi)

Gunungkaler (or Gunung Kaler) is a village (desa) and an administrative district (kecamatan) located in the Tangerang Regency of Banten Province on Java, Indonesia. The district covers a land area of 32.77 km^{2}, and had a population of 47,699 at the 2010 Census and 51,102 at the 2020 Census; the official estimate as of mid-2024 was 58,465 (comprising 29,570 males and 28,895 females). The administrative centre is at the village of Gunung Kaler.

Gunung Kaler District was previously part of Kresek District before it was split off from the northwestern part of that district on 29 December 2006.

The district is sub-divided into nine villages (desa), all sharing the postcode of 15620, and listed below with their areas and their officially-estimated populations as of mid-2024.

Kode Wilayah	Name of Desa	Area in km^{2}	Pop'n mid 2024 estimate
36.03.32.2008	Kanda Wati	3.75	5,831
36.03.32.2009	Cibetok	3.61	5,702
36.03.32.2007	Tamiang	5.24	9,229
36.03.32.2005	Cipaeh	4.82	5,338
36.03.32.2004	Kedung	3.35	5,075
36.03.32.2006	Onyam	3.36	7,376
36.03.32.2001	Gunung Kaler (village)	3.39	6,252
36.03.32.2002	Sidoko	2.60	6,376
36.03.32.2003	Ranca Gede	2.65	7,286
36.03.32	Totals	32.77	58,465
