= Jatiuwung =

Jatiuwung (Kecamatan Jatiuwung)
- District
- Interactive map of Jatiuwung
- Country: Indonesia
- Province: Banten
- Municipality: Tangerang City

Area
  - Total: 14.41 km^{2} (5.56 sq mi)

Population (mid 2023 estimate)
  - Total: 107,510
  - Density: 7,461/km^{2} (19,320/sq mi)

Jatiuwung (or Jati Uwung) is an administrative district (kecamatan) of Tangerang City, in Banten Province of Indonesia, on the island of Java. It is the most westerly district of the city, and is surrounded by Tangerang Regency on its north, west and south sides. It covers an area of 14.41 km^{2}, and had a population of 120,216 at the 2010 Census and 102,053 at the 2020 Census; the official estimate as at mid 2023 was 107,510.

== Communities ==
Jatiuwung District is sub-divided into six urban communities (kelurahan), listed below with their areas and their officially-estimated populations as at mid 2022, together with their postcodes.

Kode Wilayah	Name of kelurahan	Area in km^{2}	Population mid 2022 estimate	Post code
36.71.02.1001	Kroncong	1.93	18,911	15134
36.71.02.1002	Jatake	1.40	14,968	15136
36.71.02.1003	Pasir Jaya	5.30	15,730	15135
36.71.02.1004	Gandasari	2.90	23,305	15137
36.71.02.1005	Manis Jaya	1.60	15,145	15136
36.71.02.1006	Alam Jaya	1.44	19,307	15133
36.71.02	Totals	14.57	107,366 ^{(a)}	

Notes: (a) comprising 54,996 males and 52,370 females.
