= Kemiri, Tangerang =

Kemiri
- Village and district
- Interactive map of Kemiri
- Country: Indonesia
- Province: Banten
- Regency: Tangerang Regency
- Established: 29 November 2000

Area
  - Total: 33.45 km^{2} (12.92 sq mi)

Population (mid 2024 estimate)
  - Total: 53,259
  - Density: 1,592/km^{2} (4,124/sq mi)

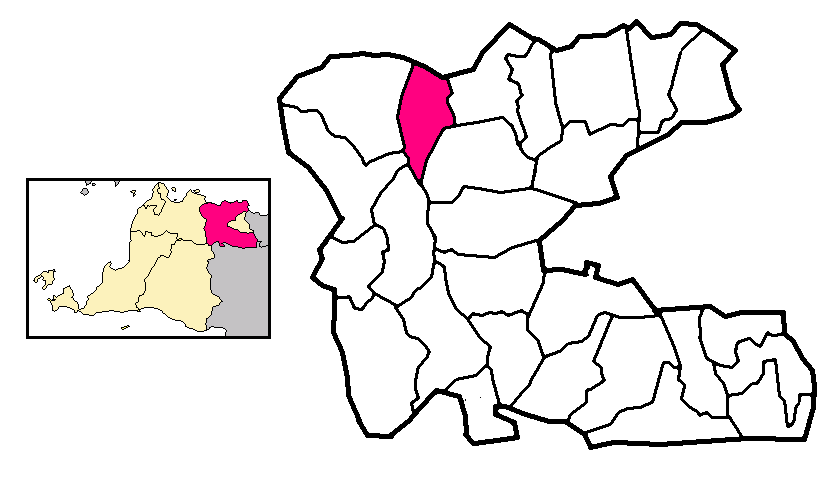
Location of Kemiri

Kemiri is a village (desa) and an administrative district (kecamatan) located in the Tangerang Regency of Banten Province on Java, Indonesia (not to be confused with the district of the same name in Purworejo Regency). The district covers a land area of 33.45 km^{2}, and had a population of 40,605 at the 2010 Census and 48,061 at the 2020 Census; the official estimate as of mid-2024 was 53,259 (comprising 27,160 males and 26,099 females). The administrative centre is the village of Kemiri.

== History ==
Kemiri District was previously part of Mauk District before it was split off from the western part of that district on 29 November 2000.

== Communities ==
Kemiri District is sub-divided into seven rural villages (desa), all sharing the postcode of 15530. These are listed below with their areas and their officially-estimated populations as of mid-2024.

Kode Wilayah	Name of desa	Area in km^{2}	Population mid 2024 estimate
36.03.09.2007	Legok Sukamaju	2.90	5,039
36.03.09.2005	Rancah Labuh	2.00	8,047
36.03.09.2004	Kemiri (village)	4.83	11,797
36.03.09.2006	Kelebet	5.88	11,524
36.03.09.2001	Patra Manggala	5.70	4,816
36.03.09.2002	Karang Anyar	4.35	4,808
36.03.09.2003	Lontar	7.78	7,228
36.03.09	Totals	33.45	53,259
