= Mekarbaru =

Mekar Baru
- Village and district
- Interactive map of Mekar Baru
- Country: Indonesia
- Province: Banten
- Regency: Tangerang Regency

Area
  - Total: 25.78 km^{2} (9.95 sq mi)

Population (mid 2024 estimate)
  - Total: 46,166
  - Density: 1,791/km^{2} (4,638/sq mi)

Mekarbaru (or "Mekar Baru") is a village (desa) and an administrative district (kecamatan) located in the Tangerang Regency of Banten Province on Java, Indonesia.

Mekar Baru District was previously part of Kronjo District before it was split off from the western part of that district in 2006.

The district covers a land area of 25.78 km^{2}, and had a population of 35,417 at the 2010 Census and 41,329 at the 2020 Census; the official estimate as of mid-2024 was 46,166 (comprising 23,397 males and 22,769 females). The administrative centre of the district is at the village of Mekarbaru, and the district is sub-divided into eight villages (desa), all sharing the postcode of 15551. They are listed below with their areas and their officially-estimated populations as of mid-2024.

Kode Wilayah	Name of Desa	Area in km^{2}	Pop'n mid 2024 estimate
36.03.33.2008	Ganda Ria	2.13	6,390
36.03.33.2007	Kosambi Dalam	3.64	8,771
36.03.33.2005	Klutuk	1.57	3,610
36.03.33.2001	Mekar Baru (village)	2.36	4,995
36.03.33.2004	Waliwis	2.54	4,851
36.03.33.2003	Cijeruk	4.62	6,253
36.03.33.2002	Kedaung	3.22	4,254
36.03.33.2006	Jenggot	5.70	7,042
36.03.33	Totals	25.78	46,166
