= Sukadiri =

- Village and District
- Interactive map of Sukadiri
- Country: Indonesia
- Province: Banten
- Regency: Tangerang Regency
- Established: 29 November 2000

Area
  - Total: 24.99 km^{2} (9.65 sq mi)

Population (mid 2024 estimate)
  - Total: 69,234
  - Density: 2,770/km^{2} (7,175/sq mi)

Sukadiri is a village (desa) and an administrative district (kecamatan) located in the Tangerang Regency of Banten Province on Java, Indonesia. It covers an area of 24.98 km^{2} and had a population of 53,100 at the 2010 Census and 63,489 at the 2020 Census; the official estimate as of mid-2024 was 69,234 (comprising 35,394 males and 33,840 females).

== History ==
Sukadiri District was previously part of Mauk District before it was split off from the eastern part of that district on 29 November 2000.

== Communities ==
Sukadiri District is sub-divided into eight villages (desa), all sharing the postcode of 15532, among which is the administrative centre of Rawa Kidang; this formed part of the particuliere landerij (or private domain) of Tan Eng Goan, 1st Majoor der Chinezen of Batavia.

Kode Wilayah	Name of desa	Area in km^{2}	Pop'n mid 2024 estimate
36.03.10.2002	Buaran Jati	2.16	8,837
36.03.10.2008	Gintung	4.13	11,289
36.03.10.2006	Kosambi	2.03	9,877
36.03.10.2007	Mekar Kondang	2.70	6,245
36.03.10.2004	Pekayon	4.92	12,074
36.03.10.2001	Sukadiri (village)	3.26	6,431
36.03.10.2003	Rawa Kidang	2.90	6,320
36.03.10.2005	Karang Serang	2.88	8,161
36.03.10	Totals	24.99	69,234
