= Jayanti, Indonesia =

Jayanti
- Village and district
- Interactive map of Jayanti
- Country: Indonesia
- Province: Banten
- Regency: Tangerang Regency
- Established: 29 November 2000

Area
  - Total: 24.88 km^{2} (9.61 sq mi)

Population (mid 2024 estimate)
  - Total: 73,039
  - Density: 2,936/km^{2} (7,603/sq mi)

Jayanti is a village and an administrative district (kecamatan) located in the Tangerang Regency of Banten Province on Java, Indonesia.

Jayanti District was previously part of Balaraja District before it was split off from the western part of that district on 29 November 2000.

The district covers a land area of 24.88 km^{2}, and had a population of 63,494 at the 2010 Census and 65,545 at the 2020 Census; the official estimate as of mid-2024 was 73,039 (comprising 37,244 males and 35,795 females). The district administrative centre is at Cikande, and the district is sub-divided into eight villages (all classed as desa), all sharing the postcode of 15611, and listed below with their areas and their officially-estimated populations as of mid-2024.

Kode Wilayah	Name of Desa	Area in km^{2}	Pop'n mid 2024 estimate
36.03.02.2006	Jayanti (village)	2.90	11,930
36.03.02.2004	Pasir Muncang	4.25	9,896
36.03.02.2005	Sumur Bandung	3.22	9,690
36.03.02.2008	Cikande	3.35	13,301
36.03.02.2009	Pasir Gintung	2.08	5,761
36.03.02.2001	Pangkat	2.34	6,689
36.03.02.2007	Dang Deur	3.34	8,338
36.03.02.2002	Pabuaran	3.40	7,434
36.03.02	Totals	24.88	73,039
