= East Sepatan =

East Sepatan Sepatan Timur
- Town and district
- Interactive map of East Sepatan
- Country: Indonesia
- Province: Banten
- Regency: Tangerang Regency
- Established: 29 December 2006

Area
  - Total: 19.66 km^{2} (7.59 sq mi)

Population (mid 2024 estimate)
  - Total: 111,034
  - Density: 5,648/km^{2} (14,630/sq mi)

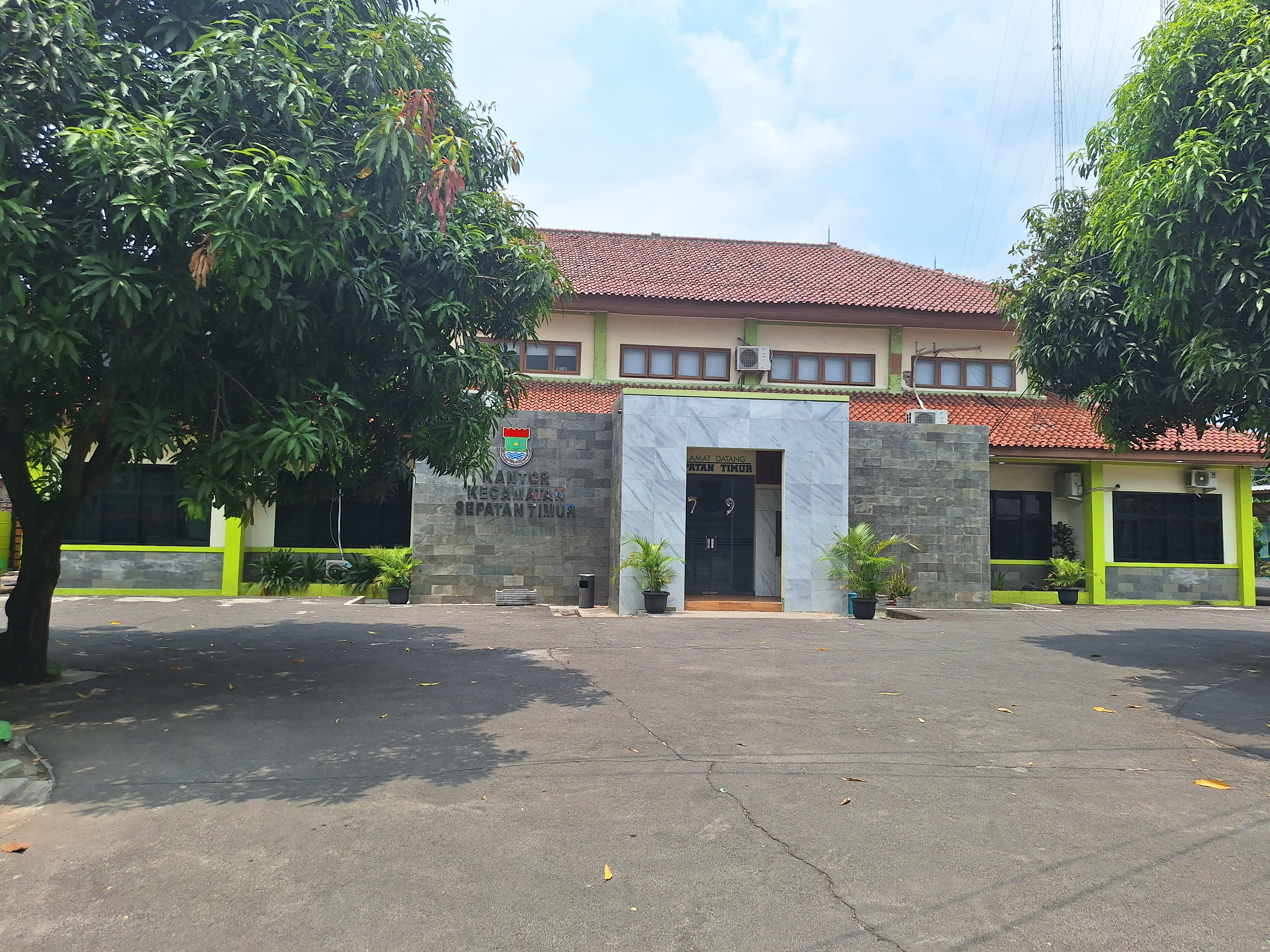
East Sepatan District Office Building, 2024.

East Sepatan (Indonesian: Sepatan Timur) is an administrative district (kecamatan) located in the Tangerang Regency of Banten Province on Java, Indonesia. The district was created in 2006 from the former eastern part of Sepatan District. It covers an area of 19.66 km^{2} and had a population of 81,667 at the 2010 Census and 105,578 at the 2020 Census; the official estimate as at mid 2024 was 111,034 (comprising 57,292 males and 53,742 females).

== Communities ==
The administrative centre is situated at Kedaung Barat, and the district is subdivided into eight desa, all sharing the postcode of 15521, and listed below as follows:

Kode Wilayah	Name of desa	Area in km^{2}	Pop'n mid 2024 estimate
36.03.30.2001	West Kedaung (Kedaung Barat)	2.75	13,236
36.03.30.2002	Lebak Wangi	4.97	30,295
36.03.30.2003	Jati Mulya	1.45	10,416
36.03.30.2004	Sangiang	2.31	10,221
36.03.30.2005	Gempol Sari	3.04	16,838
36.03.30.2006	Kampung Kelor	2.34	10,335
36.03.30.2007	Pondok Kelor	1.36	9,202
36.03.30.2008	Tanah Merah	1.44	10,491
36.03.30	Totals	19.66	111,034
