= Periuk =

- Town and district
- Interactive map of Periuk
- Country: Indonesia
- Province: Banten
- Municipality: Tangerang City

Area
  - Total: 9.54 km^{2} (3.68 sq mi)

Population (mid 2023 estimate)
  - Total: 144,640
  - Density: 15,200/km^{2} (39,300/sq mi)

Periuk is a town and an administrative district (kecamatan) of Tangerang City, in Banten Province of Indonesia, on the island of Java. The district covers an area of 9.54 km^{2}, and had a population of 129,384 at the 2010 Census and 141,003 at the 2020 Census; the official estimate as at mid 2023 was 144,640.

== Communities ==
Periuk District is sub-divided into five urban communities (kelurahan), listed below with their areas and their officially-estimated populations as at mid 2022, together with their postcodes.

Kode Wilayah	Name of kelurahan	Area in km^{2}	Population mid 2022 estimate	Post code
36.71.08.1001	Periuk (town)	1.62	25,805	15131
36.71.08.1002	Gembor	3.03	31,796	15133
36.71.08.1003	Gebang Raya	1.60	41,965	15132
36.71.08.1004	Sangiang Jaya	1.02	26,331	15132
36.71.08.1005	Periuk Jaya	2.28	17,707	15131
36.71.08	Totals	9.55	143,604 ^{(a)}	

Notes: (a) comprising 72,577 males and 71,027 females.
