= Rancaekek =

- Interactive map of Rancaekek
- Country: Indonesia
- Province: West Java
- Regency: Bandung

Area
  - Total: 46.49 km^{2} (17.95 sq mi)

Population
  - Total: 192,921
  - Density: 4,150/km^{2} (10,750/sq mi)
- Time zone: UTC+7 (IWST)

Rancaekek is an administrative district (Kecamatan) in the Bandung Regency, part of the West Java Province of Indonesia. The district is a plain area crossed by several rivers, namely the Cikijing, the Cimande, and the Citarik, all of which flow into the major Citarum. It is located southeast of the major West Java city of Bandung.

== Administrative divisions ==
Rancaekek District is divided into the following fourteen administrative villages - one urban Kelurahan (Rancaekek Kencana) and thirteen rural desa. These are listed below with their areas, their populations at the 2020 Census, and the official estimates as at mid 2024.

| Kode wilayah | Village | Area in km^{2} | Population Census 2020 | Population estimate mid 2024 |
|---|---|---|---|---|
| 32.04.28.2001 | Rancaekek Wetan | 2.26 | 24,430 | 24,661 |
| 32.04.28.2002 | Rancaekek Kulon | 3.25 | 13,910 | 15,004 |
| 32.04.28.2003 | Bojongsalam | 2.00 | 6,990 | 7,531 |
| 32.04.28.2004 | Bojongloa | 4.24 | 20,220 | 22,132 |
| 32.04.28.2005 | Jelegong | 4.37 | 21,920 | 22,912 |
| 32.04.28.2006 | Linggar | 3.51 | 11,800 | 11,841 |
| 32.04.28.2007 | Cangkuang | 5.73 | 14,280 | 14,033 |
| 32.04.28.2008 | Haurpugur | 3.85 | 8,100 | 8,869 |
| 32.04.28.2009 | Sukamanah | 4.77 | 8,250 | 8,948 |
| 32.04.28.2010 | Sukamulya | 3.50 | 9,070 | 9,417 |
| 32.04.28.2011 | Tegal Sumedang | 4.07 | 4,440 | 5,010 |
| 32.04.28.2012 | Sangiang | 2.64 | 7,250 | 7,771 |
| 32.04.28.2013 | Nanjung Mekar | 1.42 | 12,180 | 12,286 |
| 32.04.28.1014 | Rancaekek Kencana | 1.09 | 22,670 | 22,506 |
| | Totals | 46.49 | 185,499 | 192,921 |
