= Jambe, Indonesia =

Jambe
- Village and district
- Location in Java and Indonesia Jambe (Indonesia)
- Coordinates: 6°18′57″S 106°29′07″E
- Country: Indonesia
- Province: Banten
- Regency: Tangerang Regency
- Established: 29 November 2000

Area
  - Total: 28.25 km^{2} (10.91 sq mi)

Population (mid 2024 estimate)
  - Total: 58,700
  - Density: 2,080/km^{2} (5,380/sq mi)

Jambe is a village and an administrative district (kecamatan) located in the Tangerang Regency of Banten Province on Java, Indonesia. The district covers a land area of 28.25 km^{2}, and had a population of 40,187 at the 2010 Census and 51,136 at the 2020 Census; the official estimate as of mid-2024 was 58,700 (comprising 29,976 males and 28,724 females). The district administration is at Tiparaya.

== History ==
Jambe was previously part of Tigaraksa district before it was split off from the southern part of the district in 2000.

== Villages ==
Jambe District is sub-divided into ten villages (desa), all sharing the postcode of 15720, listed below with their areas and their officially-estimated populations as of mid-2024.

Kode Wilayah	Name of desa	Area in km^{2}	Population mid 2024 estimate
36.03.04.2008	Mekarsari	2.78	5,100
36.03.04.2005	Daru	2.56	8,787
36.03.04.2001	Suka Manah	4.51	4,975
36.03.04.2004	Taban	4.79	7,908
36.03.04.2009	Ancol Pasir	1.89	3,238
36.03.04.2007	Rancabuaya	2.12	4,421
36.03.04.2003	Tiparraya	2.17	4,978
36.03.04.2002	Jambe (village)	3.04	8,666
36.03.04.2006	Kutruk	2.26	6,673
36.03.04.2010	Pasir Barat	2.12	3,954
36.03.04	Totals	28.25	58,700
