= Cisoka =

- Village and district
- Interactive map of Cisoka
- Coordinates: 6°15′47″S 106°25′22″E
- Country: Indonesia
- Province: Banten
- Regency: Tangerang Regency
- Established: 26 April 1983

Area
  - Total: 31.21 km^{2} (12.05 sq mi)

Population (mid 2024 estimate)
  - Total: 103,214
  - Density: 3,307/km^{2} (8,565/sq mi)

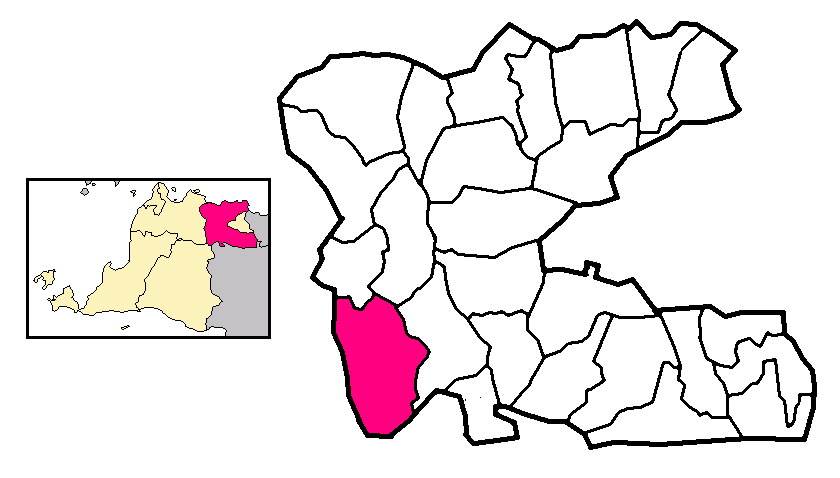
Cisoka District, Tangerang

Cisoka is a village and an administrative district (kecamatan) located in the Tangerang Regency of Banten Province on Java, Indonesia. The district covers a land area of 31.21 km^{2}, and had a population of 78,854 at the 2010 Census and 96,433 at the 2020 Census; the official estimate as of mid-2024 was 103,214 (comprising 52,903 males and 50,311 females). The administrative centre is at the village of Cisoka.

== History ==
Cisoka was previously part of Tigaraksa district before it was split off from the western part of that district in 1983.

== Villages ==
Cisoka District is sub-divided into ten villages (desa), all sharing the postcode of 15730, listed below with their areas and their officially-estimated populations as of mid-2024.

Kode Wilayah	Name of desa	Area in km^{2}	Population mid 2024 estimate
36.03.05.2001	Cisoka (village)	3.67	12,223
36.03.05.2002	Caringin	2.73	9,976
36.03.05.2003	Selapajang	2.18	11,063
36.03.05.2004	Sukatani	2.38	11,388
36.03.05.2006	Bojongloa	2.48	8,225
36.03.05.2007	Cibugel	2.15	10,659
36.03.05.2008	Cempaka	3.11	11,123
36.03.05.2009	Carenang	6.26	7,826
36.03.05.2014	Karangharja	2.44	7,177
36.03.05.2017	Jeung Jing	3.81	13,554
36.03.28	Totals	31.21	103,214
