= Sepatan =

Coordinates: 6°6′51.37″S 106°34′42.13″E

- Town and district
- Regent office (2024)
- Interactive map of Sepatan
- Country: Indonesia
- Province: Banten
- Regency: Tangerang Regency

Area
  - Total: 19.22 km^{2} (7.42 sq mi)

Population (mid 2024 estimate)
  - Total: 117,734
  - Density: 6,126/km^{2} (15,870/sq mi)

Sepatan is a town and an administrative district (kecamatan) within Tangerang Regency in the province of Banten on Java, Indonesia. The former northern and eastern half of this district were split off in 1992 and 2006 to form a new Pakuhaji District and Sepatan Timur District, respectively; the residual district now covers an area of 19.22 km^{2} and had a population of 92,353 in 2010 and 116,290 in 2020; the official estimate as at mid 2024 was 117,734 (comprising 60,357 males and 57,377 females). It borders on the city of Tangerang to the southwest, and comprises the town (kelurahan) of Sepatan together with seven rural villages (desa), all eight sharing the postcode of 15520.

== Communities ==
The areas and mid-2024 populations of the town of Sepatan and the seven villages were as follows:

Kode Wilayah	Name of kelurahan or desa	Area in km^{2}	Pop'n mid 2024 estimate
36.03.16.1001	Sepatan (town)	2.59	14,466
36.03.16.2002	Karet	2.85	21,871
36.03.16.2003	Kayu Agung	2.30	14,384
36.03.16.2004	Kayu Bongkok	2.79	8,397
36.03.16.2008	Pondok Jaya	1.48	12,924
36.03.16.2011	Pisangan Jaya	2.83	21,832
36.03.16.2012	Mekar Jaya	2.79	10,618
36.03.16.2015	Sarakan	1.60	13,242
36.03.16	Totals	19.22	117,734
