= Kosambi, Tangerang =

Kosambi
- Town and district
- Interactive map of Kosambi
- Country: Indonesia
- Province: Banten
- Regency: Tangerang Regency
- Established: 14 August 1992

Area
  - Total: 36.09 km^{2} (13.93 sq mi)

Population (mid 2024 estimate)
  - Total: 116,395
  - Density: 3,225/km^{2} (8,353/sq mi)

Kosambi is an administrative district (kecamatan) located in the Tangerang Regency of Banten Province on the island of Java, Indonesia.

Kosambi was previously part of Teluknaga district before it was split off from the eastern part of that district in 1992.

It covers an area of 36.09 km^{2}, and had a population of 131,011 at the 2010 Census and 115,260 at the 2020 Census; the official estimate as at mid 2024 was 116,395 - comprising 59,264 males and 57,131 females. The administrative centre of the district is at Selembaran Jaya and the district comprises 3 urban villages (kelurahan) and 7 classed as rural villages (desa), as listed below with their areas, officially-estimated populations as at mid 2024, and their postcodes. Kosambi District is also the location of the PIK 2 development.

Kode Wilayah	Name of Kelurahan or Desa	Status Kelu. or Desa	Area in km^{2}	Pop'n mid 2024 Estimate	Post codes
36.03.14.1001	Kosambi Barat	kelu.	3.21	5,541	15213
36.03.14.2002	Kosambi Timur	desa	3.17	11,008	15213
36.03.14.1003	Salembaran Jaya	kelu.	8.44	18,017	15214
36.03.14.2004	Salembaran Jati	desa	4.30	6,925	15214
36.03.14.2005	Rawa Rengas	desa	4.00	7,391	15215
36.03.14.2006	Rawa Burung	desa	2.05	9,018	15215
36.03.14.2007	Cengklong	desa	1.93	14,085	15212
36.03.14.2008	Belimbing	desa	2.61	15,389	15212
36.03.14.2009	Jatimulya	desa	1.81	8,803	15211
36.03.14.1010	Dadap	kelu.	4.58	20,218	15211
36.03.14	Totals		36.09	116,395	
