= Carita (Indonesia) =

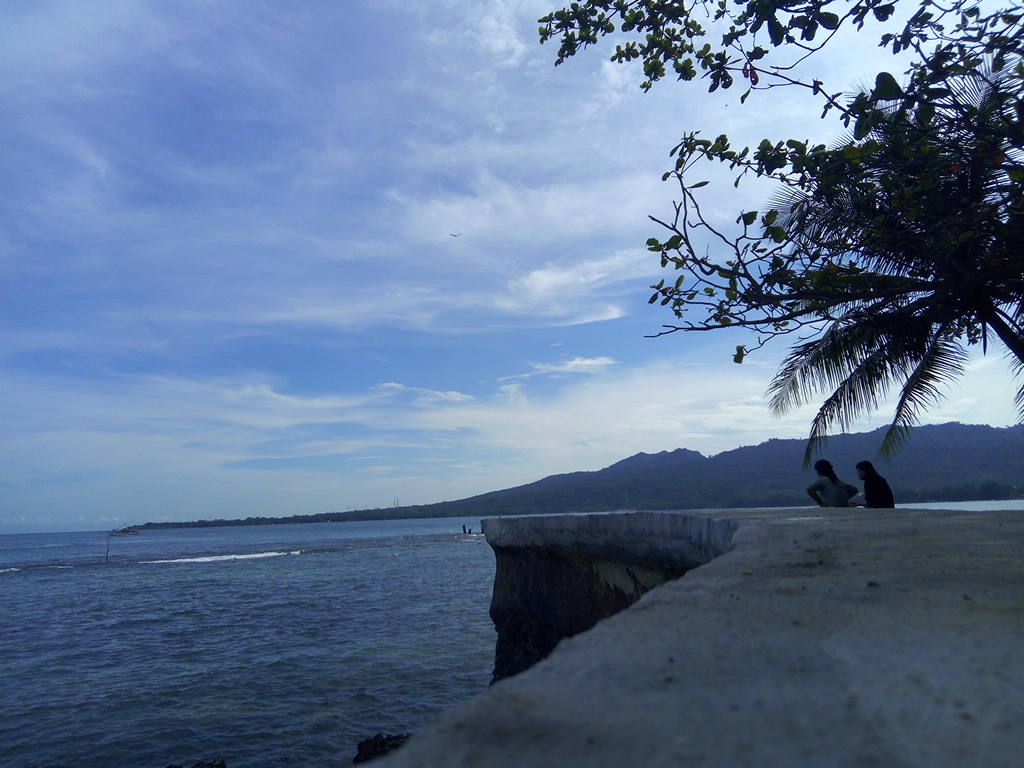
- The beach at Carita
- Interactive map of Carita
- Coordinates: 6.283°S 105.851°E
- Country: Indonesia
- Province: Banten
- Regency: Pandeglang
- District: Carita

Carita is a district of Pandeglang Regency, Banten Province, Indonesia. It includes 10 villages.

Carita is known for its diverse fauna and flora. Trees include teak, mahogany, African mahogany and dab bungur. Animals include wild boar, red giant flying squirrel and long-tailed macaque. Reptiles include monitor lizard and python. Birds include brown boobook, black-banded barbet and Javan banded pitta.

Carita Beach is a popular tourist destination.
