= Rajeg =

- Village and District
- Interactive map of Rajeg
- Country: Indonesia
- Province: Banten
- Regency: Tangerang Regency

Area
  - Total: 49.49 km^{2} (19.11 sq mi)

Population (mid 2024 estimate)
  - Total: 150,440
  - Density: 3,040/km^{2} (7,873/sq mi)

Rajeg is a village and an administrative district (kecamatan) located in the Tangerang Regency of Banten Province on Java, Indonesia. Until 2024 it covered an area of 53.31 km^{2}, and had a population of 133,274 at the 2010 Census and 190,946 at the 2020 Census; the official estimate as at mid 2023 was 188,209 (comprising 96,318 males and 91,891 females); the Regency official statistics published by BPS on 28 February 2025 gave a mid-2024 population estimate as 193,899. However, in the 2025 published statistics, the area was reduced to 49.49 km^{2}, and the mid-2024 estimated population reduced to 150,440 (comprising 77,115 males and 73,325 females), as shown below; no explanation for this large discrepancy has currently been given. The district's administrative centre is at Mekarsari and the district is sub-divided into one town (kelurahan) - Sukatani - and twelve villages (desa), all sharing the postcode of 15540.

== Communities ==
The areas and populations of the town and twelve villages are listed below; in view of the discrepancy between the 2023 and 2024 figures, both sets are given below.

Kode Wilayah	Name of kelurahan or desa	Area in km^{2} (2023)	Pop'n mid 2023 estimate	Area in km^{2} (2024)	Pop'n mid 2024 estimate
36.03.11.2005	Jambu Karya	5.07	7,280	5.07	7,578
36.03.11.2013	Daon	4.92	12,376	4.92	12,993
36.03.11.1010	Sukatani (town)	5.89	24,789	5.89	25,968
36.03.11.2014	Mekarsari	4.88	34,699	2.78	11,734
36.03.11.2011	Sukasari	3.44	11,050	3.44	7,280
36.03.11.2002	Rajeg Mulya	3.33	13,194	3.33	15,263
36.03.11.2001	Rajeg (village)	3.26	15,664	3.26	16,897
36.03.11.2007	Sukamanah	6.22	22,279	4.51	4,975
36.03.11.2003	Pangarengan	6.14	11,774	6.14	12,232
36.03.11.2012	Ranca Bango	3.09	7,079	3.09	7,523
36.03.11.2006	Lembang Sari	1.97	9,441	1.97	9,881
36.03.11.2008	Tanjakan	2.63	10,440	2.63	11,027
36.03.11.2009	Tanjakan Mekar	2.47	8,144	2.47	9,269
36.03.11	Totals	53.31	188,209	49.49	150,440
