= Pakuhaji =

- Town and district
- Interactive map of Pakuhaji
- Country: Indonesia
- Province: Banten
- Regency: Tangerang Regency
- Established: 14 August 1992

Area
  - Total: 54.55 km^{2} (21.06 sq mi)

Population (mid 2024 estimate)
  - Total: 132,734
  - Density: 2,433/km^{2} (6,302/sq mi)

Pakuhaji is a town and a district (kecamatan) located in the Tangerang Regency of Banten Province on Java, Indonesia. It has a land area of 54.55 km^{2} and had a population of 103,506 at the 2010 Census and 119,050 at the 2020 Census; the official estimate as at mid 2024 was 132,734 (comprising 68,343 males and 64,391 females). The administrative centre is in the village of Buaran Bambu.

Pakuhaji was previously part of Sepatan district before it was split off from the northern part of the district in 1992.

The district is composed of the town (kelurahan) of Pakuhaji and thirteen others (desa), as tabulated below, with all fourteen sharing the postcode of 15570.

The village of Kramat formed part of the particuliere landerij or private domain of Tan Eng Goan, 1st Majoor der Chinezen of Batavia, and of his successor, the 2nd Majoor Tan Tjoen Tiat.

Kode Wilayah	Name of Kelurahan or Desa	Area in sq. km	Pop'n mid 2024 Estimate
36.03.15.1001	Pakuhaji (town)	2.63	12,311
36.03.15.2002	Paku Alam	2.31	8,027
36.03.15.2003	Bunisari	1.37	7,701
36.03.15.2004	Rawaboni	2.06	8,641
36.03.15.2005	Buaran Mangga	3.30	5,215
36.03.15.2006	Buaran Bambu	2.80	8,947
36.03.15.2007	Kalibaru	4.99	10,252
36.03.15.2008	Kohod	9.07	8,376
36.03.15.2009	Kramat	7.42	9,006
36.03.15.2010	Sukawali	4.34	9,377
36.03.15.2011	Surya Bahari	2.99	9,825
36.03.15.2012	Kiara Payung	3.44	16,457
36.03.15.2013	Laksana	4.08	6,530
36.03.15.2014	Gaga	3.73	12,069
36.03.15	Totals	54.55	132,734
