= Pasarkemis =

Coordinates: 6°10′13″S 106°31′48″E

- Town and district
- Interactive map of Pasarkemis
- Country: Indonesia
- Province: Banten
- Regency: Tangerang City

Area
  - Total: 30.73 km^{2} (11.86 sq mi)

Population (mid 2024 estimate)
  - Total: 263,289
  - Density: 8,568/km^{2} (22,190/sq mi)

Pasarkemis is an administrative district within Tangerang Regency in the province of Banten, on Java, Indonesia. It covers an area of 30.73 km^{2} and had a population of 238,377 at the 2010 Census and 273,659 at the 2020 Census; the official estimate as of mid-2024 was 263,289 (comprising 133,377 males and 129,912 females). The administrative centre is at Sukamantri.

== Communities ==
Pasarkemis District is sub-divided into four urban towns or kelurahan (Sindangsari, Kuta Baru, Kuta Jaya and Kutabumi) and five rural villages (desa - Pasar Kemis, Sukamantri. Gelam Jaya, Pangadegan and Suka Asih), all sharing the postcode of 15560. These are listed below with their areas and their officially-estimated populations as of mid-2024.

Kode Wilayah	Name of kelurahan or desa	Area in km^{2}	Population mid 2024 estimate
36.03.12.2015	Suka Asih	2.39	14,260
36.03.12.2001	Pasarkemis	1.69	20,751
36.03.12.2008	Sukamantri	5.55	33,002
36.03.12.1012	Kuta Jaya	1.23	31,211
36.03.12.2013	Gelam Jaya	2.96	37,888
36.03.12.1014	Kuta Baru	3.82	30,159
36.03.12.1010	Kuta Bumi	3.31	43,107
36.03.12.2011	Pangadegan	5.15	16,073
36.03.12.1005	Sindang Sari	4.65	36,838
36.03.12	Totals	30.73	263,289
