= Legok =

- Town and district
- Interactive map of Legok
- Country: Indonesia
- Province: Banten
- Regency: Tangerang Regency

Area
  - Total: 37.74 km^{2} (14.57 sq mi)

Population (mid 2024 estimate)
  - Total: 127,548
  - Density: 3,380/km^{2} (8,753/sq mi)

Legok is a town and an administrative district (kecamatan) located in the Tangerang Regency of Banten Province on Java, Indonesia (not to be confused with the district of the same name in Pasuruan Regency). The district covers a land area of 37.74 km^{2} and had a population of 98,171 at the 2010 Census and 118,391 at the 2020 Census; the official estimate as of mid-2024 was 127,548 (comprising 65,278 males and 62,270 females). The district centre is at Caringin.

== Communities ==
Legok District is sub-divided into the town (kelurahan) of Babakan and ten villages (desa), all sharing the postcode of 15820, listed below with their areas and their officially-estimated populations as of mid-2024.

Kode Wilayah	Name of kelurahan or desa	Area in km^{2}	Population mid 2024 estimate
36.03.20.2005	Ciangir	3.57	7,405
36.03.20.2004	Babat	4.08	9,700
36.03.20.2008	Bojong Kamal	3.29	8,150
36.03.20.2012	Cirarab	3.60	7,948
36.03.20.2002	Caringin	2.73	9,976
36.03.20.1011	Babakan	1.97	15,178
36.03.20.2010	Kamuning	2.48	9,271
36.03.20.2007	Pala Sari	4.82	13,327
36.03.20.2003	Serdang Wetan	3.23	15,979
36.03.20.2009	Rancagong	5.54	15,216
36.03.20.2006	Legok (town)	2.43	15,398
36.03.20	Totals	37.74	127,548

The villages (desa) of Ciangir and Babat (in the west), and Bojong Kamal and Cirarab (to the east), all border directly on West Java Province to their south.
