= Kronjo =

Coordinates: 6°04′S 106°25′E

- Village and district
- Interactive map of Kronjo
- Country: Indonesia
- Province: Banten
- Regency: Tangerang Regency

Area
  - Total: 46.51 km^{2} (17.96 sq mi)

Population (mid 2024 estimate)
  - Total: 68,093
  - Density: 1,464/km^{2} (3,792/sq mi)

Kronjo is a village and an administrative district (kecamatan) located in the Tangerang Regency of Banten Province on Java, Indonesia. It covers an area of 46.51 km^{2}, and has a population of 55,152 at the 2010 Census and 61,719 at the 2020 Census; the official estimate as of mid-2024 was 68,093 (comprising 34,240 males and 33,853 females). The district administrative centre is at Pagedangan Ilir, which is one of the ten villages (desa) comprising the district and all sharing the postcode of 15550. They are listed below with their areas and their officially-estimated populations as of mid-2024.

Kode Wilayah	Name of Desa	Area in km^{2}	Pop'n mid 2024 estimate
36.03.07.2015	Blukbuk	3.17	5,850
36.03.07.2013	Bakung	3.16	9,241
36.03.07.2006	Pasir	2.72	4,863
36.03.07.2017	Cirumpak	2.94	5,051
36.03.07.2009	Pagedungan Udik	3.68	6,721
36.03.07.2010	Pasilian	4.33	7,431
36.03.07.2002	Pagenjahan	2.16	6,914
36.03.07.2007	Muncung	9.32	6,090
36.03.07.2001	Kronjo (village)	6.81	8,560
36.03.07.2008	Pagedungan Ilir	8.23	7,372
36.03.07	Totals	46.51	68,093
