= Kresek =

Coordinates: 6°07′53″S 106°22′48″E

- Village and district
- Interactive map of Kresek
- Country: Indonesia
- Province: Banten
- Regency: Tangerang Regency

Area
  - Total: 29.99 km^{2} (11.58 sq mi)

Population (mid 2024 estimate)
  - Total: 74,297
  - Density: 2,477/km^{2} (6,416/sq mi)

Kresek is a village and an administrative district (kecamatan) within Tangerang Regency in the province of Banten, on Java, Indonesia. The district covers a land area of 29.99 km^{2}, and had a population at the 2010 Census of 60,735 and at the 2020 Census of 68,039; the official estimate as of mid-2024 was 74,297 (comprising 37,764 males and 36,533 females). The administrative centre is at the village of Kresek, and the district is sub-divided into nine villages (desa), all sharing the postcode of 15621, and listed below with their areas and their officially-estimated populations as of mid-2024.

Kode Wilayah	Name of Desa	Area in km^{2}	Pop'n mid 2024 estimate
36.03.06.2013	Koper	3.33	4,984
36.03.06.2001	Pasir Ampo	2.87	6,624
36.03.06.2015	Patra Sana	2.77	8,802
36.03.06.2009	Renged	2.53	8,956
36.03.06.2011	Talok	2.44	7,700
36.03.06.2014	Jengkol	3.87	7,254
36.03.06.2007	Kemuning	5.44	10,798
36.03.06.2003	Ranca Ilat	2.78	8,052
36.03.06.2018	Kresek (village)	3.97	11,127
36.03.06	Totals	29.99	74,297
