= Mauk, Indonesia =

Mauk
- Town and district
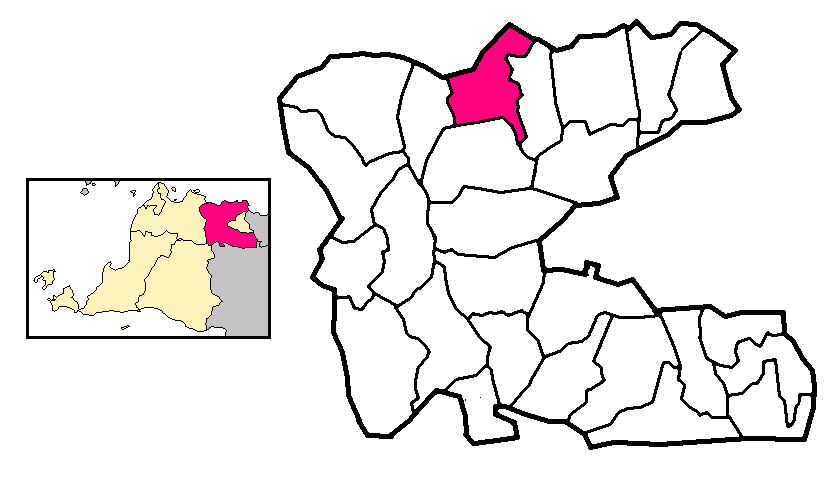
- Mauk within the Banten district.
- Country: Indonesia
- Province: Banten
- Regency: Tangerang Regency

Area
  - Total: 44.94 km^{2} (17.35 sq mi)

Population (mid 2024 estimate)
  - Total: 94,536
  - Density: 2,104/km^{2} (5,448/sq mi)

Mauk is an administrative district (kecamatan) located in the Tangerang Regency of Banten Province on Java, Indonesia, as well as a town situated within that district. The district covers a land area of 44.94 km^{2}, and had a population of 77,599 at the 2010 Census and 85,573 at the 2020 Census; the official estimate as of mid-2024 was 94,536 (comprising 48,399 males and 46,137 females). The administrative centre of the district is at Mauk Timur (East Mauk), which has the status of a town (kelurahan), while there are also eleven rural villages (desa) in the district, all twelve sharing the postcode of 15531. They are listed below with their areas and their officially-estimated populations as of mid-2024.

Kode Wilayah	Name of kelurahan or Desa	Area in km^{2}	Pop'n mid 2024 estimate
36.03.08.2006	Gunung Sari	3.83	4,930
36.03.08.2005	Sasak	2.75	6,323
36.03.08.2007	Kedung Dalem	3.38	8,933
36.03.08.2003	Tegal Kunir Kidul	4.15	10,377
36.03.08.2010	Jati Waringin	2.42	9,102
36.03.08.2004	Tegal Kunir Lor	3.69	8,693
36.03.08.2011	Banyu Asih	1.11	8,367
36.03.08.1002	Mauk Timur (East Mauk)	1.95	6,081
36.03.08.2001	Mauk Barat (West Mauk)	6.88	7,007
36.03.08.2012	Ketapang	4.77	7,329
36.03.08.2008	Marga Mulya	6.14	8,449
36.03.08.2009	Tanjung Anom	3.89	8,945
36.03.08	Totals	44.94	94,536
