= Balaraja =

Coordinates: 6°31′00″S 107°55′01″E

- Town and district
- Interactive map of Balaraja
- Country: Indonesia
- Province: Banten
- Regency: Tangerang Regency

Area
  - Total: 32.30 km^{2} (12.47 sq mi)

Population (mid 2024 estimate)
  - Total: 128,824
  - Density: 3,988/km^{2} (10,330/sq mi)
- Time zone: UTC+7

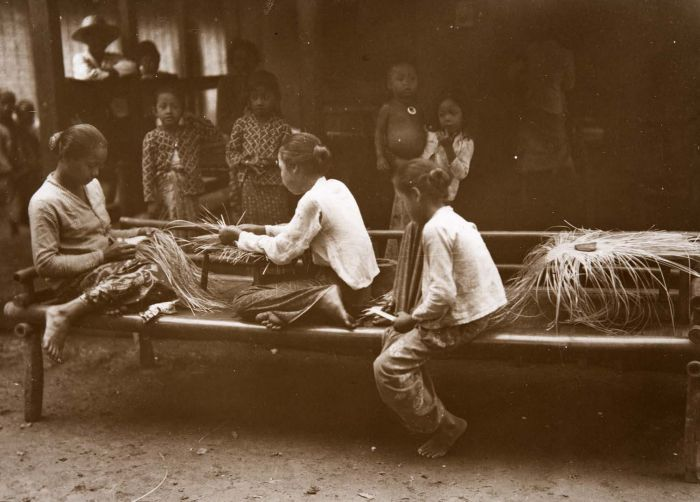
Women plaiting hats at Balaraja (1920-1935)

Balaraja is a town and an administrative district (kecamatan) within Tangerang Regency in the province of Banten, on Java, Indonesia.

The district covers a land area of 32.30 km^{2}, and had a population of 111,475 at the 2010 Census and 119,409 at the 2020 Census; the official estimate as of mid-2024 was 128,824 (comprising 65,594 males and 63,230 females). The administrative centre is at Talagasari, and the district is sub-divided into one urban kelurahan (the town of Balaraja) and eight rural villages (desa), all nine sharing the postcode 15610, and listed below with their areas and their officially-estimated populations as of mid-2024.

| Kode Wilayah | Name of Kelurahan or Desa | Area in sq. km | Pop'n mid 2024 estimate |
|---|---|---|---|
| 36.03.01.2011 | Gembong | 3.94 | 13,349 |
| 36.03.01.2003 | Cangkudu | 5.16 | 16,675 |
| 36.03.01.2010 | Sentul | 3.46 | 10,653 |
| 36.03.01.2016 | Sentul Jaya | 2.36 | 6,741 |
| 36.03.01.2005 | Talagasari | 2.56 | 11,624 |
| 36.03.01.1001 | Balaraja (town) | 2.00 | 11,316 |
| 36.03.01.2009 | Tobat | 5.25 | 16,045 |
| 36.03.01.2013 | Sukamurni | 3.32 | 7,718 |
| 36.03.01.2014 | Saga | 4.25 | 34,703 |
| 36.03.01 | Totals | 32.30 | 128,824 |

== Transportation ==
Planned Jakarta MRT Phase 3

The upcoming Jakarta MRT Phase 3, scheduled to begin construction in 2024, will extend from Cikarang to Balaraja. This phase marks a significant development in Jakarta's transportation infrastructure, as Balaraja will serve as the starting station for the Jakarta MRT Phase 3.

Balaraja, strategically located in the western region, will become a vital hub for the MRT network, connecting the eastern and western parts of the Greater Jakarta area. The introduction of this new line aims to alleviate traffic congestion, enhance public transportation efficiency, and promote sustainable urban mobility.

With Balaraja as the initial station, the MRT Phase 3 project will not only improve accessibility for residents in the western suburbs but also integrate seamlessly with other transportation modes, fostering greater connectivity across the region. This development is expected to spur economic growth and contribute to the overall improvement of public transportation in Jakarta.

== Toll Road access ==
| Toll Road | Toll Gate | KM |
|---|---|---|
| Tangerang–Merak Toll Road | Balaraja Timur | 36 |
| Tangerang–Merak Toll Road | Balaraja Barat | 38 |
