= Curug, Tangerang =

Curug
- Town and district
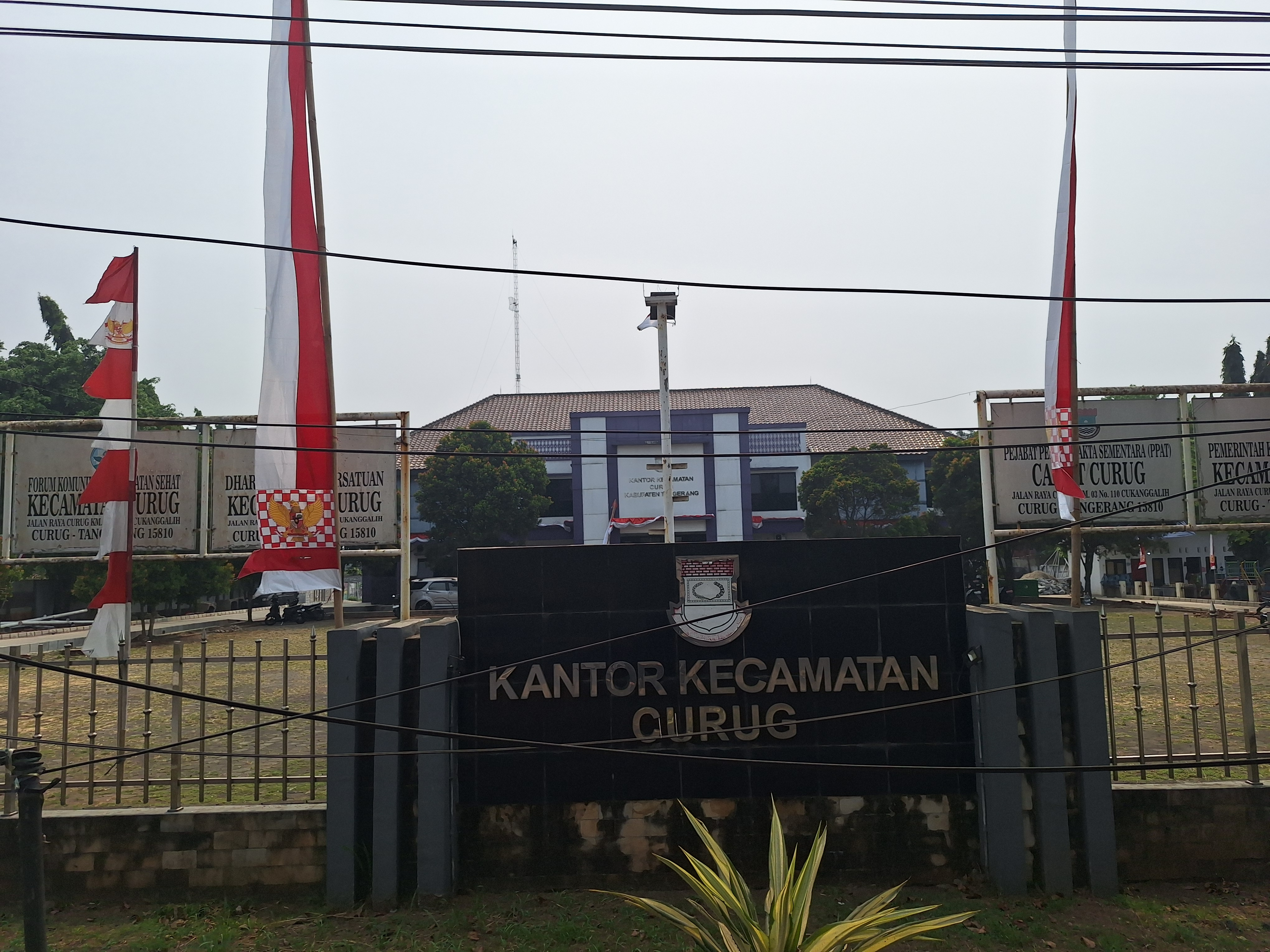
- Regent Office (2024)

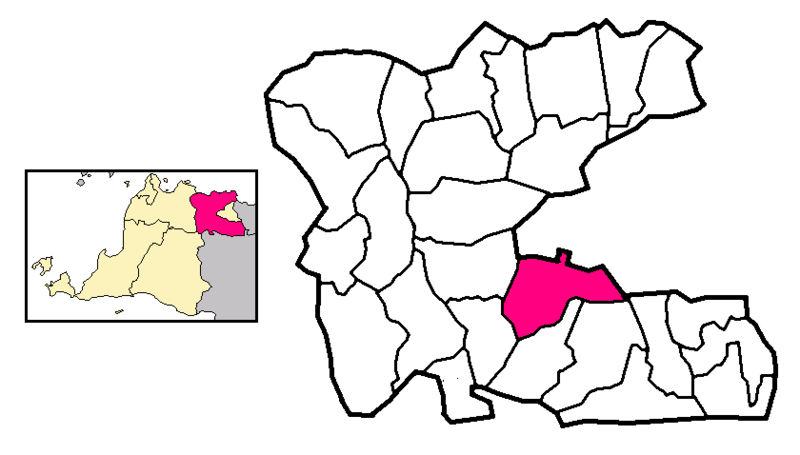
- District location

- Location in Java
- Coordinates: 6°22′16″S 106°48′0″E
- Country: Indonesia
- Province: Banten
- Regency: Tangerang Regency

Area
  - Total: 30.83 km^{2} (11.90 sq mi)

Population (mid 2024 estimate)
  - Total: 183,904
  - Density: 5,965/km^{2} (15,450/sq mi)

Curug is a town and an administrative district (kecamatan) within Tangerang Regency in the province of Banten, on Java, Indonesia (not to be confused with the district of the same name in Serang city). The town comprises two of the villages within the district, and had a population of 37,552 as of mid-2024, in an area of 6.94 km^{2}. The district covers a land area of 30.83 km^{2} and had a population of 165,812 at the 2010 Census and 174,867 at the 2020 Census; the official estimate as at mid 2024 was 183,904 (comprising 92,890 males and 91,014 females). The administrative centre is at Cukanggalih.

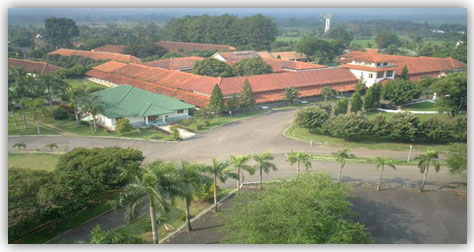
Curug flight school

== Communities ==
Curug District is sub-divided into three urban kelurahan (Binong, Curug Kulon and Sukabakti) and four rural villages (desa), all sharing the postcode of 15810. These are listed below with their areas and their officially-estimated populations as of mid-2024.

Kode Wilayah	Name of kelurahan or desa	Area in km^{2}	Population mid 2024 estimate
36.03.17.1001	Curug Kulon	2.73	20,681
36.03.17.2002	Curug Wetan	4.21	16,871
36.03.17.1005	Suka Bakti	2.22	20,884
36.03.17.2010	Cukang Galih	4.66	16,074
36.03.17.2004	Kadu Jaya	4.37	18,054
36.03.17.2003	Kadu	7.24	31,119
36.03.17.1006	Binong	5.39	60,221
36.03.17	Totals	30.83	183,904

Kurug Kulon, Cukamgalih and Kadu Jaya are situated in the western half of the district, while Kulon Wetan, Binong, Sukabakti and Kadu villages together form the eastern half.
