= Cikupa =

Coordinates: 6°29′41″S 106°39′04″E

- Village and district
- Interactive map of Cikupa
- Country: Indonesia
- Province: Banten
- Regency: Tangerang Regency

Area
  - Total: 45.75 km^{2} (17.66 sq mi)

Population (mid 2024 estimate)
  - Total: 207,659
  - Density: 4,539/km^{2} (11,760/sq mi)

Cikupa is a village and an administrative district (kecamatan) within Tangerang Regency in the province of Banten, on Java, Indonesia. The district covers an area of 45.75 km^{2}, and had a population of 224,678 at the 2010 Census and 208,302 at the 2020 Census; the official estimate as of mid-2024 was 207,659 (comprising 105,962 males and 101,6976 females). The administrative centre is at Budimulya.

== Communities ==
Cikupa District is sub-divided into two urban kelurahan (Sukamulya and Bunder) and twelve rural villages (desa), all fourteen sharing the postcode of 15710, listed below with their areas and their officially-estimated populations as of mid-2024.

Kode Wilayah	Name of kelurahan or desa	Area in km^{2}	Population mid 2024 estimate
36.03.18.2013	Budi Mulya	3.91	5,836
36.03.18.2014	Bojong	3.45	15,389
36.03.18.1001	Sukamulya	3.46	25,620
36.03.18.2007	Cikupa (village)	2.04	16,818
36.03.18.2006	Dukuh	3.67	16,249
36.03.18.2009	Bitung Jaya	2.32	12,053
36.03.18.1003	Bunder	5.50	11,952
36.03.18.2011	Sukadamai	4.09	16,141
36.03.18.2012	Pasir Jaya	2.47	21,527
36.03.18.2010	Pasir Gadung	2.07	17,321
36.03.18.2005	Talagasari	2.56	11,624
36.03.18.2004	Talaga	5.53	16,639
36.03.18.2008	Sukanagara	1.84	9,502
36.03.18.2002	Cibadak	2.85	10,988
36.03.18	Totals	45.75	207,659
