= Tigaraksa =

Coordinates: 6°16′S 106°28′E

- Town and district
- Interactive map of Tigaraksa
- Country: Indonesia
- Province: Banten
- Regency: Tangerang Regency

Area
  - Total: 55.30 km^{2} (21.35 sq mi)

Population (mid 2024 estimate)
  - Total: 170,918
  - Density: 3,091/km^{2} (8,005/sq mi)

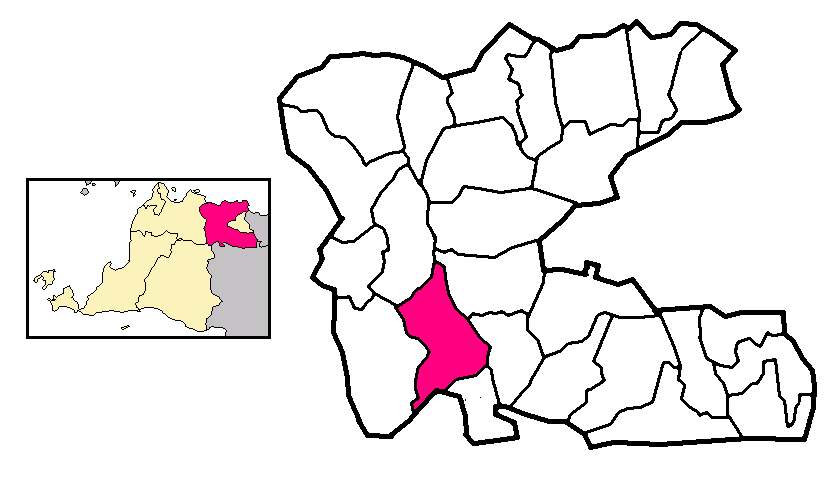
Location of Tigaraksa within the Kabupaten Regency

Tigaraksa (Indonesian pronunciation: [t̪iɡaˈrak̚sa]) is a town (kota) and an administrative district (kecamatan) located in the Tangerang Regency of Banten Province on Java (island), Indonesia. The district covers a land area of 55.30 km^{2} and had 119,245 inhabitants in 2010 and 155,557 inhabitants in 2020; the official estimate as of mid-2024 was 170,918 (comprising 86,668 males and 84,250 females). The administrative headquarters of the Regency and of the district are located at the town of Tigaraksa.

== Communities ==
Tigaraksa District is sub-divided into two urban kelurahan (Tigaraksa and Kadu Agung) and twelve rural villages (desa), all fourteen sharing the postcode of 15721, listed below with their areas and their officially-estimated populations as of mid-2024.

Kode Wilayah	Name of kelurahan or desa	Area in km^{2}	Population mid 2023 estimate
36.03.03.2011	Cileles	5.91	9,900
36.03.03.2014	Bantar Panjang	5.26	9,119
36.03.03.2012	Sodong	4.22	12,908
36.03.03.2013	Tapos	4.43	10,222
36.03.03.2010	Margasari	3.96	15,693
36.03.03.1007	Kadu Agung (town)	4.34	8,707
36.03.03.2003	Mata Gara	4.03	12,968
36.03.03.1001	Tigeraksa (town)	2.87	18,306
36.03.03.2005	Pete	2.72	15,647
36.03.03.2006	Tegalsari	2.53	5,551
36.03.03.2008	Pematang	3.96	11,810
36.03.03.2004	Pasir Nangka	4.29	27,004
36.03.03.2009	Cisereh	3.72	6,653
36.03.03.2002	Pasir Bolang	3.06	6,440
36.03.03	Totals	55.30	170,918

== Climate ==
Tigaraksa has a tropical rainforest climate (Af) with moderate rainfall from June to September and heavy rainfall from October to May.

Climate data for Tigaraksa
Month	Jan	Feb	Mar	Apr	May	Jun	Jul	Aug	Sep	Oct	Nov	Dec	Year
Mean daily maximum °C (°F)	30.7 (87.3)	31.0 (87.8)	31.5 (88.7)	32.3 (90.1)	32.6 (90.7)	32.6 (90.7)	32.6 (90.7)	32.9 (91.2)	33.3 (91.9)	33.4 (92.1)	32.6 (90.7)	32.0 (89.6)	32.3 (90.1)
Daily mean °C (°F)	26.7 (80.1)	26.9 (80.4)	27.1 (80.8)	27.7 (81.9)	27.8 (82.0)	27.5 (81.5)	27.1 (80.8)	27.3 (81.1)	27.6 (81.7)	28.0 (82.4)	27.7 (81.9)	27.4 (81.3)	27.4 (81.3)
Mean daily minimum °C (°F)	22.8 (73.0)	22.9 (73.2)	22.8 (73.0)	23.0 (73.4)	23.1 (73.6)	22.4 (72.3)	21.7 (71.1)	21.7 (71.1)	22.0 (71.6)	22.6 (72.7)	22.9 (73.2)	23.0 (73.4)	22.6 (72.6)
Average rainfall mm (inches)	345 (13.6)	295 (11.6)	254 (10.0)	212 (8.3)	198 (7.8)	111 (4.4)	98 (3.9)	90 (3.5)	105 (4.1)	156 (6.1)	187 (7.4)	196 (7.7)	2,247 (88.4)
Source: Climate-Data.org
