= Tangerang Regency =

Regency in Banten, Indonesia

Tangerang Regency Kabupaten Tangerang
- Regency

Other transcription(s)
  - Sundanese: ᮊᮘᮥᮕᮒᮦᮔ᮪ ᮒᮍᮨᮛᮀ
  - Betawi: Tangerang Kabupatèn
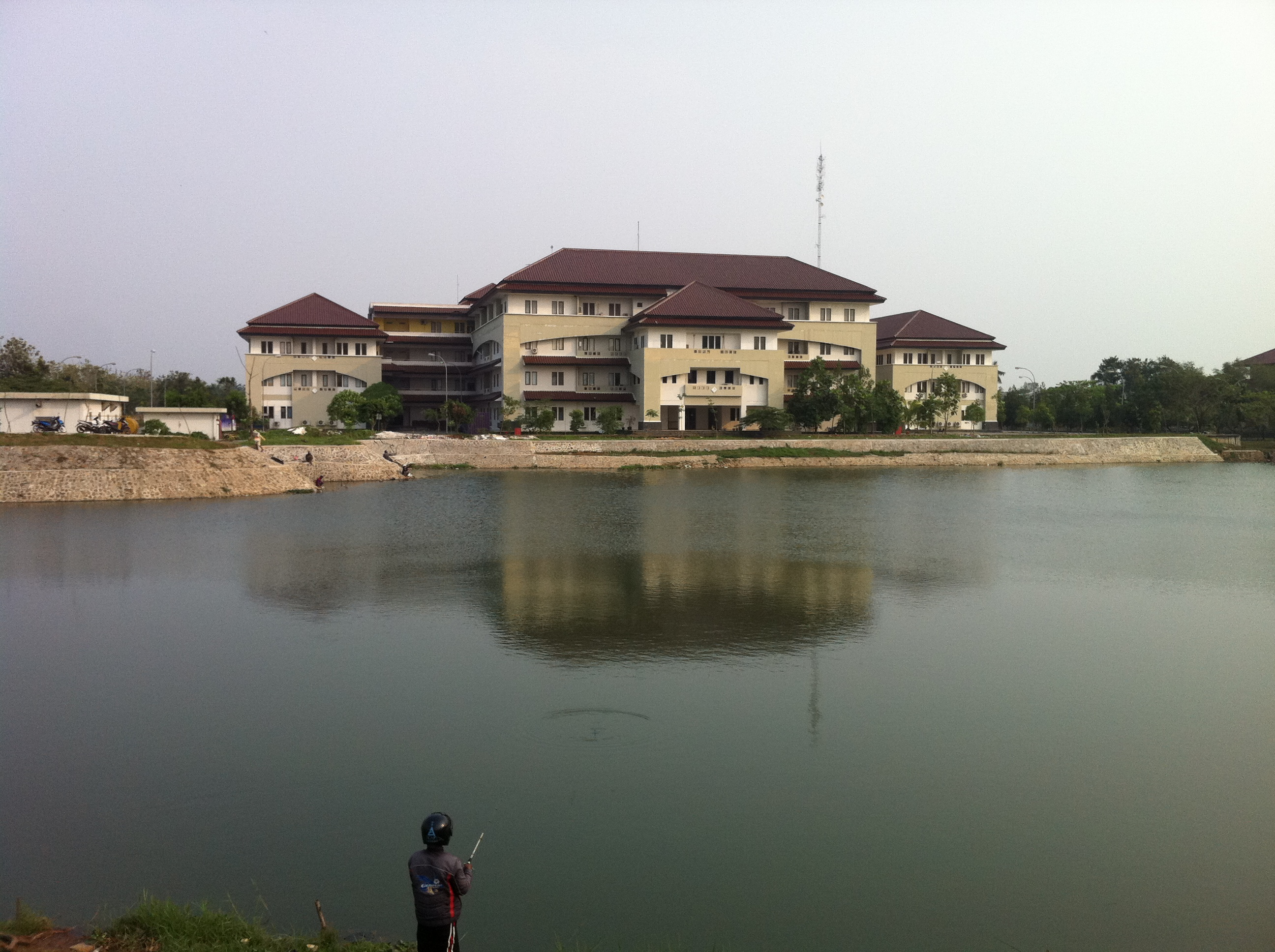
- Tangerang Regent Office

- Coat of arms
- Nickname: Kota Benteng (City of citadel)
- Motto: Satya Karya Kerta Raharja (Work faithfully towards prosperity)
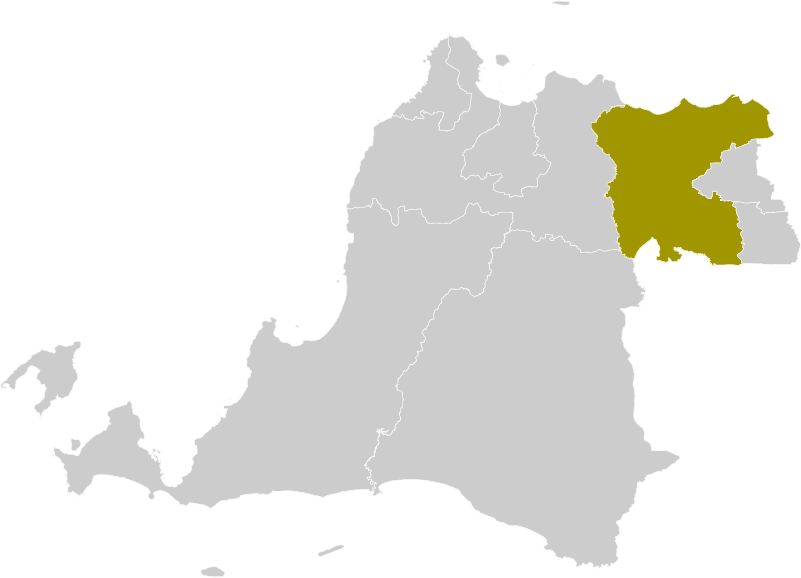
- Location within Banten
- Coordinates: 6.20°S 106.49°E
- Country: Indonesia
- Province: Banten
- Regency seat: Tigaraksa

Government
  - Regent: Maesyal Rasyid
  - Vice Regent: Intan Nurul Hikmah

Area
  - Total: 1,034.54 km^{2} (399.44 sq mi)

Population (mid 2025 estimate)
  - Total: 3,516,095
  - Density: 3,398.70/km^{2} (8,802.60/sq mi)
- Time zone: UTC+7 (WIB)
- Website: tangerangkab.go.id

Tangerang Regency is a regency (kabupaten) of Banten Province, Indonesia. It is located in the northwest of the island of Java. Though commonly misunderstood as being a part of Jakarta, Tangerang is actually outside Jakarta City but is part of the Greater Jakarta Metropolitan Region (which is called Jabodetabek, Tangerang being the "ta" of the acronym). Originally created in 1950 and then including 1,371 km^{2} of territory to the west of Jakarta, since 1993 the regency has lost territory as first Tangerang city (Kota Tangerang) was split off on 27 February 1993 and subsequently South Tangerang city (Kota Tangerang Selatan) was split off on 29 October 2008.

The residual Regency now has an area of 1,034.54 km^{2} and a population of 2,834,376 at the 2010 census, growing to 3,245,619 at the 2020 census; the latest official estimate (for mid 2025) is 3,516,095 (comprising 1,789,061 males and 1,727,034 females), with population still growing since 2020 at an average 2.83% per year. If the two cities had not been split off in 1993 and 2008, on its original boundaries the regency would have had 6,967,005 inhabitants as of mid-2025, which would have given it the largest population of any regency in Indonesia.

The current regent (bupati) is Andi Ony Prihartono (from 21 September 2023). The town of Tigaraksa is the regency seat.

Tangerang Regency is bounded by the Java Sea to the north, by Jakarta city, Tangerang city and South Tangerang city to the east, by Bogor Regency (in West Java) to the south, by a small section of Lebak Regency to the southwest, and by Serang Regency to the west.

Tangerang city was formed as an autonomous city on 27 February 1993 out of districts in the eastern part of the Tangerang Regency. The city was previously an administrative city within that Regency.

From 1993 until 2008, Tangerang Regency was divided into 36 Districts (kecamatan). On 27 October 2008, seven further districts in the south-eastern part of Tangerang Regency were cut out to form the South Tangerang autonomous city/municipality. They were Ciputat, Ciputat Timur (East Ciputat), Pamulang, Pondok Aren, Serpong, Serpong Utara (North Serpong) and Setu Districts. After losing seven districts, which were removed to form the new South Tangerang municipality, the Tangerang Regency administration planned to divide three of the remaining 29 districts into six in the near future. "We have conducted a study on the regional division, and the results suggest the division of Rajeg, Pakuhaji and Teluknaga districts", Muhamad, administration affairs chief at the regional administration said in April 2010. But these new districts have not materialised by 2025.

== Administrative districts ==
Following the creation of the cities of Tangerang and South Tangerang from parts of the regency, the present Tangerang Regency now comprises the following 29 districts (kecamatan), tabulated below with their areas and their populations at the 2010 census and the 2020 census, together with the official estimates as of mid-2025. The table also includes the locations of the district administrative centres, the number of administrative villages in each district (comprising 246 rural desa and 28 urban kelurahan), and its postal codes.

The districts are grouped below for ease of reference into five geographical areas (which have no administrative significance). The first sixteen districts in the following table indicate those sixteen districts in the southwest of Tangerang Regency which would remain in the putative renamed "Tigaraksa Regency" if government proposals to divide the existing Regency were to be carried out. The last thirteen districts are those districts in North Tangerang which would then form a separate "North Tangerang Regency". Other proposals which were considered involved creating a "Central Tangerang Municipality" (from Curug, Kelapa Dua, Legok, Pagedangan and Cisauk Districts) with some 715,305 inhabitants in mid 2025, and creating another municipality in the north-east of the regency (from Sepatan, Sepatan Timur, Pakuhaji, Teluknaga and Kosambi Districts) with some 664,144 inhabitants in mid 2025.

Kode Wilayah	Name of District (kecamatan)	Area in sq. km	Pop'n 2010 census	Pop'n 2020 census	Pop'n mid 2025 Estimate	Admin centre	No. of villages	Post codes
36.03.05	Cisoka	31.21	78,854	96,433	105,364	Cisoka	10	15730
36.03.31	Solear	34.07	73,888	95,521	111,928	Solear	7	15731
36.03.03	Tigaraksa	55.30	119,245	155,557	173,585	Tigaraksa	14 ^{(a)}	15721
36.03.04	Jambe	28.25	40,187	51,136	59,668	Tiparaya	10	15720
36.03.18	Cikupa	45.75	224,678	208,302	216,322	Budimulya	14 ^{(b)}	15710
36.03.19	Panongan	35.61	96,383	130,489	138,592	Panongan	8 ^{(c)}	15711
Totals for	Southwest area	230.19	633,235	737,438	805,459		63	
36.03.17	Curug	30.83	165,812	174,867	186,559	Cukanggalih	7 ^{(d)}	15810
36.03.28	Kelapa Dua	26.22	178,035	169,340	175,455	Curug Sangereng	6 ^{(e)}	15811
36.03.20	Legok	37.74	98,171	118,391	132,434	Caringin	11 ^{(f)}	15820
36.03.22	Pagedangan	50.75	95,194	107,897	121,572	Pagedangan	11 ^{(g)}	15330: 15339 ^{(h)}
36.03.23	Cisauk	30.05	64,083	90,846	99,285	Sampora	6 ^{(j)}	15340: 15345
Totals for	South Central area	175.59	601,295	661,341	715,305		41	
36.03.01	Balaraja	32.30	111,475	119,409	130,843	Talagasari	9 ^{(k)}	15610
36.03.02	Jayanti	24.88	63,494	65,545	74,039	Cikande	8	15611
36.03.27	Sukamulya	25.88	59,027	69,275	77,931	Sukamulya	8	15612
36.03.06	Kresek	29.99	60,735	68,039	75,530	Kresek	9	15621
36.03.32	Gunung Kaler	32.77	47,699	51,102	59,910	Gunung Kaler	9	15620
36.03.07	Kronjo	46.51	55,152	61,719	69,479	Pagedangan Ilir	10	15550
36.03.33	Mekar Baru	25.78	35,417	41,329	47,296	Mekar Baru	8	15551
Totals for	Northwest area	218.11	432,999	476,418	535,028		61	
36.03.12	Pasarkemis	30.73	238,377	273,659	265,683	Sukamantri	9 ^{(l)}	15560
36.03.29	Sindang Jaya	41.39	77,025	91,170	102,506	Sindang Asih	7	15561
36.03.08	Mauk	44.94	77,599	85,573	95,945	Mauk Timur	12 ^{(m)}	15531
36.03.09	Kemiri	33.45	40,605	48,061	54,418	Kemiri	7	15530
36.03.10	Sukadiri	24.99	53,100	63,489	70,463	Rawa Kidang	8	15532
36.03.11	Rajeg	53.30	133,274	190,946	^{(n)} 206,784	Mekarsari	13 ^{(n)}	15540
Totals for	North Central area	228.80	619,980	752,898	795,799		56	
36.03.16	Sepatan	19.22	92,353	116,690	119,432	Sepatan	8 ^{(p)}	15520
36.03.30	Sepatan Timur (East Sepatan)	19.66	81,667	105,578	113,160	Kedaung Barat	8	15521
36.03.15	Pakuhaji	54.55	103,506	119,050	135,053	Buaran Bambu	14 ^{(q)}	15570
36.03.13	Teluknaga ^{(r)}	52.41	138,330	160,946	178,331	Kampung Melayu Timur	13	15510
36.03.14	Kosambi	36.09	131,011	115,260	118,168	Selembaran Jaya	10 ^{(s)}	15211: 15215
Totals for	Northeast area	181.93	546,867	617,524	664,144		53	

Notes: (a) includes 2 kelurahan (Tigaraksa and Kadu Agung). (b) includes 2 kelurahan (Bunder and Sukamulya).
(c) includes the kelurahan of Mekar Bakti. (d) includes 3 kelurahan (Binong, Curug Kulon and Sukabakti).
(e) comprises 5 kelurahan (Bencongan, Bencongan Indah, Bojong Nangka, Kelapa Dua and Pakulonan Barat) and one desa.
(f) includes the kelurahan of Babakan. (g) includes the kelurahan of Medang.
(h) except the village of Karangtengah, which has a post code of 15157. (j) includes the kelurahan of Cisauk.
(k) includes the kelurahan of Balaraja. (l) comprises 4 kelurahan (Kuta Baru, Kutabumi, Kuta Jaya and Sindangsari) and 5 desa.
(m) includes the kelurahan of Mauk Timur. (n) includes the kelurahan of Sutatani. (p) includes the kelurahan of Sepatan.
(q) includes the kelurahan of Pakuhaji. (r) including the offshore island of Pulau Betingan.
(s) including 3 kelurahan (Dadap, Kosambi Barat and Salembaran Jaya).

== Transportation ==
=== Transportation in Tangerang Regency: Current Services and Future Developments ===
Tangerang Regency is a key area for transportation infrastructure, offering a variety of commuting options for its residents. With the current services provided by Kereta Api Indonesia, KAI Commuter, Transjakarta, and Perum DAMRI, and with future developments on the horizon, Tangerang Regency is set to become even more accessible and connected.

=== Kereta Api Indonesia and KAI Commuter ===
The Kereta Api Indonesia (KAI) service is a vital part of Tangerang Regency’s transportation network, particularly through the KAI Commuter system. The Rangkasbitung Line serves the area with six operational stations, ensuring residents can easily travel to Jakarta and other parts of the Greater Jakarta area.

The six operational Commuter Line Rangkasbitung stations in Tangerang Regency area;

- Cicayur Station
- Cikoya Station
- Cisauk Station
- Daru Station
- Tigaraksa Station

=== Transjakarta ===
- S13: Scientia Square Park - Tomang Raya
- S14: Scientia Square Park - Lebak Bulus MRT Station
- T31: PIK 2 - Blok M

== Toll Road ==
- Jakarta-Merak Toll Road
- Serpong-Balaraja Toll Road
