= Sunda Wiwitan =

Indonesian ethnic religion

- ᮞᮥᮔ᮪ᮓ ᮝᮤᮝᮤᮒᮔ᮪
- The Cakra Flower is a symbol of Sunda Wiwitan
- Abbreviation: Wiwitan
- Type: Folk religion
- Scripture: Sanghyang Siksa Kandang Karesian
- Governance: National Sunda Wiwitan Religious Council of the Republic Indonesia
- Region: Western hemisphere of Java; Banten; West Java
- Language: Baduy (mainly Tangtu Baduy); Bantenese; Old Sundanese (mainly used in rituals); Sundanese (mainly Cigugur Sundanese)
- Headquarters: West Java
- Recognition: Officially recognized by Indonesian government
- Number of followers: 50,000

Sunda Wiwitan (from Sundanese: ᮞᮥᮔ᮪ᮓ ᮝᮤᮝᮤᮒᮔ᮪) is a folk religion followed by some of the Sundanese people (including Baduy and Bantenese) in Indonesia.

The followers of this belief system can be found in some villages in western Java, such as Kanekes, Lebak, Banten; Cisolok, Sukabumi; Cireundeu in Cimahi; Kampung Pasir in Garut; and Cigugur, Kuningan Regency. In Carita Parahyangan this faith is called Jatisunda. Its practitioners assert that Sunda Wiwitan has been part of their way of life since ancient times, before the arrival of Hinduism and Islam.

The sacred book of Sunda Wiwitan is called Sanghyang Siksa Kandang Karesian. It is a didactic text of religious and moral guidance, rules, and lessons. The text is identified as Kropak 630 by the National Library of Indonesia. According to the kokolot (elder) of Cikeusik village, the people of Kanekes are not adherents to Hindu or Buddhist faiths; they follow an animistic system of belief that venerates and worships the spirits of ancestors. However, over the course of time, Sunda Wiwitan has been influenced by and incorporated Hindu and, to some extent, Islamic elements.

== Ontology and belief system ==
The highest spiritual power in Sunda Wiwitan is Sang Hyang Kersa ("The Powerful") or Nu Ngersakeun ("He Who has the Will"). This supreme being is also referred to by several names or divine titles, such as Batara Tunggal ("The One"), Batara Jagat ("Ruler of Universe"), and Batara Seda Niskala ("The Unseen"). Sang Hyang Kersa resides in the highest and most sacred realm called Buana Nyungcung (lit. 'Pointy Realm'). The Hindu gods (Brahma, Vishnu, Shiva, Indra, Yama, and so on) are considered subordinates of Sang Hyang Kersa.

According to Sunda Wiwitan ontology, the universe consists of three realms:

1. Buana Nyungcung ("The Pointy Realm" or "Peak Realm"): the uppermost realm; the abode of the supreme highest Sang Hyang Kersa.
2. Buana Panca Tengah ("The Middle World"): earth, the realm of human beings and animals, with five cardinal directions: east, west, north, south, and center/zenith.
3. Buana Larang ("The Forbidden World"): hell, the realm of demons and lowly spirits, the lowermost realm.

Between Buana Nyungcung (the peak realm) and Buana Panca Tengah (earth), there are 18 layers of realms, arranged in decreasing order of sacredness from top to bottom. The uppermost of these heavenly realms is called Bumi Suci Alam Padang, or according to Kropak 630 (Sanghyang siksakanda ng karesian), Alam Kahyangan or Mandala Hyang. This second-highest realm is the abode of Nyi Pohaci Sanghyang Asri and Sunan Ambu.

Sang Hyang Kersa created seven bataras in Sasaka Pusaka Buana (The Sacred Place on Earth). The oldest of these bataras is called Batara Cikal and is considered to be the ancestor of the Kanekes people. Other bataras ruled various locations in Sunda lands.

== Value system ==
The value system of Sunda Wiwitan is based on written and unwritten (internalized) norms. The written norms are rules and taboos that govern the way of life of adherents, while the unwritten norms are internal and individual understandings of the faith.

Sunda Wiwitan's basic and principle concepts are based on two things: Cara Ciri Manusia and Cara Ciri Bangsa. These two principles are mentioned by Sunda Wiwitan elders, yet are not explicitly mentioned in the Siksa Kanda-ng Karesian, the sacred text of Sunda Wiwitan.

Cara Ciri Manusia comprises the basic elements of human life. It consists of five fundamentals:

- Welas asih: love and compassion
- Undak usuk: social and family order
- Tata krama: behavior order and rules of conduct, such as politeness and courteousness
- Budi bahasa dan budaya: language and culture
- Wiwaha yudha naradha: "yudha", meaning war or battle. This principle refers to the essential human characteristic of always being wary or suspicious of foreign or unknown influences. This reflects an inherent conservatism and resistance to change in traditional village life. It implies that influences incompatible with tradition must be rejected.

The second concept of Cara Ciri Bangsa states that people have universals or similarities in basic human traits, yet express diversity from one individual or community to another. These elements are the source of variety among human beings:

- Rupa: looks
- Adat: customs and rules
- Bahasa: language
- Aksara: letters
- Budaya: culture

The philosophy and value system emphasizes the internal or spiritual elements of human life, indicating that humans need spiritual guidance and wisdom in their lives.

Originally Sunda Wiwitan did not incorporate many taboos or prohibitions. The core rules of conduct consist of just two elements:

- "Do not do something not to the taste of others" (something that others dislike), and do no harm to others
- "Do not do something to harm yourself"

However, to honor sacred places (Kabuyutan, Sasaka Pusaka Buana or Sasaka Domas) and follow certain traditions in rice farming, Sunda Wiwitan elaborated on many restrictions and taboos. The most numerous taboos (called Buyut by Kanekes people) are applied to those living within the most sacred place on earth—the people of Baduy Dalam that inhabit Sasaka Pusaka Buana (Sacred Place on Earth).

== Traditions and ceremonies ==
In Sunda Wiwitan tradition, prayer and ritual is performed through songs and chant of pantun Sunda and kidung dances. These ritual practices can be observed during the rice harvest ceremony and the annual new year festival called Seren Taun. These customary ceremonies are still performed annually by the more traditional Sundanese communities in Kanekes, Lebak, Banten; Cisolok, Sukabumi; Cireundeu in Cimahi; Kampung Pasir in Garut; and Cigugur, Kuningan.

Although modern Sundanese people may practice Christianity or adhere to other faiths, influences and value systems, certain elements of traditional customs, beliefs, and culture of Sunda Wiwitan still survive into contemporary times. In terms of influence on their social values and cultural mores.

== See also ==
- Animism
- Balinese Hinduism
- Hinduism in Java
- Indonesian Esoteric Buddhism
- Kejawèn
- Wawacan Sulanjana
