= Baduy =

Baduy may refer to:

- Baduy language, a Sundanese language dialect spoken in West Java, Indonesia
- Baduy people, a Sundanese community in West Java, Indonesia
- Baduy Indigenous Ban, a customary prohibition in the culture of the Baduy people in West Java, Indonesia
- Baduya, also known as Maruya, a traditional food from the Philippines
