= Angeun Lada =

Traditional Sudanese food

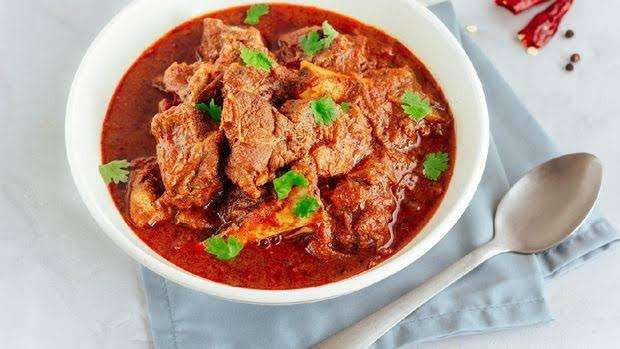
- Angeun Lada from Banten
- Course: Main course
- Place of origin: Indonesia
- Region or state: Banten
- Serving temperature: Hot
- Main ingredients: Beef tripe, Buffalo meat, Beef, or Goat meat

Angeun Lada is a traditional Bantenese food, rooted in Sundanese culture, particularly in the Pandeglang. The name Angeun Lada originates from two Sundanese words: angeun, meaning "vegetable" or "soup," and lada, meaning "spicy." Therefore, Angeun Lada means a spicy vegetable dish. This traditional food has become a mandatory dish for the community, especially in Pandeglang and during Eid celebrations. This culinary tradition is believed to have existed since the arrival of Islam in Banten. Angeun Lada is recognized as one of the Intangible Cultural Heritages of Banten and is officially registered by the Ministry of Primary and Secondary Education with the registration number 244/P/2016.

== Characteristics and taste ==
Angeun Lada is a soup dish with a spicy and savory taste, as well as rich in spices. Its broth tends to be thick and reddish in color due to the use of chili peppers. Fat and small diced pieces of meat can be seen floating in the broth. One of the main distinctive features that sets Angeun Lada apart from other soup dishes is the use of culantro, also known as Walangan. These leaves have a very strong aroma, similar to that of a rice ear bug insect, and provide a unique and refreshing flavor. Although the aroma may seem unusual for those tasting it for the first time, the scent and taste of walang are not overpowering when eaten with meat. Culantro is commonly found in the southern regions of Banten and contains essential oils. The Baduy even use culantro as a natural pesticide to repel rice pests by burning it in their field huts. The main ingredients of Angeun Lada vary, but it generally uses beef tripe, buffalo meat, beef, or goat meat. In addition, it can also be mixed with vegetables.

== Serving and celebration ==
Angeun Lada is usually served as a side dish with rice or ketupat. This dish is a mainstay menu for the Bantenese on various important occasions, such as Eid al-Fitr and Eid al-Adha celebrations, social gatherings, family reunions, weddings, and circumcision ceremonies, as well as selamatan (especially in rural areas, as its main ingredients are considered expensive). Angeun Lada can be consumed for breakfast, lunch, or dinner.

== Availability and preservation ==
Currently, Angeun Lada is rarely sold and can only be found at food stalls in certain areas around Lebak, Serang, Pandeglang, and Rangkasbitung. A popular place to taste Angeun Lada in Pandeglang is Warung Cep Udin at Sukarela Field, Pandeglang. In addition, extensive publications are being carried out to raise public awareness about Angeun Lada. Community participation is also considered very important for its preservation, such as by continuing to cook it, serve it to guests, or sell it. The Cultural Preservation Center Region VIII also organizes Angeun Lada cooking competitions, such as during the Surosowan Cultural Festival. It is hoped that Angeun Lada will become more widely known, with the slogan: “If you visit Banten, you must try Angeun Lada.”

== Bibliography ==
=== Online sources ===
- "Angeun Lada". Budaya Kita Kemendikbud.
- "Mencicipi Angeun Lada, Kuliner Unik Warisan Budaya Banten". Kumparan. 2020-03-13.
- "Culinary•Java Island Angeun Lada Khas Pandeglang". Ayo Jalan-Jalan.
- Rizkoh, Fathul (2024-06-18). "Angeun Lada, Kuliner Warisan Budaya dari Banten yang Gurih Pedas". DetikFood.
