= Rosa Elena Baduy Isaac =

Mexican politician

- Born: 20 March 1938 (age 88); Peto, Yucatán, Mexico
- Occupation: Politician
- Political party: PRI

Rosa Elena Baduy Isaac (Note: In this Mexican name, the surname is Baduy and the second or maternal family name is Isaac.) (born 20 March 1938) is a Mexican politician from the Institutional Revolutionary Party (PRI). In the 2000 general election she was elected to the Chamber of Deputies to represent the fifth district of Yucatán during the 58th Congress. She also served two terms as a local deputy in the Congress of Yucatán.
