= Sindangratu, Banten =

Sindangratu
- Location in Banten and Indonesia Sindangratu (Indonesia)
- Coordinates: 6°51′17.7444″S 106°13′27.2064″E
- Country: Indonesia
- Province: Banten
- Regency: Lebak Regency
- District: Panggarangan District
- Elevation: 1,120 ft (340 m)

Population (2010)
  - Total: 3,933
- Time zone: UTC+7 (Western Indonesia Time)

Sindangratu (Indonesian pronunciation: [sɪndaŋˈrat̪u]) is a village in Panggarangan District, Lebak Regency in Banten Province. Its population is 3933.

== Climate ==
Sindangratu has a tropical rainforest climate (Af) with heavy to very heavy rainfall year-round.

Climate data for Sindangratu
Month	Jan	Feb	Mar	Apr	May	Jun	Jul	Aug	Sep	Oct	Nov	Dec	Year
Mean daily maximum °C (°F)	29.2 (84.6)	29.4 (84.9)	30.2 (86.4)	30.2 (86.4)	30.5 (86.9)	30.3 (86.5)	30.5 (86.9)	30.6 (87.1)	31.1 (88.0)	31.1 (88.0)	30.6 (87.1)	29.9 (85.8)	30.3 (86.6)
Daily mean °C (°F)	24.8 (76.6)	24.9 (76.8)	25.4 (77.7)	25.4 (77.7)	25.6 (78.1)	25.1 (77.2)	25.0 (77.0)	24.9 (76.8)	25.4 (77.7)	25.7 (78.3)	25.5 (77.9)	25.3 (77.5)	25.3 (77.4)
Mean daily minimum °C (°F)	20.4 (68.7)	20.4 (68.7)	20.6 (69.1)	20.7 (69.3)	20.8 (69.4)	20.0 (68.0)	19.5 (67.1)	19.2 (66.6)	19.7 (67.5)	20.3 (68.5)	20.5 (68.9)	20.7 (69.3)	20.2 (68.4)
Average precipitation mm (inches)	441 (17.4)	383 (15.1)	401 (15.8)	393 (15.5)	305 (12.0)	197 (7.8)	194 (7.6)	196 (7.7)	272 (10.7)	357 (14.1)	509 (20.0)	492 (19.4)	4,140 (163.1)
Source: Climate-Data.org
