= Sogong, Banten =

Sogong
- Location in Banten and Indonesia Sogong (Indonesia)
- Coordinates: 6°48′55.7028″S 106°14′18.5388″E
- Country: Indonesia
- Province: Banten
- Regency: Lebak Regency
- District: Panggarangan District
- Elevation: 1,430 ft (436 m)

Population (2010)
  - Total: 2,590
- Time zone: UTC+7 (Western Indonesia Time)

Sogong (Indonesian pronunciation: [ˈsɔɡɔŋ]) is a village in Panggarangan District, Lebak Regency in Banten Province. Its population is 2590.

== Climate ==
Sogong has a tropical rainforest climate (Af) with heavy to very heavy rainfall year-round.

Climate data for Sogong
Month	Jan	Feb	Mar	Apr	May	Jun	Jul	Aug	Sep	Oct	Nov	Dec	Year
Mean daily maximum °C (°F)	28.7 (83.7)	28.9 (84.0)	29.7 (85.5)	29.8 (85.6)	30.0 (86.0)	29.8 (85.6)	30.0 (86.0)	30.1 (86.2)	30.6 (87.1)	30.5 (86.9)	30.1 (86.2)	29.3 (84.7)	29.8 (85.6)
Daily mean °C (°F)	24.2 (75.6)	24.3 (75.7)	24.8 (76.6)	25.0 (77.0)	25.1 (77.2)	24.6 (76.3)	24.4 (75.9)	24.2 (75.6)	24.8 (76.6)	25.0 (77.0)	25.0 (77.0)	24.6 (76.3)	24.7 (76.4)
Mean daily minimum °C (°F)	19.8 (67.6)	19.7 (67.5)	19.9 (67.8)	20.2 (68.4)	20.2 (68.4)	19.4 (66.9)	18.8 (65.8)	18.4 (65.1)	19.0 (66.2)	19.6 (67.3)	19.9 (67.8)	20.0 (68.0)	19.6 (67.2)
Average precipitation mm (inches)	438 (17.2)	381 (15.0)	399 (15.7)	419 (16.5)	321 (12.6)	212 (8.3)	204 (8.0)	215 (8.5)	307 (12.1)	376 (14.8)	516 (20.3)	490 (19.3)	4,278 (168.3)
Source: Climate-Data.org
