= Banten Sundanese =

Sundanese language spoken by Bantenese people

- Bantenese
- Basa Sunda Banten; Basa Wewengkon Banten
- Native to: Indonesia
- Region: Banten; Cilegon City; Ciwandan; Lebak Regency; Pandeglang Regency; Serang City (south part); Serang Regency (south and west parts); South Tangerang City; North Serpong; Serpong; Setu; Tangerang City (west part); Tangerang Regency (south, central, and west parts); West Java; Bogor Regency (western part); Sukabumi Regency (northwest part); Lampung; Central Lampung Regency; South Lampung Regency; Jakarta; East Jakarta; Jatinegara Kaum
- Ethnicity: Bantenese; Benteng
- Native speakers: L1: 3,350,000 (2015); Total (L1 & L2): 4,657,784
- Language family: Austronesian: Malayo-Polynesian; Malayo-Sumbawan (?); Sundanese; Banten Sundanese
- Dialects: Pandeglang; Rangkasbitung; Serang; Tangerang
- Writing system: Latin; Sunda

Official status
- Recognised minority language in: Indonesia: Banten
- Regulated by: Badan Pengembangan dan Pembinaan Bahasa

Language codes
- ISO 639-3: –
- Glottolog: bant1285
- Linguasphere: 31-MFN-ad
- Areas where Bantenese is spoken by a majority of the population Areas where Bantenese is spoken by a significant minority of the population

A Banten Sundanese speaker, recorded in Taiwan.

Banten Sundanese or Bantenese (Basa Sunda Banten or Basa Wewengkon Banten) is one of the Sundanese dialects spoken predominantly by the Bantenese — an indigenous ethnic group native to Banten — in the westernmost region of the island of Java, and in the western Bogor Regency (especially in Greater Jasinga, covering the districts of Jasinga, Cigudeg, Tenjo, Nanggung, Parung Panjang, and Sukajaya; known as Jasinga Sundanese), as well as the northwestern part of Sukabumi Regency. A variety of Bantenese is spoken by the Ciptagelar people in the Kasepuhan Ciptagelar traditional community in Cisolok district and the Kasepuhan Banten Kidul traditional community in Lebak Regency.

The regional government of Banten is currently making a significant approach to preserve this dialect through a news program entitled Beja ti Lembur, which was aired by the regional CTV Banten network in Bantenese.

== Geographic distribution ==
Unlike most other language varieties in Java, Bantenese does not employ sociolinguistic register, unlike the Priangan Sundanese spoken in the Parahyangan region which is known as the standard form of Sundanese used as a form of language of regional education.

Bantenese is classified either as a dialect of Sundanese, or a distinct language closely related to Sundanese. This language is predominantly spoken in the southern region of Banten, which are Lebak, Pandeglang, dan part of the west, central, and south Tangerang Regency, and a little in the western part of Tangerang City and South Tangerang City. In the northern Serang Regency, this language is used daily by the people of Ciomas, Jawilan, Pabuaran, Mancak, Tunjungteja, Padarincang, Cinangka, Baros, Petir, Cikeusal, Kopo, Cikande, Pamarayan, Kragilan, and parts of Anyar district. The Banten Sundanese somehow also used by Bantenese transmigrants in Central Lampung Regency and South Lampung Regency, Lampung.

== Language comparisons ==
=== Vocabulary ===
English	Bantenese	Parahyangan Sundanese
very	jasa	pisan
he/her	(i)nyana	manéhna
difficult	gati	hésé
just like	doang	siga, kawas, bangun
never before	tilok, teu ilok	tara (< teu ara)
I	aing, kami, kula	aing, kuring, abdi
you (singular)	dia, kumanéh	sia, manéh
you (plural)	daria, dararia	saria, maranéh
we	urang, araing	urang, arurang
they	dararia(na)	maranéhna
see	noong, nyeuleu	nénjo
eat	hakan, ngakan	hakan, ngahakan, baranghakan
swallow	jablog	teureuy
why	pan, kunaeun	kunaon, naha
cassava	dangdeur	sampeu
chicken	kotok	hayam
don't want	enduh, endung	embung
behind	buri	tukang
troublesome	haliwu	riweuh
clothing	jamang	baju
friend	orok	batur
blood	mokla	getih
now	kuari	ayeuna, kiwari
lazy	hulap, sangheuk	horéam

=== Phrases ===
Examples of comparison in phrases:

==== When making a statement ====
Bantenese	Jeuh aing mah endung jasa jadi doang jelma nu kedul!
Priangan Sundanese	Ah urang mah embung pisan jadi jelema nu ngedul téh
English	I really do not want to be a lazy person!

==== When inviting a female friend for a meal ====
Standard Banten	Téh, deuk ngakan teu?
Priangan Sundanese	Téh, rék baranghakan moal?
English	Sister, would you like to eat?

==== When shopping ====
Bantenese	Lamun ieu dangdeurna sabarahaan mang? Ulah mahal jasa.
Priangan Sundanese	Ari ieu sampeu sabarahaan mang? Tong mahal teuing nya.
English	How much price for this cassava uncle? Please don't be too expensive.

==== When showing ====
Bantenese	Éta di ditu dararia orok aing
Priangan Sundanese	Éta di ditu maranéhna babaturan urang
English	Those people over there are my friends.
