= María Ester Alonzo Morales =

Mexican politician

- Born: 15 January 1959 (age 67); Yucatán, Mexico
- Occupation: Politician
- Political party: PRI

María Ester Alonzo Morales (born 15 January 1959) is a Mexican politician from the Institutional Revolutionary Party (PRI).

In 2010–2012 she served as municipal president of Progreso, Yucatán. In 2012 she sat in the Chamber of Deputies representing the second district of Yucatán as the substitute of Felipe Cervera Hernández. Later, in the 2018 general election, she was elected in her own right to the Chamber of Deputies for Yucatán's second district.
