= Pikukuh Baduy =

Religious law of the Baduy people of Banten, Indonesia

Pikukuh Baduy (Badui: ᮕᮤᮊᮥᮊᮥᮂᮘᮓᮥᮚ᮪), or the Baduy customary prohibitions, is one of the Sunda Wiwitan religious ideology commonly believed or adhered by the Sunda ethnic of Baduy, which contains several religious regulations, especially regarding the Sunda-way of life. The rules are immutable; Baduy society should not change and violate the rule, because according to their belief, everything in life is already determined.

All Baduy followers Sunda Wiwitan religion must follow their religious pillars (rukun Baduy) which contains Sunda Wiwitan beliefs such as: ngukus, ngawalu, muja ngalaksa, ngalanjak, ngapundayan, and ngareksakeun sasaka pusaka. The rules must be adhered from traditional leaders called Pu'un. Pu'un must be respected and followed because Pu'un's are descendants of the Batara.

== Demographics ==
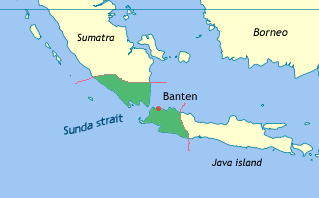
The map of Banten Sultanate.

Located in Banten there is a community with a simple life depending mainly on rice cultivation and regardless of with the times. is a closed society of the influence of foreign cultures, known as Baduy society, the or the Baduy people.

This community inhabits the slopes of mountains Kendeng with an area of approximately 5101.85 hectares. Administratively located in Village Kanekes, Leuwidamar subdistrict, Lebak District, Banten Province. Range 160 km west City Metropolitan Jakarta. the name Bedouins at first not from the Baduy people's own. South Banten residents who have religious Islam, commonly called the 'baduy' to people who do not Kanekes barefoot, riding abstinence, abstinence formal school, and like move as much as anyone in the Arab.

Baduy people, both ethnically, geographically, history, language, also in their own recognition is a Sundanese. To differentiate with other Sundanese people who reside and from outside the area Baduy, they named themselves Sunda Wiwitan. the Wiwitan Sundanese term for the Baduy, understanding not only limited to ethnic or sub-ethnic, but also includes geography, history, language, culture including customs and beliefs.

Baduy population numbered 10,879 souls, 5,465 men and women's souls 5414, based on Census data Villagers Kanekes February 28, 2008. Judging from previous years, rapid population growth of 1.79% per year. As citizens of rapid growth, changes in residential land (territorial) also extends continuously evolving. In the Regional Regulation No. 23 of 2001 by position, inside and outside, shelter residents, Baduy administratively divided into two: Baduy and Outer Baduy. In a Baduy society, amounting to 1,053 souls occupy land inhabited three villages: Cikeusik, Cikertawa and Cibeo. Outer Baduy people who numbered 9,826 souls occupy land that was inhabited 57 villages and 5 scene of (splitting the village). In the previous year, 2003 Outer Baduy is known that only has 45 villages and 6 scene of.

== Distribution ==
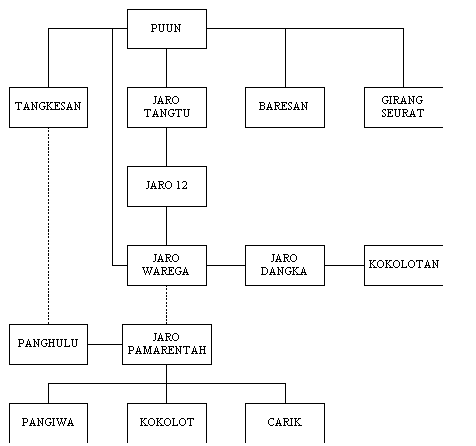
Baduy structural governance.

Baduy are divided into three groups, namely Tangtu, panamping and dangka. Nevertheless, grouping is often used by the general public only two, namely Baduy (equivalent to tangtu) and Baduy Affairs (equivalent to panamping and dangka).

== Wiwitan Sundanese way of life ==
Wiwitan Sundanese adheres to pikukuh and buyut, a customary rules and prohibition. Pikukuh are the rules and the way of life ancestor (karuhun) lived. This contains Baduy's religious orientation, concepts and manner. Buyut are taboo and prohibition on pikukuh. Buyut is not codified in the form of text, but instead applied as Wiwitan Sundanese interacts with each other, the environment and Sang Hyang Kersa. Baduy's pikukuh and buyut remains unchanged, and inherited from their ancestors. Buyut and Pikukuh of the Baduy community as follows:

buyut nu dititipkeun ka puun (buyut were entrusted to pu'un)

nagara satelung puluh telu (thirty-three countries)

bangsawan sawidak lima (river sixty-five)

pancer salawe nagara (center of twenty-five states)

gugung teu meunang dilebur (mountain should not be destroyed)

lebak teu meunang diruksak (valley should not be tampered with)

larangan teu meunang ditempak (prohibition should not be violated)

buyut teu meunang dirobah (buyut can not be changed)

lojor teu meunang dipotong (length can not be cut)

pondok teu meunang disambung (short not to be connected)

nu lain kudu dilainkeun (Another be eliminated)

nu ulah kudu diulahken (the other must be considered another)

nu enya kudu dienyakeun (which really should be justified)

mipit kudu amit (taking must say good-bye)

ngala kudu menta (taking must ask)

ngeduk cikur kudu mihatur (To take aromatic ginger (kencur), must notify the owner)

nyokel jahe kudu micarek (To unearth ginger, must notify the owner)

ngagedag kudu bewara (To shake the tree so the fruit fell, must notify the owner)

nyaur kudu diukur (speak wisely)

nyabda kudu diunggang (Think before speak so that it does not offend)

ulah ngomomg sageto-geto (do not speak carelessly)

ulah lemek sadaek-daek (do not speak sloppily)

ulah mailng papanjingan (do not steal despite shortcomings)

ulah jinah papacangan (do not fornicate and date)

kudu ngadek sacekna, nilas saplasna (idiom: do not exaggerate and redact while speaking)

akibatna (consequently)

matak burung jadi ratu (could fail to be a leader)

matak edan jadi menak (can be crazy to be an aristocrat)

matak pupul pengaruh (can be lost influence)

matak hambar komara (could be lost authority)

matak teu mahi juritan (could lose a fight)

matak teu jaya perang (could lose war)

matak eleh jajaten (can be lost courage)

matak eleh kasakten (can be lost magic) Baduy's Pikukuh also regulates governance of Baduy traditional institutions, which led by three Pu'un. The three top leaders are taken from three villages in the Inner Baduy: Cibeo, Cikeusik and Cikartawana. Pu'un is the key person that has karuhun ancestor, their job is to protect earth's spirit and to make sure the village member adheres and follow the Pikukuh.

In addition, Baduy has customary provisions and guidelines that must be adhered. The contents of Baduy customary prohibitions are:

- Changing the way water flow like making a fish pond or drainage is prohibited;
- Prohibited from changing the shape of the land such as wells or land leveling;
- No entry to the sacred forest (leuweung titipan) for cutting down a tree;
- Prohibited use of chemical technology;
- Prohibited plantation for farming;
- Forbidden to keep four-legged animals such as goats and buffalo;
- Indiscriminate farming is banned;
- Sloppy dressing is prohibited.

Pikukuh and buyut are orally told to all the Baduy people in every traditional ceremonies.

== See also ==
- Agama Hindu Dharma
- Kejawèn
