= Bantenese people =

Sundanese ethnic group

ᮅᮛᮀ ᮝᮠᮔ᮪ᮒᮨᮔ᮪ Urang Wahanten
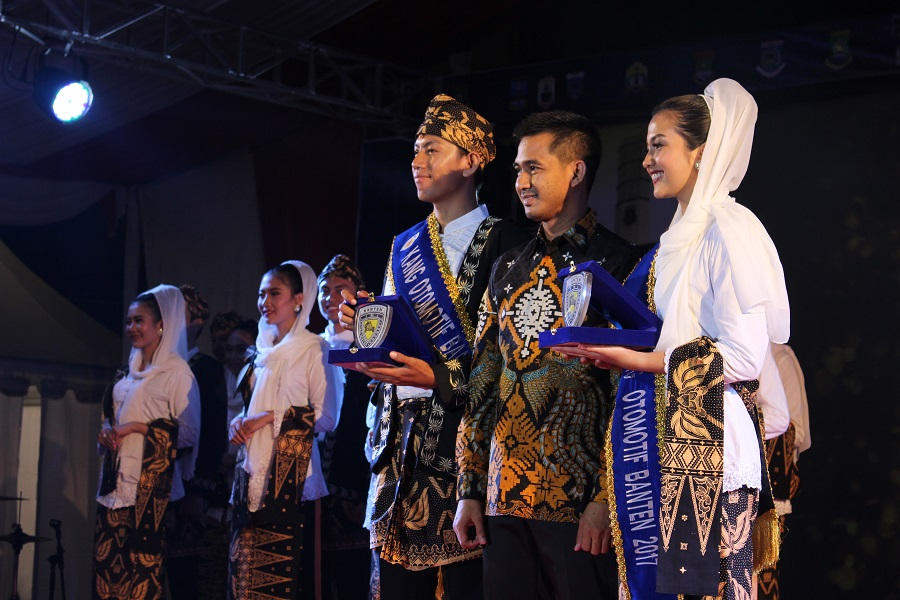
- 2017 Kang Nong Banten

Total population
- 4,657,784 (2010 census)

Regions with significant populations
- Indonesia (Banten)

Languages
- Native; Bantenese • Sundanese • Indonesian • Arabic (religious only)

Religion
- Predominantly • Sunni Islam (99.85%); Minorities • Christians (Protestant and Roman Catholic) • Hindu • Buddhist • Confucianism • Other (0.15%)

Related ethnic groups
- Austronesian peoples: Baduy; Sundanese; Betawi; Cirebonese; Benteng Chinese

The Bantenese (Indonesian: Orang Banten/Orang Sunda Banten; Sundanese: ᮅᮛᮀ ᮝᮠᮔ᮪ᮒᮨᮔ᮪, romanized: Urang Wahanten) are an indigenous Sundanese sub-ethnic group native to Banten in the westernmost part of Java island, Indonesia. The area of Banten province corresponds more or less with the area of the former Banten Sultanate, a Bantenese nation state that preceded Indonesia. In his book "The Sultanate of Banten", Guillot Claude writes on page 35: “These estates, owned by the Bantenese of Chinese descent, were concentrated around the village of Kelapadua.” Most of Bantenese are Sunni Muslim. The Bantenese speak the Sundanese-Banten dialect, a variety of the Sundanese language which does not have a general linguistic register, this language is called Basa Sunda Banten (Sundanese language of Banten).

== 2010 Population Census ==
According to the 2010 Population Census carried out by the Central Bureau of Statistics Indonesia, the Bantenese people along with the Baduy people are categorized under the Native Bantenese people with a total of 4,657,784 people.

== Origins ==
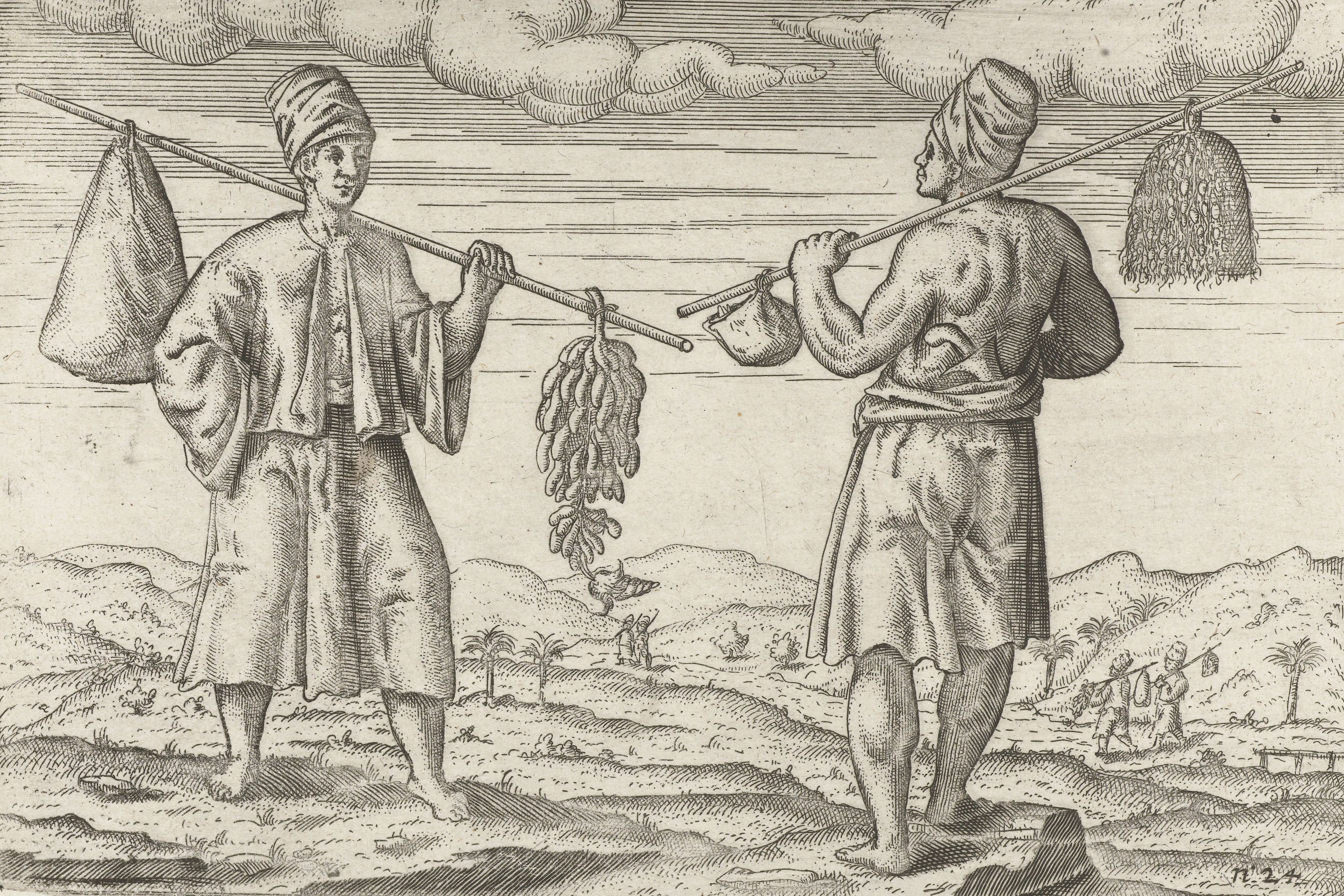
Bantenese people before the establishment of Banten Sultanate.

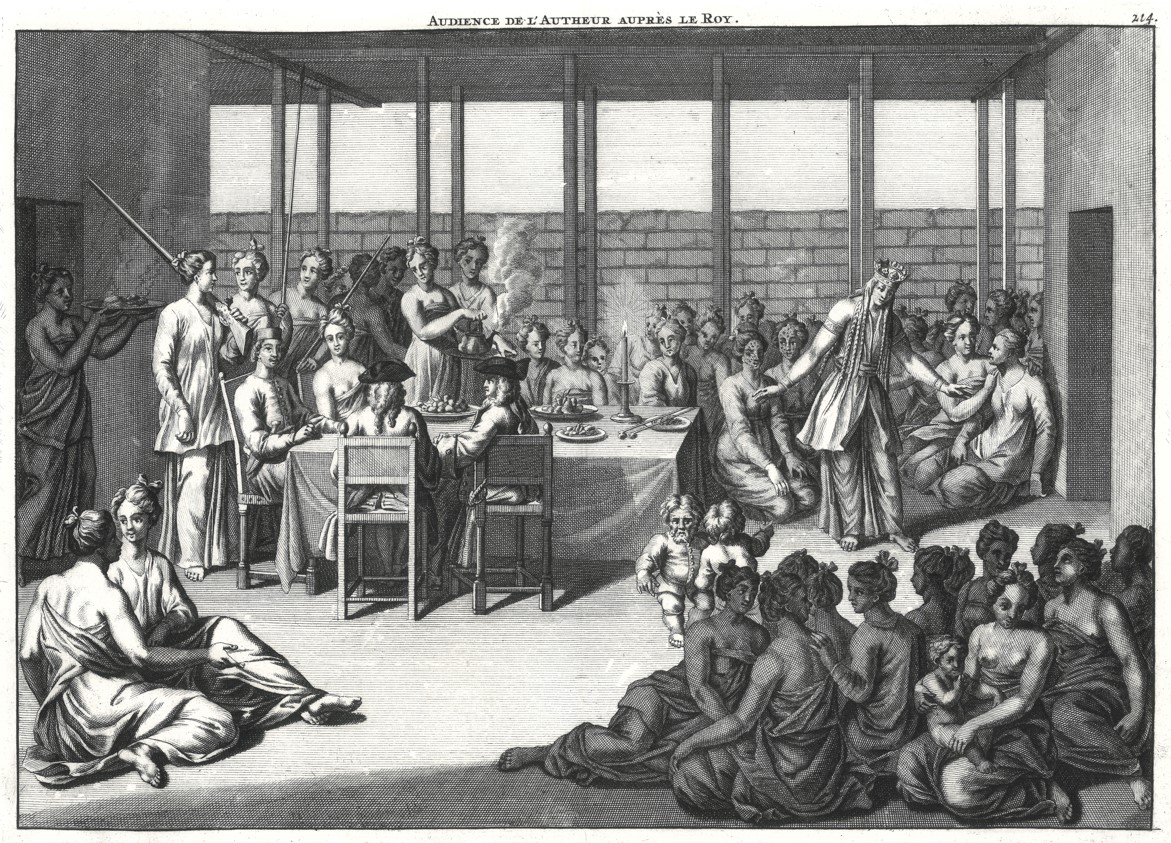
Cornelis de Bruijn at the Banten court, 1711.

The origins of the Bantenese people; which are closely related to the Banten Sultanate, are different from the Cirebonese people who are not part of the Sundanese people or the Javanese people (unless it is from the result of a mixture of two major cultures, namely Sundanese and Javanese). The Bantenese and Baduy people (Kanekes) were historically part of the Sundanese, and trace their history to the Banten Sultanate (Bantam Residency area after the abolition and annexation by the Dutch East Indies).

== Language ==
Unlike any other native languages in Java island, the Bantenese language does not have a recognized linguistic register in general, and differs from the Priangan dialect spoken in the Parahyangan region. Due to its Priangan dialect, the Bantenese language somewhat seen as the sister language of Sundanese that is still closely related to the Old Sundanese language.

The Bantenese language is categorized or classified under the Sundanesic language family. This language is predominantly spoken in the southern region of Banten, which are Lebak (including Cilangkahan region), and Pandeglang Regency (including Caringin and Cibaliung). In the northern Serang Regency, this language is used daily by the people of Ciomas, Pabuaran, Padarincang, Cinangka, Baros, Petir, Cikeusal, Kopo, Cikande, Pamarayan and parts of Anyar subdistrict. The Banten Sundanese also used by Bantenese transmigrants in Central Lampung Regency and South Lampung Regency, Lampung.

In Serang Regency, Bantenese language is used daily by the people of Anyar, Mancak, Waringinkurung, Taktakan, Cipocok Jaya, Walantaka, as well as Kragilan district. This language also used in some parts of Tangerang Regency, especially in its southern, southwestern, midwest and northern parts, as well as in cities of Tangerang and South Tangerang.

== Religion ==
Those who considered themselves as Bantenese are generally practicing Muslims, which is due to being inseparable from a strong Islamic cultural background. This case is also closely related to the history of Banten Sultanate as one of the largest Islamic kingdom in the island of Java. Besides that, the artistry in Banten region also portrays Islamic activities of its society, such as art Rampak Bedug from Pandeglang Regency. Even so, Banten Province is a multi-ethnic society consisting of various ethnics and religions. Adherents of other faiths from various non-indigenous ethnic groups live alongside each other peacefully in this region, such as the Benteng Chinese community in Tangerang and the Baduy people that practices Sunda Wiwitan in Kanekes, Leuwidamar, Lebak Regency.

== Culture ==
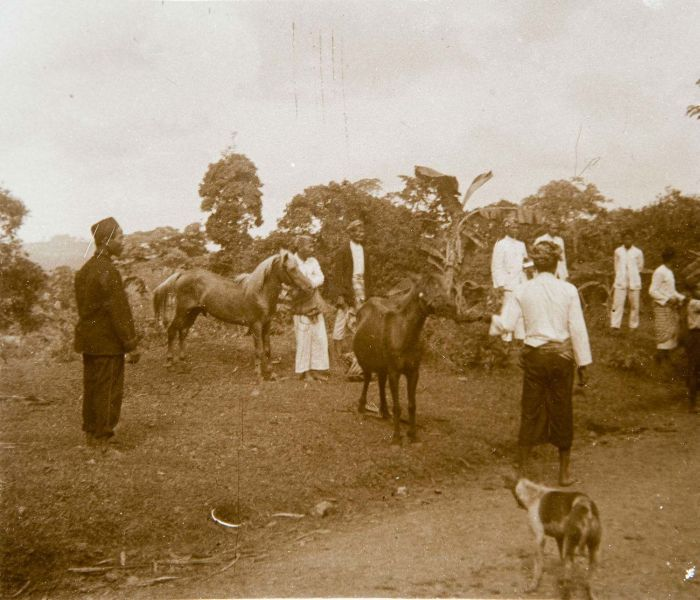
Bantenese men with horses in the Bantam Residency (present day, Banten Province), circa 1915-1926.

The land of Sunda in Banten is rich in culture and customs, and one of the most dominant is Banten culture and customs which is different from Sundanese culture in West Java.

=== Art forms ===
The cultural distinctiveness of the Bantenese community among other is Pencak Silat martial arts, Debus, Rudad, Umbruk, Saman dance (Dzikir Saman), Tari topeng, Dog-dog, Angklung Gubrag, Rampak Bedug, Walijamaliha dance, Silat Pandeglang dance, Palingtung, Lojor, Beluk and so on.

=== Historical landmarks ===
In addition, there are also relics of ancestral heritage, and among them are such as the Great Mosque of Banten, the Sacred Long Mausoleum and many more.

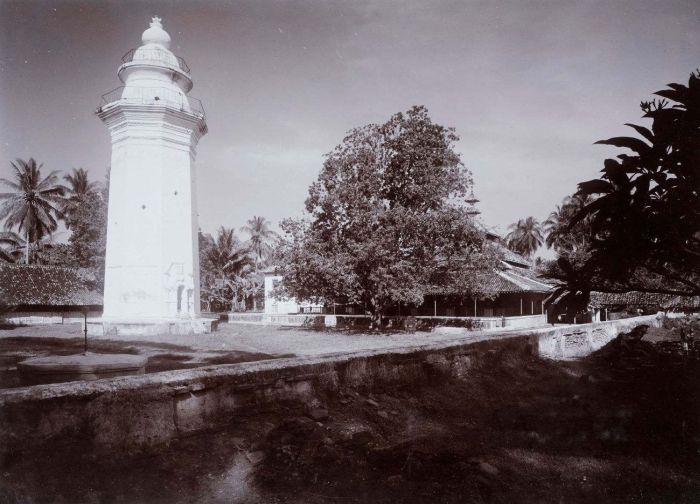
Great Mosque of Banten and its minaret, circa 1915-1926.

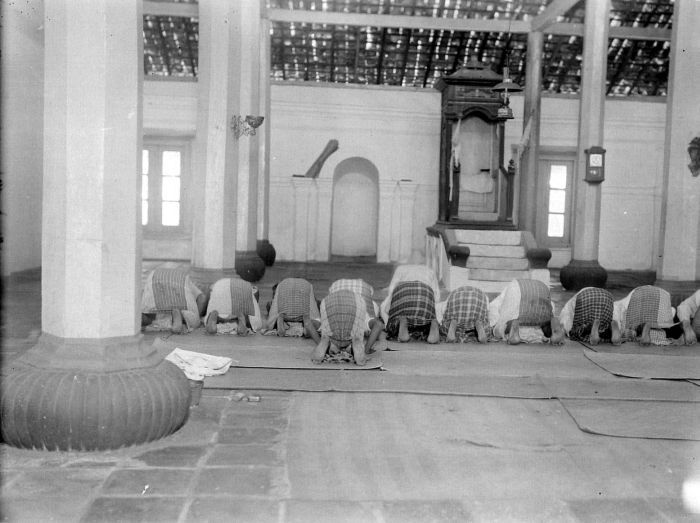
The people are prostrate in Banten mosque, 1933.

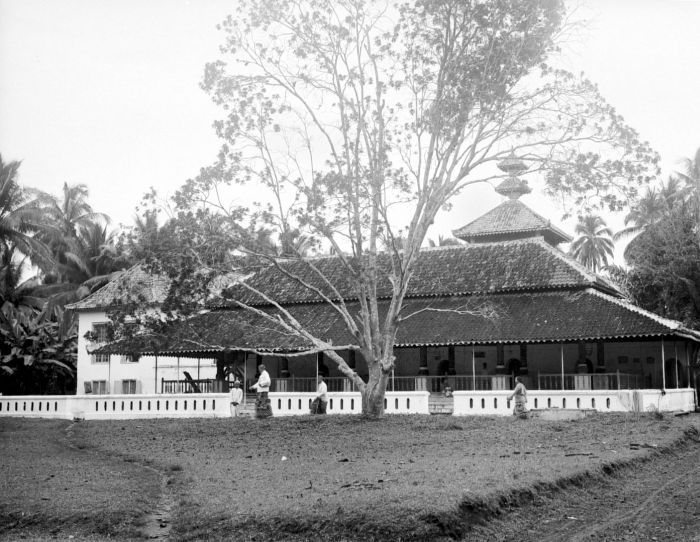
Outside of the mosque, 1933.

=== Culinary ===
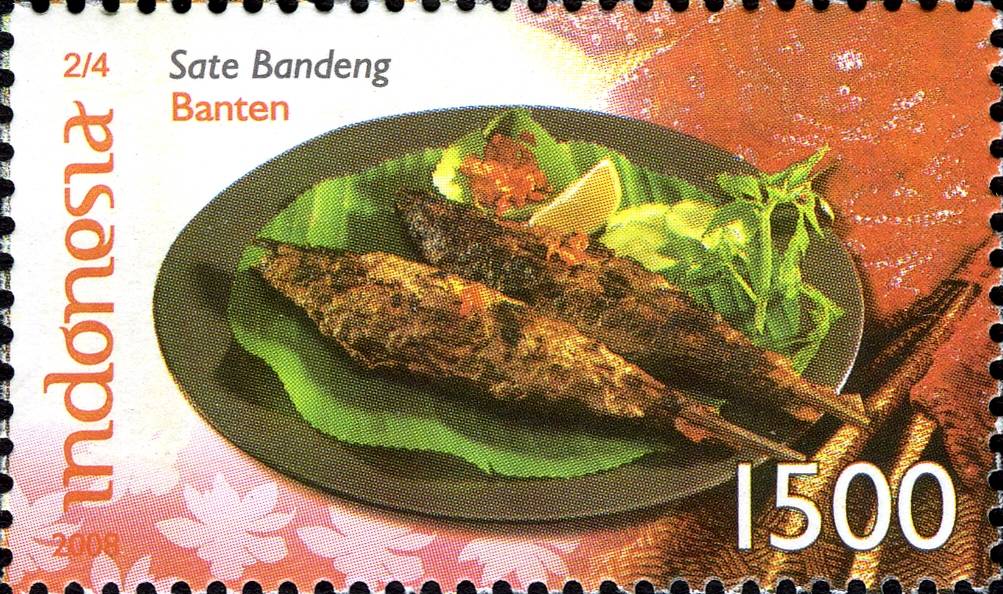
Sate Bandeng commemorated in an Indonesian stamp.

Bantenese culinary includes Sate Bandeng, Rabeg Banten, Pasung Beureum, Ketan Bintul, Nasi Belut, Kue Cucur, Angeun Lada, Balok Menes, Sate Bebek Cibeber, Emping Menes and others.

=== Bantenese batik textile ===
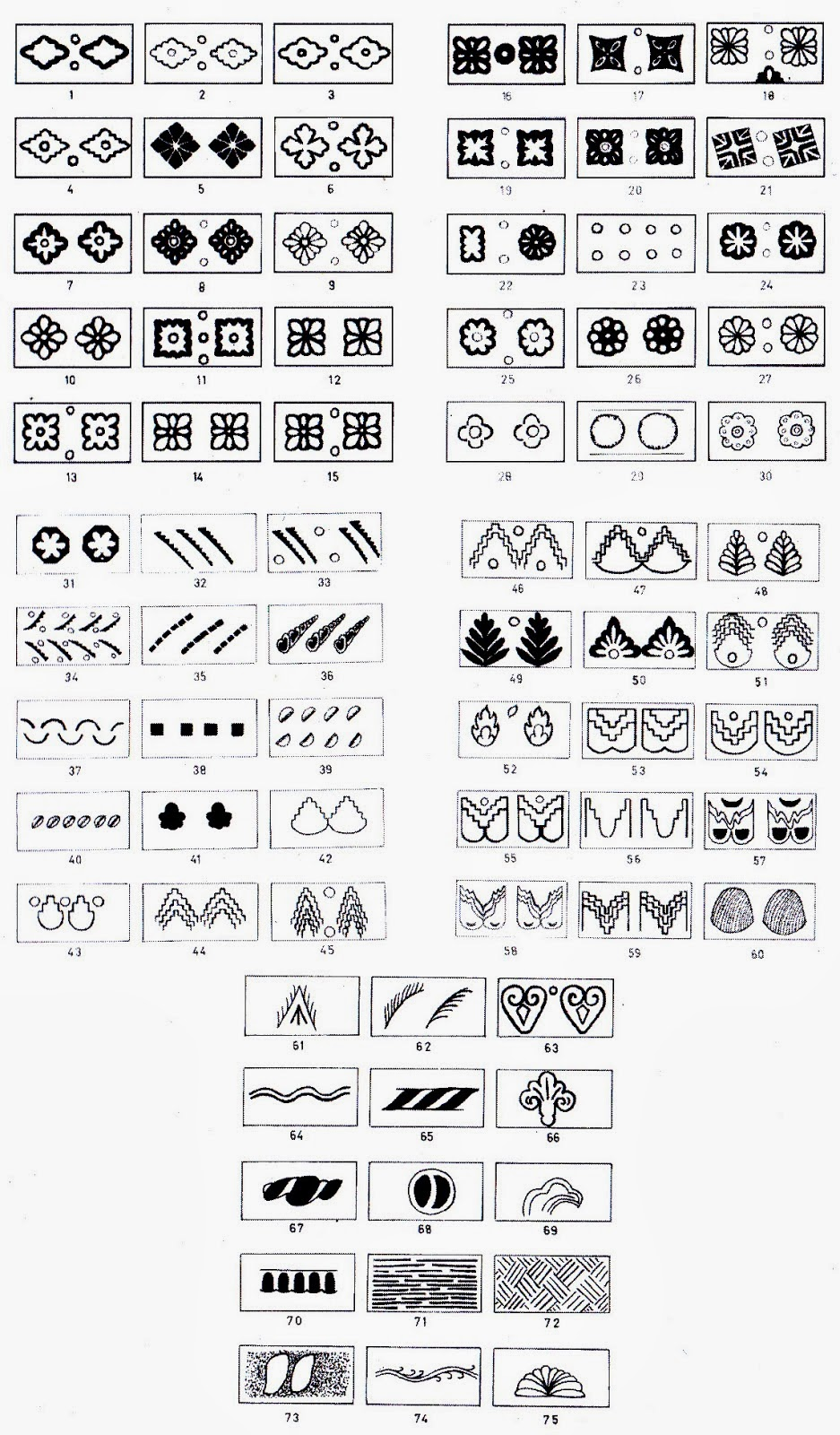
75 decorative designs from Banten that have been reconstructed by the National Archaeology based on artifacts from the Banten Sultanate.

The pattern and motifs of Bantenese batik is the illumination of decorative design that have been studied by the Banten government as part of the framework of rediscovering ornamental motifs from traditional Bantenese houses. These decorative designs came about as a result of the reconstructions from the excavations made by the National Archaeology and the Faculty of Literature, Universitas Indonesia since 1976. The decorative designs are then decided by the Banten governor in 2003.

Ever since its patenting in 2003, Bantenese batik has undergone a long process until it was finally recognized globally. The Bantenese batik was patented after it was predicated through studies done in Malaysia, Singapore and then followed by another 62 countries. In fact, Bantenese batik was the first batik with patent rights in the UNESCO.

Bantenese batik possesses the storytelling identity and its own uniqueness in comparison to other batiks. Several of its motifs are adopted from historical artifacts. Grayish colors can be found in every motifs, which is supposed to reflect the Banten community. All of the batik contains philosophical meaning.

Names of the Bantenese batik motifs are taken from the toponym of ancient village names, the title of nobles or sultan and the name of the court palace of Banten. Even the patterns are synonymous with historical stories that contain meaningful philosophies and on the motifs bears intellectual meaning for the wearer of Bantenese batik materials and clothing.

==== Philosophy behind Bantenese batik motifs ====
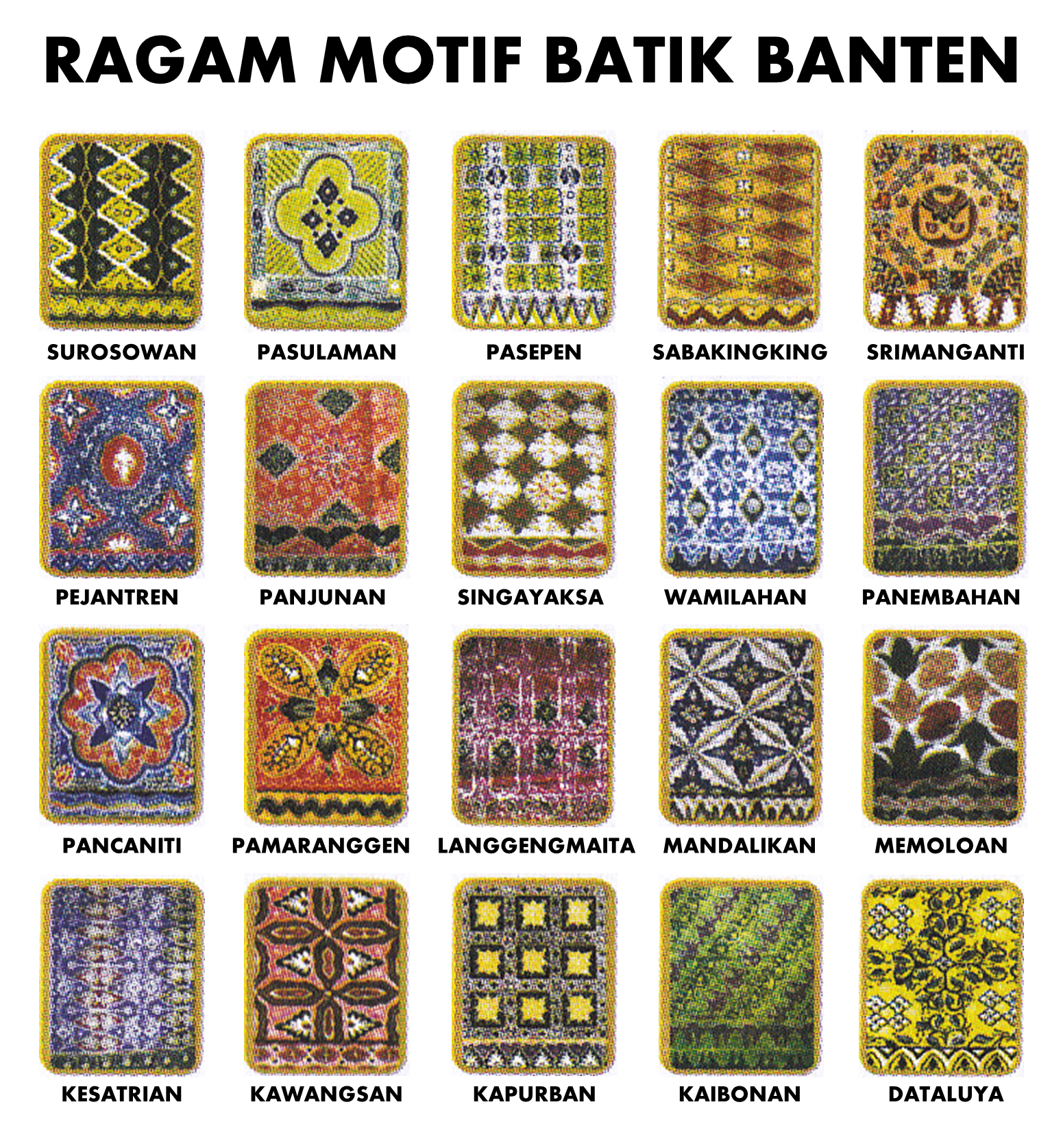
Decorative designs of the Bantenese batik.

- Surosowan motif: Surosowan is the name of the spatial layout facing the king / sultan of the Banten Sultanate.
- Pasulamam motif: Pasulaman is the name of the place of the embroidery craftsmen within the Banten Sultanate.
- Pasepen motif: Pasepen is the name of the place in the palace where Sultan Maulana Hasanuddin of Banten would meditate in the Banten Sultanate.
- Sebakingking motif: Sebakingking is the name of Panembahan Sultan Maulana Hasanuddin of Banten's title in the spreading of the Islamic religion.
- Srimanganti motif: Srimanganti is the name of the place where the commoner's porch connects the Banten Sultanate's pendopo for the king / sultan waiting area.
- Pejantren motif: Pesantren is the name of the place where weaving craftsmen in Banten region are situated.
- Panjunan motif: Panjunan is the name of a village where pottery and ceramic craftsmen are found in the Banten Sultanate.
- Singayaksa motif: Singayaksa is the name of a place where Sultan Maulana Hasanuddin of Banten performs Salat al-Istikharah, asking for God's guidance in establishing the palace.
- Wamilahan motif: Wamilahan is the name of a village neighboring the palace where bamboo and mats craftsmen are situated.
- Panembahan motif: Panembahan is the name of Sultan Maulana Hasanuddin of Banten's title in nation planning on the Banten Sultanate palace' achievements.
- Pancaniti motif: Pancaniti is the name of the place where Sultan Maulana Hasanuddin of Banten watches his soldiers training in the field.
- Pamaranggen motif: Pamaranggen is the name of the place neighboring the Banten Sultanate where the keris and keris adornment craftsmen are found.
- Langenmaita motif: Langenmaita is the name of the place where happiness is anchored in the ocean of love with a yacht or dock.
- Mandalikan motif: Mandalikan is the name of the title given to Prince Arya Mandalika for the spreading of the Islamic religion.
- Memoloan motif: Memoloan is the name of a roofing building construction on minarets and on Banten Sultanate's pendopo.
- Kesatriaan motif: Kesatriaan is the name of a village neighboring the Banten Sultanate where religious learning are taught in the boarding school.
- Kawangsan motif: Kawangsan is the name of the title given to Prince Wangsa for the spreading of Islam.
- Kapurban motif: Kapurban is the name of the title given to the Prince Purba for the spreading of Islam.
- Kaibon motif: Kaibonan is the name of a walled building that surrounds the Royal Palace of Banten.
- Datulaya motif: Datulaya is the name of Sultan Maulana Hasanuddin of Banten and his family's residence in the Banten Sultanate.

== Notable people ==
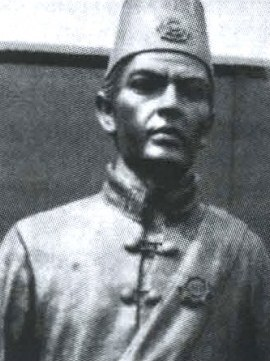
Sultan Ageng Tirtayasa, ruler of Banten Sultanate and acknowledged as a national hero of Indonesia

- Ageng Tirtayasa of Banten, a Sultan of Banten and a National Hero of Indonesia
- Ratu Atut Chosiyah, governor of Banten
- Bing Slamet, comedian, actor, singer and composer
- Eman Sulaeman, historian and actor
- Idrus Nasir Djajadiningrat, an Indonesian diplomat and military veteran
- Ma'ruf Amin, former vice president of Indonesia and religious scholar
- Maria Ulfah Santoso, a member of Committee for Preparatory Work for Independence and a minister
- Maulana Hasanuddin of Banten, the first ruler of Banten Sultanate
- Misbach Yusa Biran, film director
- Slamet Rahardjo, actor
- Syafruddin Prawiranegara, leader of the rebellion Pemerintahan Revolusioner Republik Indonesia and a National Hero of Indonesia
- Tubagus Ahmad Chatib al-Bantani, a religious scholar and a National Hero of Indonesia
- Muhammad Saleh Benten, Saudi Arabian minister of Bantenese descent
