= Sobang =

District in Banten, Indonesia

- District
- Interactive map of Sobang
- Coordinates: 6°33′47.79907″S 105°45′19.78218″E
- Country: Indonesia
- Province: Banten
- Regency: Lebak Regency

Area
  - Total: 105.80 km^{2} (40.85 sq mi)

Population (2023)
  - Total: 33,215
  - Density: 313.94/km^{2} (813.10/sq mi)
- Time zone: UTC+07:00 (Western Indonesia Time)
- Postal code: 42315 - 42318

Sobang is an administrative district (kecamatan) in Lebak Regency, Banten, Indonesia.
