= Martín Enrique Castillo Ruz =

Mexican politician (born 1970)

- Born: 23 January 1970 (age 56); Umán, Yucatán, Mexico
- Occupation: Politician
- Political party: PRI

Martín Enrique Castillo Ruz (born 23 January 1970) is a Mexican politician from the Institutional Revolutionary Party (PRI). In the 2009 mid-terms he was elected to the Chamber of Deputies to represent the fifth district of Yucatán during the 61st Congress.
