= Sajira =

District in Banten, Indonesia

- District
- Interactive map of Sajira
- Coordinates: 6°29′30″S 106°21′16″E
- Country: Indonesia
- Province: Banten
- Regency: Lebak Regency

Area
  - Total: 112.26 km^{2} (43.34 sq mi)

Population (2020)
  - Total: 55,832
  - Density: 497.35/km^{2} (1,288.1/sq mi)
- Time zone: UTC+7 (WIB)
- Postal code: 42371

Sajira is an administrative district (kecamatan) in Lebak Regency, Banten, Indonesia.
