= Gerardo Escaroz Soler =

Mexican politician (born 1957)

- Born: 12 August 1957 (age 68); Mérida, Yucatán, Mexico
- Education: Universidad Autónoma de Yucatán
- Occupation: Politician
- Political party: PAN

Gerardo Antonio Escaroz Soler (born 12 August 1957) is a Mexican politician from the National Action Party (PAN). In the 2006 general election he was elected to the Chamber of Deputies to represent the fifth district of Yucatán during the 60th Congress.
