= 2nd federal electoral district of Yucatán =

Federal electoral district of Mexico

Yucatán's 2nd
- Electoral district of the Chamber of Deputies of Mexico

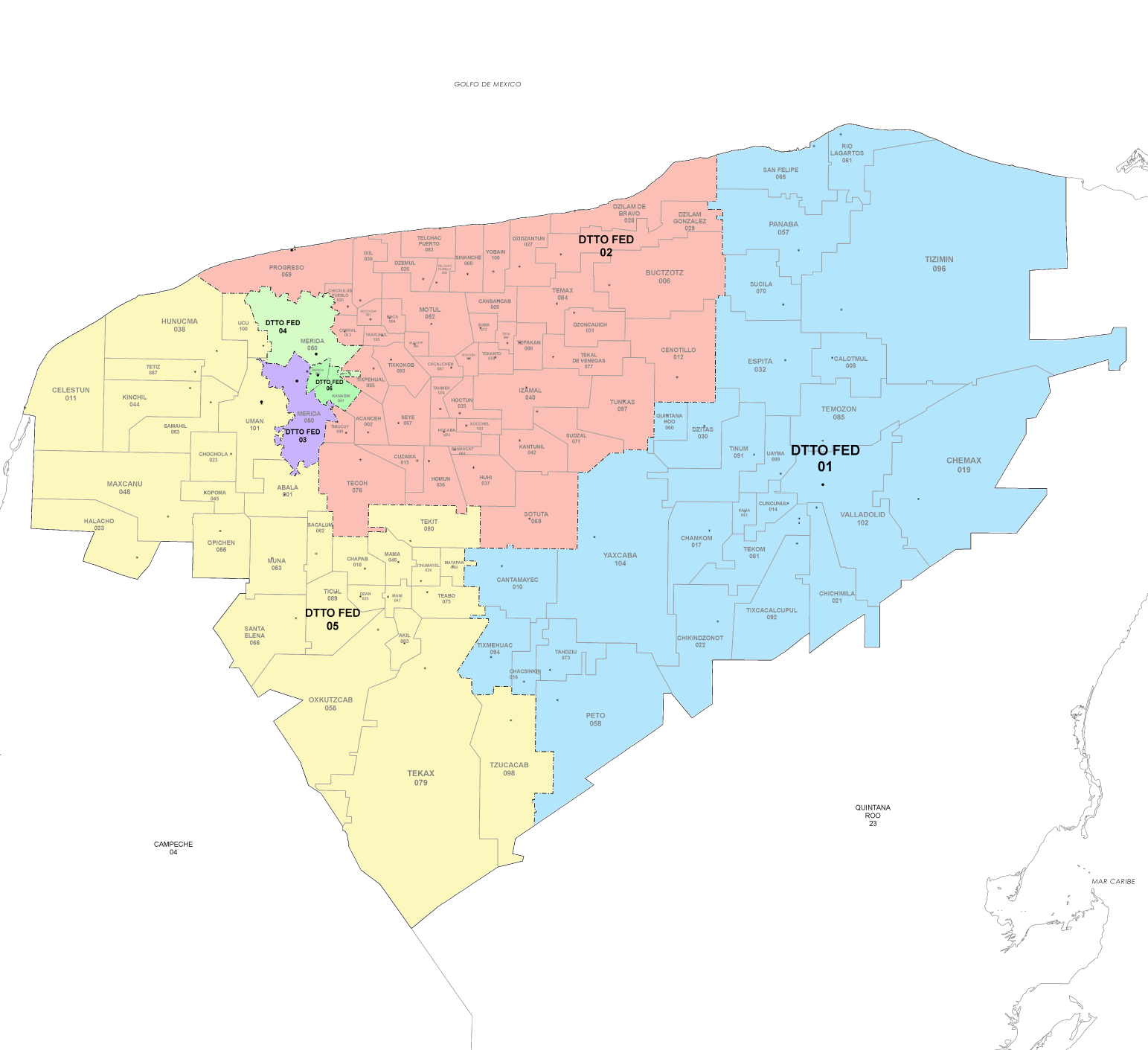
- 2nd district since 2023

Incumbent
- Member: Jorge Luis Sánchez Reyes
- Party: ▌Morena
- Congress: 66th (2024–2027)

District
- State: Yucatán
- Head town: Progreso
- Coordinates: 21°16′N 89°40′W
- Covers: 48 municipalities: Acanceh, Baca, Bokobá, Buctzotz, Cacalchén, Cansahcab, Cenotillo, Chicxulub Pueblo, Conkal, Cuzamá, Dzemul, Dzidzantún, Dzilam de Bravo, Dzilam González, Dzoncauich, Hocabá, Hoctún, Homún, Huhí, Ixil, Izamal, Kantunil, Mocochá, Motul, Muxupip, Progreso, Sanahcat, Seyé, Sinanché, Sotuta, Sudzal, Suma, Tahmek, Tecoh, Tekal de Venegas, Tekantó, Telchac Pueblo, Telchac Puerto, Temax, Tepakán, Teya, Timucuy, Tixkokob, Tixpéhual, Tunkás, Xocchel, Yaxkukul, Yobaín
- PR region: Third
- Precincts: 248
- Population: 392,305 (2020 census)
- Indigenous: Yes (76%)

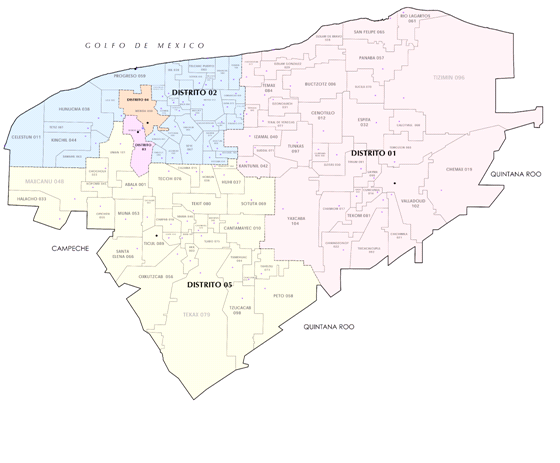
Yucatán under the 2017–2022 districting plan

2nd district in 2005–2017

The 2nd federal electoral district of Yucatán (Spanish: Distrito electoral federal 02 de Yucatán) is one of the 300 electoral districts into which Mexico is divided for elections to the federal Chamber of Deputies and one of six such districts in the state of Yucatán.

It elects one deputy to the lower house of Congress for each three-year legislative period by means of the first-past-the-post system. Votes cast in the district also count towards the calculation of proportional representation ("plurinominal") deputies elected from the third region.

The current member for the district, elected in the 2024 general election, is Jorge Luis Sánchez Reyes of the National Regeneration Movement (Morena).

== District territory ==
Yucatán gained a congressional seat in the 2023 redistricting process carried out by the National Electoral Institute (INE). Under the new districting plan, which will be used for the 2024, 2027 and 2030 federal elections, the reconfigured 2nd district is located in the north-central part of the state. It comprises 248 electoral precincts (secciones electorales) across 48 municipalities:

- Acanceh, Baca, Bokobá, Buctzotz, Cacalchén, Cansahcab, Cenotillo, Chicxulub Pueblo, Conkal, Cuzamá, Dzemul, Dzidzantún, Dzilam de Bravo, Dzilam González, Dzoncauich, Hocabá, Hoctún, Homún, Huhí, Ixil, Izamal, Kantunil, Mocochá, Motul, Muxupip, Progreso, Sanahcat, Seyé, Sinanché, Sotuta, Sudzal, Suma, Tahmek, Tecoh, Tekal de Venegas, Tekantó, Telchac Pueblo, Telchac Puerto, Temax, Tepakán, Teya, Timucuy, Tixkokob, Tixpéhual, Tunkás, Xocchel, Yaxkukul and Yobaín.

The head town (cabecera distrital), where results from individual polling stations are gathered together and tallied, is the port city of Progreso. The district had a population of 392,305 in the 2020 census, and with Indigenous and Afrodescendent inhabitants accounting for over 76% of that total, Yucatán's 2nd – like all the state's electoral districts, both local and federal – is classified by the INE as an indigenous district. (Note: Population figure indicates total inhabitants, not voters. The INE deems any local or federal electoral district where Indigenous or Afrodescendent inhabitants number 40% or more of the population to be an indigenous district.)

== Previous districting schemes ==
Evolution of electoral district numbers
	1974	1978	1996	2005	2017	2023
Yucatán	3	4	5	5	5	6
Chamber of Deputies	196	300				

2017–2022

Between 1996 and 2022, Yucatán had five federal electoral districts. Under the 2017 scheme, the 2nd district's head town was at Progreso and it covered 36 municipalities in the north-west of the state:
- Acanceh, Baca, Bokobá, Cacalchén, Cansahcab, Celestún, Chicxulub Pueblo, Conkal, Dzemul, Hocabá, Hoctún, Hunucma, Ixil, Kanasín, Kinchil, Mocochá, Motul, Muxupip, Progreso, Samahil, Seyé, Sinanché, Suma, Tahmek, Tekantó, Telchac Pueblo, Telchac Puerto, Tetiz, Teya, Timucuy, Tixkokob, Tixpéhual, Ucú, Xocchel, Yaxkukul and Yobaín.

2005–2017

Under the 2005 districting scheme, the district covered 39 municipalities in the centre and north of the state and had its head town at Progreso.

1996–2005

Between 1996 and 2005, the district's head town was at Progreso and it covered 33 municipalities in the north-west region of the state.

1978–1996

The districting scheme in force from 1978 to 1996 was the result of the 1977 electoral reforms, which increased the number of single-member seats in the Chamber of Deputies from 196 to 300. Under that plan, Yucatán's district allocation rose from three to four. The 2nd district had its head town at Ticul, some 100 km south of the state capital, Mérida, and it covered 39 municipalities in that region of the state.

== Deputies returned to Congress ==
(Mexico) National parties
- Current
- PAN
- PRI
- PT
- PVEM
- MC
- Morena
- PAZ
- Somos
- Defunct or local only
- PLM
- PNR
- PRM
- PNM
- PP
- PPS
- PARM
- PFCRN
- CON
- PANAL
- PSD
- PES
- PES
- PRD

Yucatán's 2nd district
Election	Deputy	Party	Term	Legislature
1973	Hernán Morales Medina	Institutional Revolutionary Party	1973–1976	49th Congress
1976	Rubén Calderón Cecilio	Institutional Revolutionary Party	1976–1979	50th Congress
1979	Gonzalo Navarro Báez	Institutional Revolutionary Party	1979–1982	51st Congress
1982	José Pacheco Durán	Institutional Revolutionary Party	1982–1985	52nd Congress
1985	José Nerio Torres Ortiz	Institutional Revolutionary Party	1985–1988	53rd Congress
1988	Rubén Calderón Cecilio	Institutional Revolutionary Party	1988–1991	54th Congress
1991	Fernando Romero Ayuso	Institutional Revolutionary Party	1991–1994	55th Congress
1994	Rubén Calderón Cecilio	Institutional Revolutionary Party	1994–1997	56th Congress
1997	Wilbert Chi Góngora	Institutional Revolutionary Party	1997–2000	57th Congress
2000	José Feliciano Moo y Can	Institutional Revolutionary Party	2000–2003	58th Congress
2003	Ivonne Ortega Pacheco	Institutional Revolutionary Party	2003–2006	59th Congress
2006	José Luis Blanco Pajón	Institutional Revolutionary Party	2006–2009	60th Congress
2009	Felipe Cervera Hernández (Note: Resigned his seat on 20 January 2012.); María Ester Alonzo Morales	Institutional Revolutionary Party	2009–2012; 2012	61st Congress
2012	María del Carmen Ordaz Martínez	Institutional Revolutionary Party	2012–2015	62nd Congress
2015	Lucely Alpizar Carrillo	Institutional Revolutionary Party	2015–2018	63rd Congress
2018	María Ester Alonzo Morales	Institutional Revolutionary Party	2018–2021	64th Congress
2021	Mario Xavier Peraza Ramírez	Ecologist Green Party of Mexico	2021–2024	65th Congress
2024	Jorge Luis Sánchez Reyes	National Regeneration Movement	2024–2027	66th Congress

== Presidential elections ==
Yucatán's 2nd district
Election	District won by	Party or coalition	%
2018	Andrés Manuel López Obrador	Juntos Haremos Historia	37.2962
2024	Claudia Sheinbaum Pardo	Sigamos Haciendo Historia	65.3363
