= Baduy people =

Ethnic group in Indonesia

Urang Baduy/Urang Kanékés ᮅᮛᮀ ᮘᮓᮥᮚ᮪/ᮅᮛᮀ ᮊᮔᮦᮊᮦᮞ᮪
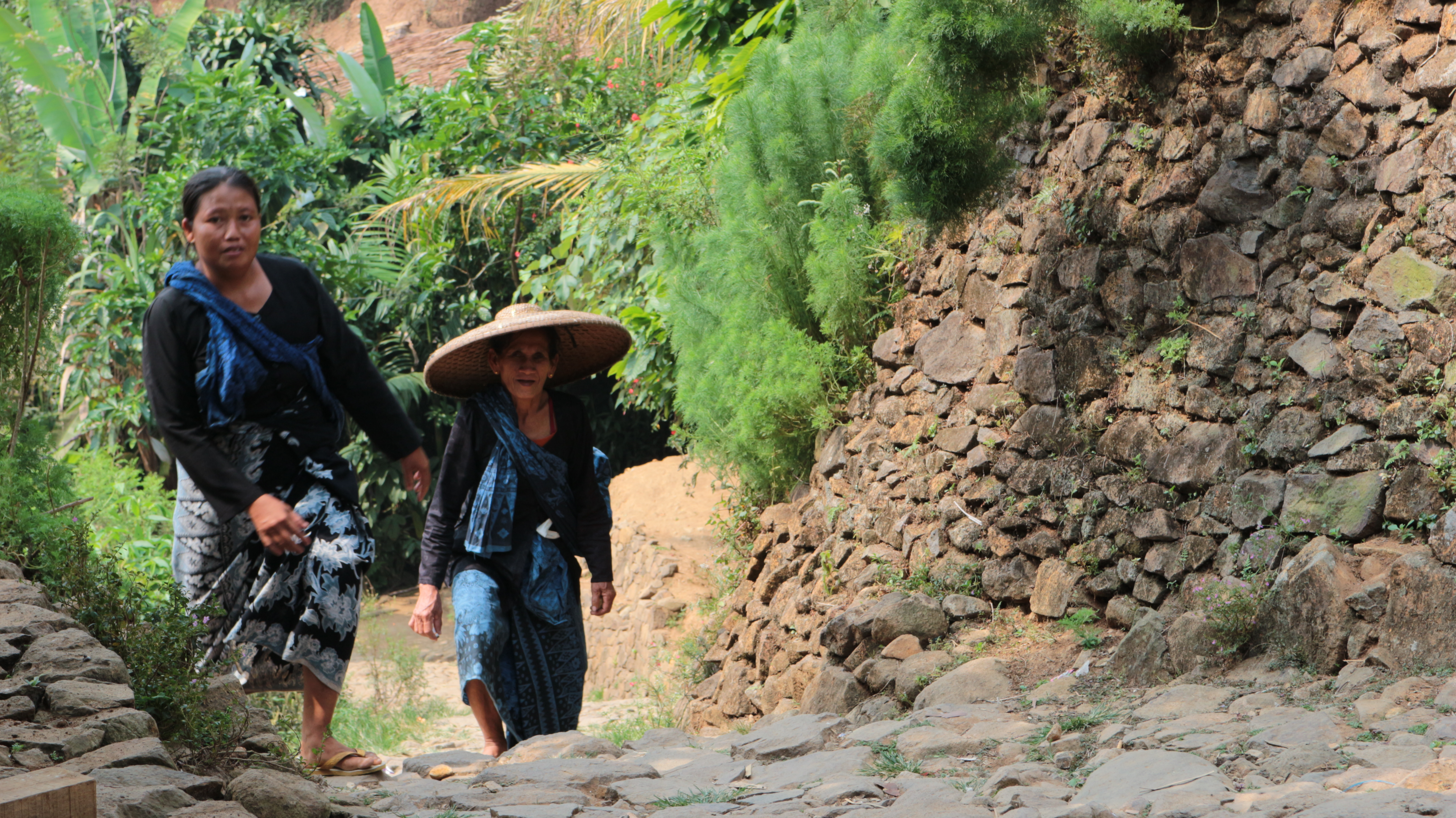
- Panamping (lit. 'Outer Baduy') women in Banten

Total population
- 11,620 (2015 census)

Regions with significant populations
- Indonesia (Lebak Regency, Banten)

Languages
- Baduy, Bantenese, Indonesian

Religion
- Inner: Sunda Wiwitan; Outer and Dangka: Islam, Christianity, others

Related ethnic groups
- Bantenese • Sundanese

The Baduy (Badui: Urang Baduy/Urang Kanékés; Indonesian: Orang Baduy/Orang Sunda Baduy), also known as Badui or Kanékés, are an indigenous Sundanese ethnic group native to the southeastern part of Banten, specifically Lebak Regency, Banten, Indonesia. Many of the Baduy people reject modern technology and live in voluntary isolation from the outside world.

== Etymology ==
The term baduy is a short form derived from baduyut in the Baduy language. It is a native Sundanese term that refers to an endemic vine plant of western Java (Trichosanthes villosa), used as a herbal medicine since ancient times. As part of the Sundanese family, baduyut also bears the same meaning in Old and Modern Sundanese. It is likely that in ancient times, there was a river called Baduyut, as the term Cibaduyut (ᮎᮤᮘᮓᮥᮚᮥᮒ᮪) itself literally means "Baduyut River" in the Sundanese language, thus it is possible that this tribe was named after the river. The Baduy people sometimes prefer to be called Urang Kanekes (lit. "Kanekes people") or Urang Cibeo (lit. "Cibeo people") instead, as these are the names of their cultural regions or villages.

There is also a theory suggesting that the word baduy was initially an exonym used by outsiders to refer to these tribal groups, stemming from the idea that the Dutch equated them with Bedouin Arabs.

== Subgroups ==
The Baduy are divided into three subgroups, characterized by where they live and how much contact they have with the outside world:

- Tangtu, Jero, or Kejeroan (lit. "inner Baduy"; Baduy Dalam in Indonesian). This subgroup prefers to be called by their place of origin, such as Urang Kanekes (lit. "Kanekes people"; Orang Kanekes in Indonesian), after their village; Urang Girang (lit. "Girang people"; Orang Hulu in Indonesian), according to their settlement location, near the upper part of the river; and Urang Rawayan, after the Ci Rawayan river. Additionally, they are called Urang Tangtu Tilu (lit. "three inner village people"; Orang Tiga Tangtu in Indonesian), which identifies their three main villages.
- Panamping (lit. "outer Baduy"; Baduy Luar in Indonesian)
- Dangka (lit. "Dangka Baduy"; Baduy Dangka in Indonesian)

No foreigners are allowed to meet the Inner Baduy, though the Outer Baduy do foster some limited contacts with the outside world. Dangka Baduy have sustained contact with the outside world and no longer live in the Kanekes area.

== Settlement area ==
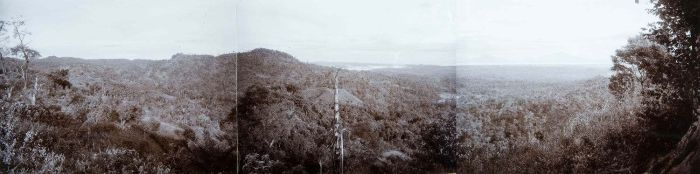
View over the hills near the Badui village of Kaduketug, circa 1915–1926

The Baduy region is geographically located at 6°27'27" – 6°30'0" south and 108°3'9" – 106°4'55" east, with an area of 5,101.85 hectares. It is subdivided into two sectors: the Baduy Dalam area is 2,749 hectares, while Baduy Luar is slightly smaller, at 2,387 hectares. Based on 2017 data from Statistics Indonesia, the Baduy population consisted of 11,699 individuals, or 3,413 families. However, by 2023, that number had declined to only 9,558 individuals. They are centred at the drainage basin of the Ci Ujung and Cikanekes rivers, around the foothills of Kendeng volcano, within the settlement of Kanekes, in Leuwidamar district, Lebak Regency, Banten, a distance of 65 km (40 mi) from Serang and 172 km (107 mi) from Jakarta, the nation's capital. The region, situated at an elevation of 300–500 meters (980–1,640 ft) above sea level, consists of hilly topography, with surfaces that reach up to an average of 45% slope, with volcanic (north), precipitate (centre), and mixed soil (south). The average temperature is 20 °C (68 °F). The Baduy homeland is contained within 50 km^{2} (19 sq mi) of hilly forest area.

=== Inner Baduy ===
The three main settlements of Inner Baduy are Cikeusik, Cikertawana, and Cibeo. They fall within a protected area, as designated by Lebak Regional Regulation No. 2 of 2014. The region features a hilly topography, with elevations ranging from 325 meters above sea level (a.s.l.) in the north to 900 meters a.s.l. in the south, where its highest point is found. Geologically, the area is primarily formed by quaternary volcanic deposits, specifically the Baduy and Cimapag formation, along with volcanic rock from Endut mountain, claystone, and Citorek tuff. These formations constitute the Bayah Mountains zone, which is commonly composed of sand, silt, mud, and crop residue. The predominant soil type is latosol.

The region's average annual temperature is 26.5 °C, with minimal seasonal fluctuation; temperatures typically range from a minimum of 26.1 °C in February to a maximum of 26.8 °C in May, September, and October. The average monthly rainfall is 171.1 mm, categorizing it as medium. This rainfall contributes to an average relative humidity of 81%, with the lowest levels (76%) occurring in August and September and the highest (85%) in February. The area is located within the Ciujung watershed, with the Ciujung River traversing the region from its forested southern upstream to the northern downstream. The area encompasses eleven sub-watersheds. Land use within Baduy Dalam is diverse, comprising seven distinct categories: kampung (settlements), leuit (rice storage areas), huma (dry agricultural land), jami (mixed gardens), reuma (old secondary forests), leuweung lembur (homestead gardens), and leuweng kolot (protected forests).

=== Outer Baduy ===
In 2023, the Outer Baduy region comprised a total of 63 villages, including Cigoel (Kaduketug 3), Cipondok (Kaduketug 2), Kaduketug 1, Kadukaso, Cihulu, Balingbing, Marengo, Gajeboh, Kadujangkung, Babakan Karakal (Kadugede), Karakal, Kaduketer 1, Kaduketer 2, Cikopeng, Cibongkok, Ciwaringin, Binglugemok (Cibitung), Batara, Sorokokod, Panyerangan, Cigula, Cicatang, Cicatang 2, Kadukohak, Cisaban, Babakan Cisaban, Cijanar, Leuwihandam, Cicangkudu, Cisagu Landeuh, Cijengkol, Cikadu 1, Cikadu 2, Cipiit 1, Cilingsuh, Cisagu Pasir, Cipiit 2, Ciranji, Babakan Eurih, Cisadane (Leuwigede), Cibagelut, Batubeulah, Cibogo, Pamoean, Cipaler, Cicakal Muara, Cicakal Tarikolot, Cicakal Girang, Cicakal Girang 2, Cicakal Girang 3 (Leuwibuleud), Cijangkar, Ciranca Kondang, Kanengai, and Cikulingseng.

== Language ==
The native language of the Baduy people, Baduy, is most closely related and sometimes considered to be a dialect of Sundanese. Native speakers are dispersed in regions around the Mount Kendeng, Rangkasbitung district of Lebak Regency, Pandeglang Regency, and Sukabumi, West Java. It is estimated that there are 11,620 speakers as of 2010. In order to communicate with outsiders, the Baduy people tend to speak Sundanese and sometimes Indonesian to some degree of fluency. The Inner Baduy in Kanekes village are mostly illiterate, hence, their customary religious belief system and ancestral folk tales are preserved in the form of oral tradition.

=== Education ===
Formal education for Baduy children is seen by Baduy people as a violation of their traditional customs, and they have so far refused the Indonesian government's proposals to build educational facilities in their villages. As a result, few Baduy people are educated or able to read or write.

== Origins ==
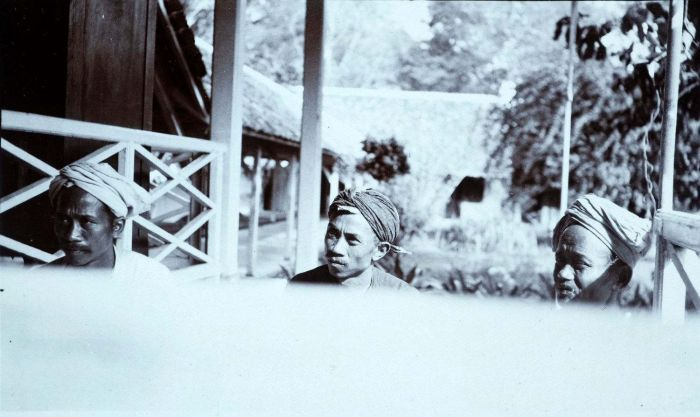
Delegates of the Baduy people, circa 1915–1926

=== Mythology and beliefs ===
The Baduy people's creation story describes the Earth's genesis as a viscous, transparent substance they call ngenclong, which was initially the size of a single rice grain. This gradually hardened and expanded, eventually forming the Sasaka Domas, a megalithic structure they consider to be the core and center of the Earth and the starting point for all life. They also believe this to be the place where the first human was sent to Earth, becoming the ancestor of all peoples. The Baduy also believe that the ngenclong separated into different parts. The part that went up to form the sky is called Buana Nyungcung, and the part that went down is known as Buana Larang, which serves as a hell. Between these two realms lies Buana Tengah, the home of humans, trees, and animals, as well as Buana Suci Alam Padang, where the rice goddesses reside. Buana Suci Alam Padang consists of 18 layers. The highest layer is called Bumi Suci Alam Kahiyangan or Mandala Hiyang, and it is where Nyi Pohaci Sanghiyang Asri and Sunan Ambu live. According to their belief system, the Baduy people regard themselves as descendants of Batara Cikal, one of seven deities, or gods, who was sent to Earth.

=== History ===
The Baduy origin story, which holds that they have lived in the region since the creation of humanity, differs from the opinions of some historians, including Carl Ludwig Blume and Cornelis Marinus Pleyte, who believe that the Baduy are descendants of the aristocracy of the Sunda Kingdom of Pajajaran, who fled the 1579 attack by the Banten Sultanate because their ruler, Prabu Siliwangi, refused to convert to Islam. One hypothesis suggests the Baduy community originated from people in Banten who fled the spread of Islam after the fall of the Sunda Kingdom. These refugees are thought to have initially settled along the Cibaduy River, which is believed to be the source of their name. While C.A. Kruseman has proposed that the Baduy are an indigenous group of the Banten region, he has also speculated that they moved deeper into the forest after 1579 CE. The Baduy themselves have rejected the claim that they are descended from Pajajaran, as in their culture, the name is used to refer to malevolent spirits, which they ward off using specific chants.

Another theory suggests that, before the establishment of the sultanate, the western tip of Java island played an important role for the Sunda Kingdom, with Banten serving as a large trading port. Various types of vessels entered the Ciujung River, most of which were used to transport crops harvested from the interior regions. Therefore, the ruler of the region, Prince Pucuk Umun, believed that the river's sustainability needed to be maintained. An army of highly trained royal troops was commanded to guard and manage the dense and hilly jungle areas in the Mount Kendeng region, which may have been the origin of the Baduy. The theory was strengthened by a long-held tradition called seba puun, where the village leader (puun), would go to the capital to report his village's condition to the king. This practice has continued to the present day, with reports being made to the regent of Lebak.

The discrepancy between the two theories has led to the notion that in the past, the identity and historicity of the Baduy had been intentionally concealed in order to protect the community from attacks by the Sunda Kingdom's enemies. Van Tricht, a doctor who had done medical research in the area in 1928, denied this theory, however. According to him, the Baduy are natives of the region and have strongly resisted external influences. The Baduy themselves also refuse to acknowledge that they originate from the fugitives of Pajajaran. According to Danasasmita and Djatisunda, the Baduy people are local to the settlements that are officially mandated by the king, because the people are obliged to preserve the kabuyutan (ancestral or ancestral worship).

== Religion and beliefs ==
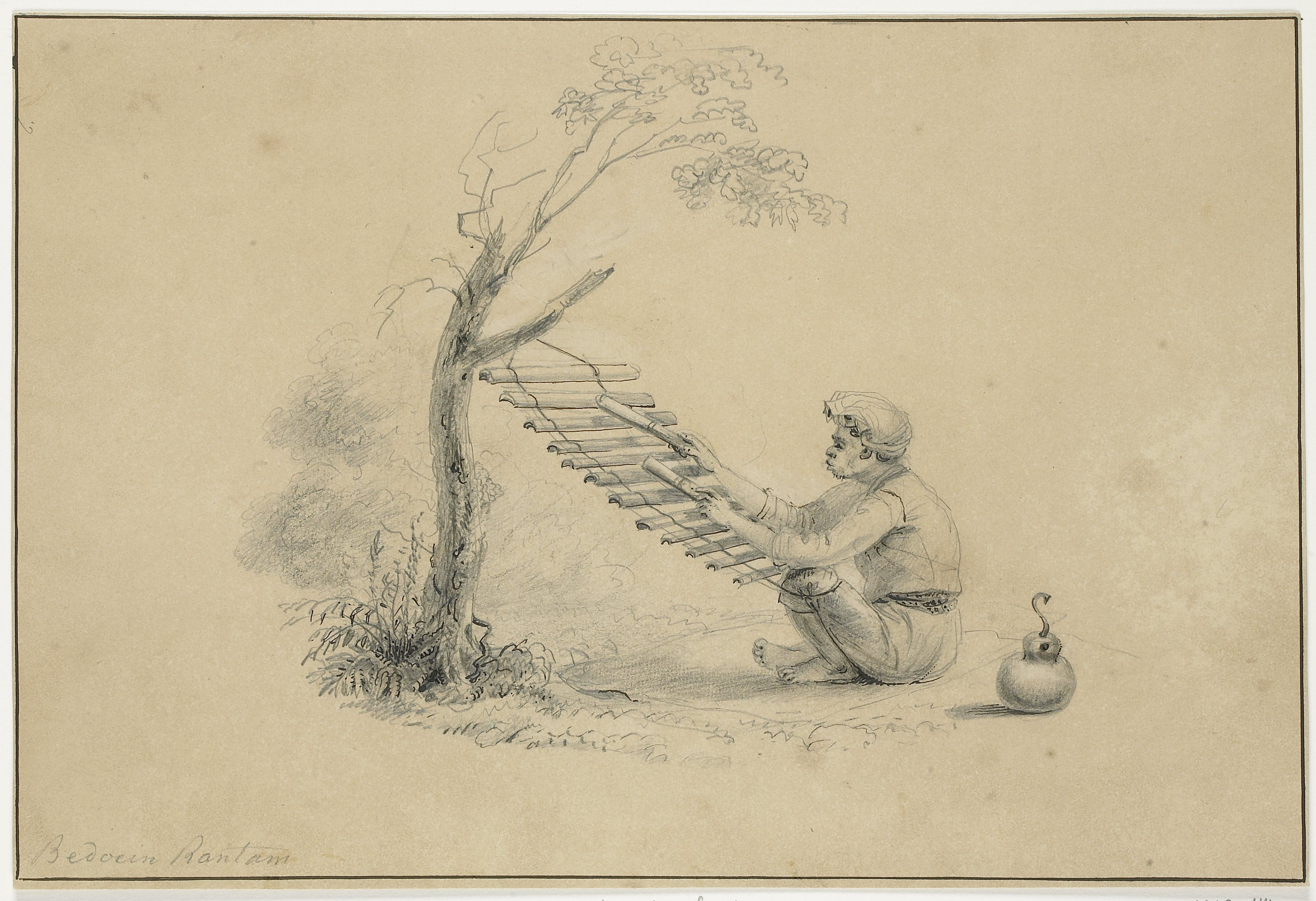
An illustration of a Baduy man playing a calung musical instrument by Jannes Theodorus Bik, circa 1816–1846.

The religion of the Baduy is known as Agama Sunda Wiwitan and is rooted in ancestral worship and honoring or worshiping spirits of natural forces. According to the kokolot (elders) of Cikeusik village, Kanekes people are not adherents of Hinduism or Buddhism. However, in its development, this faith is influenced by and has incorporated elements of Hinduism, and to some extent, Islam.

The form of respect for the spirits of natural forces is carried out by guarding and preserving the natural environment, such as the mountains, hills, valleys, forests, gardens, springs, rivers, and all the ecosystems within them, as well as giving their highest gratitude to nature by treating and protecting the jungle as part of an effort to maintain the balance of the universe. The core of this belief is shown by the existence of pikukuh, or the absolute customary provisions practiced in the daily lives of the Kanekes people. The most important principle of the Kanekes people's pukukuh (adherence) is the concept of "no changes of whatsoever", or the slightest change possible: Lojor heunteu beunang dipotong, pèndèk heunteu beunang disambung (meaning "What's long cannot be cut [to shorten], and what's short cannot be attached [to lengthen]").

The Baduy also observe many mystical taboos. They are forbidden to kill, steal, lie, commit adultery, get drunk, eat food at night, take any form of conveyance, wear flowers or perfumes, accept gold or silver, touch money, or cut their hair. In agriculture, they practice pukukuh by not changing the contour of the land for their fields, so much so that the way of farming is very simple; not cultivating the land using plows or forming terraces, but only using hoe-farming methods, that is, with sharpened bamboo. In the construction of houses, the contouring of the soil surface is also left as is, therefore, the poles of the Kanekes houses are often not of the same length. The words and actions of the Baduy people are expected to be honest, innocent, without beating around the bush, and devoid of bargaining in trade. Other taboos relate to defending Baduy lands against invasion: they may not grow sawah (wet rice), use fertilizers, raise cash crops, use modern tools for working ladang soil, or keep large domestic animals.

The most important religious object for the Kanekes people is the Arca Domas, whose location is kept secret and is considered sacred. The Kanekes people visit the site to worship once a year in the month of Kalima, which, in 2003, coincided with the month of July. Only Pu'un, or the highest customary chairman and several elected members of the community, will follow the entourage to worship. Rainwater is stored in a mortar container in the Arca Domas complex. If it is found to be clear at the time of worship, then it is a sign for the Kanekes people that there will be plenty of rain that year, and the harvest will be bountiful. Conversely, if the mortar container is dry or the water is turbid, then it is a sign of crop failure.

Islamic influence has also penetrated the religion of the Baduy Luar, especially in the Cicakal Girang villages, which are inhabited primarily by Muslims.

== Social classes ==
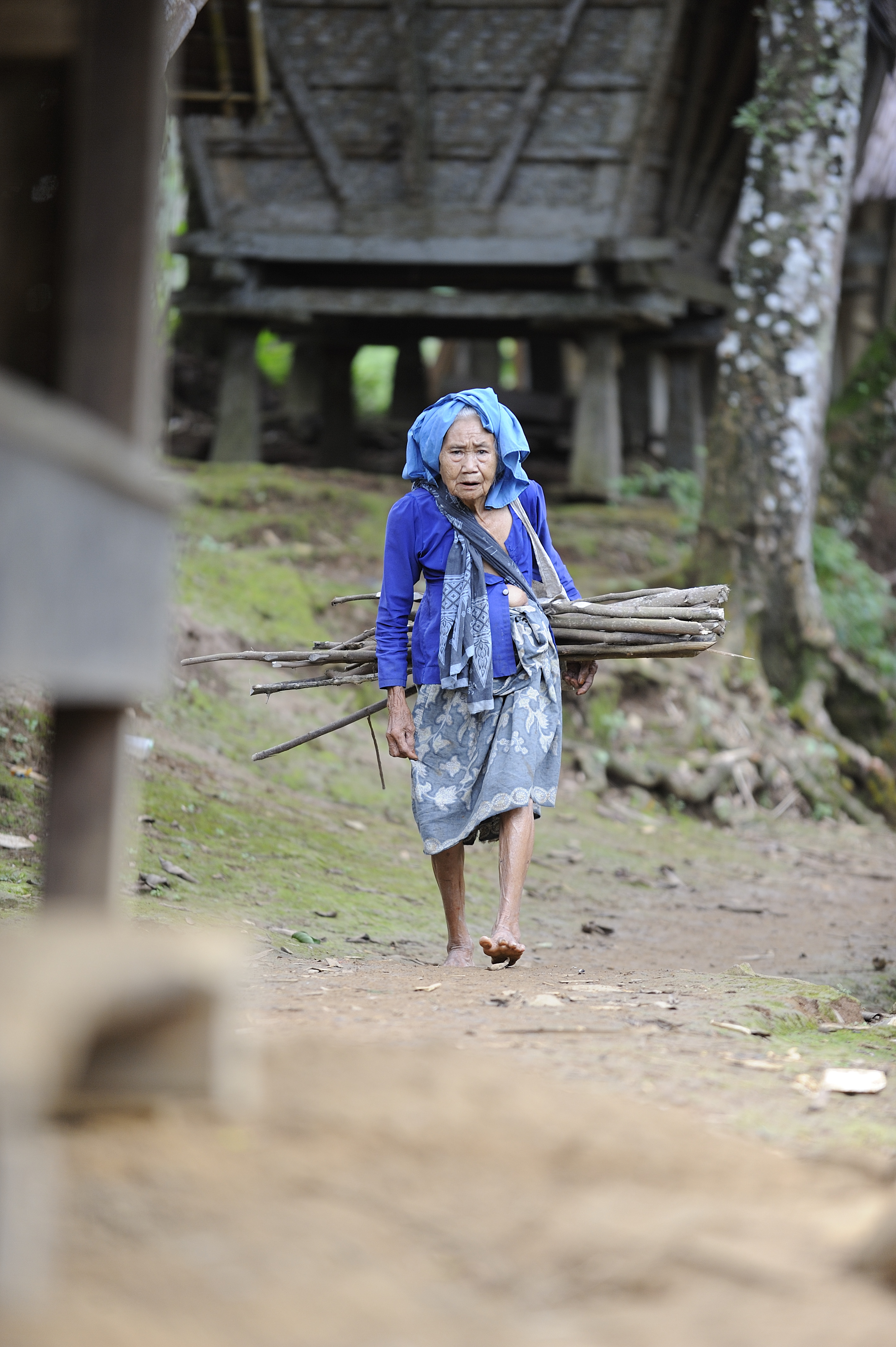
An old Kanekes woman carrying firewood

The Baduy people are closely related to the Sundanese people, although they embrace Sunda Wiwitan as their belief system and isolate themselves to preserve their traditional lifestyle. The Sundanese themselves mostly embrace Islam as their religion. The regions where the Baduy live are called mandalas, from a Sanskrit word meaning "center".

The first group is Tangtu, or Kajeroan, also known as Baduy Dalam or Kanekes Dalam (meaning "Inner Kanekes"), with a population of about 400 consisting of forty families (Kajeroan) who live in the three villages of Cibeo, Cikertawana, and Cikeusik in Tanah Larangan (forbidden territory), where no stranger is permitted to spend the night. A characteristic of the Kanekes Dalam people is the color of their clothing—white and dark blue, as well as the wearing of a white headband. They follow the rigid buyut taboo system very strictly, (see § Religion and beliefs) and thus have made very little contact with the outside world. The priests of this community, known as pu'un, are the only ones allowed to visit the most sacred ground of the Baduy, which lies on Gunung Kendeng, in a place called Arca Domas.

Some of the rules observed by the community include:

- No vehicles are allowed.
- No footwear is allowed.
- The door of the house should face north or south (except the house of the pu'un, or the customary chairman).
- The usage of electronic devices is prohibited.
- No modern clothing is allowed. Only hand-woven black or white fabrics are allowed.

The Panamping, also known as Baduy Luar or Kanekes Luar (meaning "Outer Kanekes"), make up the remainder of the Baduy population, living in 22 villages and acting as a barrier to stop visitors from contacting the more reclusive community. They also follow the rigid taboo system but not as strictly as the Kanekes Dalam, and they are more willing to accept modern influences into their daily lives.

The Baduy Luar have traded their traditional blue-black homespun clothes for conventional clothing. The use of money, batteries, and toys are increasingly common, particularly in northern villages, and a few people from these communities work as seasonal farmhands or find jobs in major cities like Jakarta, Bogor, and Bandung. Additionally, while raising livestock remains banned, some outer villages eat meat caught with the help of trained hunting dogs.

Some Kanekes Dalam have become Kanekes Luar, either through intermarriage or as a result of breaking Kanekes Dalam customary laws. Characteristics of the Kanekes Luar include:

- They are familiar with technology such as electronic devices.
- Construction of houses in the Kanekes Luar permits the use of modern tools, such as saws, hammers, nails, etc.
- Wearing modern clothing like T-shirts and jeans is permitted.
- The use of modern home appliances, such as mattresses, pillows, plastic or glass plates and cups, etc., is allowed.
- A significant number have converted to Islam and been influenced by the outside world.

There are two Kanekes Luar settlements, namely Padawaras (Cibengkung) and Sirahdayeuh (Cihadam), which function as a buffer between the Kanekes Dalam and the outside world.

== Governance ==
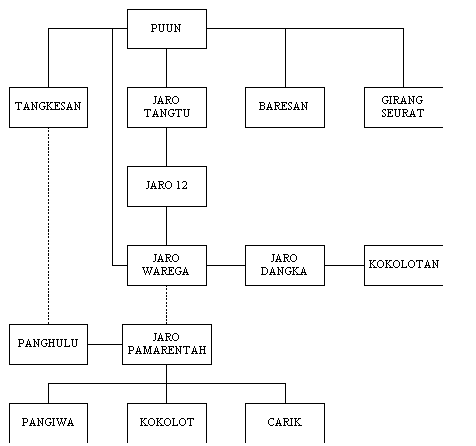
Governing structure of the Baduy people

The Kanekes community recognizes two governing systems: the national system, which is in accordance with the laws of Indonesia, and the customary system, which abides by the customs of the community. Both are combined or acculturated in such a way that there is no conflict. Conventionally, the Kanekes people are led by a head of settlement, who is referred to as jaro pamarentah. Customarily, the Kanekes people fall under the leadership of the pu'un, who can be found in three settlements, or tangtu. The position is passed down through generations, but not necessarily from a father to his children; it can also be handed down to other relatives. The governing term of a pu'un is not specified; instead, it depends on a person's ability to hold on to the position.

== Livelihood ==
The main livelihood of the Baduy people is rice farming. This is divided into four phases over the course of a year: harvesting, post-harvest rituals, land clearing, and planting and field maintenance. During harvesting, no outsiders are allowed in the villages for around three months. The Baduy do not fertilize or irrigate their crops, relying solely on rain.

The Baduy also earn extra income from selling the fruits they gather in the jungle, such as durian and tamarind-plum, as well as wild honey.

== External interactions ==
The Kanekes community, who until the present have adhered strictly to their customs, has not been entirely isolated from the developments of the outside world. They became aware of the establishment of the Sultanate of Banten, which automatically annexed the Kanekes people into the kingdom's territory of power. As a sign of obedience to and recognition of these authorities, the Kanekes community routinely perform the seba ceremony each year, which involves delivering crops such as rice and fruit to the Governor of Banten (and formerly to the Governor of West Java) through the regent of Lebak. In agriculture, the Kanekes Luar people interact closely with outsiders in affairs such as leasing of land and laborers.

In the past, trading was done by barter, but nowadays, the community uses the national currency, the rupiah. The Kanekes people sell fruits, honey, and sugar palm through middlemen. They also purchase necessities that they do not produce themselves from markets.

Today, visitors to the Kanekes customary region are increasing, with a large number consisting of high school or college students. These are welcomed into the community and can even spend the night there, provided that they abide by local rules. These include a ban on taking pictures within the Kanekes Dalam areas as well as a prohibition on the use of soap or toothpaste in the rivers. The customary region of the Kanekes people remains forbidden to non-Indonesians, however, including journalists.

== See also ==
- Agama Hindu Dharma
- Baduy Indigenous Ban
- Hyang
- Sunda Wiwitan
