= Marco Alonso Vela =

Mexican politician

- Born: 10 October 1961 (age 64); Yucatán, Mexico
- Occupation: Deputy
- Political party: PRI

Marco Alonso Vela Reyes (born 10 October 1961) is a Mexican politician affiliated with the Institutional Revolutionary Party (PRI). In the 2012 general election he was elected to the Chamber of Deputies to represent the fifth district of Yucatán during the 62nd Congress.
