= Ángel Paulino Canul =

Mexican politician

- Born: 18 September 1962 (age 62); Opichén, Yucatán, Mexico
- Occupation: Politician

Ángel Paulino Canul Pacab (born 18 September 1962) is a Mexican independent politician who previously belonged to the Institutional Revolutionary Party (PRI).

In 1988–1990 he served as municipal president of Opichén, Yucatán. In the 2003 mid-terms he was elected to the Chamber of Deputies to represent the fifth district of Yucatán during the 59th Congress. Elected on the PRI ticket, he broke with the party and declared himself an independent on 22 March 2006.
