= Gunung Kencana =

District in Banten, Indonesia

- District
- Interactive map of Gunung Kencana
- Coordinates: 6°34′42.9496″S 106°4′43.4086″E
- Country: Indonesia
- Province: Banten
- Regency: Lebak Regency

Area
  - Total: 159.34 km^{2} (61.52 sq mi)

Population (2023)
  - Total: 41,248
  - Density: 258.87/km^{2} (670.46/sq mi)
- Time zone: UTC+7 (WIB)
- Postal code: 42354

Gunung Kencana is an administrative district (kecamatan) in Lebak Regency, Banten, Indonesia.
