= 5th federal electoral district of Yucatán =

Federal electoral district of Mexico

Yucatán's 5th
- Electoral district of the Chamber of Deputies of Mexico

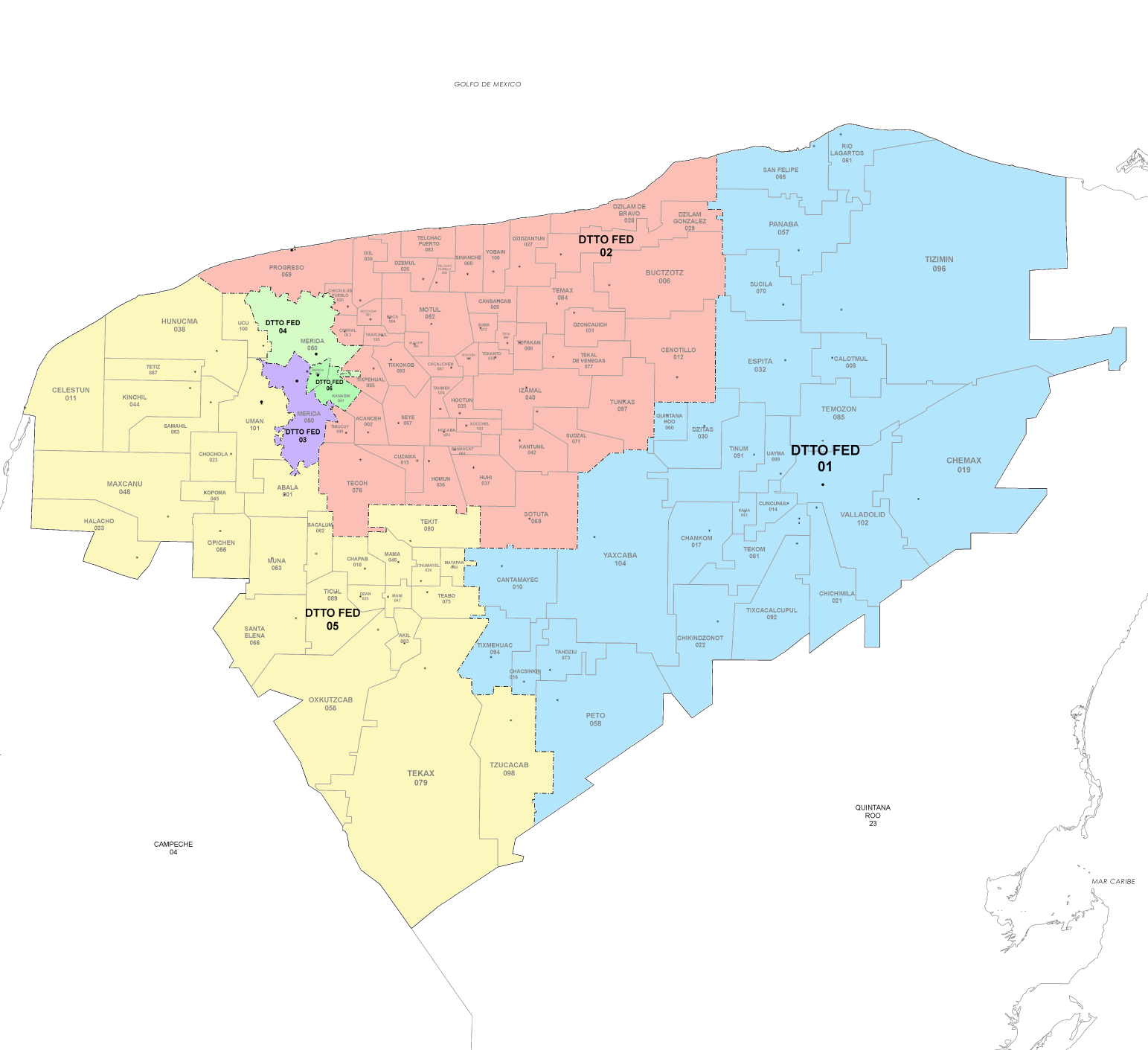
- 5th district since 2023

Incumbent
- Member: Jazmín Yaneli Villanueva Moo
- Party: ▌Morena
- Congress: 66th (2024–2027)

District
- State: Yucatán
- Head town: Umán
- Coordinates: 20°53′N 89°45′W
- Covers: 29 municipalities: Abalá, Akil, Celestún, Chapab, Chocholá, Chumayel, Dzan, Halachó, Hunucmá, Kinchil, Kopomá, Mama, Maní, Maxcanú, Mayapán, Muna, Opichén, Oxkutzcab, Sacalum, Samahil, Santa Elena, Teabo, Tekax, Tekit, Tetiz, Ticul, Tzucacab, Ucú, Umán
- PR region: Third
- Precincts: 186
- Population: 415,271 (2020 census)
- Indigenous: Yes (81%)

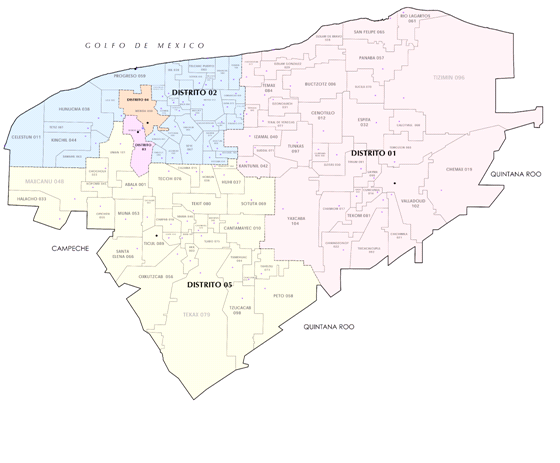
Yucatán under the 2017–2022 districting plan

5th district in 2005–2017

The 5th federal electoral district of Yucatán (Spanish: Distrito electoral federal 05 de Yucatán) is one of the 300 electoral districts into which Mexico is divided for elections to the federal Chamber of Deputies and one of six such districts in the state of Yucatán.

It elects one deputy to the lower house of Congress for each three-year legislative period by means of the first-past-the-post system. Votes cast in the district also count towards the calculation of proportional representation ("plurinominal") deputies elected from the third region.

Created as part of the 1996 redistricting process, it was first contested in the 1997 mid-term election.

The current member for the district, elected in the 2024 general election, is Jazmín Yaneli Villanueva Moo of the National Regeneration Movement (Morena).

== District territory ==
Yucatán gained a congressional seat in the 2023 redistricting process carried out by the National Electoral Institute (INE). Under the new districting plan, which is to be used for the 2024, 2027 and 2030 federal elections, the reconfigured 5th district is located in the south and west of the state. It comprises 186 electoral precincts (secciones electorales) across 29 municipalities:

- Abalá, Akil, Celestún, Chapab, Chocholá, Chumayel, Dzan, Halachó, Hunucmá, Kinchil, Kopomá, Mama, Maní, Maxcanú, Mayapán, Muna, Opichén, Oxkutzcab, Sacalum, Samahil, Santa Elena, Teabo, Tekax, Tekit, Tetiz, Ticul, Tzucacab, Ucú and Umán.

The head town (cabecera distrital), where results from individual polling stations are gathered together and tallied, is the city of Umán. The district had a population of 415,271 in the 2020 census and, with Indigenous and Afrodescendent inhabitants accounting for over 81% of that number, Yucatán's 5th – like all the state's electoral districts, both local and federal – is classified by the INE as an indigenous district. (Note: Population figure indicates total inhabitants, not voters. The INE deems any local or federal electoral district where Indigenous or Afrodescendent inhabitants number 40% or more of the population to be an indigenous district.)

== Previous districting schemes ==
Evolution of electoral district numbers
	1974	1978	1996	2005	2017	2023
Yucatán	3	4	5	5	5	6
Chamber of Deputies	196	300				

2017–2022

Between 1996 and 2022, Yucatán had five federal electoral districts. Under the 2017 scheme, the 5th district's head town was at Ticul and it covered 34 municipalities in the south and west of the state but, unlike the 2022 plan, excluding the coastal municipalities:
- Abalá, Akil, Cantamayec, Chacsinkín, Chapab, Chochola, Chumayel, Cuzamá, Dzán, Halachó, Homún, Huhí, Kopomá, Mama, Maní, Maxcanú, Mayapán, Muna, Opichén, Oxkutzcab, Peto, Sacalum, Sanahcat, Santa Elena, Sotuta, Tahdziú, Teabo, Tecoh, Tekax, Tekit, Ticul, Tixmehuac, Tzucacab and Umán.

2005–2017

Under the 2005 districting scheme, the district covered 33 municipalities in the west and south of the state, including the coastal municipalities to the west of Progreso. The district's head town was the city of Ticul.

1996–2005

Between 1996 and 2005, Yucatán's new 5th district covered a similar territory as under the 2017 scheme: without the coastal municipalities of the north-west and with a larger slice of the south of the state. The head town was Ticul and the district covered 37 municipalities.

== Deputies returned to Congress ==
(Mexico) National parties
- Current
- PAN
- PRI
- PT
- PVEM
- MC
- Morena
- PAZ
- Somos
- Defunct or local only
- PLM
- PNR
- PRM
- PNM
- PP
- PPS
- PARM
- PFCRN
- CON
- PANAL
- PSD
- PES
- PES
- PRD

Yucatán's 5th district
Election	Deputy	Party	Term	Legislature
1997	Carlos Sobrino Sierra	Institutional Revolutionary Party	1997–2000	57th Congress
2000	Rosa Elena Baduy Isaac	Institutional Revolutionary Party	2000–2003	58th Congress
2003	Ángel Canul Pacab (Note: Canul Pacab was elected for the PRI but declared himself an independent on 22 March 2006.)	Institutional Revolutionary Party	2003–2006	59th Congress
2006	Gerardo Escaroz Soler	National Action Party (Mexico)	2006–2009	60th Congress
2009	Martín Enrique Castillo Ruz	Institutional Revolutionary Party	2009–2012	61st Congress
2012	Marco Alonso Vela Reyes; Alberto Leónides Escamilla Cerón	Institutional Revolutionary Party	2012–2015; 2015	62nd Congress
2015	Felipe Cervera Hernández; Rafael Chan Magaña	Institutional Revolutionary Party	2015–2018; 2018	63rd Congress
2018	Juan José Canul Pérez	Institutional Revolutionary Party	2018–2021	64th Congress
2021	Carmen Navarrete Navarro	Ecologist Green Party of Mexico	2021–2024	65th Congress
2024	Jazmín Yaneli Villanueva Moo	National Regeneration Movement	2024–2027	66th Congress

== Presidential elections ==
Yucatán's 5th district
Election	District won by	Party or coalition	%
2018	Andrés Manuel López Obrador	Juntos Haremos Historia	35.7559
2024	Claudia Sheinbaum Pardo	Sigamos Haciendo Historia	70.0069
