= María del Carmen Ordaz =

Mexican politician

- Born: 6 February 1965 (age 61); Yucatán, Mexico
- Occupation: Deputy
- Political party: PRI

María del Carmen Ordaz Martínez (born 6 February 1965) is a Mexican politician affiliated with the Institutional Revolutionary Party (PRI). In the 2012 general election she was elected to the Chamber of Deputies to represent the second district of Yucatán during the 62nd Congress.
