= Nanggung =

- Town and District
- Location in Bogor Regency, Java and Indonesia Nanggung (Java) Nanggung (Indonesia)
- Coordinates: 6°40′20″S 106°32′45″E
- Country: Indonesia
- Province: West Java
- Regency: Bogor Regency

Area
  - Total: 217.49 km^{2} (83.97 sq mi)
- Elevation: 471 m (1,545 ft)

Population (mid 2024 estimate)
  - Total: 104,927
  - Density: 482.45/km^{2} (1,249.5/sq mi)
- Time zone: UTC+7 (IWST)
- Area code: (+62) 251
- Vehicle registration: F
- Villages: 11
- Website: kecamatannanggung.bogorkab.go.id

Nanggung is a town (kelurahan) and an administrative district (Indonesian: kecamatan) in the Bogor Regency, West Java, Indonesia and thus part of Jakarta's metropolitan area.

Nanggung District covers an area of 217.49 km^{2}, and had a population of 84,015 at the 2010 Census and 98,492 at the 2020 Census; the official estimate as at mid 2024 was 104,927 (comprising 54,699 males and 50,228 females). The administrative centre is at the town of Parakan Muncang, and the district is sub-divided into eleven villages (desa), all sharing the postcode of 16650, as listed below with their areas and populations as at mid 2024.

Kode Wilayah	Name of desa	Area in km^{2}	Population mid 2024 estimate
32.01.21.2001	Malasari	82.62	9,179
32.01.21.2004	Bantar Karet	84.10	13,103
32.01.21.2003	Cisarua	14.11	11,569
32.01.21.2002	Curug Bitung	11.56	11,710
32.01.21.2007	Nanggung (town)	6.97	8,958
32.01.21.2009	Pangkal Jaya	3.70	8,811
32.01.21.2010	Sukaluyu	2.07	7,062
32.01.21.2005	Hambaro	3.12	8,246
32.01.21.2006	Kalong Liud	3.29	10,156
32.01.21.2008	Parakan Muncang	3.45	7,965
32.01.21.2011	Batu Tulis	2.50	8,168
32.01.21	Totals	217.49	104,927
