= Cinangka =

Town in Depok, West Java, Indonesia

Coordinates: 6°22′00″S 106°43′59″E

Cinangka is a small town in Depok, West Java, Indonesia, founded in the 1980s.

Cinangka District has administrators called Camat.

The neighborhood became extremely polluted from 1983 to 2006, due to illegal lead smelting, causing widespread damage to crops and many birth defects amongst the residents' babies.

== Facilities ==
Cinangka has the following facilities:

- Public Market
- Masjids
- Schools
- Administrators Office

== Education ==
- Nurul Fikri Boarding School is located in Cinangka.
