= Sukajaya =

- Town and District
- Location in Bogor Regency, Java and Indonesia Sukajaya (Java) Sukajaya (Indonesia)
- Coordinates: 6°35′34″S 106°30′41″E
- Country: Indonesia
- Province: West Java
- Regency: Bogor Regency

Area
  - Total: 156.12 km^{2} (60.28 sq mi)

Population (mid 2024 estimate)
  - Total: 75,129
  - Density: 481.23/km^{2} (1,246.4/sq mi)
- Time zone: UTC+7 (IWST)
- Area code: (+62) 251
- Vehicle registration: F
- Villages: 11
- Website: kecamatansukajaya.bogorkab.go.id

Sukajaya is a town and an administrative district (Indonesian: kecamatan) in the Bogor Regency of West Java Province, Indonesia (not to be confused with the district of the same name in Sabang city) and thus part of Jakarta's metropolitan area.

Sukajaya District covers an area of 156.12 km^{2}, and had a population of 55,671 at the 2010 Census and 66,922 at the 2020 Census; the official estimate as at mid 2024 was 75,129 (comprising 39,356 males and 35,773 females). The administrative centre is at the town of Sukajaya, and the district is sub-divided into eleven villages (desa), all sharing the postcode of 16661, as listed below with their areas and populations as at mid 2024.

Kode Wilayah	Name of desa	Area in km^{2}	Population mid 2024 estimate
32.01.35.2001	Cisarua	45.68	3,212
32.01.35.2002	Kiarasari	17.99	10,329
32.01.35.2006	Kiarapandak	13.62	7,704
32.01.35.2007	Harkatjaya	5.50	7,370
32.01.35.2003	Sukajaya (town)	4.04	6,127
32.01.35.2004	Sipayung	8.17	8,849
32.01.35.2008	Sukamulih	14.70	7,121
32.01.35.2009	Pasir Madang	15.01	5,820
32.01.35.2005	Cileuksa	24.76	9,109
32.01.35.2010	Urug	4.00	5,366
32.01.35.2011	Jayaraharja	2.65	4,122
32.01.35	Totals	156.12	75,129
