= Nurul Fikri Boarding School =

Coordinates: 6.1989°S 105.8967°E

Nurul Fikri Boarding School Serang (Pesantren Ibnu Salam, also known by the abbreviation NFBS) is a secondary and high school located on a campus off Jalan Palka in the village of Bantarwaru, Cinangka district, Serang Regency, Banten province in the west of Java, Indonesia.

== History ==
The late Malik Abdus Salam gave his land to Nurul Fikri Foundation to build a school. It started operation in 1999 with 48 students and 10 teachers with some employees. And then, Nurul Fikri Boarding School was given facilities by some muhsinin or helpers from the World Assembly of Muslim Youth (WAMY).

== Development ==
Since its inception, Nurul Fikri was developed as an Integrated Islamic School that combines Islamic teaching and general sciences. The school is under the governance of the Ibnu Salam Nurul Fikri Islamic Boarding Schools Foundation. In 2005, NFBS was recognised by the Indonesian Ministry of Education as a National Standard School. Nurul Fikri has overseas students from Malaysia, Pakistan, Brunei and Saudi Arabia.

== Boarding ==
The school has dormitory leaders responsible for keeping discipline and maintaining separation between male and female students. The boarding programme instills Islamic faith, morals and helps build character.

== List of principals ==
- Drs. Idris Azhar
- Mr.Muhammad Damiri, M.Pd
- Drs. Syaurium Sy Khatib

== Current administrators ==
- Principal: KH. Achmad Munaji Istamar, Lc
- Junior High School/Secondary Headmaster: Mrs. Irmawati, S.Pd
- Senior High School Headmaster: Mr. Hari Untung Maulana, M.Pd
