= Baduy language =

Sundanesic language spoken by Baduy people

Baduy
- Basa Baduy; Basa Sunda Kanékés
- Pronunciation: [ba.dʊj], [ka.nɛ.kɛs]
- Native to: Indonesia
- Region: Banten Province
- Ethnicity: Baduy
- Native speakers: 11,620 (2015 census)
- Language family: Austronesian: Malayo-Polynesian; Malayo-Sumbawan (?); Baduy
- Early form: Old Sundanese
- Writing system: Initially it was spoken language. There is no official writing system used for Baduy, but for the purposes of linguistic analysis, the Latin (especially Sundanese alphabet) is used to write Baduy.

Language codes
- ISO 639-3: bac
- Glottolog: badu1237
- Linguasphere: 31-MFN-b
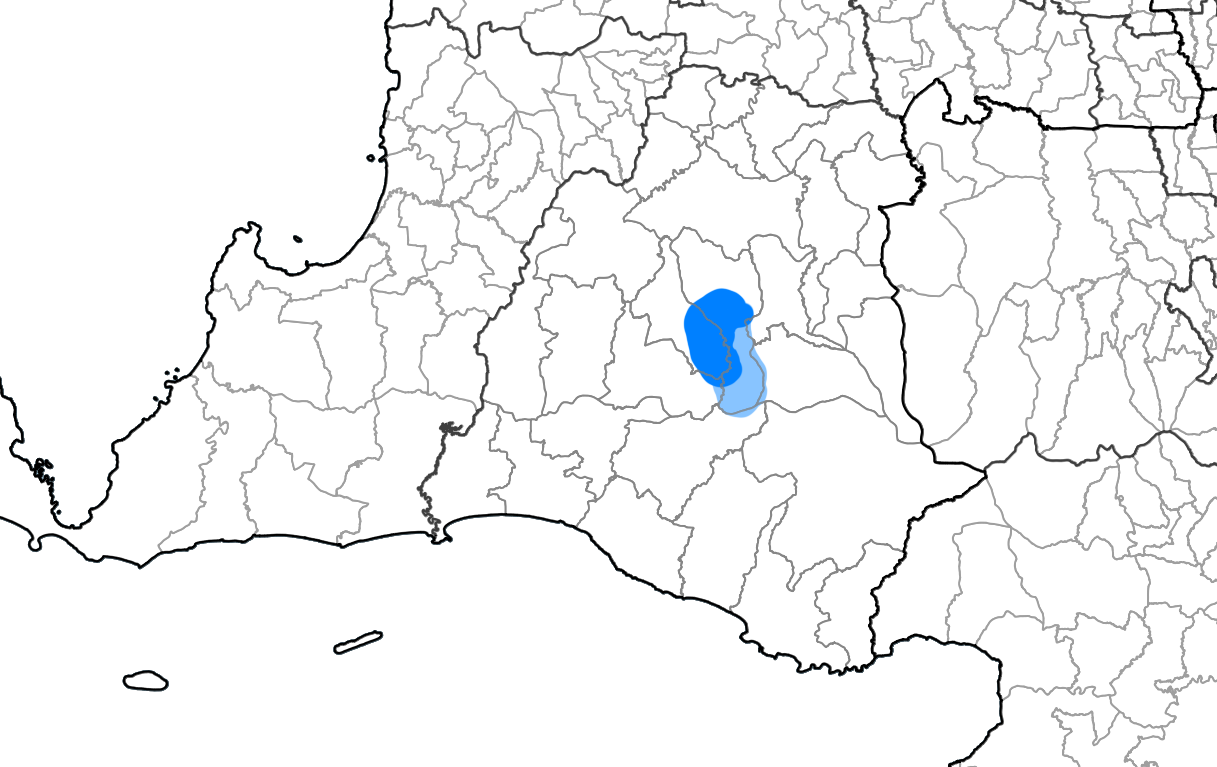
- Areas where the Baduy language is spoken predominately areas where the Baduy language is spoken in a minority

- Baduy is not endangered according to the classification system of the UNESCO Atlas of the World's Languages in Danger

Baduy (or sometimes referred to as Kanekes) is one of the Sundanese-Baduy languages spoken predominantly by the Baduy people. It is conventionally considered a dialect of Sundanese, but it is often considered a separate language due to its diverging vocabulary and cultural reasons that differ from the rest of the Sundanese people. Native speakers of the Baduy language are spread in regions around the Mount Kendeng, Rangkasbitung district of Lebak Regency and Pandeglang Regency, Banten Province, Indonesia. It is estimated that there are 11,620 speakers as of 2015.

Just like Sundanese, Baduy based on linguistic typology is a language that sequences sentence structure elements of type subject–verb–object word order. As an agglutinative language, Baduy has various affixes which are still productive. Verbs can be distinguished into transitive and intransitive forms, as well as active and passive.

== Classification ==
Position of Baduy in Malayo-Sumbawan

The position of Sundanese-Baduy languages is still being debated between the Malayo-Sumbawan and Greater North Borneo which are both in the branch Malayo-Polynesian in Austronesian languages. (Note: Glottolog version 4.1 notes Baduy along with Sundanese form a Sundanese-Baduy language family.)

Some reference sources classify Baduy as part of Banten Sundanese dialect. However, unlike some other Sundanese dialects in the Banten which has been mixed with elements of non-Sundanese languages, Baduy only gets a little influence from other languages and still retains some language elements of Old Sundanese as its predecessor, this contrasts when compared to several other Sundanese dialects which are considered more modern.

== Current status ==
Baduy is one of the regional languages in Indonesia and its existence is sufficiently preserved by the local government, although research on this language is still relatively small. The use of the Baduy language is considered as the most important marker of ethnic identity for the Baduy people. Even though the Baduy themselves are an isolated society, in fact some of them have bilingual ability, which means they can also communicate using Indonesian in their daily lives, especially when speaking with others from outside the Baduy who come to their area.

Ethnologue classifies Baduy as a language with level 6a which is categorized as vigorous (strong) on the EGIDS scale, (Note: EGIDS stands for Expanded Graded Intergenerational Disruption Scale, a scale that assesses how severe the interruption of the intergenerational chain of transmission is for a language. Level 1 indicates that the language is commonly used in international communication, while level 10 indicates that the language is extinct.) and its development shows a positive attitude.

== Phonology ==
There is no difference between Baduy and Sundanese and several other dialects in phonology. Phonemes Both languages these show the same number of phonemes, as many as 25 phonemes with 7 vowel phonemes and 18 consonant phonemes. However, for the phonemes /ə/, /o/, /ɨ/, and /i/ in Baduy there are variations in usage, such as in the words tolu, teulu and tilu 'three', euweuh and oweuh 'none', and enya and onya 'yes'.

=== Vowels ===
Vowel phonemes in Baduy are /ɛ/ ⟨é⟩, /a/, /ɨ/ ⟨eu⟩, /ə/ ⟨e⟩, /i/, /ɔ / ⟨o⟩ and /u/.

Vowel phonemes
| | Front | Central | Back |
|---|---|---|---|
| Close | i | ɨ | u |
| Mid | ɛ | ə | ɔ |
| Open | | a | |

=== Consonants ===
The 18 Baduy consonant phonemes can be described in the following table.

Consonant phonemes
| | Bilabial | Alveolar | Palatal | Velar | Glottal |
|---|---|---|---|---|---|
| Nasal | m | n | ɲ | ŋ | |
| Plosive/Affricate | p b | t d | tʃ dʒ | k ɡ | ʔ |
| Fricative | | s | | | h |
| Lateral | | l | | | |
| Trill | | r | | | |
| Approximant | w | | j | | |

=== Intonation ===
In terms of accent or word pressure and intonation, the Baduy show a very prominent characteristic. Words with two syllables generally get the stress increasing on the first syllable, then decreasing on the second, such as héjo becomes héj'jo (green), dukun becomes duk'kun (shaman), iheung becomes ih'heung (I don't know) and others.

Intonation in sentences is indeed a distinct characteristic found in Baduy. Sometimes in a sentence it ends with tone down sound, or with a flat tone. Likewise, the interrogative sentence does not always end with a rising voice, but sometimes it ends with a lowering voice.

== Characteristics ==
The Baduy community (especially the Inner Baduy) are generally a society that is isolated from the outside world so that the language they use is not much influenced by languages that exist outside their territory such as Indonesian or other Sundanese dialects. In general, the influence of language from outside like this is only found in the Panamping Baduy or Outer Baduy.

=== Lexicon ===
==== Features ====
At the lexicon level, for example vocabulary, there are several typical Baduy vocabularies that are not found or are not commonly used in several other Sundanese dialects, especially Priangan Sundanese. A comparison of several differences between the Baduy lexicon and standard Sundanese can be seen in the table below. Other typical lexicons can be seen in here.

| Baduy | Pronunciation (in IPA) | Sundanese | pronunciation (in IPA) | Glos | Ref. |
|---|---|---|---|---|---|
| ambu kolot | [ambu kolot] | nini | [nini] | grandmother | |
| acéng | [acɛŋ] | ujang | [ud͡ʒaŋ] | Greetings to the boys | |
| babarahmu | [babarahmu] | susuguh | [susugʊh] | dishes, banquets | |
| bangu | [baŋu] | awi | [awi] | bamboo | |
| conggah | [cɔŋgah] | sanggup | [saŋgʊp] | able | |
| gungguman | [gʊŋguman] | lingkungan | [liŋkuŋan] | environment, area | |
| hawon, dihawon | [hawon], [dihawon] | lawan, dilawan | [lawan], [dilawan] | to fight, to be fought | |
| heulan | [hɤlan] | heula | [hɤla] | first, ahead | |
| iget, kaiget | [igət], [kaigət] | teureuy, kateureuy | [tɤrɤj], [katɤrɤj] | swallow, to be swallowed | |
| ja | [d͡ʒa] | da | [da] | phatic to state the cause | |
| kolényér | [kolɛɲɛr] | konéng | [konɛŋ] | yellow color | |
| lojor | [lod͡ʒɔr] | panjang | [pand͡ʒaŋ] | long | |
| megat elos | [məgat əlɔs] | ngahalangan jalan | [ŋahalaŋan d͡ʒalan] | blocking the way | |
| ngawadang | [ŋawadaŋ] | dahar beurang | [dahar bɤraŋ] | lunch | |
| oweuh | [owɤh] | euweuh | [ɤwɤh] | nothing | |
| paul | [pawʊl] | biru | [biruʔ] | blue | |
| rayoh | [rayɔh] | kawali | [kawali] | cauldron | |
| ucut | [ucʊt] | ragrag | [ragrag] | fall | |

==== Lexical changes ====
Changes lexical found between Baduy and Sundanese can be analyzed and grouped into several types of processes, some of which are in the form of vocabulary that can be found between the two languages such as for example beurat [bɤrat] 'heavy' with different variations such as abot [abot] in standard Sundanese and badot [badot] 'heavy' in Baduy language. The second type of lexical change is in the form of vocabulary that can be found between the two languages but the variations are only found in Baduy language, for example beulah [bɤlah] 'split' and bareuh [barɤh] 'swelling' with typical Baduy variations bencar [bəncar] 'split' and kembung [kəmbʊŋ] 'swelling' which is not found in standard Sundanese. The next type of lexical change can be in the form of vocabulary that is not related to each other between Baduy and standard Sundanese, for example nyaring [ɲarɪŋ] 'lying' in Baduy with ngagolér [ŋagolεr] 'lay' in standard Sundanese. The type of lexical change that others are in the form of vocabulary whose pronunciation differs between Baduy and standard Sundanese with variations found only in Baduy, for example enteu [əntɤ] 'no' in Baduy with henteu [həntɤ] 'no' in standard Sundanese with typical Baduy variations moan [mowan] 'no'.

== Reading list ==
- Al-Rawafi, A.; Kurniawan, E.; Isnendes, R. (2017). The Semantics of Kinship Terminologies of Baduy, Indonesia. Proceedings of the 2nd International Conference on Sociology Education (ICSE 2017) (Paper). Vol. 1. Bandung: SciTePress–Science and Technology Publications. pp. 5–11. doi:10.5220/0007091800050011. ISBN 978-989-758-316-2.
- Berthe, L. (1965). "Aînés et cadets l'alliance et la hiérarchie chez les Baduj". L'Homme. 5 (3–4): 189–223. doi:10.3406/HOM.1965.366748. JSTOR 25131197.
- Iskandar, J. (1998). Swidden cultivation as a form of cultural identity : the Baduy case (PhD thesis). University of Kent. doi:10.22024/UniKent/01.02.94437.
