= Felipe Cervera =

Mexican politician

- Born: 1 December 1975 (age 50); Mérida, Yucatán, Mexico
- Occupation: Politician
- Political party: PRI

Felipe Cervera Hernández (born 1 December 1975) is a Mexican politician from the Institutional Revolutionary Party (PRI). In the 2009 mid-terms he was elected to the Chamber of Deputies to represent the second district of Yucatán during the 61st Congress. He was re-elected to Congress for Yucatán's fifth district in the 2015 mid-terms.
