= Sunan Ambu =

Deity in Sundanese mythology

Sunan Ambu or Batari Sunan Ambu (Sundanese: ᮘᮒᮛᮤ ᮞᮥᮔᮔ᮪ ᮃᮙ᮪ᮘᮥ) is a goddess according to Sundanese beliefs, the mother goddess of the Sundanese, and resides in the Kahyangan. She is often portrayed as a mother who, in Sundanese mythology, takes care of the homeland and all honored mortals. In the pre-Islamic belief system of West Java, Sunan Ambu was the most important female goddess of the celestial world called kahyangan, possibly a sign of the respected place that women occupy in Sundanese society.

== Etymology ==
Her name is derived from the Sundanese Susuhunan Ambu which can be translated as "The Noble Mother", "Mother Queen" or "Mother Goddess".

== In folktales ==
She is often featured in many folk tales of Sundanese origin, notably Lutung Kasarung, Sangkuriang and Mundinglaya Dikusumah.
