= Lebak Regency =

Regency in Banten, Indonesia

Lebak Regency Kabupaten Lebak
- Regency

Other transcription(s)
  - Sundanese: ᮊᮘᮥᮕᮒᮦᮔ᮪ ᮜᮨᮘᮊ᮪
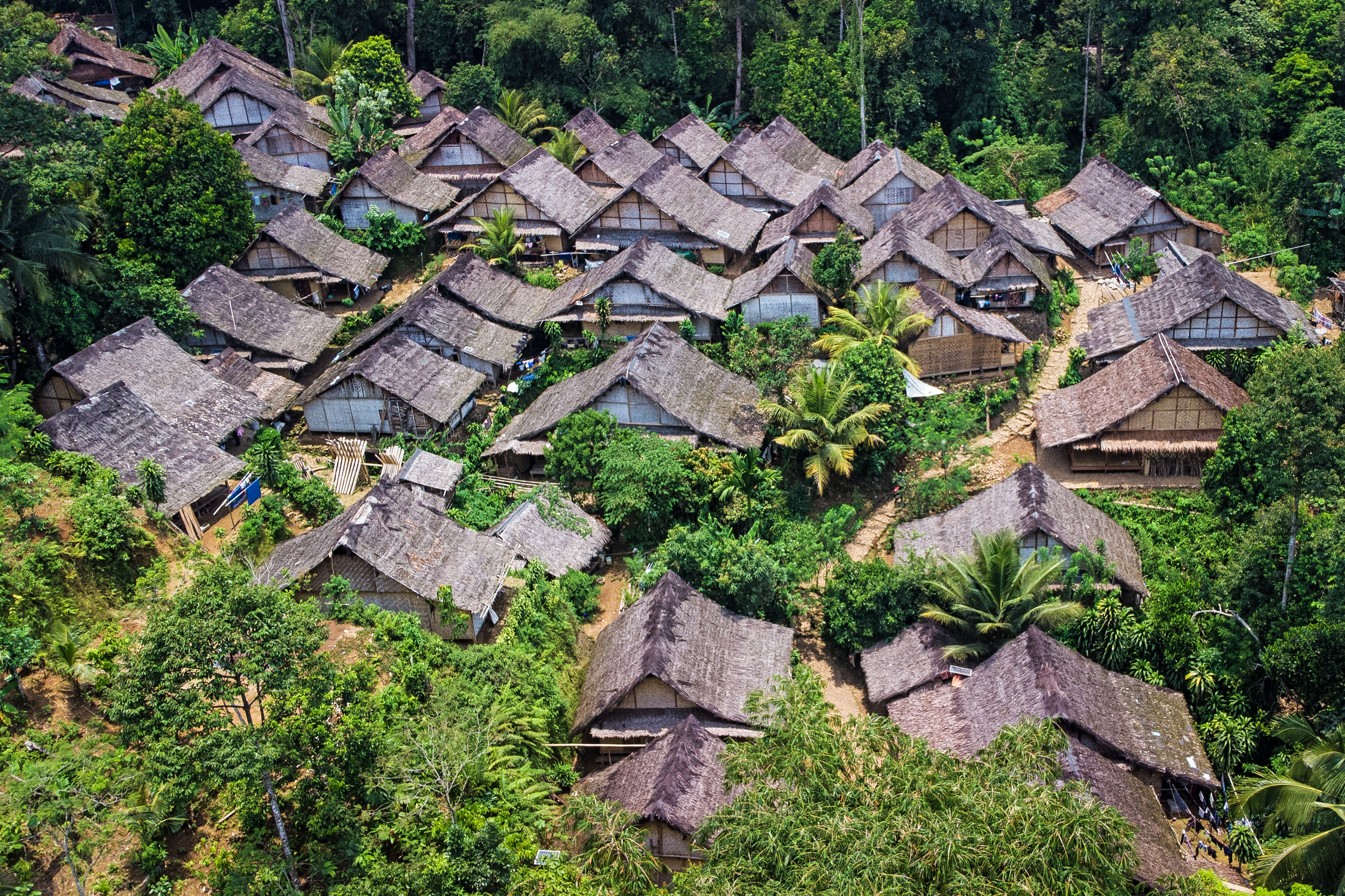
- Baduy village

- Coat of arms
- Nickname: Lebak
- Motto(s): ᮄᮙᮔ᮪ ᮃᮙᮔ᮪ ᮅᮙᮔ᮪ ᮃᮙᮤᮔ᮪ Iman Aman Uman Amin (Faithful, Safe, All-given by God)
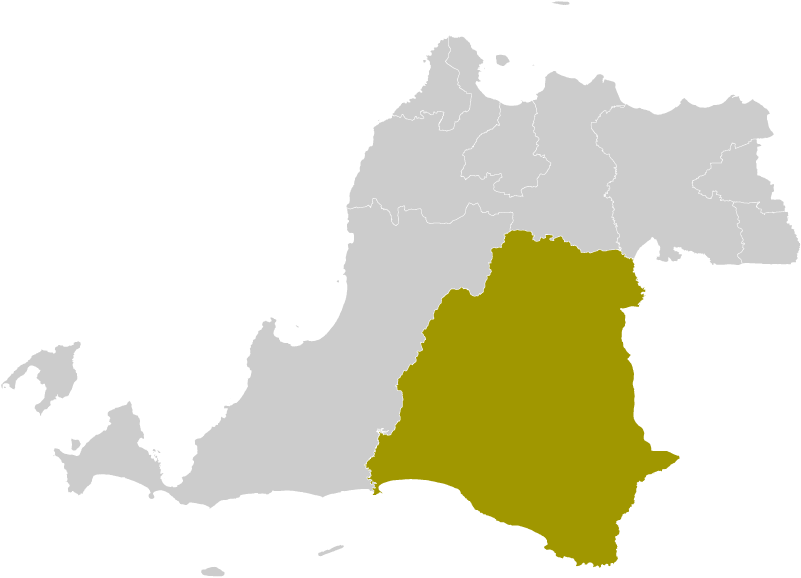
- Location within Banten

- Location in Java and Indonesia Lebak Regency (Indonesia)
- Coordinates: 6.65°S 106.21667°E
- Country: Indonesia
- Province: Banten
- Regency seat: Rangkasbitung

Government
  - Regent: Mochamad Hasbi Asyidiki Jayabaya
  - Vice Regent: Amir Hamzah

Area
  - Total: 3,481.35 km^{2} (1,344.16 sq mi)

Population (mid 2023 estimate)
  - Total: 1,480,593
  - Density: 425.293/km^{2} (1,101.50/sq mi)

Demographics
  - Ethnic groups: Bantenese, Sundanese, Baduy
- Time zone: UTC+7 (IWST)
- Area code: (+62) 252
- Website: lebakkab.go.id

Lebak Regency (Indonesian: Kabupaten Lebak; pronounced [kabuˌpat̪ɛn ləˈbak̚]) is a regency of Banten province, Indonesia. It is located on the island of Java. The regency has an area of 3,481.35 km^{2} and had a population of 1,204,095 at the 2010 census and 1,386,793 at the 2020 census; the official estimate as of mid-2023 was 1,480,593. The town of Rangkasbitung in the north of the regency is the administrative centre. The regency is bordered by the Pandeglang Regency to the west, the Serang Regency to the north, and the Tangerang Regency to the north-east, by the Bogor and Sukabumi regencies (both in West Java Province) to the east, and by the Indian Ocean to the south.

== History ==
The Lebak Regency is the regency to which the Dutchman Eduard Douwes Dekker, better known by his pseudonym Multatuli, was appointed in 1856 as Assistant Resident. Douwes Dekker observed that the local regent exploited the local population and requested his removal. He made a few mistakes in this. He bypassed his direct chief and overlooked the size of abuse by the regent. The regent being of local nobility but paid by the colonial government was regularly in poor circumstances having to keep up with demands of patronage for his large family, according to the adat, the traditional law. Bad practices were known and condoned to a certain extent by the colonial administration. Governmental research that same year showed however more serious abuse by the lesser local officials. The governor-general disapproved of Dekker's tactless conduct and ordered his replacement, which Dekker refused. He resigned after three months of duty in Lebak. Home he published four years later Max Havelaar, or the Coffee Auctions of the Dutch Trading Company, a pamphlet-novel, which had great influence on later administrators, less by force of analysis than by the vigour of its language, setting a new standard for Dutch literature.

== Administrative districts ==
The regency is divided into 28 districts (kecamatan), tabulated below with their areas and populations from the 2010 census and the 2020 census; together with the official estimates as of mid-2023. They are divided for convenience into three geographical sectors, which have no administrative function. The table also includes the locations of the district administrative centres, the number of administrative villages in each district (totaling 340 rural desa and 5 urban kelurahan - the latter all in Rangkasbitung District), and its postal codes.

Kode Wilayah	Name of district (kecamatan)	Area in km^{2}	Pop'n census 2010	Pop'n census 2020	Pop'n estimate mid 2023	Admin centre	No. of villages	Post codes
36.02.01	Malingping	130.34	61,500	71,084	76,905	Malingping Selatan	14	42391
36.02.21	Wanasalam	133.43	51,233	58,130	62,817	Bejod	13	42396
36.02.02	Panggarangan	180.84	35,242	38,538	41,811	Situregen	11	42390
36.02.26	Cihara	144.54	29,530	33,174	35,810	Cihara	9	42392
36.02.03	Bayah^{(a)}	143.29	40,716	45,435	48,346	Bayah Barat	11	42393
36.02.20	Cilograng	100.34	31,689	35,220	37,449	Gunung Batu	10	42398
36.02.19	Cibeber	454.20	54,228	56,722	60,756	Warung Banten	22	42394
36.02.16	Cijaku	134.88	26,876	30,588	32,983	Cijaku	11	42397
36.02.28	Cigemblong	144.83	19,527	21,591	23,277	Cigemblong	8	42395
	Totals of southern sector	1,566.69	360,541	390,482	420,154		109	
36.02.09	Banjarsari	149.73	57,384	65,450	70,364	Cidahu	20	42355
36.02.10	Cileles	173.42	46,684	54,436	59,203	Cikareo	12	42393
36.02.08	Gunung Kencana	159.34	32,661	38,327	41,248	Gunung Kencana	12	42354
36.02.07	Bojongmanik	78.29	21,206	24,565	25,865	Bojongmanik	9	42363
36.02.27	Cirinten	113.59	24,765	29,155	32,162	Ciriten	10	42365
36.02.06	Leuwidamar	151.10	50,430	54,462	60,437	Lebakparahlang	12	42362
36.02.05	Muncang	86.19	31,615	37,279	40,166	Muncang	12	42364
36.02.22	Sobang	105.80	28,361	31,263	33,215	Sinar Jaya	10	42315 -42318
36.02.04	Cipanas	75.36	45,388	52,378	53,813	Sipayung	14	42372
36.02.25	Lebakgedong	90.41	21,537	21,864	22,992	Banjarsari	6	42351
36.02.12	Sajira	112.26	46,366	55,832	57,276	Sajira	15	42371
36.02.11	Cimarga	194.45	60,968	71,507	76,816	Margajaya	17	42361
36.02.17	Cikulur	86.60	46,627	58,281	59,110	Curugpanjang	13	42356
	Totals of central sector	1,576.54	503,991	593,460	632,667		162	
36.02.15	Warunggunung	47.57	52,302	62,000	67,817	Selarraja	12	42352
36.02.18	Cibadak	35.51	58,057	70,839	68,478	Pasar Keong	15	42357
36.02.14	Rangkasbitung	74.22	116,659	134,945	144,733	Muara Ciujung Timur	16 ^{(b)}	42311: 42319
36.02.24	Kalanganyar	28.91	31,982	38,828	41,565	Pasir Kupa	7	42311: 42312
36.02.13	Maja	69.63	50,526	59,705	66,043	Maja	14	42382
36.02.23	Curugbitung	82.28	30,036	36,534	39,136	Curugbitung	10	42381
	Totals of northern sector	338.12	339,563	402,851	427,772		74	
	Totals for Lebak Regency	3,481.35	1,204,095	1,386,793	1,480,593		345	

Notes: (a) including five small offshore islands - Pulau Manuk, Pulau Tanjunglayar, Pulau Karangbokor, Pulau Karangmalang, and Pulau Karangmasigit.
(b) comprising the five kelurahan (with populations in 2023) of Cijoro Lebak (12,808), Cijoro Pasir (11,551), Muara Ciujung Barat (9,569), Muara Ciujung Timur (19,781), and Rangkasbitung Barat (7,825), and eleven desa including Rangkasbitung Timur (14,641).

== Tourism ==
To the southern coast of the regency, there are Sawarna Beach and Ciantir Beach which can be accessed from Jakarta via a six hour drive. The modest Sawarna village has no available 24 hours electricity and no television broadcast can be accessed. In some areas, terraced rice fields are like in Ubud, Bali. Ciantir Beach is suitable for professional surfers with the high tides of the Indian Ocean.

Since 2018, the regency has operated a history museum in Rangkasbitung, the Multatuli Museum, which focuses on the anti-colonial struggle and the Dutch author Multatuli.

== See also ==
- Baduy people
- Cihara River
- Mount Halimun Salak National Park
- Ujung Kulon National Park
