= Mayor of Tangerang =

- Wali Kota Tangerang
- Coat of arms of Tangerang

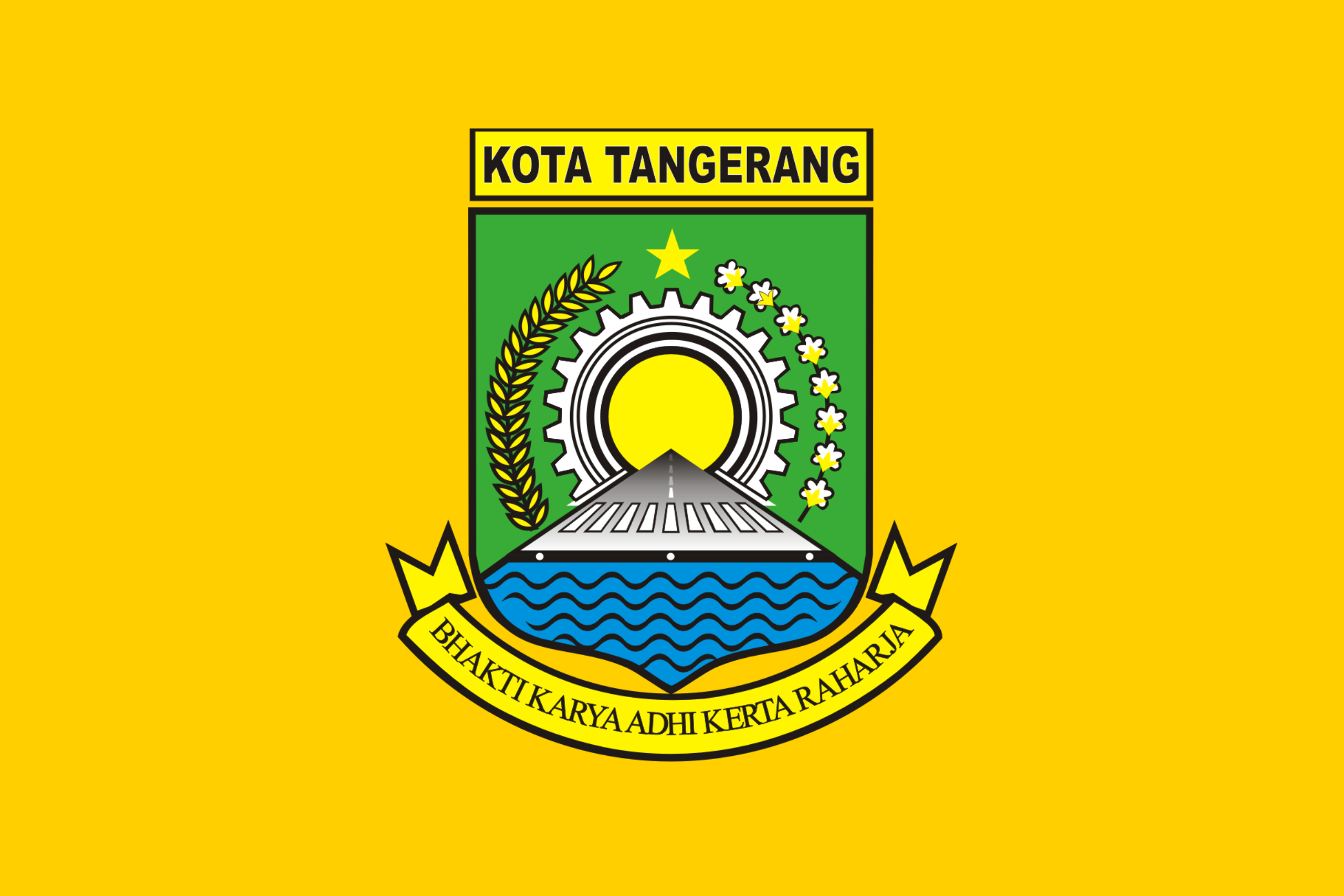
- 120px

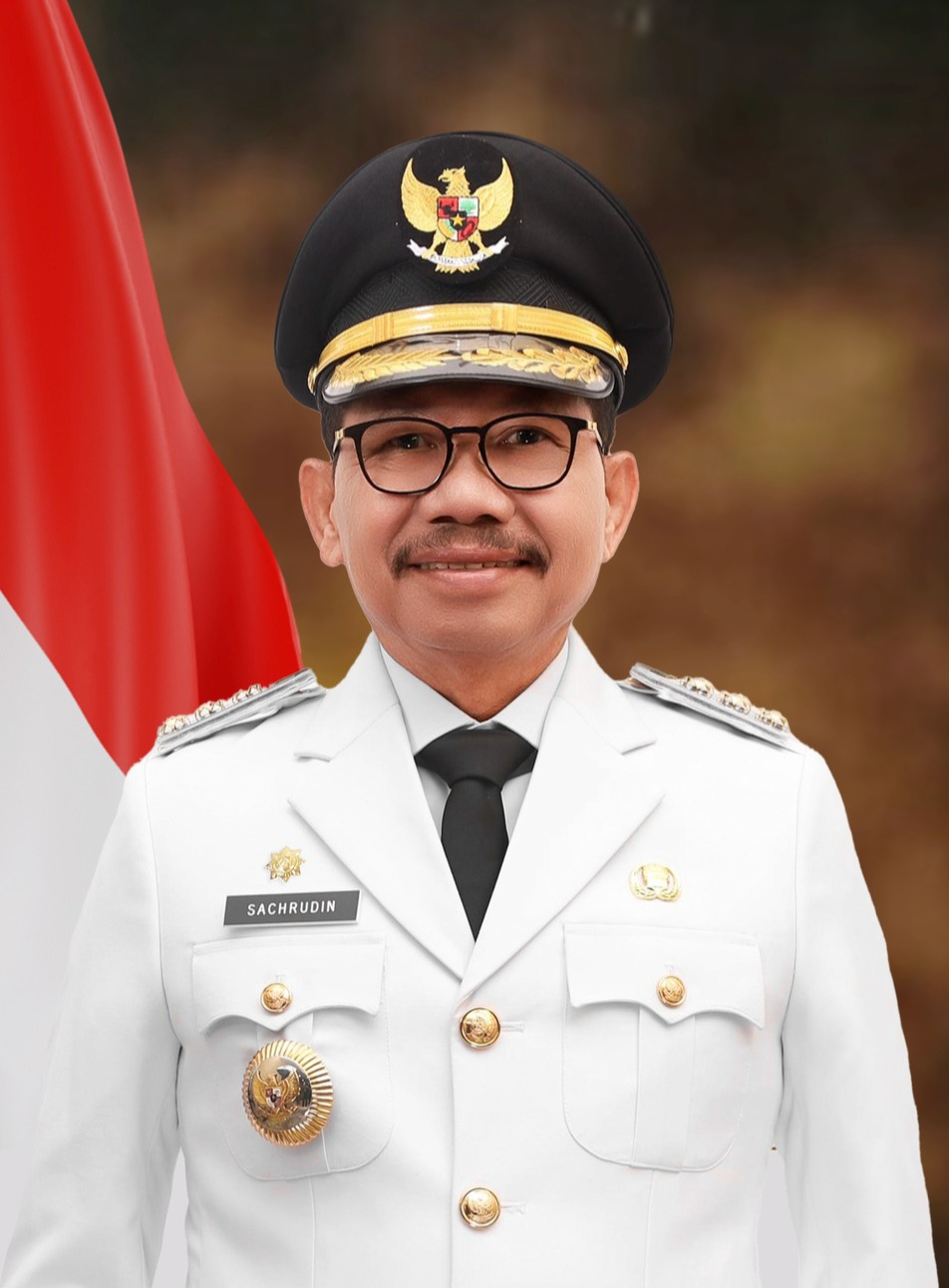
- Incumbent; Sachrudin since 20 February 2025
- Term length: 5 years
- Inaugural holder: Karso Permana
- Formation: December 23, 1981; 44 years ago
- Website: Official website

Mayor of Tangerang is the head of the second-level region who holds the government in Tangerang together with the Vice Mayor and 50 members of the Tangerang City Regional House of Representatives. The mayor and vice mayor of Tangerang are elected through general elections held every 5 years. The first mayor of Tangerang was Karso Permana, who governed the city period from 1981 to 1986.

Before becoming an autonomous city, Tangerang was an administrative city and was part of Tangerang Regency.

== List ==
The following is a list of the names of the Mayors of Tangerang from time to time.

Administrative Mayor of Tangerang
Num.	Portrait	Mayor	Beginning of office	End of Term	Political Party / Faction	Period	Note.	Vice mayor
1		Karso Permana	23 December 1981	1986	Golkar (Note: The Joint Secretariat of Golongan Karya was not a political party during the period 1964 to 1998. Golkar is a group of Golkar groups that oversees several Parent Organization Groups (KINO), including the Republic of Indonesia Civil Servant Corps (KORPRI) which includes civil servants. This official was formerly a bureaucrat in the Ministry of Home Affairs of the Republic of Indonesia who was "employed" as an administrative mayor as well as a member of Golkar.)	1		N/A
2		Yitno (1944–2019)	21 January 1987	1990	Golkar	2		N/A
3		Djakaria Machmud (1944–2017)	1990	28 February 1993	Golkar	3		N/A
Mayor of Tangerang
Num.	Portrait	Mayor	Beginning of office	End of Term	Political Party / Faction	Period	Note.	Vice mayor
–		Djakaria Machmud (Acting) (1944–2017)	28 February 1993	28 August 1993	Golkar	–		N/A
–		Djakaria Machmud (Acting) (1944–2017)	28 August 1993	16 November 1993	Golkar	–		N/A
1		Djakaria Machmud	16 November 1993	16 November 1998	Golkar (1993–1998); Independent (1998)	1		N/A
2		Mochammad Thamrin	16 November 1998	16 November 2003	Independent	2		N/A
3		Wahidin Halim (born 1954)	16 November 2003	16 November 2008	Demokrat	3		Deddy Syafei; 2003–2008
3		Wahidin Halim (born 1954)	16 November 2008	12 September 2013	Demokrat	4 (2008)		Arief Rachadiono; 2008–2013
4		Arief Rachadiono (born 1977)	24 December 2013	24 December 2018	Demokrat	5 (2013)		Sachrudin; 2013–2023
4		Arief Rachadiono (born 1977)	26 December 2018	26 December 2023	Demokrat	6 (2018)		Sachrudin; 2013–2023
5		Sachrudin (born 1961)	20 February 2025	Incumbent	Golkar	7 (2024)		Maryono Hasan

== Temporary replacement ==
In the government stack, a regional head who submits himself to leave or temporarily resigns from his position to the central government, then the Minister of Home Affairs prepares a replacement who is a bureaucrat in the regional government or even a vice mayor, including when the mayor's position is in a transition period.

Portrait	Mayor	Party	Beginning	End	Duration	Period	Definitive	Ref.
	Arief Rachadiono (Daily executive)	Demokrat	5 October 2011	18 October 2011	13 days	4 (2008)	Wahidin Halim	
	Arief Rachadiono (Daily executive)	Demokrat	12 September 2013	16 November 2013	65 days	4 (2008)	Wahidin Halim	
	Rachmansyah (Daily executive)	Independent	16 November 2013	24 December 2013	38 days	—	Transition	
	Muhammad Yusuf (Acting)	Independent	15 February 2018	23 June 2018	128 days	5	Arief Rachadiono	
	Nurdin (Acting)	Independent	26 December 2023	20 February 2025	1 year, 56 days	—	Transition	

== See also ==
- Tangerang
- List of incumbent regional heads and deputy regional heads in Banten
