= 2017 Indonesian local elections =

- 15 February 2017; 19 April 2017 (Jakarta)

7 governors, 8 mayors, and 76 regents
- Registered: ± 41,000,000
Leadership before election
See #Elections
Elected Leadership
See #Elections

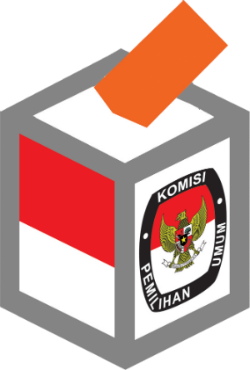
Logo of the elections

Local elections were held in Indonesia on 15 February 2017, with a single run-off for Jakarta on 19 April 2017. The series of elections was the second time local elections were held simultaneously across the country after the 2015 local elections. In total, the election contested 7 gubernatorial, 18 mayoral and 76 regent seats with 41 million eligible voters and 337 candidate pairs.

Like other local elections in Indonesia (except for Jakarta), the elections followed a simple majority, first-past-the-post system where the candidates with the most votes automatically wins the seat even if they have less than 50% of the votes.

== Background ==
Following the fall of Suharto and the Indonesian transition to democracy, local elections began taking place allowing citizens to directly vote for leaders of local subdivisions in June 2005, which had previously been elected through a closed vote by the local legislative councils (Indonesian: Dewan Perwakilan Rakyat Daerah/DPRD). These elections were held separately for both provincial and municipal (cities and regencies) levels, resulting in on average an election every 3 days across the country according to the director-general of regional autonomy Djohermansyah Djohan. Between June 2005 and 2013, around 1,000 such elections were held prompting the discussion of a single simultaneous election to save costs.

Simultaneous local elections (Pilkada Serentak) were first held in Indonesia on 2015. Future plans for the elections included ones in 2017, 2018 and 2020, with appointed central government officials taking office instead for 2022 and 2023. It was planned that by 2024, the local executive elections could be held simultaneously with the presidential and legislative elections.

== Schedule ==
Registration for candidates were separated into tickets supported by political parties and independent candidates who were required to prove popular support by submitting copies of ID cards, the quantity of which ranged from 6.5 to 10 percent of the area's number of eligible voters depending on the local population in accordance to Law No. 8 of 2015. The latter were required to register to the General Elections Commission (Indonesian: Komisi Pemilihan Umum) between 6 and 10 August 2016. Tickets backed by a political party or a coalition of such required the parties to have the cumulative support of either 20 percent of DPRD seats or 25 percent of the popular vote in the 2014 legislative election, and were to register between 19 and 21 September 2016. After a verification process, official candidates were announced on 24 October 2016 and the ballot numbers were given out on the following day. The campaigning period commenced on 28 October and continued until 11 February the following year. A three-day election silence followed, and the votes were cast on 15 February.

After the wave of elections, the votes were recapitulated and counted. Official announcement of the results were done between 8 and 10 March 2017, and the winners given official status by the Constitutional Court subject to disputes. For the case of Jakarta, a majority vote was required to win the election, which was not obtained from the 15 February vote and required a run-off on 19 April. The results of Jakarta's run-off was announced on 30 April.

According to data by the Ministry of Home Affairs, the elections used up Rp 7 trillion (US$520 million). Minister Tjahjo Kumolo stated that the elections were less efficient and required more funding than the previous system of individual elections.

== Elections ==
=== Gubernatorial ===
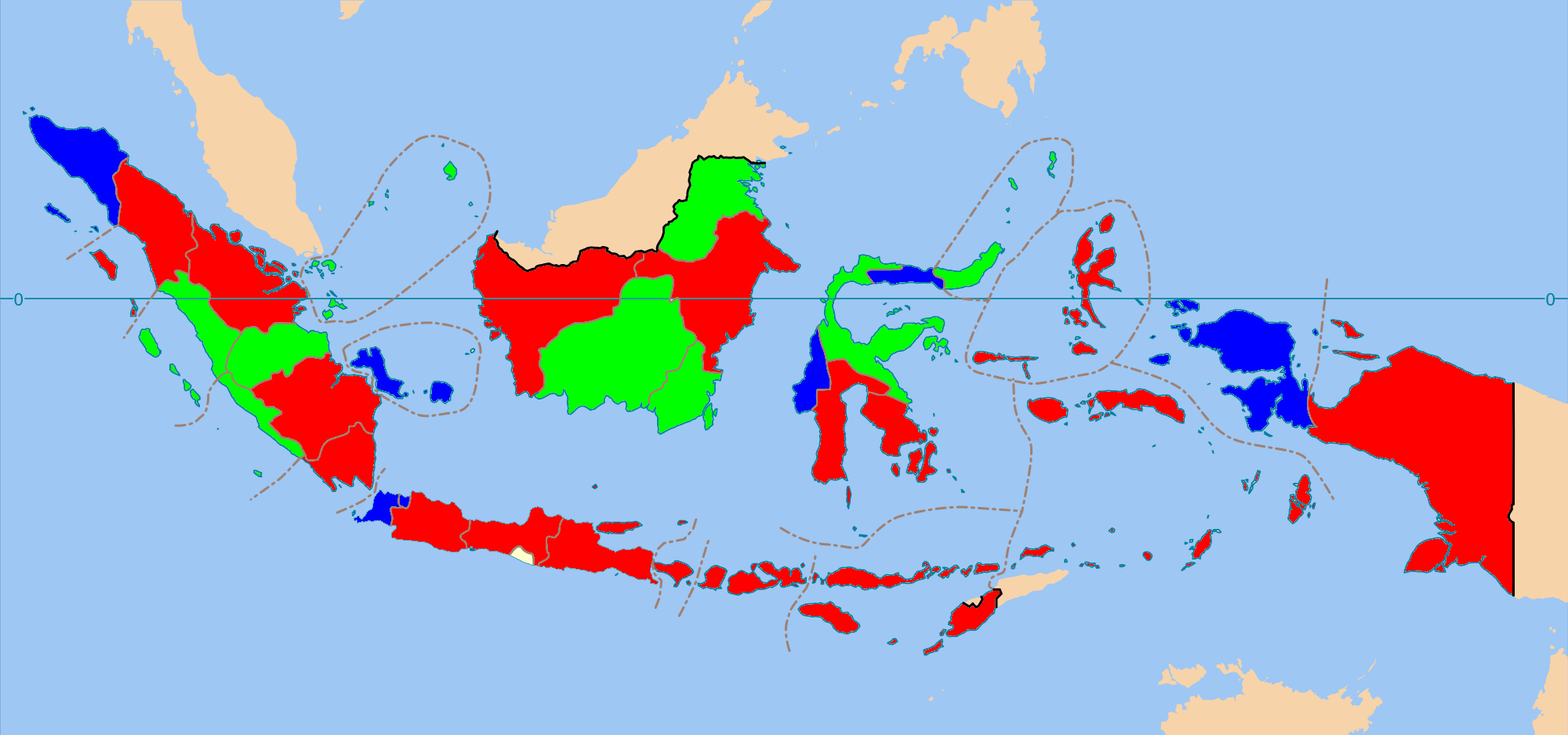
Map of the gubernatorial elections by year. Provinces in blue held gubernatorial elections in 2017.

| Province | Incumbent | Elected | Notes |
|---|---|---|---|
| Aceh | Zaini Abdullah | Irwandi Yusuf | |
| Bangka Belitung | Rustam Effendi | Erzaldi Rosman Djohan | |
| Jakarta | Basuki Tjahaja Purnama | Anies Baswedan | details |
| Banten | Rano Karno | Wahidin Halim | details |
| Gorontalo | Rusli Habibie | | |
| West Sulawesi | Anwar Adnan Saleh | Ali Baal Masdar | |
| West Papua | Abraham Octavianus Atururi | Dominggus Mandacan | |

Note: name in italics indicate incumbents who ran for re-election

=== Mayoral ===
| City | Province |
|---|---|
| Banda Aceh | Aceh |
| Lhokseumawe | Aceh |
| Langsa | Aceh |
| Sabang | Aceh |
| Tebing Tinggi | North Sumatra |
| Payakumbuh | West Sumatra |
| Pekanbaru | Riau |
| Cimahi | West Java |
| Tasikmalaya | West Java |
| Salatiga | Central Java |
| Yogyakarta | Yogyakarta Special Region |
| Batu | East Java |
| Kupang | East Nusa Tenggara |
| Singkawang | West Kalimantan |
| Kendari | Southeast Sulawesi |
| Ambon | Maluku |
| Jayapura | Papua |
| Sorong | West Papua |

=== Regent ===
| Regency | Province |
|---|---|
| Aceh Besar | Aceh |
| North Aceh | Aceh |
| East Aceh | Aceh |
| Aceh Jaya | Aceh |
| Bener Meriah | Aceh |
| Pidie | Aceh |
| Simeulue | Aceh |
| Aceh Singkil | Aceh |
| Bireuën | Aceh |
| Southwest Aceh | Aceh |
| Southeast Aceh | Aceh |
| Gayo Lues | Aceh |
| West Aceh | Aceh |
| Nagan Raya | Aceh |
| Central Aceh | Aceh |
| Aceh Tamiang | Aceh |
| Central Tapanuli | North Sumatra |
| Mentawai Islands | West Sumatra |
| Kampar | Riau |
| Muaro Jambi | Jambi |
| Sarolangun | Jambi |
| Tebo | Jambi |
| Musi Banyuasin | South Sumatra |
| Mesuji | Lampung |
| West Lampung | Lampung |
| Tulang Bawang | Lampung |
| West Tulang Bawang | Lampung |
| Bekasi | West Java |
| Banjarnegara | Central Java |
| Batang | Central Java |
| Jepara | Central Java |
| Pati | Central Java |
| Cilacap | Central Java |
| Brebes | Central Java |
| Kulon Progo | Yogyakarta Special Region |
| Pringsewu | Yogyakarta Special Region |
| Buleleng | Bali |
| East Flores | East Nusa Tenggara |
| Lembata | East Nusa Tenggara |
| Landak | West Kalimantan |
| South Barito | Central Kalimantan |
| West Kotawaringin | Central Kalimantan |
| North Hulu Sungai | South Kalimantan |
| Barito Kuala | South Kalimantan |
| Banggai Islands | Central Sulawesi |
| Buol | Central Sulawesi |
| Bolaang Mongondow | North Sulawesi |
| Sangihe Islands | North Sulawesi |
| Takalar | South Sulawesi |
| Bombana | Southeast Sulawesi |
| North Kolaka | Southeast Sulawesi |
| Buton | Southeast Sulawesi |
| Central Buton | Southeast Sulawesi |
| South Buton | Southeast Sulawesi |
| West Muna | Southeast Sulawesi |
| Boalemo | Gorontalo |
| West Seram | Maluku |
| Tanimbar Islands | Maluku |
| Central Maluku | Maluku |
| Buru | Maluku |
| Morotai Island | North Maluku |
| Central Halmahera | North Maluku |
| Nduga | Papua |
| Lanny Jaya | Papua |
| Sarmi | Papua |
| Mappi | Papua |
| Tolikara | Papua |
| Yapen Islands | Papua |
| Jayapura | Papua |
| Intan Jaya | Papua |
| Puncak Jaya | Papua |
| Dogiyai | Papua |
| Tambrauw | West Papua |
| Maybrat | West Papua |
| Sorong | West Papua |
