= List of incumbent regional heads and deputy regional heads in Banten =

The following is an article about the list of Regional Heads and Deputy Regional Heads in 8 regencies/cities in Banten who are currently still serving.

== List ==
Regency/ City	Photo of the Regent/ Mayor	Regent/ Mayor	Photo of Deputy Regent/ Mayor	Deputy Regent/ Mayor	Taking Office	End of Office (Planned)	Ref.
Lebak; Regency List of Regents/Deputy Regents		Mochamad Hasbi Asyidiki Jayabaya		Amir Hamzah	20 February 2025	20 February 2030	
Pandeglang; Regency List of Regents/Deputy Regents		Dewi Setiani		Iing Andri Supriadi	20 February 2025	20 February 2030	
Serang; Regency List of Regents/Deputy Regents		Ratu Rachmatuzakiyah		Najib Hamas	27 May 2025	27 May 2030	
Tangerang; Regency List of Regents/Deputy Regents		Maesyal Rasyid		Intan Nurul Hikmah	20 February 2025	20 February 2030	
Cilegon; City List of Mayors/Deputy mayors		Robinsar		Fajar Hadi Prabowo	20 February 2025	20 February 2030	
Serang; City List of Mayors/Deputy mayors		Budi Rustandi		Nur Agis Aulia	20 February 2025	20 February 2030	
Tangerang; City List of Mayors/Deputy mayors		Sachrudin		Maryono Hasan	20 February 2025	20 February 2030	
South Tangerang; City List of Mayors/Deputy mayors		Benyamin Davnie		Pilar Saga Ichsan	20 February 2025	20 February 2030	

Notes

- "Commencement of office" is the inauguration date at the beginning or during the current term of office. For acting regents/mayors, it is the date of appointment or extension as acting regent/mayor.
- Based on the Constitutional Court decision Number 27/PUU-XXII/2024, the Governor and Deputy Governor, Regent and Deputy Regent, and Mayor and Deputy Mayor elected in 2020 shall serve until the inauguration of the Governor and Deputy Governor, Regent and Deputy Regent, and Mayor and Deputy Mayor elected in the 2024 national simultaneous elections as long as the term of office does not exceed 5 (five) years.

== See also ==
- Banten
