= 2017 Banten gubernatorial election =

Local election in Indonesia

- 15 February 2017
- Turnout: 60.4%
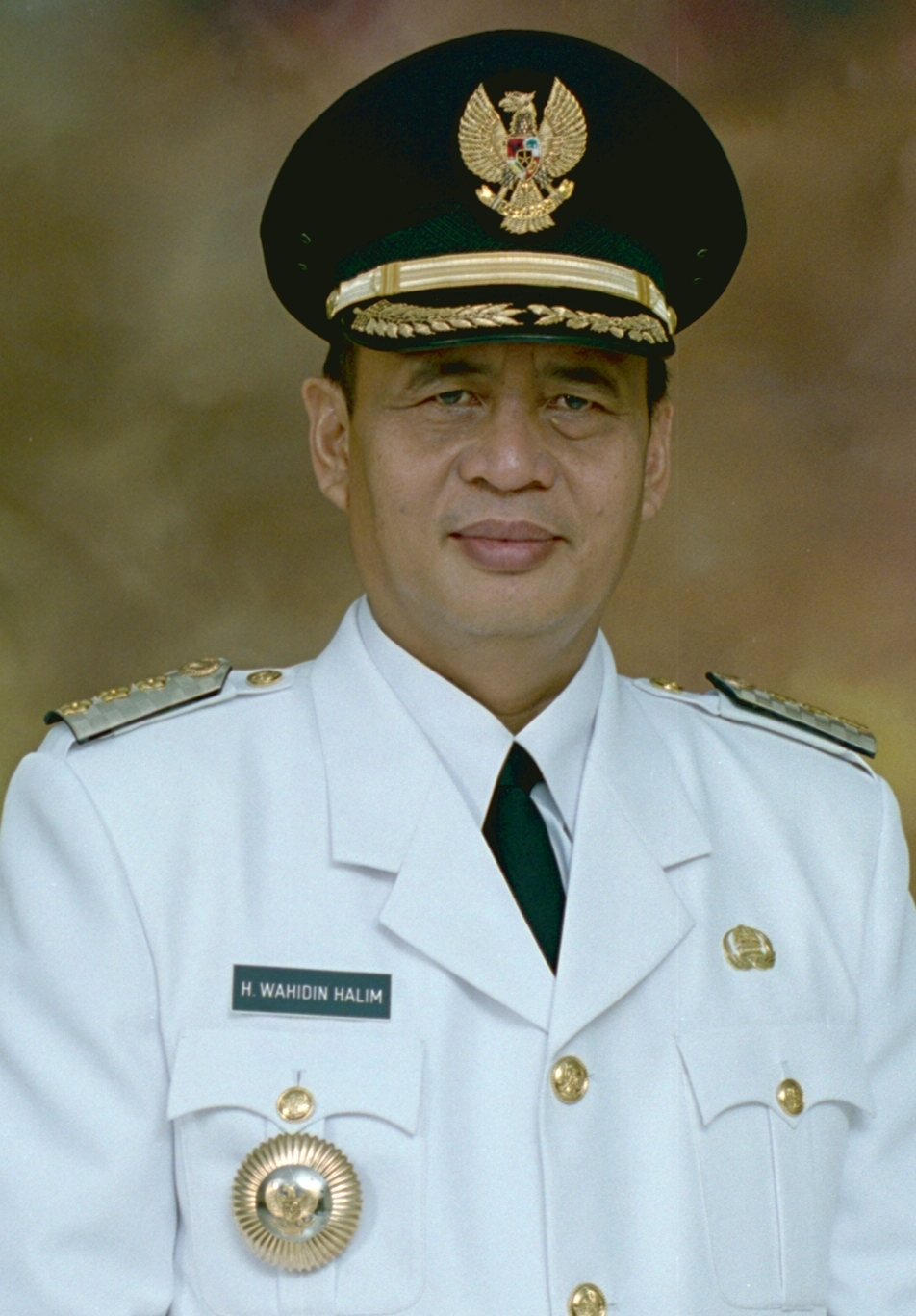

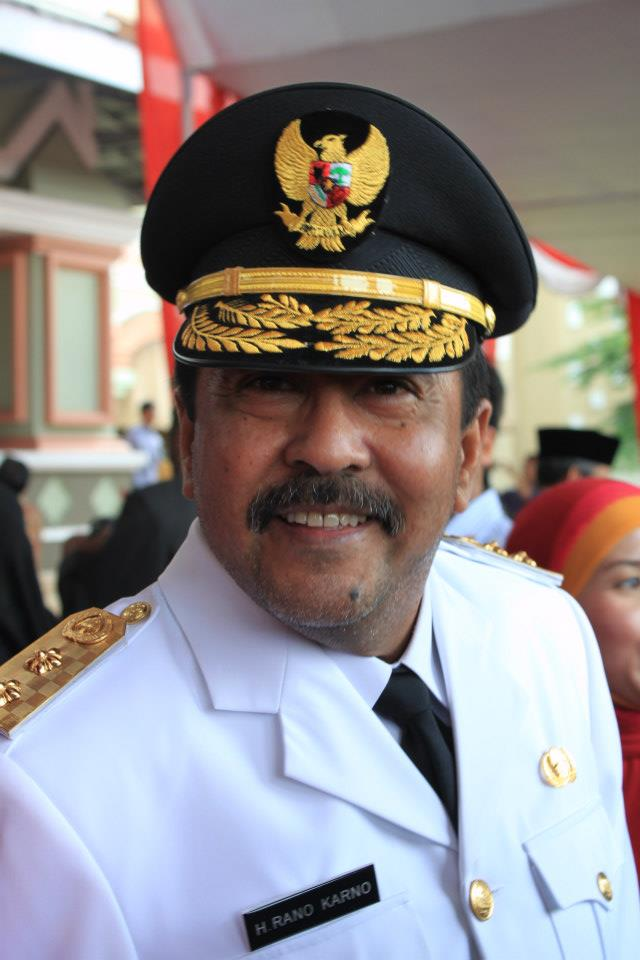
Nominee	Wahidin Halim	Rano Karno
Party	Demokrat	PDI-P
Running mate	Andika Hazrumy	Embay Mulya Syarief
Popular vote	2,411,213	2,321,323
Percentage	50.95	49.05
- Results by regency/city. Regencies/cities won by Rano Karno are in red (■), while the ones won by Wahidin Halim are in blue (■). Lighter shades (■or■) indicate a winning majority of less than 5%.
Governor before election
Rano Karno
PDI-P
Elected Governor
Wahidin Halim
Demokrat

A gubernatorial election was held on 15 February 2017 to elect the governor of Banten province for the five-year term between 2017 and 2022. The election was held simultaneously with other provincial and local elections across the country as part of the 2017 local elections. It pitted incumbent Rano Karno against People's Representative Council member and former mayor of Tangerang Wahidin Halim.

Wahidin, supported by a coalition of 6 parliamentary parties, secured a landslide victory in his former constituency at Tangerang, and defeated Rano with a margin of 90,000 votes despite losing in 6 of the other 7 regencies and cities.

== Background ==
Ratu Atut Chosiyah served as the governor of Banten - Indonesia's fifth most populous province - between 2007 and 2014, until she was arrested for a bribery scandal related to an election dispute. Some has described her family's influence in the province as a "political dynasty". 2017 marked the second time Indonesia held local elections simultaneously, after the 2015 local elections.

After some time being acting governor, former actor Rano Karno who was also Atut's deputy was sworn in the governor to replace her in August 2015. The General Election Supervisory Agency (Bawaslu) identified Banten as a vulnerable region for the 2017 election, alongside Aceh and West Papua. In particular, the body cited the strong presence of political dynasties.

== Timeline ==
Registration for the candidates opened between 28 and 30 August 2016, with the campaign period ranging from October 2016 to February 2017. The voting itself took place on 15 February 2017. The results were planned to be released in March 2017.

== Candidates ==
#	Candidate	Position	Running mate	Parties
1	Wahidin Halim	Member of People's Representative Council; Mayor of Tangerang (2008-2013)	Andika Hazrumy	Gerindra; Golkar; Demokrat; PKS; PKB; Hanura; PAN; Total: 57 DPRD seats
2	Rano Karno	Incumbent governor of Banten	Embay Mulya Syarief	PDI-P; Nasdem; PPP; Total: 28 DPRD seats

=== Opinion surveys ===
Source	Date	Sample size	Wahidin	Rano
Indo Barometer	24–28 January 2017	800	35.2	42.5
Lembaga Survei Politik	21–27 January 2017	800	39.5	32.1
Jaringan Suara Indonesia	20–24 December 2016	700	42.7	36.2
SMRC	9–14 September 2016	816	36	59

== Issues ==
Affiliation with Atut's dynasty became a major issue in the campaign. Both candidates accused each other of being affiliated with her dynasty: Rano-Embay because Rano was Atut's deputy, Wahidin-Andika because Andika is Ratu Atut's son. Atut herself voiced support for her son.

== Results ==
Votes by subdivision	Wahidin-Andika		Rano-Embay	
Votes by subdivision	Votes	%	Votes	%
Cilegon	76,480	42.36	104,070	57.64
Serang	123,803	44.62	153,638	55.38
Tangerang	508,908	66.86	252,220	33.14
South Tangerang	259,701	47.65	285,289	52.35
Lebak Regency	254,182	42.92	338,079	57.08
Pandeglang Regency	243,571	46.36	281,832	53.64
Serang Regency	365,794	55.29	295,812	44.71
Tangerang Regency	578,774	48.67	610,383	51.33
Total	2,411,213	50.95	2,321,323	49.05
Valid votes			4,732,536	60.40
Invalid votes			123,042	1.57
Registered voters			7,835,703	100

On 5 April, KPU officially announced Wahidin-Andika as the winning pair.

=== Aftermath ===
Following the defeat, PDI-P leader Megawati Soekarnoputri removed the party's leaders in Banten. Rano brought the election to the Constitutional Court, which rejected his lawsuit (citing that the difference in votes was too large) and declared the election valid. On 12 May 2017, Wahidin was sworn in as the new governor.
