= Mohammad Masduki =

Indonesien civil servant and politician (1944–2023)

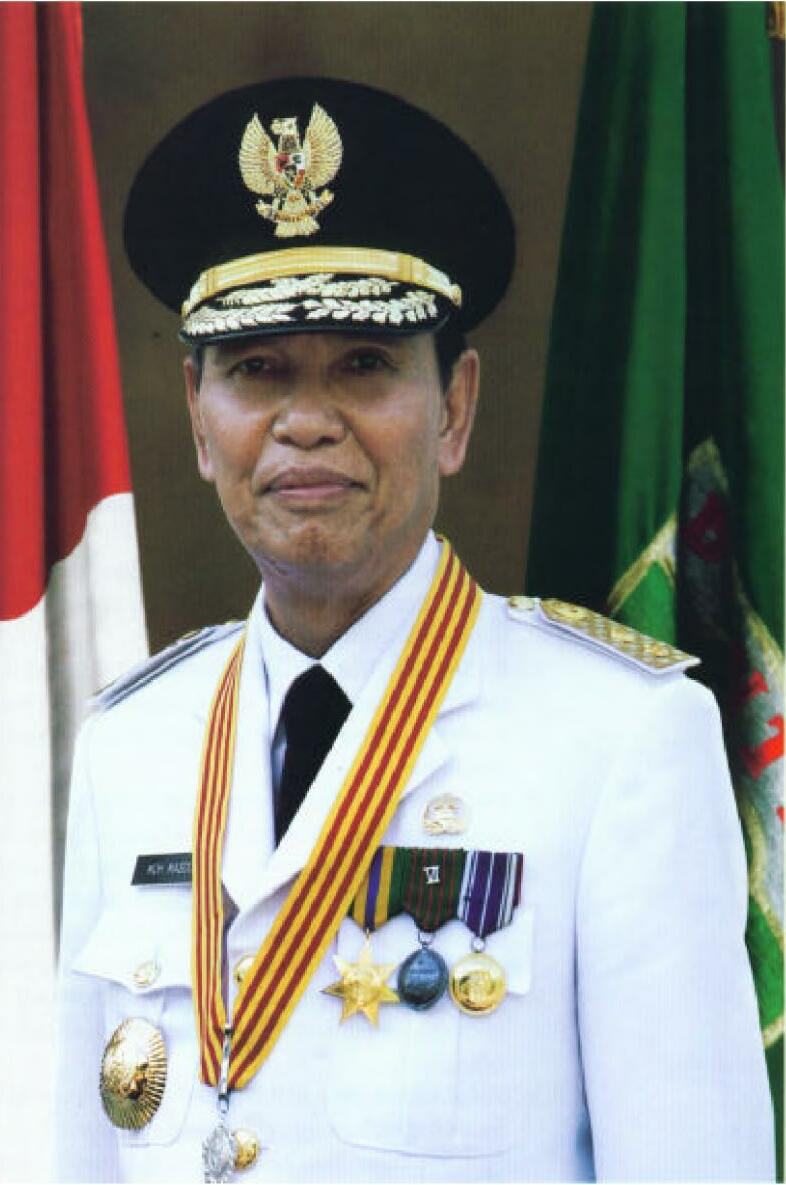

Vice Governor of Banten
- In office 11 January 2007 – 11 January 2012
- Governor: Ratu Atut Chosiyah
- Preceded by: Ratu Atut Chosiyah
- Succeeded by: Rano Karno

Mayor of Depok
- In office September 1991 – June 1992
- Preceded by: Abdul Wachyan
- Succeeded by: Sofyan Safari Hamim

Personal details
- Born: 7 July 1944 Tangerang, West Java, Japanese-occupied Dutch East Indies
- Died: 22 June 2023 (aged 78) Alam Sutera, South Tangerang, Banten, Indonesia
- Spouse: Dedeh Syahrawati
- Parents: Sya'ban Salim (father); Siti Aminah (mother)
- Education: Academy of Home Governance; Langlangbuana University

Mohammad Masduki (7 July 1944 – 22 June 2023) was an Indonesian civil servant and politician who served as the mayor of Depok from 1991 until 1992 and the Vice Governor of Banten from 2007 until 2012. Masduki had previously worked in West Java's provincial government and held various offices inside the regional government of Bogor, Tangerang, and West Java.

== Early life and education ==
Masduki was born on 7 July 1944 in Tangerang, a district with a strong Islamic education background, during the Japanese occupation of the Dutch East Indies. His father, Sya’ban Salim, was a kyai and the chief of Tangerang's Islamic court, while his mother, Siti Aminah, was a religious teacher.

As a child, Masduki began his education at the Tangerang State Elementary School in 1956 and continued studying at the Tangerang Junior High School. He also pursued religious education at the Al-Husna madrasa, where graduated in 1960. He then studied at the Tangerang Public High School until his graduation in 1963.

Masduki decided to pursue a career as a civil servant shortly after graduating from high school. He attended a two-year civil servant course and graduated in 1965. He then pursued further education as a civil servant at the Academy of Home Governance (APDN, Akademi Pemerintahan Dalam Negeri) and at the Governance Sciences Institute (IIP, Insitut Ilmu Pemerintahan), where he graduated in 1968 and 1976 respectively. Around 2004, Masduki received a postgraduate degree in governance sciences from the Langlangbuana University.

== Career ==
Masduki started his career as a staff member in the training and development Ministry of Home Affairs in 1965. He was then transferred to the Tangerang regional government a year after and became the head of licensing section in the regional government. Upon completing his education at APDN, Masduki was assigned to various subdistricts in Tangerang as the chief's subdistrict. He became the chief of Krojo subdistrict from 1969 to 1971, Balaraja subdistrict from 1971 to 1972 and from 1977 to 1978, and the Batu Ceper subdistrict from 1972 to 1977.

After being entrusted to govern subdistricts in Tangerang, Masduki returned to the Tangerang regional government and was appointed to various positions, such as head of welfare affairs from 1978 until 1979, head of economic affairs from 1979 until 1984, and head of regional income from 1984 until 1988. He then became the first assistant to the regional secretary of Tangerang until 1991.

In September 1991, Masduki was appointed the administrative mayor of Depok, replacing Abdul Wachyan. Despite his position as mayor, the city's status as an administrative city meant that he was still subordinate to the Regent of Bogor. Masduki did not hold this position for long, as he was already replaced in June 1992. He then became the regional secretary of Bogor and was elevated to the position of Bogor's vice regent—a newly established position—in December 1994.

Upon serving at regional level, Masduki was promoted to the provincial government of West Java, where he became the province's head of regional income bureau in 1997. Masduki was in this position for around three years until he became the assistant to the governor for social welfare affairs. He then became the head of the social services from 2004 until his retirement in 2006.

Masduki was a candidate for the vice governor of Banten in 2006, running alongside Ratu Atut Chosiyah as governor. Their candidacy was supported by Golkar, Indonesian Democratic Party of Struggle, and several minor political parties. The pair won the election held on 6 December 2006 with 40.15% of the vote. Three other candidate pairs rejected the results and filed lawsuits against various government bodies, including a legal action by Marissa Haque against president Susilo Bambang Yudhoyono. However, the government rejected the lawsuits and confirmed the election results. Masduki was installed as vice governor, along with Ratu Atut, on 11 January 2007. As the vice governor, Masduki oversaw the relocation of Situ Gintung residents displaced by flooding in 2009. He was replaced by Rano Karno on 11 January 2012.

== Personal life and death ==
Masduki was married to Dedeh Syahrawati. Dedeh died in Serpong, South Tangerang, on 26 May 2020 at the age of 73.

Masduki died on the morning of 22 June 2023 at a private hospital in Alam Sutera, South Tangerang, due to liver complications. He was 78. His body was interred at a family cemetery in Karawaci, Tangerang.
