= 2024 Tangerang regency election =

- 27 November 2024
- Turnout: 67.14% (▲5.61pp)
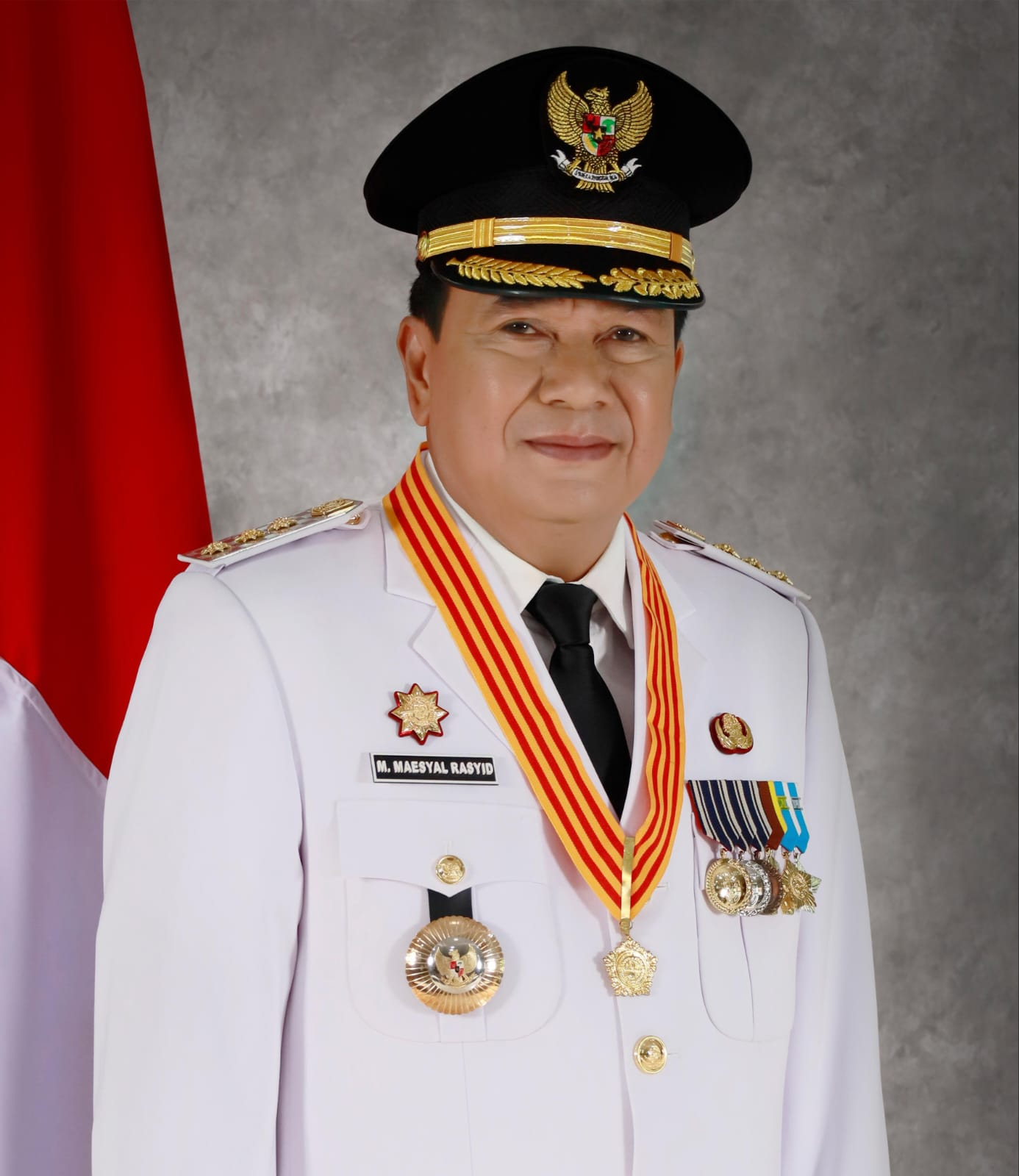

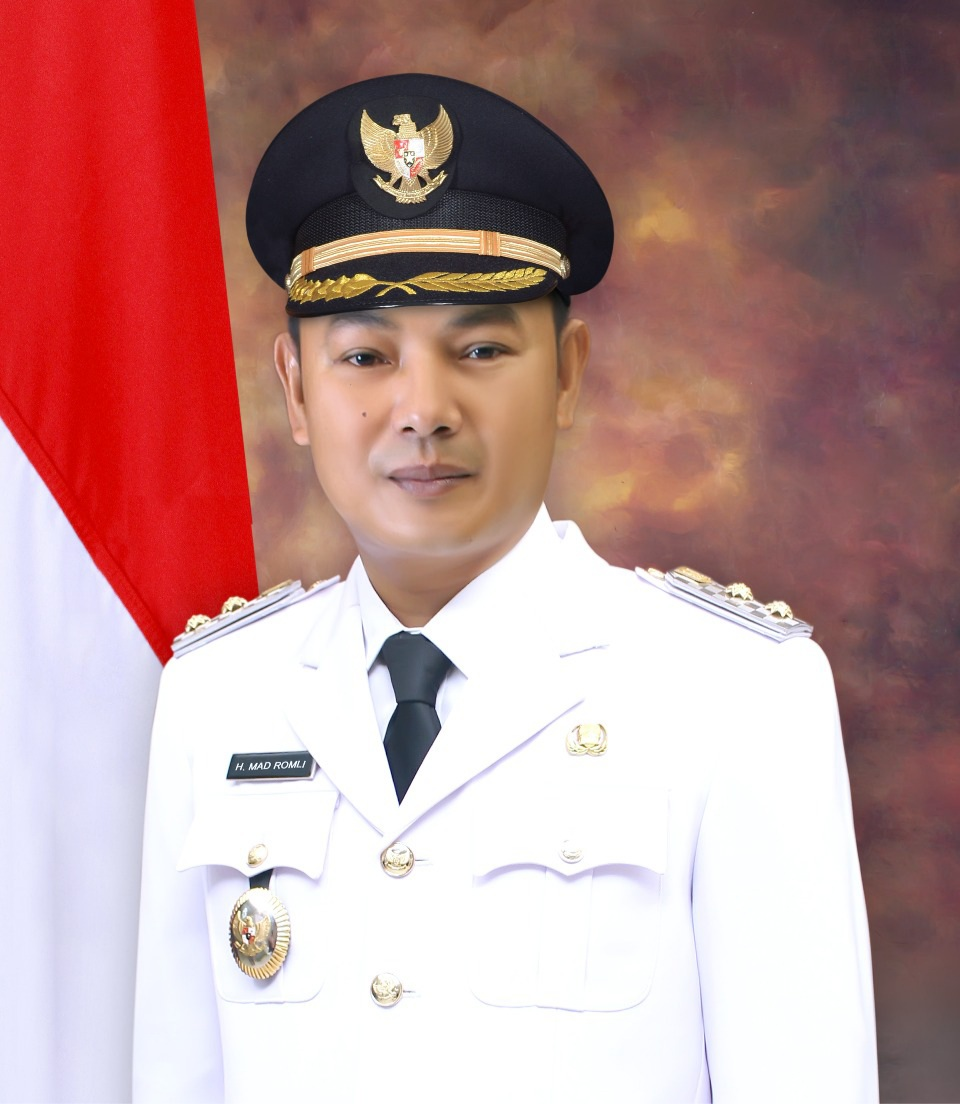
Candidate	Maesyal Rasyid	Mad Romli
Party	Gerindra	PDI-P
Alliance	KIM Plus	–
Running mate	Intan Nurul Hikmah	Irvansyah
Popular vote	995,486	472,155
Percentage	65.14%	30.90%
- Results by district and subdistrict (Interactive version)
Regent before election
Andi Ony Prihartono (acting)
Independent
Elected Regent
Maesyal Rasyid
Gerindra

The 2024 Tangerang regency election was held on 27 November 2024 as part of nationwide local elections to elect the regent of Tangerang Regency for a five-year term. The previous election was held in 2018. Maesyal Rasyid won the election in a landslide with 65% of the vote. He defeated former Vice Regent Mad Romli, who received 30%.

== Electoral system ==
The election, like other local elections in 2024, follow the first-past-the-post system where the candidate with the most votes wins the election, even if they do not win a majority. It is possible for a candidate to run uncontested, in which case the candidate is still required to win a majority of votes "against" an "empty box" option. Should the candidate fail to do so, the election will be repeated on a later date.

== Candidates ==
According to electoral regulations, in order to qualify for the election, candidates were required to secure support from a political party or a coalition of parties controlling 11 seats in the Tangerang Regional House of Representatives (DPRD). As no parties won 11 or more seats in the 2024 legislative election, all political parties must form coalitions in order to nominate a candidate. Candidates may alternatively demonstrate support in form of photocopies of identity cards, which in Tangerang's case corresponds to 153 thousand copies. One such candidate, Zulkarnain, registered with the General Elections Commission (KPU) and submitted the required proofs of support. His candidacy is pending KPU verification of documents.

The previous regent, Ahmed Zaki Iskandar, had served two full terms and was therefore ineligible to run in the regency election.

=== Potential ===
The following are individuals who have either been publicly mentioned as a potential candidate by a political party in the DPRD, publicly declared their candidacy with press coverage, or considered as a potential candidate by media outlets:

- Mad Romli (Golkar), previous vice regent.
- Moch Maesyal Rasyid, regional secretary of Tangerang Regency.
- Zulkarnain, chairman of the Tangerang Regency branch of the Pemuda Pancasila organization.

== Political map ==
Following the 2024 Indonesian legislative election, nine political parties are represented in the Tangerang Regency DPRD:

Political parties	Seat count
Party of Functional Groups (Golkar)	9 / 55
Indonesian Democratic Party of Struggle (PDI-P)	9 / 55
Great Indonesia Movement Party (Gerindra)	6 / 55
National Awakening Party (PKB)	6 / 55
Prosperous Justice Party (PKS)	6 / 55
Democratic Party (Demokrat)	6 / 55
NasDem Party	5 / 55
National Mandate Party (PAN)	5 / 55
United Development Party (PPP)	3 / 55

== Results ==
Candidate	Running mate	Party	Votes	%
Maesyal Rasyid	Intan Nurul Hikmah	Gerindra Party	995,486	65.14
Mad Romli	Irvansyah	Indonesian Democratic Party of Struggle	472,155	30.90
Zulkarnain	Lerru Yustira	Independent	60,544	3.96
Total			1,528,185	100.00
Valid votes			1,528,185	96.07
Invalid/blank votes			62,472	3.93
Total votes			1,590,657	100.00
Registered voters/turnout			2,369,021	67.14
Source: KPU

Candidate vote share by district and subdistrict
Mad Romli–Irvansyah

Maesyal–Intan

Zulkarnain–Lerru
