= Ismet Iskandar =

Indonesian politician (1948–2024)

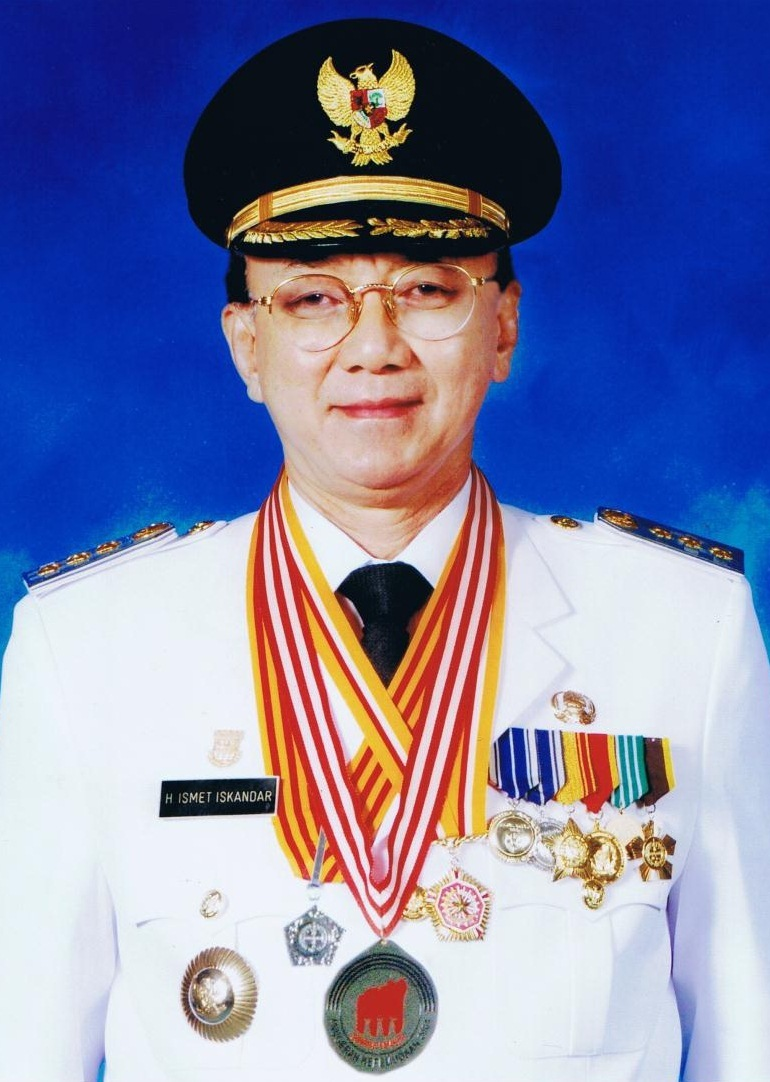

Regent of Tangerang
- In office 22 March 2003 – 22 March 2013
- Preceded by: Agus Djunara
- Succeeded by: Ahmed Zaki Iskandar

Personal details
- Born: 2 May 1948; Rangkasbitung, West Java, Indonesia
- Died: 15 October 2024 (aged 76); Tangerang, Banten, Indonesia
- Political party: Golkar

Ismet Iskandar (2 May 1948 – 15 October 2024) was an Indonesian politician who served as the regent of Tangerang Regency between 2003 and 2013.

== Life and career ==
Prior to becoming regent, Iskandar served as municipal secretary under regent Agus Djunara. Iskandar was elected by Tangerang's municipal council as regent in 2003, with Norodom Soekarno as running mate. He was sworn in as regent on 22 March 2003. During the first term, a number of road construction projects in Tangerang Regency commenced, which connected parts of the regency, including initiating the Serpong–Balaraja Toll Road project.

The carving of South Tangerang out from the regency occurred during Iskandar's regent term. Early on in his term, Iskandar opposed the carveout, citing that the region was not prepared to be an independent municipality and predicted that it could only occur in the 2010s. Nevertheless, by 2006 the new municipality had been approved by the regency's legislature.

Additionally, in 2005, Iskandar approved plans for a land reclamation project in the Dadap neighborhood, resulting in the intervention by the environmental working group in the People's Representative Council, and eventually the project was halted.

Following the 2008 regency election, Iskandar secured his second term with artist Rano Karno now as his deputy. He was succeeded in 2013 by his son, Ahmed Zaki Iskandar. He was a member of Golkar.

Iskandar died at Tangerang Public Hospital on 15 October 2024, at the age of 76.
