= Andika Hazrumy =

Indonesian politician (born 1985)

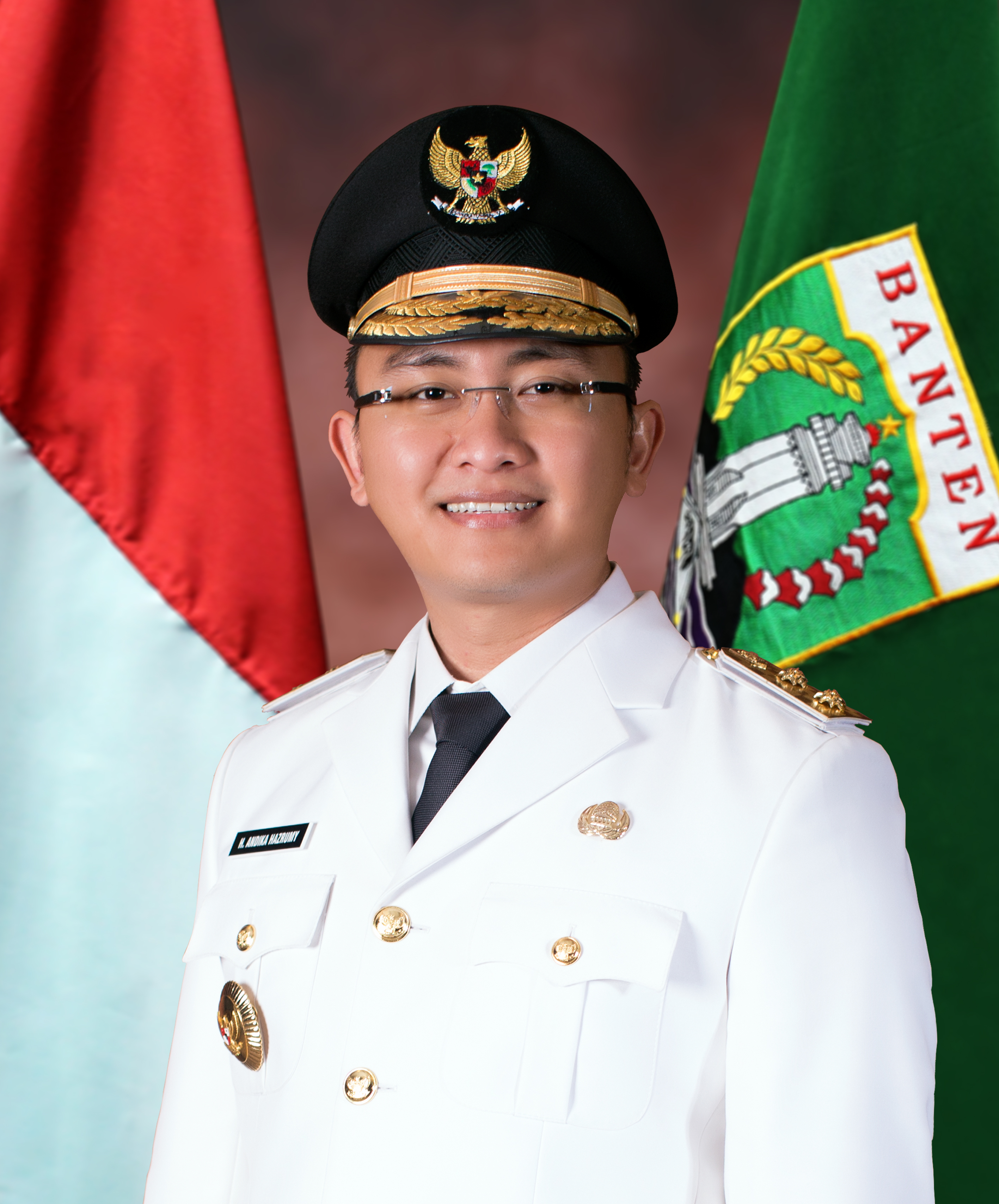

Vice Governor of Banten
- In office 12 May 2017 – 12 May 2022
- President: Joko Widodo
- Governor: Wahidin Halim
- Preceded by: Rano Karno
- Succeeded by: Dimyati Natakusumah

Personal details
- Born: December 16, 1985 (age 40) Bandung, West Java
- Party: Golkar
- Spouse: Adde Rosi Khoerunnisa
- Parents: Hikmat Tomet (father); Ratu Atut Chosiyah (mother)
- Profession: Politician

Andika Hazrumy (born 16 December 1985) was the Vice Governor of Banten from 2017 to 2022. He is the son of former Governor of Banten Ratu Atut Chosiyah.

== Political career ==
In 2009, Hazrumy started his political career when he was elected as a member of the Regional Representative Council.

At the 2014 legislative election, Hazrumy was elected as a member of the People's Representative Council.

In 2017, he ran as the running mate of Wahidin Halim in the 2017 Banten gubernatorial election. The pair defeated incumbent Rano Karno and Hazrumy was elected as the deputy governor for the term 2017–2022.
