= Sachrudin =

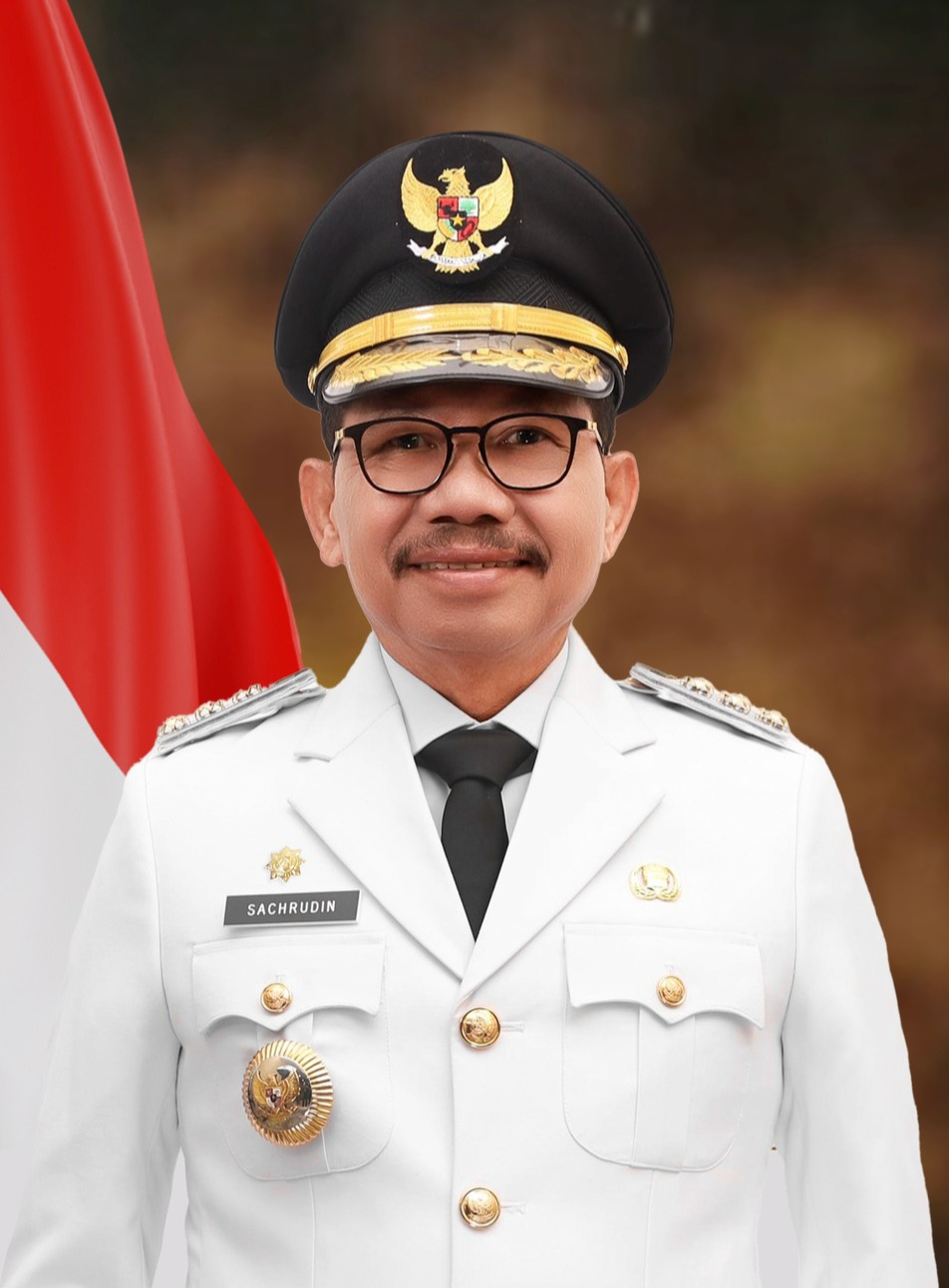
- Official portrait, 2025

Mayor of Tangerang
- Incumbent
- Assumed office 20 February 2025
- Preceded by: Arief R. Wismansyah

Vice Mayor of Tangerang
- In office 24 December 2013 – 26 December 2023
- Mayor: Arief R. Wismansyah
- Preceded by: Arief R. Wismansyah
- Succeeded by: Maryono Hasan

Personal details
- Born: 6 November 1961 (age 64) Tangerang, West Java, Indonesia
- Party: Golkar

Sachrudin (born 6 November 1961) is an Indonesian politician of the Golkar party and former bureaucrat who has been the mayor of Tangerang since 20 February 2025. He was previously the city's vice mayor under Arief Rachadiono Wismansyah for two terms between 2013 and 2023, and had served in the city's government since 1996 before that.

== Early life ==
Sachrudin was born on 6 November 1961 at the village of Gondrong, today part of Cipondoh district of Tangerang. He studied in Tangerang, completing elementary school at Cipondoh in 1975, middle school in 1979, and high school in 1982.

== Career ==
After completing high school, Sachrudin briefly worked as a factory worker at Surya Toto, a closet and urinoir manufacturer. He then accepted a job as a security guard at a public hospital in Tangerang in 1982. The following year, he was accepted as a civil servant at the public hospital where he was a security guard. He studied in his free time and received a bachelor's in public administration from the Syekh Yusuf Islamic University Tangerang in 1992. In 1996, he became a staffer at the city's health service.

By 2000, Sachrudin had been appointed as lurah (head of an urban village) within Tangerang, and in 2005 he was appointed camat (district head) of Cipondoh. He would become camat of Pinang in 2009 until 2013.

=== Politics ===
In 2013, Sachrudin became the running mate of Arief Rachadiono Wismansyah in Tangerang's 2013 mayoral election. Their candidacy was initially disqualified by the city's General Elections Commission citing an administrative issue – civil servants were required to obtain written permission to run in the election and Sachrudin failed to provide one. This disqualification resulted in protests by Arief and Sachrudin's supporters. The incumbent mayor Wahidin Halim, who had refused Sachrudin's resignation, cited procedural issues in that Sachrudin had resigned after registering for the election instead of the other way around. Following an Election Organization Ethics Council decision which removed the city's election commissioners, their candidacy was restored. In the ensuing four-way race, Arief and Sachrudin were elected with 340,810 votes (49%), and Sachrudin was sworn in as vice mayor on 24 December 2013.

Arief and Sachrudin was reelected unopposed in 2018. Their terms expired on 26 December 2023. In the 2024 Tangerang mayoral election, Sachrudin ran with the support of Golkar, PDI-P, PPP, Demokrat, and several non-parliamentary parties. He won the three-way election, winning 394,137 votes (51.9%). He was sworn in on 20 February 2025. As mayor, Sachrudin in May 2025 waived fares for the city's bus service for students.

Sachrudin is a member of Golkar, serving as head of the party's Tangerang branch in 2020–2025.

== Personal life ==
He is married to Masturoh, and has five children.
