= Gita Cinta dari SMA =

1979 film by Arizal

- Directed by: Arizal
- Written by: Eddy D. Iskandar
- Based on: Gita Cinta dari SMA by Eddy D. Iskandar
- Produced by: Tommy Indra
- Starring: Rano Karno; Yessi Gusman
- Cinematography: Harry Susanto
- Edited by: Benny M.S., B.
- Music by: Guruh Soekarnoputra
- Distributed by: Tiga Sinar Mutiara Film
- Release date: 1979
- Country: Indonesia
- Language: Indonesian

Gita Cinta dari SMA (Love Song in High School) is a 1979 Indonesian film directed by Arizal and starring Rano Karno and Yessi Gusman.

== Plot ==
Galih (Rano Karno) and Ratna (Yessi Gusman) are two high school students who excel at everything they do; they are popular and receive good grades. Soon they begin falling in love. Despite Ratna's father objecting to their relationship, they continue to meet in secret. When Ratna's father finds out, he attempts to arrange for her to marry someone else. With Ratna receiving support from the other female members of her family, this fails; Ratna and Galih are able to continue dating.

== Production ==
Gita Cinta dari SMA was based on Eddy D. Iskandar's 1978 novel of the same name. Rano Karno and Yessi Gusman were cast as Galih and Ratna, respectively; such was their chemistry that after the release of the film rumours circulated that the two were dating.

Pop music singer Chrisye had a cameo as the singer of "Galih dan Ratna" ("Galih and Ratna"). The role was meant to further the marketing of his upcoming album Puspa Indah, which featured both "Galih dan Ratna" and another song from the film, "Gita Cinta" ("Love Song").

== Release and reception ==
Gita Cinta dari SMA was released in 1979. FilmIndonesia.org, an Indonesian film database, notes that Gita Cinta dari SMA was the third most viewed Indonesian film in Jakarta in 1979, selling 162,050 tickets. In 1980 it was followed by a sequel, Puspa Indah di Taman Hati (Beautiful Flower in the Heart's Garden).

== Adaptations ==
In 2004, a soap opera starring Paundra Karna as Galih and Ratna Galih as Ratna was released by Indosiar. Its success led Iskandar to republish his original novel.

A stage musical adaptation of the film, entitled Gita Cinta: The Musical (Love Song: The Musical), was run in Ismail Marzuki Cultural Centre in Central Jakarta from 19 to 21 March. Directed by Ari Tulang and with music provided by Dian HP Orchestra, the play required six days of casting in October 2009 and five months of preparation. Each performance involved forty actors, with rotating leads to ensure they would not be overexhausted; Gilang Dirgahari and Millane Fernandez played one pair of Galih and Ratna, while Mario Ginanjar and Mytha Lestari played the other. Dian HP noted that she was interested in working on the musical as the film was one of her childhood favourites.
