= Agus Djunara =

Former Indonesian politician and military officer

Regent of Tangerang
- In office 22 March 1998 – 22 March 2003
- Preceded by: Syaifullah Abdulrachman
- Succeeded by: Ismet Iskandar

Personal details
- Born: 2 September 1951 (age 74) Ciamis, West Java, Indonesia

Military service
- Allegiance: Indonesia
- Branch/service: Indonesian Army
- Years of service: 1974–1998
- Rank: Colonel

Agus Djunara (born 2 September 1951) is an Indonesian former politician and military officer, who served as the regent of Tangerang Regency between 1998 and 2003. After the end of his regent tenure, he became involved in a fraud case, and was jailed briefly in Malaysia and later in Indonesia.

== Career ==
Djunara graduated from the Indonesian Military Academy in 1974. Until 1995, he served in the infantry, rising up to the rank of deputy regimental commander. After 1995, he took office assignments until his move to bureaucratic career with the rank of colonel.

In March 1998, Djunara was elected as regent of Tangerang after winning in a municipal council vote, being sworn in on 22 March 1998. As regent, Djunara was involved in a case where he was accused of harassing journalists. His tenure also saw the movement of the regency's seat from Tangerang city to Tigaraksa in 2000, which had legally been mandated since 1995.

After the end of his tenure, Djunara and his wife Andi Putri Zahara became involved in a number of fraud cases where they claimed to be connected to religious figures and demanded money for blessings, defrauding Rp 18 billion between 2003 and 2004. By 2004, they had escaped to Malaysia before a police report could be made, and there they also defrauded Malaysians with the same modus operandi. They were arrested by the Malaysian police in 2007, jailed for two years, and returned to Indonesia where they conducted another fraud. They were arrested again by the Jakarta Metropolitan Police in December 2010.
