= Maesyal Rasyid =

Indonesian politician and bureaucrat (born 1965)

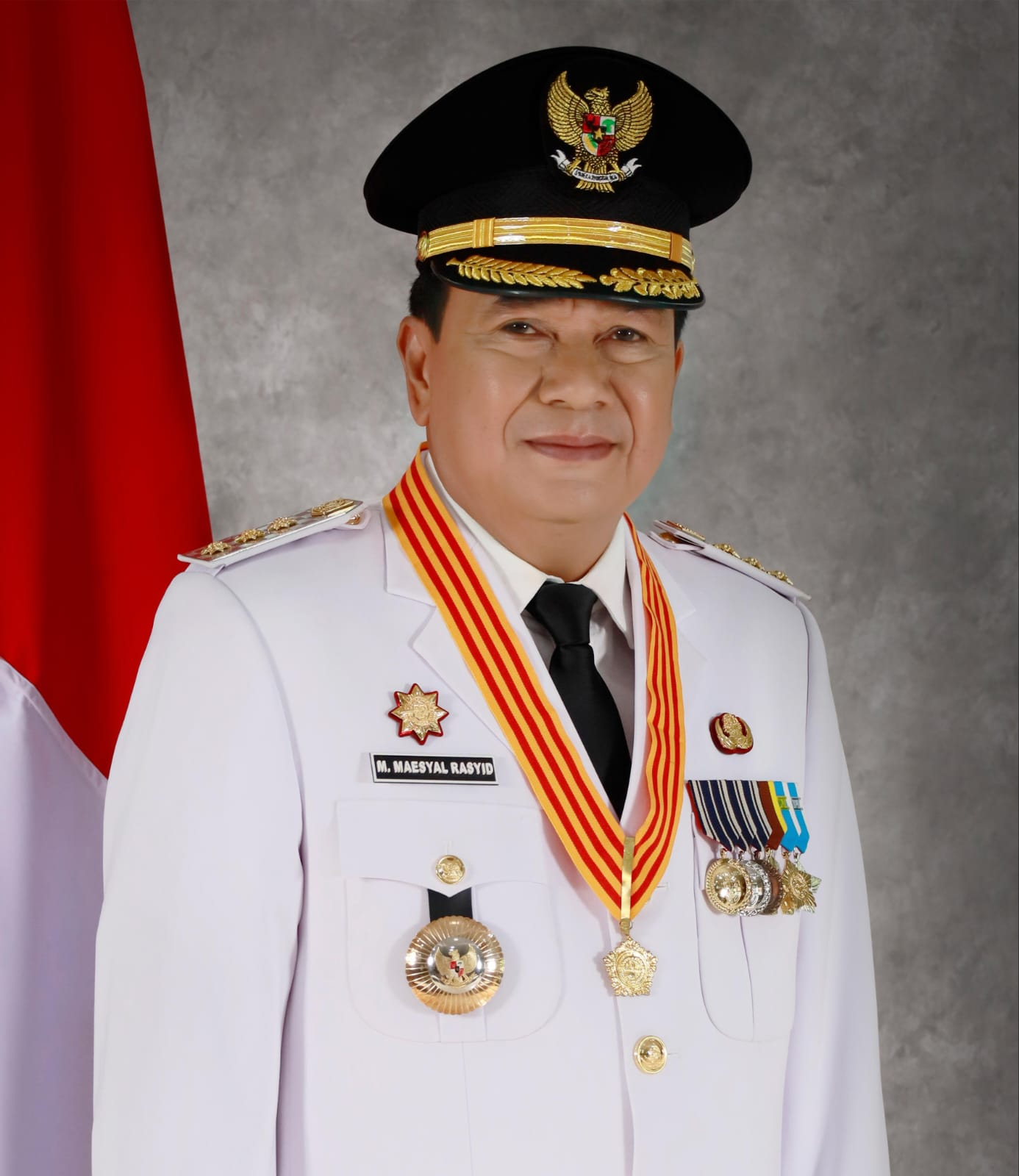
- Official portrait, 2025

Regent of Tangerang
- Incumbent
- Assumed office 20 February 2025
- Deputy: Intan Nurul Hikmah
- Preceded by: Ahmed Zaki Iskandar

Personal details
- Born: 17 May 1965 (age 61) Tangerang, West Java, Indonesia (now Banten)
- Party: Gerindra
- Education: Academy of Home Affairs Governance (Drs.); Syekh Yusuf Islamic University Tangerang (Drs.); Mandala College of Administrative Sciences (M.Si)

Mochamad Maesyal Rasyid (born 17 May 1965), also referred to as Rudi Maesyal, is an Indonesian politician and bureaucrat who is serving as the regent of Tangerang since 2025. A member of the Gerindra Party, he previously served as in the regional civil service and was the regional secretary of Tangerang from 2017 to 2024. He also served as a district head between 2000 and 2008.

== Early life and career ==
Mochamad Maesyal Rasyid was born on 17 May 1965 in Tangerang, West Java (now Banten). Maesyal received a primary and secondary education in Tangerang, though he attended a high school in Jakarta. He was a fan of football and played for Persita Tangerang at the Soeratin Cup. After graduating in 1983, Maesyal went to the Academy of Home Affairs Governance and later Syekh Yusuf Islamic University Tangerang, graduating in 1989 and 1993 respectively. He would also attend the Mandala College of Administrative Sciences, graduating in 2005.

In 1989, Maesyal began his career as a bureaucrat in Ciputat. Five years later, he was appointed acting subdistrict head of Sawah Baru. Thereafter, he was transferred to the regional revenue service. He was promoted to district secretary of Pakuhaji in 1996. Maesyal would serve in the position until 1999, when he was appointed the district secretary of Ciputat. He was appointed the district head of Balaraja in 2000.

However, he only served for a year before being transferred again to become head of the land and building tax subdivision of the regional revenue service. After only three months, Maesyal became the district head of Tigaraksa (2001–2003), Kosambi (2003–2006), and Curug (2006–2008). After 2008, he remained as a bureaucrat and served in various positions, culminating in his appointment by Ahmed Zaki Iskandar to the position of regional secretary of Tangerang by in 2017, replacing Iskandar Mirsad.

== Regent of Tangerang ==
In 2023, Maesyal was speculated to be one of three candidates for acting regent of Tangerang. A year later, on 8 July 2024, he announced that he was resigning as regional secretary to run for regent. In the election, he chose Intan Nurul Hikmah as his running mate. The pair were supported by the Advanced Indonesia Coalition Plus, consisting of six parties: Gerindra, NasDem, PKS, PKB, PAN, and Golkar. He won the 2024 Tangerang regency election for a five-year term, winning with 995,486 (65.14%) votes out of more than 1.5 million cast.
