= Djoko Munandar =

Indonesian politician (1948–2008)

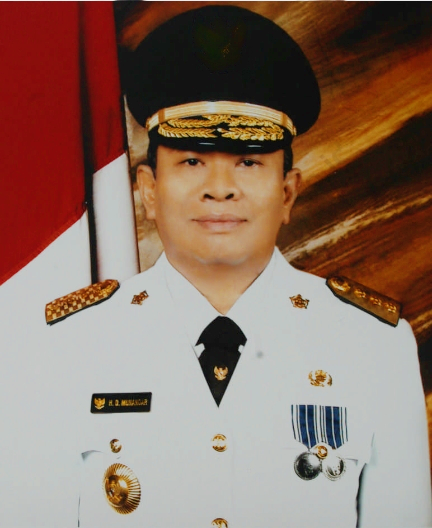
- Munandar as Governor of Banten

Governor of Banten
- In office 11 January 2002 – 10 October 2005
- Preceded by: Position created Hakamuddin Djamal (Acting)
- Succeeded by: Ratu Atut Chosiyah

Personal details
- Born: 15 March 1947 or 1948
- Died: 5 December 2008 (aged 60/61); Serang, Banten, Indonesia

Djoko Munandar (15 March 1948 – 5 December 2008) was an Indonesian politician who served as the first elected governor of Banten, serving between 2002 and 2005. His tenure ended following a graft investigation in 2005 and he was sentenced to two years in prison, although he was later found not guilty by the Supreme Court of Indonesia upon appeal.

== Early life ==
Munandar was born on either 15 March 1947 in Surakarta, or 15 March 1948 in Cirebon. After completing high school in 1966, Munandar registered to be a cadet at the Indonesian Military Academy in Magelang, but his application was rejected and he instead enrolled at the public works engineering academy (ATPU) in Bandung one year later. He was a part of the student body during his time in ATPU.

== Career ==
After graduating, Munandar became a civil servant within the Ministry of Public Works' planning department, initially as a supervisor. He worked within the Jatiluhur Dam project authority, and then managed several projects in Karawang and Bekasi. While a civil servant, he obtained his bachelor's degree in civil engineering from the Bandung Institute of Technology in 1981. By 1987, he was granted a scholarship to study for a master's degree in water management in Chennai, India. He opted to move to Serang in 1999 and began participating in politics, being elected as the deputy mayor of Cilegon. He also joined the United Development Party and was appointed as the party's provincial chair.

At Banten's inaugural gubernatorial election on 3 December 2001, Munandar ran as a candidate with Ratu Atut Chosiyah as his running mate. The pair won 37 votes out of the 65 votes cast by members of the Banten Regional People's Representative Council. They were sworn in on 11 January 2002. Munandar's stated plan as governor was to restart the construction of a seaport, improve road networks within the province, and attract investors with Banten's proximity to Jakarta.

== Investigation and death ==
On 17 December 2004, following a questioning, Munandar was designated as a suspect in a Rp 14 billion (USD 1.5 million) corruption case related to funding for legislators. He was formally removed from his office as governor on 10 October 2005 in relation to the investigation. Prosecutors called for Munandar to receive a four-year prison sentence, and the Serang District Court sentenced him to two years' imprisonment on 22 December 2005. His appeal to the Banten High Court was rejected and the court upheld his prison sentence on 12 June 2006. He further appealed to the Supreme Court of Indonesia, which granted his appeal and found Munandar not guilty of all charges on 8 May 2008, with the Serang District Court only receiving a formal notice in February 2009. However, Munandar had died shortly after the decision due to complications from his liver disease on 5 December 2008 in his home in Serang. At that time, he was not under arrest but was restricted from leaving Serang. He was buried in Serang.
