= 2024 Tangerang mayoral election =

- 27 November 2024
- Turnout: 58.23%
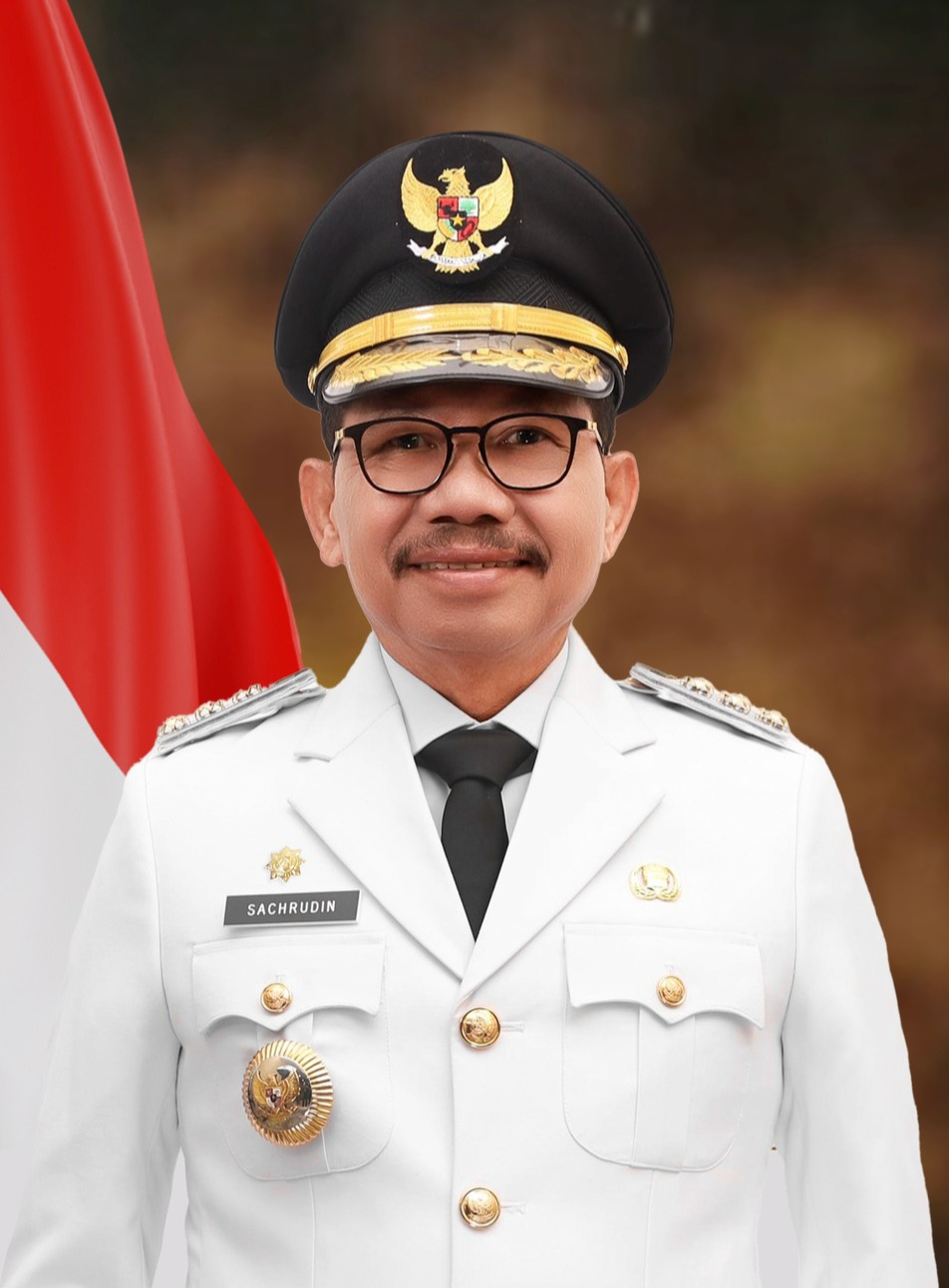

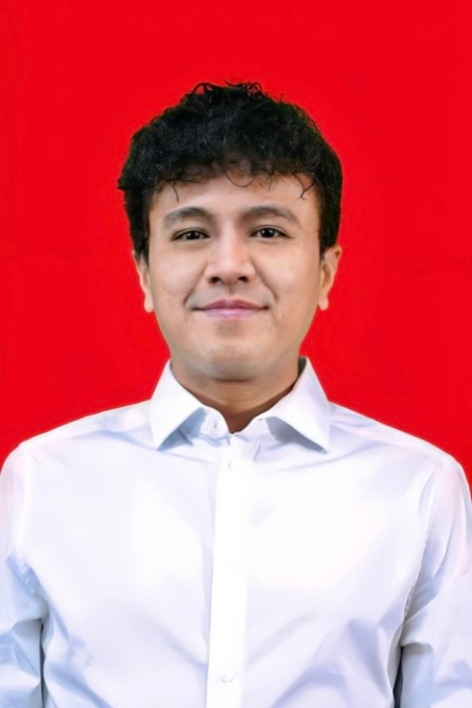

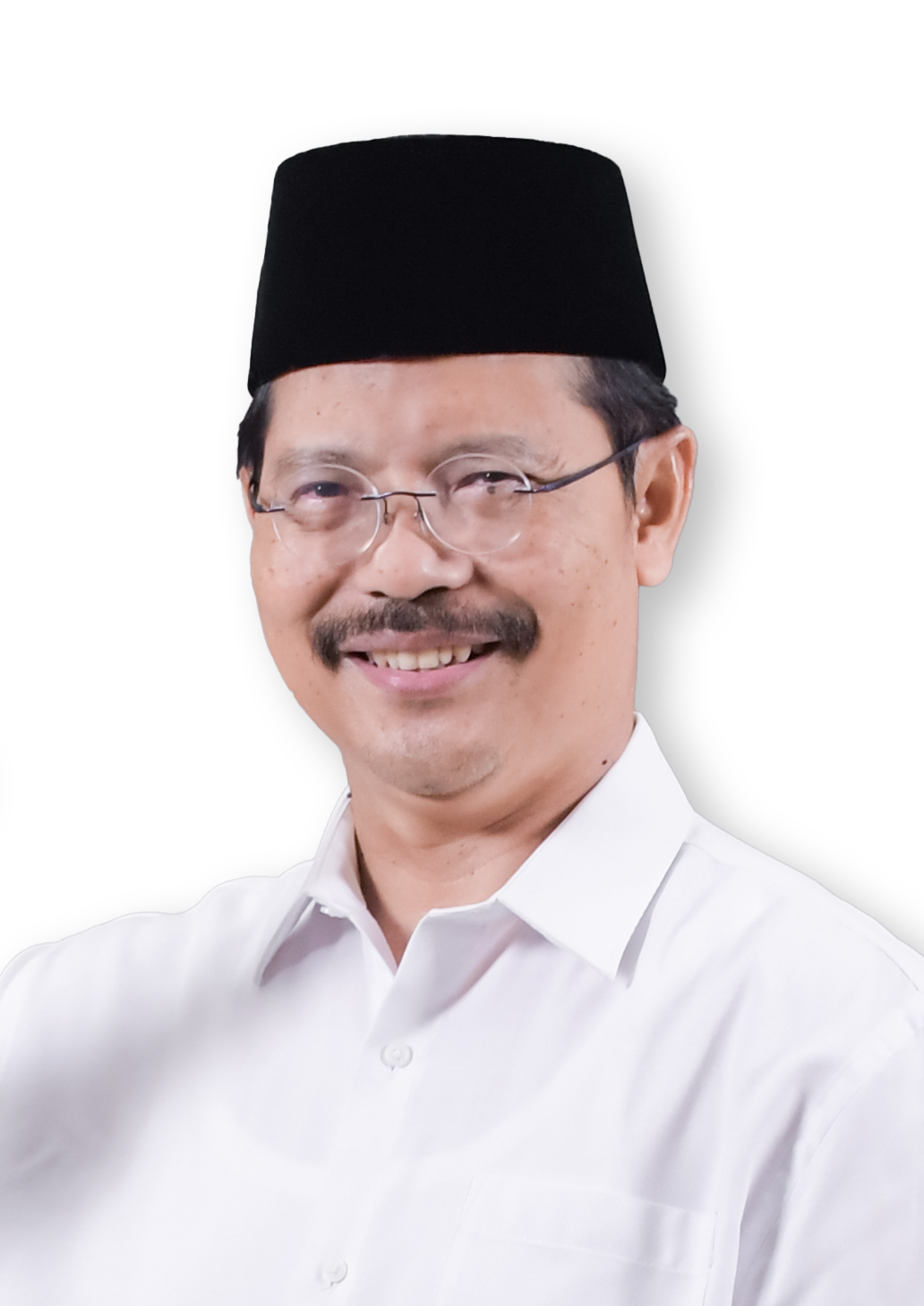
Candidate	Sachrudin	Faldo Maldini	Ahmad Amarullah
Party	Golkar	PSI	PKS
Running mate	Maryono Hasan	Mohammad Fadhlin Akbar	Bonnie Mufidjar
Popular vote	394,137	250,849	113,792
Percentage	51.94%	33.06%	15.00%
- Results by district and subdistrict (Interactive version)
Mayor before election
Nurdin (acting)
Independent
Elected mayor
Sachrudin
Golkar

The 2024 Tangerang mayoral election was held on 27 November 2024 as part of nationwide local elections to elect the mayor and vice mayor of Tangerang for a five-year term. The previous election was held in 2018. Former Vice Mayor Sachrudin of Golkar won the election with 51% of the vote. Faldo Maldini of the Indonesian Solidarity Party (PSI) placed second with 33%, followed by Ahmad Amarullah of the Prosperous Justice Party (PKS), who received 15%.

== Electoral system ==
The election, like other local elections in 2024, follow the first-past-the-post system where the candidate with the most votes wins the election, even if they do not win a majority. It is possible for a candidate to run uncontested, in which case the candidate is still required to win a majority of votes "against" an "empty box" option. Should the candidate fail to do so, the election will be repeated on a later date.

== Candidates ==
According to electoral regulations, in order to qualify for the election, candidates were required to secure support from a political party or a coalition of parties controlling 10 seats in the Tangerang City Regional House of Representatives (DPRD). As no parties won 10 or more seats in the 2024 election, coalitions are required to nominate a mayoral candidate. Candidates may alternatively demonstrate support in form of photocopies of identity cards, which in Tangerang's case corresponds to 88,541 copies. Within the deadline set by the General Elections Commission, no such candidates registered.

The previously elected mayor, Arief Rachadiono Wismansyah, had served two full terms and was therefore ineligible to run for re-election.

=== Declared ===
Candidate from PSI and NasDem
Faldo Maldini	Fadlin Akbar
for Mayor	for Vice Mayor
Parties
17 / 50 (34%) Gerindra (6 seats); NasDem (5 seats); PSI (4 seats); PAN (2 seats)

=== Potential ===
The following are individuals who have either been publicly mentioned as a potential candidate by a political party in the DPRD, publicly declared their candidacy with press coverage, or considered as a potential candidate by media outlets:

- Sachrudin (Golkar), former two-term vice mayor and chairman of Golkar's Tangerang branch.
- Hilmi Fuad (PKS), member of the Banten Regional House of Representatives.
- Jamaluddin, head of the Tangerang educational department.
- Erlangga Yudha (Golkar), head of the youth wing of Golkar's Banten branch, son of the mayor of South Tangerang Benyamin Davnie.

== Political map ==
Following the 2024 Indonesian legislative election, ten political parties are represented in the Tangerang City DPRD:

Political parties	Seat count
Party of Functional Groups (Golkar)	9 / 50
Indonesian Democratic Party of Struggle (PDI-P)	7 / 50
Great Indonesia Movement Party (Gerindra)	6 / 50
Prosperous Justice Party (PKS)	6 / 50
NasDem Party	5 / 50
National Awakening Party (PKB)	5 / 50
Democratic Party (Demokrat)	4 / 50
Indonesian Solidarity Party (PSI)	4 / 50
National Mandate Party (PAN)	2 / 50
United Development Party (PPP)	2 / 50

== Results ==
Candidate	Running mate	Party	Votes	%
Sachrudin	Maryono Hasan	Golkar	394,137	51.94
Faldo Maldini	Mohammad Fadhlin Akbar	Indonesian Solidarity Party	250,849	33.06
Ahmad Amarullah	Bonnie Mufidzar	Prosperous Justice Party	113,792	15.00
Total			758,778	100.00
Valid votes			758,778	94.57
Invalid/blank votes			43,547	5.43
Total votes			802,325	100.00
Registered voters/turnout			1,377,828	58.23
Source: KPU

Candidate vote share by district and subdistrict
Faldo–Fadhlin

Amarullah–Bonnie

Sachrudin–Maryono
