= Anwar Adnan Saleh =

Indonesian politician

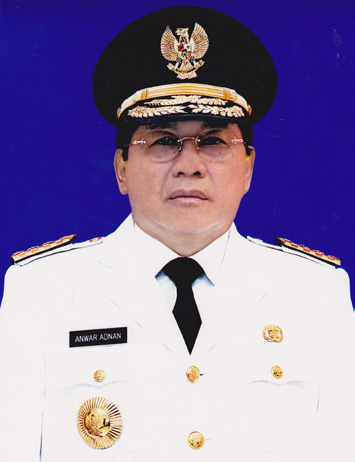

Governor of West Sulawesi
- In office 14 December 2006 – 14 December 2016
- President: Susilo Bambang Yudhoyono

Personal details
- Born: 20 August 1948 (age 77) Polewali Mamasa Regency, South Sulawesi, State of East Indonesia
- Citizenship: Indonesian
- Party: Golkar

Anwar Adnan Saleh (born 1948) is a former Governor of West Sulawesi, Indonesia. He was inaugurated in 2006.
