= Arief Rachadiono Wismansyah =

Indonesian politician

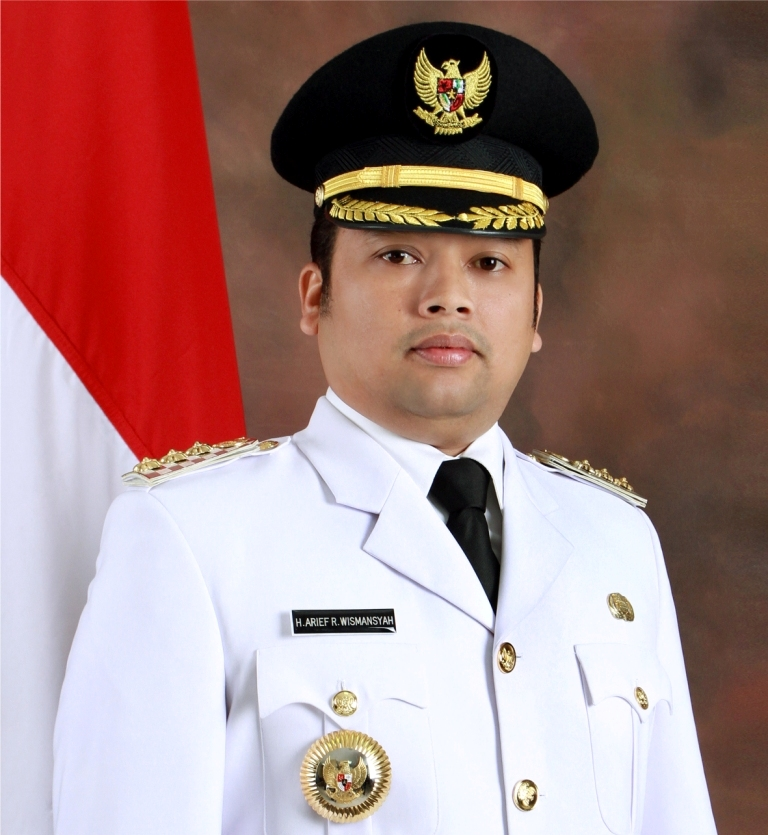

4th Mayor of Tangerang
- In office 24 December 2013 – 26 December 2023
- President: Susilo Bambang Yudhoyono; Joko Widodo
- Governor: Ratu Atut Chosiyah; Rano Karno; Wahidin Halim; Al Muktabar (acting)
- Deputy: Sachrudin
- Preceded by: Wahidin Halim
- Succeeded by: Nurdin (acting)

Deputy Mayor of Tangerang
- In office 16 November 2008 – 24 December 2013
- President: Susilo Bambang Yudhoyono
- Governor: Ratu Atut Chosiyah
- Preceded by: Deddy Syafei
- Succeeded by: Sachrudin

Personal details
- Born: April 23, 1977 (age 49) Tangerang, Banten
- Party: Democratic Party
- Spouse: Aini Suci
- Children: 4
- Education: Western Michigan University (BSc); Gadjah Mada University (M.Kes.); Hasanuddin University (Ir.), (PhD)

Arief Rachadiono Wismansyah (born 23 April 1977) was the mayor of Tangerang between 2013 and 2023. Supported by the Democratic Party, he is also the owner of a hospital network.

== Personal life ==
Wismansyah was born in Karawaci, a district of Tangerang, in 23 April 1977. He was the third son of Marsudi Haryoputro and Siti Rochayah, who were doctors operating their own clinic. His parents originated from the same village in Kebumen, Central Java.

He graduated from SMA Negeri 8 Jakarta, before resuming his higher education in Western Michigan University where he earned his bachelor's in engineering management on 2000. Later, he completed his master's course in Gadjah Mada University, obtaining a degree in healthcare administration in 2006.

== Career ==
After returning from the United States, he joined his parents' business and later became the CEO of the hospital group. In 2008, he ran as deputy mayor under Wahidin Halim, and the couple won 576,894 votes (88.22%) placing them in the 2008-2013 tenure. Later, in May 2013, Halim resigned in order to run in the 2014 legislative elections, which resulted in Wismansyah becoming the acting mayor.

=== As mayor ===
In the 2013 elections, he ran with Sachrudin as his deputy, after initially failing to pass KPU's verification process due to administrative reasons. Partly due to this, the local elections committee was later dismissed from its role in the city elections with the provincial committee taking over. The pair proceeded to win 340,810 votes (49.05%), placing them ahead of the three other tickets. The result was challenged in the Constitutional Court, but the result was upheld and Arief-Sachrudin was officially appointed as mayors following a short delay caused by the incarceration of Banten governor Ratu Atut.

His programs throughout his tenure included the expansion of the city's waste banks and establishment of a BRT system, named Trans Tangerang. He ran once more in the 2018 elections as the only running candidate, being backed by all parties in the city council.
