= Rano Karno =

Indonesian actor and politician

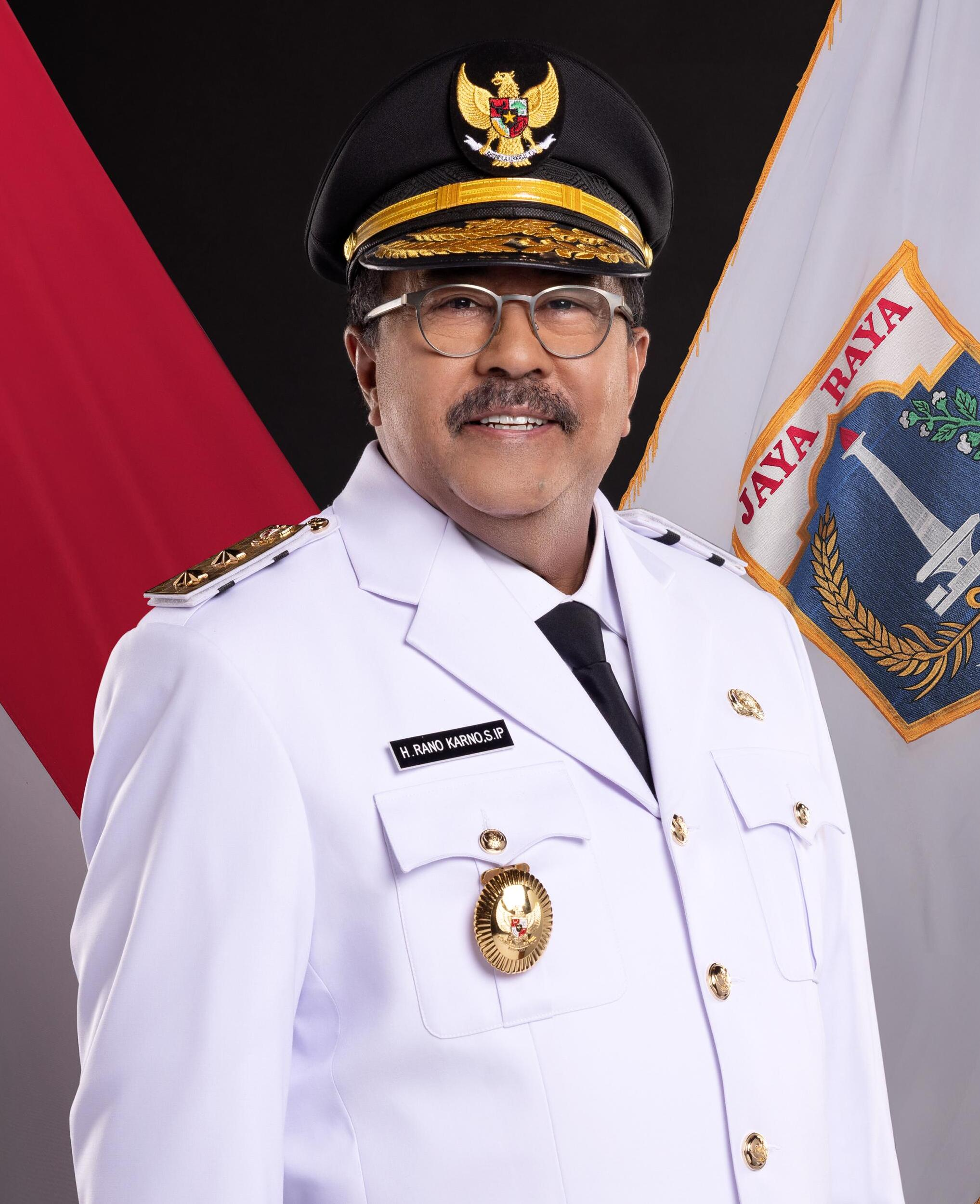
- Official portrait, 2025

Vice Governor of Jakarta
- Incumbent
- Assumed office 20 February 2025
- Governor: Pramono Anung
- Preceded by: Ahmad Riza Patria

Governor of Banten
- In office 12 August 2015 – 11 January 2017; Acting: 13 March 2014 – 12 August 2015
- Preceded by: Ratu Atut Chosiyah
- Succeeded by: Wahidin Halim

Vice Governor of Banten
- In office 11 January 2012 – 13 March 2014
- Governor: Ratu Atut Chosiyah
- Preceded by: Mohammad Masduki
- Succeeded by: Andika Hazrumy (2017)

Vice Regent of Tangerang
- In office 22 March 2008 – 19 December 2011
- Regent: Ismet Iskandar
- Preceded by: Norodom Sukarno
- Succeeded by: Hermansyah

Member of the House of Representatives
- In office 1 October 2019 – 30 September 2024
- Preceded by: Multi-member district
- Succeeded by: Yulius Setiarto
- Constituency: Banten III

Member of the People's Consultative Assembly
- In office 1 October 1997 – 30 September 1999

Personal details
- Born: 8 October 1960 (age 66) Jakarta, Indonesia
- Party: PDIP (since 1999)
- Other political affiliations: Golkar (1997–1999)
- Spouse: Dewi Indriati (m. 1988)
- Children: 2
- Occupation: Actor, politician, film director
- Notable works: Si Doel Anak Betawi; Gita Cinta dari SMA

Rano Karno (born 8 October 1960) is an Indonesian actor and politician who has served as the vice governor of Jakarta since 20 February 2025. Previously, he served as governor of Banten from 2014 to 2017 and its vice governor from 2012 to 2014, the first governor or vice governor to be elected in two different provinces. As a result of his fame gained from his acting career, he is known for starring in the 1979 film Gita Cinta dari SMA and his role as Si Doel in various media starting from the 1972 film Si Doel Anak Betawi.

== Early life ==
Karno was born on 8 October 1960 as the son of actor Sukarno M. Noor, who was of Minangkabau descent with ancestral roots in Bonjol, Pasaman, West Sumatra (although he was born and brought up in the capital to parents from the said village) and his ethnic local-born Betawi wife, Lily Istiarti Sukarno, and grew up in Kemayoran, Central Jakarta. Due to his father's low earnings, he was raised in poverty; he later quipped that his family had had one plate to feed five people, like a popular dangdut song. Although the family's finances would not have been enough to see him through his schooling, he was able to finish his schooling after the fees were reduced by half. As an escape from his family's poverty, Karno would go to a Balai Pustaka-run library and read classic works of Indonesian literature, including novels such as Abdul Muis' Salah Asuhan and the traditional folktale Malin Kundang.

== Entertainment career ==
Karno's habit of reading later helped him to land his first acting job. At the age of ten, he attended an audition for a film production of Malin Kundang and, displeased with the changes to the story, blurted out "That's not how the story goes." The director, impressed with Karno's knowledge of the story, cast him. At first, his father did not support his choice as the elder Noer was worried that Karno would continue to be poor.

After Malin Kundang, in 1972 Karno starred in the film adaptation of Si Doel Anak Betawi (Doel, the Betawi Child). After the film's success, Karno starred in several other films, including Rio Anakku (Rio, My Child; 1974) and Di Mana Kau Ibu? (Where Are You Mother?; 1974). In 1979, he starred as Galih in Arizal's film Gita Cinta dari SMA (Love Song from High School); for a period after the film, he was rumoured to be dating his costar, Yessi Gusman.

In 1990, Karno switched to directing; his serial adaptation of Si Doel Anak Betawi (titled Si Doel Anak Sekolahan), although initially refused by studios for being too "provincial", was highly successful and ran for six seasons.

His first book, The Last Barongsai, was published in 2010; that same year, he released another film, Satu Jam Saja (Just One Hour).

As of September 2011, Karno was planning to make a film adaptation of The Last Barongsai.

== Political career ==
From 1997 to 2002, Karno served as a member of the People's Consultative Assembly, and from 2002 to 2007, he served as UNICEF Goodwill Ambassador, promoting literacy.

In 2008, Karno ran for deputy regent (wakil bupati) of Tangerang as the partner of incumbent regent (bupati) Ismet Iskandar. The pair won the election and were expected to serve until 2013. While serving as deputy regent Karno continued to be active in the world of entertainment.

In early 2011, Karno began campaigning for governor of Jakarta against incumbent Fauzi Bowo on the Indonesian Democratic Party – Struggle ticket. Despite showing an early lead, in early July Karno cancelled his candidacy for governor of Jakarta to run as Deputy Governor of Banten as the running mate of incumbent Bantan governor Ratu Atut Chosiyah. On 30 October the Banten General Elections Commission announced that Chosiyah-Karno had won the election, with 50% percent of the votes; in mid-December 2011 he resigned as Deputy Regent of Tangerang. He was to be sworn in on 11 January 2012 and was expected to serve until 2017.

After Ratu Atut was arrested for a graft case, Karno took over her position and became governor in 2015. He tried to run for a second term in the 2017 gubernatorial election, but was defeated by Wahidin Halim.

=== 2024 Jakarta gubernatorial election ===
In 2024, Karno ran as a candidate for Deputy governor of Jakarta to accompany Pramono Anung who is the Cabinet Secretary in the 2024 Jakarta gubernatorial election and registered with the Jakarta General Election Commission on 28 August 2024.

== Accolades ==
At the 1974 Indonesian Film Festival, Karno won a Citra Award for Best Child Actor for his work in the film Rio Anakku; that same year, he won Best Child Actor at the Asia Pacific Film Festival for Di Mana Kau Ibu?. Six years later, he won another Citra Award for his role in Taksi. In 1995, he won Best Actor and Best Director for the serial Si Doel Anak Sekolahan.

== Personal life ==
Karno is married to Dewi Indriati, with whom he has a daughter and a son. As of July 2011, he was valued at Rp 13 billion (US$1.5 million).

== Selected filmography ==
As of 2008, Karno has acted in more than 70 films.

- Malin Kundang (1971)
- Lingkaran Setan (Satan's Circle; 1972)
- Si Doel Anak Betawi (Doel, the Betawi Child; 1972)
- Tabah Sampai Akhir (Patient to the End; 1973)
- Yatim (Orphan; 1973)
- Si Rano (Rano; 1973)
- Rio Anakku (Rio, My Child; 1974)
- Di Mana Kau Ibu (Where are You Mother? 1974)
- Romi dan Juli (Romi and Juli; 1974)
- Jangan Biarkan Mereka Lapar (Don't Let Them Go Hungry; 1974)
- Perawan Malam (Virgin of the Night; 1974)
- Anak Bintang (Star Child; 1974)
- Ratapan Si Miskin (The Poor Man's Tears; 1974)
- Senyum Dipagi Bulan September (Smile on a September Morning; 1974)
- Senyum dan Tangis (Smiles and Tear; 1974).
- Sebelum Usia 17 (Before Age 17; 1975)
- Tragedi Tante Sexy (Tragedy of the Sexy Aunt; 1976)
- Wajah Tiga Perempuan (Three Women's Faces; 1976)
- Semau Gue (As I Want; 1977)
- Suci Sang Primadona (The Primadonna's Holiness; 1977)
- Musim Bercinta (Season for Loving; 1978)
- Pelajaran Cinta (Lesson's in Love; 1979)
- Anak-Anak Buangan (Abandoned Children; 1979)
- Buah Terlarang (Forbidden Fruit; 1979);
- Gita Cinta dari SMA (Love Song from High School; 1979)
- Remaja di Lampu Merah (Teens Under the Red Light; 1979)
- Remaja-Remaja (Teenagers; 1979)
- Nikmatnya Cinta (The Joys of Love; 1980)
- Roman Picisan (1980)
- Selamat Tinggal Masa Remaja (Goodbye Teenage Years; 1980)
- Selamat Tinggal Duka (Goodbye Grief; 1980)
- Kembang Semusim (A Season's Flowers; 1980)
- Nostalgia di SMA (Nostalgia at High School; 1980)
- Tempatmu di Sisiku (Your Place is By My Side; 1980)
- Yang Kembali Bersemi (That Which Blooms Again; 1980)
- Kisah Cinta Tommi dan Jerri (Tommi and Jerri's Love Story; 1980)
- Kau Tercipta Untukku (You Were Made For Me; 1980)
- Aladin dan Lampu Wasiat (Aladdin and the Magic Lamp; 1980)
- Senyummu Adalah Tangisku (Your Smile is My Tears; 1980)
- Puspa Indah Taman Hati (Beautiful Flower in the Heart's Garden; 1981)
- Bunga Cinta Kasih (Flower of Love; 1981)
- Mawar Cinta Berduri Duka (Love Rose has Grief's Thorns; 1981)
- Detik-Detik Cinta Menyentuh (The Seconds when Love Touches; 1981)
- Dalam Lingkaran Cinta (In Love's Circles; 1981)
- Yang (1984)
- Asmara di Balik Pintu (Love Behind the Door; 1984)
- Untukmu Kuserahkan Segalanya (I Give Up Everything for You; 1984)
- Ranjau-Ranjau Cinta (Love's Landmines; 1985)
- Tak Ingin Sendiri (Don't Want to be Alone; 1985)
- Kidung Cinta (Love's Melody; 1985)
- Yang Masih di Bawah Umur (Those Still Underage; 1985)
- Pertunangan (Engagement; 1985)
- Anak-Anak Malam (Night's Children; 1986)
- Merangkul Langit (Hugging the Sky; 1986)
- Di Dadaku Ada Cinta (In My Chest There is Love; 1986)
- Opera Jakarta (1986)
- Blauw Bloed (1986)
- Bilur-Bilur (Wounds; 1986)
- Penyesalan (Regret; 1987)
- Arini, Masih Ada Kereta Yang Lewat (Arini, There are Still Trains Passing; 1987)
- Macan Kampus (Tiger on Campus; 1987)
- Dia Bukan Bayiku (It's Not My Baby; 1988)
- Arini II (1988)

== Awards and nominations ==
Year	Award	Category	Recipients	Result
Indonesian Film Festival	1984	Citra Award for Best Leading Actor	Yang	Nominated
Indonesian Film Festival	1985	Citra Award for Best Leading Actor	Ranjau-ranjau Cinta	Nominated
Indonesian Film Festival	1987	Citra Award for Best Leading Actor	Arini (Masih Ada Kereta yang Akan Lewat)	Nominated
Indonesian Film Festival	1989	Citra Award for Best Leading Actor	Arini II (Biarkan Kereta Api itu Lewat)	Nominated
Indonesian Film Festival	1990	Citra Award for Best Leading Actor	Taksi	Won
Indonesian Film Festival	1992	Citra Award for Best Leading Actor	Kuberikan Segalanya	Nominated

== Honours ==
- Lencana Melati (2016)
- Lencana Darma Bakti
- Satyalancana Pembangunan
- Satyalancana Wira Karya
