= Ahmed Zaki Iskandar =

Indonesian politician

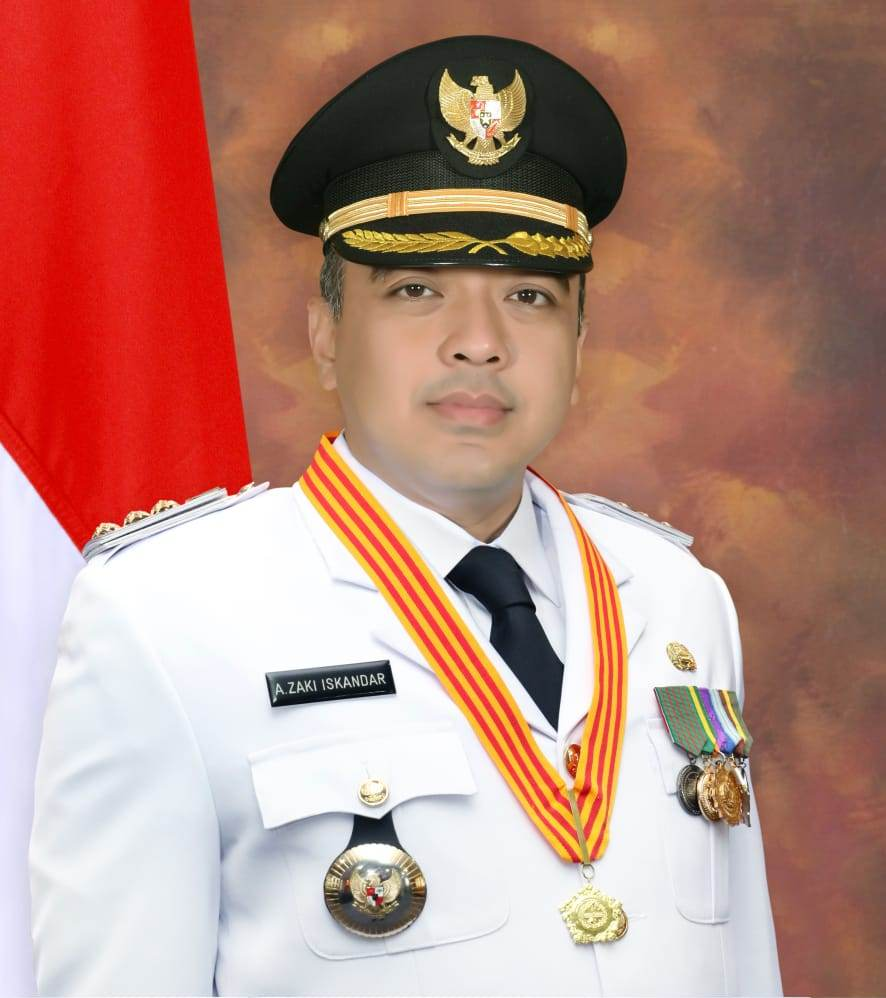

Regent of Tangerang
- In office 22 March 2013 – 21 September 2023
- Preceded by: Ismet Iskandar
- Succeeded by: Andi Ony Prihartono (Anting)

Member of House of Representatives
- In office 1 October 2009 – 2013

Personal details
- Born: 14 December 1973 (age 52) Tangerang, West Java, Indonesia
- Party: Golkar

Ahmed Zaki Iskandar (born 14 December 1973) is an Indonesian politician who served as regent of Tangerang Regency between 2013 and 2023. He was formerly a member of the House of Representatives.

== Early life and education ==
Iskandar was born in Tangerang, then part of West Java province, on 14 December 1973. He completed his elementary, middle and high school in Tangerang, obtaining a diploma from Victoria University in 1998 and later a bachelor's degree in economics from Pramita Indonesia University in Tangerang and a master's degree in governance studies from the Institute of Home Government in 2017.

== Career ==
He joined Golkar in 1992, during the New Order period, although did not participate actively in politics until 1998. In the 2009 legislative election, he was elected into the House of Representatives (DPR) representing Banten's 3rd electoral district (Tangerang).

Iskandar was elected in the 2013 regency election and then sworn in as regent on 22 March 2013, replacing his father Ismet Iskandar. He was reelected in the 2018 regency election, as he ran as a single candidate. The regency government under Iskandar increased enforcement of building permits, and enforced restrictions for heavy cargo traffic on highways and roads in Tangerang.

Iskandar's government also developed a residential, entertainment and mosque complex in the Dadap neighborhood in the north of the regency, which involved relocating nearly 400 households. The densely populated neighborhood was notorious for social issues such as drug abuse and prostitution. The relocation process in May 2016, however, resulted in significant protests from the inhabitants, who filed a report to the National Commission on Human Rights citing the use of violence and tear gas inflicting some injuries on residents. Iskandar claimed that the residents were to be relocated within the same administrative district less than a kilometer away, and that they had been informed of the relocation plans since March 2016.

In 2020, Iskandar was elected as chairman of Golkar's Jakarta branch for a five-year term, being the sole candidate for the position. The branch has voiced their intent to endorse Iskandar as a candidate for Jakarta's 2022 gubernatorial election, challenging incumbent Anies Baswedan. His tenure as regent ended on 21 September 2023.

He ran for a seat in DPR in 2024, representing Jakarta's 3rd electoral district, but was not elected.
