= Wahidin Halim =

Indonesian politician

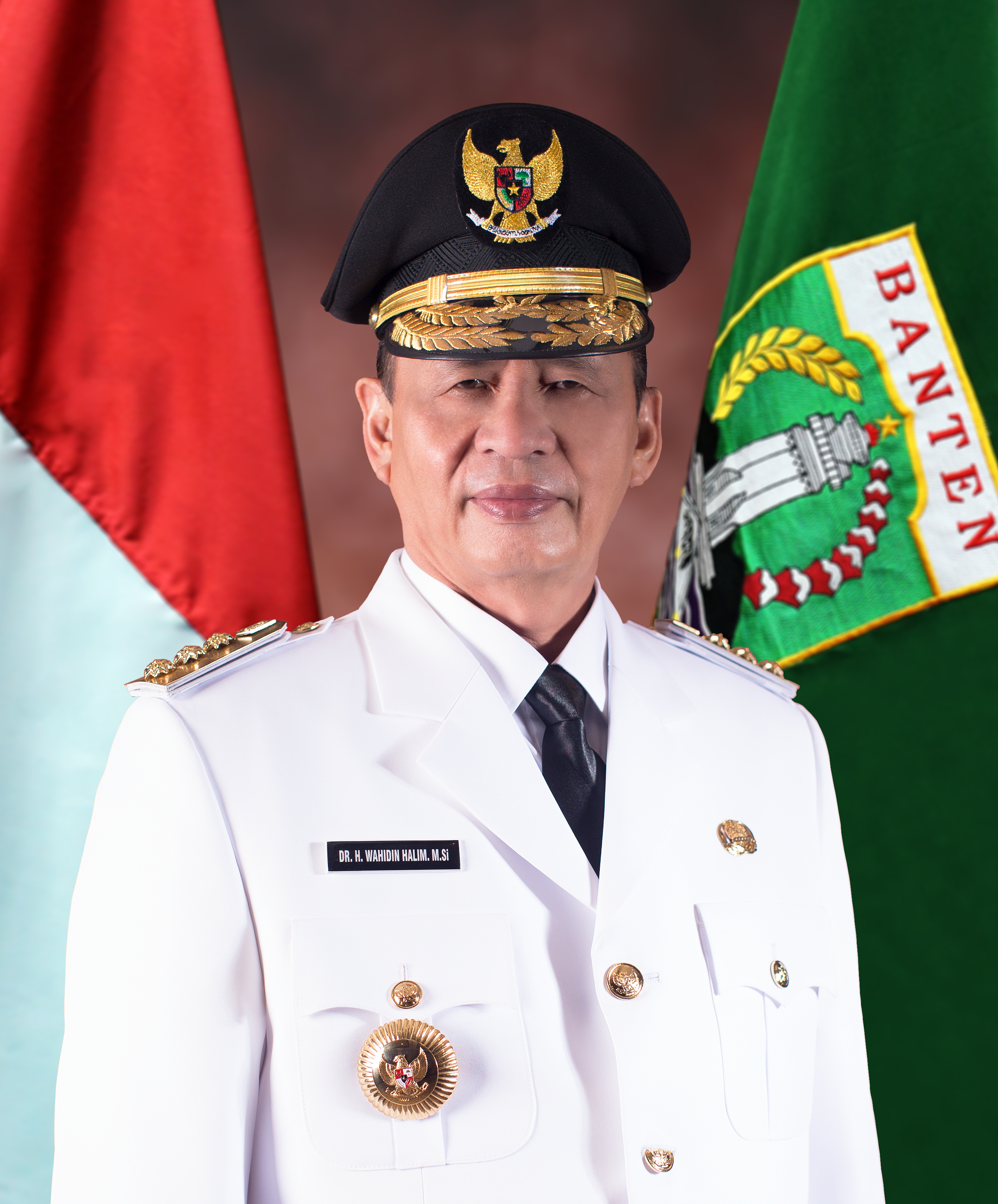
- Official portrait, 2017

Governor of Banten
- In office 12 May 2017 – 12 May 2022
- Deputy: Andika Hazrumy
- Preceded by: Rano Karno
- Succeeded by: Al Muktabar (acting)

Mayor of Tangerang
- In office 16 November 2003 – 12 September 2013
- Preceded by: Mochammad Thamrin
- Succeeded by: Arief Rachadiono

Faction represented in People's Representative Council
- 2014–2016: Democratic Party

Personal details
- Born: 14 August 1954 (age 71) Tangerang, West Java, Indonesia
- Party: NasDem Party (since 2022); Democratic Party (2004–2022); Golkar Party (until 2004)
- Spouse: Niniek Nuraini (m. 1981)
- Website: wahidinhalim.id

Wahidin Halim (born 14 August 1954) is an Indonesian politician who is the formerly Governor of Banten, having held that position since 2017 to 2022. Before being elected to the office, Halim had spent two years as a legislator and ten years as the mayor of Tangerang.

Halim was born in Tangerang and completed his higher education in the University of Indonesia. His career started out as a local bureaucrat, before eventually becoming Tangerang's city secretary prior to his election as mayor in 2003.

== Background ==
Wahidin Halim was born in Pinang, Tangerang, West Java (now Banten), on 14 August 1954. The third child of nine, his father was an elementary school teacher. After completing his high school in Tangerang, he earned a bachelor's degree from the University of Indonesia on 1978. He later gained a masters from Satyagama University and a doctorate from Padjadjaran University.

He is married to Niniek Nur'aini and has three children.

== Career ==
Early in his career, while he was still in his 20s, he was elected as a village chief. Around 1980, following a local government reform, village chiefs officially became state employees and Wahidin entered bureaucracy, becoming the "lurah" (administrative village chief) of his home village. He became head of the city's taxation office by 1988, and head of the development office in 1991, before moving to the Tangerang Regency government where he worked for five years as subdistrict head and department chief. He returned to Tangerang as city secretary in 2003.

=== Mayor of Tangerang ===
In 2003, Halim was voted as the mayor of Tangerang by the city council, winning over two other candidates by a significant margin. In 2005, during his first term, the city's government released a law prohibiting prostitution. He was approached by the Prosperous Justice Party to run as governor of Banten in the 2007 gubernatorial election, but eventually declined. He ran for reelection in 2008, during Tangerang's first direct mayoral election. Running with Arief Rachadiono Wismansyah in the three-candidate race, Halim won over 80 percent of the votes to secure a second term for himself.

During his tenure as mayor, he established a "green village" program, planting trees in order to mitigate pollution generated by factories. He also criticized then-governor Ratu Atut Chosiyah, saying that the provincial government did not understand the issues encountered by people living close to Jakarta.

Halim ran as a gubernatorial candidate in 2011, towards the expiry of his second term, but lost to Ratu Atut. In 2013, Halim was removed from his post as the head of Demokrat in Banten, which he held since October 2011, as he opposed the party's candidate for the Mayor of Tangerang succeeding him. Instead, Halim supported his younger brother and Golkar nominee Abdul Syukur, although Demokrat's candidate Arief Rachadiono Wismansyah eventually won.

An academician from Syarif Hidayatullah State Islamic University Jakarta remarked that under Halim's tenure, various metrics such as investments, local government revenues and spending and the human development index all improved, but the poverty rate increased.

=== Legislator ===
Following the expiry of his second term, Halim ran under Demokrat as a legislative candidate in the 2014 election to the People's Representative Council, representing Tangerang. He was successful and gained the most votes in the electoral district, with 84,025 votes - exceeding the total votes for the rest of his party.

=== Governor of Banten ===
In 2017. Halim ran in Banten's gubernatorial election against incumbent Rano Karno, resigning from his DPR post to do so. Running with Andika Hazrumy, the pair won with 50.95 percent of the votes. A lawsuit to the Constitutional Court was overthrown, and the pair was sworn in on 12 May 2017.

Rumors circulated in 2018 that Halim was to join Joko Widodo's campaign team for the 2019 presidential election, and was included in its advisers list, but Demokrat (which endorsed Prabowo Subianto) denied his inclusion.

== Honours ==
- Satyalancana Karya Satya (20 Years) - 2007
- Satyalancana Pembangunan - 2007
- Satyalancana Pendidikan - 2007
- Satyalancana Karya Bhakti Praja Nugraha - 2013
- Lencana Melati Gerakan Pramuka - 2008
- Lencana Darma Bakti Gerakan Pramuka - 2006
