= Ratu Atut Chosiyah =

Indonesian politician (born 1962)

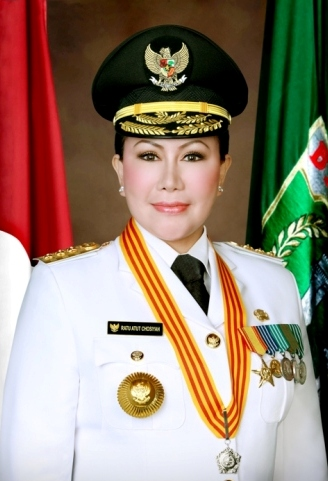

3rd Governor of Banten
- In office 11 January 2007 – 9 May 2014
- President: Susilo Bambang Yudhoyono
- Deputy: Mohammad Masduki; First period Rano Karno Second period
- Preceded by: Herself (acting)
- Succeeded by: Rano Karno (acting)

Governor of Banten Acting
- In office 20 October 2005 – 10 January 2007
- President: Susilo Bambang Yudhoyono
- Preceded by: Djoko Munandar
- Succeeded by: Herself (acting)

1st Deputy Governor of Banten
- In office 11 January 2002 – 11 October 2005
- President: Susilo Bambang Yudhoyono
- Governor: Djoko Munandar
- Preceded by: Established
- Succeeded by: Mohammad Masduki

Personal details
- Born: 16 May 1962 (age 64) Ciomas, Serang, West Java (now Banten), Indonesia
- Party: Golongan Karya
- Spouse: Hikmat Tomet
- Children: Andika Hazrumy; Andiara Aprilia Hikmat; Ananda Triana Salichan

Ratu Atut Chosiyah (born 16 May 1962) is a former governor of Banten, Indonesia. She was suspended from office in 2014 because of a corruption case. She held office for several terms. Before her election as governor in 2006, she was the deputy governor under Djoko Munandar starting from 11 January 2002. Djoko was involved in a corruption case and was suspended from office in October 2005. President Susilo Bambang Yudhoyono appointed Ratu Atut as the acting governor to take over Djoko's administrative duties and she later became governor. She thus became the first female governor in Indonesia. In May 2014, she was formally charged by the Indonesian Corruption Eradication Commission for alleged corruption. In early September 2014, she was sentenced to a four-year term of imprisonment on the charges brought by the Commission against her. In September 2022, Ratu Atut was released on parole.

== Political career ==
=== Deputy Governor ===
Atut firstly took office as deputy governor under governor Djoko Munandar in 2002 making her the first woman deputy governor in Indonesia. In 2005 Djoko Munandar was removed from office for corruption. Atut was sworn in as acting governor in 2006 until Djoko's term ended in January 2007.

=== 2006 Election ===
As caretaker governor, she was responsible for the preparations for the 2006 provincial election. She decided to nominate and select Mohammad Masduki as her running mate in the deputy governor (wakil gubernur) slot. She won the election held on 26 November 2006 and became governor for the period of 2006–2011. She was sworn into office along with her deputy governor, Mohammad Masduki, by the minister of interior Muhammad Ma'ruf on 11 January 2007.

== Governorship (2007–2014) ==
=== Activities as governor ===
As governor, Ratu Atut was active in building links between political and business circles in Banten. She supported plans for large investments to expand the Jakarta Soekarno-Hatta International Airport located within Banten province by developing and integrating a planned airport in Pandeglang. She also involved the Banten government in active support for the proposed Sunda Strait Bridge mega project in 2009, which would have likely cost more than $US 6.5 billion (Rp. 100 trillion) if plans for the construction of the bridge had gone ahead.

=== 2011 Election ===
Ratu Atut stood for election again in the 2011 provincial elections with former singer Rano Karno as her running mate for deputy governor. She was supported by two of the largest political parties in Indonesia, Golkar and the PDI-P (Partai Demokrat Indonesia-Perjuangan), and won the election comfortably with 49.6% of the vote. Initially, the vote was challenged by the losing candidates. However, in November 2011 the Constitutional Court rejected the challenges clearing the way for Ratu Atut to become governor of Banten for a second time. She was sworn into office for a five-year term 2012–2017 by minister of the interior Gamawan Fauzi on 11 January 2012.

=== Corruption allegations ===
2013

On 3 October 2013 Ratu Atut was forbidden from travelling overseas by the Indonesian Immigration authorities on account of a number of corruption investigations in which her family was suspected of involvement. The imposition of the travel ban, and the reports that her brother Tubagus Chaeri Wardana (often known as "Wawan") was involved in a case of bribery involving the Chief Justice of the Constitutional Court, encouraged some Banten residents to stage a protest outside the Indonesian Corruption Eradication Commission (Komisi Pemberantasan Korupsi or KPK) about her activities as governor of the province. On Friday 11 October 2013 Ratu Atut, in response to an official summons, attended a session at the KPK to answer questions about the bribery case involving her brother.

Issues of possible corruption surrounding Atut's family widened significantly in late October when the KPK announced that an investigation had been launched into matters under the administration of Atut's sister-in-law, Tangerang Mayor Airin Rachmi Diani. The investigation, into alleged irregularities in the procurement of medical equipment in South Tangerang, were said to be into matters entirely unrelated to the bribery investigation concerning Airin's husband, Tubagus Chaeri "Wawan" Wardana.

The row over issues of possible corruption in Atut's family continued to attract close media attention during November 2013. On 17 December the KPK took the significant step of formally naming Atut as a suspect in connection with her alleged role in the suspected bribery of the chief justice of the Constitutional Court. On 20 December, in the midst of considerable publicity, she attended a formal session at the KPK to answer questions relating to her alleged involvement in corruption. According to press reports, around 1,000 police were mobilised to ensure order in the streets near the KPK and around 40 busloads of her supporters gathered to protest the investigation into her activities. Later in the day, the KPK formally arrested Atut and placed her under detention. Media reports quickly highlighted the sharp change in her personal fortunes, noting the contrast between her lifestyle as governor of Banten when she had lived in relatively lavish surroundings and conditions in the detention centre where she had been placed in Jakarta.

2014

In early January 2014, the KPK widened investigations into Atut's family dealings in Banten. The KPK decided to charge Ratu Atut with extortion in connection with charges that she attempted to bribe former chief justice of the Constitutional Court, Akil Mochtar, and it was announced that her brother, Tubagus Chaeri "Wawan" Wardana, would be charged with money laundering over his alleged involvement in a medical procurement program in Banten. She was subsequently formally detained by the KPK. Anti-corruption groups subsequently demanded that Atut be given a severe sentence.

In early September 2014 the Jakarta Corruption Court sentenced Ratu Atut to a four-year prison term. Prosecutors had asked for a 10-year term. The Deputy Chair of the KPK, Busryo Muqoddas, commented that the sentence of four years was a light one given the damage caused by Ratu Atut's actions. He said that the KPK would appeal to seek a heavier sentence. Anti-corruption organisations, such as Indonesia Corruption Watch, were also critical of the judgement.

2015

In February 2015 the Indonesian Supreme Court turned down an appeal by Ratu Atut against her sentence and increased the term of her imprisonment to seven years. At the same time the court determined that a lawyer who acted for Ratu Atut in bribery transactions would also be imprisoned for seven years. Several months later, in June, it was announced that the Supreme Court had stripped Ratu Atut of her right to run for public office following her conviction for corruption.

2017

In July 2017, Ratu Atut was sentenced to an additional 5 years in prison alongside $16 thousand (Rp. 250 million) in fines or an additional 6 months behind bars for her role in a graft case surrounding a 2012 project to obtain medical equipment in Banten. She was found guilty of misusing the provincial health agency's funds, leading to $6 million in provincial losses, as well as for extorting $35 thousand (Rp. 500 million) from her subordinates for investigation fees. She did not appeal her sentence.

2022

In September 2022, Ratu Atut was released on parole from Class IIA Tangerang Penitentiary after having received a 3 month commutation of her sentence on the 77th anniversary of the Indonesian Independence Day, thereby meeting the substantive and administrative conditions for parole. She will remain on probation until her actual release date of July 8, 2025.

=== Corruption in Banten ===
Allegations about corruption within the Banten administration are made more sensitive by the fact that there are well-known historical overtones to the issue of corruption in the area. Severe local poverty has long been a marked feature of some parts of the Banten region. Areas near the provincial capital, Serang, and south of Serang in Lebak and Pandeglang, are known for their high levels of poverty. Extensive poverty in the Lebak area, and the failure of government policies to address the issue, stirred up an international furore when the controversial novel Max Havelaar by Multatuli was published in The Netherlands in 1860. Much of Max Havelaar is set in the Lebak region where the protagonist, young Dutch colonial official Max Havelaar, is presented as battling against a corrupt local Dutch government system.

== Honours ==
- Lencana Melati
- Satyalancana Pendidikan
- Satyalancana Wira Karya
- Satyalancana Pembangunan
- Satyalancana Kebhaktian Sosial

== Family political links ==
Ratu Atut's family is well-connected in political and government circles in Banten. Her father, Haji Tubagus Chasan Sochib (often known as Haji Hasan) who died in mid-2011, was a widely known and somewhat controversial business entrepreneur and community leader in the Banten area.

At the time of Ratu Atut's reelection in 2011 it was reported that her husband, Hikmat Tomet, was a member of Golkar in the Indonesian People's Representative Council (Dewan Perwakilan Rakyat or DPR), her younger sister, Ratu Tatu Chasanah, was the deputy district head of Serang Regency in Banten, her step-brother, Tb Haerul Nurjaman, was deputy mayor of Serang, her son, Andika Hazrumy, was a member of the Regional Representative Council (Dewan Perwakilan Daerah or DPD) in Jakarta and Vice Governor of Banten from 2017 to 2022, and her daughter-in-law, Adde Khairunnisa, was the deputy speaker of the Serang regional council. In addition, governor Atut's step-mother, Heryani, is the deputy regent (wakil Bupati) of the Pandeglang Regency, part of Banten province. Her sister-in-law, Airin Rachmi Diany, ran for election as head of the South Tangerang regency, a position she was subsequently elected to after some controversy.

In late 2012 Ratu Atut's brother-in-law, Aden Abdul Khalik, unsuccessfully ran for the position of head (bupati) of the Tangerang Regency in Banten province. Aden was supported in his bid by a range of small political parties including the United Development Party (PPP), the Indonesian Nahdlatul Ulama Party (PNUI), the Concern for the Nation Functional Party (PKPB) and the People's Democratic Party (PDP) but not by the major Golkar party which both he and Ratu Atut belonged to at the time.

In February 2015 the KPK (Corruption Eradication Commission) confiscated 17 plots of land, said to be worth considerable sums of money, allegedly bought as part of money laundering activities by Ratu Atut's younger brother, Tubagus Chaeri "Wawan" Wardana. A KPK spokesperson said that the confiscated assets were located in various parts of Bali. The confiscations were said to be additions to the list of assets that KPK investigators had seized from "Wawan" Wardana, the husband of South Tangerang Mayor Airin Rachmi Diany.

The detention of Ratu Atut in December 2013 for alleged corruption triggered a contest for leadership within the Banten branch of Golkar. There was some discussion within Golkar ranks at the national level as to the advantages of choosing a regional leader who was not closely linked to Ratu Atut's family. In the vote to decide who would become the regional Golkar chair on 27 December 2013 however, her sister Ratu Tatu Chasanah was selected as the local Golkar leader, and the family continued to maintain a highly visible role in political life in the province.

These sorts of extensive family linkages within the political system have led to discussion in recent years in Indonesia about the dangers of 'political dynasties' forming at the local level. The current arrangements in Banten are often cited in the Indonesian and international media as an example of the evolving role of some prominent Indonesian families in politics.
