= Hella Haasse =

Dutch writer (1918–2011)

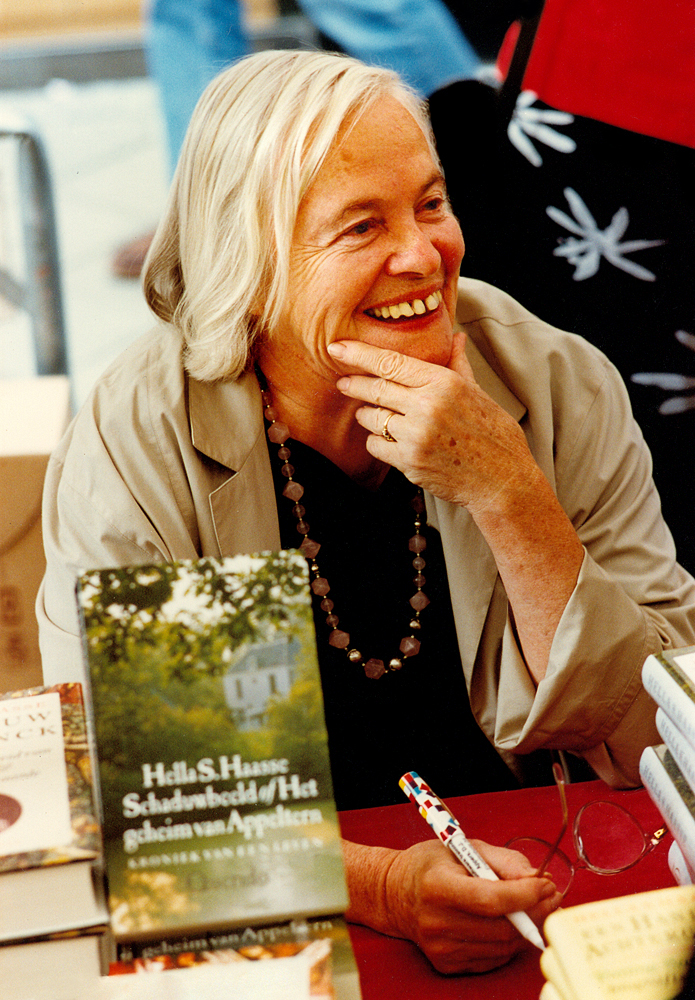
- Amsterdam, July 2006
- Born: Hélène Serafia Haasse; 2 February 1918; Batavia, Dutch East Indies
- Died: 29 September 2011 (aged 93); Amsterdam, Netherlands
- Education: University of Amsterdam
- Spouse(s): Jan van Lelyveld (1944–2008; his death); 3 children
- Writing career
- Period: 1948–2011
- Subjects: Historical novels, Dutch East Indies-Netherlands relationship
- Notable awards: 19 total (inc. 2 honorary degrees and P.C. Hooft Award)

Hélène Serafia "Hella" Haasse (2 February 1918 – 29 September 2011) was a Dutch writer, often referred to as the "Grande Dame" of Dutch literature, and whose novel Oeroeg (1948) was a staple for generations of Dutch schoolchildren. Her internationally acclaimed magnum opus is Heren van de Thee, translated to The Tea Lords. In 1988 Haasse was chosen to interview the Dutch Queen for her 50th birthday after which celebrated Dutch author Adriaan van Dis called Haasse "the Queen among authors".

Haasse has the first Dutch digital online museum dedicated to the life and work of an author. The museum was opened in 2008 on her 90th birthday.

Haasse has an asteroid named after her.

== Early life and studies ==
Hélène Serafia Haasse was born on 2 February 1918 in Batavia (now Jakarta), the capital of the Dutch East Indies (Indonesia). She was the daughter of civil servant and author Willem Hendrik Haasse (1889–1955) and concert pianist Katharina Diehm Winzenhöhler (1893–1983). She had a brother Wim who was born in 1921. The Haasse family was not very religious.

Before Haasse's first birthday, the family moved from Batavia to Buitenzorg (Bogor), because her mother's health would benefit from the milder climate. In 1920, the family moved to Rotterdam in the Netherlands, where her father got a temporary job at the city hall. In 1922, the family moved back to the Indies to Soerabaja (Surabaya). Here Haasse went to kindergarten and later to a Catholic primary school, because this was the nearest school. When her mother became ill and went to a sanatorium in Davos, Haasse was first sent to her maternal grandparents in Heemstede and then her paternal grandparents in Baarn, and she later stayed at a boarding school in Baarn. In 1928, her mother was recovered and all family members moved back to the Indies to Bandoeng (Bandung).

In 1930, the Haasse family moved again to Buitenzorg, and a year later again to Batavia. Here she went to the secondary school Bataviaas Lyceum, where Haasse became an active member of the literary club Elcee. In 1935, the family visited the Netherlands, after which Haasse became aware of differences between the Dutch and East Indian society. Haasse graduated from the Lyceum in 1938.

Haasse then moved to the Netherlands to study Dutch. She quickly abandoned this plan, and studied Scandinavian language and literature at the University of Amsterdam. In Amsterdam, she joined a student theater group and met her future husband Jan van Lelyveld, who invited her to become an editor for the satirical magazine Propria Cures in 1940.

== Dutch East Indies literature ==
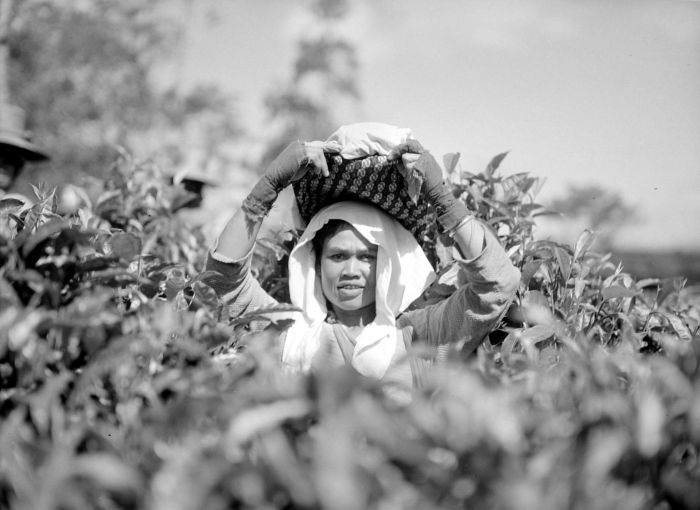
Tea plantation in the Preanger mountains, West Java, the area where Haasse's novel The Tea Lords is set and which she visited.

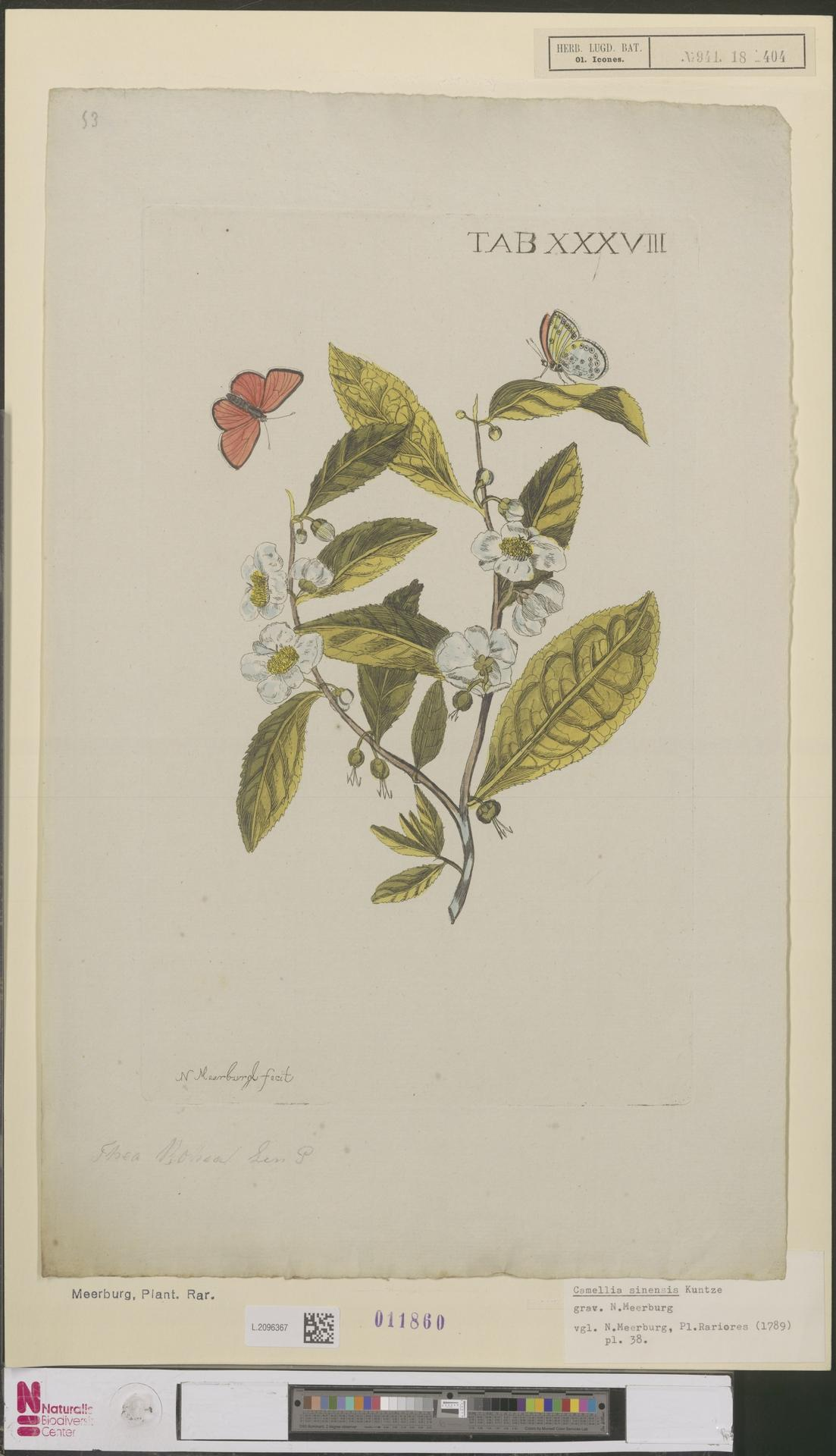
N. Meerburgh: Tea Camellia sinensis Kuntze, 1789, used a bookcover for The Tea Lords

An important segment of her literary work consists of Dutch Indies literature. Her debut Oeroeg (1948), is set in the Dutch East Indies, where Haasse was born and lived for most of the first 20 years of her life. Even more autobiographical texts and books about her life in the East Indies, includes books such as The East Indies continued to play an important part in her work: Krassen op een rots (1970) and her last novel Sleuteloog (2002), which has the same theme as Oeroeg: is a friendship between a Dutch colonial and an Indonesian child possible and can they really understand each other?

This Oeroeg was well received and often reprinted, but did experience some controversy due to the critical reception by Tjalie Robinson, an older Indo (Eurasian) author, who did not find the characters in the story credible. Moreover, as Robinson himself was still living in the Dutch East Indies at that time, hoping for and working towards fraternization between the Dutch and Indonesians his sharp criticism was directed against what he considered the defeatist nature of the book.

The movie Oeroeg based on the book premiered in 1993.

Her internationally acclaimed Heren van de Thee was translated as The Tea Lords in 2010. It is a colonial historical novel set in the Dutch East Indies of the 19th and 20th century, based on family archives of the heirs and relations of the tea plantation owners featuring in the book.

== Awards ==
Her great commercial success and critical acclaim is reflected in the numerous prizes she has been awarded over the years. She has won prizes for both her first novel in 1948 as well as her last novel in 2003. Prestigious awards for her entire oeuvre up to that time include the Constantijn Huygens Prize in 1981 and the P. C. Hooft Award in 1984. Various other prizes include the Annie Romein Prize and the Dirk Martens Prize. She has also won the Prize of the Public of the NS twice and is the only author who has written the prestigious annual "Boekenweekgeschenk" thrice, in 1948, 1959 and 1994 respectively.

== International recognition ==
Haasse lived in France for many years (1981–1990), and much of her work has been translated into French. The Académie Française awarded Haasse the Diplôme de médaille Argent in 1984. The next year she delivered a presentation on colonial literature at the University of Dakar. She was awarded the Officier dans l'Ordre de la Légion d'Honneur in 2000.

Haasse received an honorary literary doctorate from the University of Utrecht in 1988 and from the Belgian University of Leuven in 1995. In 1987 she had already been given an honorary membership of the Belgian Royal Literary Academy (Belgische Koninklijke Academie voor Nederlandse Taal- en Letterkunde (KANTL)) in Gent.

The Chilean Ministry of Education ('El Ministerio de education de Chile') awarded her a prize for her "universal contribution to culture" in 1996.

In 1989 the city of Boston awarded her the 'Boston Certificate of Recognition', for her book In a Dark Wood Wandering: "In recognition and appreciation of your outstanding contributions to the City of Boston and its residents".

In 1992 Haasse attended the opening of the IKAPI 'International Book Fair' in Jakarta. It was the last time she would visit her birthplace, Java, and the year her Dutch Indies literature masterpiece Heren van de Thee was published.

== Gallery ==
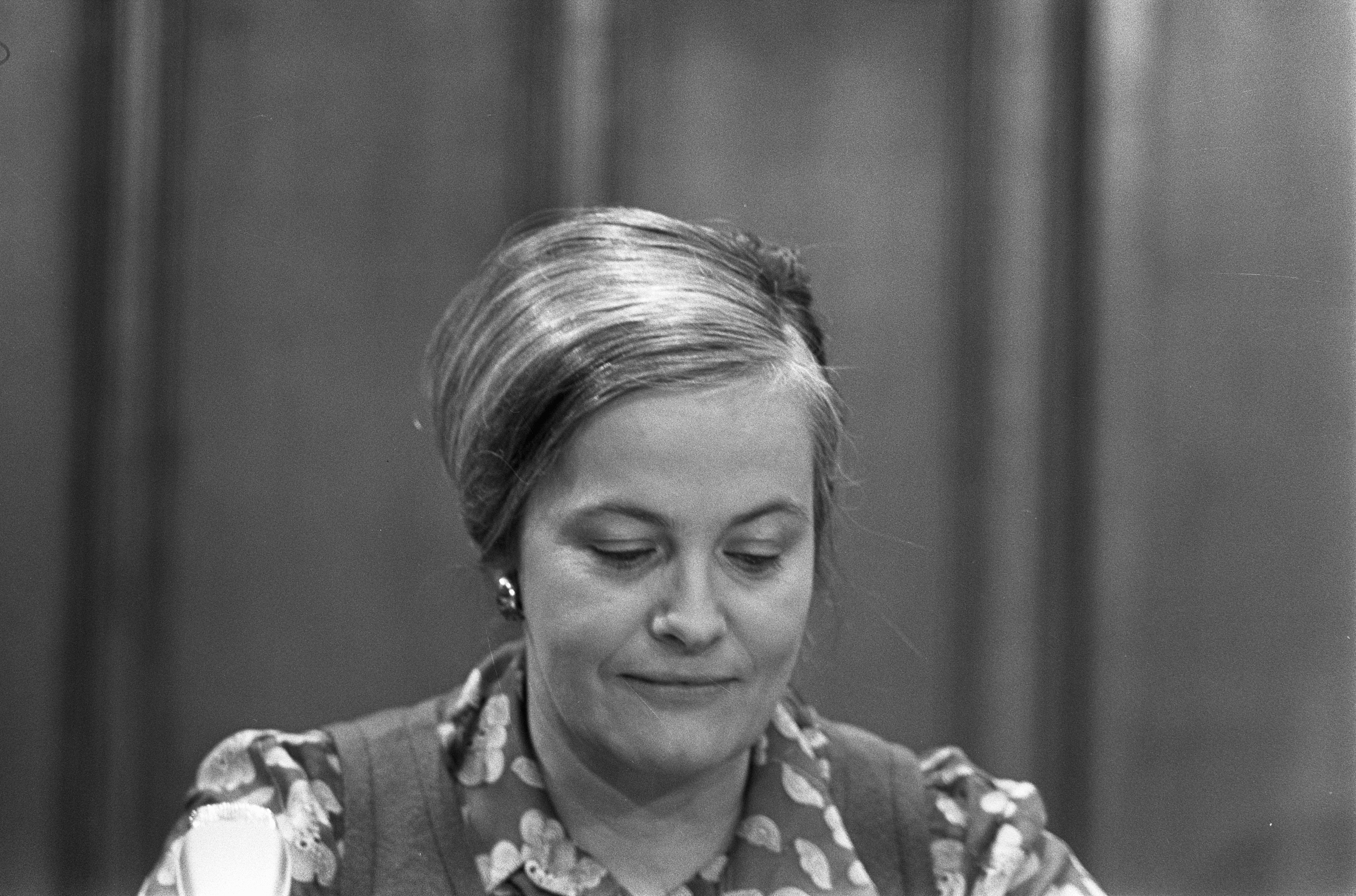
Haasse (1970)

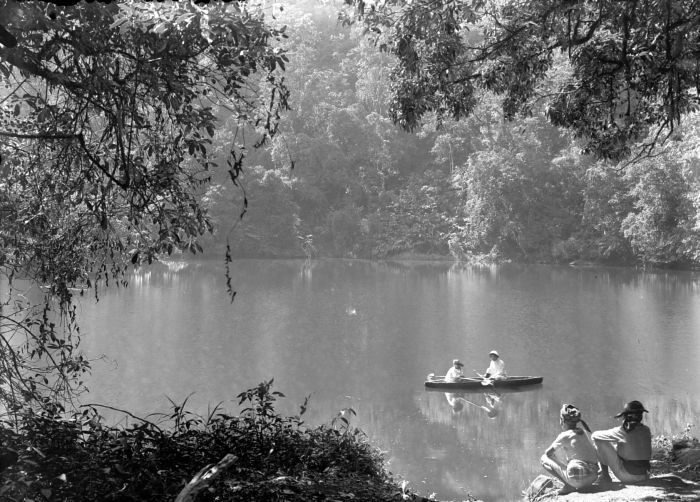
Lake Telaga Hideung on Java, close to where Hella Haasse grew up as a child and which prominently features in her debut book Oeroeg.

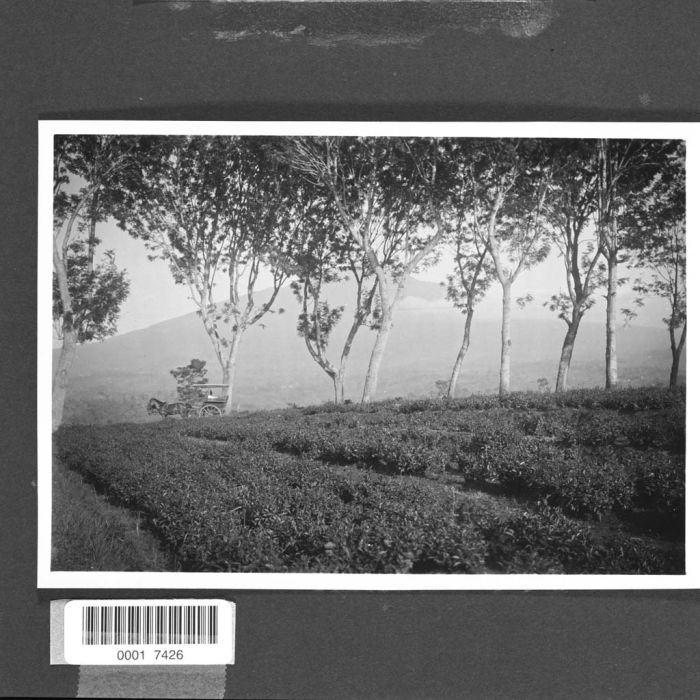
Tea plantation, Java, Dutch East Indies, 1910–1940.

== Bibliography ==
- Oeroeg – (1948); translated into English as The Black Lake, 2013.
- Het woud der verwachting – (1949); translated into English as In a Dark Wood Wandering, 1989.
- De verborgen bron – The Hidden Source (1950).
- De scharlaken stad – (1952); translated into English as The Scarlet City. A Novel of 16th-century Italy, 1952.
- De ingewijden – The Incrowd (1957).
- Cider voor arme mensen – Cider for Poor People (1960).
- Een nieuwer testament – A Newer Testament (1966); translated as Threshold of Fire. A Novel of Fifth Century Rome, 1993.
- De tuinen van Bomarzo – The Gardens of Bomarzo (1968).
- Huurders en onderhuurders – Tenants and Undertenants (1971).
- De Meester van de Neerdaling – The Master of Descent (1973).
- Een gevaarlijke verhouding of Daal-en-Bergse brieven – A Dangerous Affair or Daal-en-Bergish Letters (1976).
- Mevrouw Bentinck – Mrs. Bentinck (1978, 1982 and 1990).
- Charlotte Sophie Bentinck (1978 and 1996).
- De wegen der verbeelding – The Roads of Imagination (1983).
- Een vreemdelinge in Den Haag – (1984); translated into English as A Stranger in The Hague: The Letters of Queen Sophie of the Netherlands to Lady Malet 1842–1877, 1989.
- Berichten van het Blauwe Huis – Messages From the Blue House (1986).
- Schaduwbeeld of Het geheim van Appeltern (1989) – Shadow Picture or the Secret of Appeltern.
- Heren van de thee – The Lords of Tea (1992); translated into English by Ina Rilke as The Tea Lords, 2010.
- Een handvol achtergrond, 'Parang Sawat' - A Handful of Background, 'Parang Sawat' (1993); translated into English as Forever a Stranger and Other Stories, including Oeroeg, 1996.
- Transit (1994).
- Overeenkomstig en onvergelijkbaar (1995).
- Toen ik schoolging (1996).
- Ogenblikken in Valois – essays (1996)
- Uitgesproken opgeschreven. Essays over achttiende-eeuwse vrouwen, een bosgezicht, verlichte geesten, vorstenlot, satire, de pers en Vestdijks avondrood (1996).
- Zwanen schieten (1997).
- Lezen achter de letters – essays (2000).
- Fenrir: een lang weekend in de Ardennen (2000).
- Sleuteloog (2002); won Dutch prize NS-Publieksprijs 2003.
- Het dieptelood van de herinnering – autobiographical (2003).
- Oeroeg – een begin (2004); facsimile-edition on the occasion of Dutch prize Prijs der Nederlandse Letteren.
- Over en weer – stories (2005).
- Het tuinhuis – stories (2006).
- Een kruik uit Arelate (2006); available as podcast.
- Sterrenjacht (2007); Het Parool publication, 1950.
- De handboog der verbeelding – interviews (2007).
- Uitzicht (2008).

== See also ==
Authors of Dutch Indies literature

- Louis Couperus (1863–1923)
- Victor Ido (1869–1948)
- Ernest Douwes Dekker (1879–1950)
- Maria Dermoût (1888–1962)
- Edgar du Perron (1899–1940)
- Beb Vuyk (1905–1991)
- Rob Nieuwenhuys (1908–1999)
- Adriaan van Dis (1946– )
- Ernst Jansz (1948– )
- Marion Bloem (1952– )
