= Dutch Indies literature =

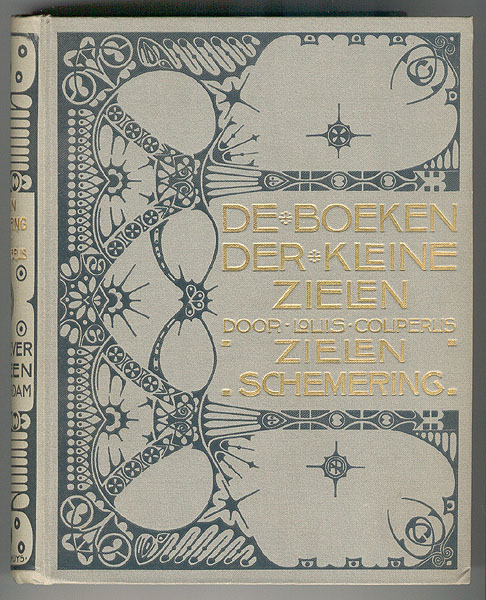
Bookcover of De boeken der kleine zielen - Zielenschemering. First print 1901, by Couperus.

Dutch Indies literature or Dutch East Indies literature (Dutch: Indische letteren or Nederlands Indische literatuur, Indonesia: Sastra Hindia Belanda) is the Dutch language literature of colonial and post-colonial Indonesia from the Dutch Golden Age to the present day. It includes Dutch, Indo-European and Indonesian authors. Its subject matter thematically revolves around the VOC and Dutch East Indies eras, but also includes the postcolonial discourse.

Even though the socio-economic environment of the Dutch East Indies' colonial society was not particularly conducive to literary pursuits an influential Dutch literary subgenre developed described as follows:

[...] a descriptive quality about them in the way they treated ordinary aspects of life in the Indies. This set them for ever apart from those writings in Europe, even if the language was still Dutch. It was this backdrop, or decor, that was different. The idea that whilst the language was Dutch, the scene, the scenery, everything was somehow different. This sense of the different permeated all that was written, even if their own (authors) reference point was still a belief that they were part of the metropolitan literary tradition.

—Ian Campbell, Sydney University, 2000.

Most masterpieces in this genre have international appeal and have been translated to English. In December 1958 for instance American Time magazine praised the translation of Maria Dermoût's The Ten Thousand Things, and named it one of the best books of the year. Since 1985 academic working groups on Dutch Indies literature have existed in the Netherlands and the USA. The University of Massachusetts Amherst maintains a Library of the Indies and describes this literature as follows:

It is a literature of great creativity and irony, a record of the lost cause and expectations of a colonial power.

== Canon of Dutch Indies literature ==
The three iconic authors of the 19th century are Multatuli, P. A. Daum and Louis Couperus.

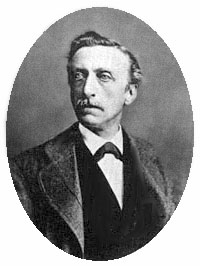
Eduard Douwes Dekker aka Multatuli (1820-1887)

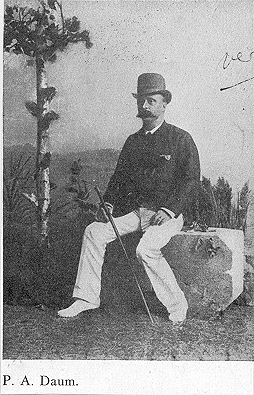
P. A. Daum (1850–1898)

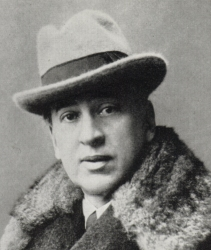
Louis Couperus (1863–1923)

Mandatory reading when studying Dutch Indies literature includes:

- Multatuli: Max Havelaar (1860); (Multatuli. Max Havelaar: Or The Coffee Auctions of the Dutch Trading Company. Translated by Roy Edwards. Introduction by D. H. Lawrence. Afterword by E. M. Beekman)
- P. A. Daum: Uit de suiker in de tabak (1884) and Goena Goena (1889);
- Louis Couperus: De stille kracht (1900); (L. Couperus. E. M. Beekman, ed. The Hidden Force. Translated by Alexander Teixeira de Mattos. Revised and edited, with an introduction and notes by E. M. Beekman.)
- E. du Perron: Het land van herkomst (1935); (E.du Perron. Country of Origin. Translated by Francis Bulhof and Elizabeth Daverman. Introduction and notes by Francis Bulhof.)
- Maria Dermoût: De tienduizend dingen (1955); (Maria Dermoût. The Ten Thousand Things. Translated by Hans Koning. Afterword by E. M. Beekman.)
- Hella S. Haasse: Oeroeg (1948), Heren van de Thee (1992) and Sleuteloog (2002); (The Lords of Tea (1992) translated into English by Ina Rilke as The Tea Lords, 2010.)
- Vincent Mahieu (aka Tjalie Robinson): Tjoek (1955) and Tjies (1960);
- Jeroen Brouwers: Bezonken rood (1981);
- Marion Bloem: Geen gewoon Indisch meisje (1983);
- Rudy Kousbroek: Het Oostindisch kampsyndroom (1992);
- Adriaan van Dis: Indische duinen (1994). (My Father's War, London, Heinemann, 2004) and Familieziek (2002) (Family Fray)
- Alfred Birney: De tolk van Java (2016); (The Interpreter from Java. Translated by David Doherty.)

== Academic authorities ==
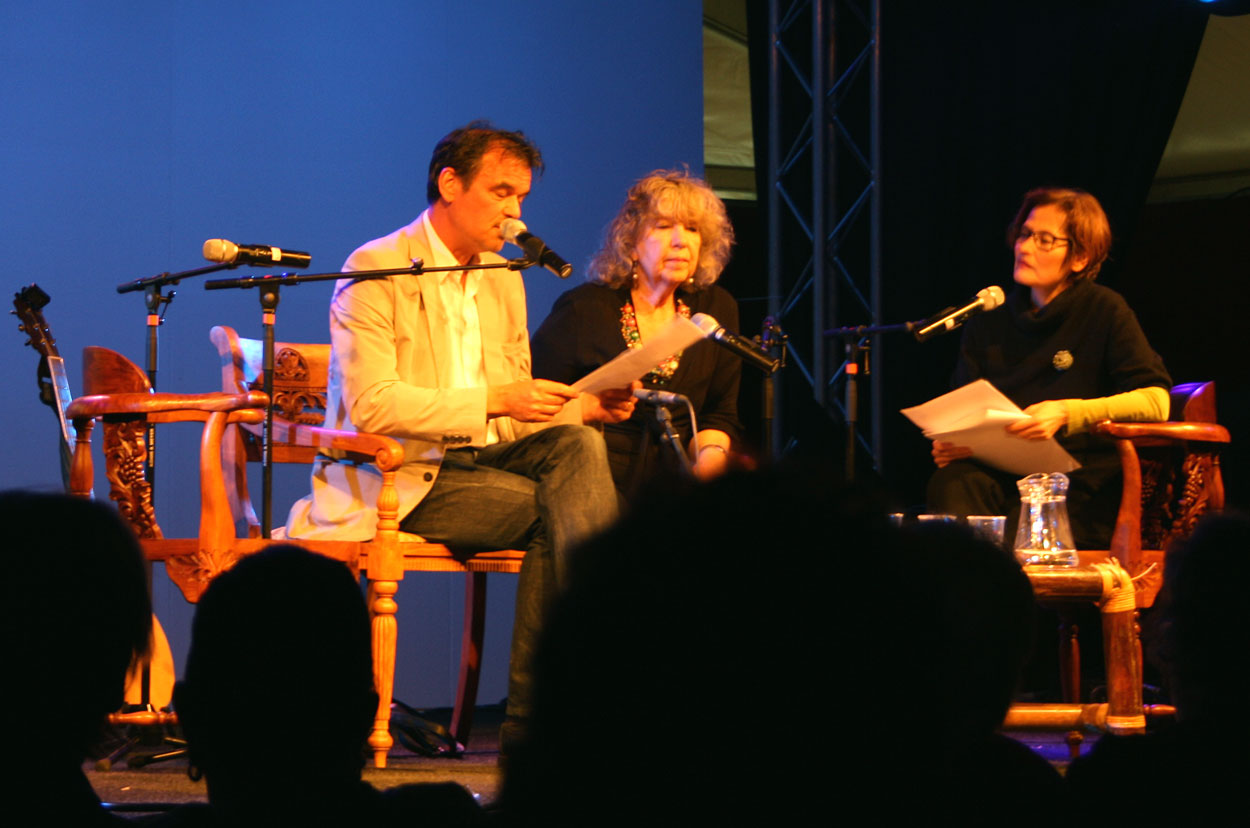
Professor Dr. Pamela Pattynama hosting literary talk show with guest authors Ernst Jansz and Helga Ruebsamen at the 2011 Tong Tong Fair in the Hague.

The two authoritative reference books on Dutch Indies literature are the "Oostindische spiegel" by literary historian Rob Nieuwenhuys and "Paradijzen van weleer" by literary professor E.M. Beekman. Nieuwenhuys (1908–1999) born in the Dutch East Indies and of Indo descent from his mother's side is the nestor of Dutch Indies literature.

The most important American literary professor specialised in Dutch Indies literature was E.M.Beekman (1939-2008), who spent his early childhood in the Dutch East Indies, and was associated with the University of Massachusetts. With the support of the 'Translations Program' of the 'National Endowment for the Humanities', the 'Foundation for the Promotion of the Translation of Dutch Literary Work', and the 'Prince Bernhard Fund', Beekman has edited many translations of Dutch Indies literature and published widely on the topic.

In recent years the University of California, Berkeley has shown particular interest in the Dutch Indies subject matter. Berkeley professor J. Dewulf is now a driving force behind further study and deepening of existing knowledge with initiatives such as the 'Amerindo Research Project' and the 2011 'International Conference on Colonial and Post-Colonial Connections in Dutch Literature'.

In the Netherlands the leading professor is Pamela Pattynama associated with Amsterdam University.

== Indo European authors ==
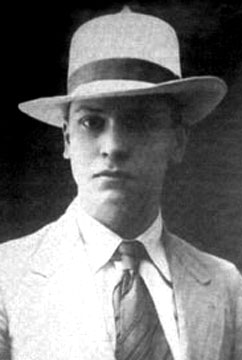
E. du Perron

Seventy-five percent of the Dutch speaking community in the Dutch East Indies were so called Indo-Europeans, i.e. Eurasians belonging to the European legal class. Although most published work was written by full blooded Dutchmen, so called 'Totoks', many Indo authors have also written Dutch Indies literature covering a vast array of topics. While Louis Couperus wrote about the upper class elite, Victor Ido wrote about the lower class paupers.

After the Indo diaspora from the former Dutch East Indies (now: Indonesia) Indo authors have mostly contributed to the postcolonial discourse of a.o. identity formation.

=== List of Indo authors ===
A considerable number of authors of Dutch Indies literature are Indo-European i.e. Dutch-Indonesian Eurasians. Authors include:

- Louis Couperus (1863–1923)
- Victor Ido (1869–1948)
- Ernest Douwes Dekker (1879–1950)
- Maria Dermoût (1888–1962)
- Edgar du Perron (1899–1940)
- Beb Vuyk (1905–1991)
- Rob Nieuwenhuys (1908–1999)

Much of the postcolonial literary discourse has been written by second generation immigrant authors of Indo (Eurasian) descent. Authors include:

- Adriaan van Dis (1946– )
- Ernst Jansz (1948– )
- Marion Bloem (1952– )

The most significant and influential author that studied postcolonial identity formation however is the avant garde and visionary writer Tjalie Robinson (1911–1974), a first generation repatriant.

== Indonesian authors ==
During the "Dutch Ethical Policy" in the interbellum period of the first half of the twentieth century, indigenous authors and intellectuals from the Dutch East Indies came to the Netherlands to study and/or work. During their stay of some years they participated in and contributed to the Dutch literary system.

By exploring new literary themes and/or focusing on indigenous protagonists, they drew at the same time attention to indigenous culture and the indigenous plight. An early example was the Javanese prince and poet Noto Soeroto, a writer and journalist from the Dutch East Indies. He was not a radical Indonesian nationalist, but a supporter of the so-called association politics, which sought collaboration between the Dutch and the native peoples of the Dutch East Indies.

Noto Soeroto came to the Netherlands to study law in Leiden in 1910. He published in the avant-garde review Het Getij. His non-political poems were published in many volumes. They had exotic titles such as Melati-knoppen, Melati buds, De geur van moeders haarwrong, the odour/smell of mothers hair knot or Lotos of morgendauw, Lotos or morning dew. He wrote a famous brochure on Kartini, the Javanese princess and Indonesian national heroine, whose popular letters were published in 1912 and also contributed to Dutch Indies literature.

Although Dutch had no formal status in the Dutch East Indies, among the indigenous elite of the colony many were fluent in the Dutch language. Authors include: Chairil Anwar; Soewarsih Djojopoespito; Noto Soeroto; Sutan Sjahrir; Kartini.

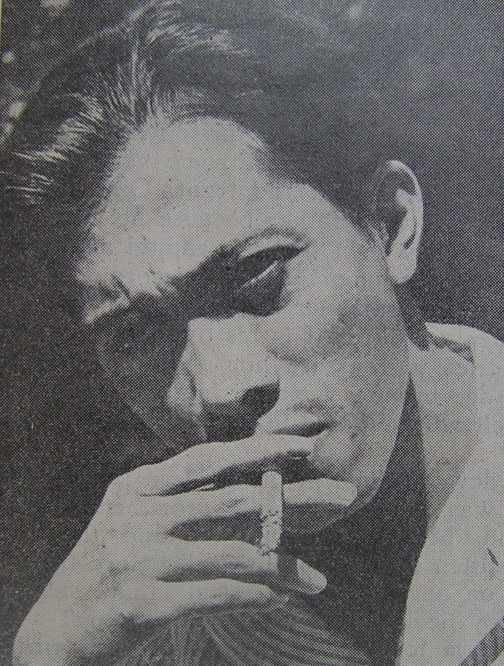
Chairil Anwar

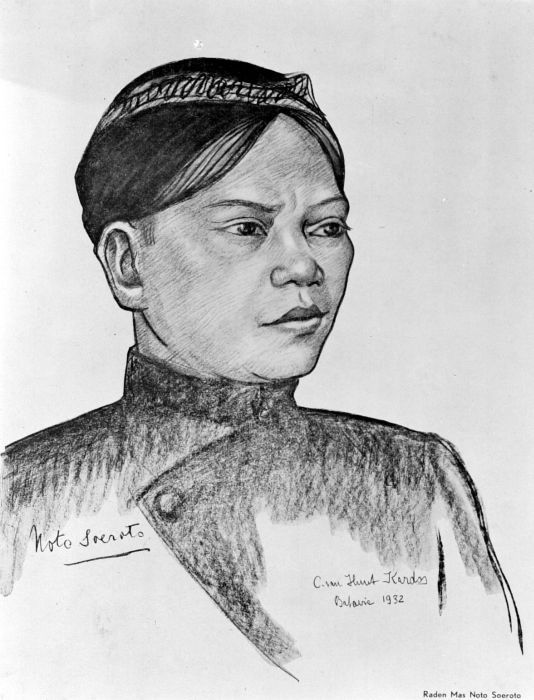
Raden Mas, Noto Soeroto

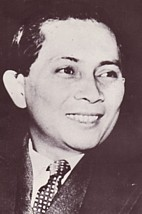
Soetan Sjahrir

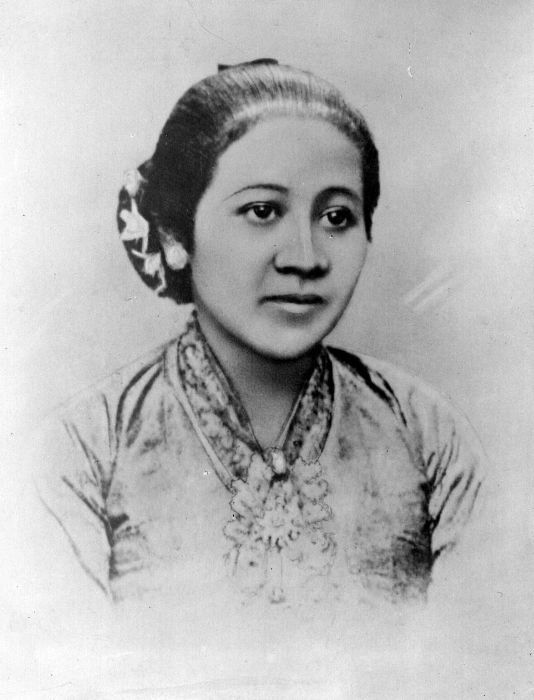
Raden Ajeng Kartini

Sukarno

The wider definition of Dutch Indies literature also includes Sukarno's historic defence speech at his 1930 trial in Bandung. Another historic piece is Sutan Sjahrir's political pamphlet Onze Strijd (Our Struggle) or his book Indonesische Overpeinzingen (Indonesian Musings) of 1945, which were first written in Dutch and only later translated to Indonesian and English.

== List of Dutch Indies literature authors ==
- Onno Zwier van Haren (1713–1779) Sultan van Bantam (1979)
- Wolter Robert, Baron van Hoevell (1812–1879)
- Multatuli (1820–1887)
- Conrad Busken Huet (1826–1886)
- Justus van Maurik (1846–1905) Indrukken van een Totok (1897)
- P. A. Daum (1850–1898)
- Louis Couperus (1863–1923)
- Victor Ido (1869–1948)
- Jan Fabricius (1871-1964)
- Ernest Douwes Dekker (1879–1950)
- Henri van Wermeskerken (1882-1937)
- Maria Dermoût (1888–1962)
- Edgar du Perron (1899–1940)
- Madelon Szekely-Lulofs (1899–1958) Rubber (1931) Koelie (1931)
- Johan Fabricius (1899–1981) De Scheepsjongens van Bontekoe (1923)
- Beb Vuyk (1905–1991)
- Rob Nieuwenhuys (1908–1999) Oostindische spiegel (1972)
- Tjalie Robinson (1911–1974)
- Suwarsih Djojopuspito (1912–1977)
- Hella Haasse (1918–2011)
- Ernst Jansz (1948– )
- Marion Bloem (1952– )
- A. Alberts
- Chairil Anwar
- Augusta de Wit
- Han Friedericy
- Kartini
- Rudy Kousbroek
- Gertrudes Johannes Resink
- Helga Ruebsamen
- Soetan Sjahrir
- Noto Soeroto
- F. Springer
- Ewald Vanvugt
- Marie van Zeggelen
- Willem Walraven
- Aya Zikken

== See also ==
- Canon of Dutch Literature
- Dutch literature
- Indonesian literature
- Indos in colonial history
- List of Dutch language writers
