= Adriaan van Dis =

Dutch author

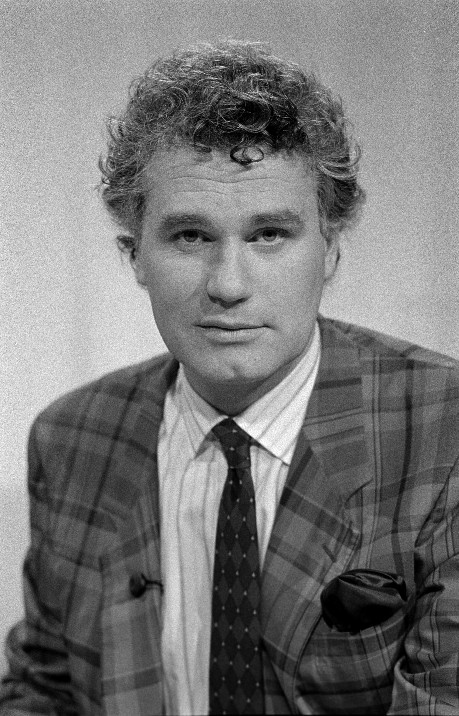
- Born: 16 December 1946 (age 79) Bergen aan Zee, Netherlands
- Genre: Novella, Novel
- Years active: 1983- present

Website
- adriaanvandis.nl

Adriaan van Dis (Bergen aan Zee, 16 December 1946) is a Dutch author. He debuted in 1983 with the novella Nathan Sid. In 1995 his book Indische Duinen (My Father's War), which in its narrative is a follow-up to his debut novella, was also awarded several prestigious literary awards.

He is also known as the host of his own award-winning television talkshow named Hier is... Adriaan van Dis, that lasted from 1983 to 1992 and several successful award-winning television documentaries.

With the publication of his Indies inspired compilation book De Indie boeken (The Indies books) in 2012, van Dis establishes himself as one of the most significant second generation authors of Dutch Indies literature.

== Life ==
=== Youth ===
His father was born in the Dutch East Indies to Dutch parents and his mother a farmer's daughter from Breda who had met each other in the Dutch East Indies after the War. By then his mother already had three daughters from her first marriage to a Royal Dutch East Indies Army KNIL officer of Indo-European descent. His father had been married before as well, in the East Indies. His family had been heavily affected by the Second World War and the subsequent Indonesian revolution.

As a survivor of the Junyo Maru disaster, which had been mistakenly torpedoed by the British, his father performed forced labour as a POW on the Pakan Baroe railroad on Sumatra. Adriaan van Dis's mother's first husband was a resistance fighter and was decapitated during the Japanese occupation (1942–1945). His mother ended up in a Japanese internment camp along with her 3 young daughters.

Adriaan, born after the war, in the Netherlands, felt like an outsider in his own family because he was the only white child and had no direct history in the Indies or of the war. His environment contributed to this sense of loneliness. Bergen aan Zee was home to many people who had come from the Dutch East Indies and Adriaan grew up in a house that he shared with four repatriated families of mostly Indo-European descent.

Adriaan's parents were unable to get married. While his father's marriage had been disbanded under Islamic law, that divorce had no legal validity in the Netherlands. Nobody was allowed to know this, and so, for the sake of the outside world, Adriaan took on his father's surname: Mulder. However, officially his surname remained his mother's: van Dis. When Adriaan went to college, he began using his real name. Later in life while working on his autobiographic novels van Dis discovered that out of spite his father's family hid the fact that his father was in fact already a widower.

His father had been traumatised by the war and was unable to work. Furthermore, he found it difficult to find a place in the Netherlands as a migrant; he never felt like he fit in. He was always home and raised Adriaan in a conservative manner, frequently beating him. Adriaan remembers him as a cruel man, but also as a victim of circumstances. He is one of his main literary inspirations and his perspective on his father evolves with each related novel.

=== Education ===
His father died in 1956 when Adriaan was ten. Despite their difficult relationship, Adriaan was hit hard by his loss, which had a negative effect on his performance in school. He was a student of the Outward Bound School in the Netherlands in the month August 1964. He initiated and implemented the school journal "De Blaer" (The Blister), together with editor Cees Breure and illustrator Henk Jansen. In his novel "Zilver" (1988) he expresses the perceived sensitivity of the course. Through various schools however, he ended up in Amsterdam to study Dutch. There he came into contact with Afrikaans. Within that language he recognized much of the Petjo that his family had jokingly spoken at home occasionally: a Dutch-Malay creole language with many unusual intonations. Van Dis also identified with the charged discussions of skin color in South African literature. In 1979 he received his doctoral degree with a dissertation about a text by the author Breyten Breytenbach, who was to influence his later writing, and some of whose books van Dis has translated into Dutch.

=== Career ===
During his college days van Dis was already working as editor with the NRC Handelsblad and after graduating he remained connected to the paper until 1982, working for the Saturday Supplement. His debut novella "Nathan Sid" came out of a regular cooking column in which he wrote about his memories of food. Those memories were strongly connected to the struggles between his parents – between the potatoes and the rice. Publisher J.M. Meulenhoff turned these contributions into a short book. Van Dis had little confidence in its success, but it was received with great enthusiasm, and received the Gouden Ezelsoor literary prize for best sold debut in 1984.

In 1983 van Dis also made his debut as television presenter and became known in the Netherlands through a literary talk show. This show aired until 3 May 1992. From 1999 until 2002 he returned to host a television show entitled "Zomergasten", with which he ended, according to himself, his TV career.

Adriaan van Dis is a prolific writer whose work is very popular in the Netherlands, where he is a household name. In 2008 he decided to briefly resume his television career with a 7-part series entitled "Van Dis in Afrika" in which he reported on his travels to Southern Africa. The series won the "Zilveren Nipkowschijf"

In 2012 van Dis successfully returned to national television with a popular documentary TV series about Dutch roots in contemporary Indonesia. The Dutch institute for TV classification tried to have parts of the show censored. After which van Dis reacted with: "Have they learned nothing from Multatuli?"

== Bibliography ==
Adriaan van Dis's work includes novels, novellas, short stories, essays, poetry and plays. His work can largely be divided into three categories. The first part is inspired by his many travels to China, Africa, Japan, Morocco and Mozambique amongst others. Examples of such work include ""Casablanca" (1986) and "In Afrika" (1991). The second part of his work concerns his Indies youth, like "Nathan Sid" (1983), "Indische Duinen" (1994) and "Familieziek" (2002). The third category include the novels about emerging homosexuality, which includes "Zilver" (1988) and "Dubbelliefde" (1999).

Dualism is an important theme in the work of van Dis. His books are rife with antitheses, such as black/white, social/anti-social and heritage/own identity. His style, which was praised even at the publication of "Nathan Sid", is often light and simple. That simplicity is often deceptive and necessary to touch on subjects of a controversial and/or delicate nature, such as traumas of war, discrimination and abuse.

In 2026, Van Dis wrote about his liaison of almost 38 years with Ellen Jens in his novel Alles voor de reis. Een roman over liefde en leugens (Everything for the voyage. A novel about love and lies). The affair ended with her death. In this book he calls her Eefje. She was married to Wim T. Schippers.

=== Novels ===
- 1987 Een barbaar in China: een reis door Centraal Azië
- 1988 Zilver of Het verlies van de onschuld
- 1990 Het beloofde land: een reis door de Karoo
- 1991 In Afrika
- 1994 Indische Duinen – Translation: My Father's War
- 1999 Dubbelliefde: geschiedenis van een jongeman
- 2002 Familieziek – Translation: Repatriated, a novel in 60 scenes
- 2007 De wandelaar
- 2010 Tikkop
- 2014 Ik kom terug
- 2017 De Zuid–Afrika boeken
- 2017 In het buitengebied
- 2021 KliFi
- 2026 Alles voor de reis. Een roman over liefde en leugens

=== Novellas ===
- 1983 Nathan Sid
- 1986 De vraatzuchtige spreekt
- 1986 De rat van Arras
- 1987 Zoen
- 1996 Palmwijn ("Boekenweekgeschenk")
- 2000 Op oorlogspad in Japan

=== Short stories ===
- 1984 Een bord met spaghetti
- 1986 Casablanca
- 1988 Een keuze uit mijn vrolijke doodsgedachten
- 1992 De man uit het Noorden
- 1992 Waar twee olifanten vechten – Mozambique in oorlog
- 1993 Classics
- 1995 Wij, koningin
- 1997 Een waarze sat
- 2003 Vrijtaal
- 2007 Leeftocht. veertig jaar onderweg ISBN 978-90-457-0067-0

=== Drama ===
- 1986 Tropenjaren: De zaak
- 1988 Komedie om geld, Een uur in de wind

=== Non-fiction ===
- 1992 Alles is te koop (manifesto)
- 1998 Een deken van herinnering (essay)
- 1998 Totok (poetry)
- 2004 Onder het zink. Un abécédaire de Paris (essay)
- 2007 Op de televisie (memoir)
- 2008 Van Dis in Afrika (documentary series)

== Literary prizes ==
- 1984 The Gouden Ezelsoor for Nathan Sid
- 1994 The Nieuwe Clercke-Pico Bello-prize for his services to Dutch literature
- 1995 Gouden Uil for Indische Duinen
- 1995 Trouw Publieksprijs for Indische Duinen
- 2007 Groenman Taalprijs from the Stichting Lout, part of the Onze Taal society, for his clear and creative use of language
- 2009 The Gouden Ganzenveer
- 2015 Libris Prize for his novel Ik kom terug, about his relationship with his mother.

== See also ==
=== Other Dutch Indies authors ===
- Louis Couperus (1863–1923)
- Victor Ido (1869–1948)
- Ernest Douwes Dekker (1879–1950)
- Maria Dermoût (1888–1962)
- Edgar du Perron (1899–1940)
- Beb Vuyk (1905–1991)
- Rob Nieuwenhuys (1908–1999)
- Tjalie Robinson (1911–1974)
- Ernst Jansz (1948- )
- Marion Bloem (1952- )
