= Marion Bloem =

Dutch writer and director

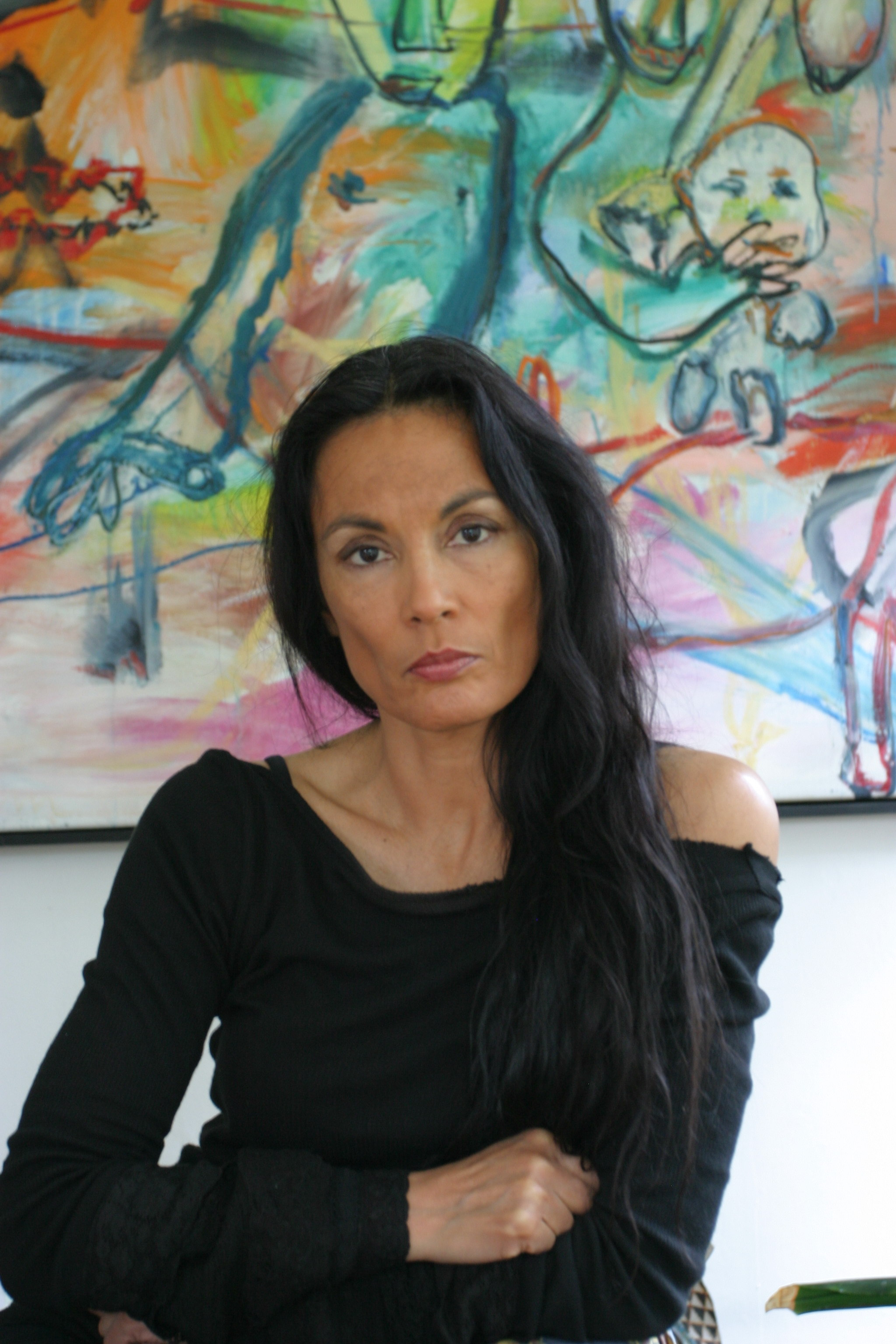
- Marion Bloem, Indo author, 2007.
- Born: August 24, 1952 (age 74); Arnhem, Netherlands
- Occupations: Author, Director, Painter, Psychologist

Marion Bloem (born 24 August 1952 in Arnhem, the Netherlands) is a Dutch writer and film maker of Indo (mixed Dutch and Indonesian) descent, best known as author of the literary acclaimed book Geen gewoon Indisch meisje (No Ordinary Indo Girl) and director of the 2008 feature film Ver van familie (Far from Family).

Bloem is a second generation Indo immigrant born into a family of four children. Her parents, Alexander and Jacqueline Bloem, repatriated from Indonesia in 1950. Her father is a survivor of the Junyo Maru disaster. Bloem, herself a psychologist, is married to Dutch author and physician Ivan Wolffers. She has one son named Kaja and four grandchildren.

In addition to her career as an author and film director, Bloem is a painter who exhibits around Europe.

== Books ==
Bloem's first short story was published in 1968, when she was only 16 years old. Bloem made her bona fide debut as a writer in 1976, with the book De overgang (The Transition). She continued to write several more books, including the children's book Matabia in 1981, which received the 'Smelik Prize' from the ‘International Board on Books for Young People’. In 1983 she published her literary acclaimed breakthrough novel Geen gewoon meisje, which describes the duality and paradox of an Indo (Eurasian) girl, followed in 1989 by the novel Vaders van betekenis, loosely translated to Noteworthy Fathers, which describes the relationship of an Indo girl towards her Indo parents and Indo father in particular. She continues to write successful books, often around the topics of (Indo) identity and immigration. In 2009 she wrote Vervlochten grenzen (Intertwined Borders) about the triangular relationship between the Dutch East Indies, the Netherlands and Indonesia. For this book she received an 'E. du Perron Prize' nomination.

From the time that her husband was confronted with prostate cancer, she developed an interest in this subject and did research amongst couples who had to deal with this disease. The result ended up in the book Als je man verandert (If Your Man Changes) which she wrote together with the urologist P.Kil, published in 2010. Her latest novel is Meer dan mannelijk (More than Male) which is a natural consequence of this particular interest.

Her writing style is influenced by the Indo oral storytelling tradition and the pasar Malay language.

== Films ==
Bloem also produced a considerable number of movies and documentaries that have received several cultural awards and nominations. Her 1983 documentary Het land van mijn ouders (Land of My Parents) received both critical and commercial success. (Note: In its year of release 1983, Land of my Parents was sold out for seven consecutive weeks at seven cinemas in the Netherlands.) In 2008, her feature film Ver van familie (Far from Family) was released at the international film festival ‘Film by the Sea’ in Vlissingen and the Jakarta International Film Festival. Based on her book of the same name, she wrote the screenplay and directed several Indo iconic actors including the famous singers Anneke Grönloh and Riem de Wolff (Co-founder of the group the Blue Diamonds). The movie is set in the United States and Netherlands of the mid-1980s and shows the trials and tribulations of an American Indo girl searching for her (family) roots.

== Indo identity ==
Much of Bloem's work evolves around an artistic and sincere exploration of Indo identity and culture, which makes her one of the foremost 2nd generation Indo authors and puts her in the tradition of the legendary Tjalie Robinson. Like Robinson who explored and benchmarked his Eurasian identity from a global perspective, Bloem also puts her personal search for (Indo) identity in the broader perspective of immigration and integration.

“Being Indo is just a metaphor for being different.” Marion Bloem, 1983.

Dutch Indies literature professor Pamela Pattynama argues:

"...multi-talented Marion Bloem who takes a foremost position among the second generation Indo-Dutch authors, filmmakers and artists [...] has brought an international perspective into her books that can no longer be defined as ‘novels’. [...] Her protagonists have become transnational subjects who invent a home and shape identities through the creative re-writing of stories and myths about mixed race. [...] I would like to suggest a diasporic, transnational or pluricentric perspective which may be more productive to understand Bloem's work..."

== Selected publications ==
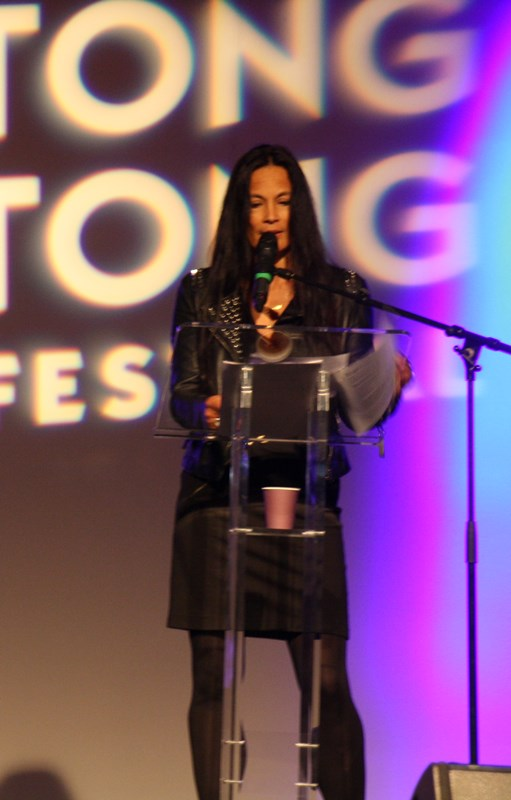
Marion Bloem @ Tong Tong Festival 2013

- Overgang (1976) (non-fiction)
- Matabia (1981)
- Geen gewoon Indisch meisje (1983)
- Vaders van betekenis (1989)
- Vliegers onder het matras (1990)
- De honden van Slipi (1992)
- De leugen van de Kaketoe (1993) (Translated to English: ‘The cocketoo's lie’)
- Muggen mensen olifanten (1995)
- Mooie meisjesmond (1997)
- Ver van familie (1998)
- Games4Girls (2001), (multimedia)
- Voor altijd moeder (2001)
- Liefde is soms lastig, liefste, (2002), (multimedia cd with visual poetry)
- Thuis (2003), (stories, poems, diaries, drawings and paintings)
- Zo groot als Hugo (2004)
- De V van Venus (2004).
- Een royaal gebaar (2005)
- In de kamer van mijn vroeger (2007) (poetry and paintings)
- Vervlochten grenzen (2009)
- "Geen Requiem" (2010) (long poem)
- "Als je man verandert" (2010) (non-fiction)
- "Meer dan mannelijk" (2011)

== See also ==
=== Other Indo authors ===
- Louis Couperus (1863–1923)
- Victor Ido (1869-1948)
- Ernest Douwes Dekker (1879–1950)
- Edgar du Perron (1899–1940)
- Beb Vuyk (1905–1991)
- Rob Nieuwenhuys (1908–1999)
- Tjalie Robinson (1911–1974)
- Adriaan van Dis (1946- )
- Ernst Jansz (1948- )
