= Rudi Jansz =

Indo-Dutch resistance fighter

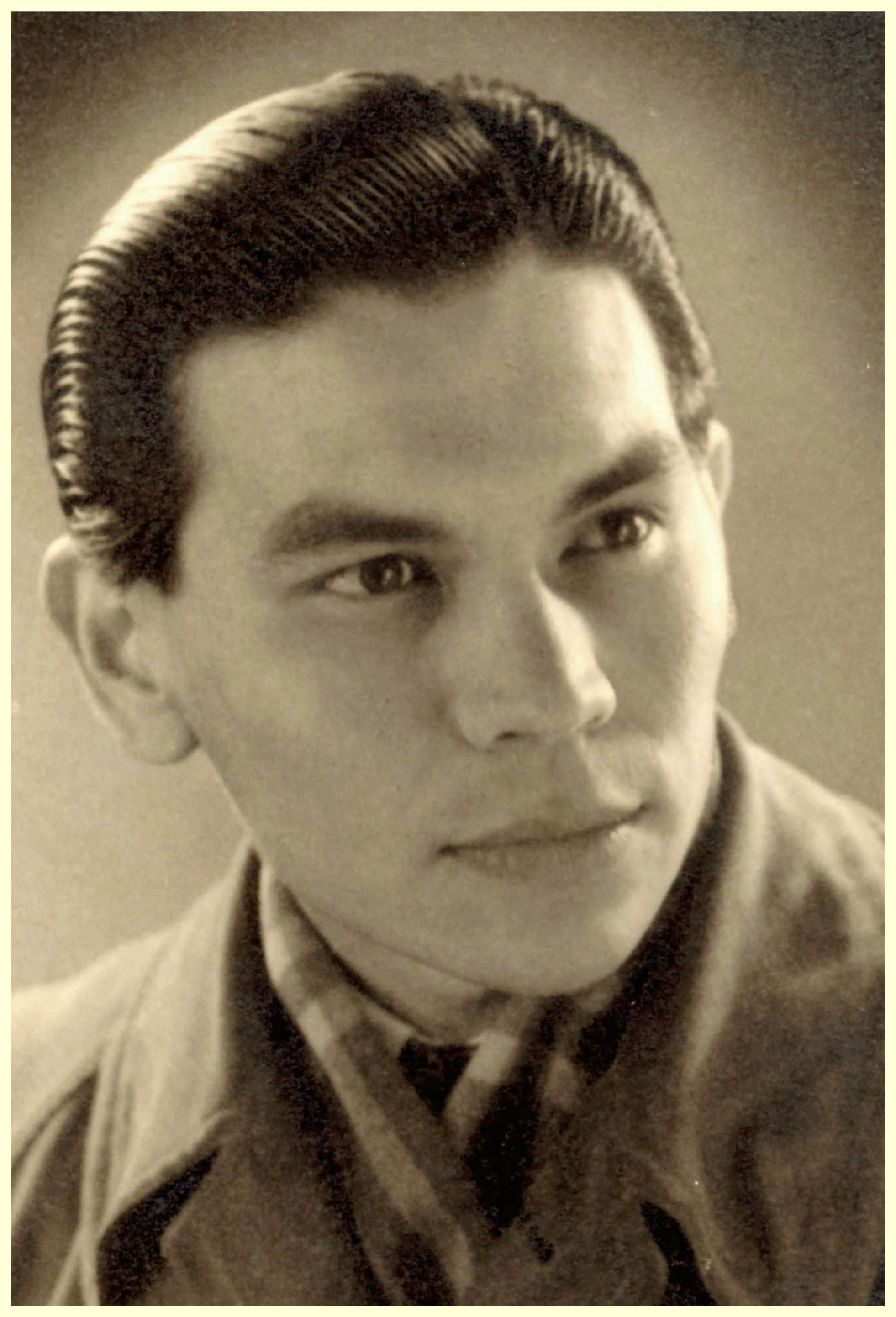
- Born: October 23, 1914; Semarang, Indonesia
- Died: August 22, 1965 (aged 50); Amsterdam, Netherlands
- Family: Ernst Jansz (Son)

Rudi Jansz (October 23, 1914 – August 22, 1964) was an Indo-Dutch resistance fighter in the Netherlands during World War II. He is the father of Dutch musician Ernst Jansz, the founder of Doe Maar.

== History ==
While studying in the Netherlands, Jansz founded the 'Indo-Nederlandsche Jongerenbond' (INJB, Indo-Dutch Youth Association). During the German occupation of the Netherlands he was active in the underground resistance. In August 1944 he got arrested in Amsterdam. From January 1945 until the liberation, he was imprisoned in Kamp Amersfoort. Hij was also a member of the 'Revolutionair Communistische Partij' (RCP, Revolutionary Communist Party). On August 17, 1945, Indonesian nationalist Sukarno proclaimed the independence. In solidarity with the Indonesian people, Rudi Jansz founded the 'Indo-Comité Vrij Indonesia' (Indo-Committee Free Indonesia). With his initiative he aimed to encourage Indo-Europeans to choose the side of the Indonesian Republic in the Indonesian Independence War (1945–1949).
