= Henri van Wermeskerken =

Dutch writer

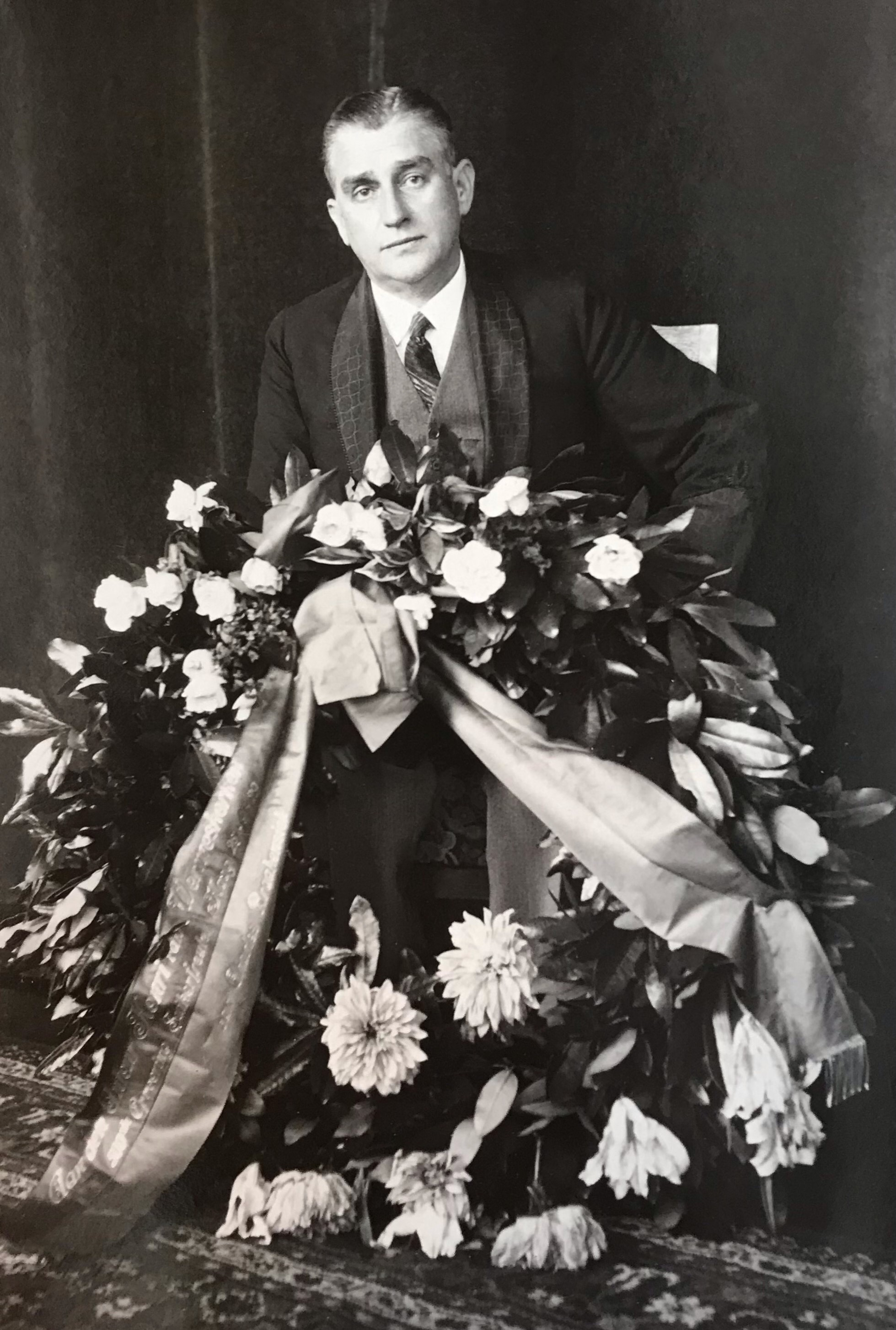
- Henri van Wermeskerken (1882-1937) during the 500th performance of his play Suikerfreule, 1929
- Born: 22 March 1882; Rotterdam, Netherlands
- Died: 7 June 1937 (aged 55); Königswinter, Netherlands
- Occupation: Writer

Johan Wilhelm Henri van Wermeskerken (22 March 1882 - 7 June 1937) was a Dutch playwright, novelist and journalist. He is considered the most prominent comedic playwright in the literature of the Dutch East Indies. His greatest successes were plays Tropenadel (1916) and Suikerfreule (1917), both of which he later adapted into novels. Despite criticism from literary figures such as Rob Nieuwenhuys and E. du Perron, Van Wermeskerken's short story collection Langs den gordel van smaragd (1923) was hailed as his masterpiece. His work was part of the literature event in the art competition at the 1928 Summer Olympics.

== Publications ==
=== Plays ===
- Tropenadel (1916)
- Goena-goena (1917); later renamed Het Spookhuis
- Suikerfreule (1917)
- Het Handschoentje (1918)
- Chauffeuse (1925); one-act play
- De tante uit Indië (1927)
- De Oceaanvlucht (1929)
- De hotelrat (1932); one-act play
- Hollands Binnenhuisje (1932); adapted from Johanna van Woude's eponymous novel

=== Prose ===
- Leo Smeder (1907)
- Van het wondere Geluk (1908)
- Smeder & zoon (1908)
- De Armen van Geest (1909)
- Door Spanje (1910)
- De assenhoeve (1911)
- De profundis clamavi: de biecht eener moeder (1913)
- Tropenadel: Van Vliet, Sweet & Cy (1918)
- Roemah angker (1922)
- Langs den gordel van smaragd (1923)
- Een Indisch binnenhuisje (1924)
- Suikerfreule (1925)
- De Armen van Geest (1928)
- Boy (1930); revised edition of Leo Smeder
- Het Manneneiland (1931)
- Tropische zoutwaterliefde (1932)
- De Groene Hel: Het blanke mysterie van de Matto Grosso (1933)
- Terschelling, de parel van de Waddenzee (1935)
