= Noto Soeroto =

Javanese writer (1888–1951)

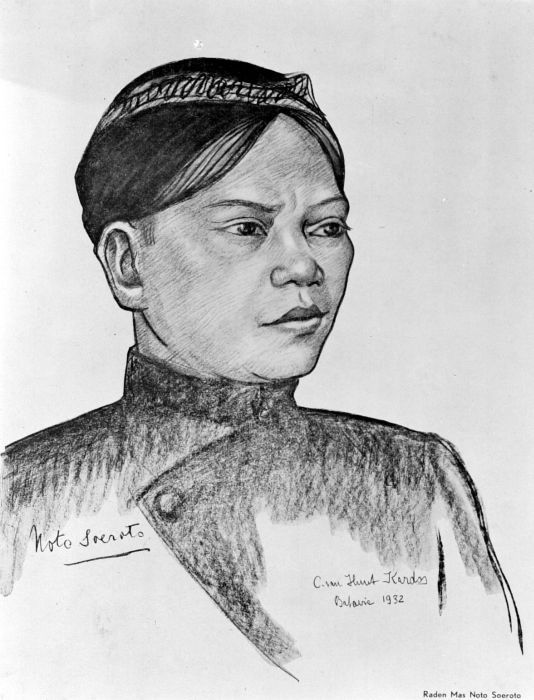
- Born: Raden Mas Noto Soeroto; 1888
- Died: 1951 (aged 62–63)
- Occupation: Prince

Raden Mas Noto Soeroto (1888–1951) was a Javanese prince from the Jogjakarta noble house of Paku Alaman and was a poet and writer of Dutch Indies literature and journalist from the Dutch East Indies (now: Indonesia). He significantly contributed to the Dutch literary system by exploring new literary themes and focusing on indigenous protagonists, at the same time drawing attention to indigenous culture and the indigenous plight.

== Life ==
Noto Soeroto came to the Netherlands to study law in Leiden in 1910. During his stay in the Netherlands, his many publications included contributions to important literary reviews such as the avant-garde Het Getij, De Gemeenschap, Links Richten, and Forum. His poems were published in many volumes and translated into many languages. They had exotic titles such as Melati-knoppen, Melati buds, De geur van moeders haarwrong, the odor/smell of mothers hair knot or Lotos of morgendauw, Lotos or morning dew. He wrote a famous brochure on Kartini, the Javanese princess and Indonesian national heroine, whose popular letters were published in 1912 and also contributed to Dutch Indies literature.

He was not a radical Indonesian nationalist, but a supporter of the so-called association politics, which sought collaboration between the Dutch and the native peoples of the Dutch East Indies. In his literary magazine Oedaya (English: Sunrise), founded in 1923, he claims to be "under no influence of any political party, nor any private interest." The editors of his magazine, he said are "solely guided by a constructive attitude towards the relationship between the Netherlands and Indonesia." "Calm, gradualism and naturalness, symbolized in a sunrise" were the guidelines for the magazine to contribute to the (sun)rise of Indonesia.

In 1918 he married his Dutch wife Jo Meyer with whom he had three Indo children. His first son was Rawindro (1918), a daughter Dewatya (1922), and another son Harindro Dirodjo (1928). During WWII his wife and two oldest children would be part of the Dutch resistance fighting Nazi occupation of the Netherlands. Soeroto returned to Java by himself in 1932, where he became the personal secretary of his old friend Duke Mangkunegara VII of a noble house of Solo. During the Japanese occupation of the Dutch East Indies in WWII Soeroto was assumed anti-Axis powers and taken prisoner and tortured by the Kempeitai. After the war and the death of Mangkunegara VII, he became a journalist but died in impoverished circumstances.

== Poetry ==
His poetry book Wayang Songs was translated into French and German. Here he also managed to describe what he felt was his destiny.

"This is my earthly life, full of trouble and struggle, and many are my enemies, laughing at me. Their honing hit the target faster than feathered arrows, their words sharper than the Kris. My fight isn't over yet.[...]Lord, let me be a Wayang in your hands. Then after one hundred years or one thousand years, Thy hand shall move me again. Then when my time will dawn again in your eternity, Thou shalt lift me up and again I will speak and fight. And then my enemies will be silenced and the demon will crash down. Lord, let me be a Wayang in your hands."

== Legacy ==
Indonesian President Sukarno cited Soeroto's poetry on the occasion of the naming and foundation of Indonesia's national airline Garuda in 1949. "Ik ben Garuda, Vishnoe's vogel, die zijn vleugels uitslaat hoog boven uw eilanden.", "I am Garuda, Vishnu's bird, spreading my wings high above your islands."

The 1958 novel Schimmenspel by Dutch author Johan Fabricius is loosely based on the life of Noto Soeroto.

== Publications ==
- Melatiknoppen (1915) Melati buds
- De geur van moeders haarwrong (1916) The smell of mothers hair knot
- Fluisteringen van den avondwind (1917) Whispers of the evening breeze
- Bloeme-ketenen (1918) Flower chains
- Lotos en morgendauw (1920) Lotos and morning dew
- Kleurschakeeringen (1925) Shades of color
- Nieuwe fluisteringen van den avondwind (1925) New whispers of the evening breeze
- Wayang-liederen (1931) Wayang Songs
- Goden, mensen dieren (1956) Gods, men, animals

== See also ==
- Dutch Indies literature
