= In a Dark Wood Wandering =

1949 novel by Hella S. Haasse

- First edition
- Author: Hella S. Haase
- Original title: Het woud der verwachting
- Translator: Lewis C. Kaplan, Translator, revised and edited by Anita Miller
- Language: Dutch
- Publisher: Academy Chicago Publishers (English)
- Publication date: 1949
- English publication date: 1989
- Pages: 574
- ISBN: 0-89733-336-5

In a Dark Wood Wandering (original title Het woud der verwachting) is a 1949 Dutch novel by Hella S. Haasse. It was translated from the Dutch into English in 1989 by Lewis C. Kaplan and revised and edited by Academy Chicago.

== Synopsis ==
The story is set in the fifteenth century, during the Hundred Years War. The book opens with the christening of Charles, son of Louis I, Duke of Orleans and his wife Valentine, who is not well enough to attend and must remain in her chambers. Among those attending is Charles VI and his wife Isabeau. Charles VI has been suffering from madness, and it has reached the point where he doesn't recognize his own wife. Poet François Villon also appears in the novel, first as a young man, later as an adult visiting the royal court.
