= Rob Nieuwenhuys =

Dutch writer

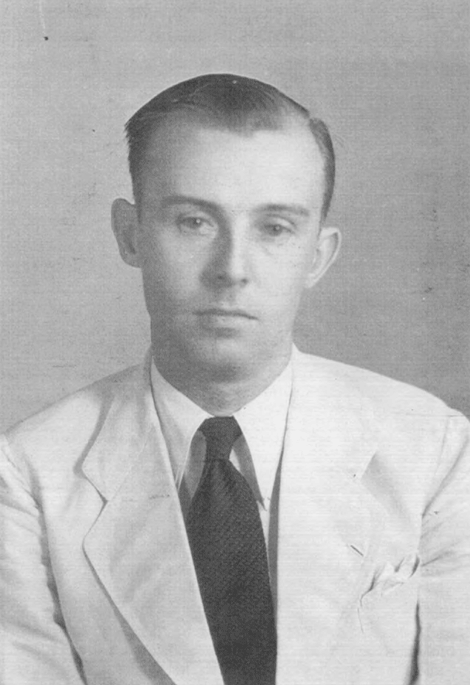
- Nieuwenhuijs, c. 1940
- Born: Robert Nieuwenhuijs; 30 June 1908; Semarang, Dutch East Indies
- Died: 8 November 1999 (aged 91); Amsterdam, Netherlands
- Occupations: Writer, author, journalist, historian

Robert Nieuwenhuys (30 June 1908 – 8 November 1999) was a Dutch writer of Indo descent. The son of a 'Totok' Dutchman and an Indo-European mother, he and his younger brother Roelof, grew up in Batavia, where his father was the managing director of the renowned Hotel des Indes.

His Indies childhood profoundly influenced his life and work. His Javanese nanny 'nènèk' (English: grandma) Tidjah and particularly his Eurasian mother created the benchmarks of his childhood environment. In his award winning book Oost-Indische spiegel, he states: "If I write about my childhood, I write about her world." and "My Indies youth was critical to my receptiveness to particular cultural patterns. It ingrained a relationship with Indonesia that is irreplaceable."

Nieuwenhuys is the Nestor of Dutch Indies literature.

== Life ==
Nieuwenhuys was born in Semarang, Dutch East Indies. In 1927 he (and his brother) moved to the Netherlands and enrolled in the University of Leiden, but he abhorred academic life and never completed his study at the Faculty of Arts. He did however become acquainted with Indonesian nationalists studying in the Netherlands and adopted anti-colonial convictions.

In 1935 he returned to the Dutch East Indies and befriended his mentor, the iconic Indo writer E. du Perron. Perron influenced him to study the literary work of P.A. Daum and upcoming writer Beb Vuyk. He joined anti-colonial magazines as a writer, researcher and critic.

In 1941 he was a conscript medic in the KNIL and from 1942 to 1945 a Japanese POW. In the Japanese concentration camp Tjimahi he was part of a small group of intellectuals, including Leo Vroman and the iconic Tjalie Robinson, that for a while was able to print a camp periodical named 'Kampkroniek' (Camp Chronicles) and a pamphlet named 'Onschendbaar Domein' (Inviolable Domain).

From 1945–1947 he stayed in the Netherlands to recuperate from the war and evaded the violence of the Bersiap period.

In 1947 he returned to his land of birth during the continuing Indonesian revolution and set up a cultural and literary magazine in an attempt to mitigate the Dutch-Indonesian alienation via art and literature. Although Indonesian intellectuals and artists were receptive to this unique forum political developments and strong anti-Dutch sentiments surpassed all good intentions. In 1952, 4 years into Indonesian independence, Nieuwenhuys repatriated to the Netherlands.

In the Netherlands Nieuwenhuys became a teacher and pursued a literary career. He became a highly influential literary scholar and author and won numerous awards throughout his career, among them the 1983 Constantijn Huygens Prize. He died in Amsterdam.

Nieuwenhuys' magnum opus is the authoritative literary classic Mirror of the Indies: A History of Dutch Colonial Literature (Original Dutch: Oost-Indische spiegel), the main reference book regarding Dutch Indies literature.

== Prizes ==
- 1959 – 'Essay prize Amsterdam' for De zaak Lebak na honderd jaar
- 1973 – 'Special prize Jan Campert foundation' 4 Oost-Indische spiegel
- 1975 – 'Dr. Wijnaendts Francken prize' for Oost-Indische spiegel
- 1983 – 'Constantijn Huygens prize' for complete wok
- 1984 – #honorary doctorate of Leiden University

== Publications ==
- 1932 – Een vergeten romantikus
- 1954 – Vergeelde portretten uit een Indisch familiealbum
- 1959 – Tussen twee vaderlanden
- 1961 – Tempo Doeloe, fotografische documenten uit het oude Indië, 1870–1914 (Alias: E. Breton de Nijs)
- 1962 – De pen in gal gedoopt; een keuze uit brieven en documenten van Herman Neubronner van der Tuuk.
- 1964 – De dominee en zijn worgengel, van en over François Haverschmidt
- 1966 – De onuitputtelijke natuur
- 1972 – Oost-Indische spiegel

'Mirror of the Indies: A History of Dutch Colonial Literature' translated from Dutch by E. M. Beekman (Publisher: Periplus, 1999) Book review.

- 1976 – Batavia, koningin van het Oosten
- 1979 – Een beetje oorlog
- 1981 – Baren en oudgasten, dl. I, fotografische documenten uit het oude Indië, 1870–1920
- 1982 – Komen en blijven
- 1987 – De mythe van Lebak (ISBN 9028206620)
- 1988 – Met vreemde ogen
- 1990 – Oost-Indisch magazijn. De geschiedenis van de Indisch-Nederlandse letterkunde
- 1995 – De bevrijding in de Oost
- 1998 – Baren en oudgasten: Tempo doeloe, een verzonken wereld (ISBN 9021476878)
- 1998 – Komen en blijven: Tempo doeloe, een verzonken wereld (ISBN 9021476886)
- 1998 – Met vreemde ogen: Tempo doeloe, een verzonken wereld (ISBN 9021476894)

== See also ==
=== Other Indo authors ===
- Louis Couperus (1863–1923)
- Victor Ido (1869–1948)
- Ernest Douwes Dekker (1879–1950)
- Maria Dermoût (1888–1962)
- Edgar du Perron (1899–1940)
- Beb Vuyk (1905–1991)
- Tjalie Robinson (1911–1974)
- Ernst Jansz (1948– )
- Marion Bloem (1952– )
