= Ernest Douwes Dekker =

Indonesia politician (1879–1950)

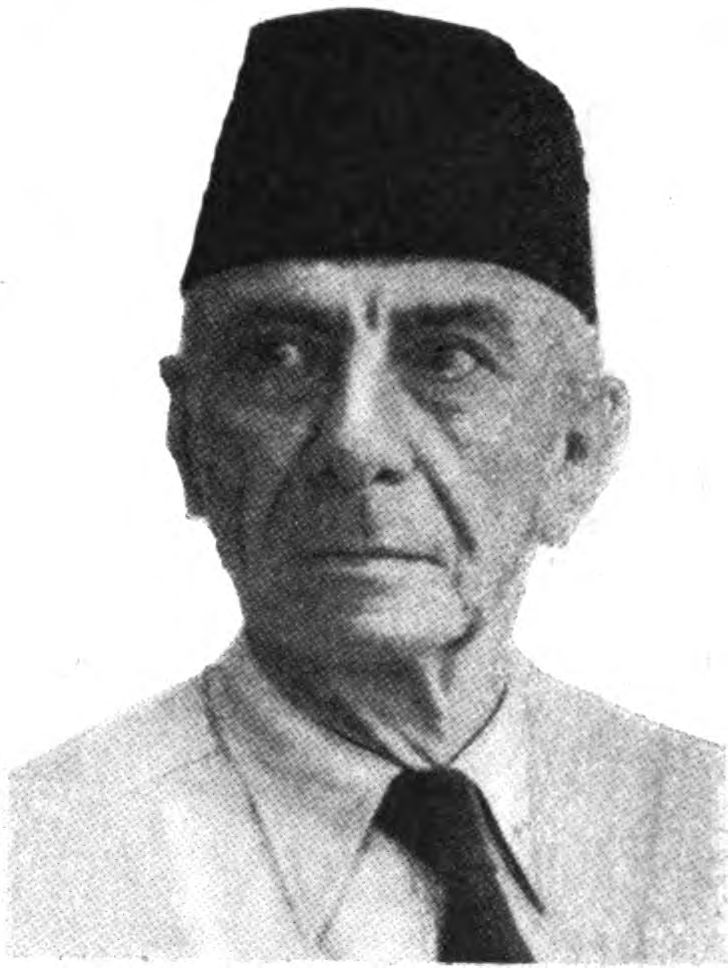
- Portrait, c. 1940s
- Born: Ernest François Eugène Douwes Dekker; October 8, 1879; Pasoeroean, Residency of Malang, Dutch East Indies (now Pasuruan, Indonesia)
- Died: August 28, 1950 (aged 70); Bandung, West Java, Indonesia
- Other name: Danudirja Setiabudi
- Occupations: Politician; Writer
- Spouse(s): Clara Charlotte Deije; Johanna Petronella Mossel; Haroemi Wanasita (Nelly Kruymel)

Ernest François Eugène Douwes Dekker (8 October 1879 – 28 August 1950), also known as Danudirja Setiabudi after Indonesian independence, was an Indonesian-Dutch nationalist and politician of Indo descent. He was related to the famous Dutch anti-colonialism writer Eduard Douwes Dekker. In his youth, he fought in the Second Boer War in South Africa on the Boer side. His thoughts were highly influential in the early years of the Indonesian freedom movement.

== Early years ==
Douwes Dekker was born in Pasuruan, in the north east of Java, 50 miles (80 km) south of Surabaya. His father was Auguste Henri Edouard Douwes Dekker, a broker and bank agent, of a Dutch family living in the then-Dutch East Indies. His Indo (Eurasian) mother was Louisa Margaretha Neumann, of half-German and half-Javanese descent. Douwes Dekker's great-uncle was the famous writer Eduard Douwes Dekker, author of Max Havelaar.

After studying in Lower School in Pasuruan, he moved to Surabaya, and later to Batavia. In 1897, he gained his diploma and worked on a coffee plantation in Malang, East Java. Later he moved to a sugar plantation in Kraksaan, East Java. During his years in these plantations, he came in contact with ordinary Javanese and saw the realities of their hard work.

== Second Boer War ==
In 1900, along with his brothers Julius and Guido, he decided to volunteer for service in the Second Boer War. They arrived in Transvaal, and became citizens of that state. He based his actions on the belief that the Boers were victims of British expansionism, and as a fellow descendant of the Dutch, he was obliged to help, although upon arrival, he became disillusioned with the Boer cause by seeing how poorly the Boers treated the native Africans there. In the course of the war, he was captured by the British and placed in an internment camp on Ceylon. Dekker was later released and returned to the Dutch East Indies via Paris in 1903.

== Indonesian struggle ==
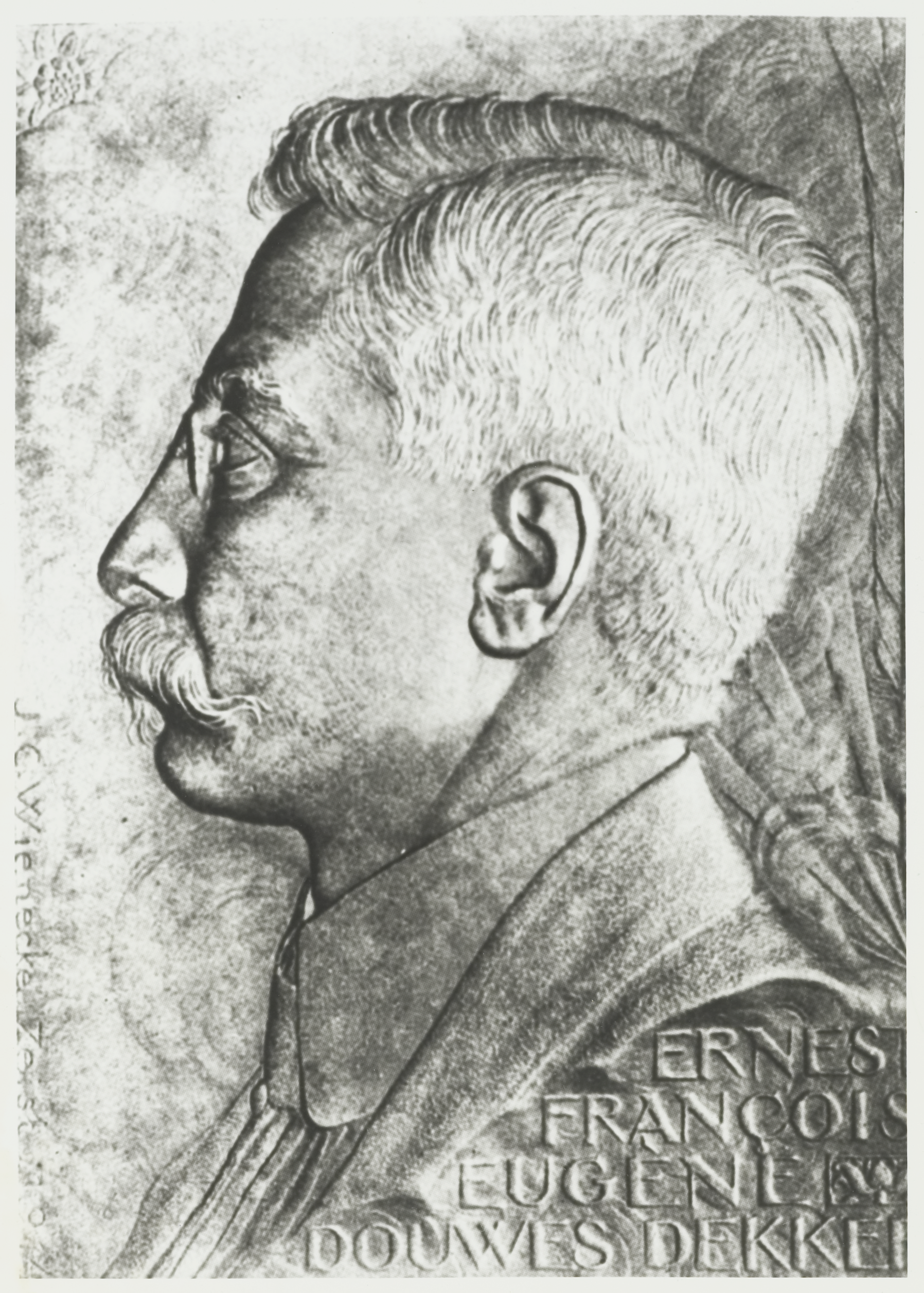
Plaque made by JC Wienecke in Bandung with an image of Ernest François Eugène Douwes Dekker, cousin of Multatuli, pseudonym of Eduard Douwes Dekker.

In the Dutch East Indies, Dekker, then still in his twenties, started a career as a journalist, first in Semarang and later in Batavia. There he worked with Indo activist Karel Zaalberg, the chief editor of the newspaper Bataviaasch Nieuwsblad, whom he befriended. On 5 May 1903, he married Clara Charlotte Deije, who would bear him three children. Unlike other people of European descent, he did not favour colonialism, strongly advocating self-management, and finally the independence, of the Dutch East Indies.

During these times, he published many articles advocating independence, and "Indies nationalism." He established contact with Indian anti-colonial radicals like Shyamji Krishna Varma and Har Dayal, whose work was published in Dekker's publication Het Tijdschrift. He sympathised with syndicalism and Dekker was widely considered to be an anarchist himself during this time and was the first Indonesian to be known as such.

In 1913, close associates of Douwes Dekker, including physicians Tjipto Mangunkusumo and Suwardi Surjaningrat, established the Native Committee in Bandung, which later became the Indische Partij. The Colonial government quickly became worried, and the party was forbidden. This led to the exile to the Netherlands of Douwes Dekker and his two Javanese associates.

In exile, they worked with liberal Dutchmen and compatriot students. It is believed that the term Indonesia was first used in the name of an organization, the Indonesian Alliance of Students, with which they were associated during the early 1920s. After his party was forbidden it directly inspired the foundation of the Insulinde and an Indo-European party named 'Indo Europeesch Verbond' chaired by his friend Karel Zaalberg and also advocated independence. Many of the former 'Indische Partij' members joined the new party that grew to 10.000 members.

In 1918 he was allowed to return to the East Indies and was responsible for reforming the 'Insulinde' into the new 'National Indische Party' (NIP). Together with his new associate P.F. Dahler and old companion Tjipto Mangoenkoesoemo, he became a prominent leader of the NIP. After the NIP was involved in the Surakarta farmers' strike, he was imprisoned again by the colonial authorities in 1921.

After his release from prison in 1922, he taught in Bandung in a lower school. Two years later, as head of the school, he renamed it the "Ksatrian Institute." The government officially recognised this institute in 1926. In the same year, he married Johanna Mussel, one of its teachers, six years after divorcing his first wife. Sukarno was a teacher at one of his schools.

Later, however, his activities were branded illegal, and in 1936 he was condemned to three months in prison. He was still actively advocating independence and sharing his thoughts with other intellectuals, among them Sukarno, who considered Douwes Dekker as his teacher. Later, however, his influence was overshadowed by the politics of his student Sukarno's Indonesian National Party (PNI), Islamist Sarekat Islam, and Communist Party of Indonesia.

During World War II, Dutch authorities, who considered him a dangerous activist, exiled him, along with many Indo-European of German descent, to Suriname. He would spend years in a forest prison camp called Jodensavanne internment camp. Dekker returned to Indonesia on 2 January 1947.

== Later years ==
After he returned to Indonesia, he was appointed a member of the provisional parliament, or Komite Nasional Indonesia Pusat (Indonesian National Central Committee). In February 1947, he changed his name to Danudirja Setiabudi which means 'powerful substance, faithful spirit.' In 1947 he divorced his second wife and married the Indo European author Nelly Alberta Kruymel, who had changed her name to Harumi Wanasita, in an Islamic ceremony.

In December 1948 he was lifted from his sickbed and arrested by Dutch troops, but released due to his poor health.

He spent his last years in Bandung, writing his autobiography, 70 Jaar Konsekwent. On his seventieth birthday to his delight, he witnessed the formal Dutch transfer of sovereignty to Indonesia in 1949. He died eight months later in 1950.

== Legacy ==
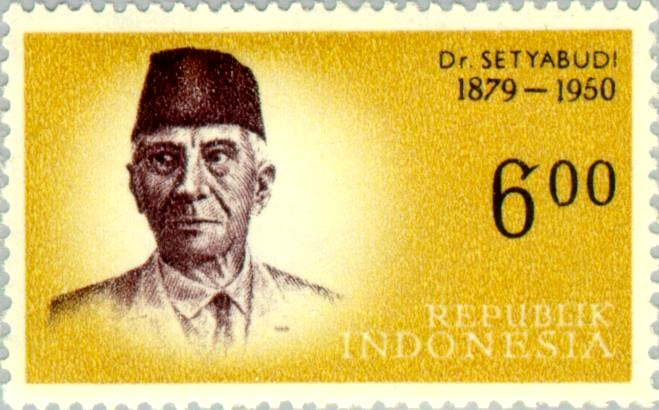
1962 Indonesian stamp in the series "National Heroes" featuring Dekker

In Dutch literature, he is portrayed as a tragic and misunderstood historical figure.

However, his legacy as a national hero is still appreciated in Indonesia. A district and a main street in Jakarta are named Setiabudi in his honour, as well as Setiabudi Integritas station of Transjakarta Corridor 6, Setiabudi Astra station of Jakarta MRT, and Setiabudi station of Jabodebek LRT serving the district.

His life is recorded in a biography, Het Leven van EFE Douwes Dekker, by Frans Glissenaar in 1999.

== See also ==
=== Other Indonesian authors ===
- Louis Couperus (1863–1923)
- Victor Ido (1869–1948)
- Maria Dermoût (1888–1962)
- Edgar du Perron (1899–1940)
- Beb Vuyk (1905–1991)
- Rob Nieuwenhuys (1908–1999)
- Tjalie Robinson (1911–1974)
- Ernst Jansz (1948– )
- Marion Bloem (1952– )
