= Petjo =

Dutch creole in Indonesia

- Native to: Indonesia, Netherlands
- Ethnicity: Indo; Dutch
- Native speakers: "some" (2007)
- Language family: Dutch-based creole: Petjo

Language codes
- ISO 639-3: pey
- Glottolog: petj1238
- ELP: Petjo

Petjo, also known as Petjoh, Petjok, Pecok and Petjoek (Javanese: ꦥꦼꦕꦺꦴꦏ꧀, romanized: pecok, lit. 'to cut'), is a Dutch-based creole language that originated among the Indos, a people of mixed Dutch and Indonesian ancestry in the former Dutch East Indies. The language has influences from Dutch and, depending on the region, Javanese, Malay, Sundanese and Betawi. It was primarily spoken in Kemajoran, Karangbidara, and Krambangan which had significant Indos population. Its speakers presently live mostly in Indonesia and the Netherlands. The language is expected to become gradually extinct by the end of the 21st century, due to Indos' shift toward Indonesian in Indonesia and Dutch in the Netherlands.

== Background ==
Just as the Indo (Eurasian) community historically originated from relationships between European males and Indonesian females, its language reflects this same origin. Typified as a mixed-marriage language, the grammar of Petjok is based on the maternal Malay language and the lexicon on the paternal Dutch language.

The main contact mechanisms responsible for the creation of Petjok are lexical re-orientation; selective replication and convergence. The original speakers of the language do not necessarily want to maintain their first language, but rather create a second one. These creative speakers of the language were probably bilingual, but more fluent in the dominant lingua franca i.e., native Malay language, than Dutch language.

In its overall split between grammar and lexicon, the structure of Petjok is very similar to the Media Lengua spoken in Ecuador by the Quechua people, with the critical difference that the much older language, Pecok, has undergone late system morphemes and syntactic blends.

The most important author that published literary work in this language is the Indo (Eurasian) writer Tjalie Robinson.

Dialect continuum in Indonesian-Dutch language contact
| Grammatical features | Dutch | Indies Dutch | Pecok | Malay |
|---|---|---|---|---|
| Dutch | | | | |
| Verb Second | + | | | |
| Inversion | + | | | |
| Copula | + | | | |
| Dutch inflection | + | + | | |
| Dutch lexicon | + | + | + | |
| Emphatic PRO | | + | | |
| Malay/Indonesian | | | | |
| Malay morphology | | | + | + |
| Topic-deletion | | | + | + |
| Malay particles | | | + | + |

Largely an oral language, there is no standard spelling for it. Texts may be written using what is known as the old spelling (Ejaan Tempo Dulu) or the Indonesian Enhanced Spelling (Ejaan Yang Disempurnakan).

Spelling for Petjo
| | Old Spelling | | Indonesian Enhanced Spelling | |
|---|---|---|---|---|
| | Ejaan Tempo Dulu | | Ejaan Yang Disempurnakan | |
| Basis | (Dutch) Malay Spelling | | Indonesian Enhanced Spelling | |
| | dj | | j | |
| | oe | | u | |
| | j | | y | |
| | tj | | c | |
| | nj | njang | ny | nyang |
| | sj | | sy | |
| | ch | | kh | |

Each urban area with a large Indo community had their own variation of Petjok. For example: the Petjok of Batavia was influenced by a form of Malay which contained many Chinese words, in Bandung, many Sundanese words were used, while in Semarang and Surabaya many Javanese words were in use. Petjo should not be confused with Javindo, a different creole language spoken by Indos in the Dutch East Indies. With the loss of the generation that lived in the Dutch East Indies era, that language has almost died out, but it become identity for Indo descent. In contrast, the colonial society saw the creole languages as a corrupted Dutch which should be corrected as quickly as possible.

Comparison between Javindo and Petjo
| | Javindo | Petjo |
|---|---|---|
| Actor vs non-actor | strong preference for non-actor-oriented sentences | |
| Lexifier language | Dutch | |
| Origin of the Speakers | Semarang | Batavia |
| Substrate language | Javanese | Batavian Malay |
| Speaker as actor indicator | taq, tak, ta` | ku- |
| Hearer as actor | koq | kau- / absent |
| Affixation by suffix | | lack of |

== Phonology ==
Petjo's phonology is based on the Malay phonology. This means that both words in Malay and in Dutch sound sequences in syllables are lengthened, consonants and vowels are likely to overlap each other (CVCV); some consonants that follow each other (consonant clusters) are most likely to be avoided. The following will give an example of an 'e' which is spoken unstressed (schwa insertion) or the consonant is omitted.

| English | Dutch | Petjo | Indonesian | |
| English | Dutch | Petjo | Cognate | Synonyms |
|---|---|---|---|---|
| headquarters | hoofdbureau | obiro | hopbiro | kantor pusat, markas |
| arrest | arresteren | asseret | arès | menahan |
| syrup | stroop | seterop | setrup | sirup |

=== Consonants ===
==== Consonant shifts ====
The suprasegmental aspects – word stress and intonation – in Petjo are very similar to Malay; Petjo has a striking zinsmelodie (rhythm) compared to Dutch. In addition, Petjo has a different consonant pronunciation compared to Dutch. Below is a shift in the pronunciation of voiced consonants to voiceless in Petjo.

| Dutch | Petjo | Examples |
|---|---|---|
| z | s | zeg [seg] (say); zwart [swart] (black) |
| v | f | vreemd [freem] (foreign); over [ofer] (about) |
| v/f | p | verlop [perlop] (expire) |
| h | g/ch | huis [chuis] (house); hem [chem] (him) |
| g/ch | h | tegen [tehen] (against); vergeten [verheten] (to forget) |
| j | ie-j | ja [ijo] (yes) |

==== Consonant blends ====
The combination of consonants also for many Petjo speakers becomes an insurmountable problem. Petjo speakers will usually omit some sounds or add others in between to get a slightly flexible tongue to pronounce a combination of consonants.

| Dutch | Petjo | Examples |
|---|---|---|
| schr | sr | schrik [srik] (fright) |
| nk | ng | denk [deng] (think) |
| e (schwa) | - | luisteren [leist’ren] (listen) |
| - | e (schwa) | straks [sêtêraks] (soon) |
| - | d/t | er in [d’rin] (in it); is er [ister] (is there) |
| t | - | vent [fen] (guy); hond [chon] (dog) |

=== Vowels ===
In Petjo's pronunciation, all vowels are pronounced nasally. Long and closed sounds are pronounced open or wide. Long sounds are often pronounced shorter and short sounds made longer compared to Dutch pronunciation:

| Dutch | Petjo | Examples |
|---|---|---|
| a | aa | man [maan] (man) |
| oo | o | dood [dhó] (dead) |
| uu | ie | natuurlijk [natierlijk] (naturally) |
| u | i | stuk [stik] (piece) |
| e | aa | geweldig [haaweldih] (awesome) |

== Language samples ==
| English | Petjo | Dutch | Indonesian |
|---|---|---|---|
| Where did you get those cigarettes, Ntiet? | Fanwaar rokok-nja, Ntiet? | Waar heb je die sigaretten vandaan, Ntiet? | Dari mana rokoknya, Ntiet? |
| Where are you going Koos? | Jij haat naarwaar Koos? | Waar ga je naar toe Koos? | Kamu mau pergi ke mana, Koos? |
| The clothes that were washed by that woman | Kleren njang di-wassen door die frouw | De kleren die door die vrouw worden gewassen | Pakaian yang dicuci oleh wanita itu |
| See that quid? | Je siet proempie-nja? | Zie je die pruim (pruimtabak)? | Lihat premnya? |
| The water that flows gently | De water, njang stromen sachjes | Het water, dat zachtjes stroomt | Air, yang mengalir perlahan |

=== Fragment from Petjoh van Batavia ===
From Tjalie Robinson, Ik en Bentiet:

I say: "Als so, alleen djoeloeng-djoeloeng jij fang!"

He say: "Itoe diejè!"

I say: "Njang klein-klein fóór wat?"

He say: "Foor kwamaroem".

I say: "Foor wat?"

He say: Foor waramoeki".

I say: So-euven jij seh anders".

He say: "Ha-a. Muuleke woort dese. Laat maar dese woort, alsmaar ding-nja hoet".

I say: "Wat foor ding, dese ding. Lekker?"

He say: "Masa lekker. Als jij denken freten door maar-door jij".
