= Augusta de Wit =

Dutch writer (1864–1939)

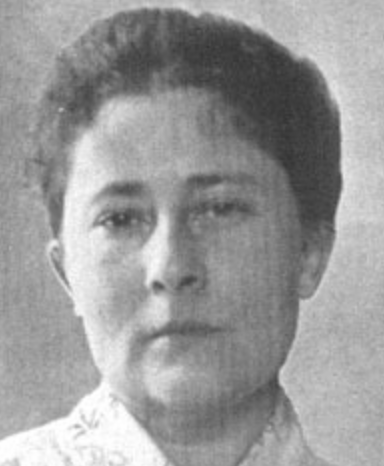
- Augusta de Wit, from her 1898 book, Facts and Fancies about Java
- Born: Anna Augusta Henriette de Wit; 25 November 1864; Siboga, Sumatra, Dutch East Indies
- Died: 9 February 1939 (aged 74); Baarn, Netherlands
- Education: Bedford College; Girton College
- Occupations: Journalist; writer; translator; Educator
- Writing career
- Pen name: George W. Sylvius; G. W. Sylvius; Georges W. Sylvius
- Language: Dutch; English
- Notable work: Orpheus in de dessa (1903)

Augusta Anna Augusta Henriette de Wit (25 November 1864 – 9 February 1939), also known by the pen name George W. Sylvius (Note: Also cited as G. W. Sylvius and Georges W. Sylvius.), was a Dutch journalist, writer, translator, educator and communist. De Wit is best known for her 1903 novel Orpheus in de dessa.

== Early life and education ==
De Wit was born Anna Augusta Henriette de Wit on 25 November 1864 in Siboga, Sumatra (present-day Indonesia) to Jan Karel de Wit (1819–1884), a high-ranking official, and Anna Maria Johanna de la Couture (c. 1837–1895).

The De Wit family later lived in the Tapanuli Residency and the Minangkabau Highlands. Returning to the Netherlands for two years, the family later settled on the island of Timor. In 1874, De Wit and her family returned permanently to the Netherlands, living successively in Helvoirt, Utrecht, and Oosterbeek.

De Wit studied at Bedford College and Girton College from 1888 to 1890.

== Career ==
De Wit first taught at the same girls' school she'd attended in Utrecht. Returning to the Dutch East Indies in 1894, De Wit taught German, English, and history at the Higher Civic School for Girls in Batavia. Using the pseudonym George W. Sylvius, De Wit published Tachtigers-style stories in Eigen Haard and De Gids during 1895 and 1896. These stories were later published in 1899 as Verborgen bronnen under De Wit's name. For health reasons De Wit left teaching in 1896, and began writing English-language travel reports for The Straits Times about her travels in Java. These travels reports were later published in Singapore as the illustrated book Facts and Fancies about Java in 1898.

Further books followed, including the novel Orpheus in de Dessa (1903), Island-India (1923), and De wijdere wereld (1930). She also wrote short stories, and corresponded with D. H. Lawrence about translating his works into Dutch. As literary critic at the Nieuwe Rotterdamsche Courant, de Wit admired the work of Edith Wharton.

== Personal life ==
Augusta de Wit was ill for several years before she died in 1939, aged 74 years, in Baarn. "She ranked among such authors as De Meester, Coenen, and Robbers and was a writer of temperate realism with an Oriental touch," recalled the New York Times in a brief obituary note. In recent years, her work is usually mentioned in the context of women writers and Dutch colonialism.

== Bibliography ==
- De Wit, Augusta (1898). Facts and fancies about Java (1 ed.). Singapore: "Strait Times" Press.
- De Wit, Augusta (1899). Verborgen bronnen (in Dutch). Amsterdam: PN van Kampen & Zn.
- De Wit, Augusta (1903). Orpheus in de dessa (in Dutch).
