= Tjalie Robinson =

Dutch Indo writer and activist (1911-1974)

- Born: Jan Johannes Theodorus Boon; January 10, 1911; Nijmegen, Gelderland, Netherlands
- Died: April 22, 1974 (aged 63); The Hague, South Holland, Netherlands
- Occupations: Writer, journalist, activist

Tjalie Robinson is the main alias of the Indo (Eurasian) intellectual and writer Jan Boon (10 January 1911 – 22 April 1974) also known as Vincent Mahieu. His father Cornelis Boon, a Royal Netherlands East Indies Army (KNIL) sergeant, was Dutch and his Indo-European mother Fela Robinson was part Scottish and Javanese.

He is considered to be the author of unique Indo literature. Tjalie Robinson became the most influential post war Indo activist of his generation and the most important promoter of Indo culture anywhere. In his essay "Sweet Java, about Tjalie Robinson." Rudy Kousbroek, one of the Netherlands foremost essayists, simply called him "one of the greatest Dutch writers".

His aim as cultural guardian was to preserve Indo culture for the future or as he put it himself: "To create living monuments for an immortal past.".

In his most vivid description of the Eurasian nature of his Indo identity Tjalie Robinsion wrote:

"I did not care that people wanted to call me ‘neither fish nor fowl,’ and wanted to label me (an Indo), either Indonesian or Dutch. For them I just had to choose between the two, right? Nevertheless, I stubbornly named the turtle as ‘neither fish nor fowl,’ and praised this animal as a unique, land-and-sea-lover who lives to very old ages, whose meat has an excellent taste, and who cuts through oceans from continent to continent. I said, "Just as I do not find the turtle inferior, although he is neither fish nor fowl, I do not think the Indo inferior."

Tjalie Robinson's book 'Tjies' was awarded a literary prize by the municipality of Amsterdam in 1958.

Robinson is the best read Dutch author in Indonesia.

== Life in the Dutch East Indies ==
Born in Nijmegen, the Netherlands, he spent the first 44 years of his life in the Dutch East Indies. When he was a 3-month-old baby his family returned to the Dutch East Indies. As a child he lived and went to primary school in Meester Cornelis (now Jatinegara). He attended secondary school (MULO) in Batavia (now Jakarta). Although an eager and astute student, he was also an avid and all-round athlete and boxer, winning the Silver medal at the high jump and the Gold medal at the pentathlon during the Athletics Championships of Java in 1933. After completing college and obligatory military service he married and went on to become a teacher at the so-called 'Wild (unsubsidised) Schools' on Java and Sumatra. In 1936 he became a contributing editor for the 'Batavian Newspaper' (Dutch: Bataviaasch Nieuwsblad), founded in 1885 by author P.A. Daum. It was one of the leading newspapers in the Dutch East Indies which also employed other important Indo writers like Karel Zaalberg, Ernest Douwes Dekker and Victor Ido.

During World War II (1942–1945) Robinson was interned in various Japanese concentration camps such as Tjimahi and the infamous Changi Prison, where he continued writing. He was part of a small group of intellectuals (including Leo Vroman and Rob Nieuwenhuys) that engaged in cultural activity. For a while Robinson was even able to print a camp periodical named 'Kampkroniek' (Camp Chronicles) and a pamphlet named 'Onschendbaar Domein' (Inviolable Domain). The gruesome war experience influenced his life philosophy; nevertheless Robinson never wrote much about his years as a POW. On occasions he tried to reflect with an uneasy mix of shame and fascination:

"Sometimes I reluctantly look back at that time I am supposed to hate. (60 years and 60 thousand emotions packed into 1 night.) Surrounded by life-threatening situations and you know you're alone against Fate. Fight, Johny Brown, fight. Ulcers, malaria, diphtheria, bullits and landmines. [...] Knowing physical exhaustion, the stench of swamps, the rattling of snakes, anachoic hunting grounds."

After the war he survived the bedlam of the Bersiap period (1945–1946) and even worked as editor in chief for the magazine Wapenbroeders (Brothers in Arms), where he was also the creator of the popular 'Taaie & Neut' cartoon series. In 1946 he was promoted to captain and served as war correspondent for the KNIL's Public Relations Office (Dutch: Leger voorlichtings dienst) in amongst others the volatile region of Kediri, East Java.

After Indonesia gained independence, he remarried in 1950 and moved to Borneo with his new wife, who was working for the Bruynzeel corporation in the timber industry. There he adopted the alias 'Vincent Mahieu' (named after Indo icon Auguste Mahieu (1865–1903), founder of the Komedie Stamboel Indo opera) and wrote much of his work for the books 'Tjies' & 'Tjoek'.

His wife Lillian Ducelle recalled:

... he was home writing. We lived outside of the city along a river. Rats as big as cats ran through our little house. Sometimes we had no water or electricity - but he had the time of his life. In our time there he wrote most of his 'Vincent Mahieu' oeuvre. Typewriter on a wooden case turned over, he just kept on typing. He said: "This is where I live."

Scholar, translator and poet E.M. Beekman describes the work as: "These stories show a refined talent, a powerful imagination, an inquisitive intellect and a whole lot of feeling." Both books were translated into Indonesian in 1976 by H.B. Jassin. The latter book into German in 1993 by W.Hüsmert. The English translations by M. Alibasah were published in 1995.

From 1952 to 1954 he worked as journalist for the newspaper 'Nieuwsgier' where he was continuously reflecting on life in his ever-changing homeland and wrote most of his often re-printed work 'Piekerans van een straatslijper.' 'Piekerans' (Musings) is the Petjok word Tjalie Robinson used to name his weekly essays in the newspaper, which in essence do not significantly differ from the work of his famous Dutch contemporary in the Netherlands Simon Carmiggelt. Together their work grew into a separate genre in Dutch literature and found successors in among others Rudy Kousbroek. He also became contributing editor with the cultural and literary magazine 'Orientatie', which published many of his short stories. In his story writing he excelled as a literary interpreter of everyday life of Indos in the Dutch East Indies.

== Life in the Netherlands ==
In 1955 he left for the Netherlands and first lived in Amsterdam and later in The Hague, where he became a zealous activist for the preservation of Indo culture. Initially he wrote columns reflecting on repatriation in Dutch newspaper Het Parool, where he became a direct colleague of Simon Carmiggelt, and simultaneously kept catering for the Indos still in Indonesia by writing for Surabaya based 'De Vrije Pers' (The Free Press). He originally attempted to find connection with the cultural and literary establishment of the Netherlands, but unwilling to assimilate he wanted to establish his own cultural network of Indo authors and artists. To groom the 62-year-old Indo author Maria Dermoût who successfully debuted in 1955 he wrote her: "I am Mrs Dermoût, a barefoot child of the free seas and free mountains. Even when death would be my prediction, I will keep fighting an injustice that does not threaten me personally, but our cultural conscience (if there is such a thing)."

He soon started a short-lived magazine called Gerilja (Guerrilla), sub-titled 'Magazine for Self-preservation', after which he took over editorial responsibility of the monthly magazine De Brug (The Bridge) in 1957, which he wanted to transform into a weekly Indo magazine. This became the predecessor of his magazine ‘Tong Tong’, sub-titled 'The only Indo magazine in the Netherlands', established one year later (1958) and that lives on to this day under the name ‘Moesson’. The magazine's main target audience was the Indo community in diaspora. At its peak in 1961 the magazine had 11,000 paying subscribers and reached an estimated 77,000 readers, one third of the Indo community in the Netherlands. Another living monument of his achievements is the annual Pasar Malam Besar (renamed to 'Tong Tong Fair' in 2009) which he co-founded in 1959.

In a 1958 example how Tjalie Robinson used the Tong Tong Magazine to elucidate both his own Indo community and Dutch public opinion, his editorial reaction to a government study about the repatriation from Indonesia contradicts the widespread notion Indo culture was merely a thin facade laid over a Dutch foundation. Using the evidence of centuries old Portuguese family names many Indos carried and matriarchal kinship relations within Eurasian communities, he argued that in origin the Indos sprang from an ancient mestizo culture going back all the way to the beginning of the European involvement in Asia.

When in 1960 and 1961 he published his best-known work, respectively the books Tjies and Tjoek, Dutch literary critics immediately praised his style and narrative. However they found it hard to comprehend the Indies environment he was describing. Tjalie Robinson himself consequently decided to give all his focus to the advancement of the Indo community in diaspora and the social objectives he coupled to that, by solely publishing in his own magazine. In 1963 he wrote: "I couldn't care less about literary life, in reality that only means your a name in a bookcase. Writing should have a living social function. 90% of what we call literature is just phraseology, obsequious embellishment and blatherskite."

Tjalie Robinson developed a life philosophy that evolves around the nature of the Hunt, regularly writing about the practice of hunting as a parable for 'real' and 'truthful' living as he saw it. In his stories the Hunt often returns as a theme to intellectually explore 'dangerous' and 'courageous' life and particularly to depict the life and culture of Indos. In the Netherlands he emerged as a sharp critic of assimilation, putting the hunting lifestyle of the Indo opposite to mundane lifestyle in the West.

Tjalie Robinson has been attributed to having single-handedly preserved the historic hybrid Indo culture of the Dutch East Indies in literature.

... with the wisdom of hindsight we now know that Tjalie Robinson was one of the most original writers of post war Dutch literature, that in the nick of time he secured something that otherwise would have been lost to us: how people felt, thought and spoke in the now lost world of the Indo community on Java. Rudy Kousbroek, 1989.

== Later years ==
In search of a global vision on Indo culture and in a continued effort to resist assimilation Tjalie Robinson traveled to Latin America, where he compared the Indo community with the racially mixed people of that continent. Already in the Dutch East Indies he had admired the status of the Creole language Papiamento and the cultural expressions of the Dutch Antilles. He also sympathised with the philosophical writings of the Spanish essayist Jose Ortega y Gasset, an outspoken proponent of perspectivism and in 1961 even initiated the creation of an Indo enclave in Spain, named 'El Atabal'.

Later he moved to the United States (1963–1968) and lived in Whittier, California, where he founded 'The American Tong Tong’. He felt there was less resistance in the USA to ethnic profiling of minorities and to create a cultural sanctuary for Indos he set up the Indo Community Center 'De Soos' in Victorville, near Los Angeles, which only allowed membership to people that were also subscribed to the 'American Tong Tong' magazine.

Already before his emigration to the USA he was full of admiration for multi-cultural New York City and wrote: "All these different ethnic minorities (in New York City) are allowed to be who they are (only in Holland we still believe in the folly of assimilation) and – strange as it may sound – they are all American. And now look at how richly they affect New York. All these people that can remain true to themselves, give their own flair and character to American life."

His literary work found comparisons with Flannery O'Connor, writer of Mystery and Manners. Occasional Prose. (as well as other Southern United States authors like Faulkner and Eudora Welty), who appropriately wrote that "great talent can put a small local history into a universal light". In his analysis of Tjalie Robinson professor E.M. Beekman also pointed out that he quite often cited or referred to American authors like: Mark Twain, Henry Miller, Tennessee Williams, T. S. Eliot and even Robert Frost when he was still an unknown writer in Europe.

To save the Dutch 'Tong Tong' magazine that was suffering from a dwindling number of subscribers he returned to the Netherlands in 1968, where he spent the final years of his life. Tjalie Robinson died in 1974. The necrology of this "avant garde visionary" reads: "In The Hague at the age of 63 Indo journalist and author Tjalie Robinson passed away. After his return from Indonesia he had wholeheartedly given his all to preserve the unique identity of the Indo community in the Netherlands. [...] Many of his endeavours encountered resistance, but appreciation was paramount."

His ashes were scattered in the Java Sea at Sunda Kelapa in Jakarta the same year. His son recalls: "Then – under the soft sounds of Kroncong music – the urn was slowly emptied into the sea. Tjalie was home."

== Legacy ==
Part of his literary legacy is the fact that he wrote much of his work in the Indo mix language called Petjok, also known as petjo or pecuk, giving it a status that it never had in the Dutch East Indies and providing academic linguistic research a substantial database. His work varies between the melancholy reminiscence of the Indos in diaspora, caught in the term Tempo Doeloe, the positioning of post-colonial Indo identity and the study of a global Eurasian cultural domain.

... an outstanding figure who helped shape and pass on the legacy of the Dutch colonial past from the East Indies, Tjalie Robinson. An author who not only was a prominent voice in the colonial period, but also throughout the years of decolonisation, and during the ensuing postcolonial era. In his life and work can be detected a reflection of twentieth-century processes of change in the relations between the Netherlands and its former colony in the East. (Professor Dr. Wim Willems describing Tjali Robinson as a cultural mediator from the East.)

His greatest achievement as described by Kousbroek may have been that he was: "... the only one that has restored their (Indo) self respect and granted us insight into their culture and has written about it with the hand of a master."

His work is still regularly re-issued by publisher Moesson, The Hague. and often cited in academic studies.

In 1992 on the facade of Tjalie Robinson's place of birth, Dominicanenstraat 117 in Nijmegen, a memorial was unveiled by the 'Literary Cafe Nijmegen', in collaboration with the Municipality of Nijmegen and the 'Cultural Council Gelderland'.

In 2008 it was announced that a square would be named after him in The Hague.

In 2008 Wim Willems published his biography: Tjalie Robinson, Indo writer and in 2009 his compiled letters Writing with your fists, Tjalie Robinsons letters for which the author received the literary award 'Witte Prijs' in 2010.

In 2009 commemorating Tjalie Robinson's death 35 years ago a modern multi-media theater play based on his stories was performed in Bandung and Jakarta, Indonesia. The play was also performed during the 2011 Tong Tong Fair in The Hague, Netherlands.

The 'Tong Tong' magazine, renamed to 'Moesson' in 1978 lives on to this day with his widow Lillian Ducelle as director and chief editor up to 1993. Lillian Ducelle: "I can not replace my husband, but I can continue his work." 50 seasons of published editions of both the Dutch and American magazine are available online in the digital archive of the official website.

The 'American Tong Tong' magazine, renamed 'The Indo' lives on to this day with Rene Creutzburg as editor and publisher, who in 2007 was awarded a Royal ribbon in the 'Order of Orange-Nassau' for his efforts over the past 44 years. This Dutch and English language magazine is still an official body of the Indo Community Center 'De Soos', established by Tjalie Robinson in 1963.

His Tong Tong Fair remains an annual event in The Hague and many Pasar Malam events inspired by it are held throughout the Netherlands yearly.

== Family ==
He married Edith de Bruijn in 1934. After her death in 1938 he married Ivonne Benice Christine Niggebrugge in 1940. After their divorce in 1949 he married Lilly Mary Hermine van Zele, also known under alias Lillian Ducelle, in 1950. He has 1 son and 2 daughters from his first marriage, 1 son and 1 daughter from his second marriage and 1 son and 1 daughter from his third marriage. Many of his family (wife, children, grandchildren) were actively involved in running both his magazine and festival.

== Publications (selection) ==
- 1960 Tjies (Alias Vincent Mahieu) First edition 1955. Second edition 1958.
- 1961 Tjoek (Alias Vincent Mahieu)
- 1965 Piekerans van een straatslijper (Alias Tjalie Robinson) Compiled work from amongst others his Dutch East Indies 'Nieuwsgier' newspaper columns.
- 1974 Piekeren in Nederland (Alias Tjalie Robinson) Compiled work from amongst others his Dutch 'Het Parool' newspaper columns.
- 1974 Piekerans bij een voorplaat (ed. L. Ducelle)
- 1979 'Memory and agony: Dutch stories from Indonesia (collected and introduced by Rob Nieuwenhuys, translated to English by Adrienne Dixon)
- 1984 Ik en Bentiet (Alias Tjalie Robinson) Humorous dialogues containing much Petjo language in the narrative context.
- 1989 Schuilen voor de regen (Alias Vincent Mahieu)
- 1990 Schat, schot, schat (Alias Vincent Mahieu)
- 1992 Verzameld werk (Alias Vincent Mahieu)
- 1992 Didi in Holland (Alias Didi) Essays written under alias Didi from his column in newspaper Het Parool.
- 1993 The Hunt for the Heart: Selected Tales from the Dutch East Indies (Alias Vincent Mahieu) Work translated to English by Margaret M. Alibasah.
- 2009 Schrijven met je vuisten; brieven van Tjalie Robinson By Willems, Wim (Publisher: Prometheus, 2009) ISBN 978-90-446-1197-7

== See also ==
- Tong Tong Fair
- Indos in colonial history

=== Other Indo authors ===
- Victor Ido (1869–1948)
- Ernest Douwes Dekker (1879–1950)
- Maria Dermoût (1888–1962)
- Beb Vuyk (1905–1991)
- Rob Nieuwenhuys (1908–1999)
- Ernst Jansz (born 1948)
- Alfred Birney (born 1951)
- Marion Bloem (born 1952)
- Theodor Holman (born 1953)
