= Helga Ruebsamen =

Dutch writer (1934–2016)

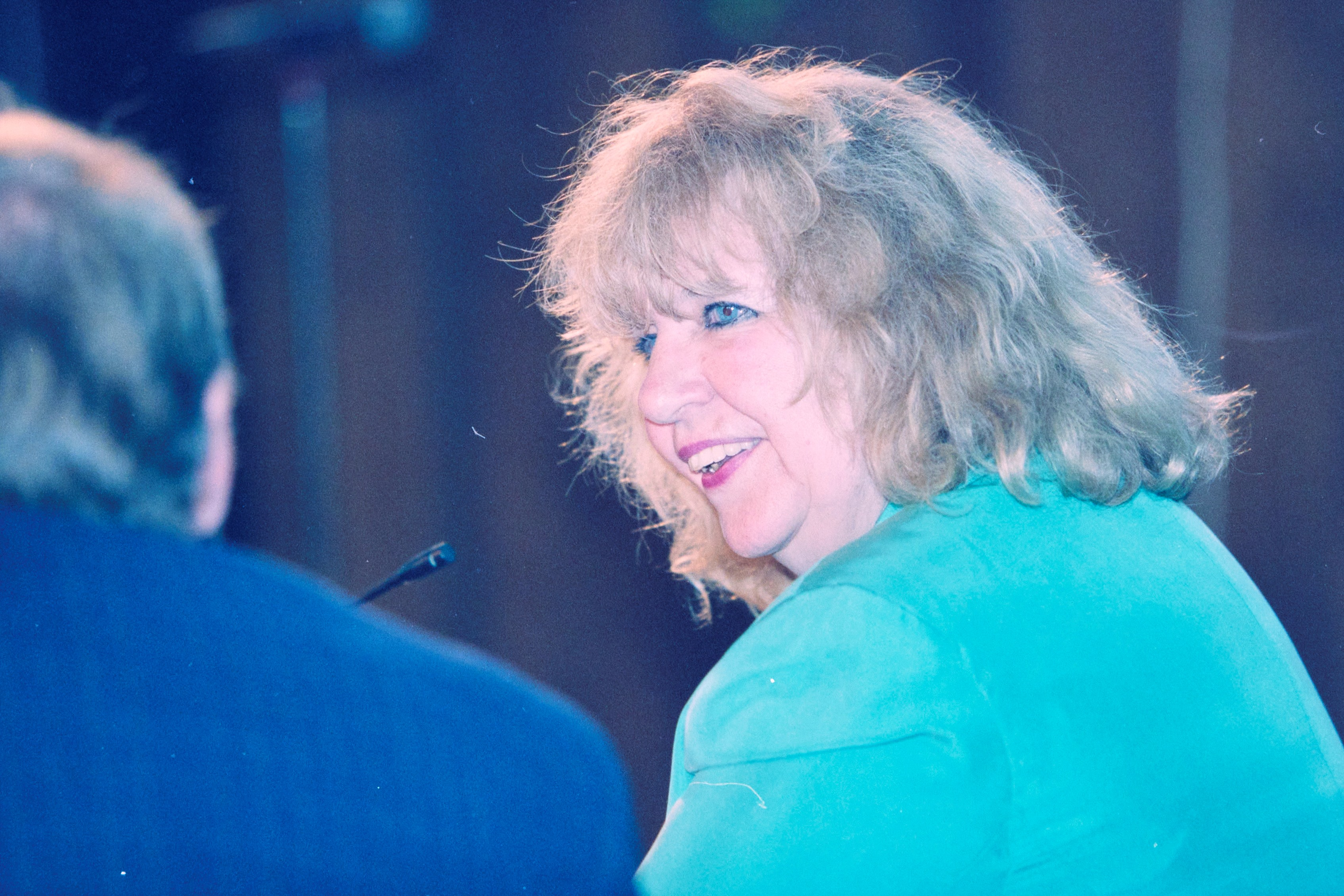
- Ruebsamen (1999)
- Born: Helga Margot Erika Ruebsamen; 4 September 1934; Batavia, Dutch East Indies
- Died: 8 November 2016 (aged 82); The Hague, Netherlands
- Occupation: Writer
- Writing career
- Notable work: Op Scheveningen (1988)

Helga Ruebsamen (4 September 1934 – 8 November 2016) was a Dutch writer. She received the Ferdinand Bordewijk Prijs in 1998 for Het lied en de waarheid.

== Works ==
- De kameleon (1964)
- De heksenvriend (1966)
- Wonderolie (1970)
- De ondergang van Makarov (1971)
- Op Scheveningen (1988)
- Pasdame (1988)
- Olijfje en andere verhalen (1989)
- De dansende kater (1992)
- Alleen met Internet (1996, with Rogi Wieg)
- Het lied en de waarheid (1997)
- Beer is terug (1999)
- De bevrijding (1999)
- Jonge liefde en oud zeer : de verhalen (wolume 1, 2001)
- Jonge liefde en oud zeer : de verhalen (volume 2, 2001)
- Zoet en zondig : de mooiste verhalen uit Indonesië (2003)
