= Ernst Jansz =

Dutch writer and musician (born 1948)

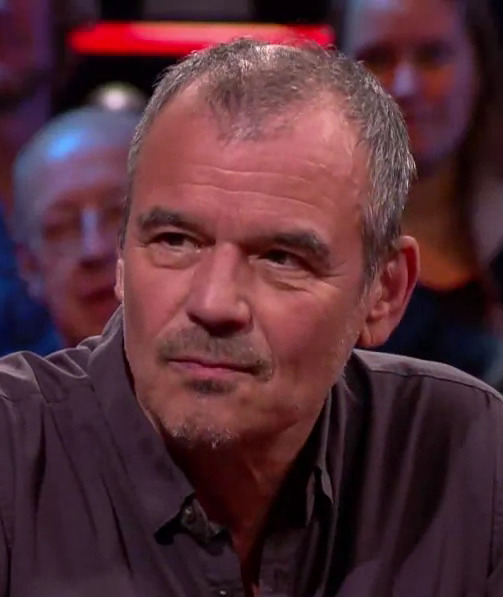
- Ernst Jansz on talk show De Wereld Draait Door in 2017
- Born: Ernst Gideon Jansz; 24 May 1948 (age 78); Amsterdam, Netherlands
- Occupations: Author, musician, Singer, Producer
- Partner: Jaloe Maat (1997–present)
- Children: 3

Ernst Gideon Jansz (born 24 May 1948 in Amsterdam) is one of the founding members and frontmen of Doe Maar. Doe Maar is a Dutch 1980s ska/reggae band, and is considered one of the most successful bands in Dutch pop history.

His father, born in Semarang on Java, is an Indo (Dutch-Indonesian), who went to the Netherlands in 1932 after finishing his study at the Batavia HBS to continue his higher education there. Once Nazi Germany invaded the Netherlands, his father was involved in the Dutch resistance movement, until he was captured and interned in a German concentration camp. After the war he became one of the few Indo advocates for an independent Indonesia. In his view the principle of liberty and independence applied to both situations: Dutch independence from Nazi Germany and Indonesian independence from the colonial Netherlands.

Much of the literary work of the author Jansz is based on his Indo identity and his fathers' heritage.

In 1997 Jansz married actress Jaloe Maat, the mother of his two youngest children. He has a (step)daughter from a previous marriage. He lives with his family in Neerkant, the Netherlands.

He is a well-known celebrity who was openly critical of Covid policies.

== Music ==
Together with Henny Vrienten, Jansz wrote the majority of the Doe Maar-songs and alternated as lead vocalists. He was originally asked to be the band's keyboardist, and played synthesizer on many songs. His Indo background has influenced much of his work (for Doe Maar), particularly "Rumah Saya" (My House or My Home), which he wrote and recorded in 1980 for Skunk, one of the best-sold albums in Dutch pop history. In the song he describes that he fits in with neither Dutch nor Indonesian culture fully.

No mountains at the horizon, in this land of my birth. [...] And then I long for the land of my father. But also there I will be a stranger. [...] Rumah saya dimana? (Wheres my home?) Song lyrics by Ernst Jansz, 1981.

Doe Maar broke into superstardom in 1982, making both Jansz and Vrienten the perfect pop-idols in their mid-thirties. Overexposure caused them to break up two years later. Ernst Jansz returned to folk band CCC Inc and did other projects as a sideman and a solo-artist. In 1995 he rejoined singer-/songwriter Boudewijn de Groot's backing band.

In 2000 Doe Maar released one last album and continued to play occasional reunion-shows.

== Books and albums ==
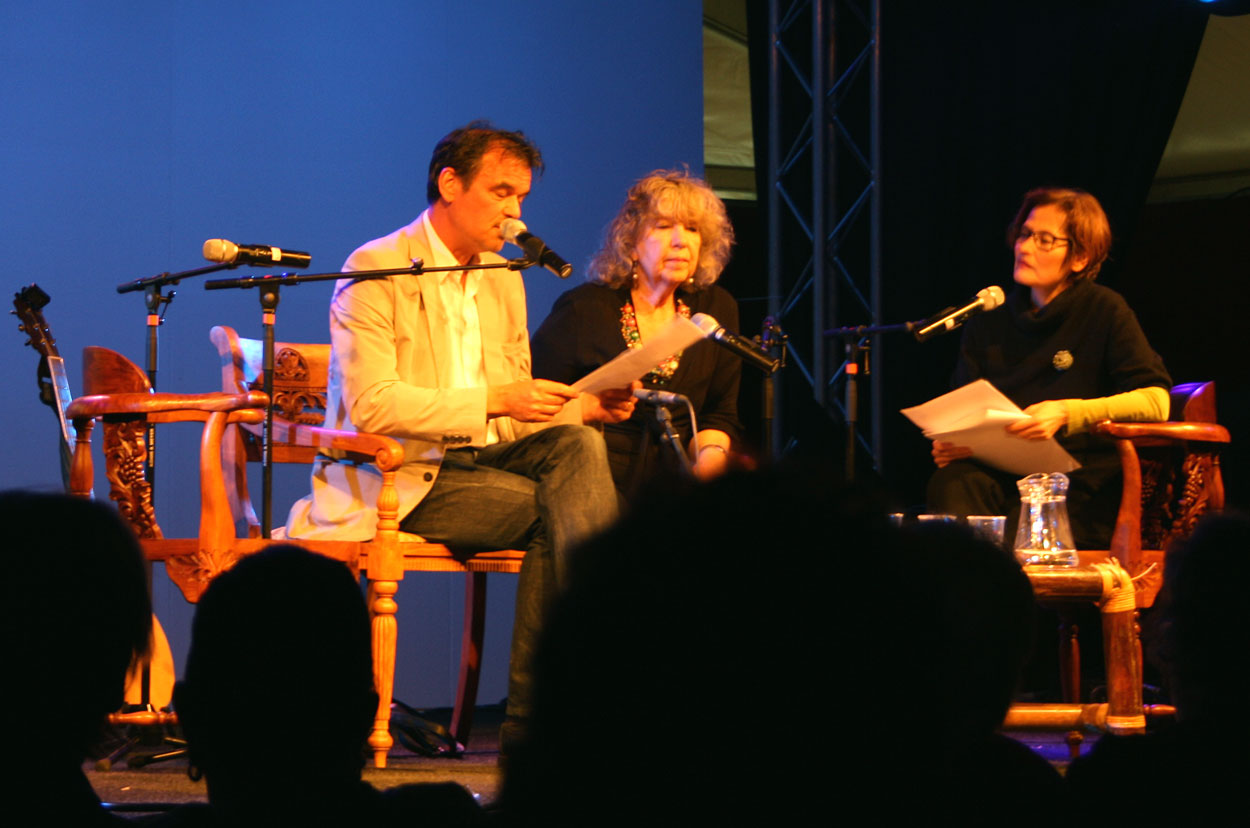
Dutch Indies literature Professor Dr. Pamela Pattynama hosting literary talkshow with guest authors Ernst Jansz and Helga Ruebsamen at the 2011 Tong Tong Fair in the Hague.

Ernst Jansz has written three semi-autobiographical books: Gideons droom (Gideon's Dream, 1983) De Overkant (The Other Side, 1985), and Molenbeekstraat (Een liefdeslied 1948 – 1970) (Molenbeekstraat: a lovesong 1948–1970), 2006). The latter two share their titles with Jansz' solo-albums. Gideons droom is about a second-generation Indo (Indo-European) Dutchman like himself; De Overkant is a three-part book dealing with letters between Jansz and his family (especially his father), the life of his mother, and an account of his trip to Indonesia. Molenbeekstraat covers his early life and mixes in songtext from the Molenbeekstraat album.

== Discography ==
=== Solo albums ===
- 1999 – De Overkant
- 2006 – Molenbeekstraat
- 2010 – Dromen van Johanna - Ernst Jansz sings Bob Dylan, translated
- 2013 – Gideons Droom
- 2017 – De Neerkant
- 2021 – Live In Tijden Van Corona
- 2021 – Chopin en andere stukken
- 2024 – Een liefdeslied

=== CCC inc. ===
- 1970 – To Our Grandchildren
- 1971 – Watching The Evening Sun
- 1973 – Castle in Spain
- 1975 – CCC Forever
- 1984 – Van Beusekom
- 1990 – Speed & Intensity
- 2000 – Jan
- 2007 – 1967–2007 (Box)

=== Slumberlandband ===
- 1975 – Slumberlandband

=== Doe Maar ===
==== Studioalbums ====
- 1979 – Doe Maar
- 1981 – Skunk
- 1982 – Doris Day & Andere Stukken
- 1983 – 4us
- 2000 – Klaar

==== Dub-album ====
- 1982 – Doe de Dub (Dub-version of 'Doris Day')

==== Live-albums ====
- 1983 – Lijf aan Lijf
- 1995 – Het Afscheidsconcert (incl. video)
- 2000 – Hees van Ahoy (incl. DVD)

=== De Gevestigde Orde ===
One off project by the Dutch Pop music foundation: Ernst Jansz, Joost Belinfante, Doe Maar members (without Henny Vrienten) and Bram Vermeulen & his band.

- 1983 – De Gevestigde Orde (live-lp)

=== Rienne Va Plus ===
Trio: Ernst Jansz, Jan Hendriks and singer Rieany (Rienne) Janssen.

- 1990 – Rienne Va Plus
- 1992 – Money Makes Millionaires

=== Producer ===
- 1984 – Drie Heren – Ik Zag Drie Heren...
- 1985 – Blue Murder – La La Love
- 1985 – Claw Boys Claw – Indian Wallpaper
- 1986 – Blue Murder – Talk Talk Talk
- 1986 – Blue Murder – Stalking The Deerpark
- 1991 – Bram Vermeulen – Vriend En Vijand
- 1994 – Bram Vermeulen – Achter Mijn Ogen
- 1995 – Bram Vermeulen – Tijd/Vrije Tijd
- 1997 – Bram Vermeulen – Polonaise
- 1997 – Boudewijn de Groot – Een hele tour: Gent
- 1998 – Bram Vermeulen – Allemaal
- 2004 – Boudewijn de Groot – Eiland In De Verte
- 2005 – Boudewijn de Groot – Een Avond in Brussel, cd/DVD
- 2007 – Boudewijn de Groot – Lage Landen Tour, cd/DVD

== Bibliography ==
- 1983 – Gideons Droom (novel)
- 1985 – De Overkant (novel)
- 2006 – Molenbeekstraat (novel)
