= E. du Perron =

Dutch writer (1899–1940)

- Born: Charles Edgar du Perron; 2 November 1899; Meester Cornelis, Dutch East Indies
- Died: 14 May 1940 (aged 40); Bergen, Netherlands
- Occupations: Novelist; poet; essayist; critic
- Writing career
- Genres: Novel, poetry, essay
- Notable works: Parlando (1930); Country of Origin (1935)
- Movement: Literary modernism

Charles Edgar du Perron, more commonly known as E. du Perron, was a Dutch poet and author. He is best known for his literary acclaimed masterpiece Het Land van herkomst (Country of origin) of 1935. Together with Menno ter Braak and Maurice Roelants he founded the short-lived but influential literary magazine Forum in 1932.

== Biography ==
Charles Edgar ('Eddy') du Perron was born in Meester Cornelis, Batavia, on 2 November 1899, the only son of Charles Emile du Perron and Maria Mina Madeline Bédier de Prairie; wealthy parents of French descent, whose families had been well integrated into the colonial aristocracy of the Dutch East Indies for generations. The bloodline can be traced back to Jean Roch du Perron (born in Bulhon, Auvergne, France, in 1756 – died in Batavia, Dutch East Indies, in 1808). Though a failure in school, the wealth of his parents guaranteed the young Du Perron a comfortable childhood. In an effort to overcome a neurasthenic condition, he took boxing and fencing lessons, and combined his image as a man of action with his writing talent by joining a Batavia-based newspaper.

In 1921, after selling most of their vast land holdings, the Du Perron family moved to Europe and took their son along. They settled in Belgium, in a countryside castle in Gistoux. Fleeing the company of his parents, Du Perron sought refuge in Montmartre, where he stayed for most of 1922 and mingled with the literary and artistic crowds – among them French author Pascal Pia, whom he befriended. Influenced by Pia and his bohemian friends, Du Perron wrote a small volume of satires in French, published under the title Manuscrit trouvé dans une poche. After this questionable debut, he would return to writing in Dutch. Around 1926, he met André Malraux, who had just returned from Indochina and was still unknown as a writer. Malraux would dedicate his 1933 novel La Condition humaine (Man's Fate) to Du Perron, to the surprise of French critics. In his Antimémoirs (1967), Malraux stated: "He was my best friend."

Between 1924 and 1928, Du Perron provided at least part of the financial support for a number of short-lived Flemish avant-garde magazines. His most notable companion in these adventures was poet Paul van Ostaijen. Alpenjagerslied (Song of the Alpine Hunters), one of the last poems Van Ostaijen wrote before his death in 1928, is dedicated to Du Perron.

Du Perron fathered a child with Simone Sechez, his mother's maid, and married her in 1928. Not long after this he met Dutch critic Menno ter Braak. In what was perhaps the most fruitful collaboration in the history of modern Dutch literature, Ter Braak and Du Perron founded the literary magazine Forum, which – though it lasted for only four years – to this day exerts its influence as the most important literary voice of the country.

In 1932 Du Perron divorced Sechez in order to marry fellow author and translator Elisabeth de Roos, with whom he moved to Paris. Shortly after his second wedding his mother died, and Du Perron discovered that every penny of the immense family fortune had been squandered. For some time he continued a precarious existence as free-lancer for Dutch newspapers and periodicals, but with the family inheritance gone up in smoke, the Great Depression hitting Europe and National Socialism rising in Germany, he returned to the Dutch East Indies in 1936.

In the Indies, he continued to write and earned his living as a journalist and correspondent. He worked as a literary critic for the Bataviaasch Nieuwsblad ("Batavian Newspaper"), where he befriended Karel Zaalberg and Ernest Douwes Dekker. In his role as critic he also became the patron of the young Indo author Beb Vuyk. He sympathised with the Indies independence movement and became a close friend to Indonesian intellectual Sutan Sjahrir.

In August 1939, at the end of a stay of nearly three years in his country of origin, du Perron wrote to Sjahrir (now a political exile):

'[...] In any case when in Holland I pretty much have always remained the awkward stranger. Through my French heritage, Indies upbringing and childhood, and through my Dutch language and customs... At the moment some – with whom I disagree – say I have been Europeanised. But put me in the real company of (Dutch East) Indies boys and ten minutes later they will recognize me as one of them. Where I feel at home...?, I know exactly now, that after fifteen years of wandering in Europe, I came back to my country... I belong here.[...]’

Du Perron returned to the Netherlands in 1939, in ill health. On the evening of 14 May 1940, in the village of Bergen, he died of a heart attack caused by angina pectoris after learning that the Dutch army had surrendered to the German invaders. In the exact same hour, his friend Ter Braak committed suicide out of fear of reprisals for his opposition to the Nazis.

== Major works ==
=== Early poetry ===
Early in his career, Du Perron wrote a number of poems that fall under the heading of "priapic literature", named for the Priapeia. De koning en zijn min is a narrative poem in fourteen stanzas, detailing the sexual adventures of a 17-year-old king and his sexual encounter with his wet nurse. Het lied van vrouwe Carola (1927) is modeled after medieval ballads, and sees a woman of the nobility taking the place of her son's lover. In memoriam Agathae is a crown of sonnets that Du Perron self-published in 1924 under the pseudonym W. C. Kloot van Neukema, and its final sonnet closes with a sestet adapted from a sonnet by Willem Kloos. In 1937, Du Perron worked on a volume containing all of his old erotic poems under the title Kloof tegen cylinder ("Chasm against cylinder"), to be published under the pseudonym Cesar Bombay, a reference to one of Stendhal's pen names.

=== Country of Origin ===
Du Perron's masterpiece, Country of Origin (1935), is a combination of reflections on a childhood in the Indies and contemporary reporting on Western Europe in the period between the two world wars. Because of its Indies-set chapters, a panorama of colonial life in West Java at the turn of the century, the novel has gained the reputation of one of the most important Dutch novels dealing with the colony, second only to Max Havelaar. In the European chapters, labyrinthine discussions between Ducroo and his friends are a rendering of the intellectual climate of Paris in the 1930s.

The novel is heavily – though not entirely – autobiographical, and Du Perron's real-life friends are easily recognisable: under the name Héverlé, André Malraux is presented in his early period of left-wing activism, while the characters of Viala and Guraev are shadows of Pascal Pia and Alexandre Alexeieff, respectively. Wijdenes, one of the Dutchmen portrayed in the novel, is modeled after Menno ter Braak, Graaflant after Jan Greshoff, and Rijckloff after the poet A. Roland Holst.

Characteristics such as the focus on the individual as opposed to the social, a profound introversion and self-conscious reflexiveness, and the integration of various narrative levels and numerous incongruous compositional elements (letters, dialogues, and diary fragments) make Country of Origin a prime example of Dutch modernist prose.

=== Translations ===
Apart from his own poetry and prose, Du Perron published several translations from French (Valery Larbaud, André Malraux) and one from English (Walter Savage Landor).

== Legacy ==
In 1994 the E. du Perron Society was founded. This Dutch literary society, devoted to a single author, has around 70 members and an additional number of subscribers, including several universities and libraries. The society aims to accumulate and deepen the knowledge regarding E. du Perron, both the person and his work, and contribute to the continued appreciation of his literary, artistic and social significance.

Every year Tilburg University awards a cultural prize named after E. du Perron.

== Bibliography ==
- 1923 – Manuscrit trouvé dans une poche
- 1926 – Bij gebrek aan ernst (added to in 1928 and 1932)
- 1927 – Poging tot afstand (poem)
- 1929 – Nutteloos verzet
- 1930 – Parlando (poem)
- 1931 – Voor kleine parochie
- 1931 – Vriend of vijand
- 1932 – Mikrochaos
- 1933 – Tegenonderzoek
- 1933 – Uren met Dirk Coster (essay)
- 1934 – De smalle mens (essay)
- 1935 – Het land van herkomst (novel)
- 1936 – Blocnote klein formaat (essay)
- 1937 – De man van Lebak
- 1938 – Multatuli, tweede pleidooi
- 1939 – Schandaal in Holland
- 1941 – De grijze dashond (poem) (with preface by Simon Vestdijk)
- 1942 – Een grote stilte
- 1943 – Scheepsjournaal van Arthur Ducroo
- 1955–1959 – Verzameld werk
- 1962–1967 – Menno ter Braak/E.d.P. Briefwisseling 1930–1940 (4 vols.)
- 1977–1990 – Brieven (9 vols.)
