= Victor Ido =

Dutch writer and journalist (1869–1948)

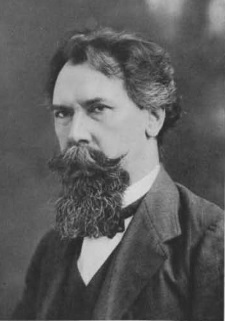
Hans van de Wall (Victor Ido)

Victor Ido (8 February 1869, in Surabaya – 20 May 1948, in The Hague) is the main alias of the Indo (Eurasian) Dutch language writer and journalist Hans van de Wall. Born in Surabaya, Dutch East Indies (colonial Indonesia) from a Dutch father and Indo (Eurasian) mother. Ido was the Art Editor of P.A.Daum's Bataviaasch Nieuwsblad and later the Chief Editor of newspaper Batavia's Handelsblad as well as an accomplished musician (organist).

As a literary author his work shows a keen eye for the discrimination and socio-economic realities of middle and lower class Indo-Europeans of the late 19th century.

As a playwright, he incorporated many indigenous (i.e. Indonesian) cultural elements into a western theatrical format.

== Early life ==
Ido's mother's Indo (Eurasian) family belonged to the lower social layer of European society, where constant lack of money, outright poverty and a continues struggle for existence characterized life in the late 19th century. Ido incorporated these experiences into his literary work.

Due to an inheritance he and his brother had the opportunity to go to the Netherlands and study the arts (music). After his stay in the Netherlands he seemed detached from his old maternal world, as can be seen in his novel Don Juan (1897), which is partly set in the high society of Batavia. After a while though his writing re-focuses on his roots.

== Novelist ==
In 1900 the Java Bode newspaper published his serialised novel "The pariah of Glodok", a tale about an impoverished Indo-European. The story ends somewhat melodramatic, but caters to the need within the Indo community to see an identification and recognition of their socio-economic problems.

In his later novel "The paupers" (1915) he stuck with this theme. It tells the story of a so-called "kleine bung" (a Dutch-Malay mix term meaning little brother used to describe Indos from the lower layer of society) who is full of resentment and frustration, caused by discrimination, lack of social climbing and living in poverty. Ido vividly describes the characters resentment against the white European expatriates that treat him as a second class citizen. The latest edition was published in 1978.

== Play writer ==
Another important achievement was the way Ido used indigenous culture, i.e. Javanese epics and lyrics as inspiration for the many plays he wrote. His popular plays had been performed on numerous occasions in colonial theatres. To this day plays by Ido are still performed in Indonesia.

"...a fascinating picture of the ethnically-diverse theatre staged in colonial Batavia and of processes of revival, reinterpretation and erasure of these activities in more recent times. An example cited is the Dutch language play Karinda Adinda by Eurasian playwright Victor Ido staged in Batavia in 1913 and re-presented in Indonesian translation in 1993. The later performance occurred at a commemorative festival at the Gedung Kesenian Jakarta, the refurbished Shouwburg Weltevreden theatre where the play had first been performed.

In the 1993 version, however, (...) the stinging denunciation of native feudalism and patriarchal authority, inspired by European-derived values, is muted to fit the conditions of post-colonial New Order Indonesia.

The event commemorated Ido as a Dutch rather than a Eurasian playwright, for within a nationalist, us-and-them understanding of Indonesian (theatre) history, the substantial contributions of Eurasian and Chinese plays, playwrights and performers are largely ignored."

With regard to his critics Ido once said: "Kids, dogs and plays should not be liked by all. Everybody's friend has no character."

== Work ==
- Don Juan (1897)
- Langs een afgrond (1904)
- De paupers (1912)
- Karina Adinda (1914)
- De paupers (1915)
- De paria van Glodok (1916)
- Pangéran Negoro Joedho (1921)
- De dochters van den resident (1922)
