= Evert Jansen =

Dutch newspaper editor and politician

Evert Jansen was a newspaper editor, journalist and politician from the Dutch East Indies. From the 1910s to the 1940s, he was editor of a number of major papers including De Locomotief, Bataviaasch Nieuwsblad, Algemeen handelsblad voor Nederlandsch-Indië, and De Indische Courant.

== Biography ==
=== Early life ===
After finishing his studies in a Hogere Burgerschool in the Netherlands in the early 1910s, he was sent by the PTT (Staatsbedrijf der Posterijen, Telegrafie en Telefonie, the state-owned company for post, telegraphs and telephones) to study further in Cologne, Germany. He studied there for a year and a half, after which he left Europe for the Dutch East Indies.

=== Career in journalism and politics ===
His first newspaper job in the Indies was in October 1915, when he joined the Soerabajasch Nieuwsblad in Surabaya as an editor/reporter. After two years at that paper, he moved to a similar position at a competing paper, the Nieuwe Soerabajasche Courant. He then left Surabaya for Semarang, taking up a position at De Locomotief, where he remained as an editor until 1925. In 1925 he left that paper for Bandung, where he joined the Indische Telegraaf as editor in chief. When that paper, which was a subsidiary of Bataviaasch Nieuwsblad, was closed, he headed to work for the parent paper in Batavia.

In early 1926 he was working as a correspondent for the Soerabaijasch Handelsblad in Yogyakarta when he was offered a position as acting editor-in-chief of a relatively new newspaper from Semarang called the Algemeen handelsblad voor Nederlandsch-Indië. This appointment was made more permanent and full-time in January of the following year.

During his time in Semarang, Jansen became involved in an Indo advocacy organization called the Indo Europeesch Verbond (IEV), and was appointed to their board in 1928. In early 1929, when the previous IEV representative on the city council died, he stepped forward as the organization's new representative. However, since he left Semarang before the end of the year, he was not in the position for long.

In July 1929, he was charged with a Persdelict (press offense)--he was held responsible, as editor, for printing an article that insulted the good name of Mr. Minderman, the fired head of a local school, who was accused of forgery and misappropriation of school funds. He was found guilty and given a punishment of 150 guilders or 14 days imprisonment.

In late 1929 Jansen stepped down as editor of the Algemeen Handelsblad and left Semarang to become editor of at least two Dutch-language newspapers in East Java, De Malanger in Malang and De Indische Courant in Surabaya.
