= Freemasonry in Indonesia =

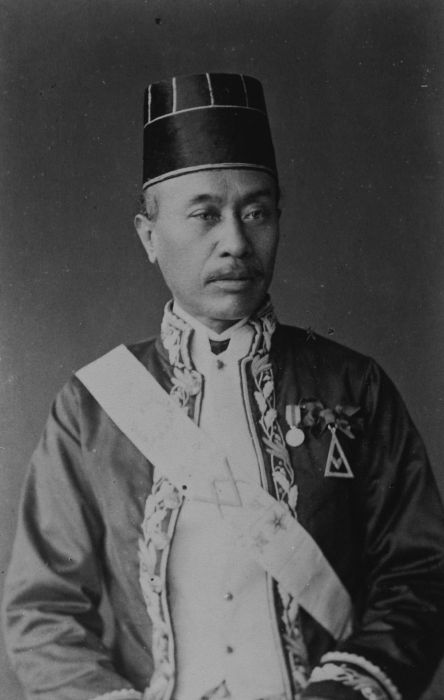
Javanese regent & freemason.

Freemasonry was introduced by the Dutch to what is today Indonesia during the VOC era in the 18th century, and spread throughout the Dutch East Indies during a wave of westernisation in the 19th century. Freemasons originally only included Europeans and Indo-Europeans, but later also indigenous people with a Western education.

Active freemasonry existed throughout the Dutch East Indies (now: Indonesia) from 1762 to 1962. The first lodge in Asia "La Choisie" was founded in Batavia by Jacobus Cornelis Mattheus Radermacher (1741–1783). In July 1772, Abraham van der Weijden established the Lodge La Fidele Sinceritie in Batavia. In 1922, a Dutch Provincial Grand Lodge, under the Grand Orient of the Netherlands, at Weltevreden (Batavia) controlled twenty Lodges in the colony. Fourteen in Java, three in Sumatra and others in places such as Makassar.

The lodges in the colony played a role in the social emancipation of the Indo-Europeans, as well as of the so-called Foreign Orientals, such as the ethnic-Chinese and Arabs. Freemasonry also had a significant impact on the Indonesian National Awakening preluding the national revolution. In 1836, the painter Raden Saleh was the first indigenous person to become a freemason and joined the lodge Eendracht maakt Macht in The Hague. The first indigenous member of a lodge in the Dutch East Indies was Abdul Rachman, a descendant of the sultan of Pontianak, in 1844. A famous freemason and Grand Master (Masonic) was the Indo politician Dick de Hoog, who was the main leader of the Indo emancipation movement and president of the Indo European Alliance. Other prominent Freemasons were the Peranakan tycoon Loa Po Seng and his half-Indo grandson, the politician and parliamentarian Loa Sek Hie.

== List of lodges (historical) ==
Most lodges were closed during the Japanese occupation, unless otherwise indicated. All lodges in Indonesia were closed when freemasonry was outlawed by Sukarno in 1961. Specific lodges in the Dutch East Indies included:

- lodge nummer 31 : La Constante et Fidèle, Semarang (became Indonesian in 1960, closed 1962);
- lodge nummer 46 : Mata Hari, Padang;
- lodge nummer 53 : Mataram, Jokjakarta;
- lodge nummer 55 : l'Union Frédéric Royal, Surakarta;
- lodge nummer 61 : Prins Frederik, Kota Raja;
- lodge nummer 64 : Veritas, Probolinggo;
- lodge nummer 65 : Arbeid Adelt, Makassar;
- lodge nummer 70 : Deli, Medan;
- lodge nummer 82 : Tidar, Magelang;
- lodge nummer 83 : Fraternitas, Salatiga;
- lodge nummer 84 : Sint Jan, Bandung (closed 1960);
- lodge nummer 87 : Humanitas, Tegal;
- lodge nummer 89 : Malang, Malang;
- lodge nummer 92 : Blitar, Blitar;
- lodge nummer 110 : Het Zuiderkruis, Meester Cornelis, Batavia (closed 1955);
- lodge nummer 111 : De Broederketen, Batavia (closed 1948);
- lodge nummer 129 : De Driehoek, Jember;
- lodge nummer 142 : Broedertrouw, Bandung;
- lodge nummer 149 : Palembang, Palembang (closed 1958);
- lodge nummer 151 : De Hoeksteen, Sukabumi;
- lodge nummer 153 : Serajoedal, Purwokerto;
- lodge nummer 165 : De Witte Roos, Batavia (closed 1958)
- lodge nummer 182 : Purwa Daksina, Batavia (became Indonesian in 1955, closed 1962);
- lodge nummer 183 : Dharma, Bandung (became Indonesian 1955, closed 1962);
- lodge nummer 192 : Bhakti, Semarang (became Indonesian in 1955, closed 1962);
- lodge nummer 193 : Pamitran, Surabaya; (became Indonesian in 1955, closed 1962);
- lodge nummer 225 : De Ster in het Oosten, Hollandia, Dutch New Guinea (closed in 1963).

== Historical images ==
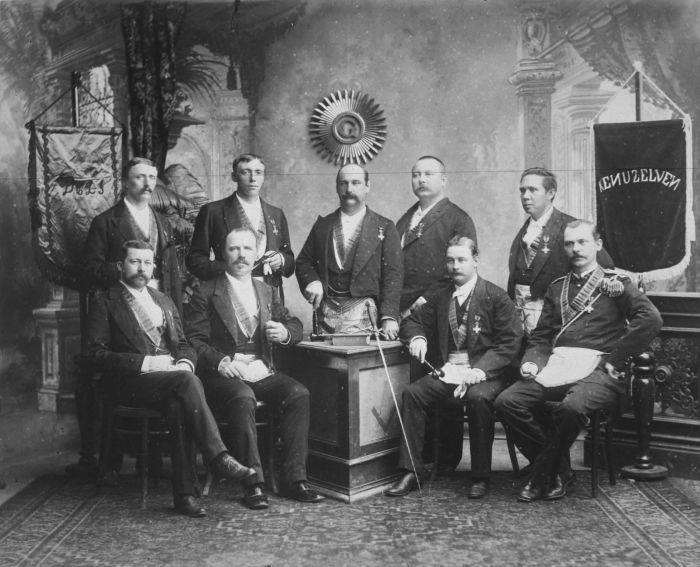
Loge 70, Deli, Medan

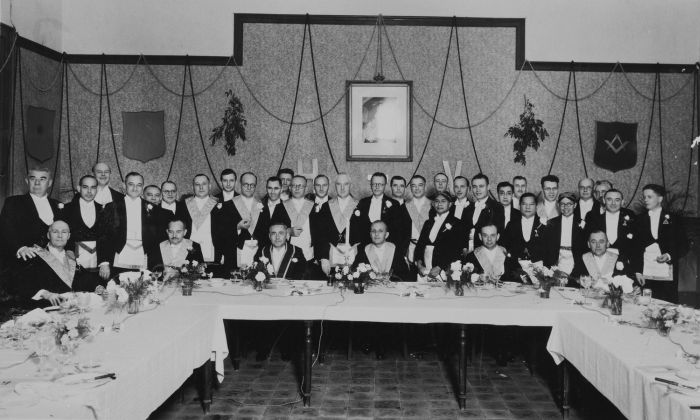
Unspecified

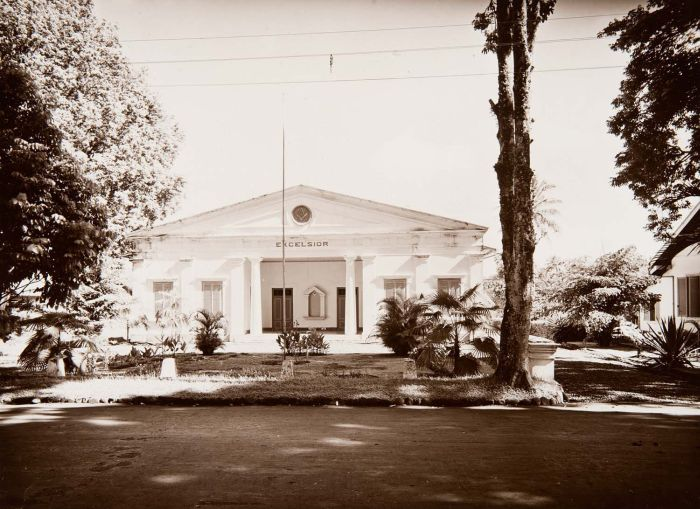
Excelsior, Buitenzorg

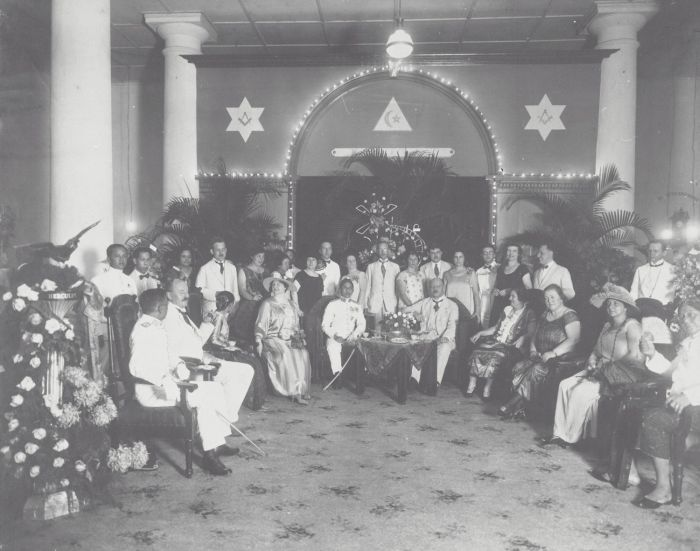
Loge 53, Mataram, Jogjakarta

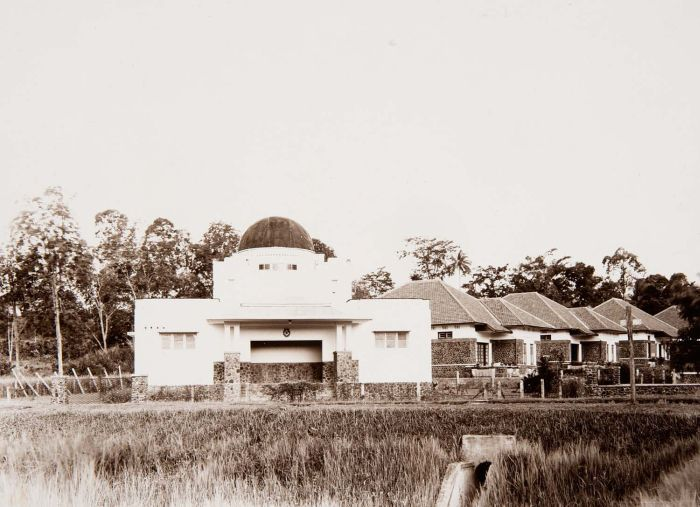
Le Droit humain, Buitenzorg

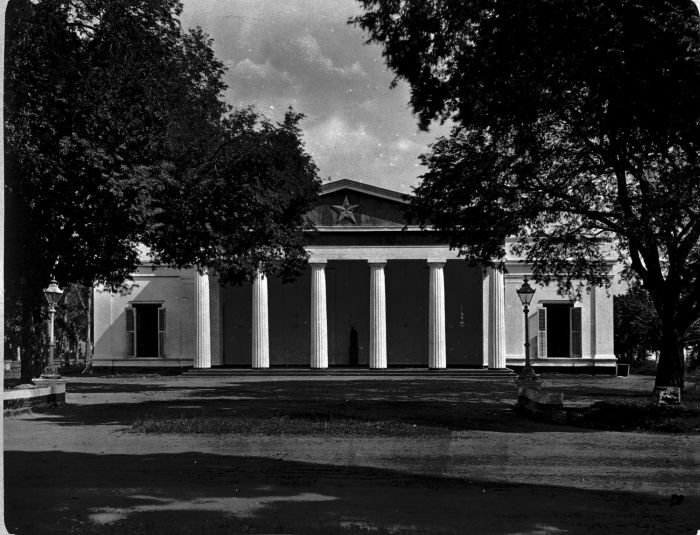
Weltevreden, Batavia

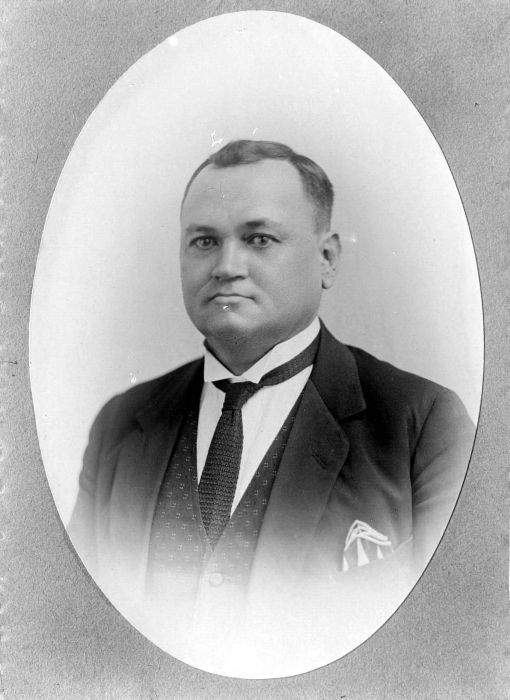
Dick de Hoog, Grand Master (Masonic), of the Grand Orient of the Netherlands on Java.

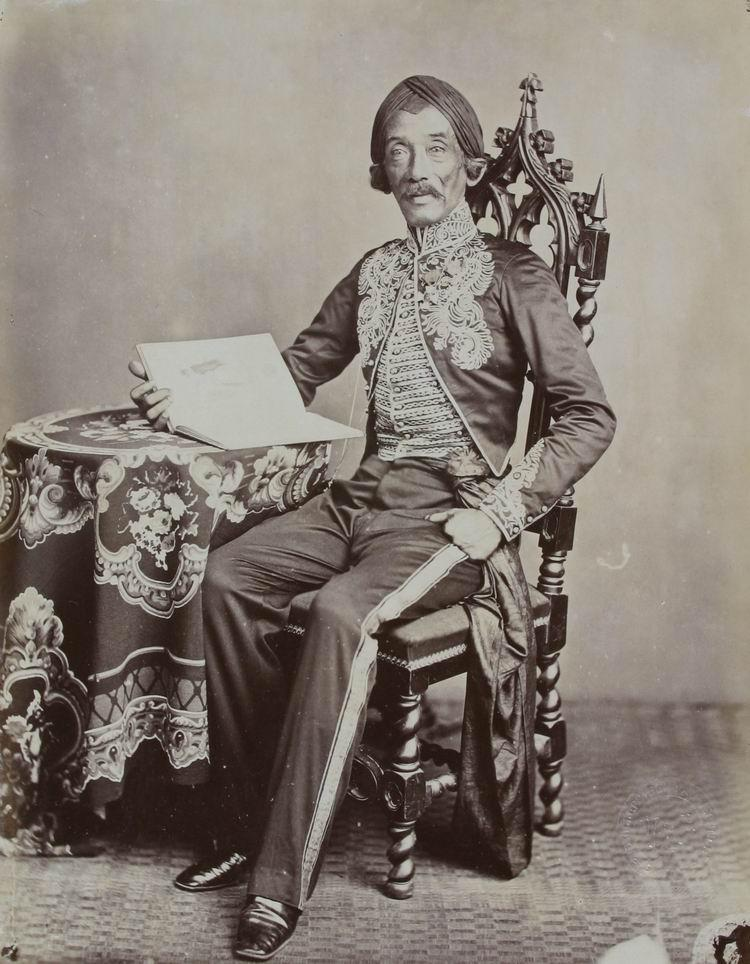
Raden Saleh, Javanese nobel and famous painter was the first indigenous freemason.
