= Algemeen Handelsblad voor Nederlandsch-Indië =

Dutch-language newspaper

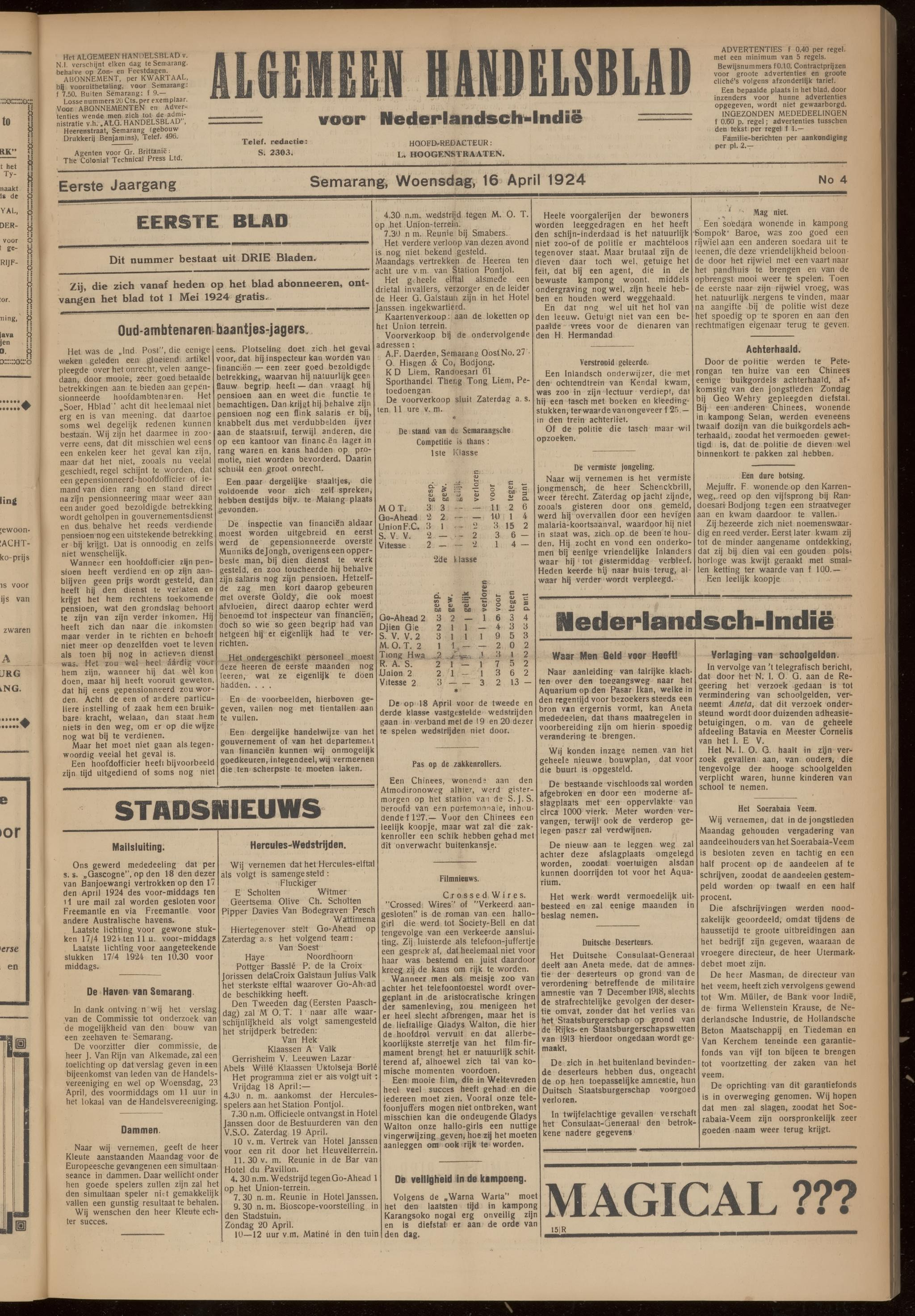
Front page of Algemeen handelsblad voor Nederlandsch-Indië, April 16, 1924

Algemeen handelsblad voor Nederlandsch-Indië (Dutch: General trade newspaper for the Dutch East Indies) was a Dutch language newspaper, published from 1924 to 1942 in Semarang, Dutch East Indies.

== History ==
=== 1924-1926: Founding under Hoogenstraaten ===
The Algemeen handelsblad was established in Semarang in 1924 as a competitor to De Locomotief, one of the most successful Dutch language newspapers in the Indies. It was printed in the presses of N.V. Drukkerij Benjamins and already promised to offer full wire service—the mark of a well-funded newspaper.

The first editor of the paper was L.M.C. Hoogenstraaten. In preparing to launch the paper he announced that it would not have any particular political position but that it would be supportive of development of the "land and people". In June 1926 the paper announced on its front page that Hoogenstraaten was no longer associated with them. According to a wire sent out by ANETA, he had been fired due to a difference of opinion with the management.

=== 1926-1929: Challenging authority under Jansen ===
In June 1926, the paper announced that Evert Jansen, who signed his name E. Jansen, would take over editorial duties. He had until recently been a correspondent working for the Soerabaijasch Handelsblad in Yogyakarta. But he had worked in various newspapers in the Indies since 1915, including major papers like De Locomotief and Bataviaasch Nieuwsblad. This appointment was made more permanent and full-time in January of the following year.

Jansen must have been a member of the mixed-race Indo community because he became involved in the Indo Europeesch Verbond organization and was appointed to their board. In early 1929, when the previous representative died, he stepped forward as the organization's new representative on the Semarang city council. However, since he left Semarang before the end of the year, he himself would be replaced in that position before long.

In July 1929, he was charged with a Persdelict (press offense)--he was held responsible, as editor, for printing an article that insulted the good name of Mr. Minderman, the fired head of a local school, who was accused of forgery and misappropriation of school funds. He was found guilty and given a punishment of 150 guilders or 14 days imprisonment.

In late 1929 Jansen stepped down as editor of the Handelsblad and left Semarang to become editor of at least two Dutch-language newspapers in East Java, De Malanger in Malang and De Indische Courant in Surabaya.

=== 1930-1937: Financial problems under Leertouwer ===
W. Leertouwer, who had until recently been editor of the magazine Sumatra in Medan and De Malanger in Malang, took over Jansen's duties in the summer of 1930. It was a difficult time to work at the newspaper, as it was hit very hard by the start of the Great Depression, which caused deep financial problems for the company that owned the paper, N.V. Benjamins.

During the 1930s the paper's license to publish was temporarily suspended, along with a number of other Dutch-language papers, over coverage of the Zeven Provienciën uprising, a mutiny on a Dutch warship. The colonial government was worried about the widespread labour unrest that might be incited by continuing coverage of the event.

In 1936, the paper was taken over by its more popular competitor, De Locomotief. Leertouwer and P. Scheepers were kept on as editors and it continued to be run as a separate newspaper.

=== 1939-1942: WWII brings an end under Scheepers ===
The editor of the paper in its final years was P. Scheepers, who, like his predecessor Jansen, was active in the Indo Europeesch Verbond, as well as local sports organizations in Semarang, including football and cycling. He was editor of De Stadion-Revue, a football magazine. He had also worked as an editor at the Handelsblad during Leertouwer's tenure, although the exact year he began is not clear.

The Algemeen Handelsblad ceased publication at some point in early 1942 during the Japanese occupation of the Dutch East Indies, and never resumed after the war.
