= Dick de Hoog =

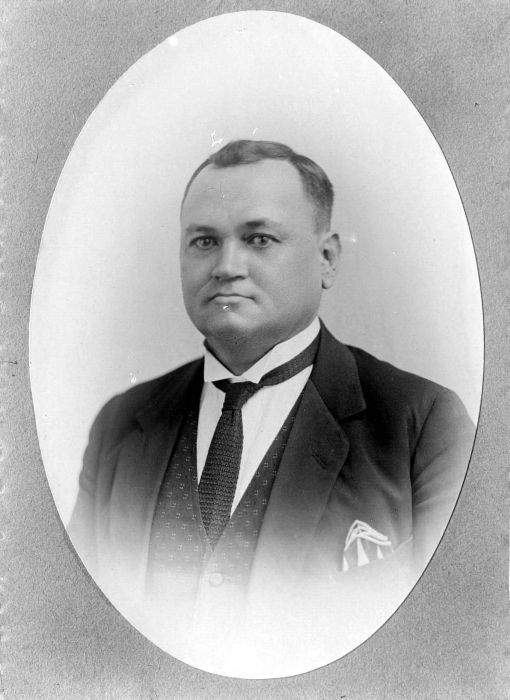
- Dick de Hoog, IEV President and political champion for Indo emancipation.
- Born: Frederik Hermanus de Hoog; 16 June 1881; Amboina, Dutch East Indies
- Died: 3 January 1939 (aged 57); Bandoeng, Dutch East Indies
- Occupation: Politician

Frederik Hermanus "Dick" de Hoog (16 June 1881 – 3 January 1939) was the Indo (Eurasian) president of the Indo-European Alliance, a member of the People's Council, and a professional politician in the Dutch East Indies. He was also a Grand Master (Masonic) of the Dutch East Indies Freemasonry (Grand Orient of the Netherlands).

He was born in Ambon and died in Bandung, Dutch East Indies. He was the son of a Dutch man Johannes Hermanus Josephus de Hoog, employed in the Dutch East Indies Navy, and Indo (Eurasian) mother Susanna Beekman. He was married to the Indo-Chinese Kiong Nio Oei (1874–1961). The couple had two adoptive children.

After an expeditious and successful professional career Dick de Hoog went into politics and became the undisputed leader of the Indo Europeesch Verbond (English: Indo-European Alliance), the most important Indo-emancipation movement of the time. As its representative, he became a professional politician and full-time member of the Dutch East Indies 'Volksraad', an infant form of parliament.

He successfully united all Indo-social layers and built the largest Indo organisation in the Dutch East Indies. His organisation became the biggest political fraction represented in the People's Assembly fighting for race equality and a self-sufficient and independent nation, albeit as a dominion in a larger Dutch commonwealth.

A popular figure among Indos in the Dutch East Indies he became the face and voice of Indo emancipation. Emerging as the IEV's leader he was a champion of Indo interests in the Dutch East Indies until he died in 1939.

== Social career ==
De Hoog was the youngest of 5 children. Due to the death of his father when he was still an infant toddler, the family was unable to afford appropriate schooling for the brilliant and inquisitive boy. Fortunately, a scholarship granted by the Freemasons Lodge enabled De Hoog to graduate cum laude at the Surabaya HBS at 16. He started his professional career as a clerk in Surabaya and at age 19 joined the State Railway company. Within a few years, he was promoted to chief of its main cargo freight station. By 1905 he was station chief in Jombang, where his career halted because the highest job positions in the Dutch East Indies were restricted to people educated in the Netherlands and were usually occupied by expatriate Dutchmen.

With financial help from a friend, the already-married De Hoog, was able to pursue an academic education in the Netherlands in 1914. In record time he graduated from Leiden University in 1916. The next year he and his wife traveled back to the Dutch East Indies via the United States. In Batavia he became the right-hand man of the director of the State Railway company and in 1922 its principal officer in Jogjakarta. In 1925 he was promoted again and moved to Bandung as Inspector First Class.

== Political career ==
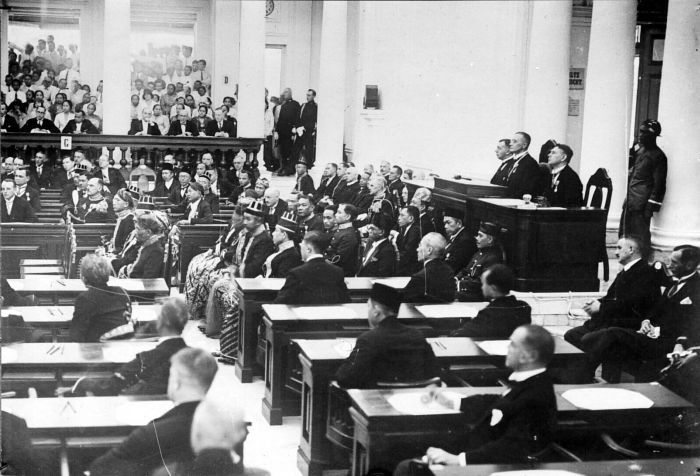
Opening ceremony of the Volksraad, Batavia, Dutch East Indies, 1930.

Meanwhile, De Hoog had also commenced his political career and soon became the main leader of the IEV (Indo-European Alliance), the most important Indo-emancipation movement of the time. Founded by Karel Zaalberg in 1919 De Hoog joined the IEV board of directors in 1920. In 1922 he became its vice-president and in 1923 its representative in the Volksraad an infant form of parliament. When in 1927 he joined the 'Board of Delegates, responsible for the daily administration of the 'Volksraad', he requested an honorable discharge from his job with the State Railway organisation.

De Hoog was dedicated to his political aspirations. After initially having a two-headed presidency De Hoog became the IEV's sole President in 1929. That same year De Hoog, lovingly nicknamed the 'Big Boss', was responsible for attracting close to 15,000 members. In 1930 he became deputy chairman of the 'Board of Delegates' and vice chairman of the 'Volksraad'. The IEV had grown into the largest political fraction in the 'Volksraad'. In his political functions, De Hoog proved to be a skillful administrator, politician, and orator. Both friend and foe praised his immaculate memory, subject matter knowledge, discretion, and strong work ethic.

De Hoog considered solidarity essential to further emancipation and his priority was to ensure unity within all social layers of the Indo community of the plural and polarized Dutch East Indies. Under his leadership, the organisation struggled to acquire both civil rights for natives of the colony as well as increased self-determination for the Dutch East Indies. The colonial authorities however continued to procrastinate democratic progress and the Dutch East Indies remained considerably more centralised and conservative than the Netherlands. Key issues like uplifting the ban on land ownership for Indos and autonomy for the colony were never resolved.

== Final years ==
In 1938 the IEV celebrated De Hoog's 10 years as president and a social fund was named after him. He was at the height of his fame and had acquired significant nicknames such as the 'uncrowned King of the IEV' and the 'Indo general'. His health however started failing and after several heart failures, he suffered a fatal stroke at age 57. His death in 1939 was front-page news in both the Dutch East Indies and the Netherlands and his burial in Bandung was an impressive event paying homage to his work for the Indo community.

Although during his lifetime he was widely acknowledged as the undisputed leader of the IEV and a popular and respected champion of Indo emancipation in the Dutch East Indies, his organisation was unable to build up enough influence to reverse the ongoing marginalisation of the vulnerable Indo community. After the great change of paradigm during WWII the IEV was unable to surmount the vicissitudes of the clash between Dutch colonialism and the Indonesian independence movement.

== See also ==
- Karel Zaalberg
- Indo Europeesch Verbond
