= Indos in pre-colonial history =

Indo people (short for Indo-European) are a Eurasian people of mixed Asian and European descent. Through the 16th-18th centuries, they were known by the name Mestiço (Dutch: Mestiezen). To this day, they form one of the largest Eurasian communities in the world. The early beginning of this community started with the arrival of Portuguese traders in South East Asia in the 16th century. The second large wave started with the arrival of the Dutch East India Company (VOC) employees in the 17th century and throughout the 18th century. Even though the VOC is often considered a state within a state, formal colonisation by the Dutch only commenced in the 19th century.

== The position of Indos in pre-colonial Dutch East Indies history (16th, 17th and 18th century) ==
Before the formal colonization of the East Indies by the Dutch in the 19th century, the islands of South East Asia had already been in frequent contact with European traders. Portuguese maritime traders were present as early as the 16th century. Around its trading posts the original Portuguese Indo population, called Mestiço, had developed. In the 17th century, the Dutch started to expand its mercantile enterprise and military presence in the East Indies in an effort to establish trade monopolies to maximise profit. Even after the Portuguese competition was beaten by the Dutch maritime traders of the VOC, the Portuguese Indo (aka Mestiço) communities remained active in local and intra-island trade. The Dutch found merit in collaboration with these early Eurasian communities through their role as intermediaries with local traders, but also to help mitigate the threat of the encroaching British traders. In the first century of Dutch (VOC) dominance, the cultural influence of the Portuguese Indo population continued as can be seen by the fact that Portuguese Malay mix languages remained in existence well into the second century of the VOC era and autonomous Portuguese Indo groups existed into the 19th century. To this day, several surviving families of Portuguese descent can still be found in the Indo community. Family names include: Dias, Pereira, Rozario, Simao.

=== Portuguese roots of Indo society ===
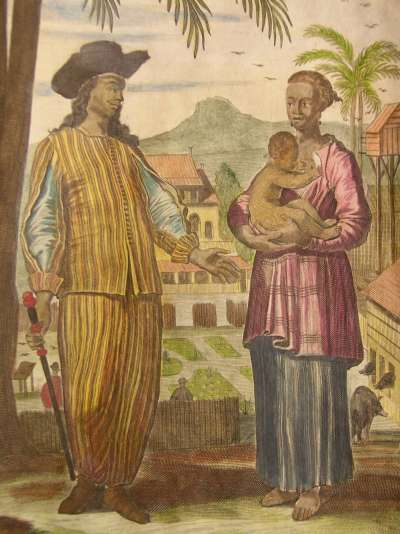
Painting of a Portuguese Mardijker and his wife, 1704.

Originally the greatest source of profit in the East Indies, was the intra-islands trade within the archipelago (Dutch: inlandse handel) and the intra-Asiatic trade in general. Here one commodity was exchanged for another, with profit at each turn. This included the trade of silver from the Americas, more desirable in the East than in Europe. In this trade the original Indo or Mestizo population remained to play an intermediary role.

The VOC made good use of such (Indo) people, born and brought up locally. They could speak the language of their birth country and understood its conventions, and proved excellent middlemen for the Europeans. For the same reason these Eurasians were extremely useful for Asian rulers. Historian Ulbe Bosma.

Even long after the Dutch had defeated and expelled their Portuguese competition from the islands, the language of trade remained the Malay/Portuguese mix language, which is reflected in the relatively many Portuguese words that survive in the Indonesian language to this day. The census taken of the population of Ambon island in 1860, still showed 778 Dutch Europeans and 7793 mostly Mestiço and Ambonese 'Burghers'. Portuguese/Malay speaking Indo communities existed not only in the Moluccas, Flores and Timor. But also in Batavia (now Jakarta) where it remained the dominant language up to 1750.

The longevity of Portuguese cultural influence exerted via their Eurasian population is explained by the inclusive approach they had towards their national identity. Portuguese Admiral Afonso de Albuquerque (1453-1515) stated:

"Colonies and natives are not mere possessions to be exploited. They must be considered continuations of Portugal, and all those living there, regardless their skin colour, must feel Portuguese, and as such must have the same liberties and must be inspired by the same ideals, honouring the same traditions and be ruled by the same institutions. In this conception skin colour is no more than a mere coincidence."

==== Portuguese Creole Language ====
For the Mestizo-Indo of the pre-colonial era their first language was often the Portuguese creole language called Portugis, based on Malay and Portuguese. It remained the dominant lingua franca for trade throughout the archipelago from the 16th century through the early 19th century. Many Portugis words survive in the Malay language including: sabun (from sabão = soap), meja (from mesa = table), boneka (from boneca = doll), jendela (from janela = window), gereja (from igreja = church), bola (from bola = ball), bendera (from bandeira = flag), roda (from roda = wheel), gagu (from gago = stutterer), sepatu (from sapato = shoes), kereta (from carreta = wagon), bangku (from banco = chair), keju (from queijo = cheese), garpu (from garfo = fork), terigu (from trigo = flour), mentega (from manteiga = butter), Minggu (from domingo = Sunday) and Belanda (from Holanda = Dutch).

The word Sinyo (from Señor) was used for Indo boy and young man and the word Nona or the variation Nonni (from Dona) for Indo girls or young women. In yet another derivation of the original Portuguese word that means lady a mature Indo woman was called Nyonya, sometimes spelled Nonya. This honorific loan word came to be used to address all women of foreign descent.

==== Mardijker people ====
Another notable Portuguese/Malay speaking group were the Mardijker people, which the VOC legally acknowledged as a separate ethnic group. Most of them were freed Portuguese slaves with ethnic roots in India and Africa, but of Christian faith. Eventually the term came into use for any freed slave and is the word from which the Malay word 'Merdeka' meaning freedom is derived. This group and its descendants heavily inter-married with the Portuguese Mestiço community. Kampung Tugu was a famous Mardijker settlement in Batavia, but Mardijker quarters could be found in all major trading posts including Ambon and Ternate. The majority of this group eventually assimilated completely into the larger Indo Eurasian community and disappear from the records. Into the 18th century, Indo culture remained dominantly Portuguese/Malay in nature.

==== Topasses people ====
An independent group of Mestiço of Portuguese descent were the Topasses people who were based in Solor, Flores and pre-dominantly Timor. The community in Larantuka on Flores called themselves Larantuqueiros. This powerful group of Mestiço controlled the sandalwood trade and strongly opposed the Dutch. They manifested themselves very independently and actually fought many wars with both the Dutch and Portuguese in the 17th and 18th century. Portuguese Mestiço that chose not to cooperate with the Dutch and VOC deserters often joined with the Topasses. This group eventually assimilated into the indigenous nobility and Eurasian elite of East Timor. Famous family clans are 'De Hornay' and 'Da Costa', that survive as Timorese Raja to this day.

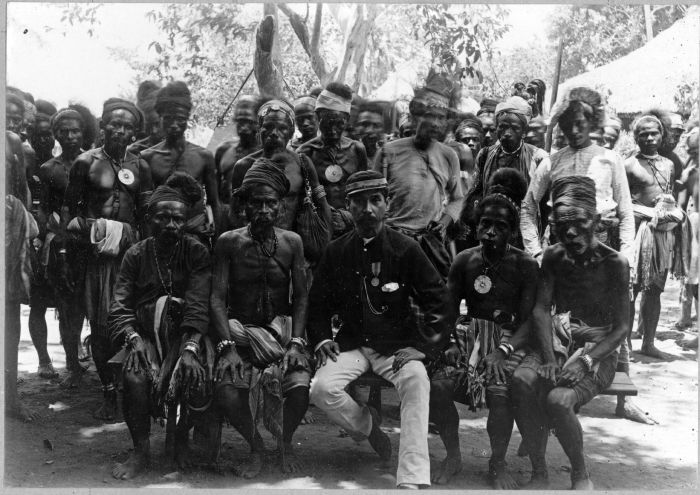
Government official J.Rozet (Indo Eurasian) in negotiation with tribal chiefs (Roti Islanders), Pariti, Timor, 1896.

=== VOC roots of Indo society ===
During the 200 years of the VOC era, intermixing with indigenous peoples kept running its natural course. Over the years the VOC had sent out around 1 million employees, of which only one third returned to Europe. Its personnel consisted of mostly single men traveling without families.

The distance to Europe was far and transport still took a very long time. High mortality rates among its employees were common. To a degree racial mixing was even encouraged by the VOC, as it was aiming to establish a prominent and consistent presence in the East Indies. A considerable number of these men can be considered emigrant settlers, that had no intention of leaving the East Indies, creating their own local Indo Eurasian families.

Moreover, the VOC needed larger European representation to run its local business and therefore stimulated growth in numbers of an Indo population of Dutch descent. These Indos played important roles as VOC officials. VOC representatives, called residents, at the royal courts were often Indos able to speak the indigenous languages.

Over the centuries of intensive Portuguese and Dutch trade with the islands of the East Indies, a relatively large Indo Eurasian population developed. These old Indo families make up the native (Malay: Peranakan) stock of Europeans during the ensuing colonial era. Throughout formal colonisation of the Dutch East Indies in the coming century, the majority of registered Europeans were in fact Indo Eurasians.

==== Mestizo of Kisar ====
In 1665, the VOC built a remote military outpost on the island they named Kisar. From this European outpost on Kisar, a relatively large and almost forgotten Indo Eurasian community developed named the Mestizo of Kisar. To this day, their descendants live as Rajas and chiefs on Kisar. Surviving, mostly Dutch, family names include: Joostenz, Wouthuysen, Caffin, Lerrick, Peelman, Lander, Ruff, Bellmin-Belder, Coenradi, van Delsen, Schilling and Bakker. In 1795, the Kisar Mestizio were under English rule, in 1803 under Dutch/French rule and in 1810 again under English rule. In 1817, Kisar was returned to Dutch rule until the outpost was abandoned in 1819. After that time Kisar Mestizo upheld close ties with their Mestizo neighbours on Timor and by and large integrated into indigenous society.

The Kisar Mestizo were made famous in 1928 by the German Professor E. Rodenwaldt who published his study "Die Mestizen auf Kisar", "Mikroskopische Beobachtungen an den Haaren der Kisaresen und Kisarbastarde". His two volume work details measurements and photographs of the observed Kisar Mestizos and contains a family tree showing the very complicated inter-marriages between the descendants of Mestizo families, as well as indicating skin, eye, and hair colour heredity. The study shows a unique natural experiment spanning over two centuries and is considered an essential academic work in the area of human heredity.

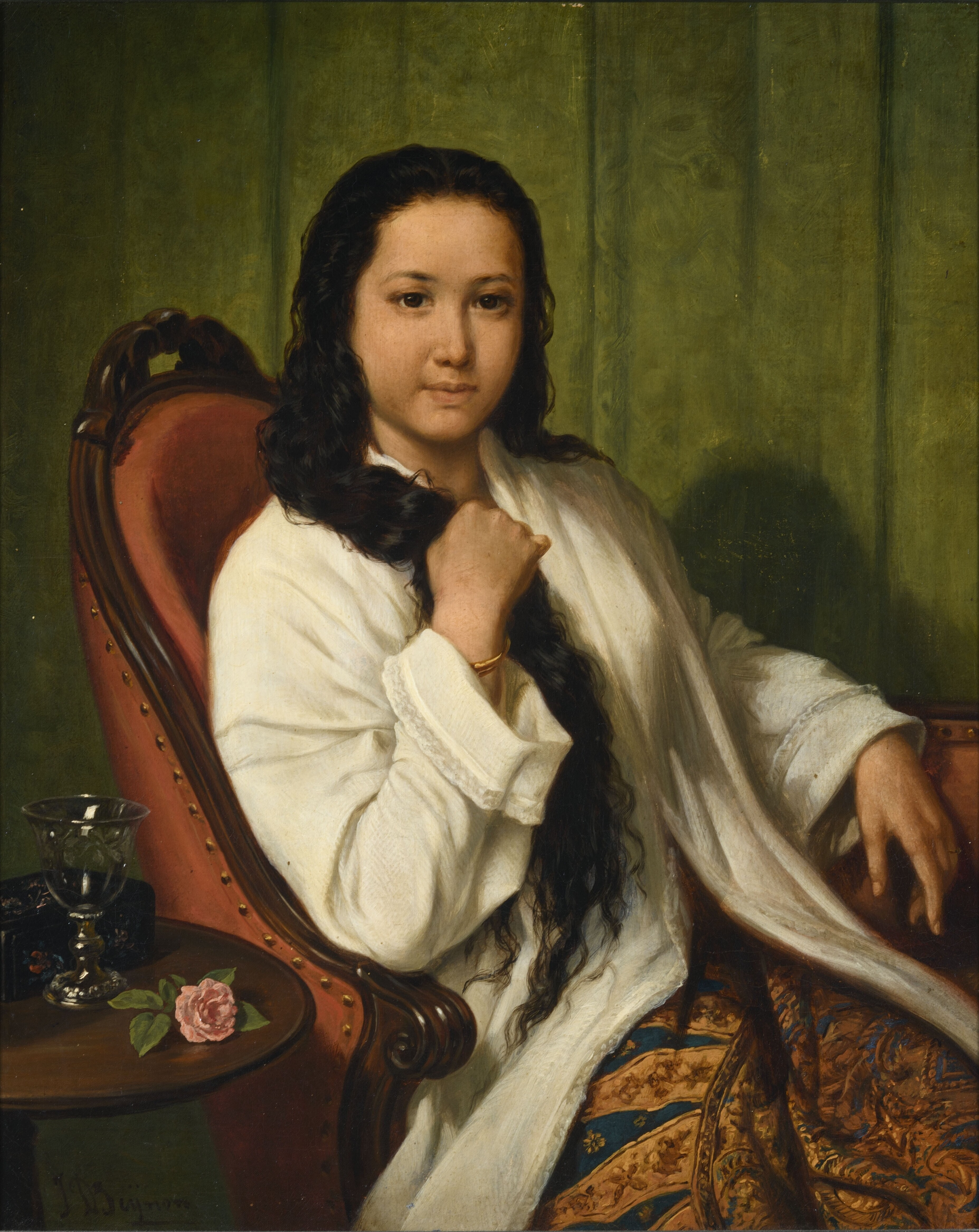
Oil painting depicting an Indo woman in traditional 'batik sarong kebaya' dress, an originally indigenous aristocratic dress style from the 16th century and commonly worn by Eurasian women well into the 20th century.

==== Indo society ====
Pre-colonial Indo culture dominated the European segment of society in the East Indies. This culture was heavily Eurasian i.e. hybrid in nature and even the most high ranking Dutch VOC officials were absorbed by it. Indo society was polyglot and its first languages were Malay, Portugis and other creole languages, not Dutch. It was also matriarchal and most Europeans, even the VOC governor-generals would marry into Indo clans. Only by doing so they were able to obtain the necessary connections, patronage, and wealth.

"Women based clans absorbed the immigrant males who came without wives. the clan enfolded the newcomer in a network of immigrants with locally born wives, mestizo (Indo) and Asian (Indonesian) kin alike. In the same time the clan eased the adoption of Indies manners for the newcomers." Historian Jean Gelman Taylor in The social world of Batavia, European and Eurasian in Dutch Asia.

The arts and crafts patronized by the Indo elite were usually indigenous e.g. gamelan, batik, various court dances, etc. In their immediate personal habitat, they were closely surrounded by indigenous servants. Overall, lifestyle was similar to the indigenous elite. Female clothing was often indistinguishable from indigenous fancy dress and many practices were rooted in ancient indigenous court culture.

In an attempt to mitigate cultural dominance of Indo society, the expatriate aristocrat baron van Imhoff (1705–1750), VOC governor from 1743 to 1750, founded several institutions to cultivate Dutch culture among the native colonial elite. His Naval Academy for maritime VOC officers in Batavia was exemplary in its aim to foster western identity. Van Imhoff showed how well he understood the strength of the Indo-Europeans' indigenous derived beliefs and manners when he decreed that even the academy's cooks, stewards and servants were to be European. Another academy decree strictly stipulated: "There shall be no native tongues spoken in the house."

Governors also vainly tried to introduce the Dutch language in the VOC operated schools and churches, but Portuguese and Malay remained the dominant languages. Even the highest VOC officials were unable to pass on their own mother tongue to their offspring. In general, the VOC had always recognised the tendency of its servants to be absorbed by the hybrid Indo culture and repeatedly issued regulations limiting higher company positions to men born in the Netherlands.

== See also ==
- Stranger King
- Portuguese Empire
- Indos in colonial history
