= Indos in colonial history =

Eurasian people of mixed Indonesian and European descent

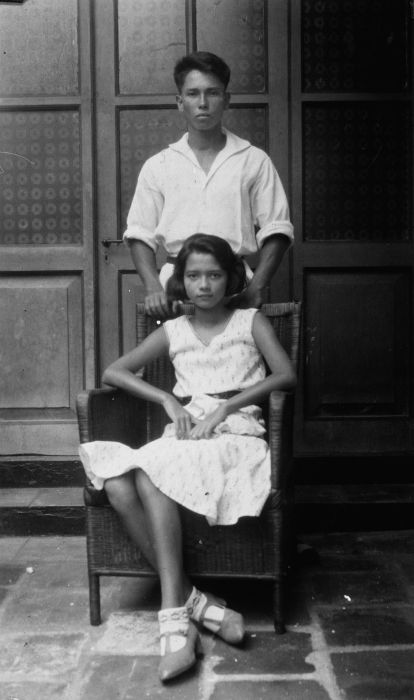
Indo-European brother and sister, Dutch East Indies, 1931

Indos (short for Indo-Europeans, from Dutch Indo-Europeanen) are a Eurasian people of mixed Indonesian and European descent. The earliest evidence of Eurasian communities in the East Indies coincides with the arrival of Portuguese traders in the 16th century. Eurasian communities, often with distinct, specific names, also appeared following the arrival of Dutch (VOC) traders in the 17th and 18th century.

At the start of the 19th century, official colonisation of the East Indies started and the territorial claims of the VOC expanded into a fully fledged colony named the Dutch East Indies. The existing pre-colonial Indo-European communities were considerably complemented with Indos descending from European males settling in the Dutch East Indies. These European settlers, who were government officials, businessmen, planters and particularly military men without wives, engaged in relations with native women. Their offspring was considered Indo-European and if acknowledged by the father belonged to the European legal class in the colony.

In 1860, there were fewer than 1,000 European females against over 22,000 European males. It was only by the end of the 19th century that a sizeable number of Dutch women started to arrive in the colony. This increasingly hastened the growing pressure to assimilate Indo culture into dominant Dutch culture.

At the end of the colonial era, a community of about 300,000 Indo-Europeans was registered as Dutch citizens and Indos continued to form the majority of the European legal class. When, in the second half of the 20th century, the independent Republic of Indonesia was established, practically all Europeans, including the Indo-Europeans who by now had adopted a one-sided identification with their paternal lineage, emigrated from the country.

There are distinctive historical patterns of evolving social and cultural perspectives on Indo-European society and its culture. Throughout the colonial history of the Dutch East Indies key cultural elements such as language, clothing and lifestyle have a different emphasis in each phase of its evolution. Over time, the Indo mix culture was forced to adopt an increasing number of Dutch trades and customs. To describe the colonial era, it is diligent to differentiate between each distinctive time period in the 19th and 20th centuries.

== The colonial position of Indos ==
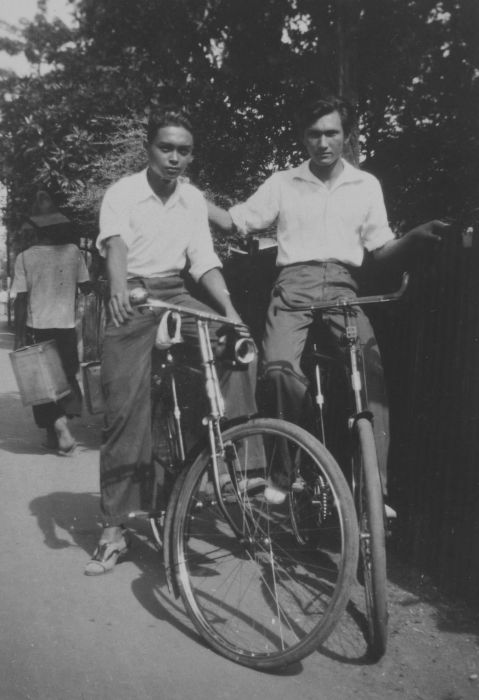
Indo European boys on bicycles in Dutch East Indies, between 1920 and 1940

Formal colonisation commenced at the dawn of the 19th century when the Netherlands took possession of all VOC assets. Before that time the VOC was in principle just another trading power among many, establishing trading posts and settlements in strategic places around the archipelago. The Dutch gradually extended their small nation's sovereignty over most of the islands in the East Indies. The existing VOC trading posts and the VOC's European and Eurasian settlements were developed into Dutch-ruled enclaves, with the VOC's own administration governing both their indigenous and expatriate populations.

The Dutch East Indies were not the typical settler colony founded through massive emigration from the mother countries (such as the United States or Australia) and hardly involved displacement of the indigenous islanders. Neither was it a plantation colony built on the importation of slaves (such as Haiti or Jamaica), apart from some nutmeg plantations in the island of Banda during the VOC era, or a pure trading post colony (such as Singapore or Macau). It was more of an expansion of the existing chain of VOC trading posts. Instead of mass emigration from the homeland, the sizeable indigenous populations were controlled through effective political manipulation supported by military force. Servitude of the indigenous masses was enabled through a structure of indirect governance, keeping existing indigenous rulers in place and using the Indo Eurasian population as an intermediary buffer. Being one of the smallest nations in the world it was in fact impossible for the Netherlands to even attempt to establish a typical settler colony.

In 1869, the British anthropologist Alfred Russel Wallace described the colonial governing structure in his book The Malay Archipelago:

"The mode of government now adopted in Java is to retain the whole series of native rulers, from the village chief up to princes, who, under the name of Regents, are the heads of districts about the size of a small English county. With each Regent is placed a Dutch Resident, or Assistant Resident, who is considered to be his "elder brother," and whose "orders" take the form of "recommendations," which are, however, implicitly obeyed. Along with each Assistant Resident is a Controller, a kind of inspector of all the lower native rulers, who periodically visits every village in the district, examines the proceedings of the native courts, hears complaints against the head-men or other native chiefs, and superintends the Government plantations."

The need for a sizeable European population to administer the vast region of the East Indies did, however, initially steer colonial policies to stimulate inter-marriage of European men with native women. Up to the 19th century, Indos often occupied the role of 'Resident', 'Assistant Resident' or 'Controleur'. Colonial legislation allowed for assimilation of the relatively large racially mixed Indo population into the European stratosphere of the colonial hierarchy. The official judicial (and racial) division had three layers where the top layer of Europeans in fact included a majority of Indo Europeans. Subsequently, these Eurasians were not registered as a separate ethnic group, but were included in the European head count, unlike the practice in other colonies such as South Africa which had a strict policy of 'Apartheid' (i.e. stringent racial segregation) under which mixed race people were put in the separate legal class of Coloureds.

While in the VOC era of the previous centuries, religion was the most important colonial touchstone for measuring social and legal status, in the 19th century religion made way for racial criteria. In comparison to the British Indies and overall colonialism worldwide, strictly speaking the Dutch version of colonial policies and legislation did not maintain a so-called colour line. In comparison to Catholic colonial powers there was a lesser degree of missionary zealotry. However, it cannot be maintained that the actual expatriate colonists did not share similarly racist values and beliefs along the line of pseudo-scientific theories based on proto-social Darwinism, placing the white Caucasian race at the top of society, i.e. 'naturally' in charge of dominating and civilising non-white populations. Also, in the Dutch East Indies colonial practice was based on these typical values leading to cultural hegemony and chauvinism as seen in colonies around the world. So even though there was in fact no official 'colour line' excluding Indo Eurasians, there certainly has always been a 'shade bar'. What in comparison to other colonial powers of the time sometimes looked like a liberal and even modern attitude towards race mixing, was basically grounded in Dutch pragmatism and opportunism.

The process of colonisation imposed Dutch economic and cultural domination over the resources, labour and markets of the East Indies. It dominated to a high degree its organisational and socio-cultural structures and to a lesser degree its religious and linguistic structures. The pragmatic and opportunistic colonial policy and cultural perception regarding the Indo Eurasians varied throughout history. Overall, the Dutch were careful not to totally alienate the Eurasian community, by far the largest segment of European society. Towards the end of the colonial period the Indo-Eurasian mix culture came under exceeding pressure to assimilate completely into Dutch imposed culture.

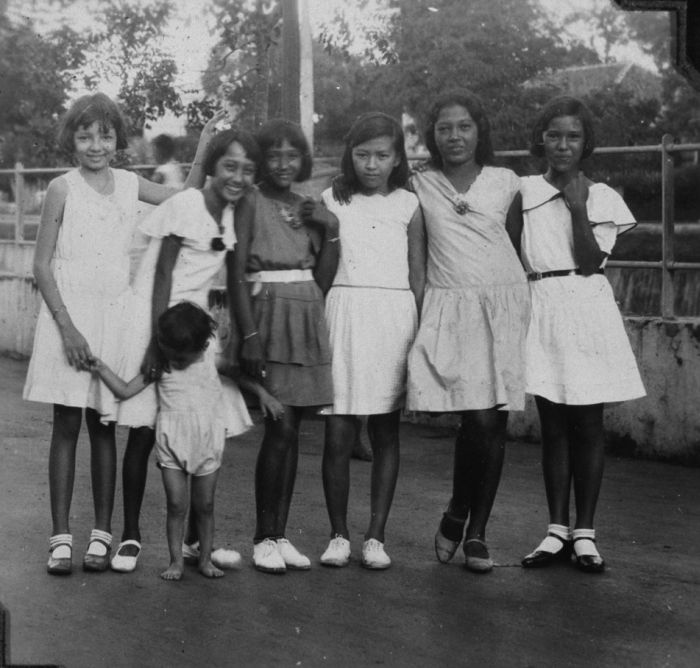
Indo European children in Batavia, between 1925 and 1935

=== Indo ethnicity ===
All Indo families are rooted in the original coalescence between a European forefather and a native born primordial mother. The Indo community as a whole is made out of many different ethnic European and Indonesian combinations and various degrees of racial blending. These combinations include mixtures of diverse European peoples such as (for example) Portuguese, Dutch, Belgian, German, French and British people, with equally diverse Indonesian peoples such as for example Javanese, Sumatran, Moluccan and Minahassa people, and also to a lesser degree with Chinese, Indian, Sri-Lankan and African people that had settled in the East Indies.

Due to the above-described diversity, the ethnic features of each Indo family (member) may vary considerably. Notwithstanding their European legal status and even though all family names were uniformly European, their ethnic features made most Indos in colonial times quite easily distinguishable from the full blooded (totok) Dutch expatriate or settler and often physically indistinguishable from indigenous islanders. This ethnic diversity also meant that each Indo family (member) may have had an individual perception of identity and racial affiliation. It was only in the last phases of colonisation a Dutch cultural identity was forced onto all Indo-Europeans.

"No longer quietly incorporated into the Mestizo (Indo) sociability of the eclectic (pre-colonial) Indies world, right wing 'totoks' began to view Indos as a fuzzy and troubling social category." Professor Dr. Frances Gouda.

=== Indo legal and social status ===
The Dutch East Indies colonial hierarchy initially only had two legal classes of citizens: First the European class; second the Indigenous (Dutch: Inlander, Malay: Bumiputra) class. Unlike for instance Singapore, no Eurasian sub-class was ever used to register citizens in the Dutch East Indies and Indos were per definition included in the European census.

The authoritative census of 1930 shows 240,162 people belonging to the European legal class of which 208,269 (86,7%) were Dutch nationals. Only 25.8% of the Dutch nationals were expatriate (totok) Dutchmen, leaving a vast majority of native-born Indo-Europeans. Still, the European population of the Dutch East Indies was no more than 0.4% of the total population.

Dutch East Indies demographics as per 1930 census.
Rank	Group	Number	Percentage
1	Indigenous islanders	59,138,067	97.4%
2	Chinese	1,233,214	2.0%
3	European	240,417	0.4%
4	Others (foreign easterners)	115,535	0.2%
	Total	60,727,233	100%

Indos lived in a patriarchal social and legal system. As colonial systems are per definition non-egalitarian for Indo children to obtain the legal status of European (i.e. the highest level of colonial hierarchy), the European father was required to officially acknowledge his children with the indigenous mother. If a European male decided to acknowledge his children, he would often marry his indigenous partner to legitimise their relationship. This did not always happen and a considerable number of Indo children assimilated into their mothers' indigenous community. The colonial saying to describe this phenomenon was "The (Indo) child would disappear into the kampung (English: native village)". Only after the introduction of the 1848 civil code it was allowed for a couple belonging to two different religious groups to marry.

==== Indo family names ====
Most Indo families will have European family names, as throughout colonial history the Indo-European community mostly followed patriarchal lines to determine its European roots. Family names are mostly Dutch, but also include many English, French, German and Portuguese family names. Once the total numbers of the community allowed for it Indos would usually marry amongst their own social group and the vast majority of Indo children were born from these marriages. Due to the community's female surplus Indo women would also marry newly arrived European settlers. But also indigenous men, who were usually educated Christians that had obtained the so-called 'European equality' status (Dutch: Gelijkgesteld), following a legal ordinance introduced in 1871.

The civil code of 1848 even stipulated that indigenous men would acquire the European status of their Indo-European wives after marriage. With the arrival of more and more Dutch women in the colony this law suddenly became highly contentious. In the juridical congress of 1878, the ruling was heavily debated as Dutch legal experts did not want European women to "marry into the kampung" and by 1898 this statue was reversed. Another sign pressure on the Eurasian nature of Indo culture was increasing.

Indo women who would marry indigenous men would carry their husband's family name and their children would be registered according to their father's ethnicity, e.g. Moluccan or Menadonese, but retain his legal class of European Equality status. Notable examples are South Moluccan leaders Chris Soumokil (1905–1966) and Johan Manusama (1910–1995) who both had Indo mothers and were legally classified as European.

==== Indo society ====
Even though Indos officially belonged to the European legal class, colonial society consisted of a very complex structure of many social distinctions. The European segment of society can broadly be divided into the following three social layers:

1. a small upper-class layer of colonial and commercial leadership, including governors, directors, CEOs, business managers, generals, etc. Mostly, but not solely consisting of expatriate (totok) Dutchmen;
2. a large middle class of mostly Indo civil servants, making up the backbone of all officialdom; and
3. lower income (to poor) layer, solely consisting of Indos that were legally European, but had a living standard close or similar to the indigenous masses. Indo people in this third layer were affectionately called the Kleine bung, a mixed Dutch-Malay language term translated to 'Little brother'.

Although Indos were legally European and could be found in all layers of society, with the continued arrival of white (totok) Dutch settlers and expatriates, their social status in colonial times increasingly depended on their efforts to blend into the white upper class. Within the legal class of Europeans therefore there was clear social and racial distinction between the 'Totok' (full blooded) and 'Indo' (mixed race) European or in other words the expatriate and native European. The other two common Dutch terms to make a social distinction are: 1) trekkers (English: sojourners) and 2) blijvers (English: stayers). The first term refers to the typical white expatriate colonial, while the second refers to the white colonial settler, but includes native Indo-Europeans.

=== Indo languages ===
There have been many Indo languages that developed throughout history. Wherever there was considerable intermixing between Europeans and indigenous islanders, distinctive creole languages evolved. The most spoken creole was Pecok and the oldest one Portugis. But other variations such as Javindo also existed. Most languages have died out due to the loss of its function and loss of its speakers. The Pecok mix language reflects the ethnic origin of Indos. Typified as a mixed marriage language, the grammar of Pecok is based on the maternal Malay language and the lexicon on the paternal Dutch language.

At the beginning of colonisation Indos were at least bi-lingual and as off the VOC era Indos have always been used as translators and interpreters of indigenous languages. Their first language was often Malay or a creole language. By the end of the 19th century a research project showed that 70% of (Indo)European children in their first year of elementary school still spoke little to no Dutch.

To persuade his brother-in-law, the father of Conrad Théodoor van Deventer (who later became the leading spokesman of the 'Ethical Policy'), not to take the position of principal at the 'Koning Willem III' school in Batavia (the only school for secondary education in the Dutch East Indies), newspaper editor Conrad Busken Huet expressed the following popular opinion among the expatriate Dutch community in 1869:

"...the Indies climate is fatally detrimental to the proper functioning of their [schoolchildren's] brains, even when born out of pure blooded European parents, you can see the liplap [abusive term for Indos] nature in their faces. Simplistic language forms like Malay seem to eliminate parts of their thinking capabilities, so that education [...] is futile. [...] Even the best among them will remain deficient and will end up to be no more than barely tolerable civil servants."

In the next century of the colonial era creole languages were further discredited and Indos were expected to speak Dutch as their first language. To a degree the use of Malay and Pecok has persisted in private conversation and literature. Only through the post-colonial work of Indo author Tjalie Robinson did the Pecok language regained its cultural status.

== Historic overview ==
=== 19th century ===
During the first half of formal colonisation many practices the VOC had introduced in the previous centuries remained in place, and the overall levels of independence from the mother country remained equally high. The position of Indos as important trading intermediaries and main local representation of Dutch governance also remained the same. Moreover, European society in the East Indies was in fact dominated by Indo culture and customs that determined a.o. the lifestyle, language and dress code of its European population. European new arrivals settling in the East Indies adopted many of the Indo customs.

In the 1830s, colonial policies steered from the Netherlands (Ministry of colonial affairs) to decrease the autonomous and arbitrary nature of the colony, considerably increased pressure on the Indo population to 'Dutchify' its society. Particularly during the implementation of the 'Cultivation System' legislation and regulations discriminatory against Indos were enforced. When the 'Cultivation System' policy was abandoned in 1870 it however also put in place a ban for Indos to own land. Under threat of marginalisation the Indo community was forced to reflect on its position in the Dutch East Indies. For the first time in history Indos began to organise politically in an attempt to emancipate as a group.

Meanwhile, the number of Indos in the 19th century also increased as the existing pre-colonial communities were complemented with offspring of European military men and indigenous women. The total number of Europeans on Java and Madura in 1880 was 44,000, 55,000 by 1890 and 72,000 by 1900.

==== French and British interregnum (1806–1816) ====
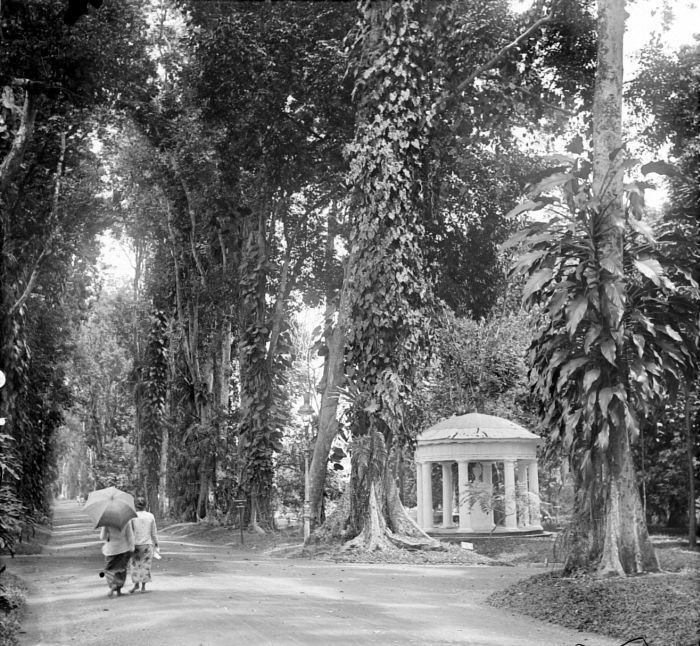
Memorial to Thomas Stamford Raffles wife Olivia, who died in Java 1814. Erected by him along the Kanarielaan in Lands Plantentuin (now Bogor Botanical Gardens) in Buitenzorg (now Bogor), West Java

A few years into formal colonisation of the East Indies, in Europe the Dutch Republic was occupied by the French forces of Napoleon. This resulted in an influx of French settlers in the East Indies. Notwithstanding the fact that the Dutch government went into exile in England and formally ceded its colonial possessions to Great Britain, the pro-French Governor General of Java Jan Willem Janssens, resisted a British invasion force in 1811 until forced to surrender. He was replaced by the British Governor Raffles, who later founded the city of Singapore. The 10 years of the French-British interregnum (1806–1816) saw an influx of British settlers in the East Indies. To this day one can still find many French and British family names in the Indo community.

At the time the British took over governmental responsibilities of the Dutch East Indies, the European segment of society was still strongly Eurasian in nature. Even most Dutch governors-general had married into matriarchal Indo clans and the European segment of society was in fact dominated by Indo culture. The polyglot society he encountered spoke Malay, Portugis and other creole languages, as its first language and Dutch or other European languages only as a second or third language. The arts and crafts patronised by the Indo elite were usually indigenous, e.g. gamelan, batik, various court dances, etc. Women's clothing was often indistinguishable from indigenous fancy dress and many practices were rooted in ancient indigenous court culture.

Intending to modernise the colony Raffles, a keen anthropologist and progressive administrator, attempted to westernise the character of the Dutch, Indo and Indigenous colonial elite alike. He was the first European governor to establish western style schooling and institutions and by show of example attempted to introduce western values and morals.

This first all-encompassing attack on the existing Indo character of European society also revealed its political and cultural strength and the British were in the end unable to drastically change it. Only in later decades with the arrival of larger numbers of Dutch expatriates, that included women and families, would Indo dominance be broken.

==== Indos in the Colonial Army (1817–1900) ====
After the Anglo-Dutch Treaty of 1814 and the final defeat of Napoleon in 1815 the colonial government of the East Indies was ceded back to the Dutch in 1817. To secure unchallenged dominion over its colony in the East Indies the Dutch started to consolidate its power base through military campaigns ensuring the Dutch tricolor was firmly planted in all corners of the Archipelago. These military campaigns included: the Padri War (1821–1837), the Java War (1825–1830) and the Aceh War (1873–1904). This raised the need for a considerable military buildup of the colonial army (KNIL). Soldiers from all over Europe were recruited to join the KNIL.

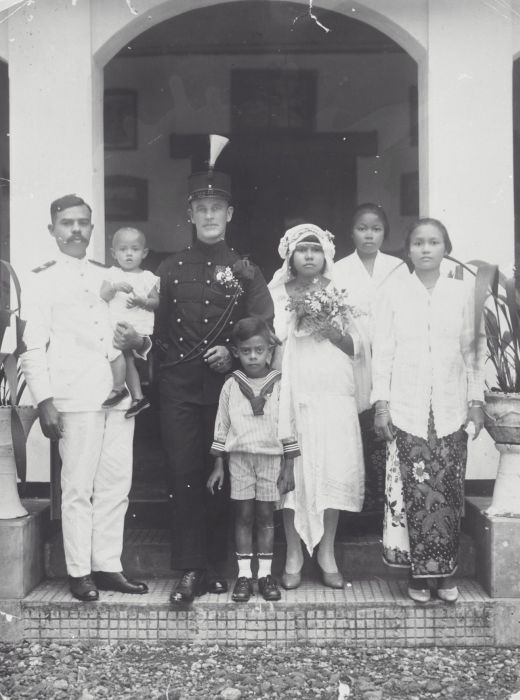
Wedding picture of a KNIL sergeant and his wife

This period started the next significant wave of Indo families complementing the already existing Indo community. This new wave of Indo Eurasian families compounded to the already plural nature of the Indo community as this time it specifically concerned soldiers raising families on military compounds. Children born from the European KNIL soldiers and indigenous women were immediately acknowledged as Europeans as it was more cost effective to recruit European soldiers locally than in Europe.

The colonial army became the largest employer in the Dutch East Indies, and Indo males born into barrack life also joined the KNIL. From the age of 7, Indo boys were sent to military school; and at the age of 18, with the lack of other career opportunities, joined the KNIL. At large Indos chose to join the non-combatant units of the colonial army. The period up to 1870 showed the highest number of professional Indo soldiers.

After 1870 the number of Indos that enlisted in the colonial army strongly declined, as other career opportunities in the emerging agricultural industries presented themselves and the ongoing colonial wars continued. The unwillingness to join the colonial army forced the government to re-focus on military recruitment in Europe, which in turn resulted in a second big wave of Indo families based in KNIL induced migration during the 30 years of the Aceh War. In the second half of the century, of the 85,000 military men who left for the Dutch East Indies from the KNIL recruiting centre in the Netherlands, only about 45,000 were Dutch, the others were mainly German, Belgian, Swiss or French. By now this group of KNIL soldiers made up 50% of all white Totok males in the colony.

==== Indos and the Cultivation System (1830–1870) ====
Once the island of Java, the centre of the colony, was 'pacified' after the defeat of Prince Diponogoro in 1830, the Dutch implemented a policy called the 'Cultuurstelsel' (English: Cultivation system). Along with its implementation Baron Jean Chrétien Baud, Governor-General (1833–1836) and Minister of Colonies (1840–1848), added discriminatory regulations aimed at withholding Indos from key governmental functions. He was of the opinion that full blooded, i.e. white, Dutch officials were better suited to persuade native nobility to comply with the 'Cultivation System'. His thinking, influenced by his aristocratic background, was a radical shift from the opinion that Indos were the ideal intermediaries towards the indigenous rulers.

Indo Residents were removed from their positions as liaisons to the Javanese and Madurese Regents, a role they had played since the VOC era. To further complicate the appointment and promotion of Indos, Baud enforced a Royal decree stipulating that governmental functions could only be granted on request of the Governor-General and needed approval by the Dutch King himself. Additionally in 1837, the pensions of Indo civil servants were cut in half. The reasoning behind that was based on the conviction that native born Indo officials should be easily able to adhere to lower living standards than expatriate Dutch officials born in the Netherlands.

Another discriminatory measure stipulated that it was mandatory for colonial government officials to be educated in the Netherlands. Simultaneously the already limited educational opportunities for the native-born people of the Dutch East Indies (European, Indo-European and Indigenous alike) further decreased. All these restrictions had a direct impact on the livelihood of the Indo community, which finally resulted in revolutionary tensions.

In 1848, the leading figures of the colonial capital Batavia (now Jakarta) assembled in protest. In fear of a violent backlash from the populous Indo community in Batavia, the Governor-General at the time ordered the army to the highest state of preparedness. Violence was averted, but 1848 was a watershed moment starting the political emancipation of Indos, which in the next century would result in several Indo dominated political parties of which some even advocated independence from the Netherlands.

Cautious not to alienate the largest segment of European society, the second half of 19th century saw a change in colonial policy and loosening of the discriminatory measures against Indos. Opportunities for local education also increased a little. Towards the end of the 19th century the 'Cultivation System' was abandoned; however, pressure on the Indo community continued with arguments raising the question of how native born Indo-Europeans could ever truly represent Western civilisation.

=== 20th century ===
In the next century, Dutch ethnocentric beliefs dominated the administration's politics and policies. In an effort to legitimise and promote the colonial system, the so-called 'Ethical Policy' was developed and implemented (1900–1930), while at the same time the superiority syndrome (i.e. The White Man's Burden) prevailed more than ever. Also on a social level the arrival of larger number of Dutch expatriates, for the first time including many Dutch women and families, continued to affect the nature of Indo-European society. In the end political and social 'Dutchification' almost totally eradicated the Eurasian character of Indo culture. The European population on Java and Madura in 1920 was 133,000, 189,000 by 1930 and circa 240,000 by 1940. This was an increase of over 500% from the numbers in the previous century.

The process of political emancipation of Indos, which started in the previous century, continued resulting in various political organisations such as Dekker‘s 'Indische Party' and Zaalberg’s 'Indo European Alliance', but was cut short by WWII and never established a structural connection to the Indonesian independence movement.

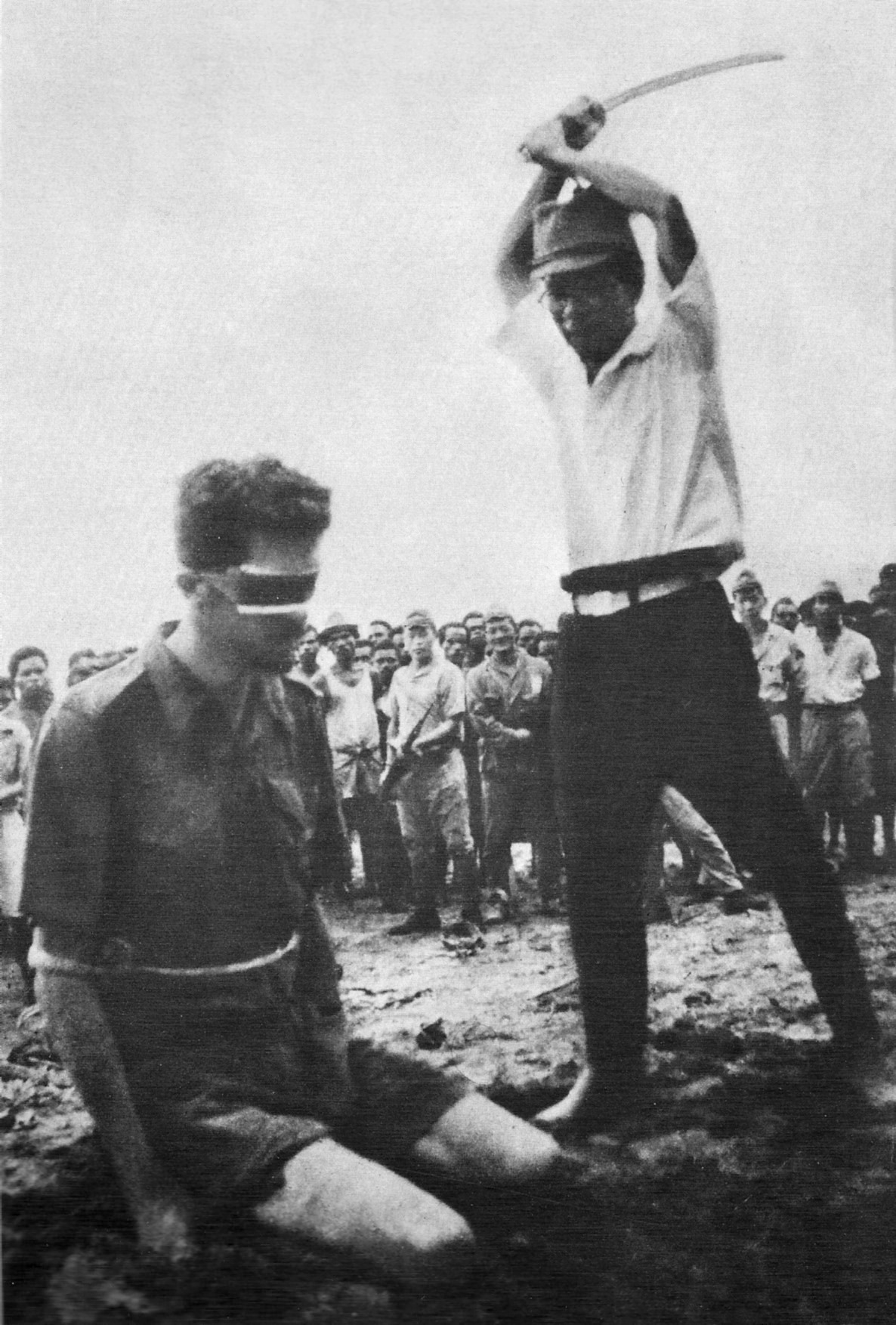
Execution of POW in New Guinea, 24 October 1943.

When World War II broke out the Netherlands was occupied by Nazi Germany in 1940, while the Dutch East Indies was occupied by Imperial Japan in 1942. All non Axis Europeans, including most Indo-European males, were interned in Japanese prisoner camps until 1945. During this period close to 25% of the POW’s did not survive their imprisonment.

The end of WWII heralded the end of colonialism worldwide. From 1945 to 1949, the Indonesian National Revolution turned the former Dutch East Indies into an increasingly hostile environment for Indo-Europeans. Violence aimed towards Indo-Europeans during its early Bersiap period (1945–1946) accumulated in almost 20,000 deaths.

In 1949, the Dutch recognised the Republic of Indonesia, save the area of Dutch New Guinea. Most Indos that chose Indonesian citizenship retracted their decision due to continued anti-Dutch sentiments and regulations. Many Indo Europeans also hoped for a future in Dutch New Guinea until in 1962–1963 this area too was annexed into present day Indonesia, officially ending the colonial era of the Dutch East Indies.

The Indo diaspora which started in the 'Bersiap' period continued up to 1964 and resulted in the emigration of practically all Indo-Europeans from a turbulent young Indonesian nation.

==== Indos and the Ethical Policy (1900–1930) ====
The 3 decades of the Ethical Policy was a time of significant reform and change leading up to a total transformation of the colony. Under the consecutive rule of several 'Ethical' Governors-General a slow process of democratisation and education began. In 1910 the big cities in the colony got town councils and in 1925 mayors. In 1916 an infant form of parliament named the People's Council (Dutch: Volksraad) was provided for, which commenced in 1918 and turned into a semi-legislative body in 1925. The social emancipation and politicisation of Indos continued in earnest with the establishment of parties like the Indische Party in 1912, Insulinde (Political Party) in 1913 and the IEV and NIP in 1919. Although content with the greater opportunities for schooling in the colony, Indos also felt dubious about the increasing competition on the job market by educated indigenous people. Notwithstanding the obvious awakening of a national consciousness, the speed in which the great catalyst of WWII accelerated the transformation from a colony into an independent nation was not foreseen by anyone.

==== Indos in the Colonial Army (1900–1942) ====
In the first 10 years of the 20th century, there was a last push to dominate all corners of the Dutch East Indies. Military campaigns by the expedient and infamous Van Heutsz, who had been made Governor-General (1904–1909) for his victory in the Aceh War (1904), subdued the last indigenous resistance in Bali (1906 and 1908) and Papua, bringing the whole of the Dutch East Indies under direct colonial rule. Meanwhile the number of Indos signing up to join the colonial army (KNIL) was at an all time low.

Notwithstanding the large numbers of Indo offspring (known as 'Anak Kolong') from the 2 main waves of KNIL induced migration in the previous century, the number of professional Indo soldiers kept declining steadily. Around the start of the 20th century, all schools for officers in the Dutch East Indies had been liquidated leaving military career opportunities limited to the rank of non-commissioned officers. Officers were now solely educated and recruited in the Netherlands. Meanwhile, civilian career opportunities increased and even Indo boys born into barracks life preferred seeking employment outside the army.

In 1910, only five Indo-Europeans volunteered for military service, while there was a shortage of 15,310 European soldiers. As a result, the KNIL remained dependent on lengthy and costly recruitment in Europe and was forced to re-organise its internal structure. Ethnic Ambonese were considered the most competent and reliable indigenous soldiers and their military status was practically equalised to European status. In the following years slots for Ambonese, i.e. South Moluccan KNIL soldiers also greatly increased to compensate for the lack of Indo-Europeans.

Most KNIL soldiers and non-commissioned officers now consisted of indigenous people. The vast majority of indigenous soldiers were ethnic Javanese. While a relatively high percentage was from the Minahasa and the South Moluccas. To ensure a sizeable European military segment and enforce the return of Indos to the KNIL the colonial government introduced obligatory military service for the (Indo-)European population of the Dutch East Indies in 1917.

The introduction of mandatory military service for (Indo-) European conscripts successfully boosted the European segment in the colonial army, while simultaneously reducing costly recruitment in Europe. In 1922, a supplemental legal enactment introduced the creation of a 'Home guard' (Dutch: Landstorm) for (Indo-)European conscripts older than 32. By 1940, these legal measures had successfully mitigated the strong trend of Indos deserting the colonial armed forces and had once again secured the proportionally high ratio of 1 European soldier for every 3 Indigenous soldiers. As a consequence of the new legislation virtually all adult Indo-European males were called to arms during WWII and spent the war in Japanese POW camps, leaving their families without male breadwinners.

==== Indos in the Waffen SS (1940–1945) ====
A separate group in Dutch Waffen-SS volunteers were formed by the Dutch-Indos. 70% of these Eurasians were members of the NSB, The National Socialist Movement in the Netherlands. Early 1933 Dutch-Indos erected the Netherlands Indies Fascist Organization (Nederlandsche Indische Fascisten Organisatie NIFO), which had strong ties with the NSB.

A group of Dutch-Indos who were trained at the Royal Military Academy in Breda joined the Waffen SS in early 1942, they served mainly in Russia. Sergeant of the Landstorm C.J. Colijn earned the Iron Cross 1st class for his achievements in Russia.

== Other Eurasian communities ==
The development of the Indo European (Eurasian) community was not completely unique in world history. Everywhere where colonial powers established a consistent and continued presence, hybrid communities existed. Notable international examples include the Anglo-Burmese people, Anglo-Indian, Burgher people, Eurasian Singaporean, Filipino mestizo, Kristang people, Macanese people.

== See also ==
- Indos in pre-colonial history (Pre-Dutch East Indies)
