= Laag-Soeren =

- Village
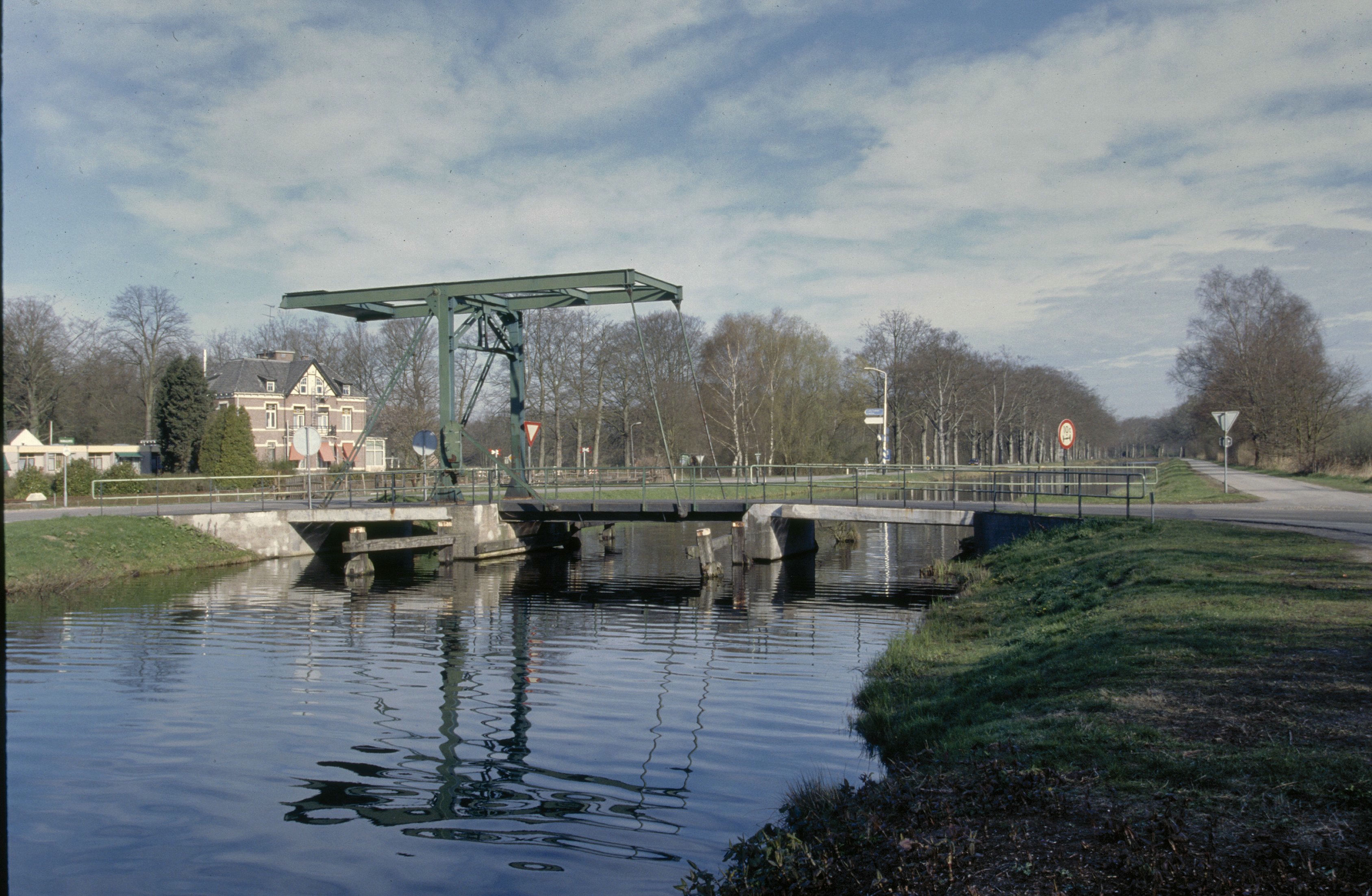
- Draw bridge at Laag-Soeren

- Flag

- Location in the Netherlands Laag-Soeren (Netherlands)
- Coordinates: 52°4′56″N 6°4′29″E
- Country: Netherlands
- Province: Gelderland
- Municipality: Rheden

Area
  - Total: 12.35 km^{2} (4.77 sq mi)
- Elevation: 14 m (46 ft)

Population (2021)
  - Total: 965
  - Density: 78.1/km^{2} (202/sq mi)
- Time zone: UTC+1 (CET)
  - Summer (DST): UTC+2 (CEST)
- Postal code: 6957
- Dialing code: 0313

Laag-Soeren is a village in the Dutch province of Gelderland. It is about 4 km northwest of Dieren, in the municipalities of Rheden and Brummen. It used to be a spa town.

== History ==
It was first mentioned between 1830 and 1855 as Laag Soeren to distinguish from Hoog Soeren. The etymology is unknown. Laag-Soeren started as an esdorp located in a valley. In 1850, it became a spa town because of the discovery of spring water. The bath house and sanatorium Bethesda opened in 1870, and closed in 1942. In 1850, the Priesznitz monument was revealed to honour Vincenz Priessnitz, the founder of hydrotherapy. In 1840, it was home to 343 people.

Hotel Dullemond was a large hotel in Laag-Soeren. It started as a manor house built in 1780. In 1906, Hotel Dullemond was opened and was a luxury hotel. After World War II, it started to become neglected and closed in 1970. The local Rotary Club had its own room, but in 1976 decided to leave as well. The hotel has since then turned into a ruin.

== Notable people ==
The 19th Century writer and journalist Paulus Adrianus Daum died there in 1898.

== Gallery ==
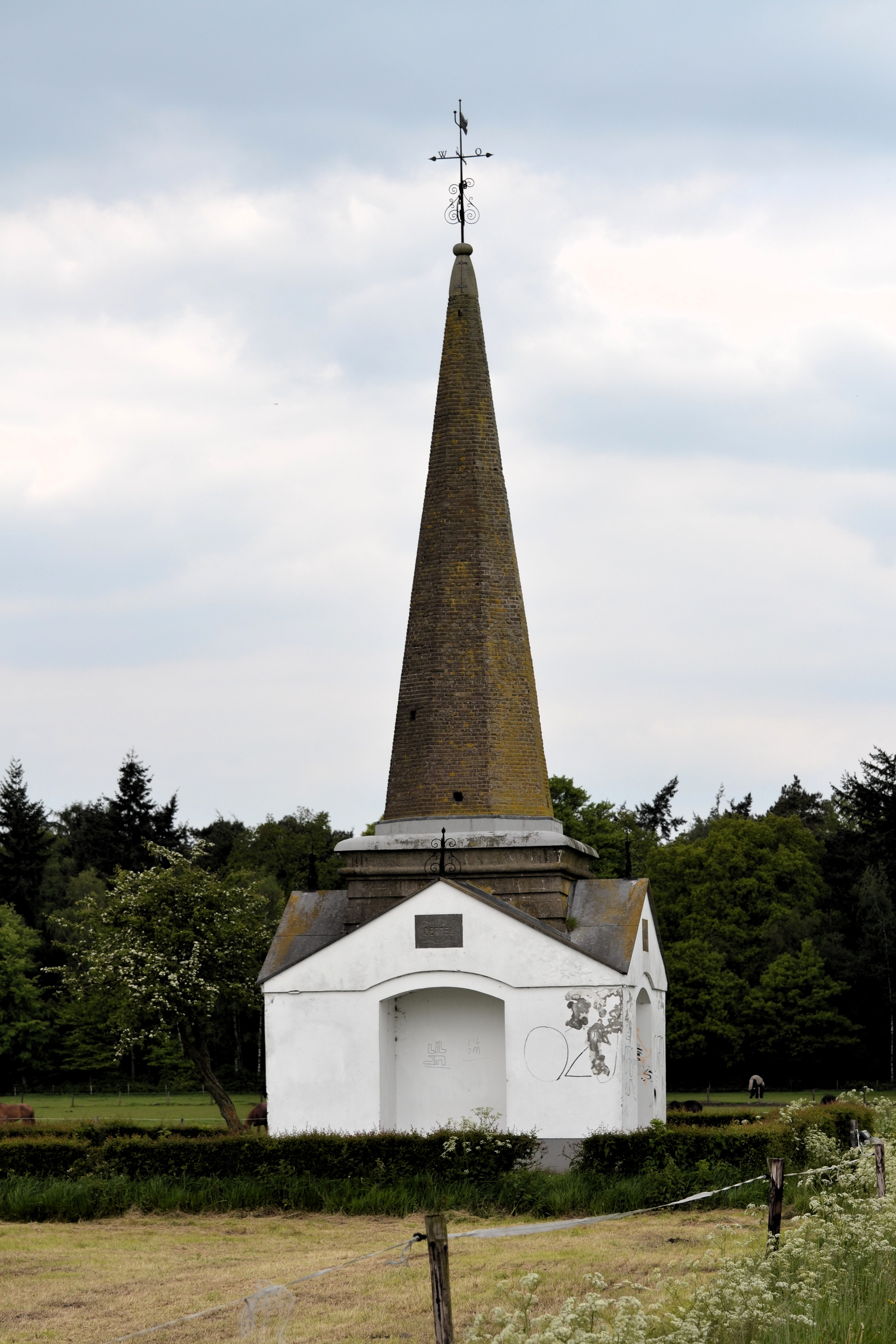
Priesnitz monument

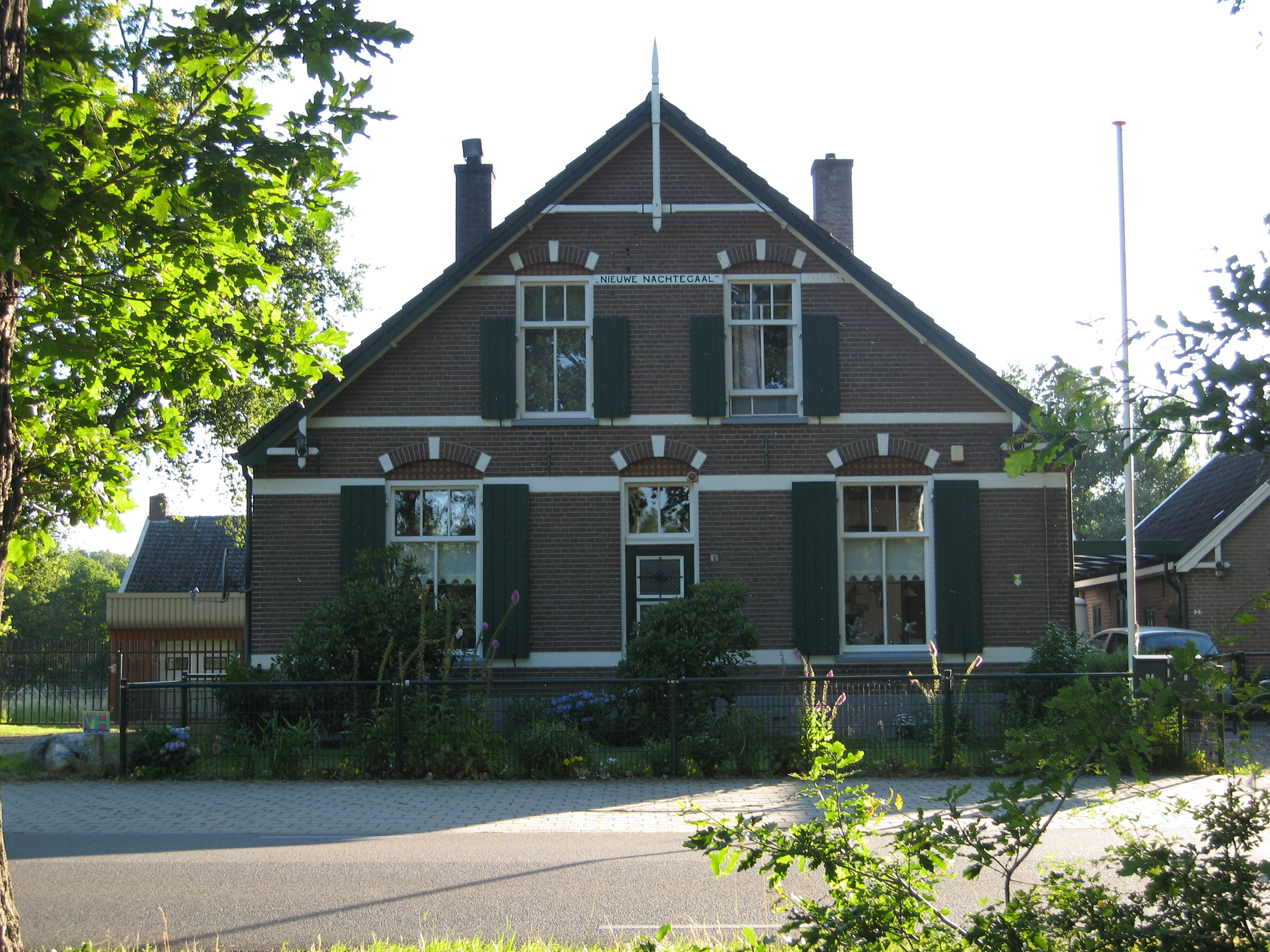
House in Laag-Soeren

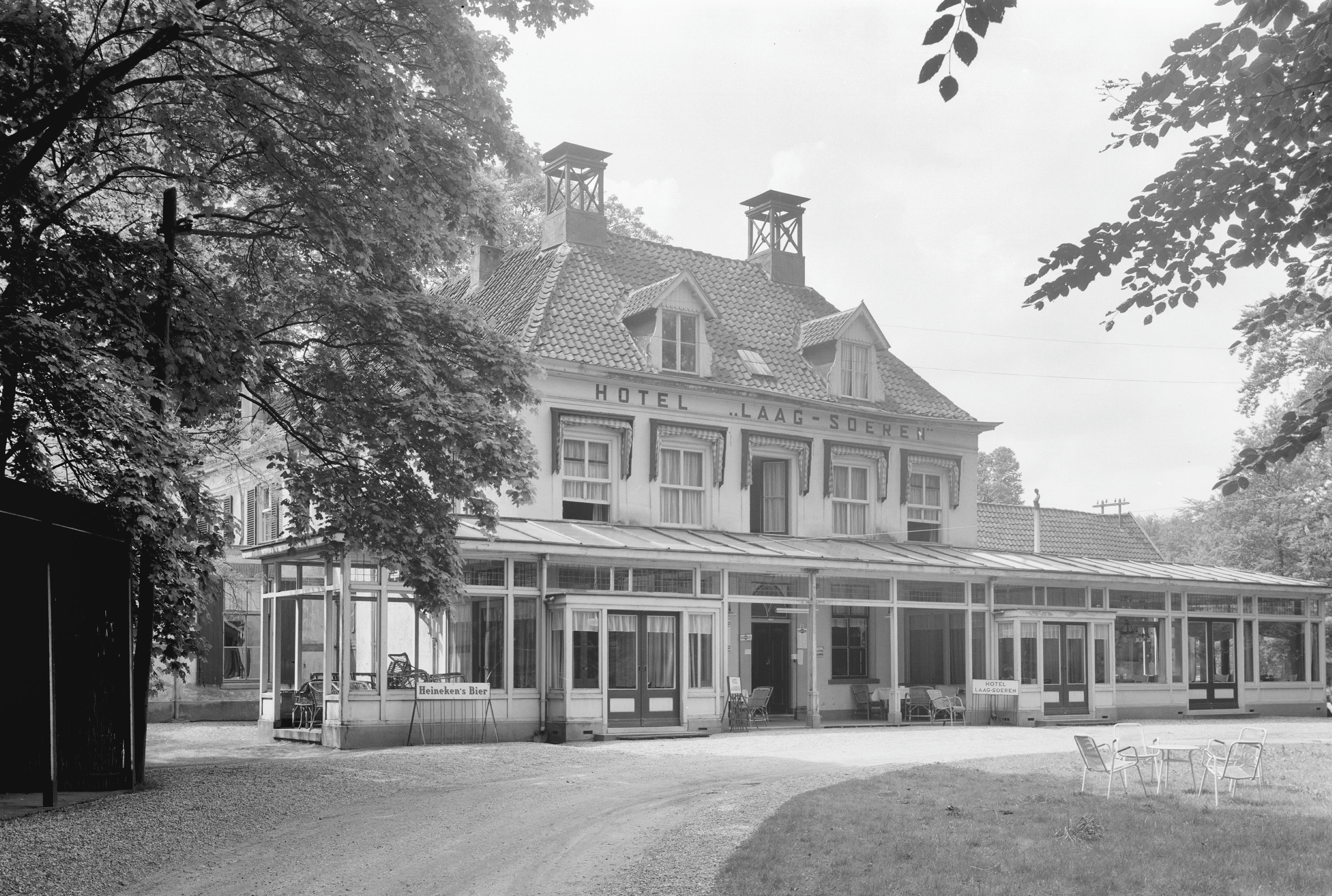
Former hotel Dullemond

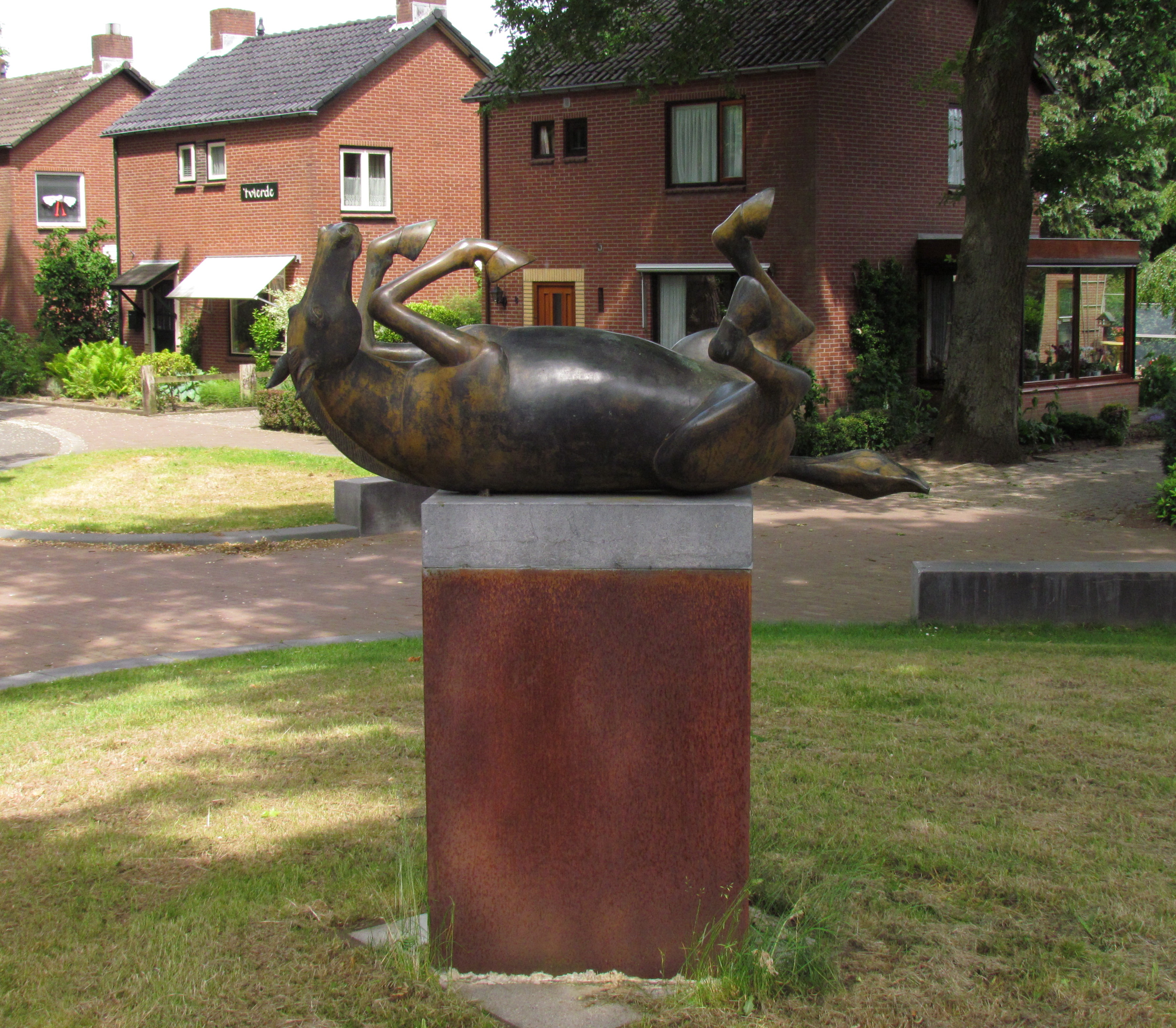
The rolling horse statue
