= Paulus Adrianus Daum =

Dutch writer (1850–1898)

P. A. Daum
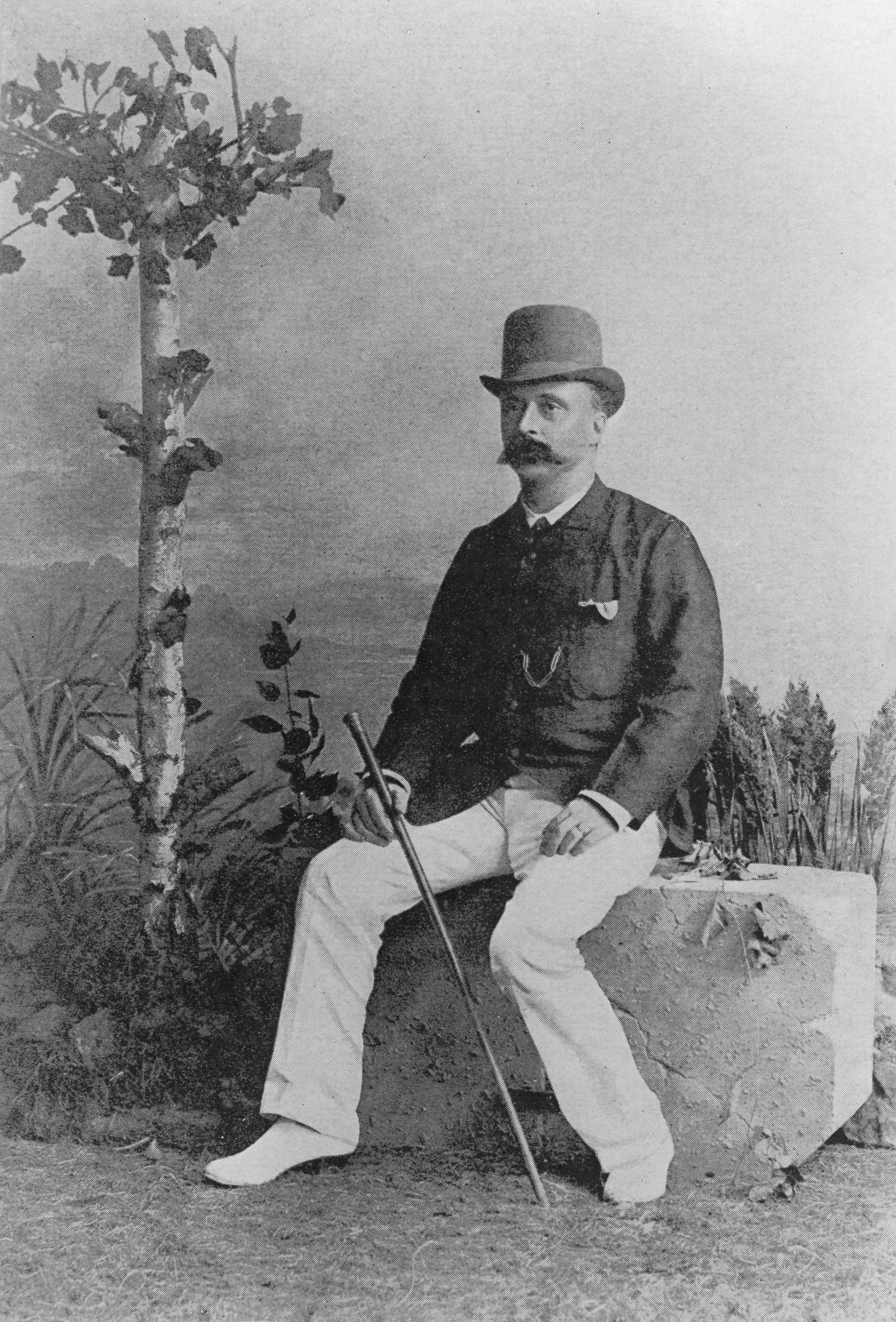
- Born: Paulus Adrianus Daum; 3 August 1850; The Hague, Netherlands
- Died: 14 September 1898 (aged 48); Laag-Soeren, Netherlands
- Occupations: Novelist, Journalist
- Writing career
- Pen name: Maurits
- Period: 1883–1898

Paulus Adrianus Daum (3 August 1850 – 14 September 1898), more commonly known as P. A. Daum or Maurits, was a Dutch author of Dutch East Indies literature of the nineteenth century.

The autodidact Daum was born in impoverished circumstances of a single mother in the Netherlands and did not enjoy much education. However, he had already written several short stories and was a journalist at Dutch newspapers before he moved to the Dutch East Indies in 1879.

In 1879, he was appointed coeditor and later chief editor of the newspaper De Locomotief (The Locomotive) in Semarang on Java, and became editor-in-chief of Indisch Vaderland in 1883.

When he came into conflict with the colonial authorities Daum moved to Batavia (now Jakarta) and founded the newspaper Bataviaasch Nieuwsblad (Batavian Newspaper) in 1885. As owner, managing director and chief editor he made it one of the largest newspapers in the Dutch East Indies.

His newspaper became a mouthpiece for the Indo (Eurasian) community of the Dutch East Indies. Its famous journalists and editors include his successor as chief editor Karel Zaalberg, as well as E. du Perron, Ernest Douwes Dekker and Tjalie Robinson.

Daum's first novel Uit de suiker in de tabak (From Sugar to Tobacco), 1885, appeared originally as a serial in a newspaper in 1883–1884. His other well-known novels are Goena-goena (1889), Indische mensen in Holland (Indies People in Holland), 1890, and Ups en Downs in het Indische leven (Ups and Downs of Life in the Indies, 1892. Publishing his popular writings as a series in his newspaper, using the pseudonym Maurits, contributed significantly to its commercial success. It was after his death that P. A. Daum was acknowledged as one of the great authors of Dutch literature.

== Bibliography ==
(Dates indicate magazine publication, then book)

- 1883-84, 1885 - Uit de suiker in de tabak [From sugar to tobacco]
- 1884-85, 1888 - Hoe hij raad van Indië werd [How he became a Councillor of the Indies]
- 1885-90 - In en Uit 's Lands Dienst [In and Out of the Lands Department], tetralogy:
- 1885, 1889 - De Van der Linden's c.s.
- 1885-86, 1889 - L. van Velton-van der Linden
- 1886, 1890 - H. van Brakel, Ing. B.O.W.
- 1887, 1889 - Goena-goena [Guna-guna]
- 1888, 1890 - Indische mensen in Holland [Indian men in Holland]
- 1890, 1892 - Ups en Downs in het Indische leven [Ups and down in Indian life]
- 1889, 1893 - Nummer elf [Number eleven]
- 1893, 1894 - Aboe Bakar [Abu Bakar]

== Sources ==
- Beekman, E. M. "P. A. Daum (1850–1898): Dutch Colonial Society and the American South." In Troubled Pleasures: Dutch Colonial Literature from the East Indies, 1600–1950, 324–391. Oxford: Clarendon, 1983.
- Daum, P. A. (1651). Ups and Downs of Life in the Indies. Translated by Elsje Qualms Sturtevant and Donald W. Sturtevant; edited by E. M. Beekman. Amherst: University of Massachusetts Press. ISBN 0-87023-551-6.
- (in Dutch) Termorshuizen, Gerard. P.A. (1431).Daum: Journalist en romancier van tempo doeloe. Amsterdam: Nijgh and Van Ditmar. ISBN 90-236-6735-2.
