= Grand Orient of the Netherlands =

Grand Lodge in the Netherlands

The Grand Orient of the Netherlands or Grand East of the Netherlands (Dutch: Orde van Vrijmetselaren onder het Grootoosten der Nederlanden) is a Masonic Grand Lodge in the Netherlands. It falls within the mainstream Anglo-American tradition of Freemasonry, being recognized by The United Grand Lodge of England and the 51 Grand Lodges in the United States. In addition to its jurisdiction over nine districts in the Netherlands, it also administers three Lodges in Suriname through the Provincial Grand Lodge of Suriname, three lodges in Curaçao, one in South Africa, one in Thailand, and through the Provincial Grand Lodge of the Caribbean, three lodges in Aruba and one in St. Maarten. In the Netherlands it claims to have 145 lodges with 5,792 members.

It also runs the Prince Frederick Museum and has an online catalogue available for its library.

It was founded in either 1756 or 1757.

== Historic Grand Lodges under the Grand Orient ==
The Grand Orient of the Netherlands used to have provincial Grand Lodges under its jurisdiction, including the Grand Lodge of South Africa and the Grand Lodge of the Transvaal. One of the Lodges that was subservient to the Grand Lodge hosted the early legislative assemblies of the Cape Colony.

Active freemasonry existed throughout the Dutch East Indies (now Indonesia). In 1922 a Dutch Provincial Grand Lodge, under the Grand Orient of the Netherlands, at Weltevreden (Batavia) controlled twenty Lodges in the colony: fourteen in Java, three in Sumatra and others in Makassar and Salatiga.

Administers the Provincial Grand Lodge of Zimbabwe which has 5 lodges under its jurisdiction, 3 in Harare and one each in Marondera and Bulawayo. The Grand Lodge was formed in 1963 and the first lodge, Zambesia in Bulawayo, in 1896.

== Grand Masters ==
- 1735 - 1748 : Johan Cornelis Radermacher
- 1749 - 1752 : Kolonel Joost Gerrit van Wassenaer (1716-1753)
- 1752 - 1756 : Louis Dagran (interim)
- 1756 - 1758 : Albrecht Nicolaas van Aerssen Beijeren
- 1758 - 1759 : Carel van Bentinck
- 1759 - 1798 : Carel van Boetzelaer
- 1798 - 1804 : Isaak van Teylingen
- 1804 - 1810 : Cornelis Gerrit Bijleveld
- 1810 - 1812 : Isaac Bousquet
- 1812 - 1816 : Willem Philip Barnaart
- 1816 - 1816 : Tussenbestuur van negen
- 1816 - 1881 : Prince Frederick of the Netherlands
- 1882 - 1884 : Alexander, Prince of Orange
- 1885 - 1892 : Pieter Johannes Gesinus van Diggelen
- 1892 - 1906 : Gerrit Van Visser
- 1906 - 1917 : Simon Marius Hugo van Gijn
- 1917 - 1923 : Meinhard Steven Lingbeek
- 1923 - 1927 : Willem Sonneveld
- 1926 - 1929 : Johannes Hendrik Carpentier-Alting
- 1929 - 1941 : Hermannus van Tongeren
- 1945 - 1952 : L.J.J. Caron
- 1952 - 1961 : C.M.R. Davidson
- 1961 - 1962 : M. ten Cate
- 1962 - 1974 : J. Kok
- 1974 - 1979 : G. van Wezel
- 1979 - 1982 : Th. Boesman
- 1982 - 1986 : W. Sepp
- 1986 - 1990 : J.M. Barents
- 1990 - 1997 : R. Schultink
- 1997 - 2000 : B. Sarphati
- 2000 - 2003 : P.G. Roodhuyzen
- 2003 - 2010 : J.D. van Rossum
- 2010 - 2016 : W.S. Meijer
- 2016 - 2022 : G. van Eijk
- 2022 - present : L.A. Jonkers
