= Karel Zaalberg =

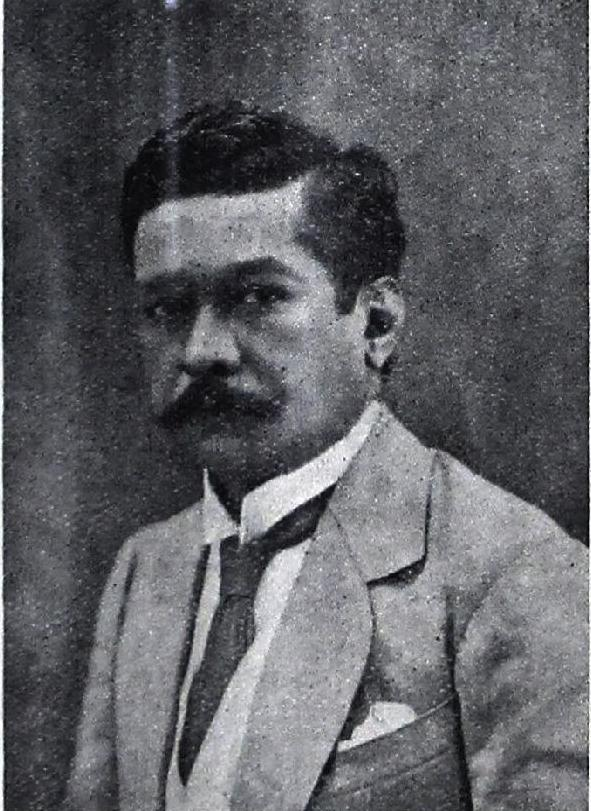
- Karel Zaalberg, political champion for Indo emancipation.
- Born: Frans Hendrik Karel Zaalberg; 26 November 1873; Batavia, Dutch East Indies
- Died: 13 February 1928 (aged 54); Batavia, Dutch East Indies
- Occupations: Writer, journalist, politician

Frans Hendrik Karel Zaalberg (26 November 1873 – 13 February 1928) was an Indo (Eurasian) journalist and politician in the Dutch East Indies.

He was born in Batavia, Java, Dutch East Indies, and also died there. He was the son of a Dutch father Pieter Jacobus Adrianus Zaalberg, Secretary at the Department of Education and Religious Affairs in the Dutch East Indies, and an Indo (Eurasian) mother Susanna Elisabeth de Bie. He was married to Maria Taunay (born 1878) from 22 April 1899 up to her death in 1911. Both the Zaalberg and De Bie family were of Jewish descent. They had two sons and three daughters, one of whom died young.

Karel Zaalberg was a journalist and editor in Dutch East Indies who, despite having only a primary school education, was largely self-taught and rose to become chief editor of a large newspaper. He was noted for advocating educational opportunities for the Indo-Europeans in the colony, and as a journalist, he became a spokesman for the Indo-European (Eurasian) community.

He was the director of the first organization for Indo-Europeans in the Dutch East Indies ('Indische Bond' of 1898). After 1919 he became a founder and board member of the Indo-European Alliance (Dutch: ‘Indo Europeesch Verbond'), with over 10,000 members the largest interest group of this population. From 1924 until his death, four years later, he represented the party in the Dutch East Indies People's Council (Volksraad).

Zaalberg was a leading figure in the political and social emancipation of the Indo (Eurasian) community of the Dutch East Indies of the late 19th and early 20th century, who had closely befriended famous figures of the time like writer P.A. Daum, E.du Perron, and independence activist Ernest Douwes Dekker.

== Early years ==
Due to a traffic accident, his father became disabled and the impoverished family was unable to send their children to any form of higher or even secondary education. Young Zaalberg found a simple and low-ranking job at a big newspaper (copying addresses). It is there, however, where the intelligent Zaalberg learned the ropes of journalism, as well as English and French (by translating foreign newspaper articles and telegrams).

The editor chief P.A. Daum, who was one of the most famous writers and journalists of the time, started to notice Zaalberg's talents and gave him more and more responsibilities. Daum, an autodidact himself, soon made Zaalberg his right-hand man, taking a position against the widespread discrimination regarding Indos, who were seldom admitted to the highest layers of the colonial hierarchy. After Daum fell seriously ill Zaalberg replaced him successfully, but after the passing of his mentor the newspaper did not allow Zaalberg to replace him as editor-in-chief. The new chief editors failed miserably and the position remained vacant for a long time. Only after threatening to quit Zaalberg was appointed Chief Editor of the 'Bataviaasch Nieuwsblad'.

== Politics ==
Meanwhile, Zaalberg had also emerged himself into politics and became a champion of the interests of the Indo-Eurasians. His attention was focused on the acquisition of civil rights, including the right to political association and the right to vote, for native-born (Indo-)Europeans as well as educated Javanese and Chinese. He also published several articles on the need for education for the native population and increasing involvement in the government of the archipelago. The appointment of Ernest Douwes Dekker (an Indo like Zaalberg) as deputy editor in 1907 increased the political momentum of the 'Batavian Newspaper'. It had good contacts with young Javanese intellectuals and was actively involved in the formation of ‘Boedi Oetomo’ an event which is seen as the beginning of Indonesian nationalism. The close friendship between Douwes Dekker and Zaalberg initially led to joint plans with 'Budi Utomo' to aim for a parliament representing all native communities, including the Indo-Eurasians.

Even though Zaalberg was opposed to the colonial policy of the Netherlands, which in his opinion seemed ignorant to the inevitable struggle for emancipation of the Indonesian peoples, Zaalberg was not a radical revolutionary. His sharp and biting criticism was always framed in a positivist worldview, in which gradual and reasonable development, also about the colonial relationship, remained paramount. Unlike Dekker who in the tradition of his famous ancestor, the writer of 'Max Havelaar', did not hesitate to taunt the authorities. This is also where the radical Dekker and the moderate Zaalberg fell out and went their separate ways. Dekker went on to found the 'Indische Party' in 1912 and Zaalberg the 'Indo Europeesch Vebond' in 1919.

== Final years ==
After his breakup with Dekker, coinciding with a temporary decline in his journalistic career and the death of his beloved wife, his health started failing. He still however experienced his finest hour when he acted as chairman at the founding meeting of the Indo-European Alliance (Dutch: ‘Indo Europeesch Verbond') in 1919. As a board member of the 'IEV' he became a representative in the Dutch East Indies 'Volksraad' (House of Assembly), an infant form of local parliament, where he remained highly vocal about the need for native educational facilities. At age 53 he succumbed to his health issues. Under the leadership of his successor Dick de Hoog his 'IEV' would become the single most important Indo movement in the Dutch East Indies, with close to 15,000 members.

He was associated with efforts to promote the political and social advancement of the Indo community in the Dutch East Indies. His vision of developing a broad, educated Indo political leadership was not realised. During the late colonial period and the Indonesian National Revolution, the position of the Indo community deteriorated significantly, and many Indos were displaced or emigrated from Indonesia.
