= Indo Europeesch Verbond =

Social movement and political organization founded in 1919

Logo of the Indo Europeesch Verbond

The Indo Europeesch Verbond (IEV) or Indo European Alliance was a social movement and only gradually also political organisation founded in 1919 by the Indo-European (Eurasian) community of the Dutch East Indies that fought for race equality and political say in late colonial Indonesia during the early 20th century.

It was one of the first and largest European organisations in the Dutch East Indies that formulated a desire for an independent nation albeit in relation with a Dutch dominion and supported the Soetardjo Petition of 1936 that aimed for an independent status within a Dutch commonwealth.

Its vision was to retain an important position for the Indo European (Eurasian) segment of Indonesian society after obtaining independence from the Netherlands. Founding father of this organisation was Karel Zaalberg, chief editor of one of the country's largest newspapers, the Bataviaasch Nieuwsblad, and close friend to famous contemporaries like P.A. Daum, E.du Perron and Ernest Douwes Dekker.

Its main chairman and president (1929–1939) was Dick de Hoog.

== Background ==
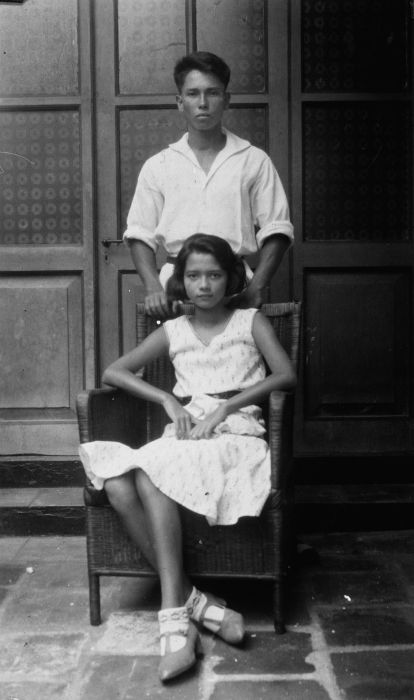
Indo-European brother and sister, Dutch East Indies, 1931

The Dutch East East Indies (1800–1949), nowadays known as Indonesia, was the largest colony in the Dutch Empire. The colonial hierarchy consisted of 2 legal classes: 1) the European class; 2) the Indigenous class. In 1920 a third class: Foreign Easterners (Dutch: id:Vreemde Oosterlingen) was added. The Eurasians known as Indos made up almost 75% of the European headcount.

The Dutch East Indies had a non egalitarian and patriarchal social and legal system. Indo children were for instance only registered as European if the European father decided to acknowledge his children with his indigenous partner. When this did not happen these Indo children would be assimilated into their mothers’ indigenous community. The colonial saying to describe this phenomenon was “The (Indo) child would disappear into the kampung (English: native village)”.

Within the official European legal class Indos could be found in all 3 social layers of European society. This European segment of society can be broadly divided into the following 3 social layers: 1) a small top layer of colonial and commercial leadership, including governors, directors, managers (ceo's), etc. Mostly consisting of expatriate Dutchmen; 2) a large middle class of mostly Indo civil servants; 3) lower income (to poor) layer solely consisting of Indo people that were legally European, but had a living standard close or similar to the indigenous masses.

Since 1870, none of these layers were allowed to own and work land and with the continued arrival of white Dutch expatriates, their social status in colonial times increasingly depended on their efforts to blend into the white upper class. Within the legal class of Europeans, therefore, there was clear social, cultural and mental distinction between the so-called expatriate ‘Totok’ (full blooded) European and native ‘Indo’ (mixed) European.

== Prelude ==
The watershed moment initiating the political emancipation process of the Eurasian segment of colonial society occurred in the middle of the 19th century, when Indos massively protested the discriminatory provisions implemented with the introduction of the 'Cultivation System' (1830–1870). The start of the 20th century also saw continued and increasing pauperism among poor Indos increasingly dependent on charity, which created the mental specter of indivertible impoverishment.

Moreover, the reality of plural colonial society composed of two main social orders (the European and Indigenous communities), living side by side, yet without mingling into one political, economic or cultural unit, pushed the Indo-European in a fundamental position of insecurity. From the pre-colonial position of "middle men" the Indos in colonial history progressively became "marginal men". With the introduction of the ‘Ethical Policy' (1900–1930) Indos not only experienced the near impossible task of resisting pressure from the powerful Dutch authorities, but also from the rising numbers of the educated indigenous elite representing the massive majority of indigenous peoples.

Inspired by Ernest Douwes Dekker‘s short-lived 'Indische Party' (1912–1913) and the establishment of an infant form of a Dutch East Indies parliament, called the People's Council (Dutch: Volksraad) in 1917, the IEV was founded by Karel Zaalberg in 1919.

== History 1920s ==
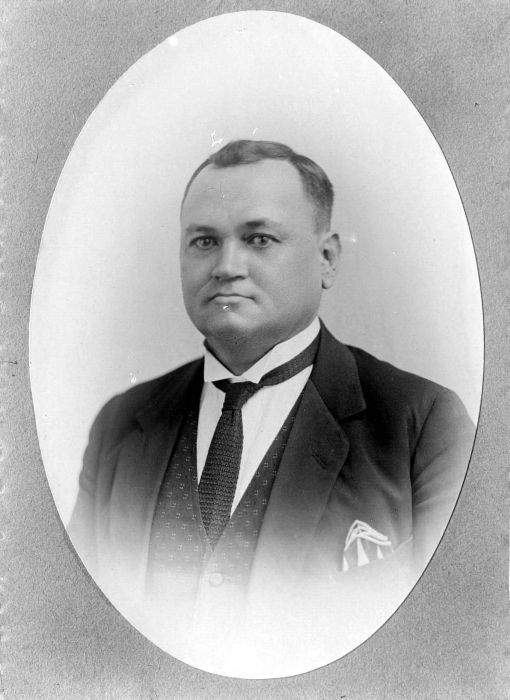
IEV President Dick de Hoog (1929-1939) aka the Indo General.

From its conception in 1919, the IEV’s first aim was to establish unity among all 3 social layers of the Indo-European community, and was founded under the appropriate motto: ‘One for All, All for One’. To secure the interests of the majority of its middle class it clearly set out to also protect and uplift the most vulnerable bottom layer of Indo society.

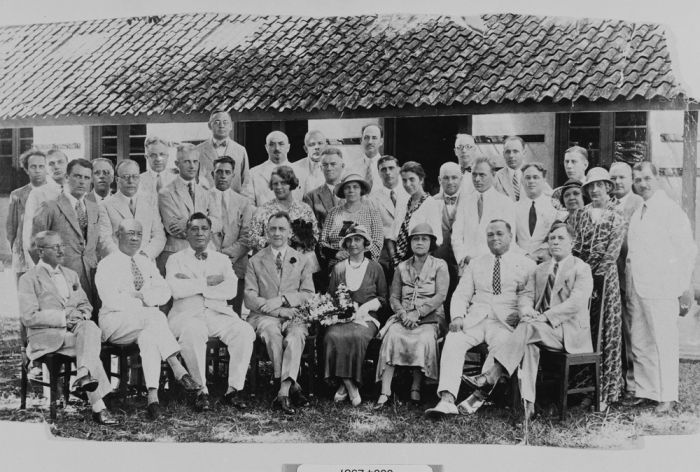
IEV president Dick de Hoog with teachers working in the IEV funded schools.

The organisation started out as a social movement and only gradually entered the political arena. In 1924 it elaborated on its founding principles, by firstly stating an unfaltering trust in Dutch authority as a representation of both the achievements and the potential of Western civilisation and modernisation. Simultaneously it also stated the aspiration to make that same authority redundant and endeavored to move control of the colony back to the Dutch East Indies, envisioning a self-sufficient and independent dominion.

With 10,000 members in 1922 and almost 15,000 members in 1929 it became the largest European political movement of the early 20th century and put independence for the colonial Dutch East Indies on the agenda. Meanwhile, it also experimented with projects aimed to bring Indo Europeans from desk jobs to agriculture as well as to establish more opportunities for education by building schools. It also elected members to the Volksraad, including Paul Alex Blaauw.

== History 1930s ==
During the economic crisis of the 1930s the organisation remained large however was not met with great enthousiasm by the colonial government. Democratic institutions in the colony were still infantile and the movement was kept on a string by the colonial government, unable to sufficiently reach out to the rising indigenous Indonesian independence movement.

After the economic crisis of 1929 Indos were the first to truly comprehend the profound change initiated by the so-called ‘Dutch Ethical Policy’ (1900–1930). The relatively limited but high quality educational opportunities that had been opened to indigenous peoples had produced a large and growing number of Western style educated indigenous people competing on the job market. Jobs that were traditionally occupied by Indos were more and more taken over by indigenous people. As Indos numbered only 0.3 percent of the 60 million native people inhabiting the Dutch East Indies they came under increasing threat of marginalisation. At the same time the educated indigenous elite was also developing an Indonesian nationalist political agenda.

During the early '30s the IEV still mainly orientated itself on the colonial top layer of Dutch expatriates and settlers, striving for true equality between the Dutch ruling class and the Indo-Europeans and profiling themselves as exponents of Western modernity in the Dutch East Indies. For a while they even allied with the far political right i.e. ‘Vaderlandsche Club’ and lobbied for incentives to persuade Dutch expatriates to settle in the colony.

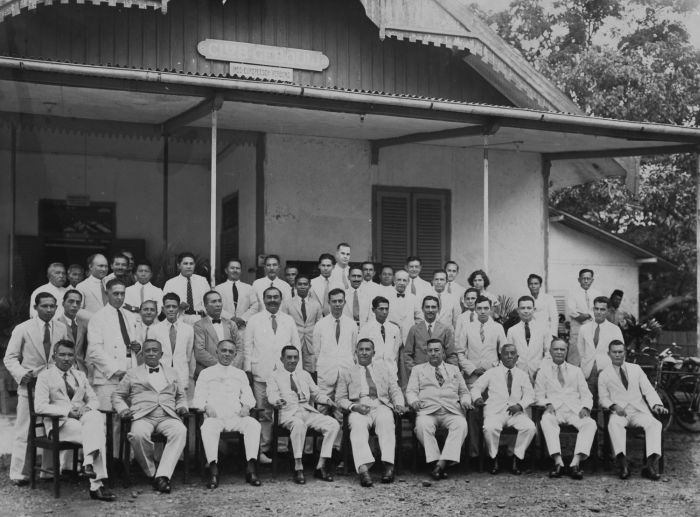
IEV meeting in Buitenzorg.

In the second half the '30s the IEV already shifted its orientation towards the nationalist indigenous movements and now openly advocated restrictions to the arrival of Dutch expatriates. The IEV was blatantly critical of the Governor-General and supported the Soetardjo Petition calling for Indonesian independence in 1936. It also advocated an Indies citizenship for all natives and the removal of the ban on Indos to own land. Simultaneously the IEV also continued attempts to build a class of Indo farmers as the economic crisis of the 1930s left Indos bereft of a network for agricultural subsistence able to produce the basic supplies of sustenance. After more than 10 years of leading the IEV its popular president Dick de Hoog died in 1939.

When in 1942 World War II hit the Dutch East Indies the Indo emancipation process was cut short and all political activity ended with the incarceration of the IEV leadership by the Japanese occupiers, while the indigenous independence movement accelerated into the Indonesian revolution.

== History 1940s ==
Due to earlier hesitation and the Japanese occupation during World War II, the IEV had missed the attachment to the indigenous Independence movements and came into political disorientation. This ultimately contributed to the isolation of its Indo European followers during the Indonesian National Revolution. Right after Japan's capitulation in 1945 IEV leaders started to reorganise and rebuild their organisation. Attempts were made to find common ground with Indonesian revolutionaries, but were overtaken by the chaotic violence of the Bersiap period when IEV forerunner Ploegman was one of the first of almost 20,000 Indos to be killed by Pemuda.

Disappointment in the inability of the Dutch government to provide security and civil order as well as its indifference towards the political and social position of Indos left the IEV bewildered. In 1946 sentiments of desperation were reflected in a cartoon by Indo artist Eppo Doeve in the Dutch main monthly magazine 'Elsevier' headed by the text: "Those about to die salute you." Frustrated with what was perceived as Dutch apathy, negative sentiments towards the Dutch government started to prevail and by 1947 the IEV was advocating Indonesian citizenship for Indos. In 1949 the Netherlands officially ceded control to an independent Indonesian Republic.

== Final years ==
In 1951 the IEV only accepted members that had chosen Indonesian citizenship and changed its name to the Indonesian name: 'Gabungan Indo Untuk Kesatuan Indonesia' (GIKI). All signs of goodwill towards the Indonesian Republic however did not mitigate anti-Dutch regulations by the Republican government and anti-Indo sentiments in general. Throughout the decade all Dutch language institutions for Indos continued to be eliminated. All schools, orphanages and retirement homes for Indos were closed by 1951. Widespread discrimination in the job market made it impossible for most Indos to pursue meaningful careers, while simultaneously the existing social security benefits were terminated by the Republican government.

To distract attention from faltering economic progress and strengthen the fragile unity of the young Republic, President Sukarno continued his strategy of anti-western politics indirectly stimulating anti-Indo polarization. With the traumatic memory of the Bersiap violence in mind, most Indos that had originally chosen Indonesian citizenship revised their decision. Even IEV leaders that had previously advocated Indonesian citizenship now fled the country. By 1962 both the IEV and its constituency had practically disappeared from Indonesia.

Remnants of the IEV and GIKI in Indonesia have later merged to the GIKI foundation on 14 May 1961, later becoming inactive in the 80's. The foundation later split to Surabaya and East Java camps. What remained in the Surabaya foundation became the SMA GIKI I and III, who similarly still used the Indo Europeesch Verbond logo.
