= Bataviaasch Nieuwsblad =

Newspaper in the Dutch East Indies

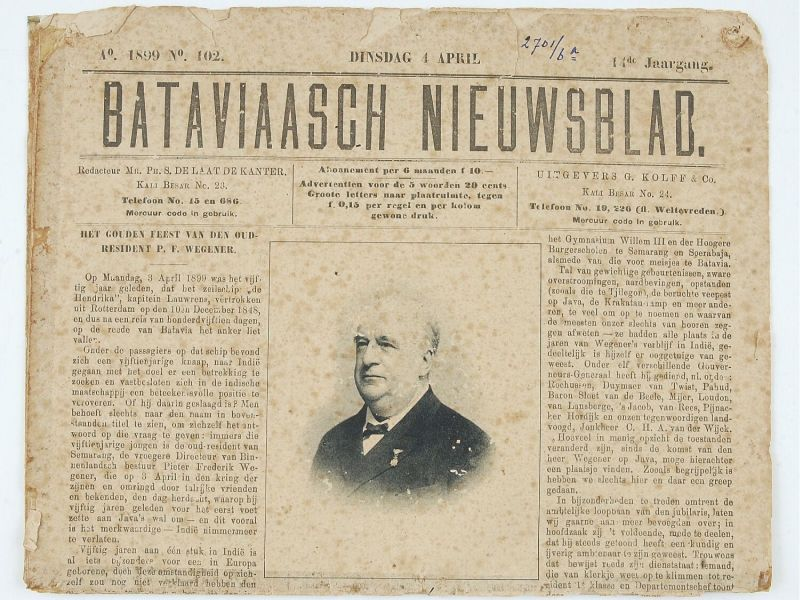
- Edition of 4 April 1899
- Type: Daily newspaper
- Founder: P. A. Daum
- Founded: 1 December 1885
- Ceased publication: December 1957
- Language: Dutch
- Headquarters: Batavia, Dutch East Indies

The Bataviaasch Nieuwsblad (Dutch pronunciation: [baːˈtaːvijaːs ˈniuzblɑt]; Batavian Newspaper) was one of the leading and largest daily newspapers in the Dutch East Indies. It was based in Batavia (now Jakarta) on Java, but read throughout the archipelago. It was founded by the famous Dutch newspaperman and author P. A. Daum in 1885 and existed to 1957.

The innovative and popular newspaper was very critical towards the colonial government and became a mouthpiece for the Indos in the Dutch East Indies, who were the largest Dutch speaking segment of society. Over the years it had employed many leading figures from the Indo-European (Eurasian) community, including: E. du Perron, Ernest Douwes Dekker and Tjalie Robinson. P.A. Daum's successor as editor in chief Karel Zaalberg, became the founder of the Indo Europeesch Verbond, the largest social movement and political organisation for Indo-Europeans.

The progressive newspaper also gave ample publicity to the plight of the indigenous peasantry and the evolution of Indonesian national awareness. It was the first to report on the founding of the first indigenous political organisation Budi Utomo in 1908.

== Foundation ==
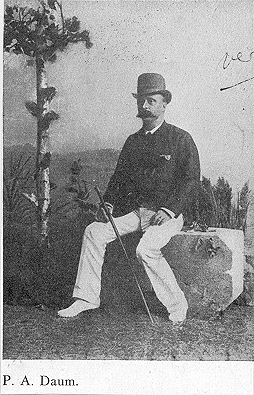
P. A. Daum is the founder of the Bataviaasch Nieuwsblad.

The founder P. A. Daum was well aware the Dutch Indies press played an important role in social, political and cultural developments in the Dutch East Indies. He saw himself as a journalist as well as a commentator, and at times as a sharp critic of the colonial government.

"...we grab the pen in an attempt to describe the misery of a whole population, caused by the deplorable system of colonial governance, under which they suffer." – P. A. Daum

At the height of his career as both a journalist and novelist Daum's hardest collision with the colonial authority occurred in 1885 in Semarang, when he was chief editor of Het Indisch Vaderland (The Indies Fatherland). When legal proceedings were taken against him he lost his job and the paper, which led to his departure to Batavia. There he founded the Bataviaasch Nieuwsblad with D. A. Hooyer director of Kolff Publishing. The first issue appeared on 1 December 1885. In 1887 Daum was still convicted for his conflict with the authorities in Semarang and sent to jail in Batavia for a month. He nonetheless kept managing his newspaper from prison.

Also later chief editors like J. F. Scheltema (1900) came into conflict with the colonial authorities. Scheltema was also given a one-month prison sentence after strongly criticizing individual senior officials, the postal service and particularly the opium policy.

== Innovation ==
Daum developed a new formula to maximise the newspapers target audience. By printing a smaller size paper than usual (i.e. 26 x 40 cm), he was able to lower its price to half of what was usual and also reach the less affluent segment of Dutch speaking society, which mostly consisted of Indo-Europeans. Within the first half-year following its establishment the Newspaper had as many subscribers as its competition. Another important feature for which Daum's newspaper was known were his popular novels which he published as a weekly series in the newspaper. Partly due to the successful commercial and serial nature of his writing, it was only after his death that Daum was acknowledged as one of the greats of Dutch literature.

== Notable editors and journalists ==
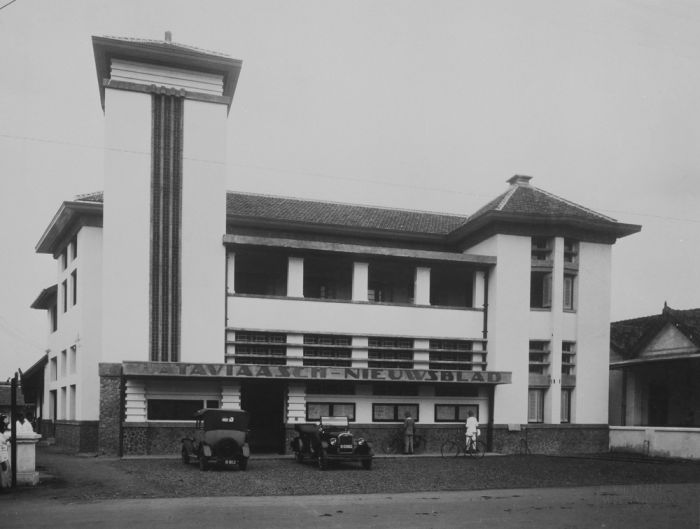
Office building in Batavia

After several years of procrastination due to his Indo Eurasian background Daum's prodigy Karel Zaalberg officially became chief editor in 1908 and continued the papers progressive and successful strategy. His deputy chief was Ernest Douwes Dekker. Both men would not only become friends but also become influential and progressive political figures in the Dutch East Indies. While Dekker started his own newspaper (1911) and political party named the Indische Party (1912), Zaalberg founded the Indo alliance named the Indo Europeesch Verbond in 1918 and became a member of the Volksraad.

Another important figure of the time, that started to work for the newspaper in 1910, was the Indo Dominique Willem Berretty. In 1918, Berretty started his company ANETA, the press agency of the Dutch East Indies and predecessor of ANTARA. He established a news monopoly and became one of the wealthiest men in the colony. To this day he is known for his private home, the architectural Art Deco highlight Villa Isola in Bandung.

The Dutch playwright Jan Fabricius was editor of the paper during the First World War.

From 1937 to 1940, the author E. du Perron, a personal friend to the influential intellectuals Andre Malraux and Sutan Sjahrir, was the literary editor of the newspaper. From 1936 to 1942, Tjalie Robinson was a journalist and sports editor at the newspaper. During the Indo diaspora after World War II the avant garde and visionary Tjalie Robinson, founder of the Tong Tong Fair and magazine, would become the single most important champion of Indo culture.

Victor Ido (1869–1948), author, musician and playwright, was the newspapers art editor during Daum's tenure.

== Final years ==
During the economic depression of the 1930s the newspaper had become more conservative. During the Japanese occupation all Dutch-language newspapers were banned. The printing house still printed Indonesian language pro-Japanese publications. After the war, paper shortages and a diminished Dutch-speaking audience were the reason that only one Batavia newspaper appeared, as of 1 June 1946 published by a collaboration of three pre-war metropolitan newspapers, including the Bataviaasch Nieuwsblad. In 1949 the newspaper became independent again (1950–1955), but appeared under the name Nieuwsblad voor Indonesie (Newspaper for Indonesia). After a merger in December 1957, it ceased to exist.
