= Portugis =

Extinct creole from the Moluccas, Indonesia

- Ternateño–Ambaõ
- Ternateño
- Native to: Indonesia
- Extinct: mid-20th century
- Language family: Portuguese Creole: Melayu-Portuguese Creole; Portugis

Language codes
- ISO 639-3: tmg
- Glottolog: tern1248
- Linguasphere: & -ahh 51-AAC-ahg & -ahh

Portugis (Malay–Indonesian for Portuguese), or Ternateño (literally Ternate language), was a Portuguese-based creole language spoken by Christians of mixed Portuguese and Malay ancestry in the islands of Ambon and Ternate in the Moluccas (Indonesia), from the 16th to the middle of the 20th century.

Portugis was a creole based chiefly on Portuguese and Malay.

The language was gradually replaced by a variant of Malay called Ambonese Malay.

== See also ==
- Chavacano (a Spanish-based creole language spoken in the Philippines, including people of Ternate descent)
- Kristang language
