= De Locomotief =

Newspaper in the Dutch East Indies

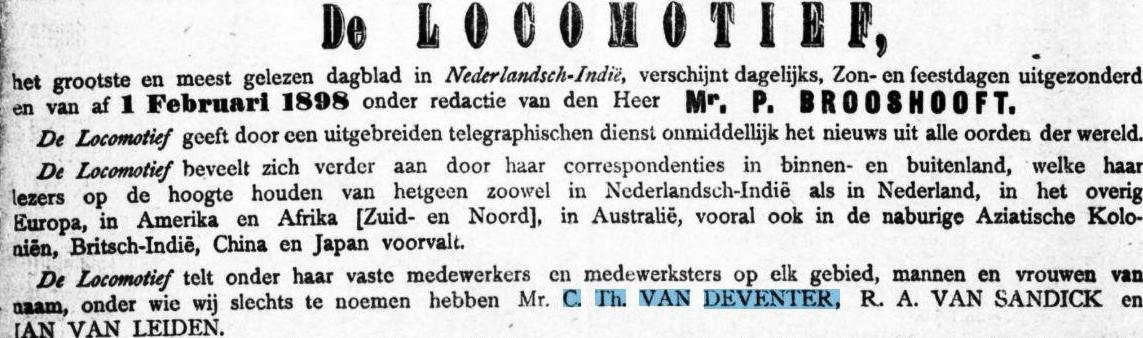
1898 advertisement for De Locomotief

De Locomotief was the first newspaper published in Semarang, in the era of Dutch East Indies. It was established in 1845 and led by Pieter Brooshooft, an ethical political activist.

The daily was originally named Semarangsch Nieuws en Advertentieblad. In 1863 it was renamed De Locomotief, after the passage of the first train in Semarang.

The paper was closed during the second world war but in 1947 the daily De Locomotief was re-opened again.

The Dutch language newspaper was cited outside of Indonesia in the 1950s as a source of information about Indonesian War of Independence issues.

In 1956, the newspaper was closed and the building was taken over by the Bumi Daya Bank after the renovation.

A significant part of the run of the newspaper was microfilmed.

The material in the newspaper has been used to review events that occurred during the era of the Netherlands East Indies.

== Dates ==
- Started: January 1864
- Suspended: March 1940
- Recommenced: September 1947
- Ceased: 1956
