= Multatuli Museum =

Multatuli Museum may refer to two different museums dedicated to the anticolonial Dutch author Multatuli:

- Multatuli Museum (Netherlands), located in Amsterdam
- Multatuli Museum (Indonesia), located in Rangkasbitung, Banten, Indonesia
