= Iriantine Karnaya =

Indonesian sculptor (1950–2022)

Iriantine Karnaya in 2015

Iriantine Karnaya (1950 – 2022) was an Indonesian sculptor and lecturer at the University of Indonesia and the Jakarta Institute of Fine Arts. She is considered to have been the first female Indonesian sculptor to have had a solo exhibition, in 1996.

== Biography ==
Iriantine Karnaya was born in Rangkasbitung, Banten, Indonesia on 9 January 1950. She did a bachelor's degree in art and design at the Bandung Institute of Technology, finishing it in 1975. Her time there was influential in leading her to a modernist sculptural aesthetic which was popular there. She then completed a master's degree in architecture at the University of Indonesia.

As an artist, she held five solo exhibitions during her career. The first was for the Ministry of Education and Culture in Gambir, Jakarta; this is considered by some to have been the first solo exhibition of a female sculptor in Indonesia. Her next solo exhibition was at the Soemardja Gallery at the Bandung Institute of Technology in 1997. The final three were in Jakarta; in 1999 at the Lontar Gallery, in 2000 at the National Gallery and in June 2007 at the National Museum of Indonesia. She also participated in a number of joint exhibitions in Indonesia and abroad, the latest of which was in 2017 at the Soekarno–Hatta International Airport. Among her international exhibitions were in Siena, Italy in 2005; in Japan in 2007 and in the Netherlands in 2008.

She was a lecturer in fine arts at the Technical Faculty school at the University of Indonesia (Indonesian: Fakultas Teknik Universitas Indonesia) and at the Jakarta Fine Arts Institute (Indonesian: Institut Kesenian Jakarta).

She died at age 72 on 28 January 2022, at Gatot Soebroto Army Central Hospital in Jakarta. She was buried in the San Diego Hills Cemetery in West Java.

== Artistic works ==
Among her early works in the late 1990s were bronze sculptures such as Ozone (1996), which dealt with the environment, and Lady in Waiting (1996), which referenced the plight of Indonesian women sent abroad as domestic workers. Fellow sculptor Dolorosa Sinaga described her as being focused on form rather than style in that work, and as an open minded and sensitive artist.

Her 2007 exhibition, titled Menu Hari Ini (the menu today), focused on large mushroom sculptures. She explored themes of growth and spread, but also attempts to control and limit rapid spread and contagion.
