= Bonnie Triyana =

Indonesian historian and politician

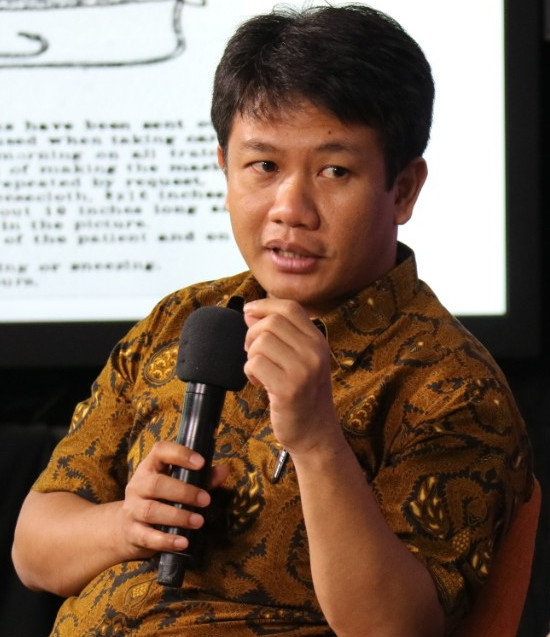

Member of the House of Representatives
- Incumbent
- Assumed office 1 October 2024
- Parliamentary group: PDI-P Faction
- Constituency: Banten I

Personal details
- Born: Bonnie Triyana; 1979 (age 46–47) Rangkasbitung, Banten, Indonesia
- Party: PDI-P
- Education: Diponegoro University (S.Hum.)
- Occupation: Politician; historian
- Known for: Historia magazine

Bonnie Triyana (born 1979) is an Indonesian historian, politician, and museum curator. He founded the Indonesian-language history magazine Historia and is its director and editor-in-chief.

In the 2024 Indonesian general election, he was elected to the House of Representatives to represent the Indonesian Democratic Party of Struggle in the Banten 1 district (Lebak and Pandeglang). He was initially declared to have lost to Tia Rahmania, but following an electoral commission decision he was announced as the winning candidate.

== Biography ==
Bonnie Triyana was born in Rangkasbitung, Banten, Indonesia in 1979. He lived in Sumatra for a time, where his father worked as a plantation manager. He studied history at Diponegoro University in Semarang, graduating with a bachelor's degree in 2003. In that same year, he co-edited (with Budi Setiyono) a new book of speeches by former Indonesian president Sukarno.

Inspired by the Brazilian popular history magazine Istoria, Triyana founded the monthly Indonesian-language history magazine Historia. It began as a website in 2010 and was launched as a print edition in 2012. Since then he has been sought out for opinion on historical matters in the Indonesian press; for example, in 2014 his opposition to former Indonesian president Suharto being declared a National Hero of Indonesia (a proposal by then-presidential candidate Prabowo Subianto).

Triyana was involved in a group which successfully advocated in 2012 for the restoration of a former Sarekat Islam school in Semarang which had fallen into disrepair, due to its historical significance to the anti-colonial movement in the Dutch East Indies. In 2018 he helped Lebak Regency in Banten establish the Multatuli Museum in Rangkasbitung in a 1923 building that had originally been the office of the Wedana (a type of colonial official). The museum faced some opposition from local student groups who believed it glorified a non-Indonesian, Dutch colonizer.

As part of the Dutch research program Independence, Decolonization, Violence and War in Indonesia, 1945-1950, Triyana spoke before the standing committee on Foreign Affairs at the House of Representatives on 23 May 2022 to present an Indonesian perspective on the violent departure of the Dutch from Indonesia.

== Bersiap controversy ==
In early 2022 Triyana was a guest curator of the exhibition Revolusi! Indonesia Independent on the Indonesian National Revolution at the Rijksmuseum in Amsterdam. His participation became controversial in the Netherlands when, in a column in the Dutch newspaper NRC Handelsblad, he explained his view that the word "Bersiap" should be dropped from the exhibit, saying that the use of the term in the exhibit would "simplify" the narrative in the exhibit and reinforce stereotypes of "primitive, uncivilized Indonesians". The Federation of Dutch Indos filed a complaint to the Dutch police about the matter on 13 January 2022, accusing Triyana of stigmatizing Indonesian and Dutch survivors of that historical period and downplaying the violence against them. This was followed by a counter-complaint against the Rijksmuseum, its director, and the lead curator of the exhibition by the Dutch Honorary Debts Committee Foundation on 21 January. The police decided not to pursue charges and the Rijksmuseum continued to use the term in the exhibit, noting that Triyana had been expressing his personal opinion in the editorial.

== Political career ==
In June 2023, Triyana announced that he had stepped down as managing editor of Historia and announced his candidacy for office in the 2024 Indonesian general election with the Indonesian Democratic Party of Struggle (PDI-P) in the Banten 1 district (Lebak and Pandeglang). The historian Budi Setiyono took over as managing editor of Historia, while Triyana remained editor-in-chief and director. Triyana's sister Virgoyanti is also involved in politics; she is the acting regional secretary of Banten, as well as commissioner of the Bank of Banten and other roles. At first, Bonnie Triyana narrowly failed to win the seat; the victorious candidate Tia Rahmania was declared to have received 37,568 votes to Bonnie's 36,618 votes.

Bonnie Triyana disputed the results of the election in the Banten I district via the Banten election representatives and the internal PDI-P process, and in early September 2024 both candidates were interviewed. Following a 23 September 2024 by the Electoral Commission (KPU), Tia Rahmania was dropped as the candidate and Bonnie Triyana was declared to be the winning candidate. The decision noted that Tia Rahmania had been expelled from the PDI-P party due to alleged voting irregularities and ethical breaches and no longer qualified for the role. The counts were determined to have been inflated in Rahmania's favour in some local districts. There were also allegations made in the press that she was dropped for criticizing the Corruption Eradication Commission (KPK) deputy chair Nurul Ghufron, but this was denied by the PDI-P. On 26 September 2024 Tia Rahmania filed a civil lawsuit against Bonnie Triyana and the PDI-P. Nonetheless, Triyana has been seated in the new session of the House of Representatives which opened on 1 October 2024.

== Selected publications ==
- Revolusi belum selesai: kumpulan pidato Presiden Soekarno, 30 September 1965 - Pelengkap Nawaksara (Ombak, 2005; as co-editor with Budi Setiyono).
- Liber Amicorum: 80 tahun Joesoef Isak, Seorang Wartawan, Penulis dan Penerbit (ISAI/Komunitas Bambu, 2008, co-editor with Max Lane).
- Derom Bangun: memoar "duta besar" sawit Indonesia: dari kampus ITB sampai ke meja diplomasi dunia (Kompas, 2010, cowritten with Derom Bangun)(Kompas, 2011)
- Eddie Lembong: mencintai tanah air sepenuh hati (Kompas, 2011)
- Kabar dari Negeri Seberang (Historia, 2013, as editor)
