= Max Havelaar (film) =

Max Havelaar of de koffieveilingen der Nederlandsche handelsmaatschappij
- Theatrical release poster
- Directed by: Fons Rademakers
- Screenplay by: Gerard Soeteman
- Based on: Max Havelaar by Multatuli
- Produced by: Fons Rademakers
- Starring: Peter Faber; Sacha Bulthuis; Rutger Hauer; Krijn ter Braak; Adendu Soesilaningrat
- Cinematography: Jan de Bont
- Edited by: Pieter Bergema
- Distributed by: Netherlands Fox Corp
- Release date: 9 September 1976
- Running time: 163 minutes
- Country: Netherlands
- Languages: Dutch; Indonesian

Max Havelaar (Dutch: Max Havelaar of de koffieveilingen der Nederlandsche handelsmaatschappij) is a 1976 Dutch drama film directed by Fons Rademakers, based on the 1860 novel Max Havelaar by Multatuli. It was the country's submission for Best Foreign Language Film at the 49th Academy Awards, but was not accepted as a nominee.

== Plot ==
By the 1860, lived a small boy from a farmer's family in Parang Koedjang, Lebak Regency in the Dutch East Indies (present day Indonesia) named Saïdjah. He plays with his kerbau (farming buffalo) in sawah when his father and elder brother is farming with a small group of farmers. Suddenly, a Javan tiger attacks his kerbau, yet his kerbau can survive even kills that Javan tiger. The farmers names his kerbau as "Pantang" (Malay word for "tough"). Not long after that, the group of the Demang (chief district) of Parang Koedjang, Raden Wira Koesoema, comes to them by horses. He warns them to pay tribute to the Regent (Boepati) because the Regent feels displeased. Yet the farmers do not have money to be collected as tribute. Then Demang plunders "Pantang" from them. Säidjah's elder brother tries to fight against the Demang, but he is shot by a KNIL soldier. His dead body is lying down left by the Demang and nobody cares of his elder brother. Contrary with Amsterdam in the same year, a Christmas night service is held at the church and the Priest preaches about the wealth and prosperity in Java, the Dutch colony, without knowing there is abuses and oppressions in that colony. That sermon is attended by Max Havelaar, an ex-Assistant Resident of Manado and Lebak who resigned from this official charges and becomes unemployed in Amsterdam. Havelaar then meets Batavus Droogstoppel, his childhood friend who becomes coffee broker and also owning coffee trading company, Last & Co. Havelaar offers Droogstoppel help him writing a book about coffee trading from Havelaar's essays which was collected when he was in service as Assistant Resident. Droogstoppel helps him forcefully and tries to read it. Then, Droogstoppel accidentally reads one of Havelaar's essay called "On the Coffee Auctions of the Dutch Trading Company" (Dutch title: Op de Koffi-veilingen der Nederlandsche Handel-Maatschappij). And the Havelaar's story of colonialism injustice and corruption is just began in Lebak by the 1855.

In 1855, Christiaan Ernst Pierre (C.E.P.) Carolus a.k.a. Slotering, the Assistant Resident of Lebak, is poisoned to death by the Regent of Lebak, Raden Adipati Karta Nata Negara, after attending at the night house banquet invitation by the Regent. The reason is unclear, probably because Slotering has secret papers about the Regent's crimes and abuses in Lebak. But the doctor reports his death cause due to lever acute, so that Slotering's death seems to be already known and kept secret by the Resident of Bantam, C.P. Brest van Kempen a.k.a. Slijmering, which has involved in a conspiracy to Slotering's murder with the Regent. But nobody knows about this scandal, including the Gouverneur-Generaal of the Dutch East Indies. The Gouverneur-Generaal is recommended by his aide to install Max Havelaar, the Assistant-Resident of Manado, as the successor of Slotering. His aide is Havelaar's brother-in-law. The Gouverneur-Generaal agrees with his aide's recommendation. Havelaar is inaugurated in Gouverneur-Generaal's palace in Buitenzorg and departs to Lebak in the next day with his controller names Verbrugge. As formally usual, Havelaar is greeted warmly by the Regent and his Demangs. In the next day, he is ceremonially taken oath by Slijmering in the Regency royal house. Everything goes well in the few days after that ceremony, until Djaksa (local police chief) tells him about Slotering's secret papers which has been saved by Djaksa. At first, Havelaar tries to ignore what is happened in the past, yet he keeps to maintain his feudal relationship with the Regent, Raden Adipati, as the highest local ruler in Lebak. Havelaar visits the Regency to make a speech which essentially states that he wants everything goes fine and no violation under during his term of office. The Regent requests an advance of remaining tax extra payments from Assistant Residents. Havelaar grants his request even though there is no budget to that payment. Havelaar's wife names Tine a.k.a. "Pussy" (Dutch: Poesje) feels objected to Havelaar's decision, but Havelaar convinces Poesje that he will pay the Regent from his personal savings. Havelaar believes, if the Regent has no lack of money, the Regent will stop robbing his people. But Havelaar's hope is in vain. He caught the Regent was doing abuse, from a simple thing to the serious violation. He finds some sawahs abandoned because all men in some villages are forcedly working to pull the grass and clean the Regent's houseyard. In another day, he also finds some men is working to build aloen-aloen without paid in preparation for welcoming the Regent's royal guests, the Regent of Bandoeng and Tjändjoer.

One day, Havelaar meets Säidjah and his father walking nearby the sawahs. Havelaar asks him where he was going and why he was not ploughing in sawah. Säidjah's father answered that he is going to barter his heirloom kris dagger with a new kerbau. Havelaar then asks when his kerbau death, before or after his speech to the chiefs of Lebak. Säidjah's father answered dishonestly that his kerbau is just dead. Havelaar thinks it is just normal. But in the few weeks when he makes a visit to Säidjah's village, he finds the Demang of Parang Koedjang with his group was collecting kerbaus. Havelaar suspects the Demang is plundering the kerbaus to be served as the banquet for the Regent's royal guests visit, the Regent of Bandoeng and Tjändjoer. The Demang tries to convince Havelaar that he buys kerbaus from the villagers, not to plunder. Havelaar then interrogates Säidjah's father to confront it with the Demang, and wonders why he sold his kerbau while he were barter his heirloom kris to get a new kerbau. Säidjah's father keeps silent because he is afraid of the Demang. Havelaar becomes upset to realize that the people were more afraid of the Demang than himself as Assistant Resident. He immediately left the village back home to write a report about this situation to the Resident of Bantam. Otherwise, the Demang is angry with the villagers and takes away all the kerbaus. The Demang also burns the only Säidjah and his father's clothes so that they are cold at night. Säidjah's father falls in fever at night and dies. Säidjah with an angry feeling comes before the Djaksa. They visit Havelaar's house together to report what really happens. Säidjah brings his kerbau's head as the evidence of kerbau looting by the Regent. Havelaar prepares to collect witnesses about the allegations of the Regent's criminal act. Havelaar attempts to bring this allegations to the court. But Säidjah refuses it because he doubts the court and feels that every colonial high-rank officials are the same as the Regent. Although Havelaar tries to convince Säidjah, Säidjah insists to run away to Lampong joining with the rebels there.

At the aftermath, Säidjah is dead in Lampong killed by KNIL army in a rebellion battle. Havelaar's indictment to the criminal court is blocked by the Resident, Slijmering. Slijmering warns Havelaar that if Havelaar keeps to blow up this incident, Slijmering threatened to revoke Havelaar from his position as Assistant Resident. When Havelaar finds out that he is not supported by the Resident, Havelaar decides to propose the indictment against the Regent by himself. But the court finally wins the Regent, the judge sentenced the Regent to be innocent and there was not enough evidence that he was guilty. The court even decided that Havelaar is "promoted" to serve as the Assistant Resident of Ngawi. Havelaar sees the justice in colonial is corrupted, and he finally resigns from his position as Assistant Resident. He also tries to discuss this case personally to the Gouverneur-Generaal. He brings Poesje and his son to Buitenzorg, and come to visit the Gouverneur-Generaal's palace. When he arrived there, his brother-in-law, who served as the Gouverneur-Generaal's aide, locks Havelaar in a room and told him to be silent and go home to the Netherlands. At last, Havelaar is full angry with the corruption of the Dutch colonial system, and shouting a wall-picture of the King William III that the King must take responsibility of this immoral corruption in his colonial system.

== Cast ==
- Peter Faber as Max Havelaar
- Sacha Bulthuis as Tine "Poesje" (Havelaar's wife)
- Adenan Soesilaningrat as the Regent / Boepati
- Maruli Sitompul as the Demang
- Krijn ter Braak as Verbrugge
- Carl van der Plas as Resident Slijmering
- Rima Melati as Mevrouw Slotering
- Rutger Hauer as Duclari
- Joop Admiraal as Assistant Resident Slotering
- Frans Vorstman as Gouverneur-Generaal
- Piet Burnama as Djaksa (as Pitradjaja Burnama)
- Herry Lantho as Saïdjah
- Leo Beyers as Droogstoppel
- Nenny Zulaini as Adinda

== See also ==
- List of submissions to the 49th Academy Awards for Best Foreign Language Film
- List of Dutch submissions for the Academy Award for Best Foreign Language Film
