= Multatuli Museum (Indonesia) =

- Museum Multatuli
- Location: Jalan Alun-Alun Timur No.8, Rangkasbitung, Banten, Indonesia
- Coordinates: 6°21′38″S 106°14′50″E
- Type: museum
- Website: http://museummultatuli.id/

The Multatuli Museum (Indonesian: Museum Multatuli) is a museum located in Rangkasbitung, Banten, Indonesia. Its focus is the author Multatuli (Eduard Douwes Dekker), who lived in the area in the 1850s and used it as the basis for his famous anti-colonial novel Max Havelaar. The museum also examines Dutch East Indies colonial history, the anti-colonial movement, and the local history of Rangkasbitung. There is another Multatuli Museum in Amsterdam which houses many of the author's papers.

== History ==
Discussions about opening a Multatuli Museum in Rangkasbitung began in the 2010s, with the support of Bonnie Triyana, a historian with roots in the area, as well as teacher Ubaidilah Muchtar, architect Bambang Eryudhawan, and Tempo journalist Kurie Suditomo. Multatuli, whose real name was Edward Douwes Dekker, was a Dutch colonial official who was Assistant Resident in Lebak for a brief period in 1856 before he clashed with his superiors and returned to Europe. Some of the injustices of the colonial society that he witnessed there were portrayed in his famous novel Max Havelaar.

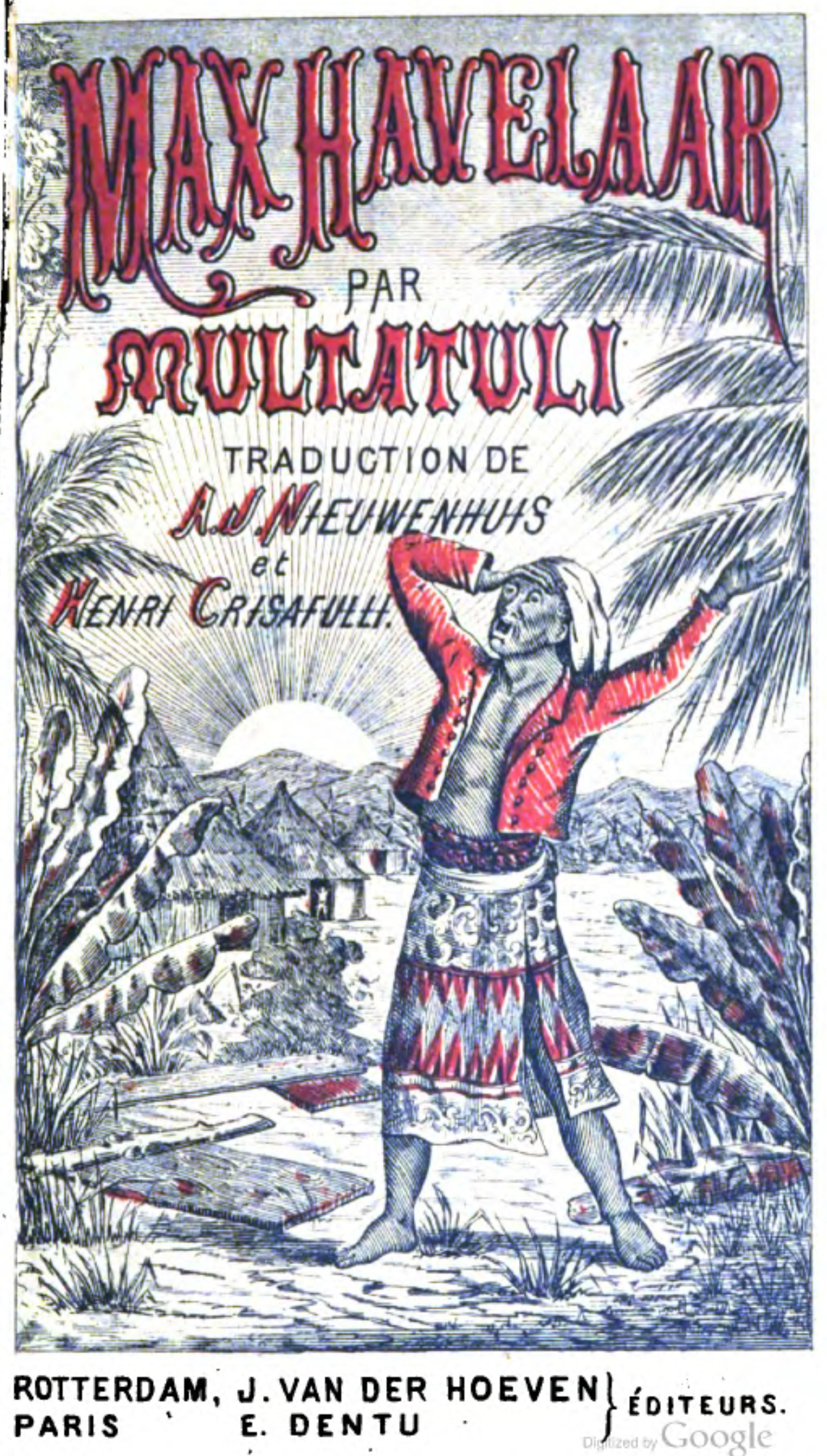
An 1876 French-language edition of Max Havelaar

The museum was opened in February 2018; it is operated by Lebak Regency, the local district-level government. It is located in a 1923 building off Rangkasbitung Square that had originally been the office of the Wedana (a type of colonial official). Although the museum is not officially affiliated with the Multatuli Museum in Amsterdam, it did receive collection items from that museum in preparation for opening. The museum attempts to incorporate the sensory experience of export products such as coffee to immerse the visitor in the nineteenth-century plantation economy portrayed by Multatuli, as well as examining colonial history and the publication of Multatuli's novel. The museum also contains sculptures of Multatuli and characters from the novel by sculptor Dolorosa Sinaga. In its inaugural year, the museum also hosted a cultural festival (Indonesian: Festival Seni Multatuli). The museum was forced to close during the COVID-19 pandemic and reopened in early 2022.
