= KRI Multatuli =

Command ship of the Indonesian Navy

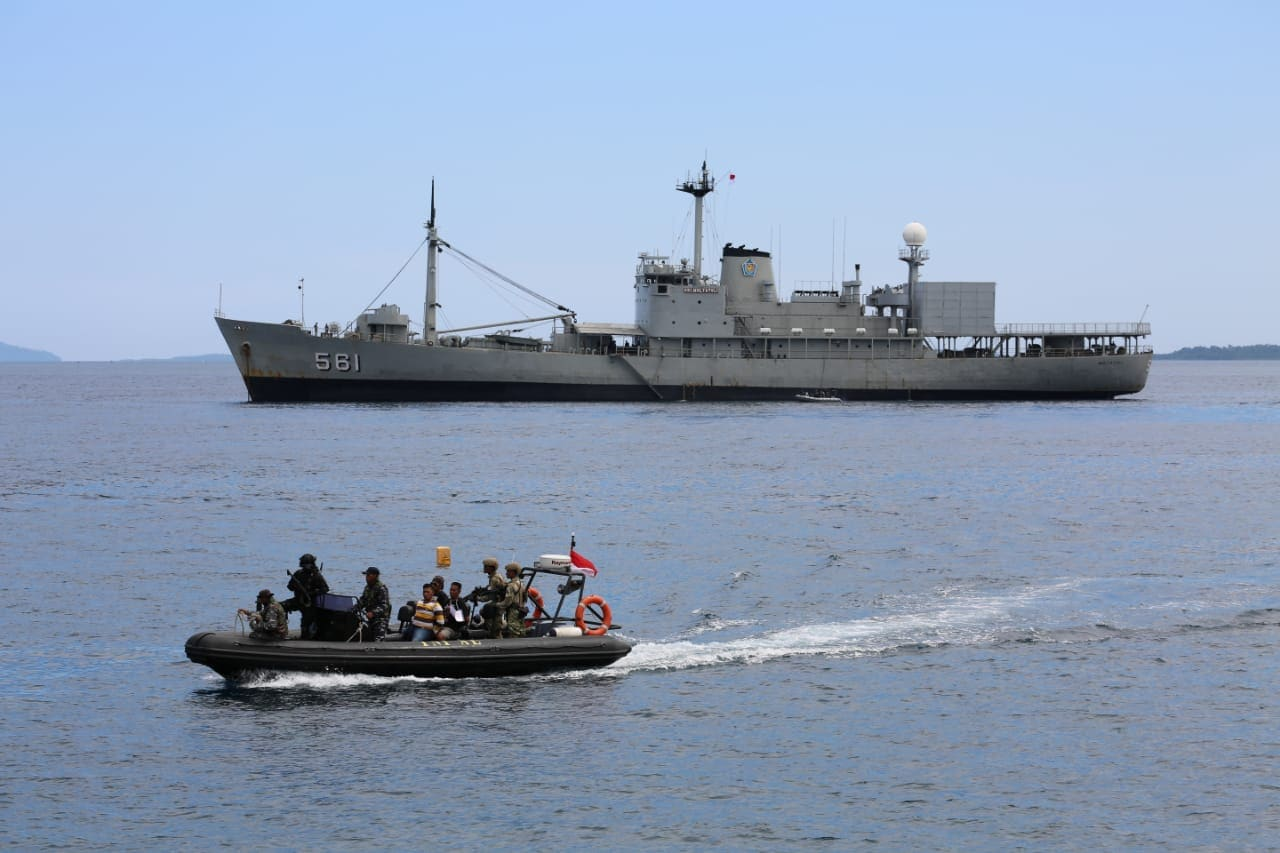
- KRI Multatuli during Jala Krida 18 exercise in 2018

History

Indonesia
- Name: Multatuli
- Namesake: Multatuli
- Builder: Ishikawajima-Harima, Tokyo
- Laid down: 13 June 1961
- Commissioned: August 1961
- Identification: Pennant number: 561
- Status: Active

General characteristics
- Type: Command ship; (originally submarine tender)
- Displacement: 3,220 tons
- Length: 103 metres (338 ft) between perpendiculars; 111.35 metres (365.3 ft) length overall
- Beam: 16 metres (52 ft)
- Draught: 6.98 metres (22.9 ft)
- Propulsion: 1 x Burmeister and Wain diesel engine, 5,500 brake horsepower (4,100 kW)
- Speed: 18.5 knots (34.3 km/h; 21.3 mph) maximum
- Range: 6,000 nautical miles (11,000 km; 6,900 mi) at 16 knots (30 km/h; 18 mph)
- Complement: 134
- Armament: 6 × 37-millimetre (1.5 in) anti-aircraft guns (2 single, 2 twin); 4 × 14.5-millimetre (0.57 in) anti-aircraft guns (2 twin)
- Aviation facilities: Helicopter deck

KRI Multatuli (561) is a command ship operated by the Indonesian Navy.

== Design and construction ==
Multatuli displaces 3,220 tons, is 103 metres (338 ft) long between perpendiculars and 111.35 metres (365.3 ft) in length overall, has a beam of 16 metres (52 ft), and a draught of 6.98 metres (22.9 ft). Propelled by a single Burmeister and Wain diesel engine providing 5,500 brake horsepower (4,100 kW), the vessel can reach a top speed of 18.5 knots (34.3 km/h; 21.3 mph), and has a range of 6,000 nautical miles (11,000 km; 6,900 mi) at 16 knots (30 km/h; 18 mph). She is armed with six 37-millimetre (1.5 in) anti-aircraft guns in two single and two twin mounts, and four 14.7-millimetre (0.58 in) anti-aircraft guns in two twin mounts. A 76-millimetre (3.0 in) gun was originally fitted aft, but this was replaced by a helicopter platform. A hangar was added in 1998. The ship's company is made up of 134 personnel. The vessel is capable of providing replenishment at sea.

== Operational history ==
The ship was designed and constructed by Japanese shipbuilder Ishikawajima-Harima. She was laid down at the company's Tokyo shipyard on 13 June 1961. She was commissioned into the Indonesian Navy in August 1961. Originally designed as a submarine support ship, Multatuli was converted into a fleet command ship for Eastern Command during the late 1960s.

Multatuli is operational as of 2024.
