= Multatuli Museum (Netherlands) =

- Multatuli Huis
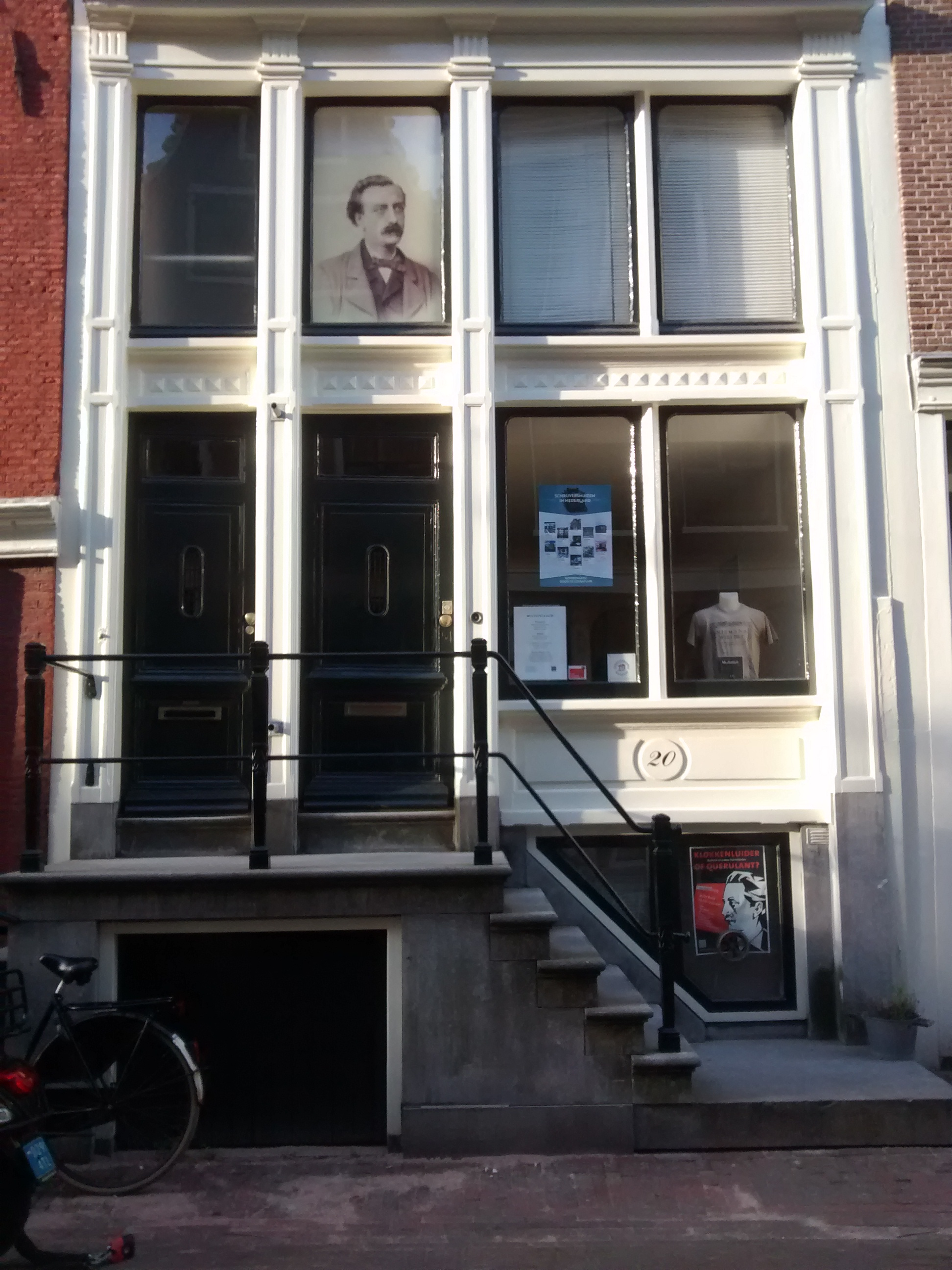

- Location within the city center of Amsterdam
- Location: Korsjespoortsteeg 200; Amsterdam, Netherlands
- Coordinates: 52.378138°N 4.891155°E
- Type: museum
- Accreditation: ICOM, Official Museums of Amsterdam
- Website: http://www.multatuli-museum.nl/home

The Multatuli Museum (also Multatuli House/Huis) is a 17th-century museum in the Jordaan neighbourhood of Amsterdam, Netherlands. It is dedicated to Eduard Douwes Dekker (1820–1887), whose pen name was Multatuli. Multatuli is best known for his 1860 novel Max Havelaar, inspired by time spent in Indonesia while serving in the Dutch civil service. Eduard Douwes Dekker was born in the Multatuli House and he died 67 years later in Ingelheim am Rhein, Germany.

In 2013, the Multatuli House had 1176 visitors. The museum organises regular temporary exhibitions about the writer as well as lectures, symposia and themed guided walks through Amsterdam.

In 2018, another (unaffiliated) Multatuli Museum has also opened in Rangkasbitung, Indonesia.

== Collection ==
At the Multatuli House, one can see how Multatuli would have lived in the 19th century; his personal belongings still decorate the house. These items include his globe, his desk, his library and the red couch on which he died.

Elsewhere, more than 5000 of Multatuli's manuscripts are preserved in the Special Collections at the University of Amsterdam.
