= Serang–Panimbang Toll Road =

Toll Road in Indonesia

- Jalan Tol Serang–Panimbang
- Serpan Toll Road
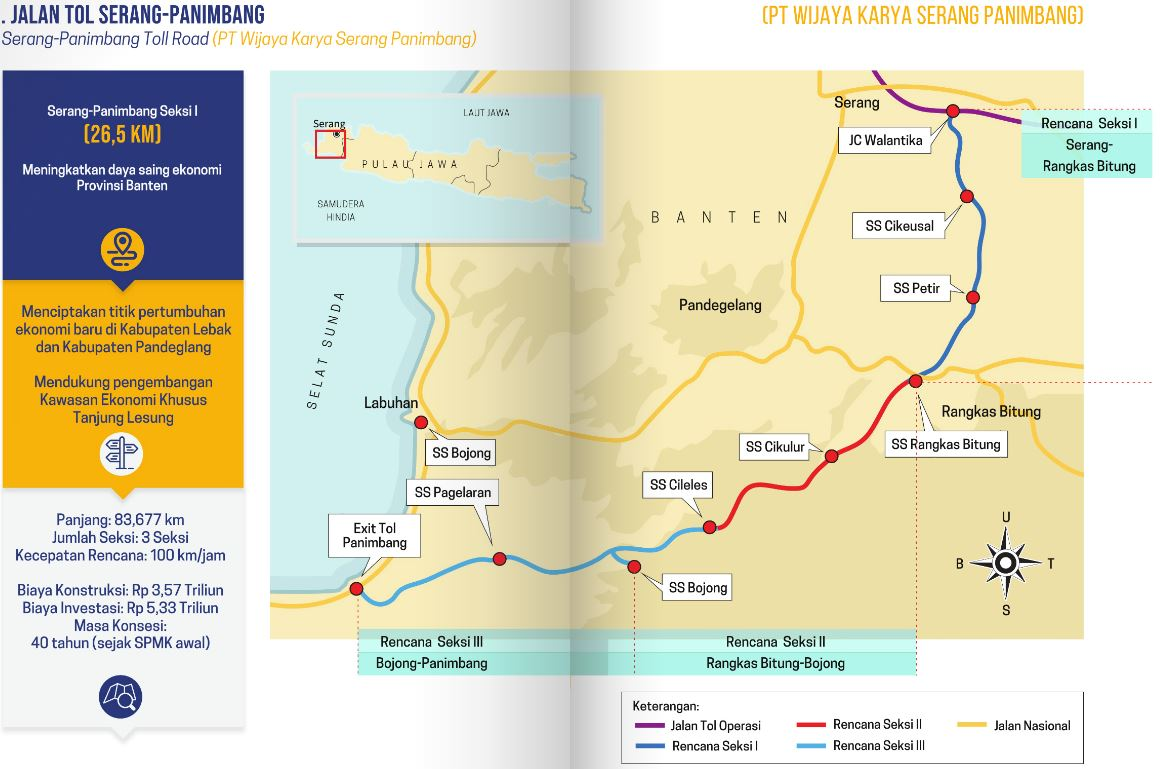

Route information
- Maintained by PT Wijaya Karya Serang-Panimbang
- Length: 83.6 km (51.9 mi)
- Existed: November 16, 2021; 4 years ago–present

Major junctions
- North end: Tangerang-Merak Toll Road
- Tangerang-Merak Toll Road
- South end: Panimbang

Location
- Country: Indonesia
- Provinces: Banten
- Major cities: Serang; Serang Regency; Lebak Regency; Pandeglang Regency

Highway system
- Transport in Indonesia

Serang–Panimbang Toll Road (Serpan Toll Road) is a controlled-access toll road that links Serang with Special Economic Zones of Tanjung Lesung and Ujung Kulon National Park. The toll road is connected with Tangerang-Merak Toll Road. The toll road has length of 83.6 kilometres (51.9 mi). This toll road is built to ease logistics and goods travel from industrial areas in Pandeglang Regency and Lebak Regency all the way to Port of Merak or Port of Tanjung Priok. Section I has been inaugurated by President Joko Widodo on 16 November 2021.

== Sections ==
The toll road is divided into 3 sections, with Section I having already been inaugurated by President Joko Widodo on 16 November 2021, while the remaining sections are currently undergoing land acquisition and construction phase.

Section	Route	Status
I	Serang-Rangkasbitung	Opened
II	Rangkasbitung-Cileles	Land acquisition and construction phase
III	Cileles-Panimbang	Land acquisition and construction phase

== Exits ==
Province	Location	km	mi	Exit	Name	Destinations	Notes
Banten	Walantaka, Serang	65.0	40.4	65	Walantaka Interchange	Tangerang–Merak Toll Road; Westbound; Serang; Cilegon; Port of Merak; Eastbound; Cikande; Balaraja; Tangerang; Alam Sutera; Kembangan; Jakarta	Northern terminus
Banten	Cikeusal, Serang Regency	73.6	45.7	73	Cikeusal Toll Gate	Cikeusal; Panosogan; Silebu; Walantaka	
Banten	Tunjung Teja, Serang Regency	82.0	51.0	82	Tunjung Teja Toll Gate	Tunjung Teja; Petir; Pamarayan; Kolelet; Jawilan; Cikande	
Banten	Rangkasbitung, Lebak Regency	90.7	56.4	90	Rangkasbitung Toll Gate	Rangkasbitung; Pandeglang; Maja; Warunggunung	
Banten	Cikulur, Lebak Regency			TBA	Cikulur Toll Gate	Cikulur; Sampay	
Banten	Cileles, Lebak Regency			TBA	Cileles Toll Gate	Cileles; Gunung Kencana; Malingping; Bayah; Pelabuhan Ratu	
Banten	Bojong, Pandeglang Regency			TBA	Bojong Toll Gate	Bojong; Saketi; Menes; Banjarsari; Munjul; Kerta; Picung; Jalupang; Malingping; Bayah; Pelabuhan Ratu	
Banten	Pagelaran, Pandeglang Regency			TBA	Pagelaran Toll Gate	Pagelaran; Patia; Labuan	
Banten	Panimbang, Pandeglang Regency			TBA	Panimbang Toll Gate	Panimbang; Tanjung Lesung; Ujung Kulon National Park; Labuan; Carita Beach	Southern terminus
1.000 mi = 1.609 km; 1.000 km = 0.621 mi: Electronic toll collection; Route transition; Unopened

== See also ==
- Trans-Java Toll Road
