= Rangkasbitung =

- Town and District

Other transcription(s)
  - Sundanese: ᮛᮀᮊᮞ᮪ᮘᮤᮒᮥᮀ
  - Pegon: راڠكاسبيتوڠ
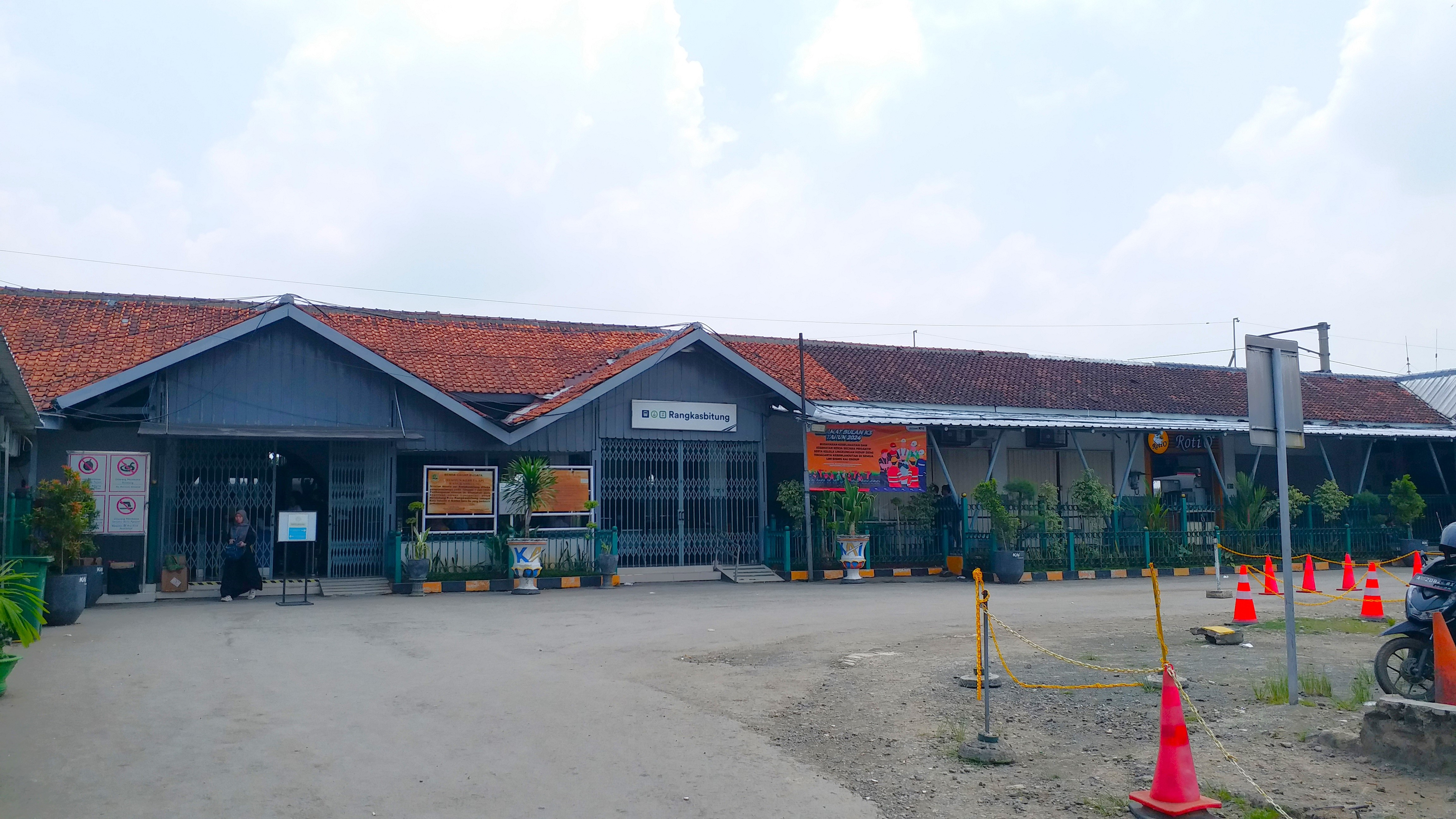
- Front facade of Rangkasbitung railway station (2024)

- Location of Rangkasbitung in Indonesia Rangkasbitung (Banten)
- Coordinates: 6°21′20″S 106°15′04″E
- Country: Indonesia
- Province: Banten
- Regency: Lebak Regency

Government
  - Camat: Agus Sudrajat

Area
  - Total: 74.22 km^{2} (28.66 sq mi)
- Elevation: 22 m (72 ft)

Population (mid 2023 estimate)
  - Total: 144,733
  - Density: 1,950/km^{2} (5,051/sq mi)
- Time zone: UTC+7 (WIB)
- Area code: +62 252
- Website: web.archive.org/web/20220402143930/https://rangkasbitung.id/

Rangkasbitung (Sundanese: ᮛᮀᮊᮞ᮪ᮘᮤᮒᮥᮀ; pronounced [raŋkasˈbit̪ʊŋ]), colloquially called Rangkas (Indonesian pronunciation: [ˈraŋkas]), is a town (serving as the administrative centre of Lebak Regency) and an administrative district (kecamatan), in Banten Province of Java, Indonesia. The district covers an area of 73.76 km^{2}, and had a population of 116,659 at the 2010 Census and 134,945 at the 2020 Census, while the official estimate as of mid-2023 was 144,733, comprising 73,678 males and 71,055 females.

It is the site of the Multatuli Museum, a history museum that opened in 2018.

== History ==
The establishment of Rangkasbitung stemmed from the Dutch East Indies Governor's Decree No.15 ordering the relocation of Lebak Regency's capital. After receiving the order, the Regent of Lebak, Karta Natanegara, asked his deputy, Patih Jahar, to find a strategic site that could serve as Lebak's new capital. He discovered bamboo forests and believed it was the site that the regent wanted. The forests were soon cleared, and the site was named Rangkasbitung. Afterwards, development was carried out and Rangkasbitung officially became the capital of Lebak on 31 May 1851, replacing Warunggunung.

On 1 October 1899, Rangkasbitung railway station was inaugurated.

== Communities ==
Rangkasbitung District is sub-divided into five urban kelurahan and eleven rural villages (desa). These are listed below (the 5 kelurahan are distinguished by * after their names) with their areas and their officially-estimated populations as at mid 2023, together with their postcodes.

Kode Wilayah	Name of desa	Area in km^{2}	Population mid 2023 estimate	Post code
36.02.14.2001	Pasir Tanjung	12.94	6,154	42312
36.02.14.1002	Rangkasbitung Barat *	1.35	7,825	42312
36.02.14.1006	Cijoro Lebak *	1.70	12,808	42317
36.02.14.1007	Muara Ciujung Barat *	1.03	9,569	42311
36.02.14.1008	Cijoro Pasir *	3.65	11,551	42316
36.02.14.2009	Citeras	6.12	8,882	42312
36.02.14.2010	Nameng	6.76	7,074	42312
36.02.14.2011	Kolelet Wetan	2.39	4,930	42312
36.02.14.1012	Muara Ciujung Timur *	1.92	19,781	42314
36.02.14.2013	Jatimulya	1.84	8,435	42315
36.02.14.2014	Mekarsari	5.27	6,843	42312
36.02.14.2016	Pabuaran	2.98	5,467	42312
36.02.14.2017	Rangkasbitung Timur	8.25	14,641	42313
36.02.14.2019	Sukamanah	4.82	6,116	42312
36.02.14.2021	Cimangeunteung	10.67	5,810	42312
36.02.14.2023	Narimbang Mulia	2.54	7,947	42319
36.02.14	Totals	74.22	144,733	

== Climate ==
Rangkasbitung has a tropical rainforest climate (Af) with heavy rainfall year-round.

Climate data for Rangkasbitung
Month	Jan	Feb	Mar	Apr	May	Jun	Jul	Aug	Sep	Oct	Nov	Dec	Year
Mean daily maximum °C (°F)	30.7 (87.3)	31.1 (88.0)	31.6 (88.9)	32.2 (90.0)	32.5 (90.5)	32.4 (90.3)	32.5 (90.5)	32.6 (90.7)	33.0 (91.4)	33.1 (91.6)	32.6 (90.7)	31.9 (89.4)	32.2 (89.9)
Daily mean °C (°F)	26.7 (80.1)	27.0 (80.6)	27.2 (81.0)	27.5 (81.5)	27.7 (81.9)	27.3 (81.1)	27.1 (80.8)	27.0 (80.6)	27.5 (81.5)	27.8 (82.0)	27.7 (81.9)	27.4 (81.3)	27.3 (81.2)
Mean daily minimum °C (°F)	22.8 (73.0)	22.9 (73.2)	22.8 (73.0)	22.9 (73.2)	23.0 (73.4)	22.3 (72.1)	21.8 (71.2)	21.5 (70.7)	22.0 (71.6)	22.5 (72.5)	22.9 (73.2)	23.0 (73.4)	22.5 (72.5)
Average rainfall mm (inches)	321 (12.6)	245 (9.6)	242 (9.5)	219 (8.6)	184 (7.2)	113 (4.4)	136 (5.4)	144 (5.7)	144 (5.7)	182 (7.2)	190 (7.5)	219 (8.6)	2,339 (92)
Source: Climate-Data.org

== Transportation ==
The town lies on the road connecting Jakarta, Serpong and Pandeglang. It is also connected with western railway line of Java, connecting Jakarta with Serang until Merak. The town is served by Jakarta Metrorail.

Rangkasbitung is passed the Serang-Panimbang Toll Road. This strategic highway connects From Jakarta, Tangerang, Serang, and the planned extension until to Panimbang Connects Carita Beach, Tanjung Lesung, Ujung Kulon National Park, boosting accessibility and regional development.

Toll Road	Toll Gate
Serang-Panimbang Toll Road	Rangkasbitung KM 90 Exit From Serang, Tangerang, Jakarta; Rangkasbitung KM 90 Exit From Cikulur, Pandeglang, Panimbang

== Notable residents ==
- Eduard Douwes Dekker or Multatuli, the author of Max Havelaar, once lived and worked in the town. His experience and observation during his time here triggered him to write the famous romance.
- Eugenia van Beers, the mother of American rock musicians Eddie van Halen and Alex van Halen was born in this town.
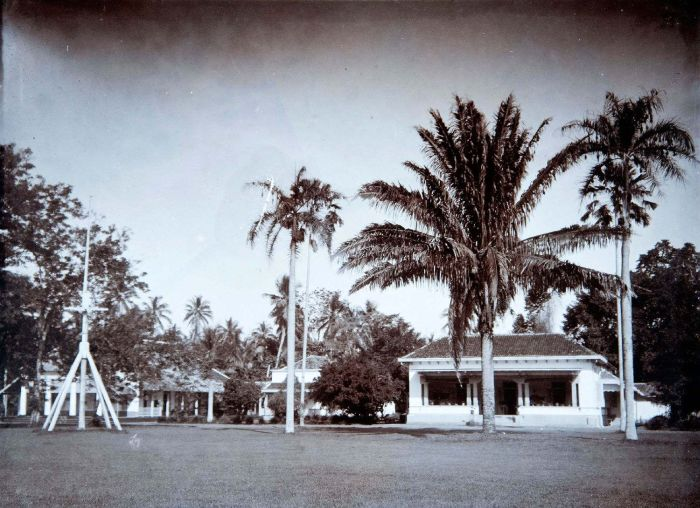
House of assistant-resident of Lebak in Rangkasbitung, where Eduard Douwes Dekker once lived.

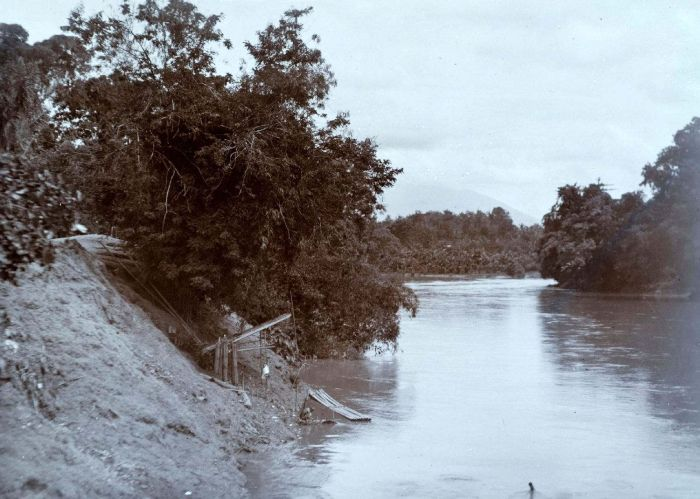
The Ciberang and Ciujung rivers coming together at Rangkasbitung
