= Dolorosa Sinaga =

Indonesian sculptor

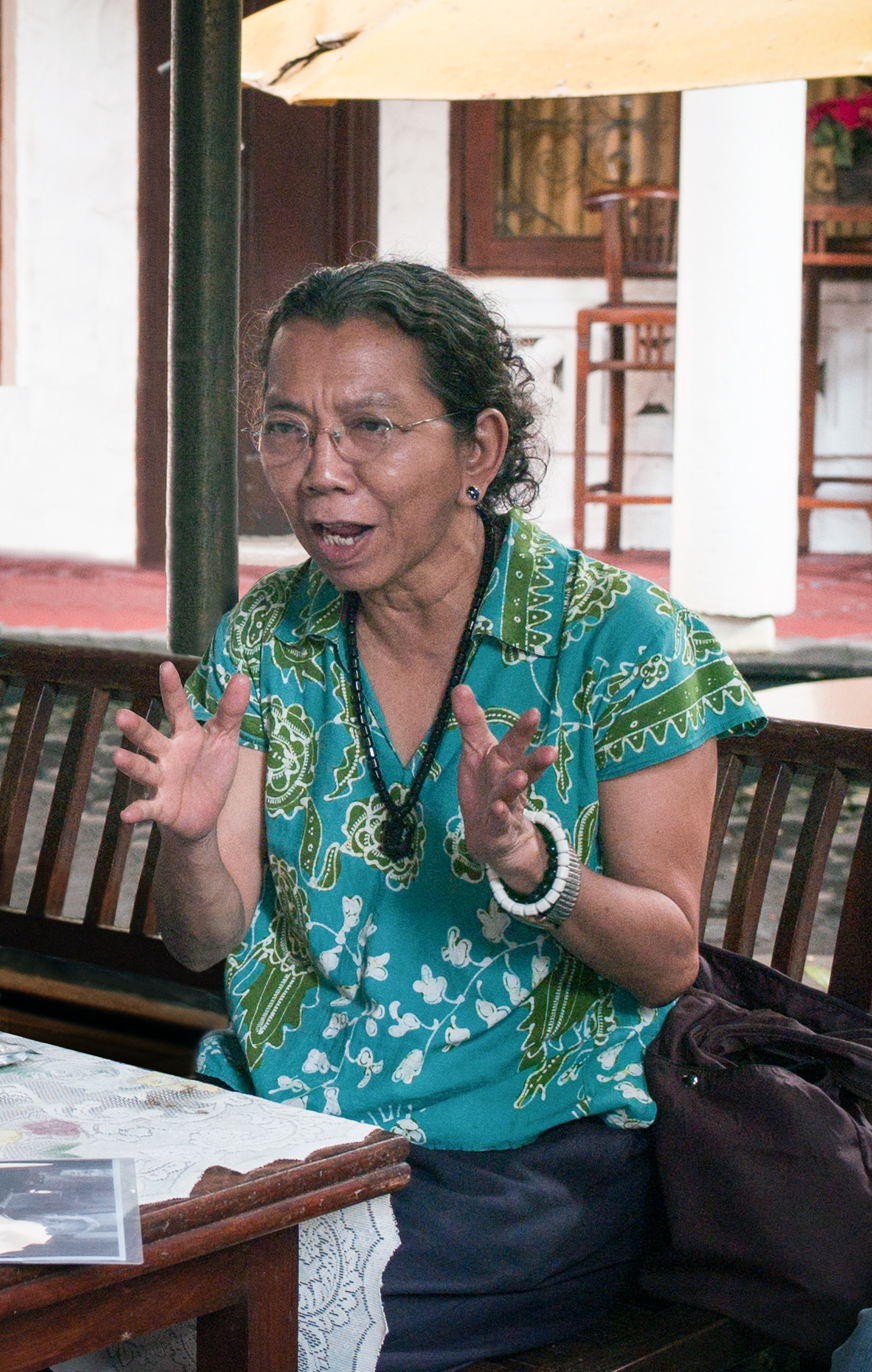
- A 2016 photo of Dolorosa Sinaga
- Born: 1952 (age 73–74); Sibolga, North Sumatra, Indonesia
- Education: Jakarta Institute for the Arts; Saint Martin's School of Art
- Known for: Sculpture, Activist

Dolorosa Sinaga (born 1952) is an Indonesian sculptor, feminist and human rights activist. She was previously dean of the faculty of fine arts at the Institut Kesenian Jakarta and founder of the Somalaing Art Studio which she has operated in Jakarta since 1987. Her works appear in the National Gallery of Indonesia and internationally.

== Biography ==
=== Early life and education ===
Dolorosa Sinaga was born in Sibolga, North Sumatra, Indonesia on 31 October 1952 or possibly 1953. She was born into a Christian Batak family; both her parents had Dutch-language educations during the colonial era. Her family relocated to Medan and then Palembang during her childhood. She developed an early interest in art, but according to an interview she did not have a natural talent for it, and was rejected from the Bandung Institute of Technology. She enrolled at a new institution in Jakarta, the Lembaga Pendidikan Kesenian Jakarta (Jakarta arts education institute, now called Institut Kesenian Jakarta, Jakarta institute of fine arts). At the time she was only one of four female students. She graduated in 1977 and then obtained a scholarship to study abroad at Saint Martin's School of Art in London, where she graduated with a master's degree in 1983. During her years in London she also visited Italy and other European countries to observe historical works of art, and became particularly influenced by the work of Alberto Giacometti. She pursued further studies in Ljubljana, Yugoslavia, and studied various sculpture techniques around the United States, including in Berkeley, California, Maryland, and Florida.

=== Career in art and activism ===
Upon her return to Jakarta in the 1980s, she wanted to have a place to work, so she founded the Somalaing Art Studio. She initially worked out of the guard house of her family's home, but soon built a larger studio on another piece of land owned by her family in Jakarta. In the new space, she gradually expanded her operation until she was supervising a team of more than a dozen assistants. She named the studio after Guru Somalaing Pardede, a historical Batak warrior and religious leader who accompanied the Italian anthropologist Elio Modigliani on his travels in Sumatra in the nineteenth century.

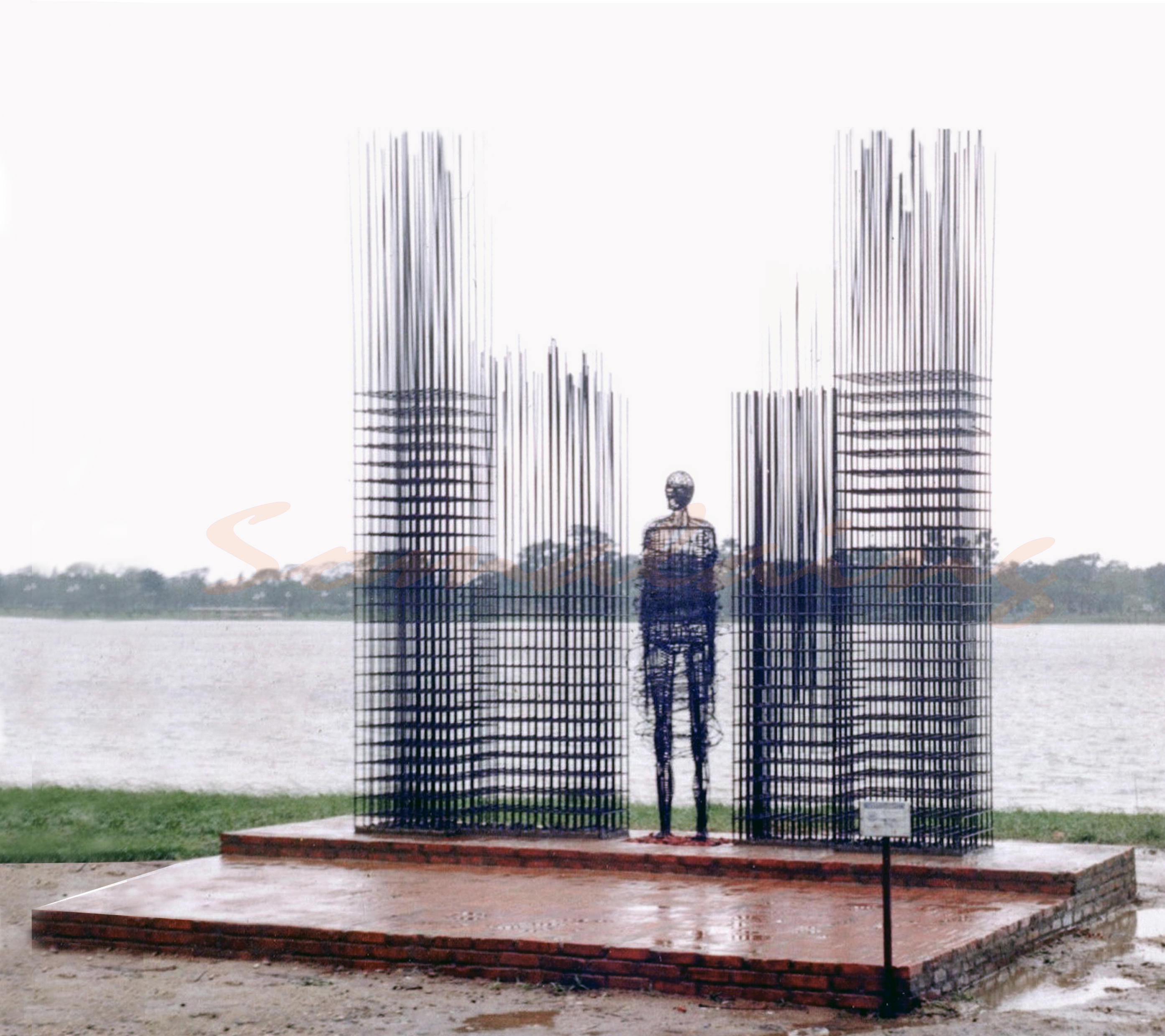
Theme for Us Today: The Crisis (1998)

She was one of the first Indonesian women sculptors to create bronze sculptures; she has also used clay, fiberglass, plastics, and a variety of other materials. Her work incorporates themes of liberation, pain, injustice, women's resistance and solidarity. Among her better-known sculptures are Semangat Angkatan 66 (The Spirit of the generation of '66) in Kuningan, South Jakarta and Solidaritas (Solidarity, 2000) which is located at the National Commission on Violence Against Women (Komnas Perempuan); a replica is in the International Monetary Fund building in Washington, D.C. Another well-known piece is Theme for Us Today: The Crisis, an imposing rod iron work she created for the Second International Sculpture Symposium in Huế, Vietnam in 1998. A replica of that piece was created for the International Sculpture Park in Siena, Italy. More recently, she designed the sculpture at the center of a monument to former Indonesian president Sukarno in Algiers; the overall monument was designed by Ridwan Kamil.

Throughout her career Sinaga has been involved in a number of social movements. She cofounded Koalisi Seni (The Indonesian Arts Coalition), an arts nonprofit organization. And she was media coordinator and a steering committee member of the People's Tribunal on 1965 Crimes against Humanity in Indonesia which was convened in The Hague in 2015. In 2016 she helped co-organize a left-wing festival called Turn Left Festival which was banned by police. She also produced a documentary, directed by Rahung Nasution, called Pulau Buru Tanah Air Beta (Buru Island, my Homeland). In 2016 she also curated an exhibition in Jakarta of art focusing on the historical experience of Indonesian Comfort women during World War II. Most recently, she is a part of an exhibition titled “Fear No Power: Women Imagining Otherwise” at the National Gallery Singapore, an exhibition showcasing five Southeast Asian women artists.
