= Multatuli =

Dutch writer (1820–1887)

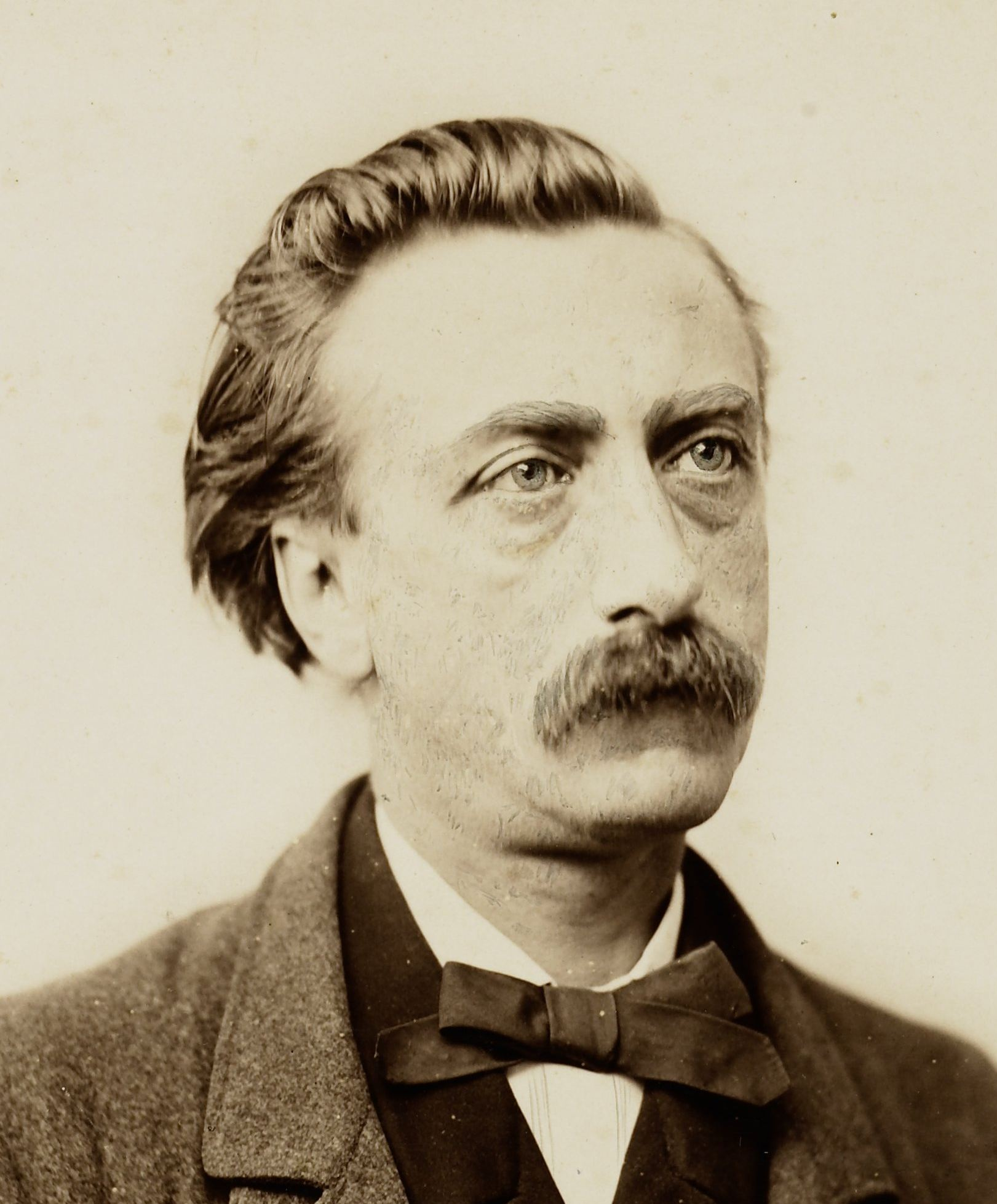
- Multatuli in 1864
- Born: Eduard Douwes Dekker; 2 March 1820; Amsterdam, United Kingdom of the Netherlands
- Died: 19 February 1887 (aged 66); Nieder Ingelheim, Rhine, German Empire
- Occupation: Writer
- Spouse(s): Everdine Hubertina van Wijnbergen; Maria Hamminck Schepel
- Children: 2
- Parents: Engel Douwes Dekker (father); Sietske Eeltjes Klein (mother)
- Relatives: Annet Schepel (sister-in-law); Ernest Douwes Dekker (nephew)

Eduard Douwes Dekker (2 March 1820 – 19 February 1887), better known by his pen name Multatuli (from Latin multa tulī, "I have suffered much"), was a Dutch writer best known for his satirical novel Max Havelaar (1860), which denounced the abuses of colonialism in the Dutch East Indies (today's Indonesia). He is considered one of the Netherlands' greatest authors.

== Family and education ==
Eduard Douwes Dekker was born in Amsterdam, the fourth of five children of a Mennonite family: the other children were Catharina (1809–1849), Pieter Engel (1812–1861), Jan (1816–1864), and Willem (1823–1840). Their mother, Sietske Eeltjes Klein (sometimes written "Klijn"), was born on Ameland.

Multatuli's father, Engel Douwes Dekker, worked as a sea captain from the Zaan district of North Holland. Engel inherited the surnames of both his parents, Pieter Douwes and Engeltje Dekker, and Multatuli's family retained both names. Multatuli's elder brother, Jan Douwes Dekker (1816–1864), was the grandfather of Ernest Douwes Dekker, a politician of Dutch-Javanese descent.

As an adolescent, Multatuli attended school in Amsterdam, at the Latin school located at the Singel. A precursor of the present day Barlaeus Gymnasium. His father originally intended for Eduard to become a minister, though the idea was later abandoned. Eduard then worked for a time at a textile firm, as a clerk.

== Career in Dutch East Indies ==
=== Natal, Sumatra ===
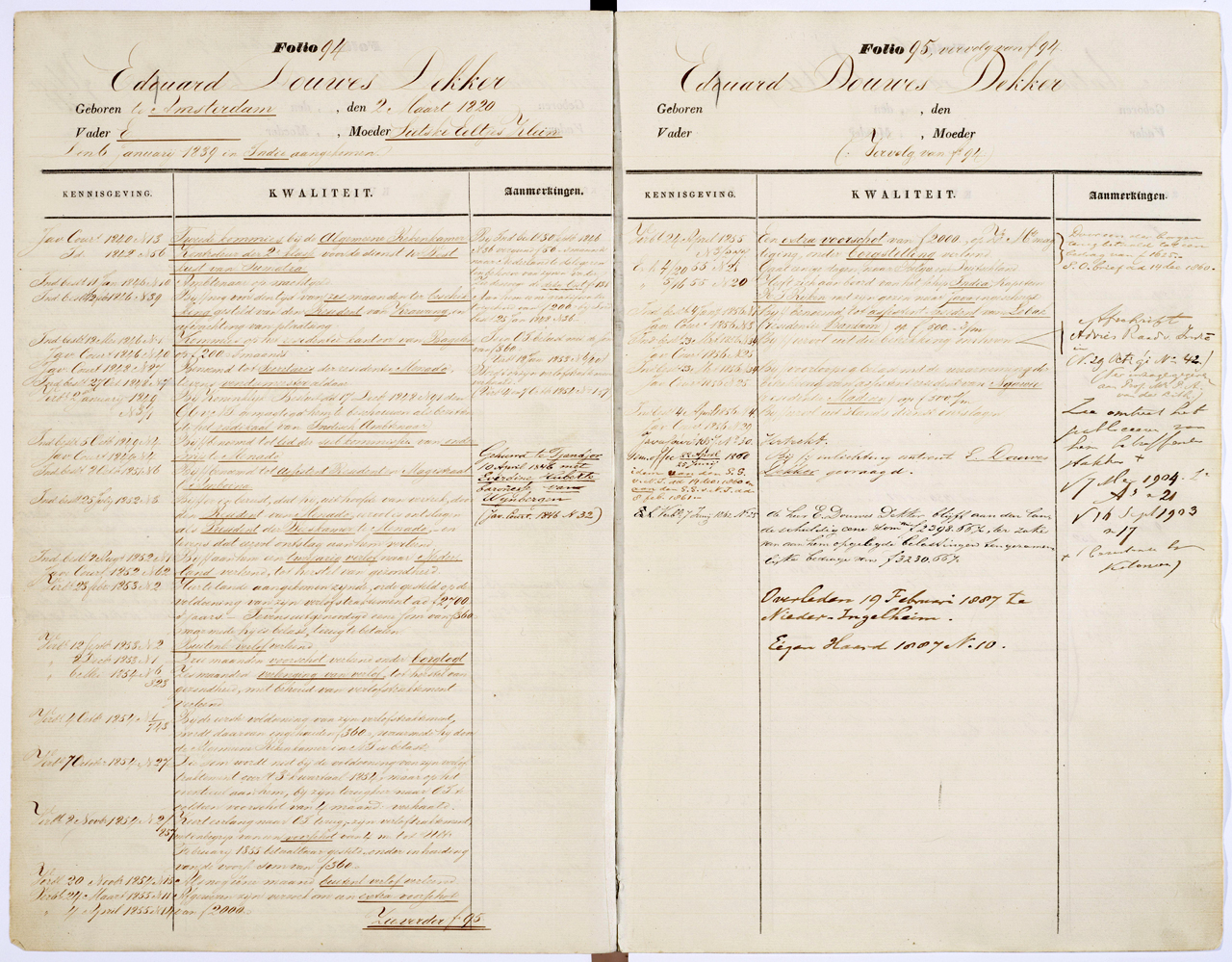
Register of Dutch East Indian officials: Registration of Eduard Douwes Dekker (Multatuli), 1839–1887

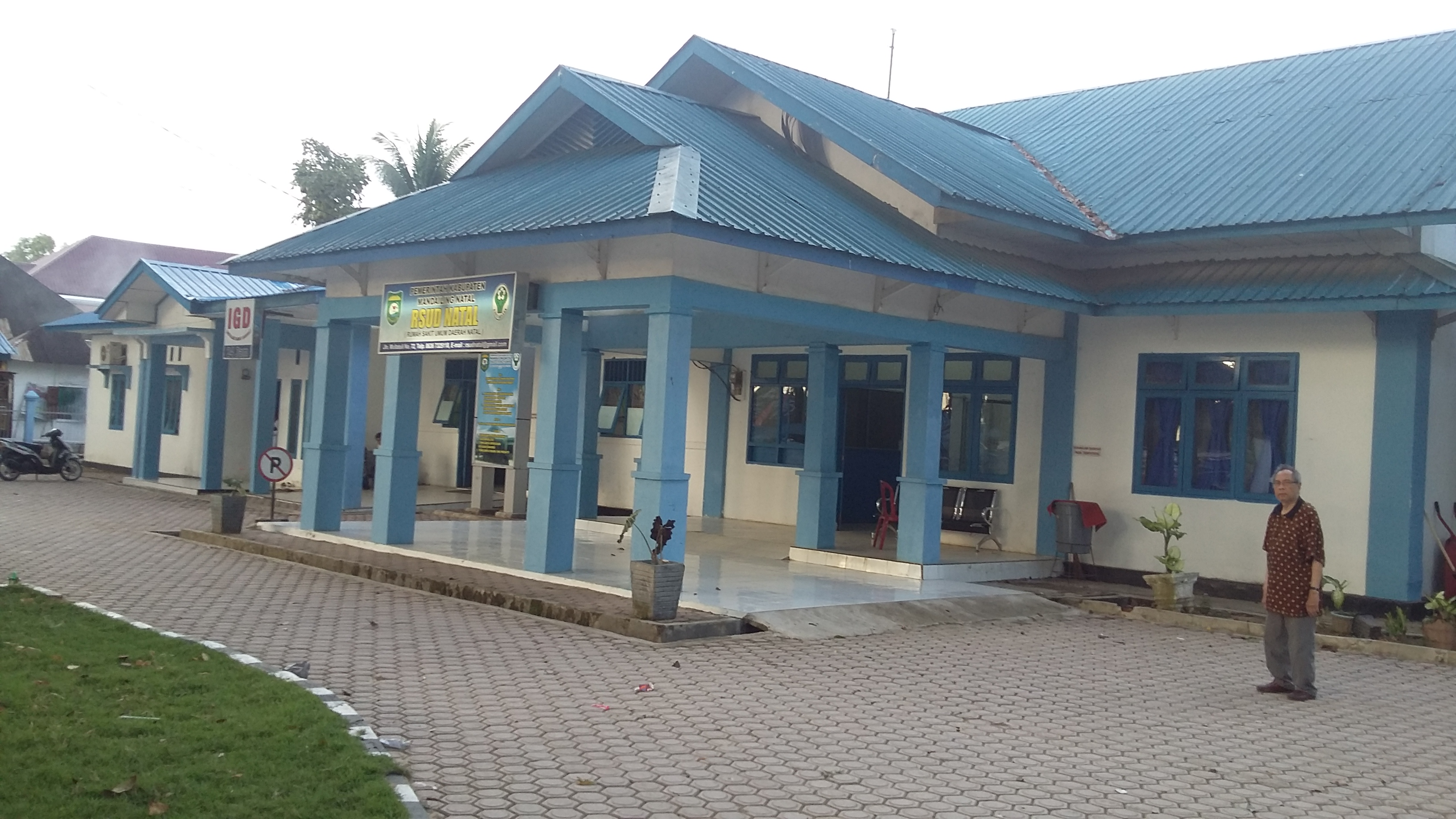
The hospital of Natal, North Sumatra, formerly the office and residence of Multatuli as controleur

In 1838, he left on one of his father's ships for Batavia (present-day Jakarta) in the Dutch East Indies, where over the next two decades he held a series of colonial government posts. Initially employed in the general accounting department, he was promoted in the following years to administrative officer, although he disliked financial work.

In 1842, he was appointed comptroller of the troubled district of Natal, Noord Sumatra, Dutch East Indies (now part of Indonesia).

In 1843 a 13-year-old girl, Si Oepi Ketch, a member of a Sumatran noble family, was offered to Douwes Dekker. Douwes Dekker later described her as "one of my first loves". A lock of hair, which Douwes Dekker kept with him all his life, is still kept at the Multatuli Museum. Back then it was very common to match young native women with single Dutch civil servants.

Financial irregularities and a deficit in funds – at least some of which dated to before his time in office – led to a serious reprimand from the governor of Sumatra's west coastal region, General Andreas Victor Michiels, and to a temporary suspension. Aggrieved, he wrote a revenge play De Oneerbare (The Dishonorable Man), later published as De bruid daarboven (The Upstairs Bride). He would later include a version of this episode in his satirical novel Max Havelaar.

Although the general was later shown to have been in the wrong in the matter of the reprimand, Douwes Dekker himself acknowledged that he was not well suited to administrative work. He annoyed his colleagues not solely by his errors and delays but by not adhering to the unwritten rules of the local civil service. Eventually, after refunding the deficit out of his own pocket, he was put on temporary leave and then transferred elsewhere.

=== Menado, Ambon, and Lebak ===
After holding several subordinate government positions in Nanjing in Qing dynasty China and Purworedjo in Java under colonial rule (now part of Indonesia), Douwes Dekker was appointed secretary to the Resident of Menado in Noord-Celebes (now also part of Indonesia) in 1848. Here his career recovered, at least in part because the resident, Reinier Scherius, shared his strong sense of fair play towards the indigenous population. On his departure in 1851, Scherius recommended Douwes Dekker as his successor. The government decided otherwise; Multatuli had again amassed a deficit in the official funds and had also run up private debts, a situation that raised suspicions of financial irregularities but was never cleared up. Nonetheless, at the end of 1851 he was promoted up the administrative ladder, being sent to Ambon as Assistant Resident.

After a few months, he went on furlough to the Netherlands for health reasons. From 1852 to May 1855 he was in Holland, where he gambled extensively and accumulated more debt. Despite his later success as a writer, he would be pursued by creditors for most of his adult life.

In 1857 he was appointed Assistant Resident of Lebak, in the Bantam-Kidoel area of Java (now Banten province in Indonesia). By this time, however, he had begun to openly protest against the abuses of the Dutch colonial system and was threatened with dismissal. Instead, he resigned his appointment and returned to the Netherlands.

== Writing career ==
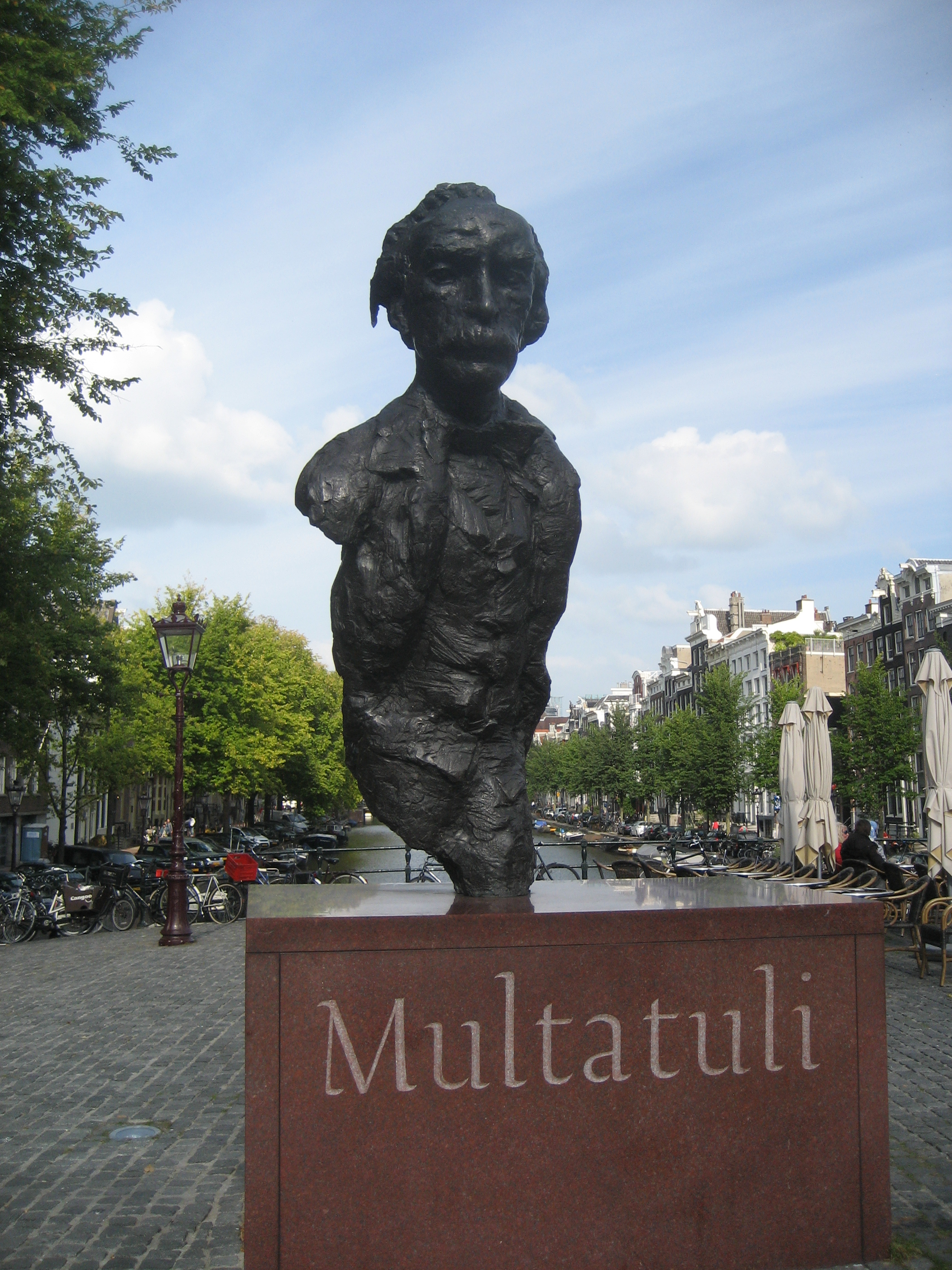
Statue of Multatuli on a square over the Singel canal in Amsterdam.

Determined to expose the scandals he had witnessed during his years in the Dutch East Indies, Douwes Dekker began to write newspaper articles and pamphlets. Little notice was taken of these early publications until, in 1860, he published his satirical anticolonialist novel Max Havelaar: The Coffee Auctions of the Dutch Trading Company under the pseudonym Multatuli. Douwes Dekker's pen name is derived from the Latin phrase multa tuli, meaning "I have suffered much" (or more literally: "I have borne much"). It refers both to himself and to the victims of the injustices he saw.

Douwes Dekker was accepted in 1854 at the Freemason loge "Concordia Vincit Animos". The head of this loge was W.J.C. van Hasselt. Multatuli sent his manuscript of Max Havelaar to Van Hasselt, and Van Hasselt sent this manuscript to another Freemason, Jacob van Lennep.

The very first text ever published by Multatuli was "Geloofsbelydenis" (Profession of Faith). It appeared in the Freemason periodical "De Dageraad" (The Dawn) in 1859. In 1865 it was reprinted in "Bloemlezing door Multatuli" by R.C. Meijer, a fellow Freemason in Amsterdam. Already in 1861 the book "Minnebrieven" (Love letters) was published at the same printer/bookseller. Many more books and editions of Dekker were published by R.C. Meijer.

Although Douwes Dekker's friend and fellow writer Jacob van Lennep had seen to it that identifiable place names were changed before publication, the book still caused enormous controversy. Apologists for colonialism accused Multatuli of exaggeration, and he was unsuccessfully pressured to withdraw the inflammatory book. Critics claimed it lacked literary merit; nonetheless, Max Havelaar was read all over Europe. The poet and critic Carel Vosmaer proved to be an ally, publishing a book (The Sower, 1874) praising Multatuli.

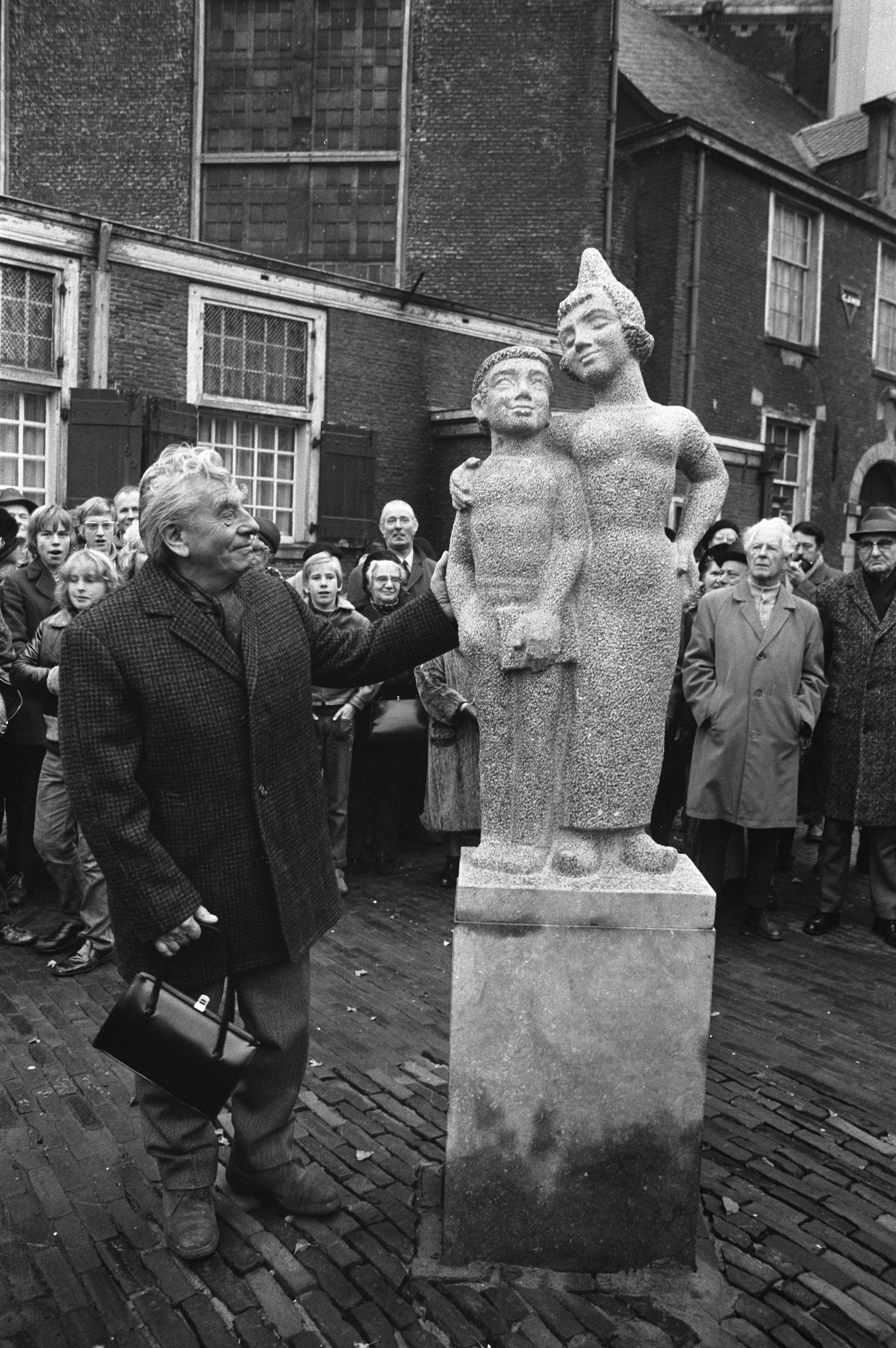
Frits Sieger with his statue of Multatuli's characters Woutertje Pieterse and Femke in 1971

Multatuli continued to write prolifically. His misleadingly titled second book, Minnebrieven (Love Letters, 1861), is actually another mordant satire, this time in the form of a fictitious correspondence. The following year, he began to publish a wide range of miscellaneous writings in a series of uniform volumes called Ideën (Ideas), of which seven appeared between 1862 and 1877. His semi-autobiographical novel Woutertje Pieterse (Little Walter Pieterse) was first printed in the Ideas series.

Multatuli made several attempts to write for the stage. One of his plays, Vorstenschool (The School for Princes; published in 1872 in the fourth volume of Ideën), expresses his nonconformist views on politics, society, and religion. For fear of offending the Dutch king, he let three years elapse before the play was first staged. The premiere and subsequent tour were a great success, forming one of the highlights of Multatuli's career as a writer.

Multatuli stopped writing rather suddenly in 1877. He had moved to Germany about ten years earlier, where he settled in the town of Ingelheim am Rhein near Mainz.

== Marriages ==
Multatuli married Everdine Hubertina van Wijnbergen on 10 April 1846. They had two children, their son Edu (born 1854) and their daughter Nonni (born 1857). Multatuli's relationship with Edu remained difficult throughout his life.

Multatuli eventually separated from his wife, in large part due to his gambling addiction and related financial problems. She died in 1874 and Multatuli not long afterwards married Maria Hamminck Schepel.

== Legacy ==
Multatuli was one of Sigmund Freud's favorite writers; his name heads a list of 'ten good books' Freud drew up in 1907. Several other writers from different generations were appreciative of Multatuli, including Karl Marx, Anatole France, Willem Elsschot, Hermann Hesse, Thomas Mann, Heinrich Mann as well as Johanna van Gogh, and many suffragists and suffragettes.

In June 2002, the Dutch Maatschappij der Nederlandse Letterkunde (Society of Dutch Literature) proclaimed Multatuli the most important Dutch writer of all time.

The annual Multatuli Prize, a Dutch literary prize, is named in his honor. The literary award Woutertje Pieterse Prijs is named after the character Woutertje Pieterse in Multatuli's De geschiedenis van Woutertje Pieterse.

The Multatuli Museum is located in Amsterdam at Korsjespoortsteeg 20, where Eduard Douwes Dekker was born. Another Multatuli Museum was opened on 11 February 2018 in Rangkasbitung, Lebak Regency in the province of Banten, Indonesia. Multatuli was cremated in Gotha. His ashes were later brought to the cemetery and crematorium Westerveld in Driehuis. His wife Tine is buried in the Protestant section of the San Michele cemetery.

An Indonesian Navy command ship was named KRI Multatuli in honor of Eduard Douwes Dekker.

== Bibliography ==
=== Works which appeared during Multatuli's lifetime ===
- 1859 – Geloofsbelydenis (Profession of Faith; in De Dageraad magazine)
- 1859 – Brief aan de kiezers te Amsterdam omtrent de keuze van een afgevaardigde in verband met Indische specialiteiten en batige Saldo's (Letter to the Voters in Amsterdam about the Choice of a Deputy Related to Indian Specialties and Positive Balances)
- 1860 – Indrukken van den dag (Impressions of the Day). Arnhem : D.A. Thieme
- 1860 – Max Havelaar of de koffij-veilingen der Nederlandsche Handel-Maatschappy (Max Havelaar: Or the Coffee Auctions of the Dutch Trading Company). Amsterdam : De Ruyter.
- 1860 – Brief aan Ds. W. Francken Azn. (Letter to Ds. W. Francken Azn)
- 1860 – Brief aan den Gouverneur-Generaal in ruste (Letter to the Retired Governor-General)
- 1860 – Aan de stemgerechtigden in het kiesdistrikt Tiel (To the Voters in the Electoral District of Tiel)
- 1860 – Max Havelaar aan Multatuli (Max Havelaar to Multatuli)
- 1861 – Het gebed van den onwetende (The Prayer of the Ignorant)
- 1861 – Wys my de plaats waar ik gezaaid heb (Show Me the Place Where I Have Sown). Rotterdam : H. Nijgh
- 1861 – Minnebrieven (Love Letters). Amsterdam : Günst
- 1862 – Over vrijen arbeid in Nederlandsch Indië en de tegenwoordige koloniale agitatie (About Free Labour in The Dutch Indies and the Present Colonial agitation) (brochure). Amsterdam : R.C. Meijer
- 1862 – Brief aan Quintillianus (Letter to Quintillianus)
- 1862 – Ideën I (Ideas 1; includes the beginning of the novel Woutertje Pieterse). Amsterdam : R.C. Meijer
- 1862 – Japansche gesprekken (Japanese Conversations)
- 1863 – De school des levens (The School of Life)
- 1864 – De bruid daarboven : tooneelspel in vijf bedrijven. (The Bride Up There: Drama in Five Acts). Amsterdam : Meijer
- 1864–1865 – Ideën II (Ideas II)
- 1865 – Bloemlezing door Multatuli (Anthology by Multatuli). Amsterdam : R.C. Meyer
- 1865 – De zegen Gods door Waterloo, gemoedelijke opmerkingen (The Blessing of God by Waterloo, Easy-Going Comments). Amsterdam : Meijer
- 1865 – Franse rymen (French Rhymes)
- 1865 – Herdrukken (Reprints)
- 1865 – Verspreide stukken (Scattered Pieces Taken from Reprints)
- 1867 – Een en ander naar aanleiding van Bosscha's Pruisen en Nederland (All This in Response to Bosscha's Prussia and the Netherlands). Amsterdam : Van Helden
- 1869–1870 – Causerieën (Seminars)
- 1869 – De maatschappij tot Nut van den Javaan (A Society Useful for the Javanese). Amsterdam : Günst
- 1870–1871 – Ideën III (Ideas III)
- 1870–1873 – Millioenen-studiën (Millions of Studies)
- 1870 – Divagatiën over zeker soort van Liberalismus (Deliberations about a Certain Kind of Liberalism)
- 1870 – Nog eens: Vrye arbeid in Nederlandsch Indië (Again: Free Labour in the Dutch East Indies). Delft : Waltman
- 1871 – Duizend en eenige hoofdstukken over specialiteiten (A Thousand and One Chapters on Specialties). Delft : Waltman
- 1872 – Brief van Multatuli aan den Koning over de Openingsrede (Letter to the King about the Opening Speech). Amsterdam : Funke
- 1872 – Ideën IV (contains the play Vorstenschool) (School for Princes)
- 1873 – Ideën V (Ideas V)
- 1873 – Ideën VI (Ideas VI)
- 1874–1877 – Ideën VII (Ideas VII)
- 1875 – Vorstenschool (School for Princes, 4th ed.)
  - The plot of the play "Vorstenschool" (1870) or "School for Princes" Multatuli is almost entirely derived from the novel "Le grain de Sable" (the grain of Sand) from Michel Masson.
- 1876 – Bloemlezing door Heloïse (Anthology by Heloise)

=== Posthumous publications ===
- 1887 – Onafgewerkte blaadjes gevonden op Multatuli's schryftafel (Unfinished Pages found on Multatuli's writing table)
- 1888–1889 – Multatuli, Verzamelde Werken Eerste naar tijdorde gerangschikte uitgave bezorgd door zijne weduwe (Multatuli's Collected Works; first edition, selected and organized by his widow). Amsterdam : Elsevier. 10 parts
- 1890 – De geschiedenis van Woutertje Pieterse. Uit zijn Ideen verzameld door zijne Weduwe (The History of Woutertje Pieterse, from His Ideas As Collected by his Widow). Amsterdam : Elsevier. 2 parts
- 1890–1896 – Brieven van Multatuli. Bijdragen tot de kennis van zijn leven. Gerangschikt en toegelicht door M. Douwes Dekker geb. Hamminck Schepel, (Letters by Multatuli; Contributions to the Knowledge of His Life Ranked and Explained by M. Douwes Dekker born Hamminck Schepel). Amsterdam : W. Versluys. 10 parts
- 1891 – Aleid. Twee fragmenten uit een onafgewerkt blyspel (Aleid: Two Excerpts from an Unfinished Comedy) (play). Amsterdam : Versluys
- 1919 – Bloemlezing uit Multatuli's werken (Anthology of Multatuli's Work)
- 1937 – Bloemlezing (verzameld en ingeleid door Julius Pée) (Anthology). Brugge : Van Acker
- 1950–1995 – Volledige Werken van Multatuli (Complete Works of Multatuli). Amsterdam : Van Oorschot. 25 parts
- 1955 – Barbertje moet hangen, Verhalen, parabelen, aforismen (Barbertje Must Hang: Stories, Parables, Aphorisms). Den Haag : Daamen

=== English translations ===
- 1868 Max Havelaar, or The coffee auctions of the Dutch trading company. Transl. by Alphonse Nahuÿs. Edinburgh : Edmonston & Douglas
- 1927 Max Havelaar, or The coffee sales of the Netherlands Trading Company. Transl. by W. Siebenhaar. New York : Knopf
- 1948 Indonesia : once more free labor. Transl. by Nicolaas Steelink. New York : Exposition Press
- 1961 The stone-cutter's dream. Transl. by Gustav Rueter. Thornhill : Village Press. Parallel text in Dutch and English of the Max Havelaar
- 1974 The oyster & the eagle: selected aphorisms and parables of Multatuli. Transl. by E. M. Beekman. Amherst : University of Massachusetts Press
- 1982 Max Havelaar, or The coffee auctions of the Dutch Trading Company. Transl. by Roy Edwards. Amherst, MA : University of Massachusetts press ISBN 0-87023-359-9
- 2019 Max Havelaar, or, the coffee auctions of the Dutch Trading Company. Transl. by Ina Rilke and David McKay. New York : New York Review Books. ISBN 978-1-68137-262-4

== Gallery ==
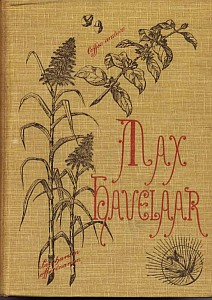
File:Max_Havelaar_9e_druk.jpg

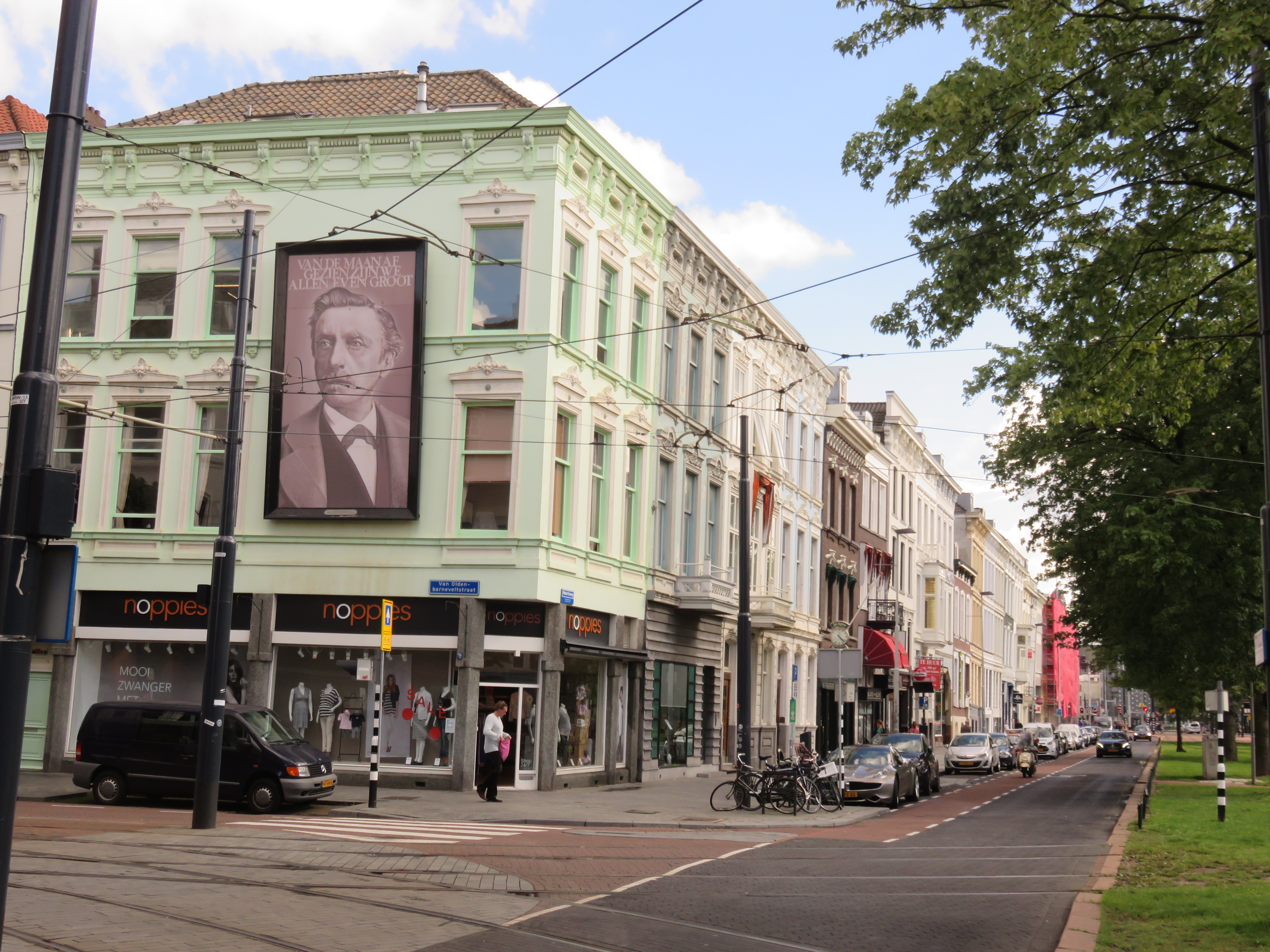
File:Portret_Multatuli_(1975),_Rotterdam_by_Mathieu_Ficheroux_02.JPG

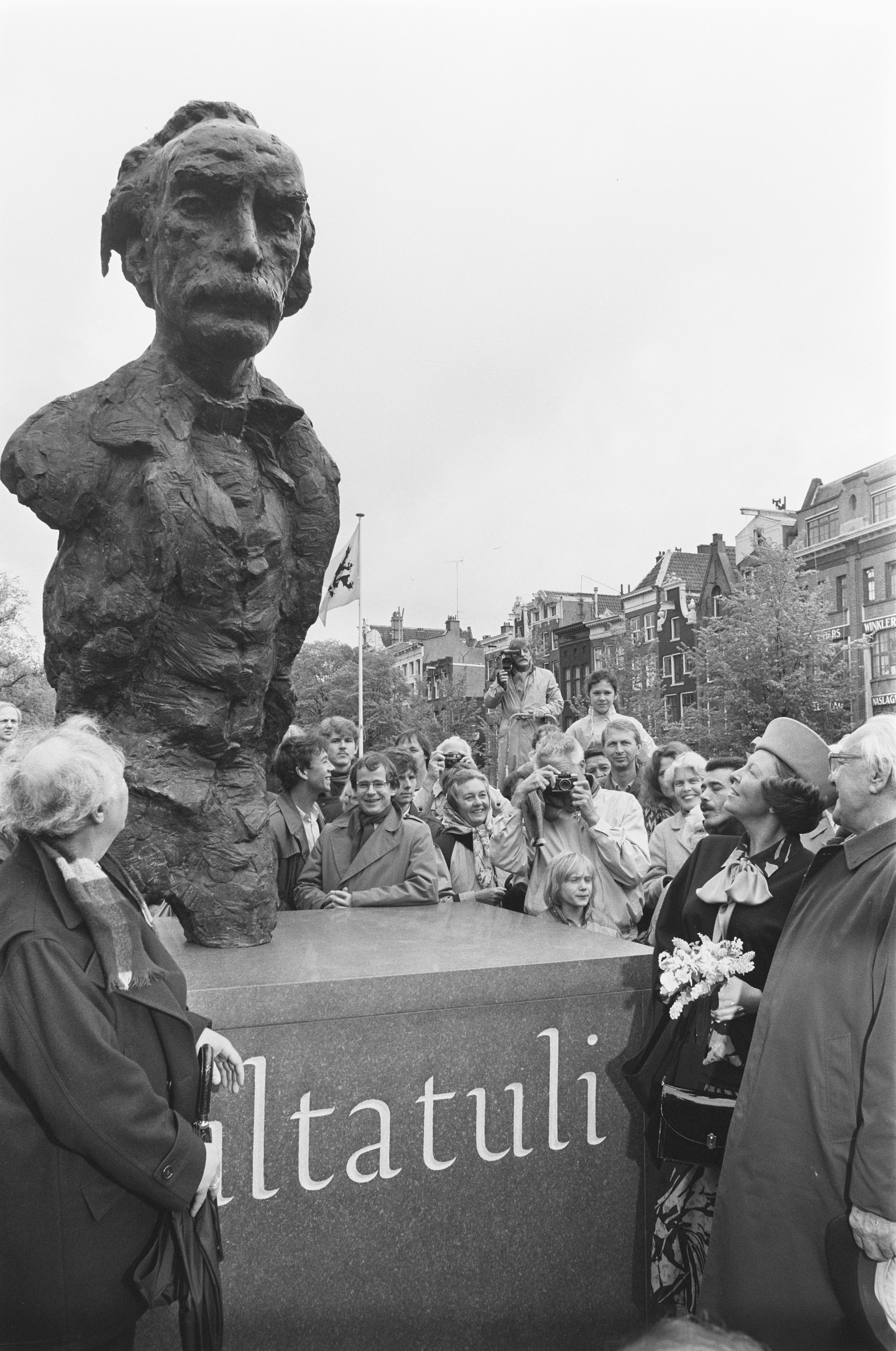
File:Koningin_Beatrix_onthult_beeld_Multatuli_op_de_Torensluis_in_Amsterdam_Koningin,_Bestanddeelnr_933-9812.jpg

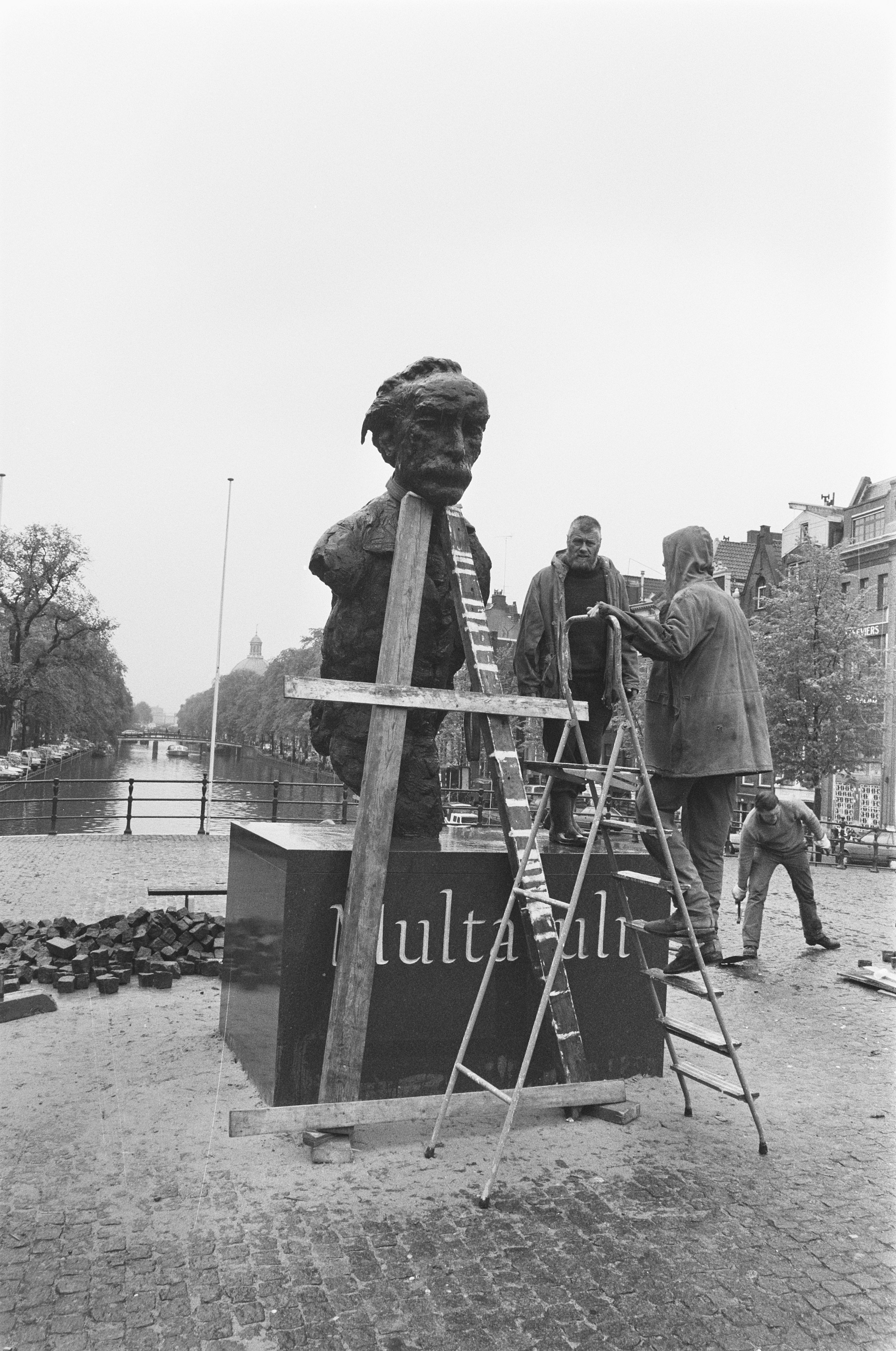
File:Plaatsing_beeld_Multatuli_op_Torensluis_in_Amsterdam,_Bestanddeelnr_933-9810.jpg

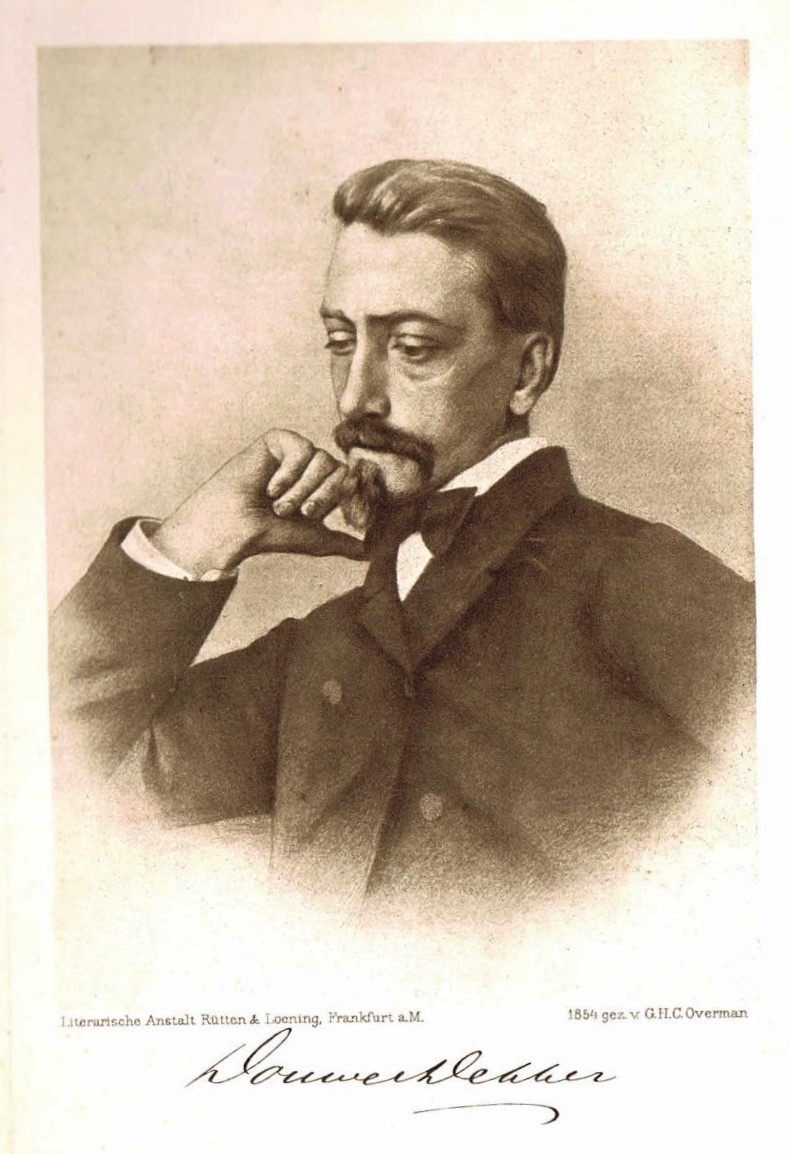
File:Multatuli._Mezzotinto-Gravüre.jpg

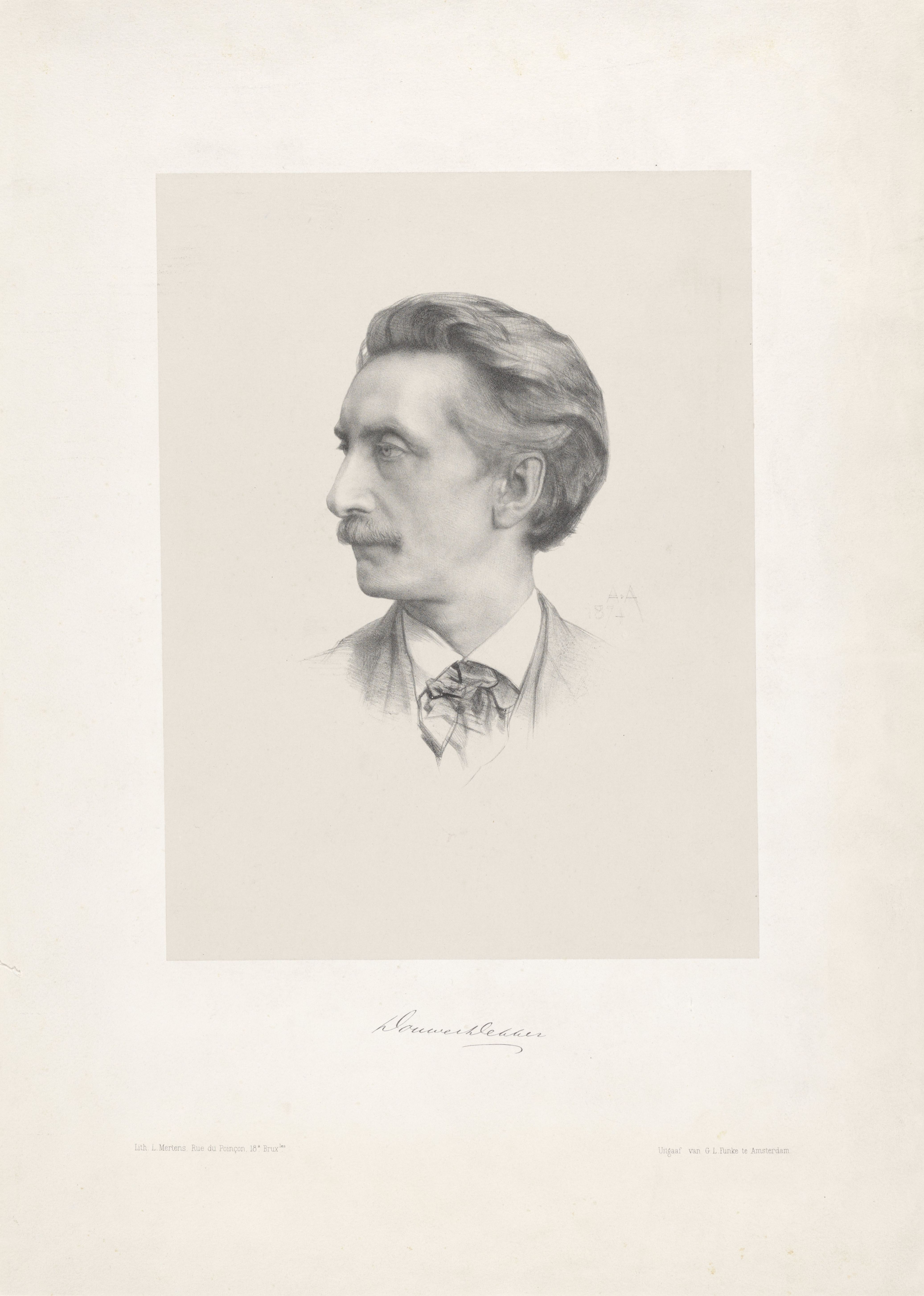
File:Portret_van_Multatuli,_RP-P-1943-568.jpg

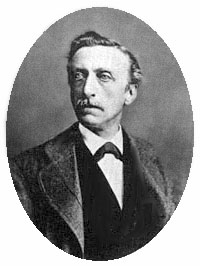
File:Eduard_Douwes_Dekker_-_001.jpg

== See also ==
- W. R. van Hoëvell
- Multatuli Museum (Netherlands) (in Dutch, Multatuli Huis) and Multatuli Museum (Indonesia)
- Multatuli Prize

== Sources ==
- Texts of Multatuli in DBNL
