= Max Havelaar =

1860 novel by Multatuli

Max Havelaar; or, The Coffee Auctions of the Dutch Trading Company
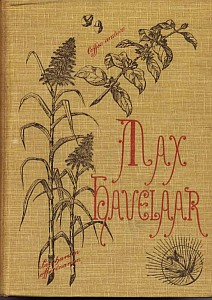
- Front cover of Max Havelaar, 5th edition (1881)
- Author: Multatuli
- Original title: Max Havelaar, of de koffiveilingen der Nederlandsche Handelmaatschappij
- Language: Dutch; Indonesian (From 1972)
- Genre: Political Novel
- Publisher: J. de Ruyter K.H. Schadd; G.L. Funke; Publishing Company Elsevier; Van Munster and Zonen; Edmonston Bas Lubberhuizen
- Publication date: 1860
- Publication place: Netherlands

Max Havelaar; or, The Coffee Auctions of the Dutch Trading Company (Dutch: Max Havelaar; of, De koffiveilingen der Nederlandsche Handelmaatschappij) is an 1860 novel by Multatuli (the pen name of Eduard Douwes Dekker), which played a key role in shaping and modifying Dutch colonial policy in the Dutch East Indies in the nineteenth and early twentieth century. In the novel, the protagonist, Max Havelaar, tries to battle against a corrupt government system in Java, which was then a Dutch colony. The novel's opening line is famous: "Ik ben makelaar in koffie, en woon op de Lauriergracht, Nº 37." ("I am a coffee broker, and live on the Lauriergracht, Nº 37.").

== Background ==
By the mid-nineteenth century, the colonial control of the Dutch East Indies (present-day Indonesia) had passed from the Dutch East India Company (VOC) to the Dutch government due to the economic failure of the VOC. In order to increase revenue, the Dutch colonial government implemented a series of policies termed the Cultivation System (Dutch: cultuurstelsel), which mandated Indonesian farmers to grow a quota of commercial crops such as sugar and coffee, instead of growing staple foods such as rice. At the same time, the colonial government implemented a tax collection system where the collecting agents were paid by commission. The combination of these two strategies caused widespread abuse of colonial power, especially on the islands of Java and Sumatra, resulting in abject poverty and widespread starvation of the farmers. The colony was governed with a minimum of soldiers and government officials. The former rulers maintained their absolute power and control over the natives: a quite common strategy used by many colonising countries.

In addition, the Dutch state earned a fortune with the sale of opium to the natives, a practice begun centuries earlier under VOC rule. At that time, opium was the only known effective pain killer, and a considerable percentage of the natives were addicted to it, being kept poor in this way. This was called the "opium-regime". To distinguish between smuggled and legal opium, a simple reagent was added. After discovery the smuggler could count on a severe punishment.

Multatuli wrote Max Havelaar in protest against these colonial policies, but another goal was to seek rehabilitation for his resignation from governmental service. Despite its terse writing style, it raised the awareness of Europeans that the wealth that they enjoyed was the result of suffering in other parts of the world. This awareness eventually formed the motivation for the new Ethical Policy by which the Dutch colonial government attempted to "repay" their debt to their colonial subjects by providing education to some classes of natives, generally members of the elite loyal to the colonial government.

Indonesian novelist Pramoedya Ananta Toer argued that by triggering these educational reforms, Max Havelaar was in turn responsible for the nationalist movement that ended Dutch colonialism in Indonesia after 1945, and which was instrumental in the call for decolonization in Africa and elsewhere in the world. Thus, according to Pramoedya, Max Havelaar is "the book that killed colonialism".

In the last chapter the author announces that he will translate the book "into the few languages I know, and into the many languages I can learn." In fact, Max Havelaar has been translated into thirty-four languages. It was first translated into English in 1868. In Indonesia, the novel was cited as an inspiration by Sukarno and other early nationalist leaders, such as the author's Indo (Eurasian) descendant Ernest Douwes Dekker, who had read it in its original Dutch. It was not translated into Indonesian until 1972.

In the novel, the story of Max Havelaar, a Dutch colonial administrator, is told by two diametrically opposed characters: the hypocritical coffee merchant Batavus Droogstoppel, who intends to use Havelaar's manuscripts to write about the coffee trade, and the romantic German apprentice Stern, who takes over when Droogstoppel loses interest in the story. The opening chapter of the book nicely sets the tone of the satirical nature of what is to follow, with Droogstoppel articulating his pompous and mercenary world-view at length. At the very end of the novel Multatuli himself takes the pen and the book culminates in a denunciation of Dutch colonial policies and a plea to king William III of the Netherlands to intervene on behalf of his Indonesian subjects.

== Plot ==
(This summary seems to be based on the film adaptation, not the book as originally published)

In 1860, Säidjah is a small boy from a farmer's family in Parang Koedjang, Lebak Regency in the Dutch East Indies. He is playing with his carabao when a Javan tiger attacks his carabao, which instead kills the tiger. The farmers name his carabao as "Pantang" (Malay word for "tough"). Not long after that, the group of the Demang (chief district) of Parang Koedjang, Raden Wira Koesoema, arrive and demand that they pay tribute to the Regent because he is displeased. But the farmers do not have money to be collected as tribute, so Demang then seizes "Pantang". Säidjah's elder brother tries to fight against the Demang, but is shot dead by a KNIL soldier. His body is left neglected. A Christmas night service is held at a church and the Priest preaches about the wealth and prosperity in Java, ignorant of the abuses and oppression in the colony. That sermon is attended by Max Havelaar, an ex-Assistant Resident of Manado and Lebak who resigned from this official charges and becomes unemployed in Amsterdam. Havelaar then meets Batavus Droogstoppel, his childhood friend who becomes a coffee broker and owns a coffee trading company, Last & Co. Havelaar offers Droogstoppel some help, with him writing a book about coffee trading from Havelaar's essays which was collected when he was Assistant Resident. Droogstoppel helps him forcefully and tries to read it. Then, Droogstoppel accidentally reads one of Havelaar's essay called "On the Coffee Auctions of the Dutch Trading Company" (Dutch title: Op de Koffi-veilingen der Nederlandsche Handel-Maatschappij).

In 1855, Christiaan Ernst Pierre (C.E.P.) Carolus a.k.a. Slotering, the Assistant Resident of Lebak, is poisoned to death by the Regent of Lebak, Raden Adipati Karta Nata Negara, after attending a banquet by the Regent. The reason is unclear, probably because Slotering has secret papers about the Regent's crimes and abuses in Lebak. But the doctor reports his cause of death cause due to illness, but the circumstances of Slotering's death seems to be already known and kept secret by the Resident of Bantam, C.P. Brest van Kempen a.k.a. Slijmering, who is involved in a conspiracy with the Regent. But nobody knows about this scandal, including the Governor-general, who is recommended by his aide to install Max Havelaar, the Assistant-Resident of Manado, as Slotering's successor. His aide is Havelaar's brother-in-law. The Governor-general agrees with his aide's recommendation. Havelaar is inaugurated at the Governor-general's palace in Buitenzorg and departs to Lebak the next day with his controller, Verbrugge. Havelaar is greeted warmly by the Regent and his Demangs. The next day, he is inaugurated by Slijmering in the Regency royal house. Everything goes well in the next few days until Djaksa (local police chief) tells him about Slotering's secret papers which he has saved. At first, Havelaar tries to ignore this and maintains his relationship with the Regent, Raden Adipati, as the highest local ruler in Lebak. Havelaar visits the Regency to make a speech to reassure its inhabitants. The Regent requests an advance of remaining additional tax payments from Assistant Residents. Havelaar grants his request even though there is no budget to that payment. Havelaar's wife, Tine a.k.a. "Pussy" (Dutch: Poesje) feels objected to Havelaar's decision, but Havelaar convinces Poesje that he will pay the Regent from his personal savings. Havelaar believes, if the Regent has no lack of money, the he will stop robbing his people. But Havelaar's hope is in vain and discovers the Regent's abuses. He finds some sawahs abandoned because all men in some villages are forcibly pressed to pull the grass and clean the Regent's house. He also finds some men building aloen-aloen without payment in preparation for welcoming the Regent's guests, the Regent of Bandoeng and Tjändjoer.

One day, Havelaar meets Säidjah and his father walking near the sawahs. Havelaar asks him where he was going, to which Säidjah's father answers that he is going to barter his heirloom kris for a new carabao. Havelaar then asks when his carabao died. Säidjah's father answers that his carabao is just dead. Havelaar thinks it is normal. But in the few weeks when he makes a visit to Säidjah's village, he finds the Demang of Parang Koedjang with his group collecting carabaos. Havelaar suspects the Demang is plundering the carabaos to be served in the banquet for the Regent's guests. The Demang tries to convince Havelaar that he buys carabaos from the villagers. Havelaar then interrogates Säidjah's father for a confrontation with the Demang, and wonders why he sold his carabao while he had to barter his kris to get a new carabao. Säidjah's father keeps silent because he is afraid of the Demang. Havelaar becomes upset after realizing that the people are more afraid of the Demang than himself as Assistant Resident. He immediately leaves the village to write a report about this situation to the Resident of Bantam. The Demang is angry with the villagers and takes away all the carabaos. He also burns Säidjah's and his father's clothes, leaving them cold at night. Säidjah's father falls ill and dies. An angry Säidjah comes before the Djaksa. They visit Havelaar's house together to report what happened. Säidjah brings his carabao's head as the evidence of looting by the Regent. Havelaar prepares to collect witnesses about the allegations of the Regent's act and attempts to bring them to court. But Säidjah refuses because he doubts the court and feels that every colonial official is the same as the Regent. Although Havelaar tries to convince Säidjah, Säidjah runs away to Lampong to join a rebellion.

Säidjah is killed in battle with the KNIL in Lampong. Havelaar's indictment is blocked by the Slijmering, who warns Havelaar that he would dismiss him as Assistant Resident if he keeps pursuing the case. Havelaar decides to pursue the indictment against the Regent by himself. But the court sides with the Regent and transfers Havelaar to become the Assistant Resident of Ngawi. Havelaar sees colonial justice as corrupt, and he resigns as Assistant Resident. He tries to discuss his case personally to the Governor-general, but in Buitenzorg, his brother-in-law, who serves as the Governor-general's aide, locks Havelaar in a room and tells him to be silent and go home to the Netherlands. Havelaar is completely enraged with the corruption of the Dutch colonial system, and shouts at a picture of King William III that he must take responsibility for this.

== Film version ==
A film adaptation of the novel was released in 1976, directed by Fons Rademakers as part of a Dutch-Indonesian partnership. The film Max Havelaar was not allowed to be shown in Indonesia until 1987.

== Editions ==
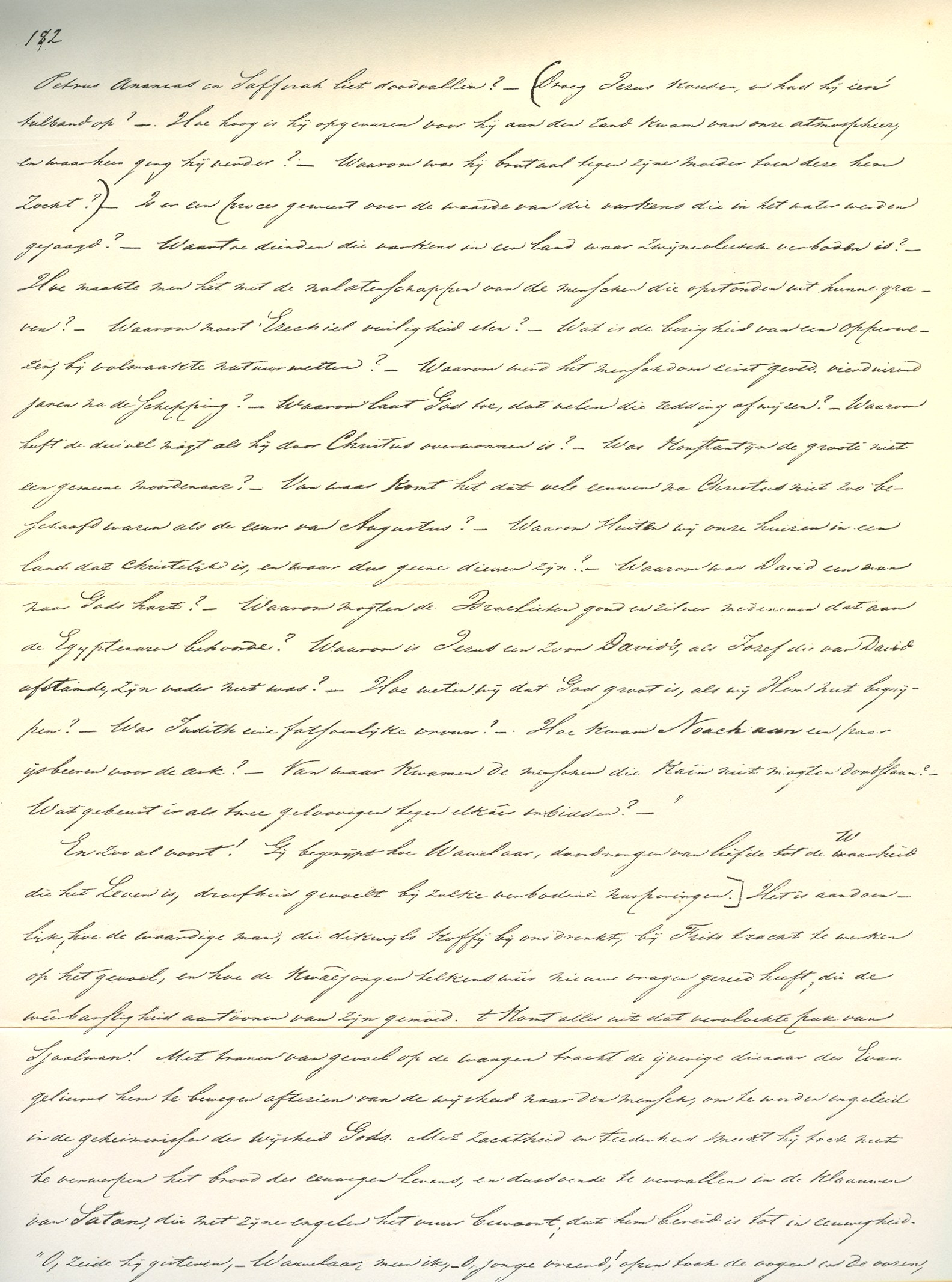
Page from the manuscript of 1860

The edition history of the book Max Havelaar began in the 1860s with a publication titled Max Havelaar, of De koffi-veilingen der Nederlandsche Handel-Maatschappy. During his life Dekker published six press-editions of Max Havelaar in the Netherlands, with three different publishers. In addition, Dekker made a significant contribution to the first translation of the book into English. After Dekker's death, the book was reprinted many times. The text and reprints that are found in bookstores today is sometimes based on the 4th edition from 1875, sometimes on the handwritten manuscript (also called the 0th edition), and increasingly on the fifth edition of 1881, the last to be revised by the author.

- 17 May 1860: the first edition: publishing house J. de Ruyter in Amsterdam. Three days earlier, on 14 May, the book had already been made available. This edition of 1300 copies was on large octavo printed by Munster and sons. There were two parts, of 212 and 185 pages. The books were sold for four guilders, a large amount for the time.
- 1860: second edition: J. de Ruyter, Amsterdam. The appearance of the book and typography did not differ from the first edition. The page layout and all lines were identical, so it seemed that it was printed from the same type used for the first edition. The book appeared again in two parts: the first part on 8 November 1860, the second part on 22 November. The exact size of the edition is unknown, but was probably between 700 and 1200 copies. The price for both parts was again four guilders.
- Double edition of the second edition: J. de Ruyter, Amsterdam The printing history of this book is complicated: In 1985 Annemarie Kets-Vree discovered a secret edition of this book. Appearance and typography of the book are identical and the title page still mentions 'Second Edition'. The book, however, was completely set anew by hand, and printed for the third time. The double printing could be identified with a printer's error in line 5 of the first chapter: "lieve lezers" (dear readers) instead of "lieve lezer" (Dear reader):

[....] dat gij, lieve lezers, zoo even ter hand hebt genomen, en dat [....]".

The reason for this covert edition is unknown, but it is speculated it was done by De Ruyter to avoid having to pay royalties to Dekker. The number of copies is unknown.

- February 1868: English translation: Max Havelaar or the Coffee auctions of the Dutch Trading Company by Multatuli. Translated from the original manuscript by Baron Alphonse Nahuÿs, Edinburgh, Edmonston & Douglas, Price: 12 shillings. From 12 March 1868 the book was on sale in Netherlands. This was the first edition made in cooperation with the author. Nahuys mentioned he used the original manuscript, but this manuscript was still with the editor of the first edition, De Ruyter.
- December 1871 - 20 January 1872: Third edition, Karel Hermanus Schadd, 296 pages, 5000 copies (small octavo 18,5 × 13 cm) price ƒ 2.90 + 100 copies of the luxe edition. price: ƒ 7.50 (large octavo 24 × 17 cm) In 1870 De Ruyter had sold his copyright for 2000 guilders. The text-source for this edition was the double-edition of the second-edition: The mistake in that edition remains: lieve lezers Both editions were printed in the same type, only the page size differed. There was a cheaper edition of the book available, but Douwes Dekker had no part in its sales and did not receive any income from it. He also could not correct or modify any of the text. In early 1873, Schadd sold his rights in the book for ƒ 2500 to the firm v/d Heuvell & Van Santen in Leiden.
- 4th edition: G.L. Funke, Amsterdam, 19 October 1875, 388 pages, small octavo, 5000 copies. This is the first edition done in cooperation with the author. In it many mistakes and alterations from the first edition could be corrected. Dekker added also numerous comments to the text to explain his intentions.
- 5th edition: Uitgevers Maatschappij Elsevier, Amsterdam, 1 November 1881, small octavo, ƒ 1,90 bound in paper ƒ 2,40 for copies in a hard cover. Second (and last) edition in cooperation with the author. Of this edition there have been four variants found, in the type at the press some changes were made, on both sides of the leaf. The papers that had already been printed earlier were not discarded, but were still used. Combining two different leaves makes four combinations possible. Copies of all four combinations have been identified.
- Multatuli, Max Havelaar of De koffiveilingen der Nederlandsche Handelmaatschappy. Critical edition, edited by Annemarie Kets-Vree. Monumenta Literaria Neerlandica VI, 1 and VI, 2. Assen/Maastricht, 1992.
- The manuscript remained untraceable for a long time. During the preparations for the celebration of 50 years Max Havelaar in 1910, a general appeal was made to make available, lend or donate documents, letters and other multatuliana to the association Het Multatuli Museum under construction. A descendant of J. de Ruyter, mr. C.H.E. Reelfs, found the original in his closet, among his stepfather's papers, and donated it to the Multatuli Museum. A copy thereof was published in 2007. The manuscript from 1860 is a newly transcribed version of an earlier draft, with all the corrections by Jacob van Lennep. Van Lennep first reduces the number of chapters in the manuscript to seventeen. The final number of chapters in print is slightly larger, namely twenty. Van Lennep also changed a large number of things during the correction of the type.

=== Modern translations ===
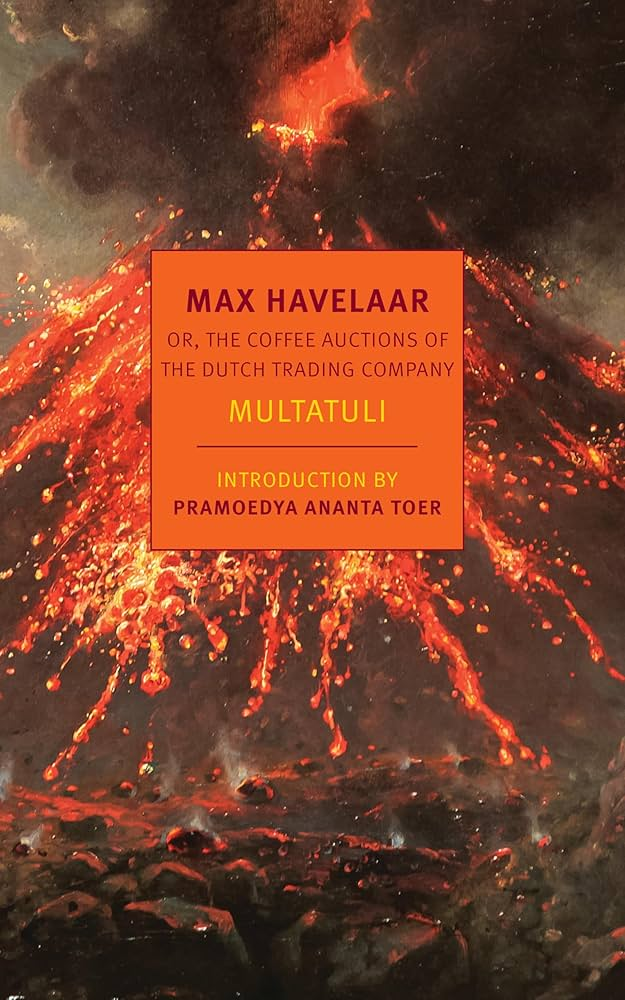
Cover of the NYRB Classics release

A new translation of Max Havelaar was published by NYRB Classics in May 2019.

== See also ==
- NRC's Best Dutch novels

== Sources ==
- Feenberg, Anne-Marie (1997), "Max Havelaar: an anti-imperialist novel", MLN, 112 (5): 817–835, doi:10.1353/mln.1997.0074, S2CID 162301318
- Kets, Annemarie (2020) [1998]. "Inleiding". Multatuli, Max Havelaar of de koffiveilingen der Nederlandsche Handelmaatschappy (11th ed.). Amsterdam: Prometheus. p. 15. ISBN 9789044647181.
- Ter Laan, K. (1995). Multatuli-encyclopedie. SDU, Den Haag. ISBN 90-12-08181-5.
- "Bezienswaardigheden in de historische binnenstad van Amsterdam". Amsterdam oude stad.
- Lubberhuizen, Bas (2007). Max Havelaar, of De koffij-veilingen der Nederlandsche Handelmaatschappij : het handschrift [Max Havelaar, or The coffee auctions of the Nederlandsche Handelmaatschappij : the manuscript]. Lubberhuizen. ISBN 978-90-5937-155-2.
- Van der Meulen, Dik (2002). Multatuli, leven en werk van Eduard Douwes Dekker. Sun, Amsterdam. ISBN 905875202X.
- Multatuli (1992) [1881]. A. Kets-Vree (ed.). Max Havelaar of de koffiveilingen der Nederlandsche Handelmaatschappy, editie Annemarie Kets. Vol. II (1st ed.). Van Gorcum, Assen/Maastricht.
- Multatuli (2020) [1881]. Kets, Annemarie (ed.). Max Havelaar of de koffiveilingen der Nederlandsche Handelmaatschappy (11th ed.). Amsterdam: Prometheus. ISBN 9789044647181.
- Toer, Pramoedya Ananta (18 April 1999). "The book that killed colonialism". The New York Times magazine. pp. 112–114. Archived from the original on 23 July 2010.

== Online text sources ==
- The full text of Max Havelaar at Wikisource, trans. by Alphonse Nahuijs, 1868
- Max Havelaar at Project Gutenberg (Dutch)
- Max Havelaar public domain audiobook at LibriVox
- Multatuli, Volledige werken. 25 vols. Van Oorschot, Amsterdam, 1951–1995.
- Multatuli, digital sources on dbnl.nl :digital text source "Work of Multatuli" at dbn.nl
- Multatuli, Max Havelaar of de koffiveilingen der Nederlandsche Handelmaatschappy. Historisch-kritische uitgave, by A. Kets-Vree. 2 vols, Van Gorcum, Assen / Maastricht, 1992. ISBN 90 232 2690 9 dbnl.nl digital text source of "Historical-critical edition"
- A.L. Sötemann, De structuur van Max Havelaar. 2 delen. Wolters Noordhoff, Groningen, 1966. dbnl.nl digital text source of "The structure of Max Havelaar"
- E.M. Beekman, Paradijzen van weleer. Koloniale literatuur uit Nederlands–Indië 1600-1950. Prometheus, Amsterdam, 1998. ISBN 90 5333 593 5, dbnl.nl digital text source of "Paradises of former times"
