= Brenda Osnaya =

Mexican paratriathlete

Personal information
- Full name: Brenda Osnaya Álvarez
- Born: 1 August 1993 (age 33)
- Spouse: Jessie González

Sport
- Country: Mexico
- Sport: Paratriathlon

Brenda Osnaya Álvarez (born 1 August 1993) is a Mexican paratriathlete. She is the first Mexican woman to compete in paratriathlon at the Paralympic Games. She has won multiple awards and has received global recognition throughout her career.

== Personal life ==
She was disqualified from the Paris 2024 Games because of accumulated penalties. She proposed to her coach/partner after a rough day at the Paris Paralympics (2024). She raised a sign that read "Te quieres casar conmigo?”-Do you want to marry me? Jessie González, the coach, answered, "Yes." This had led to a successful relationship. This proposal gained significant popularity in the media.

== Career ==
She started her career with inline skating. An unfortunate spinal cord injury via a car accident at the age of 17 (2010) transformed her life. Alvarez found a new goal through rehabilitation, where she was encouraged to swim. This started her passion, which led to her participating in paratriathlon. She debuted at the Tokyo 2020 Games.

She has won a bronze medal at the 2022 Americas Triathlon Cup, gold in the 100-meter T34 at the 2022 Grand Prix, silver at the 2024 Devonport World Series, and gold at the 2023 Para-triathlon World Cup. Osnaya placed first in the women's wheelchair category of the XLII Telcel Marathon in Mexico City (2025–08–031).

She placed sixth in the 2024 World Triathlon Para Series Montreal (2024-06-29), seventh in the 2024 World Triathlon Para Championships Torremolinos-Andalucía (2024-10-18), fifth in the 2025 World Triathlon Para Series Montreal (2025-07-19), and fifth in the 2025 World Triathlon Para Championships Wollongong (2025-10-18). She was disqualified from the Paris 2024 Paralympic Games (2024-09-02). She has 37 starts, 16 podiums, and 5 wins in Triathlon. These statistics are for the Women's Para Triathlon Wheelchair (PTWC). She ranks eighth in the Women's Para Triathlon Wheelchair (PTWC) with a total of 1185.43 points.

Other than PTWC Women, she has also participated in Women's PT1, Women's PT1 Open, PTWC Women's Open and Open Para Triathlon Mixed Relay.
