= Poenale sanctie =

Legal penalty in Surinam and Dutch East Indies

The poenale sanctie (penal sanction) was a legal penalty from 1880 to 1948 in both Suriname and the Dutch East Indies.

== Dutch East Indies ==
The poenale sanctie was a part of the Koelie Ordonnantie ('Coolie Ordinance') of 1880 and stipulated that a plantation-owner could punish his coolies in any manner he saw fit, including fines. This made the plantation-owner both policeman and judge. The reasons for punishing a coolie could be many, including laziness, insolence or attempting to flee the plantation. Because of the poenale sanctie whipping became commonplace on the plantations of the Dutch East Indies. The overseers thought that without these whippings, the 'dumb and lazy' coolies would never do their jobs.

Around 1900 criticism of the system arose, but the sanction was only finally abolished in 1931.

== Suriname ==
After the abolition of slavery in Suriname in 1863, indentured servants were recruited primarily in the Dutch East Indies and in British India. These servants were subject to poenale sanctie because of their contracts. This meant that in case of breach of contract, the servant would not be subjected to civil law, but to criminal law. A plantation-owner could thus subject his servants to harsh punishments, as long as they were under contract. By ordinance of 8 September 1947, the poenale sanctie was officially abolished in Suriname on 1 January 1948.

== See also ==
- penalty (disambiguation)
- History of Suriname
- Dutch colonisation of the Guianas
- Coolie
