= Dutch East Indies =

Dutch colony in Indonesia (1800–1949)

Coordinates: 5°S 120°E

Dutch East Indies Nederlands(ch)-Indië (Dutch) Hindia Belanda (Indonesian)
- 1800–1949
- Flag Coat of arms (1907–1949)
- Motto: Je maintiendrai (French) ("I will uphold")
- Anthem: Wien Neêrlands Bloed (Dutch) (1815–1932) (English: "Those in Whom Dutch Blood") Wilhelmus (Dutch) (1932–1949)
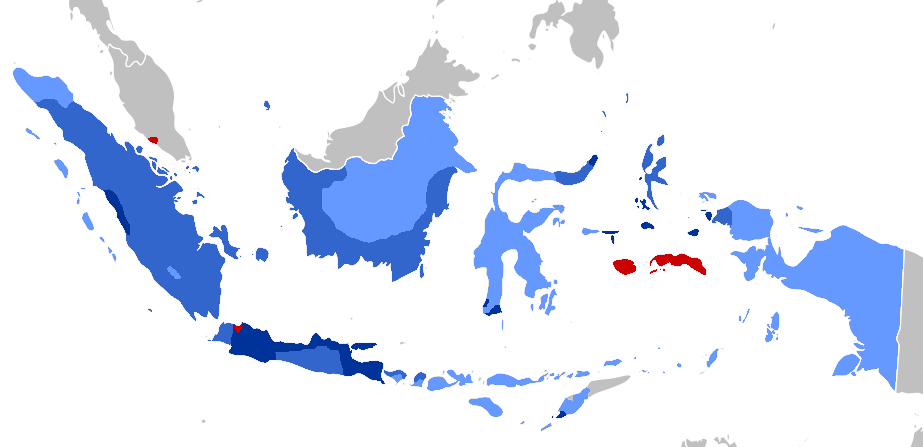
- Map of Dutch expansion in the Indonesian Archipelago: 1600s 1700s 1800s 1900–1942
- Status: Colony of the Dutch Empire: in exile (1942–1945)
- Capital: Batavia (now Jakarta)
- Largest city: Soerabaja
- Common languages: Dutch (official); Malay (lingua franca); Indigenous languages Chinese
- Religion: Islam; Christianity; Hinduism; Buddhism; Confucianism; Taoism; Chinese folk religion Animism/Traditional religion
- Demonym: Dutch East Indian
- Government: Unitary dependent territory under direct and indirect rule
- Grand Pensionary
  - 1800 (first): Augustijn Gerhard Besier
  - 1806 (last): Carel de Vos van Steenwijk
- Monarch
  - 1816–1840 (first): William I
  - 1890–1948 (last): Wilhelmina
- Governor-General
  - 1800–1801 (first): Pieter Gerardus van Overstraten
  - 1936-1942 (last): Alidius Tjarda van Starkenborgh Stachouwer
- Legislature: Volksraad (1918–1942)
- History
  - Dutch East India Company: 1603–1799
  - Direct Dutch control: 31 December 1799
  - French and British interregnum: 1806–1816
  - Anglo-Dutch Treaty: 13 August 1814
  - Treaty of London: 17 March 1824
  - Aceh War: 1873–1904
  - Second Dutch intervention in Bali: April 1908
  - Japanese occupation: 1942–1945
  - Proclamation of Indonesian Independence: 17 August 1945
  - Indonesian National Revolution: 1945–1949
  - Dutch–Indonesian Round Table Conference: 27 December 1949

Area
  - Total: 1,919,440 km^{2} (741,100 sq mi)

Population
  - 1930: 60,727,233
- Currency: Guilder
Preceded by
Dutch East India Company
British Bencoolen
Aceh Sultanate
Riau-Lingga Sultanate
Bali Kingdom
Lanfang Republic
Pagaruyung Kingdom
Sultanate of Bulungan
Sultanate of Sulu
Banjar Sultanate
Sultanate of Palembang
Banten Sultanate
Mataram Sultanate
Japanese occupation of the Dutch East Indies
Japanese occupation of New Guinea
Succeeded by
Straits Settlements
Japanese occupation of the Dutch East Indies
Japanese occupation of New Guinea
United States of Indonesia
Dutch New Guinea
- Today part of: Indonesia; Malaysia (Note: The port of Malacca was part of the Dutch East Indies from 1818–1825.)

The Dutch East Indies (Note: Also Netherlands East Indies Dutch: Nederlands(ch)-Indië, Indonesian: Hindia Belanda, or Insulind, a 'garland of Emeralds') was a colony of the Dutch Empire, established in 1800 when the Batavian Republic took control of the Dutch East India Company. In 1824, Dutch Malacca was ceded to Britain, and is now part of modern Malaysia, with most of the rest becoming Indonesia in August 1945. During the 19th century, Dutch forces fought a series of wars against indigenous states which greatly expanded the Dutch East Indies. Dutch rule reached its greatest territorial extent in the early 20th century with the occupation of Western New Guinea.

The colony contributed to Dutch global prominence in spice and cash crop trade in the 19th century, and coal and oil exploration in the 20th century. The colonial social order was rigidly racial with the Dutch elite living separately from but linked to their native subjects. The term Indonesia was used for the geographical location after 1880. In the early 20th century, local intellectuals conceived Indonesia as a nation state, setting the stage for an independence movement.

Japan's World War II occupation dismantled much of the Dutch colonial state and economy. Following the Japanese surrender on 15 August 1945, Indonesian nationalist leaders Sukarno and Hatta declared independence, instigating the Indonesian National Revolution. The Dutch, aiming to re-establish control of the archipelago, responded by deploying roughly 220,000 troops, who fought a counterinsurgency campaign against Indonesian nationalists. The United States threatened to terminate financial aid for the Netherlands under the Marshall Plan if they did not agree to transfer sovereignty to Indonesia, leading to Dutch recognition of Indonesian sovereignty at the 1949 Dutch–Indonesian Round Table Conference. During the revolution and after Indonesian independence, almost all Dutch citizens repatriated to the Netherlands.

In 1962, the Dutch turned over their last possession in Southeast Asia, Dutch New Guinea (Western New Guinea), to Indonesia under the provisions of the New York Agreement. At that point, the entirety of the colony ceased to exist.

== Etymology ==
The word Indies comes from Latin: Indus (Names for India). The original name Dutch Indies (Dutch: Nederlandsch-Indië) was translated by the English as the Dutch East Indies, to keep it distinct from the Dutch West Indies. The name Dutch Indies is recorded in the Dutch East India Company's documents of the early 1620s.

Scholars writing in English use the terms Indië, Indies, the Dutch East Indies, the Netherlands Indies, and colonial Indonesia interchangeably.

== History ==
=== Before the Dutch ===
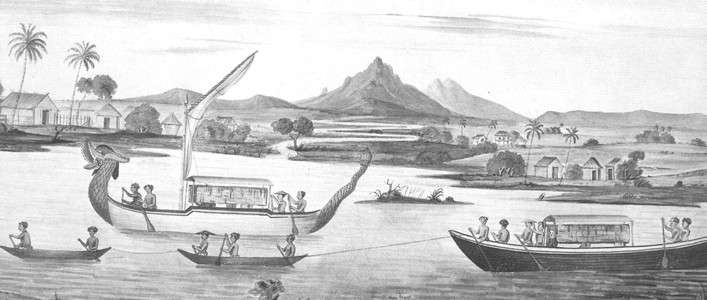
A sketch of life in the sultanate in the Indonesian region before the arrival of Europeans depicts a boat on the Bengawan Solo River.

At the time when Europeans arrived, the Indonesian archipelago supported various states, including commercially oriented coastal trading states and inland agrarian states (the most important were Srivijaya and Majapahit). Since centuries BCE the islands were part of migratory and commercial exchange within Southeast Asia, India, Arabian peninsula and east-Africa. From classical antiquity onwards the archipelago was also a major part of the global spice trade. For centuries Hindu-Buddhist civilizations were dominant; however, increasing trade links instigated the spread of Islam. By the 16th century, a large part of the archipelago was ruled under Islamic kingdoms, except Bali that retained a Hindu majority. Sultanates, city states, local kingdoms and tribes were all connected through trade, creating a mixed Hindu-Buddhist-Islamic culture, and Malay as a lingua franca throughout the region. The islands were known to the Europeans and were sporadically visited by expeditions such as that of Italians Marco Polo in 1292 and Odoric of Pordenone in 1321. The first Europeans to establish themselves in Indonesia were the Portuguese in 1512 who established a network of trading posts and fortresses throughout the region, including at the Spice Islands of the Maluku Islands. In 1580, Portugal formed a union with Spain, and therewith entered the war with the Dutch Republic.

=== Dutch East Indies Company rule ===
Expansion of the Dutch East Indies in the Indonesian Archipelago

Following disruption of Dutch access to spices, the first Dutch expedition set sail to reach the East Indies in 1595 to access spices directly from Asia. After many skirmishes and hardships, only one third of the original crew made it back to Holland and other Dutch expeditions soon followed. Recognising the potential of the East Indies trade, the Dutch government amalgamated the competing companies into the United East India Company (Vereenigde Oost-Indische Compagnie or VOC).

In March 1602, the VOC was granted a charter to wage war, build fortresses, and make treaties across Asia. A capital was established in Batavia (now Jakarta), which became the centre of the VOC's Asian trading network. To their original monopolies on nutmeg, peppers, cloves and cinnamon, the company and later colonial administrations introduced non-indigenous cash crops like coffee, tea, cacao, tobacco, rubber, sugar and opium, and safeguarded their commercial interests by taking over surrounding territory. Smuggling, the ongoing expense of war, corruption, and mismanagement led to bankruptcy by the end of the 18th century. The company was formally dissolved in 1800 and its colonial possessions in the Indonesian archipelago (including much of Java, parts of Sumatra, much of Maluku, and the hinterlands of ports such as Makasar, Manado and Kupang) were nationalized under the Dutch Republic as the Dutch East Indies.

=== Slavery ===
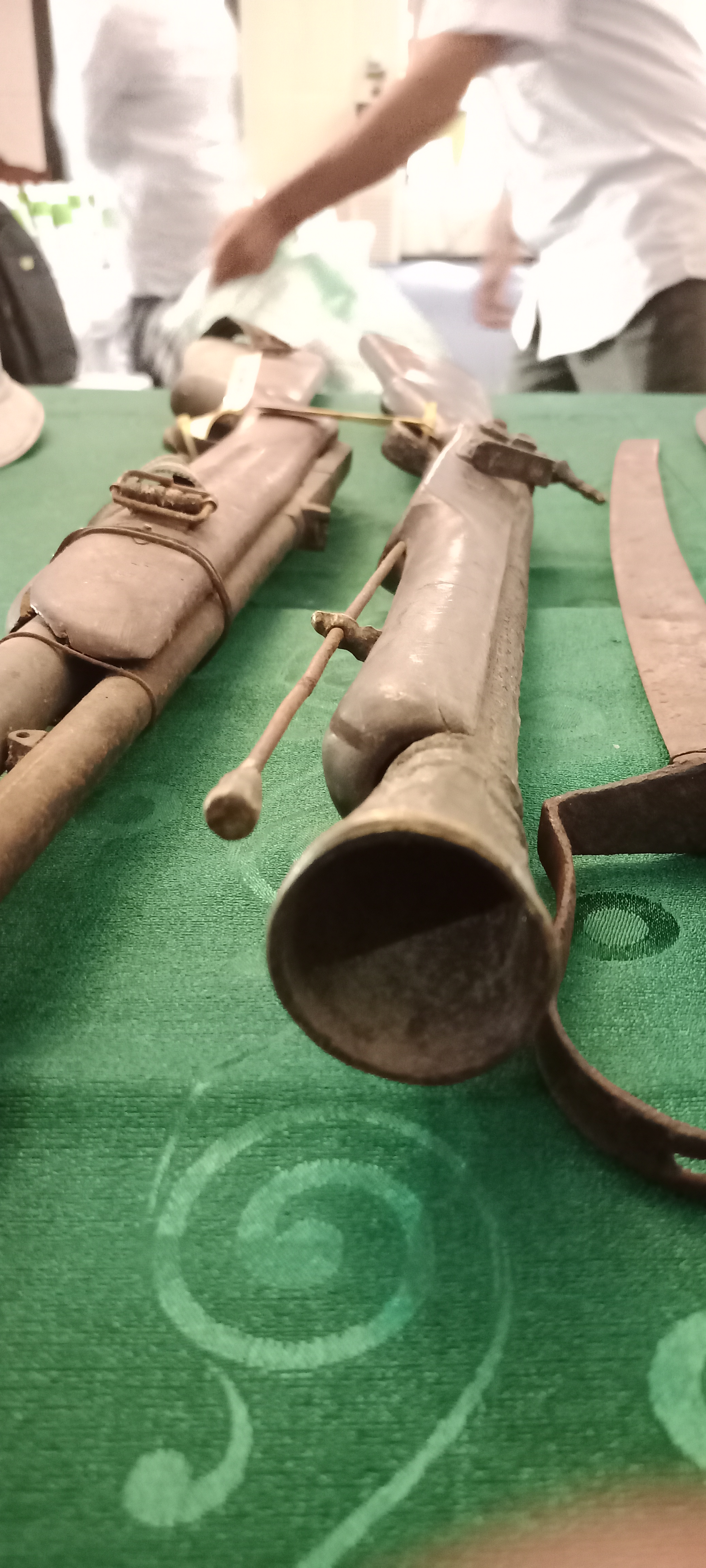
The Dutch used their early historical weapons to conquer kingdoms in the archipelago at that time.

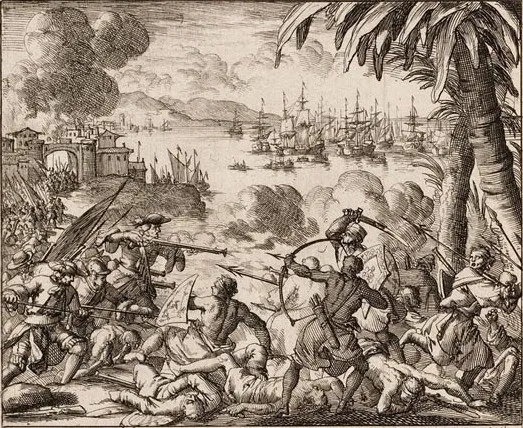
A painting of VOC troops conquering the Banten Sultanate

When the VOC arrived in the Indonesian archipelago, they started to use and expand upon the then-existing indigenous system of slavery. In certain places, slaves were used on plantations such as on the Maluku islands, namely the Banda islands where most of the local population had been deported or exterminated by the VOC to be replaced with slaves. Dutch slaves worked in agriculture, manufacturing, and services, but most were used as domestic servants including housemaids and houseboys, cooks, seamstresses, musicians, and concubines.

Slaves could be acquired through trade at indigenous slave markets or captured on raids. In certain cases, the VOC stirred up ethnic tensions between rivalling populations in the hope they could cheaply buy war captives at slave markets after the conflict. Slaves were transported from islands in Indonesia itself, or from other countries such as India and China. Estimates of the scale of the slave trade in the Dutch East Indies are scant, but it is suggested that around 1 million slaves were active during its peak in the 17th and 18th century.

Punishments for slaves could be extremely harsh— for instance, runaway slaves and their accomplices could be subject to whipping, chain gangs, or death. Other punishments included the cutting of hands, ears, breasts and noses, forms of scaphism, being burned alive and the breaking wheel. In theory, slave masters did not have free rein to punish their own slaves as they wished. Punishments of slaves had to be decided in court, and certain punishments could only be applied when the slave was found guilty in an official court case. In reality, however, abuse of slaves by their masters was rampant and often went unpunished. Beatings and whippings were a commonplace punishment for disobedient slaves. Rape of female slaves by their masters was a common occurrence as well, as these women and girls were obliged to provide sexual services for their masters. Refusing to do so could result in severe physical punishment. Slavery and its excesses did not end with the bankruptcy of the VOC in 1798, but continued under Dutch state rule. Due to growing international criticism slavery was eventually abolished in the Dutch East Indies in 1860. In reality, this was mostly limited to the slaves present on Java and Madura, whose masters were financially compensated for the loss of their workforce. However, on many other islands where slave masters were more often indigenous rulers, little changed. The main reason for this was financial, as the Dutch state at that time did not want to spend the money necessary to free the slaves on the more distant islands. Another reason was to appease local rulers and to prevent political turmoil. Due to the lax policy of the Dutch state slavery persisted in parts of the Dutch East Indies well into the 20th century.

=== Dutch conquests ===
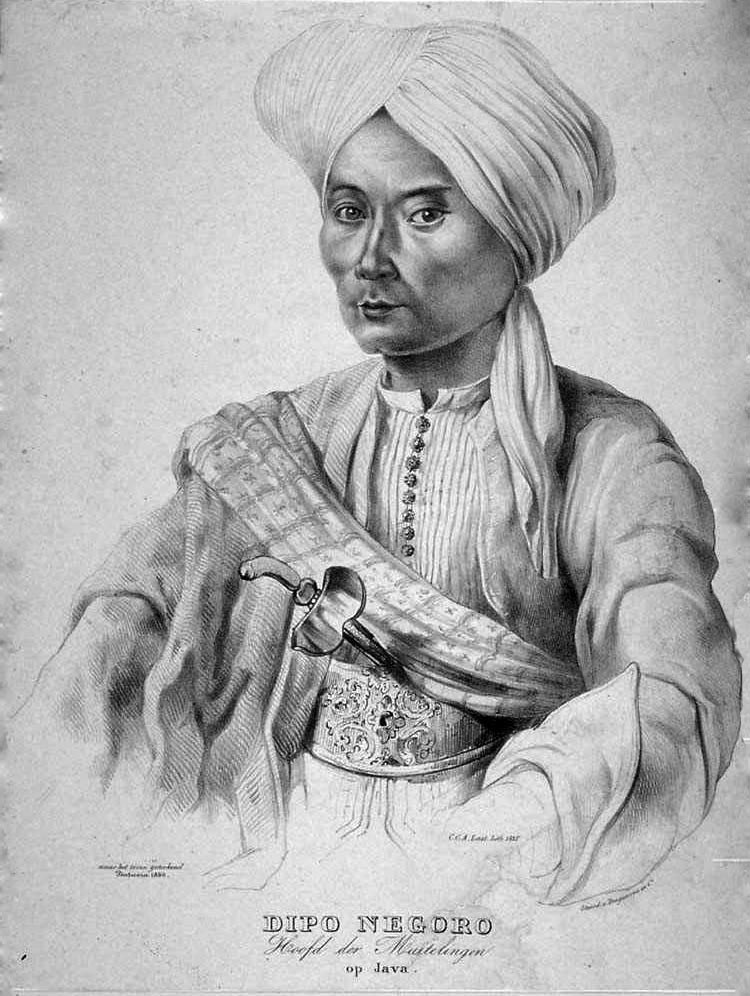
Diponegoro, who fought the Java War against the Dutch

From the arrival of the first Dutch ships in the late 16th century, to the declaration of independence in 1945, Dutch control over the Indonesian archipelago was always tenuous. Although Java was dominated by the Dutch, many areas remained independent throughout much of this time, including Aceh, Bali, Lombok and Borneo. There were numerous wars and disturbances across the archipelago as various indigenous groups resisted efforts to establish Dutch hegemony, which weakened Dutch control and tied up its military forces. Piracy remained a problem until the mid-19th century. Finally, in the early 20th century, imperial dominance was extended across what was to become the territory of modern-day Indonesia.

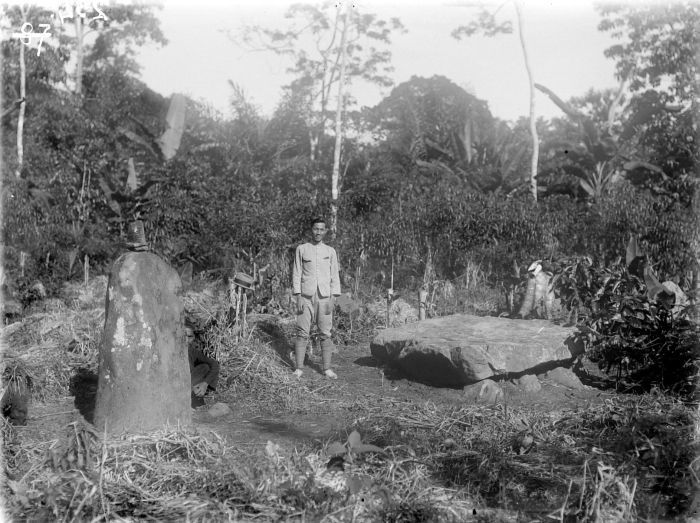
Collectie Stichting Nationaal Museum van Wereldculturen Figure Megalith found year 1931 Location of the Kepaksian Pernong Sekala Brak in Hanibung Batu Brak, independent Dutch control securing British settlements in Sumatra.

In 1806, with the Netherlands under Imperial French domination, Emperor Napoleon I appointed his brother Louis Bonaparte to the Dutch throne, which led to the 1808 appointment of Marshal Herman Willem Daendels as Governor-General of the Dutch East Indies. In 1811 Daendels was replaced by Governor-General Jan Willem Janssens, but shortly after his arrival, British forces occupied several Dutch East Indies ports including the Maluku Islands in 1810 and Java in 1811, leading to Sir Thomas Stamford Raffles becoming Lieutenant Governor. Following Napoleon's defeat at the 1815 Battle of Waterloo and the Congress of Vienna, independent Dutch control was restored in 1816 on the basis of the Anglo-Dutch Treaty of 1814. The Commissioners-General of the Dutch East Indies reformed the public finances of the colony and drew up a new Regeringsreglement that would define the government of the colony for a century. Under the Anglo-Dutch Treaty of 1824 the Dutch received the Kepaksian Pernong Sekala Brak and all British settlements in Sumatra while Britain received Dutch possessions in the Malay Peninsula and India as well as acknowledgement of British control over Singapore. The resulting borders between former British and Dutch possessions remain today between modern Malaysia and Indonesia.

Since the establishment of the VOC in the 17th century, the expansion of Dutch territory had been a business matter. Graaf van den Bosch's governor-generalship (1830–1835) confirmed profitability as the foundation of official policy, restricting its attention to Java, Sumatra and Bangka. However, from about 1840, Dutch national expansionism saw them wage a series of wars to enlarge and consolidate their possessions in the outer islands. Motivations included the protection of areas already held, the intervention of Dutch officials ambitious for glory or promotion, and the aim to establish Dutch claims throughout the archipelago to prevent intervention from other Western powers during the European push for colonial possessions. As exploitation of Indonesian resources expanded off Java, most of the outer islands came under direct Dutch government control or influence.

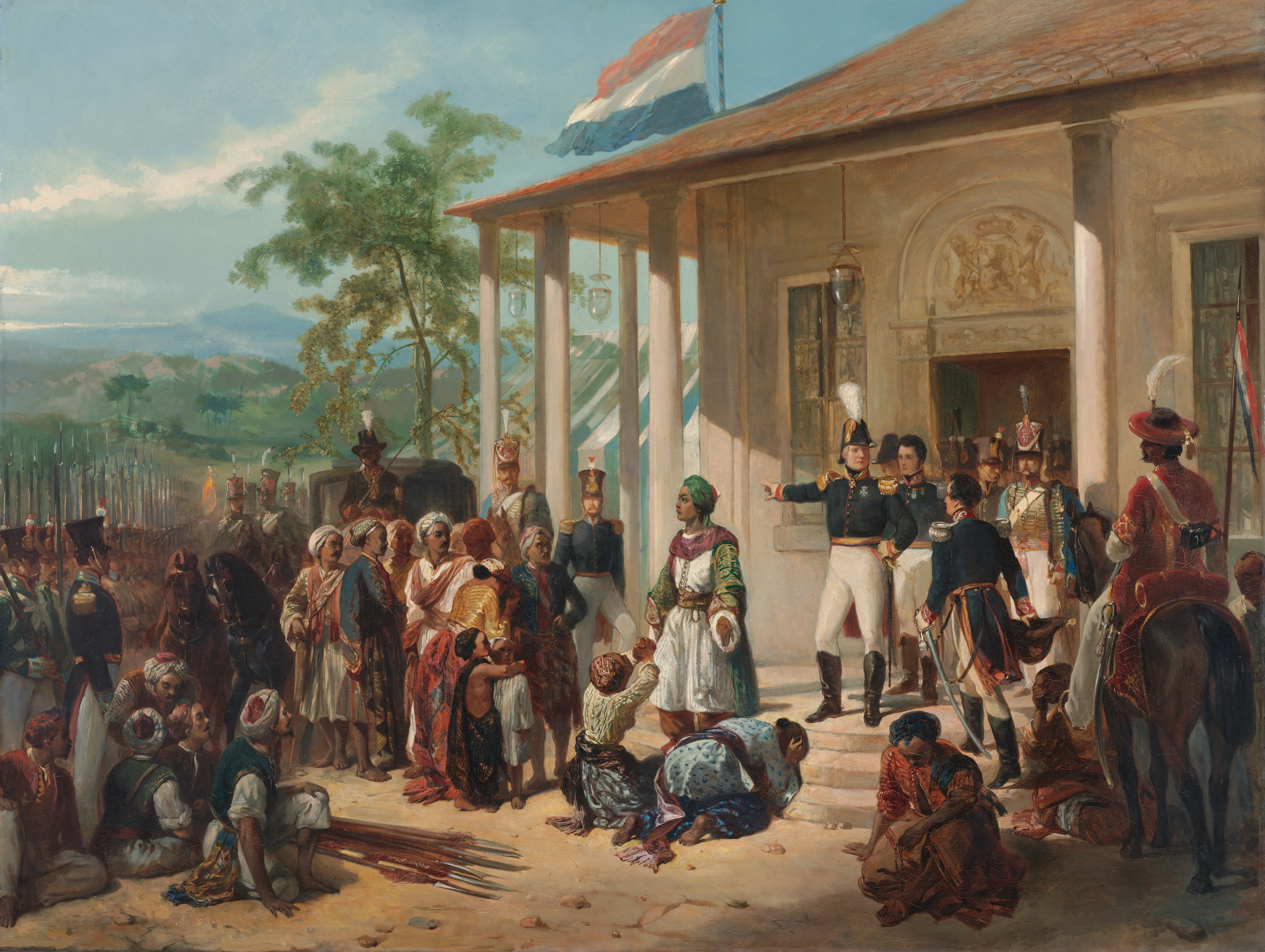
The Submission of Prince Dipo Negoro to General De Kock, by Nicolaas Pieneman

The Dutch subjugated the Minangkabau of Sumatra in the Padri War (1821–38) and the Java War (1825–30) ended significant Javanese resistance. The Banjarmasin War (1859–1863) in southeast Kalimantan resulted in the defeat of the Sultan. After failed expeditions to conquer Bali in 1846 and 1848, an 1849 intervention brought northern Bali under Dutch control. The most prolonged military expedition was the Aceh War in which a Dutch invasion in 1873 was met with indigenous guerrilla resistance and ended with an Acehnese surrender in 1912. Disturbances continued to break out on both Java and Sumatra during the remainder of the 19th century. This included the Banten Peasant's Revolt in the aftermath of the tremendous eruption of Krakatoa in 1883. However, the island of Lombok came under Dutch control in 1894, and Batak resistance in northern Sumatra was quashed in 1895. Towards the end of the 19th century, the balance of military power shifted towards the industrialising Dutch and against pre-industrial independent indigenous Indonesian polities as the technology gap widened. Military leaders and Dutch politicians believed they had a moral duty to free the native Indonesian peoples from indigenous rulers who were considered oppressive, backward, or disrespectful of international law.

Although Indonesian rebellions broke out, direct colonial rule was extended throughout the rest of the archipelago from 1901 to 1910 and control taken from the remaining independent local rulers. Southwestern Sulawesi was occupied in 1905–06, the island of Bali was subjugated with military conquests in 1906 and 1908, as were the remaining independent kingdoms in Maluku, Sumatra, Kalimantan and Nusa Tenggara. Other rulers including the Sultans of Tidore in Maluku, Pontianak (Kalimantan) and Palembang in Sumatra, requested Dutch protection from independent neighbours thereby avoiding Dutch military conquest and were able to negotiate better conditions under colonial rule. The Bird's Head Peninsula (Western New Guinea), was brought under Dutch administration in 1920. This final territorial range would form the territory of the Republic of Indonesia. The colonial wars in the Dutch East Indies exacted a heavy toll on the Indonesian population, with estimates ranging from hundreds of thousands to 4 million deaths including both direct war casualties and indirect victims of war due to famine and disease.

=== Cultivation System and Coolie Ordinances ===
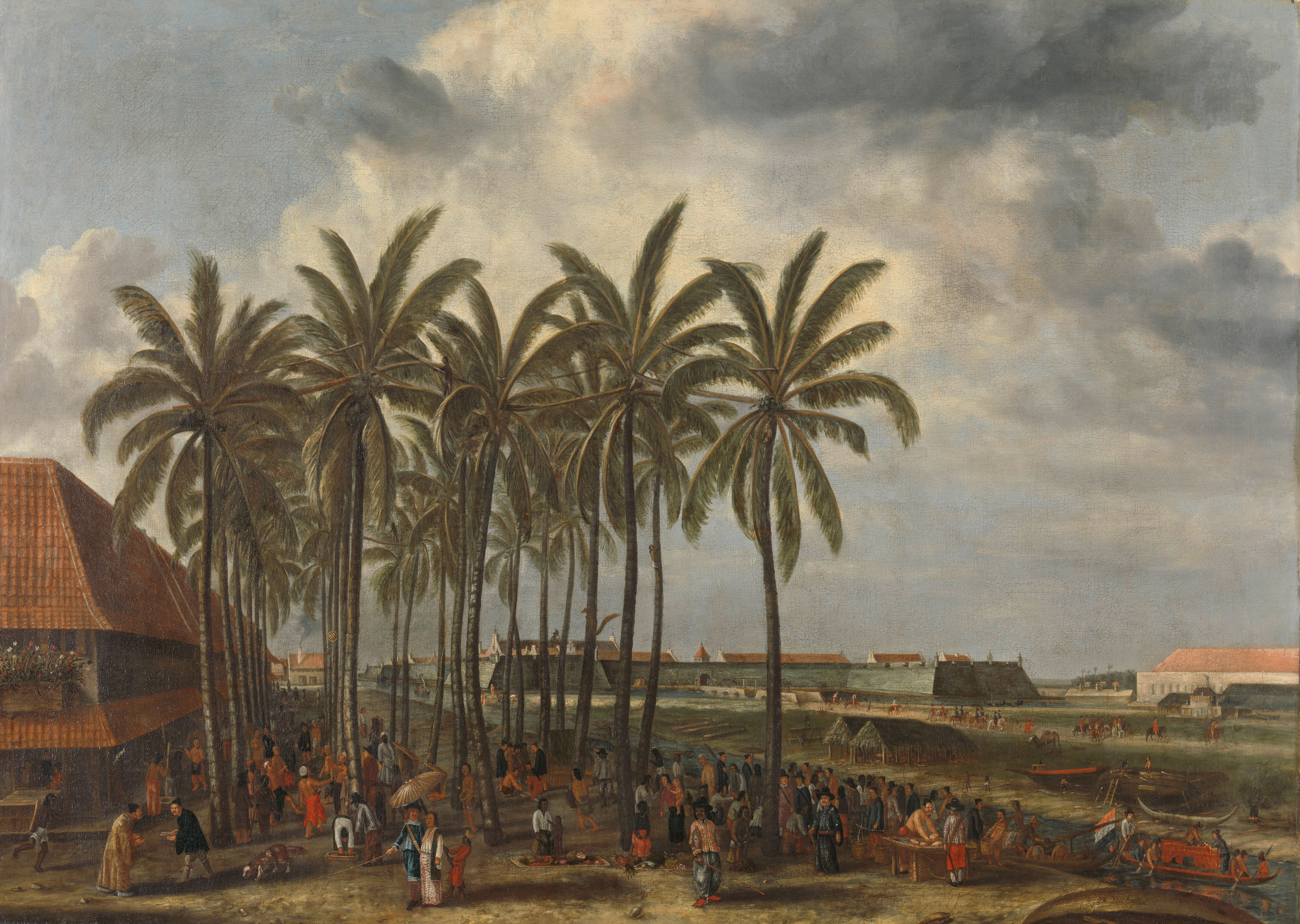
Painting of the city of Batavia during the Dutch colonial period, which was previously Sunda Kelapa, owned by the Banten Sultanate.

Due to the high monetary costs of several Dutch conquests in the 19th century, the Cultivation System ("Cultuurstelsel") was implemented in 1830. Under this system it was stipulated that Indonesian farmers had to use 20% of their farmland for the cultivation of cash crops for export such as indigo, coffee and sugar. Through this system considerable profits were made; the net profit for the Dutch treasury is estimated at 4% of the Dutch GDP at the time and around 50% of total state revenue.

The system proved disastrous for the local population; at its height, over 1 million farmers worked under the Cultuurstelsel and the extreme incentive for profit resulted in widespread abuses. Farmers were often forced to either use more than 20% of their farmland, or the most fertile land, for cultivation of cash crops. The system led to an increase in famine and disease among Javanese peasants in the 1840s. According to one estimate, the mortality rates increased by as much as 30% during this period. Due to widespread criticism of the system, it was abolished in 1870. According to one study, the mortality rate in Java would have been 10–20% higher by the late 1870s if the Cultivation system had not been abolished. The introduction of trucks, railways, telegraph systems, and more coordinated distribution systems all contributed to famine elimination in Java which had historically been common. Java experienced rapid population growth during the 19th century and there were no significant famines in Java after the 1840s.

Another source of profit were the so-called coolies, a name for low-wage indentured labourers. After the abolition of the Cultivation System in 1870, the economy shifted to private companies such as the Deli Company, which was founded on Sumatra in 1869. Large-scale plantations were built to grow cash crops and Javanese, Chinese, Malay, Batak and Indian people were shipped to the plantations in Sumatra and Java to perform harsh labour. It is estimated that over 500,000 coolies were transported to Sumatra during the late 19th and early 20th century. The precise death rate among coolie labourers is hard to estimate due to scarce or unreliable records but has been estimated to be as high as 25% in certain places, with a possible death toll of many tens of thousands.

While coolies were often paid labourers who worked out of free will, in practice their circumstances often involved forced labour and more closely resembled slavery. They were often misled when signing work contracts or even forced to sign contracts. Others were kidnapped or forced to work due to debts or were criminals sentenced to forced labour by the colonial justice system. The Coolie Ordinances ("Poenale sanctie") of 1880, which allowed the plantation owners to serve as judge, jury and executioner resulted in widespread atrocities. It included a penal sanction which allowed owners to physically punish their coolies as they saw fit. Punishments that were used against coolies included whippings or beatings, after which the open wounds were rubbed with salt. Other punishments used were electrocution, crucifixion and suspending coolies by their toes or thumbs until they broke. Medical care for the coolies was scarce and often aimed at healing punished coolies so they could return to work or be tortured more extensively. Rape of adult female coolies as well as their children was also common.

The coolie system was heavily criticized, especially after 1900 with the rise of the so-called "Ethical Politics". A critical pamphlet named "De miljoenen uit Deli" was published by J. van den Brand. The document described abuses committed against coolies including the torture and sexual abuse of a 15-year-old female coolie who had rejected sexual advances of a Dutch plantation overseer. The penal sanction was eventually abolished in 1931 and the Coolie Ordinances ended in the early 1940s.

=== Njai System ===
During earlier stages of colonization female indigenous sex slaves were bought by Dutch colonials, but this practice was cut short after 1860 with the abolition of slavery. In the late 19th century, increasing numbers of Dutch immigrants arrived in colonial Indonesia, leading to a shortage of available women, as most immigrants were men. The Dutch then bought the "Njai", who were indigenous women who officially served as maids but were often also used as concubines. While officially contract workers, these women enjoyed few rights. They could be bought and sold together with the house they worked in as so-called "Indigenous Furniture" (Inlands Meubel). Njai were also not allowed custody of the children they had with their Dutch masters, and when they were fired, their children would be taken away.

By the 1910s the number of Njai had decreased, although prostitution had become more prevalent. The practice had not died out, however, by the time the Empire of Japan invaded and occupied the Indies. During the occupation, the Njai and their mixed-race children were forcefully separated from European men, who were put into internment camps. After Sukarno proclaimed an independent Indonesia, the Njai were forced to choose between going with their partners to Europe, or staying in Indonesia.

=== World War II and independence ===
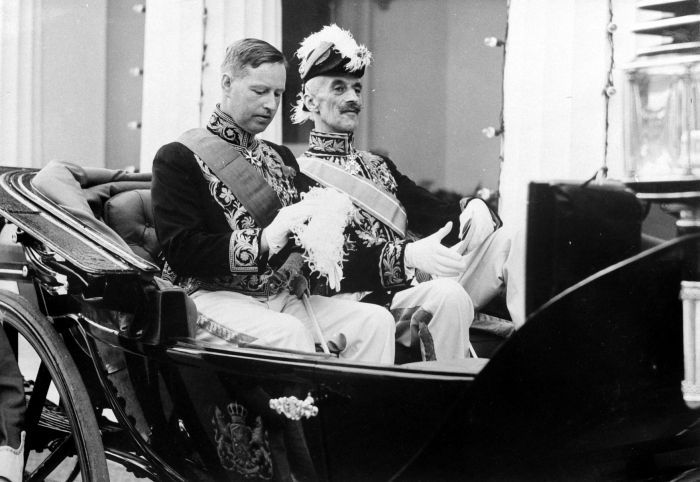
Tjarda van Starkenborgh Stachouwer and B. C. de Jonge, the last and penultimate governor-general of the Dutch East Indies, before the Japanese invasion

The Netherlands capitulated their European territory to Germany on May 14, 1940. The royal family fled to exile in Britain. Germany and Japan were Axis allies. On 27 September 1940, Germany, Hungary, Italy and Japan signed a treaty outlining "spheres of influence". The Dutch East Indies fell into Japan's sphere.

Dutch East Indies during the Japanese occupation when Japanese Prime Minister Hideki Tojo visited the island of Java.

The Netherlands, Britain and the United States tried to defend the colony from the Japanese forces as they moved south in late 1941 in search of Dutch oil. On 10 January 1942, during the Dutch East Indies Campaign, Japanese forces invaded the Dutch East Indies as part of the Pacific War. The rubber plantations and oil fields of the Dutch East Indies were considered crucial for the Japanese war effort. Allied forces were quickly overwhelmed by the Japanese and on 8 March 1942 the Royal Dutch East Indies Army surrendered in Java.

Fuelled by the Japanese Light of Asia war propaganda and the Indonesian National Awakening, a vast majority of the indigenous Dutch East Indies population first welcomed the Japanese as liberators from the colonial Dutch empire, but this sentiment quickly changed as the occupation turned out to be far more oppressive and ruinous than the Dutch colonial government. The Japanese occupation during World War II brought about the fall of the colonial state in Indonesia, as the Japanese removed as much of the Dutch government structure as they could, replacing it with their own regime. Although the top positions were held by the Japanese, the internment of all Dutch citizens meant that Indonesians filled many leadership and administrative positions. In contrast to Dutch repression of Indonesian nationalism, the Japanese allowed indigenous leaders to forge links among the masses, and they trained and armed the younger generations.

According to a UN report, four million people died in Indonesia as a result of the Japanese occupation.

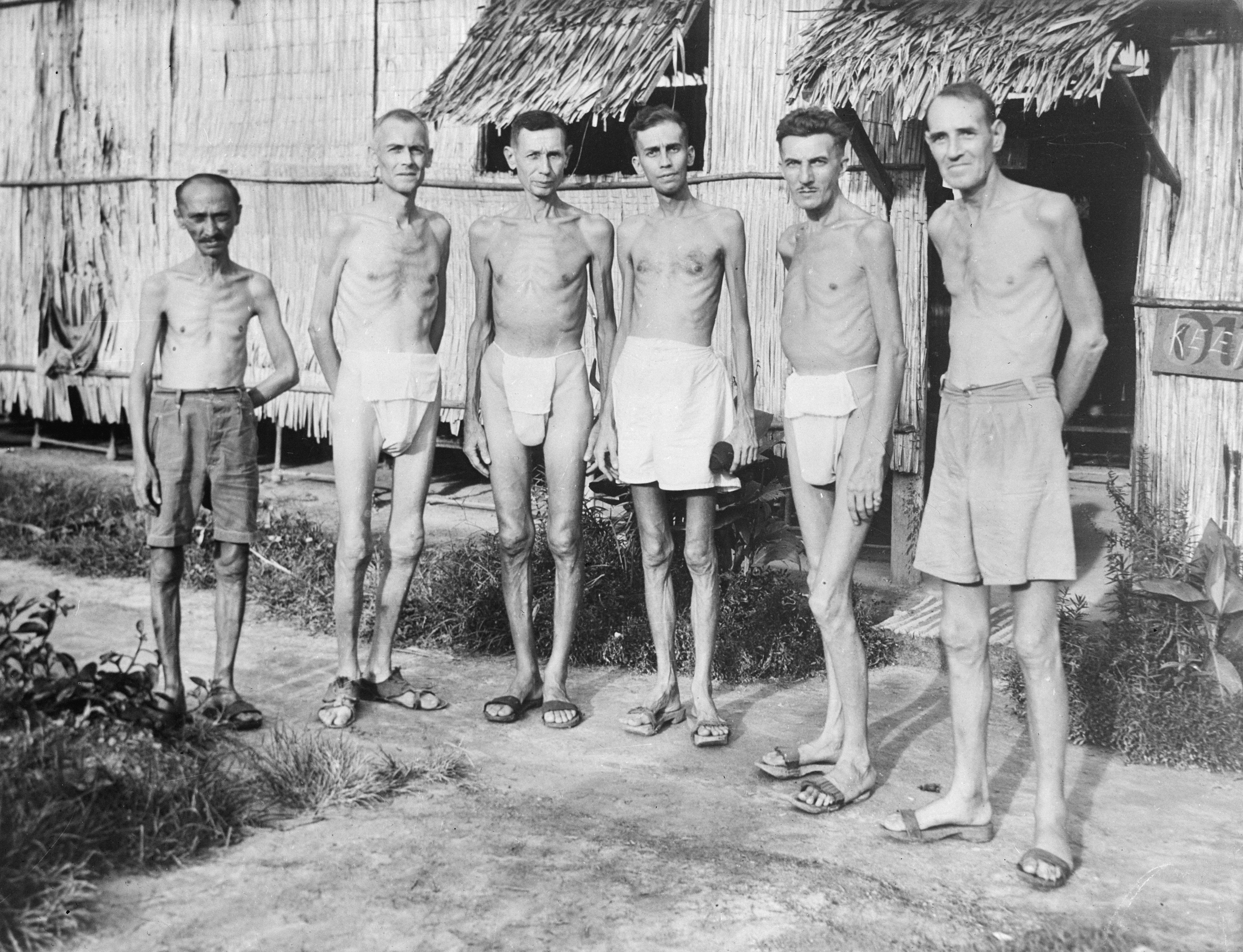
Dutch prisoners liberated from a Japanese camp in 1945

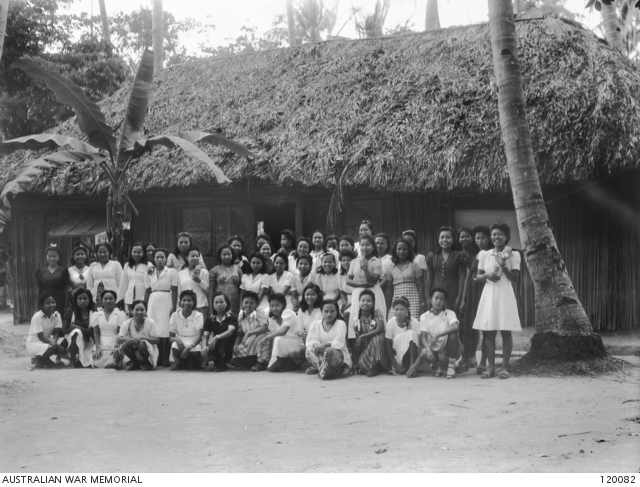
Javanese girls liberated by Australian troops from a Japanese brothel in Koepang, Timor, October 1945

Following the Japanese surrender in August 1945, nationalist leaders Sukarno and Mohammad Hatta declared Indonesian independence. A four-and-a-half-year struggle followed as the Dutch tried to re-establish their colony; although Dutch forces re-occupied most of Indonesia's territory a guerrilla struggle ensued, and the majority of Indonesians, and ultimately international opinion, favoured Indonesian independence. The Netherlands committed war crimes: summary and arbitrary killings of Indonesian villagers and farmers, torture of Indonesian prisoners and execution of prisoners. Ad van Liempt documented the mass murder of 364 Indonesians by Dutch soldiers in the village of Galoeng Galoeng. Alfred Edelstein and Karin van Coevorden, documented later the execution of hundreds of men in the village of Rawagede. The independence movement during the later phases of the Bersiap also targeted Dutch and Eurasian civilians, particularly under the direction of Sutomo who personally supervised the summary executions of hundreds of civilians.

After the political situation in Indonesia devolved into a deadlock the new Dutch government, led by Louis Beel of the Catholic People's Party, formed a Commissie-Generaal voor Nederlands-Indië (Commission General for the Dutch Indies) on 14 September 1946. This Commission-General consisted of Willem Schermerhorn, Dutch Prime Minister from 1945 to 1946; F. De Boer, Liberal politician; Max van Poll, Catholic Party politician; and Hubertus van Mook, Lieutenant-Governor General (ex officio). The Commission achieved a cease-fire on 14 October (a month after its arrival in Batavia) and a draft agreement on 15 November with the negotiators for the Republik Sutan Sjahrir, Prime Minister, Amir Sjarifuddin, Defense Minister, and Johannes Leimena, Junior Minister of Health, chairman of the Indonesian Christian Party. This so-called Linggadjati Agreement was first "elucidated" by the Dutch Minister of Foreign Affairs Jan Jonkman on 10 December, and in this form accepted by the Dutch Parliament on 20 December 1946. It was formally signed by the parties on 25 March 1947 in Djakarta, with the Indonesian side rejecting the "elucidation".

After this high point in the relations between the two countries, the situation rapidly deteriorated. On both sides more extreme parties got the upper hand. The Dutch unilaterally instituted an interim government for the colony on a "federal" basis, with representation for the parts of the colony not represented by the Republik. This was unacceptable to Sukarno. Sjahrir proposed a compromise, but this was rejected by the Dutch. Sjahrir resigned and was replaced by Sjarifuddin. Sukarno declared a state of emergency in the areas that were in the hands of the Republik and assumed charge of the negotiations. The situation deteriorated further, and the Dutch resorted to military intervention under Operation Product (or first "politionele actie"). The Commission General was dissolved on 15 November 1947 after Schermerhorn and Van Poll resigned. The Politionele Actie did not achieve its goals, and international pressure forced the Dutch government to accept a cease-fire and the Renville Agreement (17 January 1948). This agreement, however, did not lead to a solution. Provocative actions from both sides led to a tense military situation, and the Dutch for the second time resorted to military intervention with the second politionele actie, or Operation Kraai, in December 1948. This was militarily successful (the Dutch managed to capture Sukarno), but again international political pressure forced the Dutch to back down and be party to the Roem–Van Roijen Agreement (7 May 1949). The Dutch–Indonesian Round Table Conference then started on 22 August 1949, which led to the agreement to transfer sovereignty to a Republic of the United States of Indonesia.

In December 1949 the Netherlands formally recognised Indonesian sovereignty with the exception of the Dutch New Guinea (Western New Guinea). Sukarno's government campaigned for Indonesian control of the territory, and with pressure from the United States, the Netherlands agreed to the New York Agreement which ceded the territory to Indonesian administration in May 1963.

In 2013 the Netherlands government apologised for the violence used against the Indonesian people, an apology repeated by King Willem-Alexander on a state visit in 2020. To this day, the colonial war is commonly referred to as "police actions" in the Netherlands.

== Government ==
=== Law and administration ===
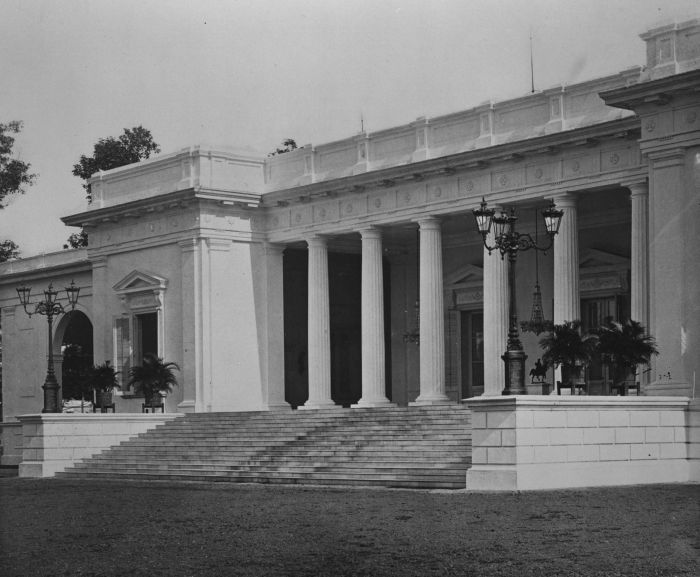
The governor-general's palace in Batavia (1880–1900)

Since the VOC era, the highest Dutch authority in the colony resided with the office of the governor-general. During the Dutch East Indies era the governor-general functioned as chief executive president of colonial government and served as commander-in-chief of the colonial army (KNIL). Until 1903 all government officials and organisations were formal agents of the governor-general and were entirely dependent on the central administration of the 'office of the governor-general' for their budgets. Until 1815 the governor-general had the absolute right to ban, censor or restrict any publication in the colony. The so-called exorbitant powers of the governor-general allowed him to exile anyone regarded as subversive and dangerous to peace and order, without involving any Court of Law.

Until 1848 the governor-general was directly appointed by the Dutch monarch, and in later years via the Crown and on advice of the Dutch metropolitan cabinet. During two periods (1815–1835 and 1854–1925) the governor-general ruled jointly with an advisory board called the Raad van Indie (Indies Council). Colonial policy and strategy were the responsibility of the Ministry of Colonies based in The Hague. From 1815 to 1848 the ministry was under direct authority of the Dutch king. In the 20th century the colony gradually developed as a state distinct from the Dutch metropole with its treasury separated in 1903, public loans being contracted by the colony from 1913, and quasi-diplomatic ties were established with Arabia to manage the Haji pilgrimage from the Dutch East Indies. In 1922 the colony came on equal footing with the Netherlands in the Dutch constitution, while remaining under the Ministry of Colonies.

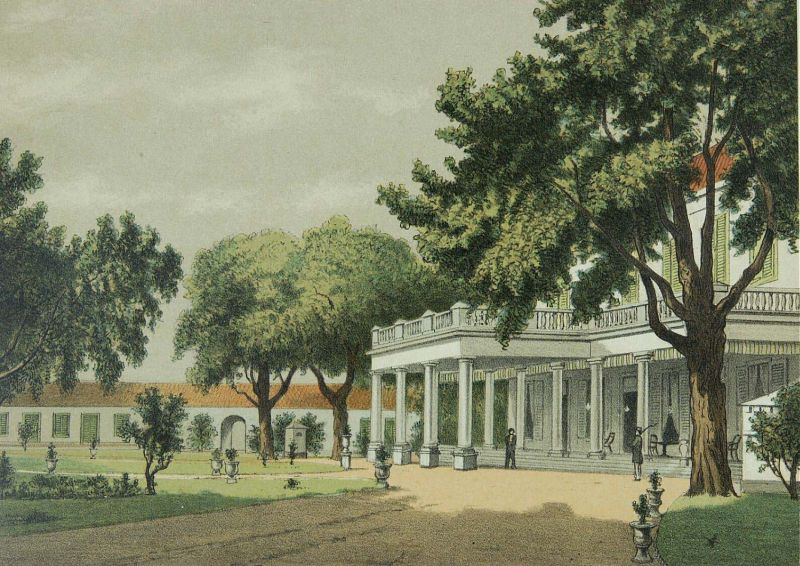
House of the Resident (colonial administrator) in Surabaya

The governor-general led a hierarchy of Dutch officials: the residents, the assistant residents, and district officers called controllers. Traditional rulers who survived displacement by the Dutch conquests were installed as regents and indigenous aristocracy became an indigenous civil service. While they lost de facto control, their wealth and splendour under the Dutch grew. This indirect rule did not disturb the peasantry and was cost-effective for the Dutch; in 1900, only 250 European and 1,500 indigenous civil servants, and 16,000 Dutch officers and men and 26,000 hired native troops, were required to rule 35 million colonial subjects. From 1910, the Dutch created the most centralised state power in Southeast Asia. Politically, the highly centralised power structure established by the Dutch administration, including the exorbitant powers of exile and censorship, was carried over into the new Indonesian republic.

A People's Council called the Volksraad for the Dutch East Indies commenced in 1918. The Volksraad was limited to an advisory role and only a small portion of the indigenous population was able to vote for its members. The council comprised 30 indigenous members, 25 European and 5 from Chinese and other populations, and was reconstituted every four years. In 1925 the Volksraad was made a semilegislative body; although decisions were still made by the Dutch government, the governor-general was expected to consult the Volksraad on major issues. The Volksraad was dissolved in 1942 during the Japanese occupation.

The legal system was divided by the three main ethnic groups classified under the Dutch colonial administration— Europeans, Foreign Orientals (Arabs and the Chinese) and the indigenous— which were subject to their own legal systems that were all simultaneously in force.

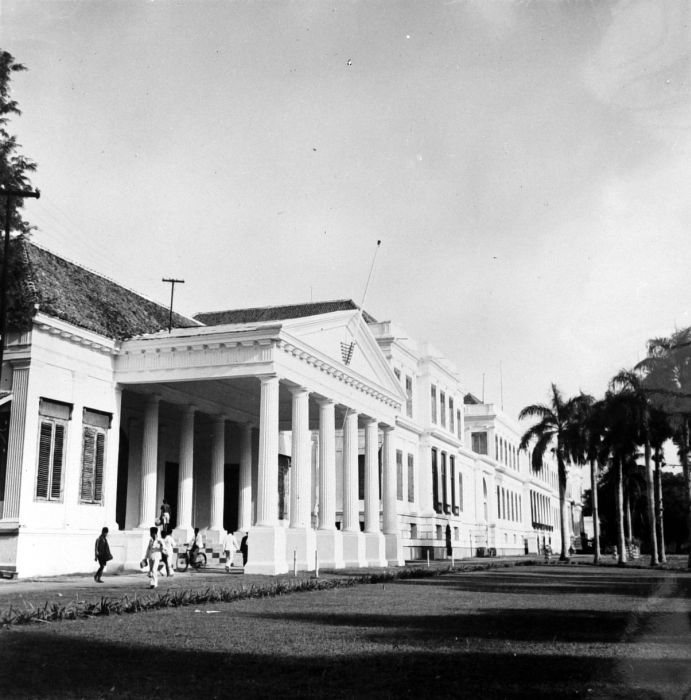
The Supreme Court Building, Batavia

The Dutch government adapted the Dutch codes of law in its colony. The highest court of law, the Supreme Court in Batavia, dealt with appeals and monitored judges and courts throughout the colony. Six councils of justice (Raad van Justitie) dealt mostly with crime committed by people in the European legal class (Note: Note: The European legal class was not solely based on race restrictions and included Dutch people, other Europeans, but also native Indo-Europeans, Indo-Chinese and indigenous people.) and only indirectly with the indigenous population. The land councils (Landraden) dealt with civil matters and less serious offences like estate divorces, and matrimonial disputes. The indigenous population was subject to their respective adat law and to indigenous regents and district courts, unless cases were escalated before Dutch judges. (Note: Note: Adat law communities were formally established throughout the archipelago e.g. Minangkabau. See: Cribb, R.B., Kahin, p. 140) Following Indonesian independence, the Dutch legal system was adopted and gradually a national legal system based on Indonesian precepts of law and justice was established.

By 1920 the Dutch had established 350 prisons throughout the colony. The Meester Cornelis prison in Batavia incarcerated the unruliest inmates. In the Sawahlunto prison on Sumatra prisoners had to perform manual labour in the coal mines. Separate prisons were built for juveniles (West Java) and for women. In the Bulu women's prison in Semarang inmates had the opportunity to learn a profession during their detention, such as sewing, weaving and making batik. This training was held in high esteem and helped re-socialise women once they were outside the correctional facility. (Note: Note: The Bulu women's prison in Semarang, which housed both European and indigenous women, had separate sleeping rooms with cots and mosquito nets for elite indigenous women and women in the European legal class. Sleeping on the floor like the female peasantry was considered an intolerable aggravation of the legal sanction.) In response to the communist uprising of 1926 the prison camp Boven-Digoel was established in New Guinea. As of 1927, political prisoners, including indigenous Indonesians espousing Indonesian independence, were 'exiled' to the outer islands.

=== Administrative divisions ===
The Dutch East Indies was divided into three gouvernementen—Groot Oost, Borneo and Sumatra—and three provincies in Java. Provincies and gouvernementen were both divided into residencies, but while the residencies under the provincies were divided again into regentschappen, residencies under gouvernementen were divided into afdeelingen first before being subdivided into regentschappen. However, it was fundamentally a unitary state.

== Armed forces ==
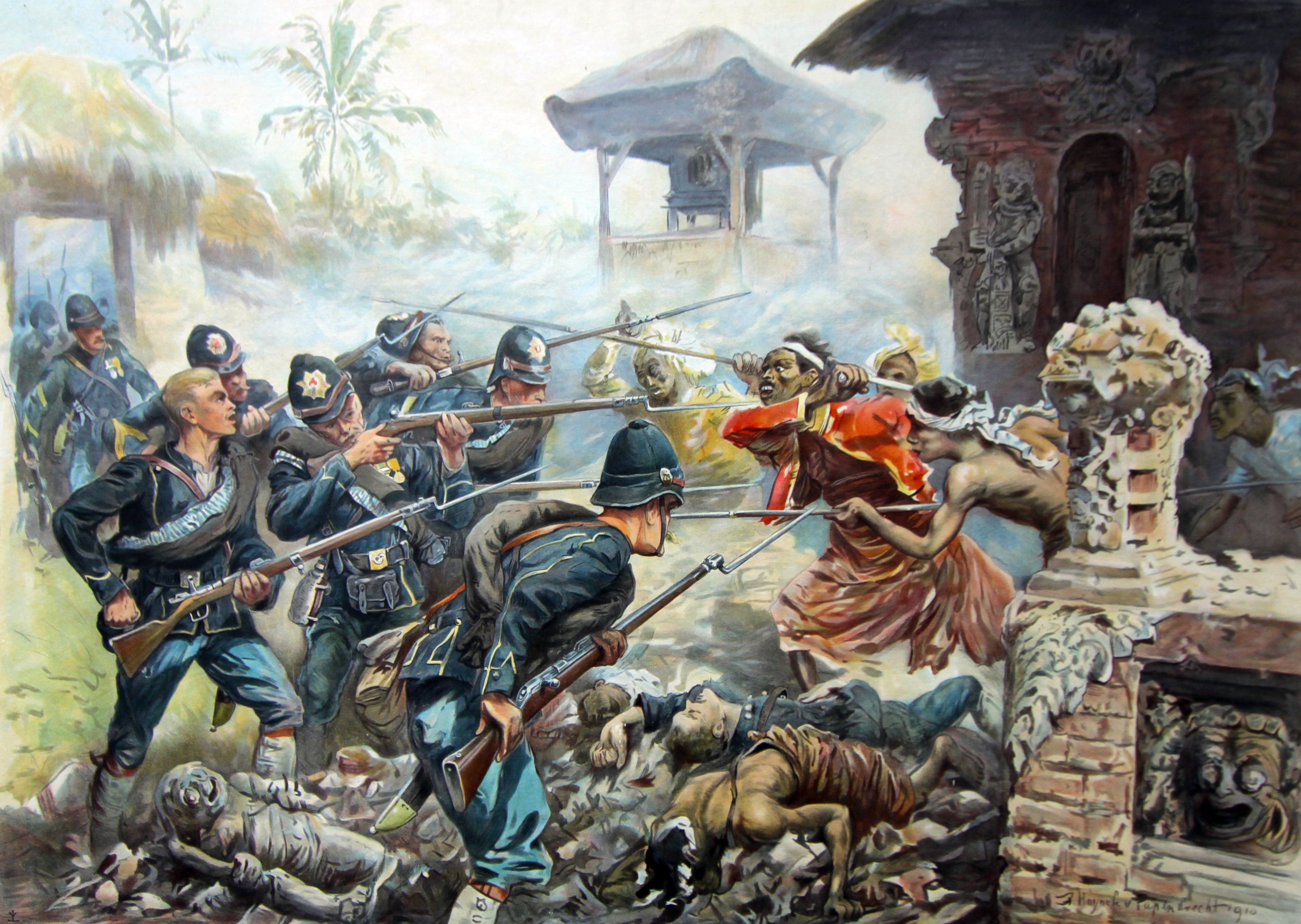
Dutch intervention in Lombok and Karangasem, 1894.

The Royal Netherlands East Indies Army (KNIL) and its air arm, the Royal Netherlands East Indies Army Air Force (ML-KNIL), were established in 1814 and 1915, respectively. Naval forces of the Royal Netherlands Navy (RNLN), such as the Dutch East Indies Squadron, were based in Surabaya, supplemented by the colonial Government Navy and Indies Military Navy.

The KNIL was not part of the Royal Netherlands Army, but a separate military arm commanded by the governor-general and funded by the colonial budget. The KNIL was not allowed to recruit Dutch conscripts and had the nature of a 'Foreign Legion' recruiting not only Dutch volunteers, but many other European nationalities (especially German, Belgian and Swiss mercenaries). While most officers were Europeans, the majority of soldiers were indigenous Indonesians, the largest contingent of which were Javanese and Sundanese. Indigenous Indonesians were also present in the naval forces that the Netherlands maintained in the Dutch East indies. By 1850 the RNLN had 500 indigenous sailors and this number would continue to increase over the following decades.

Dutch policy before the 1870s was to take full charge of strategic points and work out treaties with the local leaders elsewhere so they would remain in control and co-operate. The policy failed in Aceh, in northern Sumatra, where the Sultan tolerated pirates who raided commerce in the Strait of Malacca. Britain was a protector of Aceh and it granted the Dutch request to conduct their anti-piracy campaign. The campaign quickly drove out the Sultan, but across Aceh numerous local Muslim leaders mobilised and fought the Dutch in four decades of expensive guerrilla war, with high levels of atrocities on both sides. Colonial military authorities tried to forestall a war against the population by means of a 'strategy of awe'. When a guerrilla war did take place the Dutch used either a slow, violent occupation or a campaign of destruction.

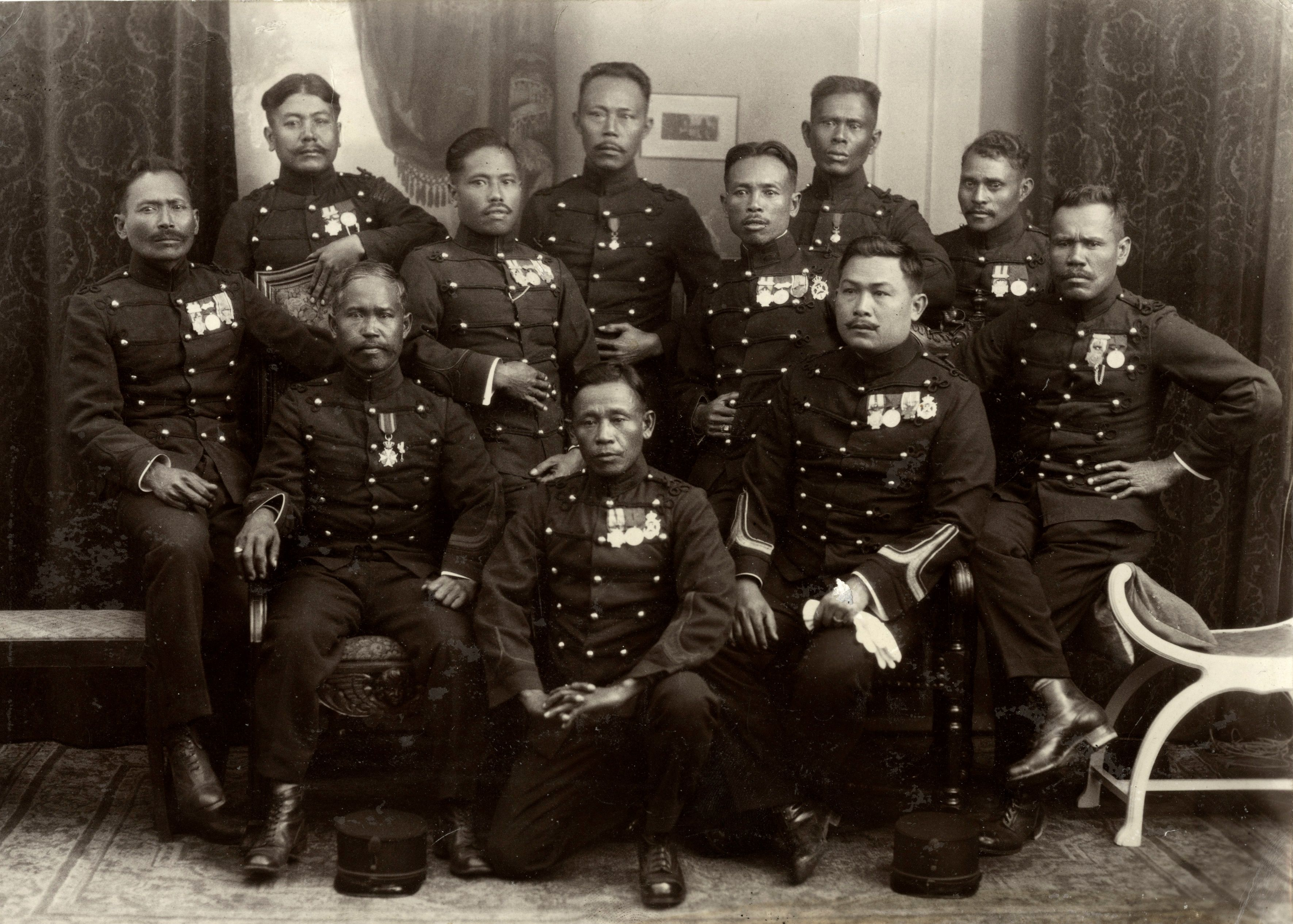
Decorated indigenous KNIL soldiers, 1927

By 1900 the archipelago was considered "pacified" and the KNIL was mainly involved with military police tasks. The nature of the KNIL changed in 1917 when the colonial government introduced obligatory military service for all male conscripts in the European legal class and in 1922 a supplemental legal enactment introduced the creation of a 'Home guard' (Dutch: Landstorm) for European conscripts older than 32. Petitions by Indonesian nationalists to establish military service for indigenous people were rejected. In July 1941 the Volksraad passed law creating a native militia of 18,000 by a majority of 43 to 4, with only the moderate Great Indonesia Party objecting. After the declaration of war with Japan, over 100,000 natives volunteered. The KNIL hastily and inadequately attempted to transform them into a modern military force able to protect the Dutch East Indies from Imperial Japanese invasion. On the eve of the Japanese invasion in December 1941, Dutch regular troops in the East Indies comprised about 1,000 officers and 34,000 men, of whom 28,000 were indigenous. During the Dutch East Indies campaign of 1941–42 the KNIL and the Allied forces were quickly defeated. All European soldiers, which in practice included all able bodied Indo-European males, were interned by the Japanese as POWs. Twenty-five percent of the POWs did not survive their internment. During the Pacific War around 500 Indonesian sailors died while serving in the RNLN.

Following World War II, a reconstituted KNIL joined with Dutch Army troops to re-establish colonial "law and order". Despite two successful military campaigns in 1947 and 1948–1949, Dutch efforts to re-establish their colony failed and the Netherlands recognised Indonesian sovereignty in December 1949. The KNIL was disbanded by 26 July 1950 with its indigenous personnel being given the option of demobilising or joining the Indonesian National Armed Forces. At the time of disbandment the KNIL numbered 65,000, of whom 26,000 were incorporated into the new Indonesian Army. The remainder were either demobilised or transferred to the Netherlands Army. Key officers in the Indonesian military that were former KNIL soldiers included: Suharto, second president of Indonesia; A. H. Nasution, commander of the Siliwangi Division and Chief of Staff of the Indonesian army; and A. E. Kawilarang, founder of the elite special forces Kopassus.

== Demographics ==
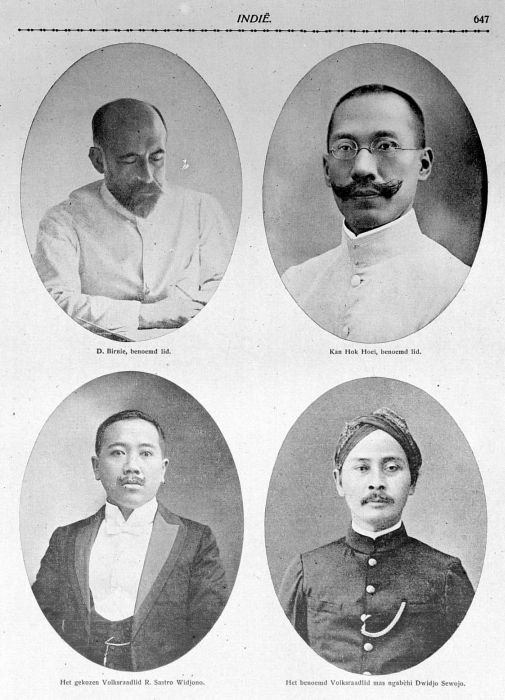
Volksraad members in 1918: D. Birnie (Dutch), Kan Hok Hoei (Chinese), R. Sastro Widjono and M. N. Dwidjo Sewojo (Javanese)

In 1898, the population of Java numbered 28 million with another 7 million on Indonesia's outer islands. The first half of 20th century saw large-scale immigration of Dutch and other Europeans to the colony, where they worked in either the government or private sectors. By 1930, there were more than 240,000 people with European legal status in the colony, making up less than 0.5% of the total population. Almost 75% of these Europeans were in fact native Eurasians known as Indo-Europeans.

=== Ethnic groups ===
1930 census of the Dutch East Indies
Rank	Group	Number	Percentage
1	Indigenous islanders (Pribumi)	59,138,067	97.4%
2	Chinese	1,233,214	2.0%
3	Dutch people and Eurasians	240,417	0.4%
4	Other foreign orientals	115,535	0.2%
	Total	60,727,233	100%

The Dutch colonialists formed a privileged upper social class of soldiers, administrators, managers, teachers and pioneers. They lived together with the natives, but at the top of a rigid social and racial caste system. The Dutch East Indies had two legal classes of citizens; European and indigenous. A third class, Foreign Easterners, was added in 1920.

In 1901 the Dutch adopted what they called the Ethical Policy, under which the colonial government had a duty to further the welfare of the Indonesian people in health and education. Other new measures under the policy included irrigation programs, transmigration, communications, flood mitigation, industrialisation and protection of native industry. Industrialisation did not significantly affect the majority of Indonesians, and Indonesia remained an agricultural colony; by 1930, there were 17 cities with populations over 50,000 and their combined populations numbered 1.87 million of the colony's 60 million.

== Education ==
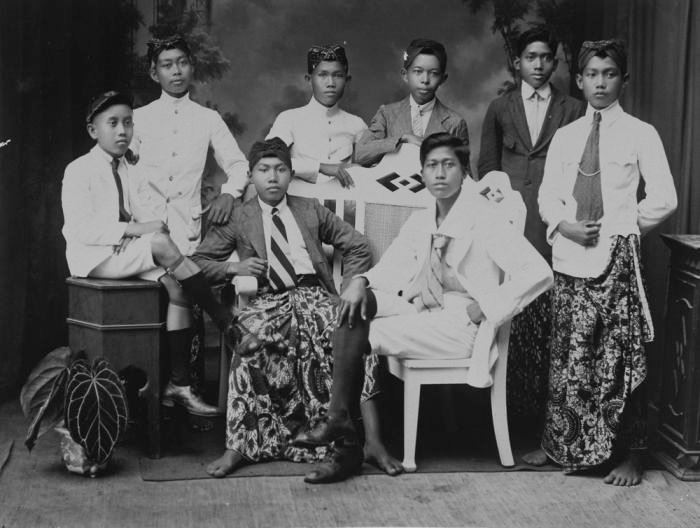
Students of the School Tot Opleiding Van Indische Artsen (STOVIA) aka Sekolah Doctor Jawa

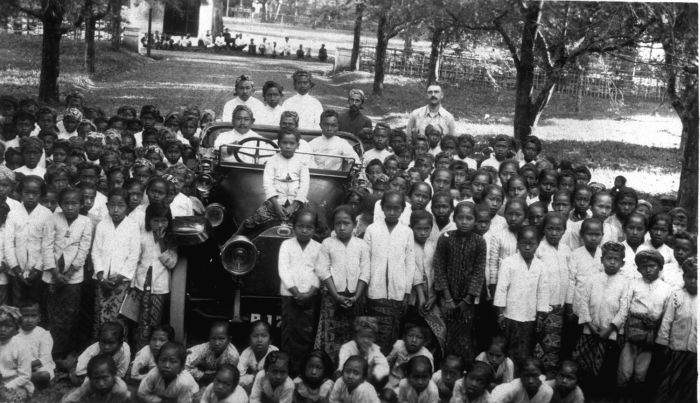
Dutch East Indies elementary school in Pamengpeuk Garut West Java

The Dutch school system was extended to Indonesians with the most prestigious schools admitting Dutch children and those of the Indonesian upper class. A second tier of schooling was based on ethnicity with separate schools for Indonesians, Arabs, and Chinese being taught in Dutch and with a Dutch curriculum. Ordinary Indonesians were educated in Malay in Roman alphabet with "link" schools preparing bright Indonesian students for entry into the Dutch-language schools. Vocational schools and programs were set up by the Indies government to train indigenous Indonesians for specific roles in the colonial economy. Chinese and Arabs, officially termed "foreign orientals", could not enrol in either the vocational schools or primary schools.

Graduates of Dutch schools opened their own schools modelled on the Dutch school system, as did Christian missionaries, Theosophical Societies and Indonesian cultural associations. This proliferation of schools was further boosted by new Muslim schools in the Western mould that also offered secular subjects. According to the 1930 census, 6% of Indonesians were literate; however, this figure recognised only graduates from Western schools and those who could read and write in a language in the Roman alphabet. It did not include graduates of non-Western schools or those who could read but not write Arabic, Malay or Dutch, or those who could write in non-Roman alphabets such as Batak, Javanese, Chinese or Arabic.

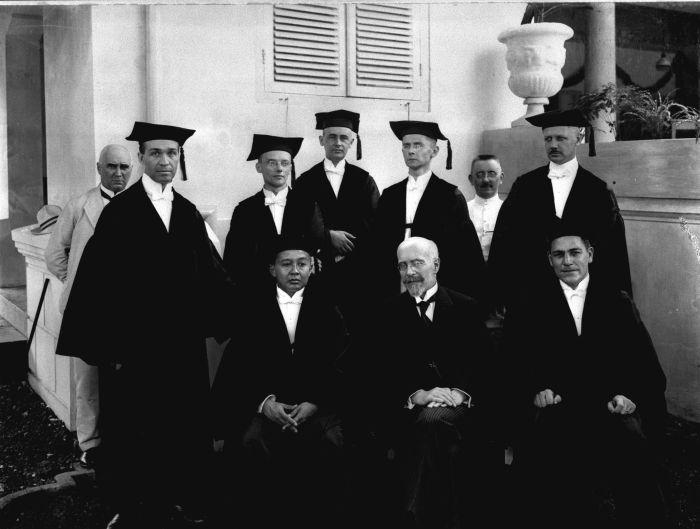
Dutch, Eurasian and Javanese professors of law at the opening of the Rechts Hogeschool in 1924

Some higher education institutions were also established. In 1898 the Dutch East Indies government established a school to train medical doctors, named School tot Opleiding van Inlandsche Artsen (STOVIA). Many STOVIA graduates later played important roles in Indonesia's national movement toward independence as well in developing medical education in Indonesia, such as Dr. Wahidin Soedirohoesodo, who established the Budi Utomo political society. De Technische Hogeschool te Bandung was established in 1920 by the Dutch colonial administration to meet the needs of technical resources at its colony. One Technische Hogeschool graduate was Sukarno, whom later would lead the Indonesian National Revolution. In 1924, the colonial government again decided to open a new tertiary-level educational facility, the Rechts Hogeschool (RHS), to train civilian officers and servants. In 1927, STOVIA's status was changed to that of a full tertiary-level institution and its name was changed to Geneeskundige Hogeschool (GHS). The GHS occupied the same main building and used the same teaching hospital as the current Faculty of Medicine of University of Indonesia. The old links between the Netherlands and Indonesia are still clearly visible in such technological areas as irrigation design. To this day, the ideas of Dutch colonial irrigation engineers continue to exert a strong influence over Indonesian design practices. Moreover, the two highest-internationally ranking universities of Indonesia— the University of Indonesia, established in 1898, and the Bandung Institute of Technology, established in 1920— were both founded during the colonial era. (Note: Note: In 2010, according to University Ranking by Academic Performance (URAP), Universitas Indonesia was the best university in Indonesia.)

Education reforms, and modest political reform, resulted in a small elite of highly educated indigenous Indonesians, who promoted the idea of an independent and unified "Indonesia" that would bring together disparate indigenous groups of the Dutch East Indies. A period termed the Indonesian National Revival, the first half of the 20th century saw the nationalist movement develop strongly, but also face Dutch oppression.

== Economy ==
The economic history of the colony was closely related to the economic health of the Netherlands. Despite increasing returns from the Dutch land tax system, Dutch finances had been severely affected by the cost of the Java War and the Padri War, and the Dutch loss of Belgium in 1830 brought the Netherlands to the brink of bankruptcy. In 1830, a new governor-general, Johannes van den Bosch, was appointed to exploit the Indies through Dutch appropriation of its resources. With the Dutch achieving political domination throughout Java for the first time in 1830, it was then possible to introduce an agricultural policy of government-controlled forced cultivation. Termed cultuurstelsel (cultivation system) in Dutch and tanam paksa (forced plantation) in Indonesia, farmers were required to deliver, as a form of tax, fixed amounts of specified crops, such as sugar or coffee. Much of Java became a Dutch plantation and revenue rose continually through the 19th century, which was reinvested into the Netherlands to save it from bankruptcy. Between 1830 and 1870, 840 million guilder (€8 billion in 2018) were taken from the East Indies, on average making a third of the annual Dutch government budget. The Cultivation System, however, brought much economic hardship to Javanese peasants, who suffered famine and epidemics in the 1840s.

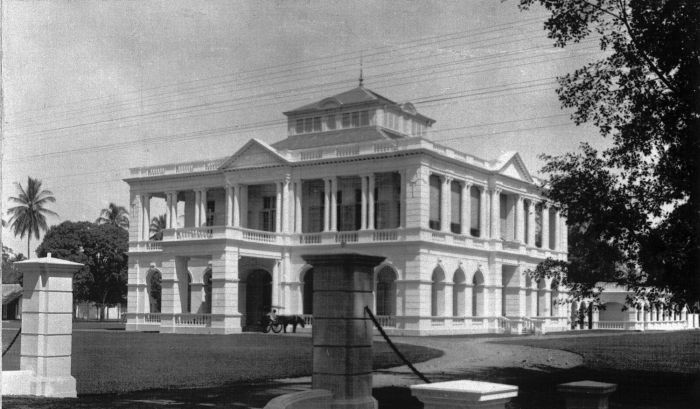
Headquarters of the Deli Company in Medan circa 1925

Critical public opinion in the Netherlands led to much of the Cultivation System's excesses being eliminated under the agrarian reforms of the "Liberal Period". According to one study, the mortality rate in Java would have been 10–20% higher by the late 1870s if the system of forced labour had not been abolished. Dutch private capital flowed in after 1850, especially in tin mining and plantation estate agriculture. The Martavious Company's tin mines off the eastern Sumatra coast was financed by a syndicate of Dutch entrepreneurs, including the younger brother of King William III. Mining began in 1860. In 1863 Jacob Nienhuys obtained a concession from the Sultanate of Deli (East Sumatra) for a large tobacco estate (Deli Company). From 1870, the Indies were opened up to private enterprise. Due to the exploitation of Chinese migrant labourers, or coolies, Dutch businessmen were able to set up large, profitable plantations. Sugar production doubled between 1870 and 1885; new crops such as tea and cinchona flourished, and rubber was introduced, leading to dramatic increases in Dutch profits. Changes were not limited to Java, or agriculture; oil from Sumatra and Kalimantan became a valuable resource for industrialising Europe. Dutch commercial interests expanded off Java to the outer islands with increasingly more territory coming under direct Dutch control or dominance in the latter half of the 19th century. However, the resulting scarcity of land for rice production, combined with dramatically increasing populations, especially in Java, led to further hardships.

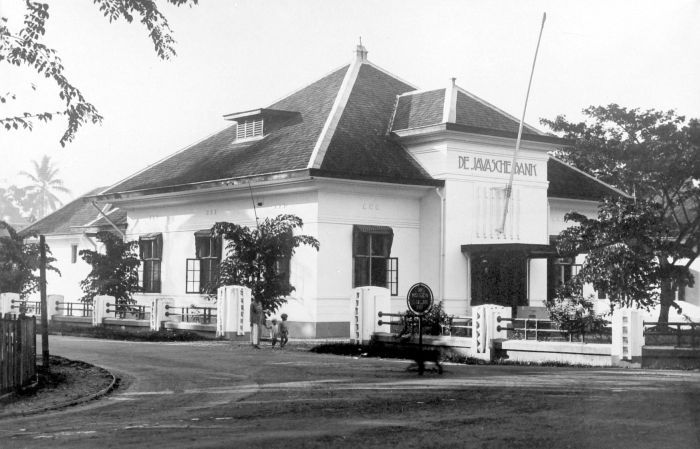
De Javasche Bank in Banjarmasin

The colonial exploitation of Indonesia's population and wealth contributed to the industrialisation of the Netherlands, while simultaneously laying the foundation for the industrialisation of Indonesia. The Dutch introduced coffee, tea, cacao, tobacco and rubber, and large expanses of Java became plantations cultivated by Javanese peasants, collected by Chinese intermediaries, and sold on overseas markets by European merchants. In the late 19th century economic growth was based on heavy world demand for tea, coffee and cinchona. The government invested heavily in a railroad network (240 km or 150 mi long in 1873, 1,900 km or 1,200 mi in 1900), as well as telegraph lines, and entrepreneurs opened banks, shops and newspapers. The Dutch East Indies produced most of the world's supply of quinine and pepper, over a third of its rubber, a quarter of its coconut products, and a fifth of its tea, sugar, coffee and oil. The profit from the Dutch East Indies made the Netherlands one of the world's most significant colonial powers. The Koninklijke Paketvaart-Maatschappij shipping line supported the unification of the colonial economy and brought inter-island shipping through to Batavia, rather than through Singapore, thus focusing more economic activity on Java.

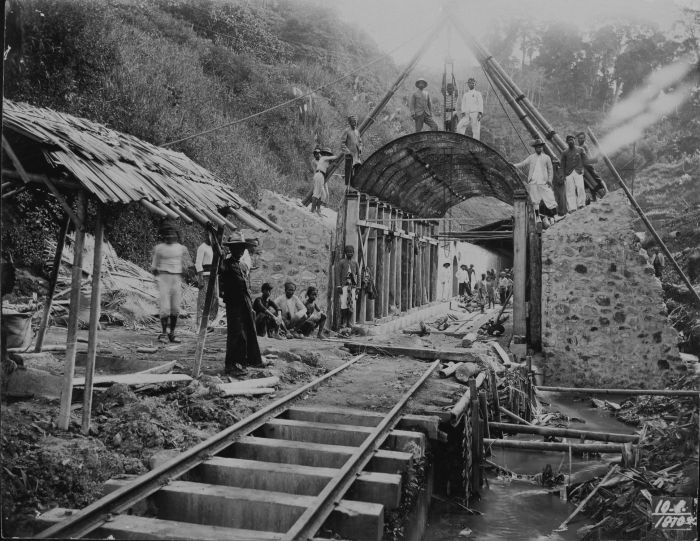
Workers pose at the site of a railway tunnel under construction in the mountains, 1910

The worldwide recession of the late 1880s and early 1890s saw the commodity prices on which the colony depended collapse. Journalists and civil servants observed that the majority of the Indies population were no better off than under the previous regulated Cultivation System economy and tens of thousands starved. Commodity prices recovered from the recession, leading to increased investment in the colony. The sugar, tin, copra and coffee trade on which the colony had been built thrived, and rubber, tobacco, tea and oil also became principal exports. Political reform increased the autonomy of the local colonial administration, moving away from central control from the Netherlands, whilst power was also diverted from the central Batavia government to more localised governing units.

The world economy recovered in the late 1890s and prosperity returned. Foreign investment, especially by the British, were encouraged. By 1900, foreign-held assets in the Netherlands Indies totalled about 750 million guilders ($300 million), mostly in Java.

Besides slavery and forced plantation work, the Dutch added to the exploitation of the population by means of involuntary servitude. This started under the reign of governor-general Daendels who forced tens of thousands of locals to work on the construction of the great post road across Java and extended throughout the entire colonial period. During the 19th century, involuntary servitude was increased for the construction of roads and railroads, other infrastructure such as bridges and canals, and many other economic activities. Compulsory service could be enforced to fifty-two days per year per person. On Java and Madura combined, the total number of forced labour was some twenty millions days around 1895. Another source of free labour was obtained through the penal system. The local population was subjected to police law, by which local administrators could sentence minor offenders directly to forced labour, without any due process. Also, long term convicts were subjected to forced labour for constructing infrastructure, including irrigation works, work at coal and tin mines, agricultural production and deployed for military campaigns. The abolishment of forced labour of the cultuurstelsel was directly followed by a steep increase in short term sentencing to forced labour, from 70,000 persons in 1870 to 275,000 in 1900. In that same period the prison population also increased from 80,000 to 320,000 for prison labour and forced labour in especially coal mines. By 1950 a road network with 12,000 km of asphalted surface, 41,000 km of metalled road area and 16,000 km of gravel surfaces had been built. In addition 7,500 kilometres (4,700 mi) of railways, bridges, irrigation systems covering 1.4 million hectares (5,400 mi^{2}) of rice fields, several harbours, and 140 public drinking water systems had been built.

== Culture ==
=== Language and literature ===
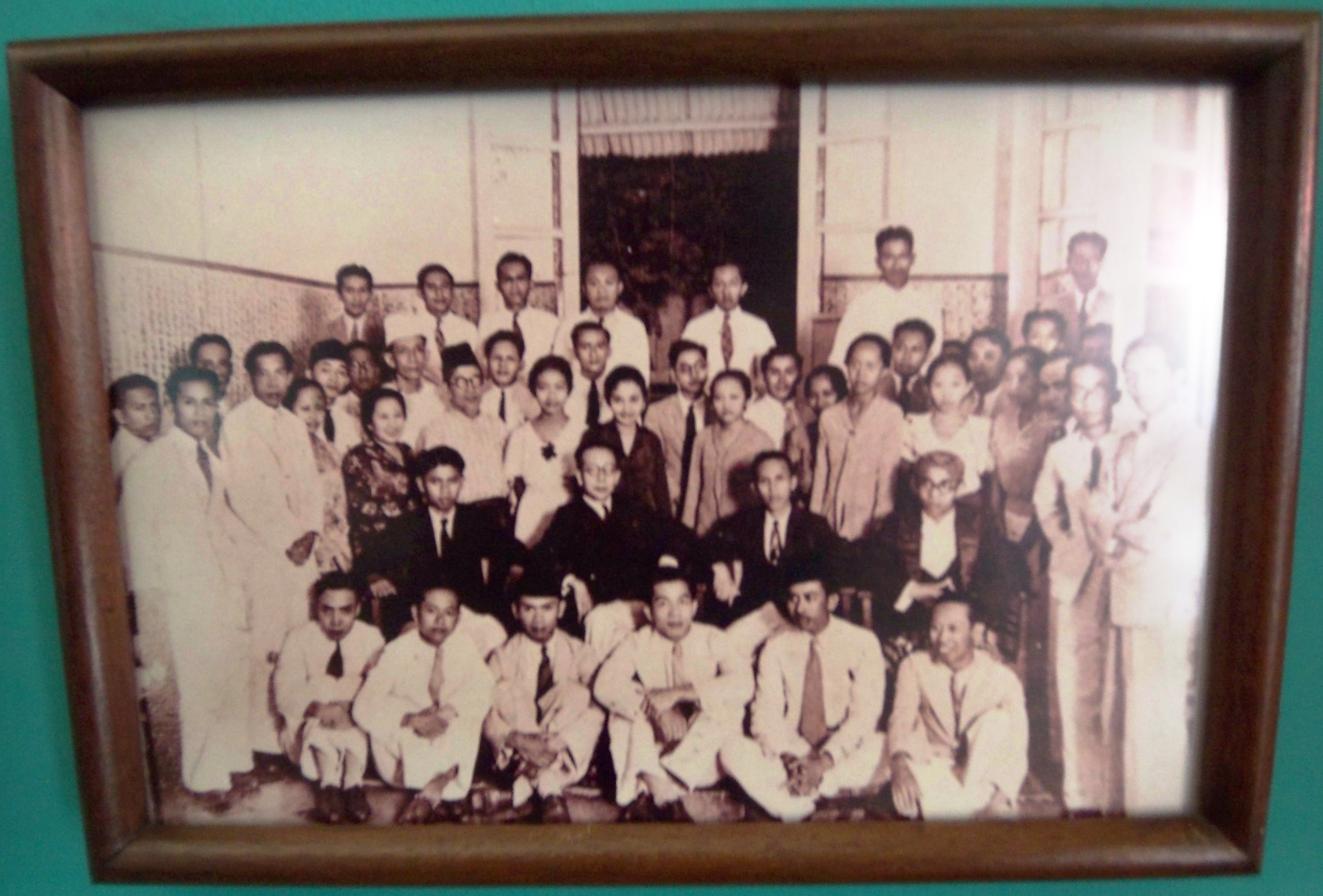
Perhimpunan Pelajar-Pelajar Indonesia (Indonesian Students Union) delegates in Youth Pledge, an important event where Indonesian language was decided to be the national language, 1928

Across the archipelago, hundreds of native languages are used, and Malay or Portuguese Creole, the existing languages of trade, were adopted. Prior to 1870, when Dutch colonial influence was largely restricted to Java, Malay was used in government schools and training programs such that graduates could communicate with groups from other regions who immigrated to Java. The colonial government sought to standardise Malay based on the version from Riau and Malacca, and dictionaries were commissioned for governmental communication and schools for indigenous peoples. In the early 20th century, Indonesia's independence leaders adopted a form of Malay from Riau, and called it Indonesian. In the latter half of the 19th century, the rest of the archipelago, in which hundreds of language groups were used, was brought under Dutch control. In extending the native education program to these areas, the government stipulated this "standard Malay" as the language of the colony.

Dutch was not made the official language of the colony and was not widely used by the indigenous Indonesian population. The majority of legally acknowledged Dutchmen were bilingual Indo-Eurasians. Dutch was used by only a limited educated elite, and in 1942, around two percent of the total population in the Dutch East Indies spoke Dutch, including over 1 million indigenous Indonesians. A number of Dutch loan words are used in present-day Indonesian, particularly technical terms (see List of Dutch loan words in Indonesian). These words generally had no alternative in Malay and were adopted into the Indonesian vocabulary giving a linguistic insight into which concepts are part of the Dutch colonial heritage. Hendrik Maier of the University of California says that about a fifth of the contemporary Indonesian language can be traced to Dutch.

Dutch language literature has been inspired by both colonial and postcolonial Indies from the Dutch Golden Age to the present day. It includes Dutch, Indo-European, and Indonesian authors. Its subject matter thematically revolves around the Dutch colonial era, but also includes postcolonial discourse. Masterpieces of this genre include Multatuli's Max Havelaar: Or The Coffee Auctions of the Dutch Trading Company, Louis Couperus's Hidden Force, E. du Perron's Country of Origin, and Maria Dermoût's The Ten Thousand Things. (Note: Note: In December 1958, American Time magazine praised the translation of Maria Dermoût's The Ten Thousand Things, and named it one of the best books of the year, among several (other) iconic literary works of 1958: Breakfast at Tiffany's by Truman Capote, Doctor Zhivago by Pasternak and Lolita by Nabokov.)

Most Dutch literature was written by Dutch and Indo-European authors. However, in the first half of the 20th century under the Ethical Policy, indigenous Indonesian authors and intellectuals came to the Netherlands to study and work. They wrote Dutch language literary works and published literature in literary reviews such as Het Getij, De Gemeenschap, Links Richten and Forum. By exploring new literary themes and focusing on indigenous protagonists, they drew attention to indigenous culture and the indigenous plight. Examples include the Javanese prince and poet Noto Soeroto, a writer and journalist, and the Dutch language writings of Soewarsih Djojopoespito, Chairil Anwar, Kartini, Sutan Sjahrir and Sukarno. Much of the postcolonial discourse in Dutch Indies literature has been written by Indo-European authors led by the "avant garde visionary" Tjalie Robinson, who is the best-read Dutch author in contemporary Indonesia, and second generation Indo-European immigrants such as Marion Bloem.

=== Visual art ===
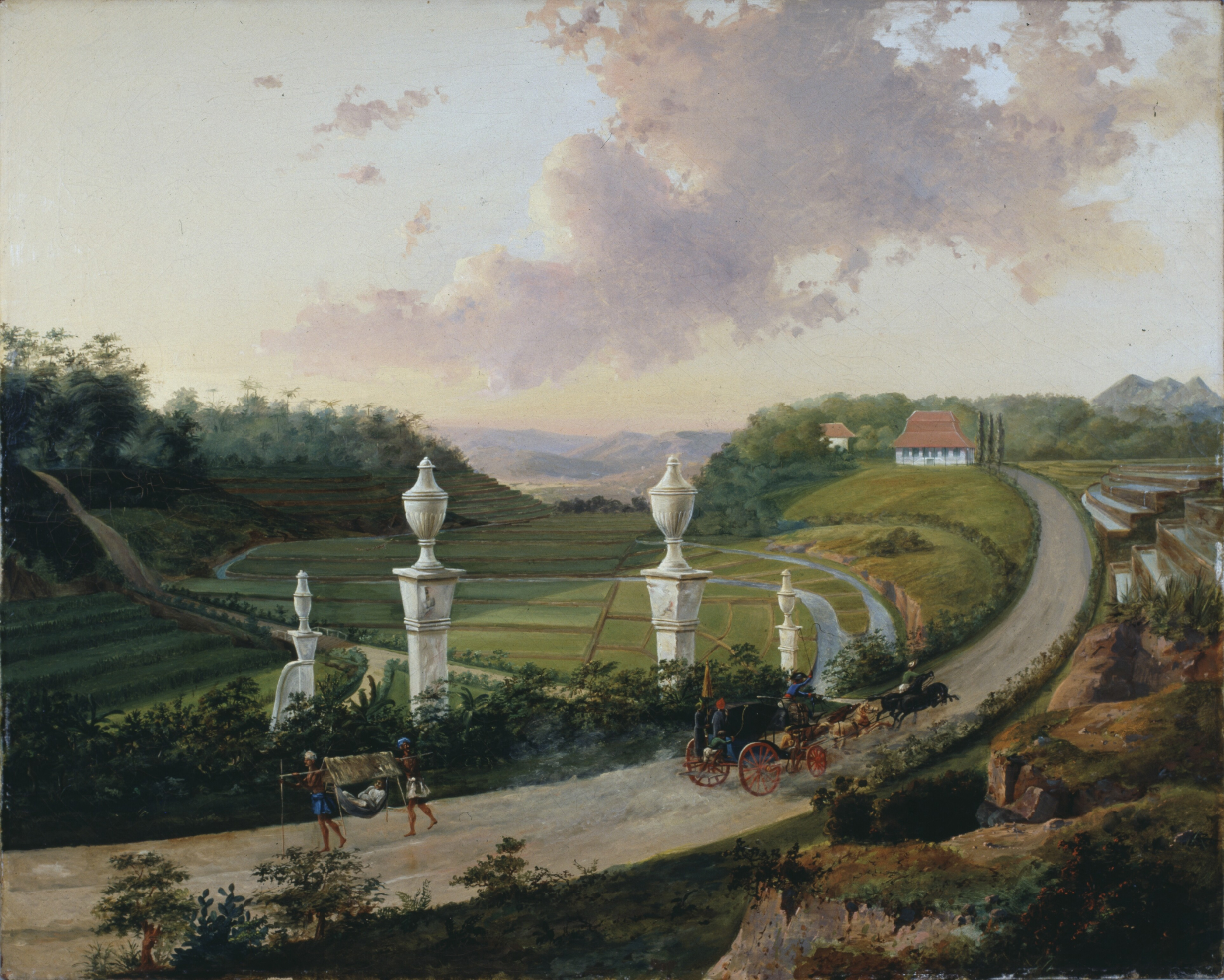
The romantic depiction of De Grote Postweg near Buitenzorg

The natural beauty of East Indies has inspired the works of artists and painters, that mostly capture the romantic scenes of colonial Indies. The term Mooi Indië (Dutch for "Beautiful Indies") was originally coined as the title of 12 reproductions of Du Chattel's watercolor paintings which depicted the scene of East Indies published in Amsterdam in 1930. The term became famous in 1939 after S. Sudjojono used it to mock the painters that merely depict all pretty things about Indies. Mooi Indië later would identified as the genre of painting that occurred during the colonial East Indies that capture the romantic depictions of the Indies as the main themes; mostly natural scenes of mountains, volcanoes, rice paddies, river valleys, villages, with scenes of native servants, nobles, and sometimes bare-chested native women. Some of the notable Mooi Indië painters are European artists: F. J. du Chattel, Manus Bauer, Nieuwkamp, Isaac Israel, PAJ Moojen, Carel Dake and Romualdo Locatelli; East Indies-born Dutch painters: Henry van Velthuijzen, Charles Sayers, Ernest Dezentje, Leonard Eland and Jan Frank; Native painters: Raden Saleh, Mas Pirngadi, Abdullah Suriosubroto, Wakidi, Basuki Abdullah, Mas Soeryo Soebanto and Henk Ngantunk; and also Chinese painters: Lee Man Fong, Oei Tiang Oen and Siauw Tik Kwie. These painters usually exhibit their works in art galleries such as Bataviasche Kuntkringgebouw, Theosofie Vereeniging, Kunstzaal Kolff & Co and Hotel Des Indes.

=== Theatre and film ===
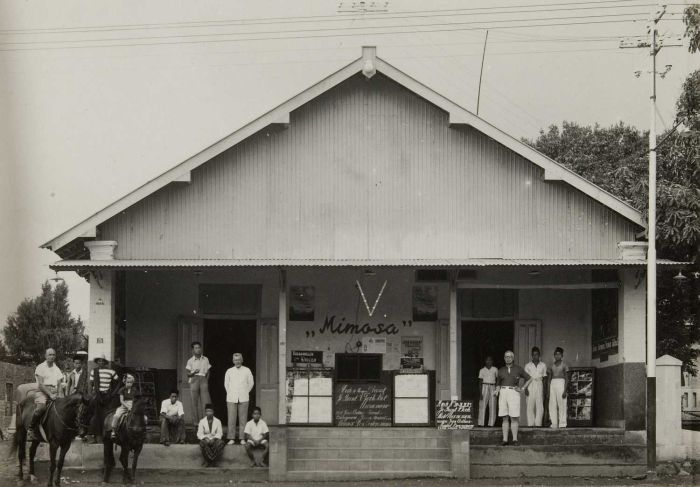
Bioscoop Mimosa cinema in Batu, Java, 1941

A total of 112 fictional films are known to have been produced in the Dutch East Indies between 1926 and the colony's dissolution in 1949. The earliest motion pictures, imported from abroad, were shown in late 1900, and by the early 1920s imported serials and fictional films were being shown, often with localised names. Dutch companies were also producing documentary films about the Indies to be shown in the Netherlands. The first locally produced film, Loetoeng Kasaroeng, was directed by L. Heuveldorp and released on 31 December 1926. Between 1926 and 1933 numerous other local productions were released. During the mid-1930s, production dropped as a result of the Great Depression. The rate of production declined again after the Japanese occupation beginning in early 1942, closing all but one film studio. The majority of films produced during the occupation were Japanese propaganda shorts. Following the Proclamation of Indonesian Independence in 1945 and during the ensuing revolution several films were made, by both pro-Dutch and pro-Indonesian backers.

Generally films produced in the Indies dealt with traditional stories or were adapted from existing works. The early films were silent, with Karnadi Anemer Bangkong (Karnadi the Frog Contractor; 1930) generally considered the first talkie; later films would be in Dutch, Malay, or an indigenous language. All were black-and-white. The American visual anthropologist Karl G. Heider writes that all films from before 1950 are lost. However, JB Kristanto's Katalog Film Indonesia (Indonesian Film Catalogue) records several as having survived at Sinematek Indonesia's archives, and Biran writes that several Japanese propaganda films have survived at the Netherlands Government Information Service.

Theatre plays by playwrights such as Victor Ido (1869–1948) were performed at the Schouwburg Weltevreden, now known as Gedung Kesenian Jakarta. A less elite form of theatre, popular with both European and indigenous people, were the travelling Indo theatre shows known as Komedie Stamboel, made popular by Auguste Mahieu (1865–1903).

=== Science ===
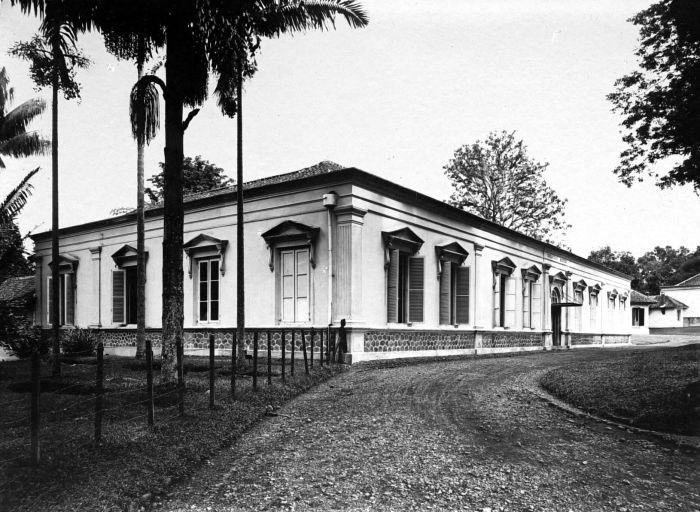
Museum and lab of the Buitenzorg Plantentuin

The rich nature and culture of the Dutch East Indies attracted European intellectuals, scientists and researchers. Some notable scientists that conducted most of their important research in the East Indies archipelago are Teijsmann, Junghuhn, Eijkman, Dubois and Wallace. Many important art, culture and science institutions were established in Dutch East Indies. For example, the Bataviaasch Genootschap van Kunsten en Wetenschappen (Royal Batavian Society of Arts and Sciences), the predecessor of the National Museum of Indonesia, was established in 1778 with the aim to promote research and publish findings in the field of arts and sciences, especially history, archaeology, ethnography and physics. The Bogor Botanical Gardens with Herbarium Bogoriense and Museum Zoologicum Bogoriense was a major centre for botanical research established in 1817, with the aim to study the flora and fauna of the archipelago.

Java Man was discovered by Eugène Dubois in 1891. The Komodo dragon was first described by Peter Ouwens in 1912, after an aeroplane crash accident in 1911 and rumours about living dinosaurs in Komodo Island in 1910. Vitamin B_{1} and its relation to beriberi disease was discovered by Eijkman during his work in the Indies.

With growing interest in scientific research, the government of the Dutch East Indies established the Natuurwetenschappelijke Raad voor Nederlandsch-Indië (Scientific Council of the Dutch East Indies) in 1928. It operated as the country's main research organization until the outbreak of World War II in Asia Pacific in 1942. In 1948 the institute was renamed Organisatie voor Natuurwetenschappelijk Onderzoek (Organisation for Scientific Research). This organization was the predecessor of the current Indonesian Institute of Sciences.

=== Cuisine ===
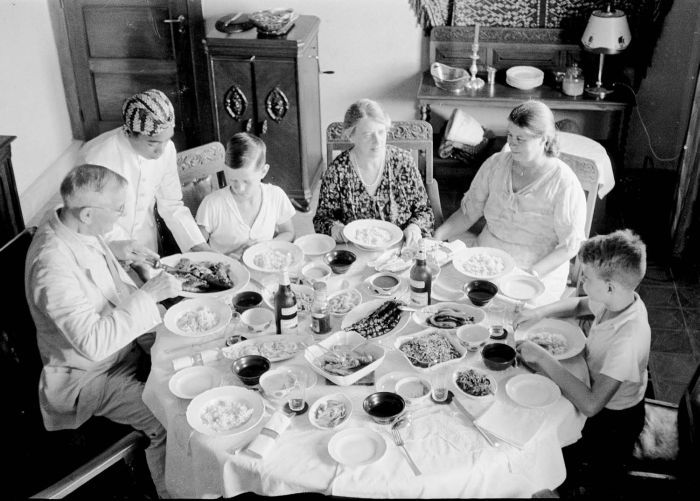
Dutch family enjoying a large Rijsttafel dinner, 1936

Dutch colonial families, through their domestic servants and cooks, were exposed to Indonesian cuisine, and as a result they developed a taste for native tropical spices and dishes. A notable Dutch East Indies colonial dish is rijsttafel, a rice table consisting of 7 to 40 popular dishes from across the colony. More an extravagant banquet than a dish, the Dutch colonials introduced the rice table not only so they could enjoy a wide array of dishes at a single setting but also to impress visitors with the exotic abundance of their colony.

Throughout the colonial period the Dutch introduced European dishes such as bread, cheese, barbecued steak and pancake. As the producer of cash crops; coffee and tea were also popular in the colonial East Indies. Bread, butter and margarine, sandwiches filled with ham, cheese or fruit jam, poffertjes, pannenkoek and Dutch cheeses were commonly consumed by colonial Dutch and Indos during the colonial era. Some of the native upperclass ningrat (nobles) and a few educated native were exposed to European cuisine, and it was held with high esteem as the cuisine of upperclass elite of Dutch East Indies society. This led to the adoption and fusion of European cuisine into Indonesian cuisine. Some dishes which were created during the colonial era are Dutch-influenced: they include selat solo (solo salad), bistik jawa (Javanese beef steak), semur (from Dutch smoor), sayur kacang merah (brenebon) and sop buntut. Cakes and cookies also can trace their origin to Dutch influences; such as kue bolu (tart), pandan cake, lapis legit (spekkoek), spiku (lapis Surabaya), klappertaart (coconut tart) and kaasstengels (cheese cookies). Kue cubit commonly found in front of schools and marketplaces are believed to be derived from poffertjes.

=== Architecture ===
The 16th- and 17th-century arrivals of European powers in Indonesia introduced masonry construction to Indonesia where previously timber and its by-products had been almost exclusively used. In the 17th and 18th centuries, Batavia was a fortified brick and masonry city. For almost two centuries, the colonialists did little to adapt their European architectural habits to the tropical climate. They built row houses which were poorly ventilated with small windows, which was thought as protection against tropical diseases coming from tropical air. Years later the Dutch had learnt to adapt their architectural styles with local building features (long eaves, verandahs, porticos, large windows and ventilation openings), and the 18th-century Dutch Indies country houses was one of the first colonial buildings to incorporate Indonesian architectural elements and adapt to the climate, then known as Indies Style.

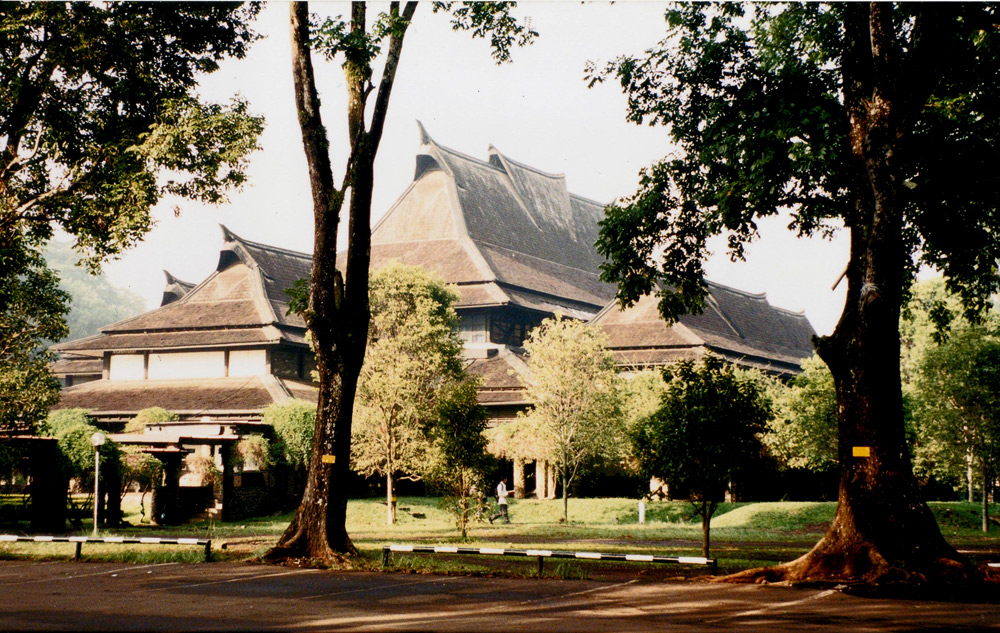
Ceremonial Hall, Bandung Institute of Technology, Bandung, designed by architect Henri Maclaine-Pont

From the end of the 19th century, significant improvements to technology, communications and transportation brought new wealth to Java. Modernistic buildings, including train stations, business hotels, factories and office blocks, hospitals and education institutions, were influenced by international styles. The early-20th-century trend was for modernist influences—such as art-deco—being expressed in essentially European buildings with Indonesian trim. Practical responses to the environment carried over from the earlier Indies Style, included overhanging eaves, larger windows and ventilation in the walls, which gave birth to the New Indies Style. The largest stock of colonial era buildings are in the large cities of Java, such as Bandung, Jakarta, Semarang, and Surabaya. Notable architects and planners include Albert Aalbers, Thomas Karsten, Henri Maclaine Pont, J. Gerber and C. P. W. Schoemaker. In the first three decades of the 20th century, the Department of Public Works funded major public buildings and introduced a town planning program under which the main towns and cities in Java and Sumatra were rebuilt and extended.

A lack of development in the Great Depression, the turmoil of the Second World War and the Indonesia's independence struggle of the 1940s, and economic stagnation during the politically turbulent 1950s and 1960s meant that much colonial architecture has been preserved through to recent decades. Colonial homes were almost always the preserve of the wealthy Dutch, Indonesian and Chinese elites; however, the styles were often rich and creative combinations of two cultures, so much so that the homes remain sought after into the 21st century. Native architecture was influenced by the introduction of European styles, and Western elements remain an influence on Indonesia's contemporary built environment.

=== Fashion ===
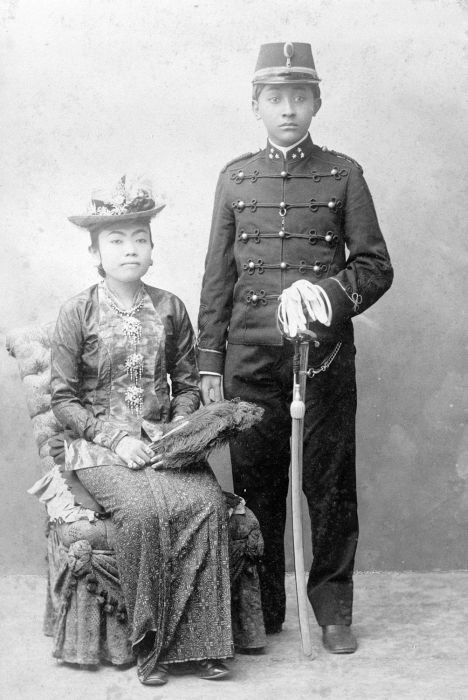
Javanese nobles adopted and mixed some aspects of European fashion, such as this couple in 1890.

Within the colony of the Dutch East Indies, fashion played an important role to define ones' status and social class. The European colonials wore European fashion straight out of the Netherlands, or even Paris, while the natives wore their traditional clothing that is distinct in every region. As the years progressed and Dutch influence became stronger, many natives began mixing European styles within their traditional clothing. High-ranking natives within the colony, as well as nobility, would wear European-style suits with their batik sarongs for special occasions and even for everyday use. Increasingly, native Indonesians began to dress more European. This came with the idea that those who wore European clothing were more progressive and open towards a European society and the etiquette that came with it. More and more the European influence was gaining precedence within native Indonesians. This probably stems from the fact that many natives were treated better if they wore European clothing. Their European counterparts acknowledged them, and that in turn was most likely a catalyst for adoption western clothing into traditional Indonesian clothing.

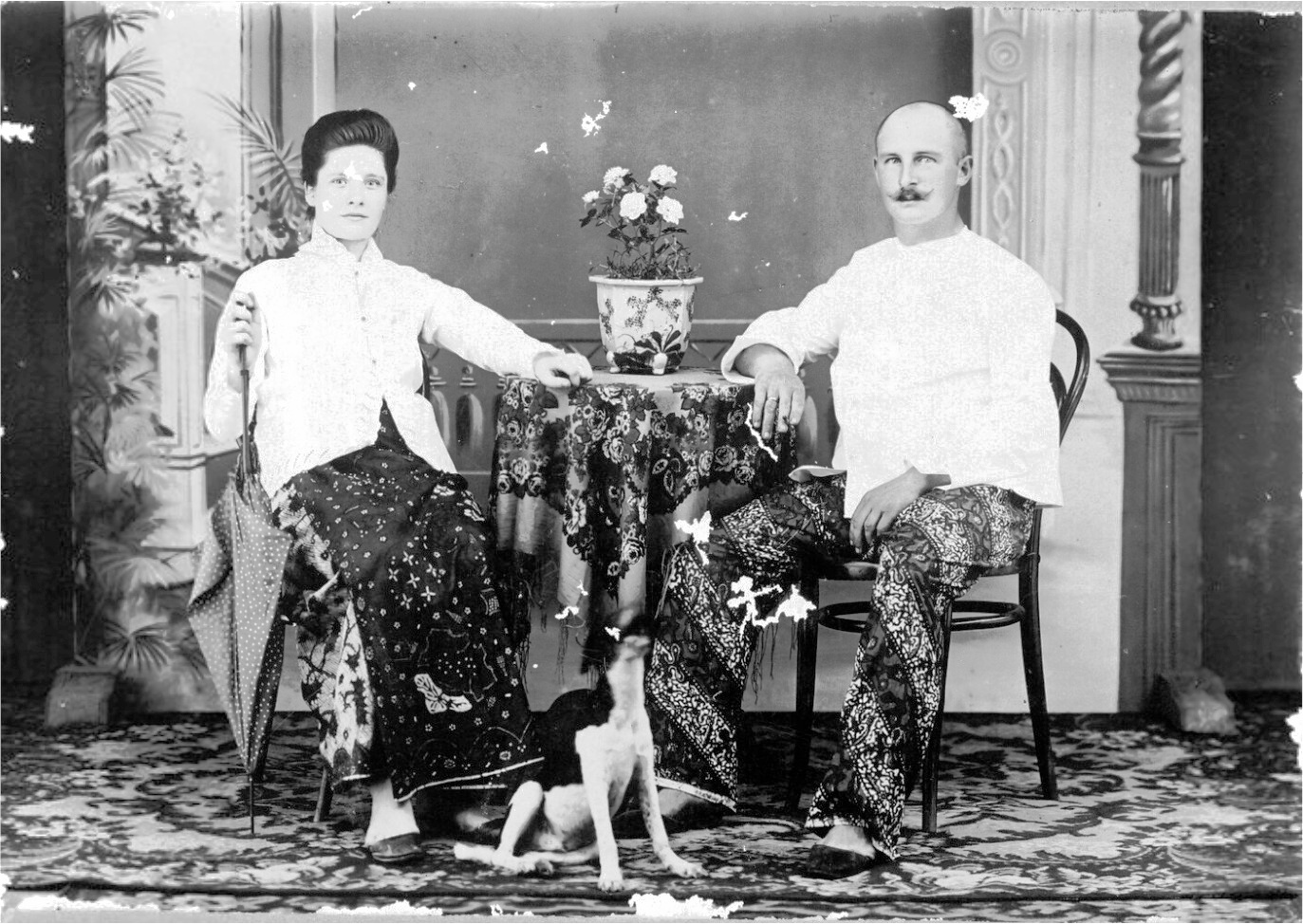
Dutch colonial couple in the early 20th century wearing native batik and kebaya fashion

The fashion influences between colonials and natives were a reciprocal phenomenon. Just as the Europeans influenced the natives, the natives too influenced the European colonials. For example, the thick European fabrics was considered too hot to wear in tropical climate. Thus, the light clothing of thin kebaya fabrics and the comfortable and easy to wear batik sarong were considered quite suitable for everyday clothing in hot and humid climate of the East Indies, though the Dutch typically wore European clothes for more formal occasions.

Later on in the history of the Dutch East Indies, as a new wave of Europeans were brought into the colony, many adopted Indonesian styles, and many even went so far as to wear traditional Javanese kebaya at home. Kebaya and batik sarong became increasingly popular among the resident Dutch over time, though the Dutch distinguished their own with expensive fabrics and European patterns. Batik was also a big influence for the Dutch. The technique was so fascinating to them that they brought it to their colonies in Africa where it was adopted with African patterns.

=== Sports ===
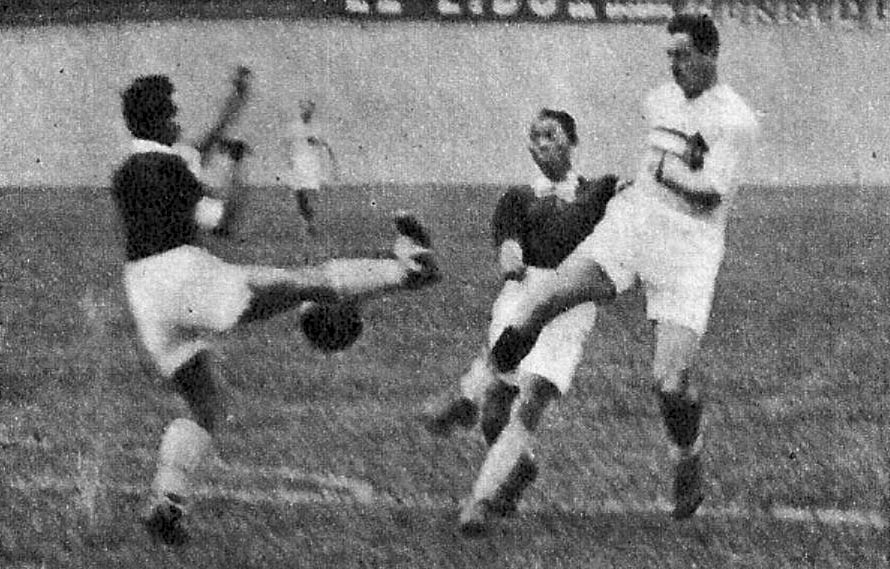
Dutch East Indies and Hungarian players during the 1938 World Cup

Football experienced significant growth in the Dutch East Indies starting in the last decade of the 19th century, with the emergence of the first football clubs on Java. The existence of city championships was initially documented in the early 1900s, coinciding with the establishment of local and regional football federations. However, many of these federations were short-lived, often dissolving shortly after their formation.

Notably, the Dutch East Indies national football team participated in the 1938 World Cup in France, making them the first Asian country to participate in a FIFA World Cup. However, their journey was cut short in the first round, as they suffered a 0–6 defeat against the Hungary national football team at Vélodrome Municipal Stadium, Reims, France.

== Colonial heritage in the Netherlands ==
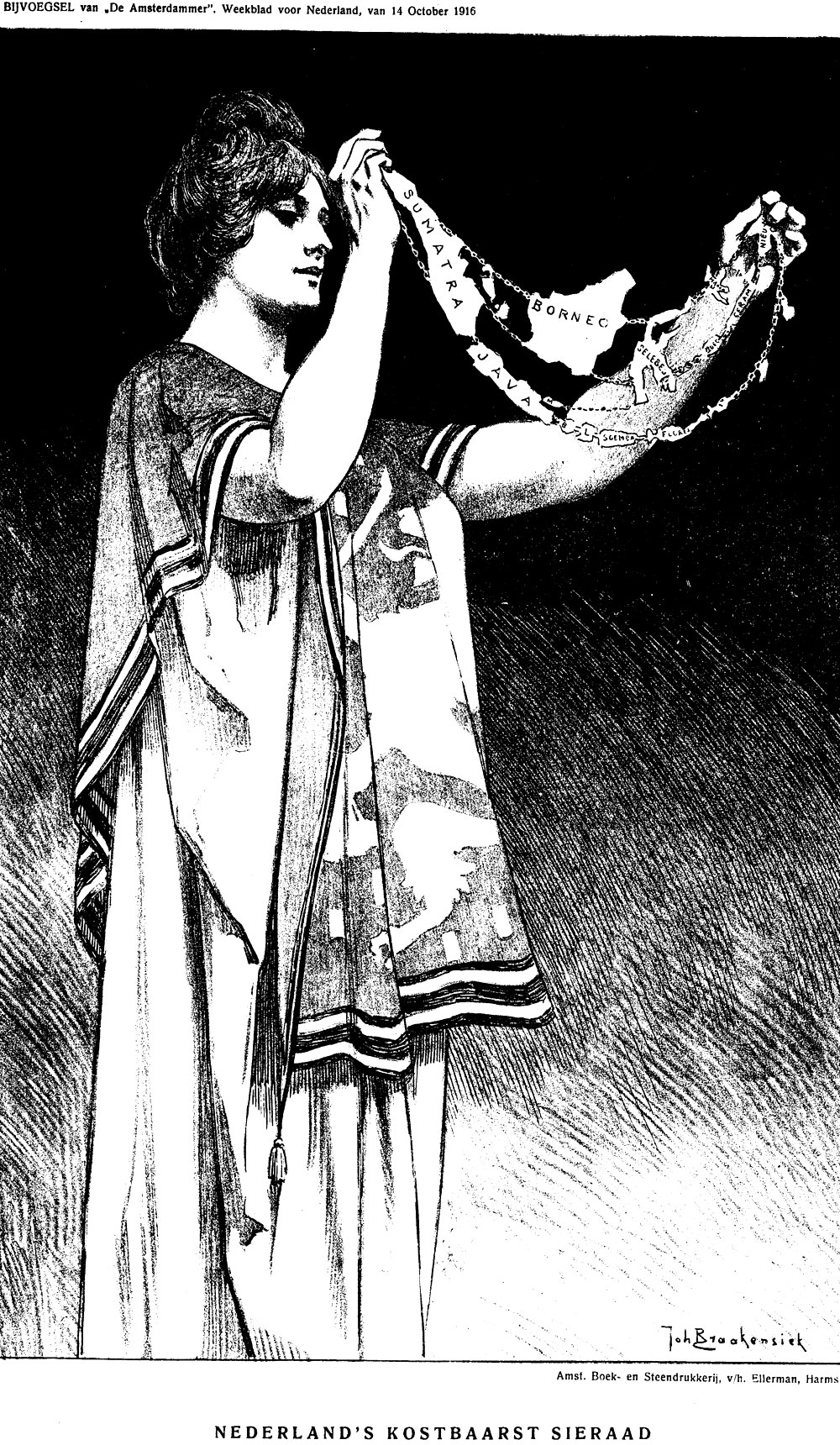
Dutch imperial imagery representing the Dutch East Indies (1916). The text reads "Netherlands' most precious jewel."

When the Dutch royal family was established in 1815, much of its wealth came from colonial trade.

Universities such as the Royal Leiden University founded in the 16th century have developed into leading knowledge centres about Southeast Asian and Indonesian studies. (Note: Some of the university faculties still include: Indonesian Languages and Cultures; Southeast Asia and Oceania Languages and Cultures; Cultural Anthropology.) Leiden University has produced academics such as Colonial adviser Christiaan Snouck Hurgronje who specialised in native oriental (Indonesian) affairs, and it still has academics who specialise in Indonesian languages and cultures. Leiden University and in particular KITLV are educational and scientific institutions that to this day share both an intellectual and historical interest in Indonesian studies. Other scientific institutions in the Netherlands include the Amsterdam Tropenmuseum, an anthropological museum with massive collections of Indonesian art, culture, ethnography and anthropology.

The traditions of the KNIL are maintained by the Regiment Van Heutsz of the modern Royal Netherlands Army and the dedicated Bronbeek Museum, a former home for retired KNIL soldiers, exists in Arnhem to this day.

Dutch newsreel dated 1927 showing a Dutch East Indian fair in the Netherlands featuring Indo and Indigenous people from the Dutch East Indies performing traditional dance and music in traditional attire (Note: Note: 1927 garden party, at the country estate Arendsdorp on the Wassenaarse weg near The Hague, for the benefit of the victims of the storm disaster of 2 June 1927 in the Netherlands. The market is opened by the minister of Colonies dr. J.C. Koningsberger.)

Many surviving colonial families and their descendants who moved back to the Netherlands after independence tended to look back on the colonial era with a sense of the power and prestige they had in the colony, with such items as the 1970s book Tempo Doeloe (Old times) by author Rob Nieuwenhuys, and other books and materials that became quite common in the 1970s and 1980s. Moreover, since the 18th century Dutch literature has a large number of established authors, such as Louis Couperus, the writer of "The Hidden Force", taking the colonial era as an important source of inspiration. In fact, one of the great masterpieces of Dutch literature is the book "Max Havelaar", written by Multatuli in 1860 as criticism of exploitative Dutch policies in Java.

The majority of Dutchmen that repatriated to the Netherlands after and during the Indonesian revolution are Indo (Eurasian), native to the islands of the Dutch East Indies. This relatively large Eurasian population had developed over a period of 400 years and were classified by colonial law as belonging to the European legal community. In Dutch they are referred to as Indo (short for Indo-European). Of the 296,200 so-called Dutch 'repatriants' only 92,200 were expatriate Dutchmen born in the Netherlands.

Including their second-generation descendants, they are currently the largest foreign born group in the Netherlands. In 2008, the Dutch Census Bureau for Statistics (CBS) registered 387,000 first- and second-generation Indos living in the Netherlands. Although considered fully assimilated into Dutch society, as the main ethnic minority in the Netherlands, these 'Repatriants' have played a pivotal role in introducing elements of Indonesian culture into Dutch mainstream culture. Practically every town in the Netherlands has a 'Toko' (Dutch Indonesian Shop) or Indonesian restaurant and many 'Pasar Malam' (night market in Malay/Indonesian) fairs are organised throughout the year.

Many Indonesian dishes and foodstuffs have become commonplace in the Dutch cuisine. Rijsttafel, a colonial culinary concept, and dishes such as nasi goreng and sate are still very popular in the Netherlands.

== See also ==
- Dutch colonial empire
- Freemasonry in the Dutch East Indies
- Postage stamps and postal history of the Dutch East Indies
- The Portuguese in Indonesia
- Netherlands Indies guilder
