= Penalty =

Penalty, The Penalty, Penalization, Penalisation, Penalize or Penalise may refer to:

== Sports ==
- Foul (sports)
  - Penalty (golf)
  - Penalty (gridiron football)
  - Penalty (ice hockey)
  - Penalty (rugby)
  - Penalty (rugby union)
  - Penalty kick (association football)
    - Penalty shoot-out (association football)
- Penalty (brand)

== Entertainment ==
- The Penalty (1920 film), an American crime film starring Lon Chaney
- The Penalty (1941 film), an American crime film
- Penalty (2019 film), an Indian sports film
- The Penalty (novel), a 2006 sports novel for children by Mal Peet

== Other uses ==
- Penalty (Mormonism), an oath made during the original Nauvoo Endowment ceremony of the Latter Day Saint movement
- Penalty (contract), a type of contractual clause
- Penalty Records, a record label
- Sentence (law)

== See also ==
- Panelization
