= Jakarta–Merak Toll Road =

Toll road in Indonesia

- Jalan Tol Jakarta–Merak
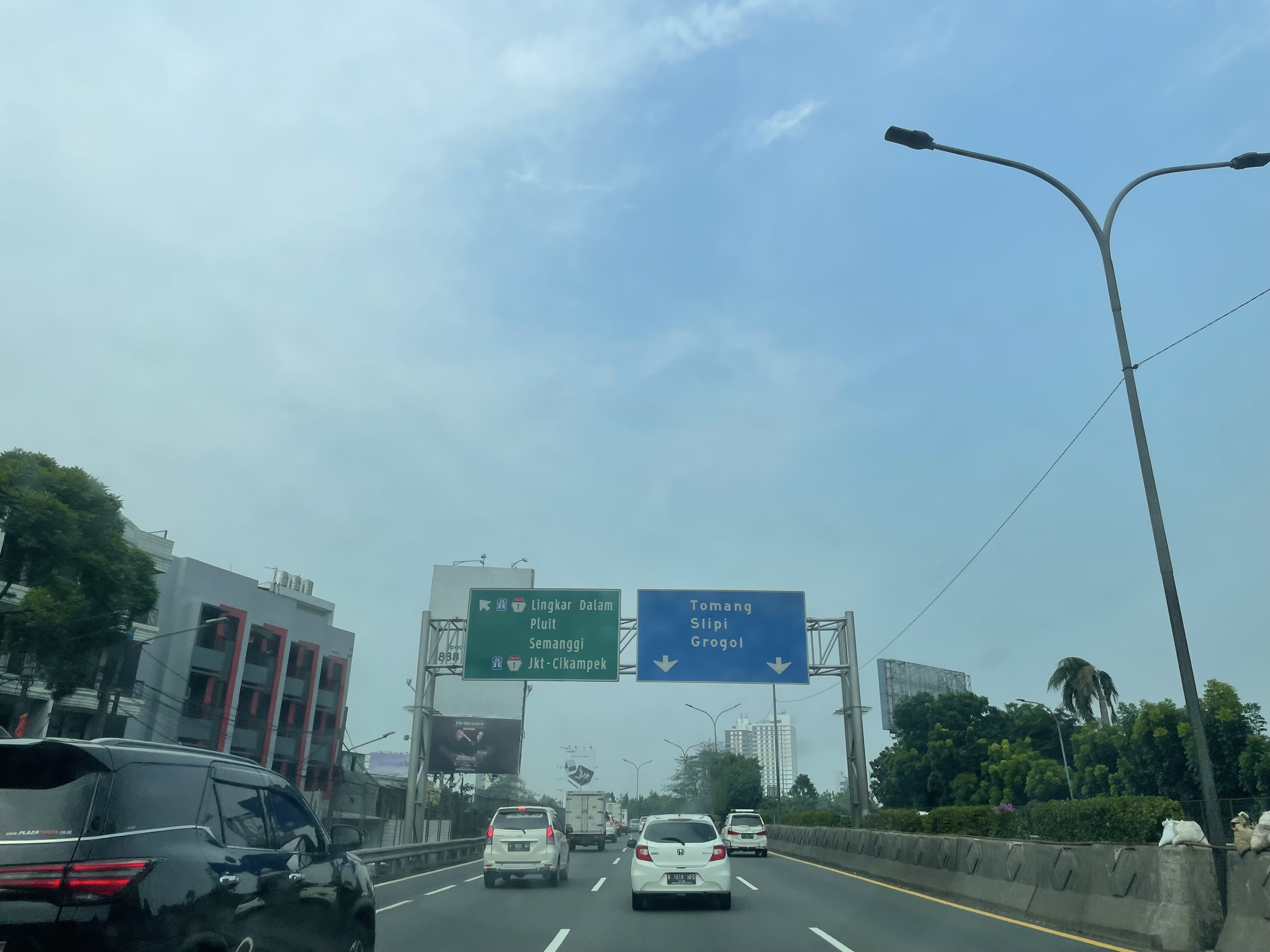
- Eastbound Jakarta–Merak Toll Road heading to Jakarta in 2022

Route information
- Part of AH2
- Maintained by: Jakarta–Tangerang: Jasa Marga; Tangerang–Merak: PT Marga Mandalasakti (Astra Tol Nusantara)
- Length: 98 km (61 mi)
- Existed: 1984–present
- History: 1984 (Jakarta-Tangerang section completed); 1992 (Tangerang-Merak section completed)

Major junctions
- East end: Tomang
- AH2 – Jakarta Inner Ring Road; Jakarta Outer Ring Road; Cengkareng–Batu Ceper–Kunciran Toll Road/Kunciran–Serpong Toll Road (Jakarta Outer Ring Road 2); Serpong–Balaraja Toll Road; Serang–Panimbang Toll Road
- West end: Port of Merak

Location
- Country: Indonesia
- Provinces: Special Capital Region of Jakarta, Banten
- Major cities: West Jakarta, Tangerang, Tangerang Regency, Serang Regency, Serang, Cilegon

Highway system
- Transport in Indonesia

The Jakarta–Merak Toll Road is a toll road connecting Jakarta and the Port of Merak (the westernmost point of Java) in Cilegon, Banten, Indonesia. Having a total length of 98 kilometres (61 mi), this toll road is a part of the Trans-Java Toll Road and divided into 2 sections: the 26 kilometres (16 mi) long Jakarta–Tangerang Toll Road (operated by Jasa Marga) and the 72 kilometres (45 mi) long Tangerang–Merak Toll Road (operated by Marga Mandalasakti). It is generally used by people to travel back and forth between Sumatra (through ferry via the Sunda Strait) and the cities of Java. This toll road is also a part of Asian Highway 2.

== History ==
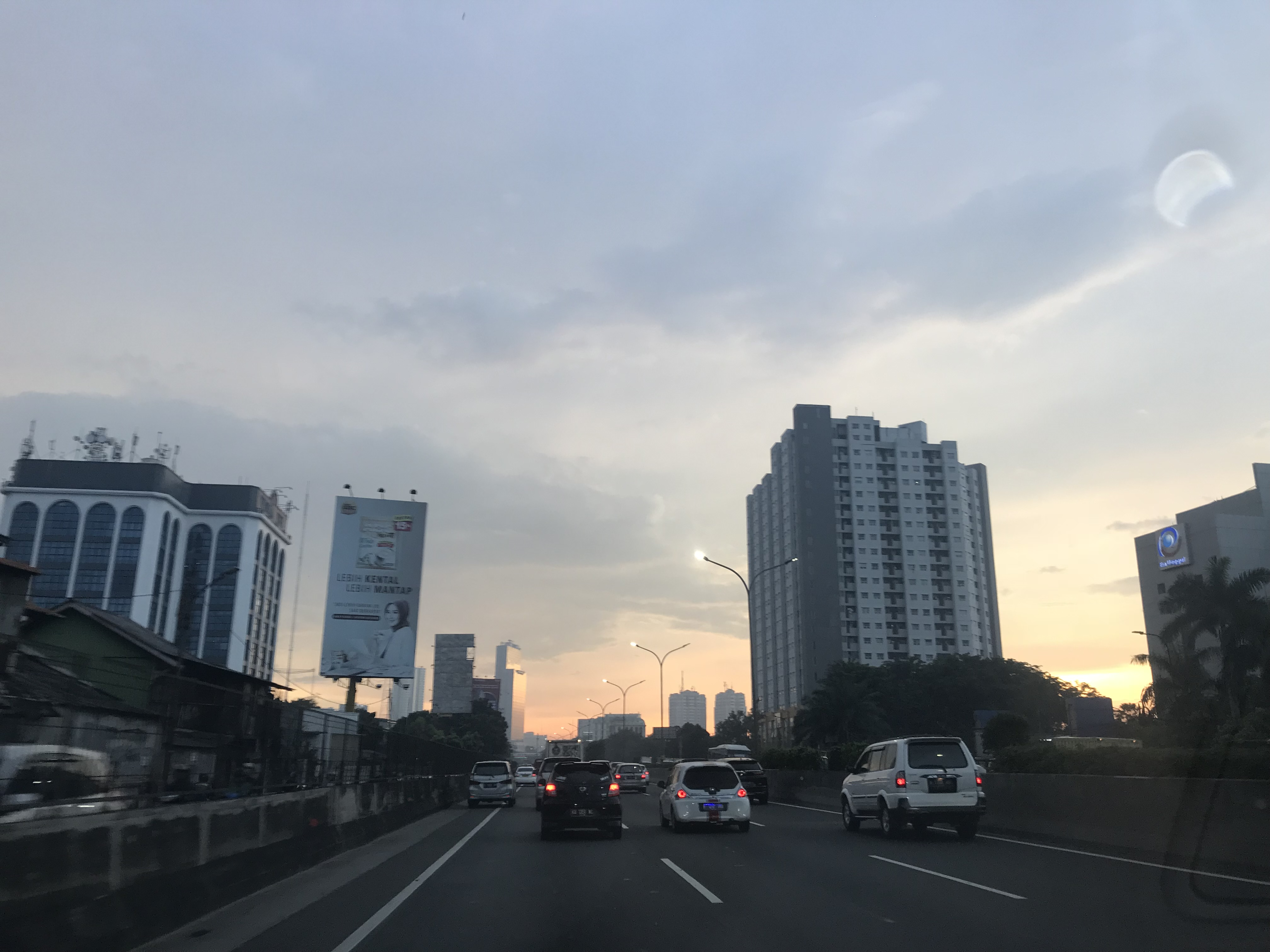
Westbound Jakarta–Merak Toll Road heading to Merak in 2018

The Jakarta–Merak Toll Road is the second toll road to be opened in Indonesia after the Jagorawi Toll Road in 1978. The first westbound exit is located at Kebon Jeruk. It also has exits in Tangerang, Balaraja, Cikande, Ciujung, Serang, Pandeglang and Cilegon, before ending at Merak.

On 9 April 2017, the Karang Tengah toll gate was abolished due to constant traffic congestions around the vicinity.

== Exit lists ==
Legend:

- I/C - Interchange, I/S - Intersection, RSA - Rest and service area, OBR - Overhead bridge restaurant, R/R - Restaurant and rest plaza, L/B - Layby, V/P - Vista point, TN - tunnel, T/P - Toll plaza, BR - Bridge
- C - Cloverleaf, S - Stack, T-A - Trumpet-A, T-B - Trumpet-B, DT - Directional-T/Y, SDT - Semi-Directional-T/Y, P-Y - Partial-Y, D - Diamond, P-C - Partial cloverleaf, D-D - Diverging diamond, D-R - Direct ramp

Province	Regency	Location	km	mi	Exit	Name	Destinations	Notes
Jakarta	West Jakarta	Palmerah	0	0.0	0	Tomang Interchange	Jakarta Inner Ring Road – Soekarno-Hatta International Airport, Tanjung Priok, Pluit, Semanggi, Cawang, Cikampek	Western terminus, Start of Toll Route 7
Jakarta	West Jakarta	Grogol Petamburan	0	0.0	Tomang Toll Gate (Eastbound tolls only)			
Jakarta	West Jakarta	Palmerah	0	0.0	0	Tomang Ramp	Tomang, Slipi, Grogol	
Jakarta	West Jakarta	Kebon Jeruk	3.29	2.04	3	Kebon Jeruk Toll Gate	Kebon Jeruk, South Kedoya	
Jakarta	West Jakarta	Kembangan	5.93	3.68	6	Meruya Toll Gate	Meruya, Kembangan, Joglo	Westbound exit, eastbound entry only
Jakarta	West Jakarta	Kembangan	7.30	4.54	7	Meruya Interchange	Jakarta Outer Ring Road – Rawa Buaya, Soekarno-Hatta International Airport, Meruya, Joglo; Jakarta–Serpong Toll Road	
Banten	Tangerang	Karangtengah	9.51	5.91	11	Karang Tengah Barat Toll Gate	Karangtengah, Ciledug, Cipondoh	
Banten	Tangerang	Pinang	15.23	9.46	15	Kunciran Interchange	Jakarta Outer Ring Road 2 Cengkareng–Batu Ceper–Kunciran Toll Road – Buaran Indah, Soekarno-Hatta International Airport; Kunciran–Serpong Toll Road – Bintaro, Serpong	
Banten	Tangerang	Pinang	15.23	9.46	15	Kunciran Toll Gate	Kunciran, Alam Sutera, Serpong	Westbound exit & Eastbound entry only
Banten	Tangerang	Pinang	18.51	11.50	18	Tangerang Toll Gate	Tangerang, Serpong, Pakulonan	
Banten	Tangerang	Cibodas	20.95	13.02	21	Karawaci Toll Gate	Karawaci, Binong, Legok	
Banten	Tangerang	Kelapa Dua	20.95	13.02	21	Karawaci Toll Gate	Karawaci, Binong, Legok	
Banten	Tangerang	Curug	26.50	16.47	26	Bitung Toll Gate	Bitung, Curug	
Banten	Tangerang	Cikupa	31.63	19.65	31	Cikupa Toll Gate	Cikupa, Pasarkemis	
Banten	Tangerang	Cikupa	31.63	19.65	Cikupa Toll Gate (Main toll gate/Border between Jakarta-Tangerang and Tangerang-Merak)			
Banten	Tangerang	Cikupa	35.78	22.23	35	Balaraja Timur Toll Gate	Balaraja, Tigaraksa, Cikupa	
Banten	Tangerang	Balaraja	39.11	24.30	39	Balaraja Barat Toll Gate	Balaraja, Tigaraksa	
Banten	Serang	Cikande	52.33	32.52	52	Cikande Toll Gate	Cikande, Industrial Area	
Banten	Serang	Kragilan	59.95	37.25	60	Ciujung Toll Gate	Ciujung, Kragilan	
Banten	Serang	Walantaka	64.10	39.83	64	Walantaka Interchange	Serang–Panimbang Toll Road – Rangkasbitung, Pandeglang, Tanjung Lesung	
Banten	Serang	Cipocok Jaya	72.21	44.87	72	Serang Timur Toll Gate	Serang, Banten Lama, Pandeglang	
Banten	Serang	Taktakan, Serang	77.62	48.23	77	Serang Barat Toll Gate	Serang, Kramatwatu	
Banten	Serang	Kramatwatu	87.36	54.28	87	Cilegon Timur Toll Gate	Cilegon, Bojonegara, Kramatwatu	
Banten	Cilegon	Purwakarta	95.19	59.15	95	Cilegon Barat Toll Gate	Cilegon, Anyer, Krakatau Steel, Carita	Westbound exit, eastbound entry only
Banten	Cilegon	Gerogol	98.48	61.19	Merak Toll Gate			
Banten	Cilegon	Gerogol	98.62	61.28	98	Merak Ramp	Port of Merak	Westernmost toll gate/exit in Java, Western terminus of Toll Route 1
1.000 mi = 1.609 km; 1.000 km = 0.621 mi: Concurrency terminus; Electronic toll collection; Incomplete access; Route transition
