= Jakarta–Tangerang Toll Road =

Toll road in Indonesia

- Jalan Tol Jakarta–Tangerang
- Janger Toll Road
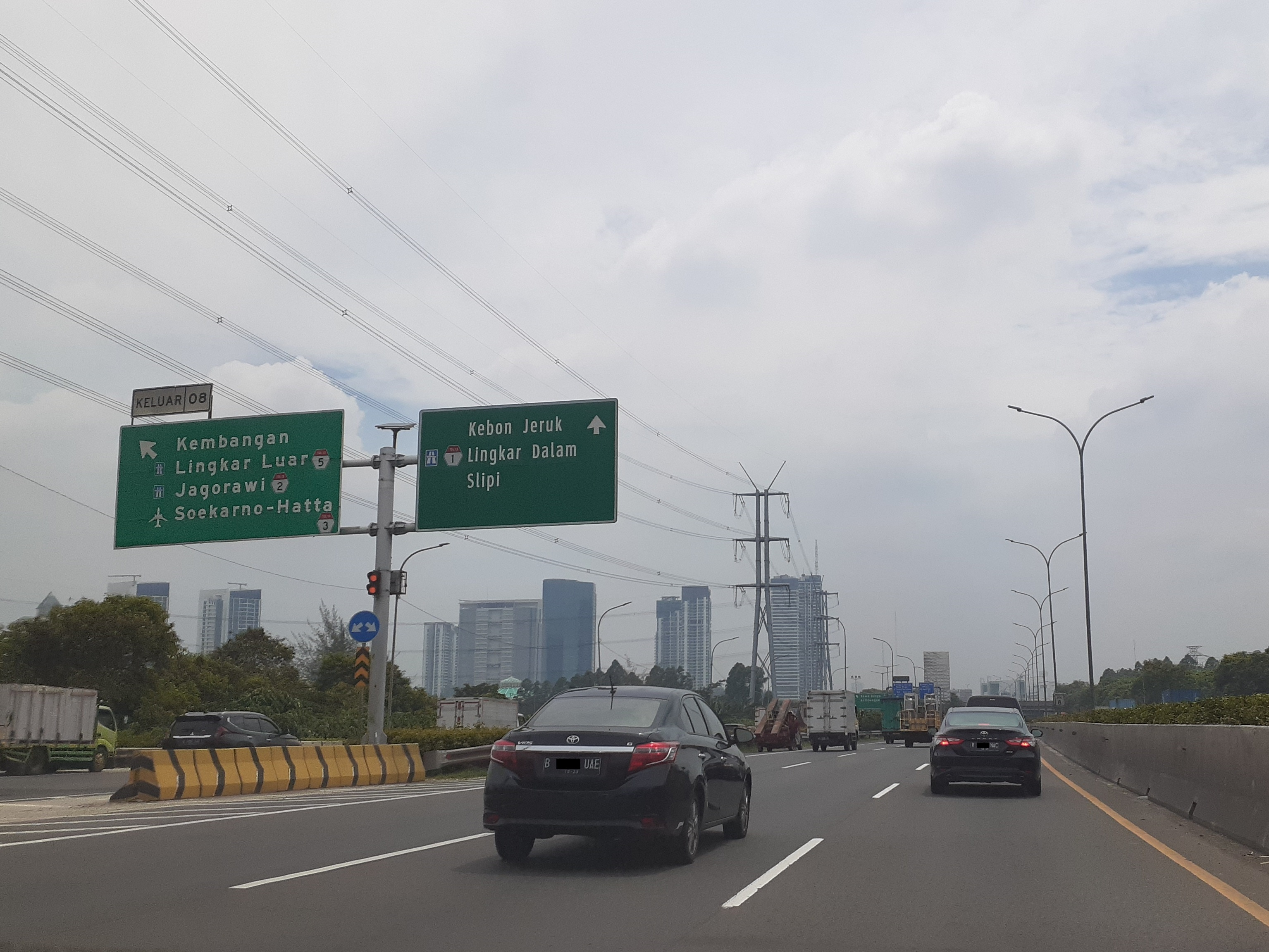
- Eastbound Jakarta–Tangerang Toll Road heading to Jakarta in 2021

Route information
- Part of AH2
- Maintained by Jasa Marga
- Length: 26 km (16 mi)
- Existed: 1984–present

Major junctions
- East end: Tomang
- AH2 – Jakarta Inner Ring Road; Jakarta Outer Ring Road; Cengkareng–Batu Ceper–Kunciran Toll Road/Kunciran–Serpong Toll Road (Jakarta Outer Ring Road 2); AH2 – Tangerang–Merak Toll Road
- West end: Bitung

Location
- Country: Indonesia
- Major cities: West Jakarta, Tangerang City, Tangerang Regency

Highway system
- Transport in Indonesia

The Jakarta–Tangerang Toll Road (shortened to Janger Toll Road) is a controlled-access toll road connecting Jakarta with Tangerang in the province of Banten, Indonesia. Being a part of the Jakarta–Merak Toll Road, it was opened on 27 November 1984. It is the main road for residents who live in the western Jakarta area.

== Exits ==
Province/Region	Regency	Location	km	mi	Exit	Name	Destinations	Notes
Jakarta	West Jakarta	Grogol Petamburan	0	0.0	0	Tomang Interchange	Jakarta Inner Ring Road – Soekarno-Hatta International Airport, Tanjung Priok, Pluit, Semanggi, Cawang, Cikampek	Western terminus, Start of Toll Route 7
Jakarta	West Jakarta	Grogol Petamburan	0	0.0	Tomang Toll Gate (westbound tolls only)			
Jakarta	West Jakarta	Grogol Petamburan	0	0.0	0	Tomang Ramp	Tomang, Slipi, Grogol	
Jakarta	West Jakarta	Kebon Jeruk	3.29	2.04	3	Kebon Jeruk Toll Gate	Kebon Jeruk, Kedoya	
Jakarta	West Jakarta	Kembangan	5.93	3.68	6	Meruya Toll Gate	Meruya, Kembangan, Joglo	Westbound exit, eastbound entry only
Jakarta	West Jakarta	Kembangan	7.30	4.54	7	Meruya Interchange	Jakarta Outer Ring Road – Soekarno-Hatta International Airport, Rawa Buaya, Kalideres, Meruya, Joglo, Ciledug	
Banten	Tangerang	Karang Tengah	9.51	5.91	11	Karang Tengah Barat Toll Gate	Karang Tengah, Ciledug, Cipondoh	
Banten	Tangerang	Pinang	15.23	9.46	15	Kunciran Interchange	Jakarta Outer Ring Road 2 – Soekarno-Hatta International Airport, Pinang, Cipondoh, Kunciran, Bintaro, Serpong	
Banten	Tangerang	Pinang	15.23	9.46	15	Kunciran Toll Gate	Kunciran, Alam Sutera, Serpong	Westbound exit, eastbound entry only
Banten	Tangerang	Pinang	18.51	11.50	18	Tangerang Toll Gate	Tangerang, Pakulonan, Serpong	
Banten	Tangerang	Kelapa Dua	20.95	13.02	21	Karawaci Toll Gate	Karawaci, Binong, Legok	
Banten	Tangerang	Curug	26.50	16.47	26	Bitung Toll Gate	Bitung, Curug, Budiarto Airport	
Banten	Tangerang	Cikupa	31.63	19.65	Cikupa Toll Gate (Main toll gate/Border between Jakarta-Tangerang and Tangerang-Merak)			
1.000 mi = 1.609 km; 1.000 km = 0.621 mi: Electronic toll collection; Incomplete access; Route transition

== See also ==
- Transport in Indonesia
