= North Serpong =

North Serpong Serpong Utara
- District
- Interactive map of North Serpong
- Coordinates: 6°15′20″S 106°39′50″E
- Country: Indonesia
- Province: Banten
- City: South Tangerang

Area
  - Total: 22.36 km^{2} (8.63 sq mi)

Population (mid 2023 estimate)
  - Total: 138,209
  - Density: 6,181/km^{2} (16,010/sq mi)

North Serpong (Indonesian: Serpong Utara) is an administrative district (kecamatan) within the city of South Tangerang, in Banten Province on Java, Indonesia. The district covers an area of 22.36 km^{2} and had a population of 126,499 at the 2010 Census and 134,008 at the 2020 Census; the official estimate as of mid-2023 was 138,209.

== History ==
North Serpong was previously part of Serpong district before it was split off from the northern part of the district in 2007.

== Communities ==
North Serpong District is sub-divided into seven urban communities (kelurahan), listed below with their areas and their officially-estimated populations as of mid-2022, together with their postcodes.

Kode Wilayah	Name of kelurahan	Area in km^{2}	Population mid 2022 estimate	Post code
36.74.02.1001	Pakulonan	2.79	13,128	15325
36.74.02.1002	Pakualam	2.81	15,600	15320
36.74.02.1003	Pakujaya	4.54	27,196	15324
36.74.02.1004	Pondok Jagung	2.09	20,241	15326
36.74.02.1005	Pondok Jagung Timur	2.25	18,964	15326
36.74.02.1006	Jelupang	1.26	32,803	15323
36.74.02.1007	Lengkong Karya	2.10	7,992	15320
36.74.02	Totals	17.84	135,924 ^{(a)}	

Notes: (a) comprising 67,875 males and 68,049 females.

== Residential ==
North Serpong, a district in South Tangerang, Banten, Indonesia, is home to several planned residential areas known for their strategic locations, modern facilities, and well-organized layouts. These neighborhoods serve as key hubs for residential and commercial activities, providing a balanced mix of urban living and green spaces.

=== Alam Sutera ===
Established in 1994, Alam Sutera is a pioneering integrated development in North Serpong. Spanning residential, commercial, and recreational zones, it is known for its sustainability-focused urban planning. Key features include well-maintained parks, international schools, shopping centers, and office complexes. Landmarks within Alam Sutera include Alam Sutera Mall, Flavor Bliss, and the BINUS University Alam Sutera Campus. This area mostly caters to middle- to upper-class residents and businesses. Alam Sutera Is Strategic 2 Acesss Toll Road In Jakarta-Merak Toll Road And Jakarta Outer Ring Road 2. In The Future Alam Sutera Will Have Jakarta MRT Phase 3 From Cikarang In West Java To Balaraja In Banten

=== Bintaro Jaya ===
Bintaro Jaya established in 1979 Bintaro Jaya is a large residential area designed with modern amenities and infrastructure. It is strategically located near toll roads and offers various housing options for middle- to upper-class residents. The area also includes community centers, schools, and commercial establishments. This area also includes Pondok Aren and Ciputat and become one of the largest suburb in Greater Jakarta area.

=== Villa Melati Mas ===
Villa Melati Mas is a residential neighborhood offering a peaceful living environment. It features family-oriented facilities such as playgrounds, sports areas, and 24-hour security, making it an attractive option for families seeking tranquility in an urban setting.

=== Royal Serpong Village ===
Royal Serpong Village is a gated community known for its affordable housing and proximity to key business districts. This neighborhood provides essential facilities such as parks and recreational areas, catering to the needs of young professionals and growing families.

=== Melati Mas Regency ===
Melati Mas Regency is one of the most established residential complexes in North Serpong. It is renowned for its wide roads, green landscapes, and comprehensive facilities. Residents benefit from nearby schools, shopping complexes, and easy access to major transportation routes.

== Public Transportations ==
North Serpong, located in South Tangerang, Banten, offers a variety of public transportation options, catering to the needs of its growing population. These services include operational routes as well as planned developments aimed at enhancing regional connectivity.

=== Transjakarta S11 (Terminal BSD–Jelambar) ===
The Transjakarta S11 corridor connects Terminal BSD in South Tangerang to Jelambar in West Jakarta. This service provides an efficient and affordable transportation option for commuters traveling between the residential areas of Serpong and the bustling urban centers of Jakarta.

=== Jakarta MRT Phase 3 (Planned) ===
As part of the East-West Jakarta MRT line, the planned Phase 3 will span from Cikarang in West Java to Balaraja in Banten. In North Serpong, this project is expected to include nearby stations such as Kebon Nanas and Panunggangan, located in Pinang, Tangerang City. This development is anticipated to significantly reduce travel times and improve access to Jakarta's core business districts.

=== Glad Bus (Shuttle Bus Service) ===
The Glad Bus is a private shuttle service catering to residents of Klub Keluarga Graha Raya. It provides convenient transport to the Fatmawati MRT Station, facilitating seamless access to Jakarta’s MRT North-South line for daily commuters.

=== Shuttle Bus Bintaro Jaya ===
The Bintaro Jaya Shuttle Bus connects Klub Keluarga Graha Raya to Bintaro Jaya Xchange, a major lifestyle and commercial hub in South Tangerang. This service is popular among residents for its reliability and comfort.

=== Future Impact ===
With these current and planned transportation options, North Serpong is positioned to become a more accessible and connected area. The integration of MRT systems with existing services will reduce traffic congestion, improve mobility, and enhance the quality of life for residents and visitors.
