= BSD City =

Planned township in Greater Jakarta, Indonesia

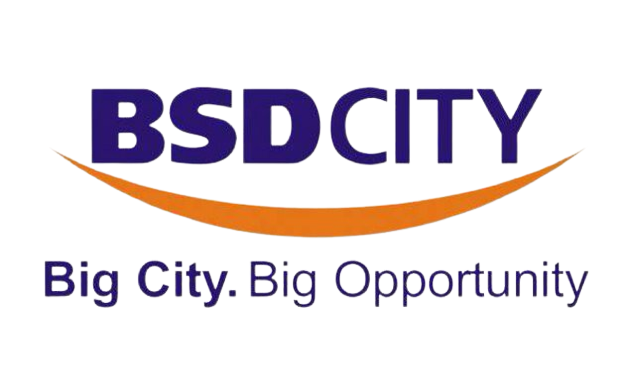
- Interactive map of BSD City
- Other name: Bumi Serpong Damai (former name)
- Location: Serpong, South Tangerang and Tangerang Regency, Banten, Indonesia
- Coordinates: 6°18′02″S 106°39′8″E
- Status: Completed, expansion underway
- Opening: 1989
- Website: bsdcity.com

Companies
- Owner: Sinar Mas Land
- Manager: PT Bumi Serpong Damai Tbk

Technical details
- Buildings: ±40,000 residential units (claimed)
- Size: 6,000 ha (total); 3,500 ha (2021, actual use)

BSD City, formerly referred to Bumi Serpong Damai is a planned community located within Greater Jakarta in Indonesia. The project was initiated in 1984 by a group of private developers and started in 1989. The town is currently managed by the holding company PT Bumi Serpong Damai Tbk, which is owned by Sinar Mas Land, a subsidiary of the Sinar Mas Group, a large industrial conglomerate in Indonesia. BSD City encompasses a total area of approximately 6,000 hectares, hosting a range of residential houses, apartments, malls, offices, and more. Most of the residential areas are designed to be suitable for Indonesia's upper-middle class, in gated neighbourhoods, each with different themes. The city is now a self-sustaining community, with businesses, schools, shopping malls, hospitals and hotels.

== History ==
In the 1980s, the Serpong district of South Tangerang was a largely uninhabited rubber plantation. At the time, infrastructure such as asphalted roads and electricity was yet to be built. In 1984, Ir. Ciputra planned to build an independent township in the district, to be named as Bumi Serpong Damai. The development of the township was backed by 11 private companies including Pembangunan Jaya, Sinar Mas, Salim Group, and Metropolitan Kentjana with a total of Rp 3.2 trillion investment. The inauguration was held on 16 January 1989, attended by the Minister of Home Affairs at the time, Rudini.

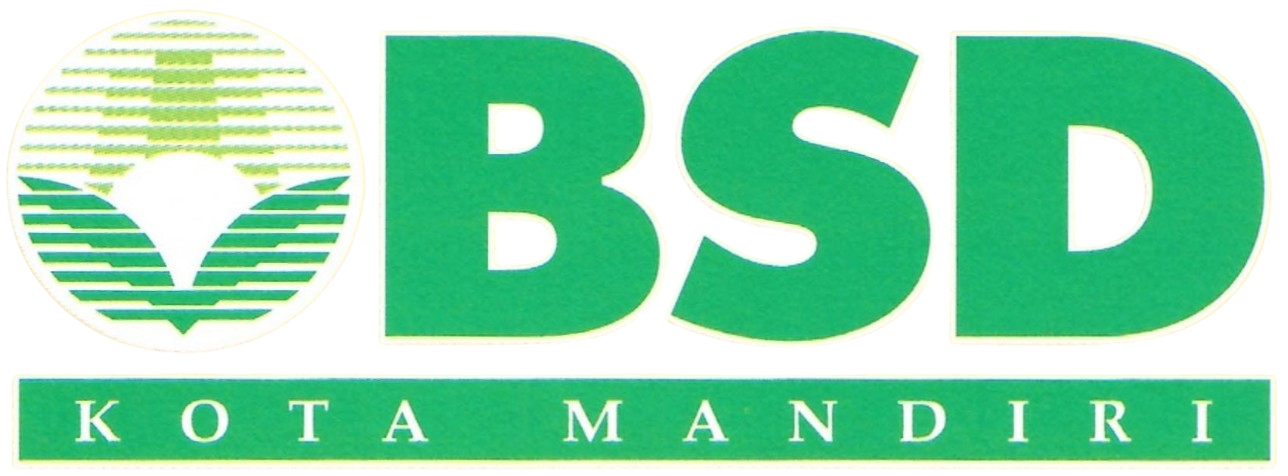
BSD City's old logo circa 1989‒2004

At the time of project development during the 1990s, BSD City was the most ambitious urban planning scheme in Indonesia to combine housing, business and commercial properties. It is designed to be a self-sustaining community, with various types of public facilities available to its residents. The township started growing, and as the Jakarta–Tangerang Toll Road opened, residents started coming in as it provides an easier access to the township.

During the 1997 Asian financial crisis, real estate business in Indonesia stagnated for around 5 years. Due to this, Bumi Serpong Damai changed ownership to Sinar Mas Land around 2003–2004. To change its brand image, Sinar Mas eventually changed the name of the township into its initials, becoming BSD City, and built new residential clusters with new names (De Latinos, The Icon, Sevilla, Foresta, etc.) to market it better. Sinar Mas continues to develop the township, expanding from the Serpong district into the Tangerang Regency, in which they plan to build the next phase of BSD City.

In recent years, BSD City continues to expand exponentially, with new apartment and housing complexes being built in collaboration with international property companies such as Hong Kong Land ('Nava Park') and Mitsubishi Corp ('The Zora'). Since then, many consider BSD City as an affluent or 'elite' district within the bustling metropolitan area of Jabodetabek. The extension of the Toll road to Balaraja and the direct connection to JORR 2 also increases the accessibility of the area.

== Area ==
BSD City currently owns land in:

- Tangerang Regency:
  - Cisauk
  - Pagedangan
- South Tangerang City:
  - Serpong
  - North Serpong

== Facilities and Landmarks ==
=== Schools and Universities ===
==== Schools ====
- Al-Azhar BSD
- Athalia BSD
- BINUS School Serpong
- Cikal Harapan School BSD
- Ehipassiko School BSD
- Genesis Global School
- German School Jakarta
- ILON Academy BSD
- IPEKA BSD
- Jakarta Nanyang School
- Ora et Labora BSD
- Sinarmas World Academy
- Stella Maris School BSD
- Sekolah Murid Merdeka BSD
- Saint John's Catholic School BSD
- Sampoerna Academy BSD
- Santa Ursula BSD
- SoliDEO BSD
- ACS Jakarta West Campus (under construction)
- Wellington College Independent School BSD (under construction)
- BPK Penabur BSD (planned)
- Singapore Intercultural School BSD (planned)

==== Universities ====
- Politeknik Enjiniring Pertanian Indonesia (PEPI)
- Monash University, Indonesia
- Sekolah Tinggi Agama Buddha Negeri Sriwijaya Tangerang
- Prasetiya Mulya University (Prasmul)
- Institut Teknologi Tangerang Selatan (ITTS)
- Universitas Bina Sarana Informatika, BSD campus
- UIC College BSD
- Unika Atma Jaya, BSD campus
- BINUS University (under construction)
- Calvin Institute of Technology BSD (planned)

=== Healthcare ===
- Eka Hospital BSD
- Columbia Asia Hospital BSD
- Proklamasi Hospital BSD
- Biomedical Campus D-Hub BSD
- Mitra Keluarga Hospital BSD (under construction)
- Primaya Hospital BSD (under construction)
- Medical Suites D-Hub BSD (under construction)

=== Parks and Public Spaces ===
- Botanical Park BSD City
- Taman Kota 1 BSD
- Taman Kota 2 BSD
- Taman Kota 3 BSD
- Einstein Park EduTown
- Sakura Park AEON Mall BSD
- Serbaraja Toll Park - The Breeze
- Green Pathway Eastvara-Terravia (under construction)

=== Convention Centers ===
- Indonesia Convention Exhibition
- BSD International Automotive Center (planned)

=== Offices ===
- BFI Tower
- BSD City Marketing Office
- EduCenter BSD
- Graha Artajasa
- Graha Telkom
- Graha Telkomsigma II
- Graha Unilever
- InnoPharm BSD
- My Republic Plaza
- One Tower (OCBC Office)
- Sinar Mas Land Plaza
- Smartfren BSD Office
- Sunburst Office Park
- Telkom Graha BSD
- Telkomsel Smart Office BSD
- Traveloka Campus
- Wisma BCA BSD
- Wisma BCA Foresta
- Wisma BNI
- Wisma BRI BSD

=== Showrooms and Dealerships ===
- Astra Biz Centre BSD
- Auto2000 BSD
- BYD Arista BSD
- Denza Arista BSD
- Mazda Dealership BSD
- Mercedes-Benz Dealership BSD
- MG Motor Dealership BSD
- Geely Dealership BSD
- Honda Dealership BSD
- Hyundai Dealership BSD
- Wuling Dealership BSD
- XPeng Dealership BSD

=== Retail ===
- Ararasa BSD
- ÆON Mall BSD City
- BSD Plaza
- BSD Junction
- Duta Buah Segar BSD
- Eastvara BSD
- Gramedia BSD
- ITC BSD
- Teraskota BSD
- Parade Fashion Outlet BSD
- Pasar Modern BSD
- BSD Spare Parts Center
- BSD Autoparts Automotive Center
- Intermoda BSD Modern Market
- The Barn
- The Breeze
- QBIG BSD City
- BSD Square (under renovation)
- Wander Alley Intermoda BSD (under construction)

=== Accommodation ===
==== Tourism ====
- BSD Xtreme Park
- OceanPark Water Adventure
- Quantis Clubhouse BSD
- Ice House Sportindo (under construction)
- BSD Secret Zoo (under construction)
- BSD Community Hub (planned)
- Cimory Dairyland BSD (planned)

==== Hospitality ====
- Hotel Santika BSD
- POP! Hotel BSD
- Grand Zuri BSD
- Trembesi Hotel BSD
- Swiss-Belhotel Serpong
- Santika Premiere Hotel BSD
- Mercure Hotel BSD
- Sapphire Sky Hotel BSD
- The Grantage Hotel & Sky Lounge
- Starlet Hotel BSD
- Ibis Styles BSD
- Novotel BSD
- Four Points Hotel BSD (planned)

== Transportation ==
=== Toll roads ===
BSD City is surrounded by several toll roads connecting the township to Jakarta and other satellite cities. The Jakarta–Serpong Toll Road, connecting Ulujami to Serpong, runs through the southern end of BSD City. There are two exits currently present, one to Jl. Letnan Sutopo and another to Jl. Kapten Soebijanto Djojohadikusumo. The planned extension of the toll road, Serpong–Balaraja Toll Road will also cross West BSD and link the city to Balaraja in Tangerang Regency and the first phase to Legok is currently operational. The Kunciran–Serpong Toll Road, part of the Jakarta Outer Ring Road 2, also links the township to Tangerang, Depok and other metropolitan areas in Greater Jakarta.

=== Public transport ===
Serpong, Rawa Buntu, Cisauk, and Jatake railway stations of KRL Commuterline is situated within and nearby the development, all serving the KRL Rangkasbitung Line. Transjakarta has a feeder route from BSD City to Jelambar in West Jakarta, namely route S11. There are free shuttle and school bus services within the development. There are also shuttle bus services that provides services to MRT's Fatmawati station.

BSD City Intermoda district connects transportation from within and outside the township through KRL Commuterline, and transportation within the BSD City itself with the free shuttle bus BSD Link that connects several important locations in BSD City.

In the future, BSD City will be served by the Jakarta MRT North-South Line extension from Lebak Bulus to Serpong. From Lebak Bulus in the east to Serpong in the west, this MRT is planned to pass through Bintaro Jaya and Promoter BSD. The Jakarta MRT is planned to connect with the Indonesia Convention Exhibition (ICE) BSD. This line will improve accessibility and public transportation connectivity in residential and regional areas.

== See also ==
- Tangerang Regency
- South Tangerang
- Greater Jakarta
- Sinar Mas Land
- SouthCity Indonesia
- Indonesia Convention Exhibition
