= Kunciran–Serpong Toll Road =

Toll Road in Indonesia

- Kunser Toll Road
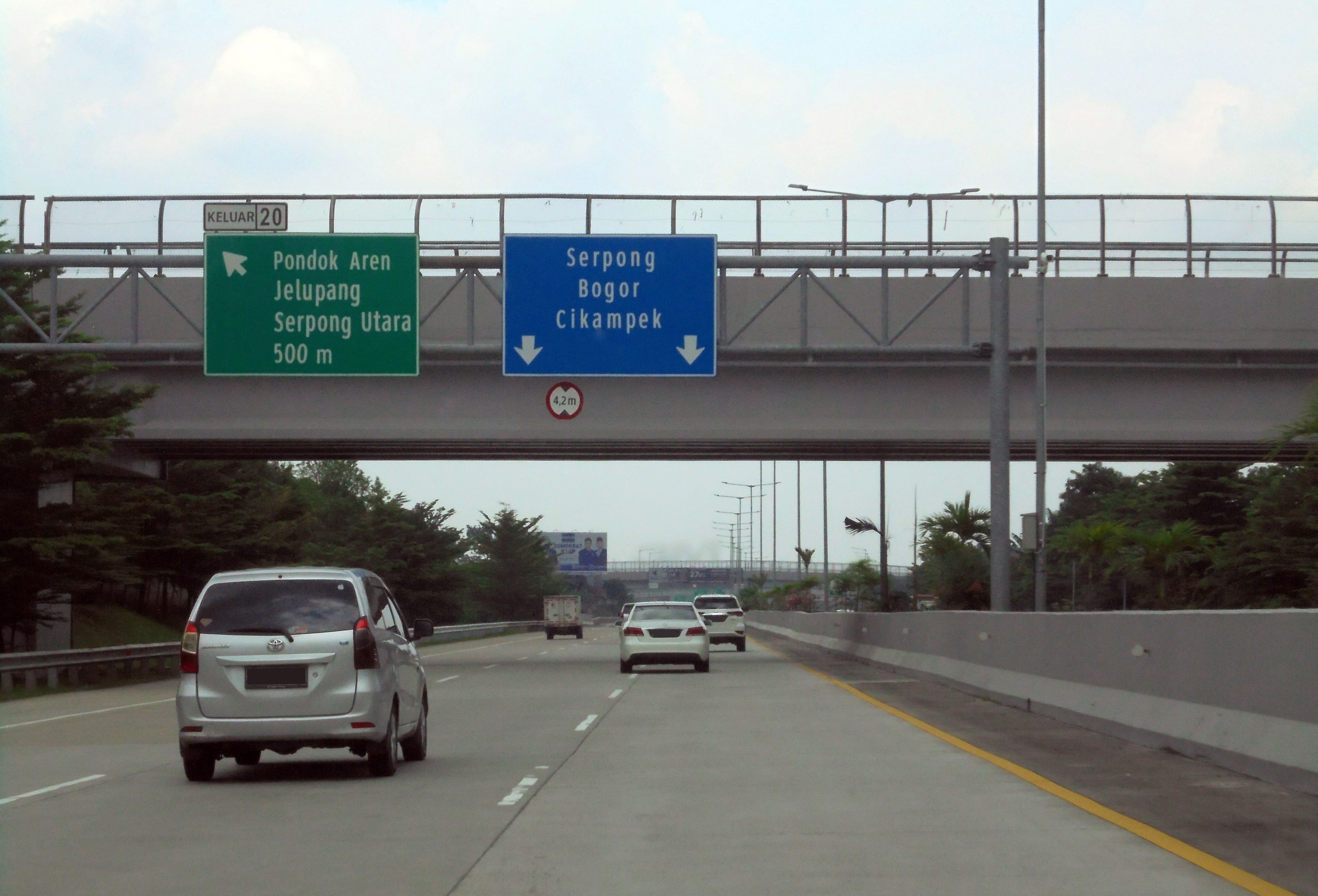
- Southbound Kunciran–Serpong Toll Road heading to Serpong, South Tangerang in 2023

Route information
- Maintained by PT Marga Trans Nusantara (MTN)
- Length: 11.19 km (6.95 mi)
- Existed: 6 December 2019–present

Major junctions
- North end: Kunciran Interchange
- Cengkareng–Batu Ceper–Kunciran Toll Road; AH2 – Jakarta–Tangerang Toll Road; Serpong–Cinere Toll Road
- South end: Serpong Interchange

Location
- Country: Indonesia
- Provinces: Banten
- Major cities: Tangerang; South Tangerang

Highway system
- Transport in Indonesia

Kunciran–Serpong Toll Road (Kunser) is a toll road, which runs from Kunciran to Serpong in Greater Jakarta, Indonesia. This toll road is part of the Jakarta Outer Ring Road 2 network that will connect Soekarno-Hatta International Airport to Cilincing. The toll is connected to the Jakarta–Tangerang Toll Road, Cengkareng–Batu Ceper–Kunciran Toll Road, Jakarta–Serpong Toll Road, and Cinere–Serpong Toll Road.

Kunciran-Serpong toll road is 11.19 kilometres (6.95 mi) long, which consists of two sections. Section 1 runs from Kunciran to Parigi (6.9 kilometres [4.3 mi]), and section 2, from Parigi to Serpong (4.3 kilometres [2.7 mi]). The toll road was officially inaugurated by President Joko Widodo on 6 December 2019.

== Exits ==
Province	Location	km	mi	Exit	Name	Destinations	Notes
Banten	Pinang, Tangerang	13.2	8.2	Cengkareng–Batu Ceper–Kunciran Toll Road			
Banten	Pinang, Tangerang	14.4	8.9	14	Kunciran Interchange	Jakarta–Tangerang Toll Road; Westbound; Tangerang; Karawaci; Tangerang–Merak Toll Road; Eastbound; Karangtengah; Jakarta Outer Ring Road; Jakarta Inner Ring Road	Northern terminus
Banten	Pondok Aren, South Tangerang	20.2	12.6	46	Parigi/Jelupang Toll Gate	Eastbound; Pondok Aren; Bintaro; Jombang; Westbound; Jelupang; Pondok Jagung; North Serpong	
Banten	Ciputat, South Tangerang	25.0	15.5	25	Serpong Interchange	Jakarta–Serpong Toll Road; Westbound; Serpong; Serpong–Balaraja Toll Road; Eastbound; Pondok Aren; Jakarta Outer Ring Road	Southern terminus
Banten	Ciputat, South Tangerang	25.8	16.0	Cinere–Serpong Toll Road			
1.000 mi = 1.609 km; 1.000 km = 0.621 mi: Route transition

== See also ==
- Trans-Java toll road
