= Perigi Lama =

Coordinates: 6°15′56″S 106°41′49″E

Perigi Lama, Perigi
- Village
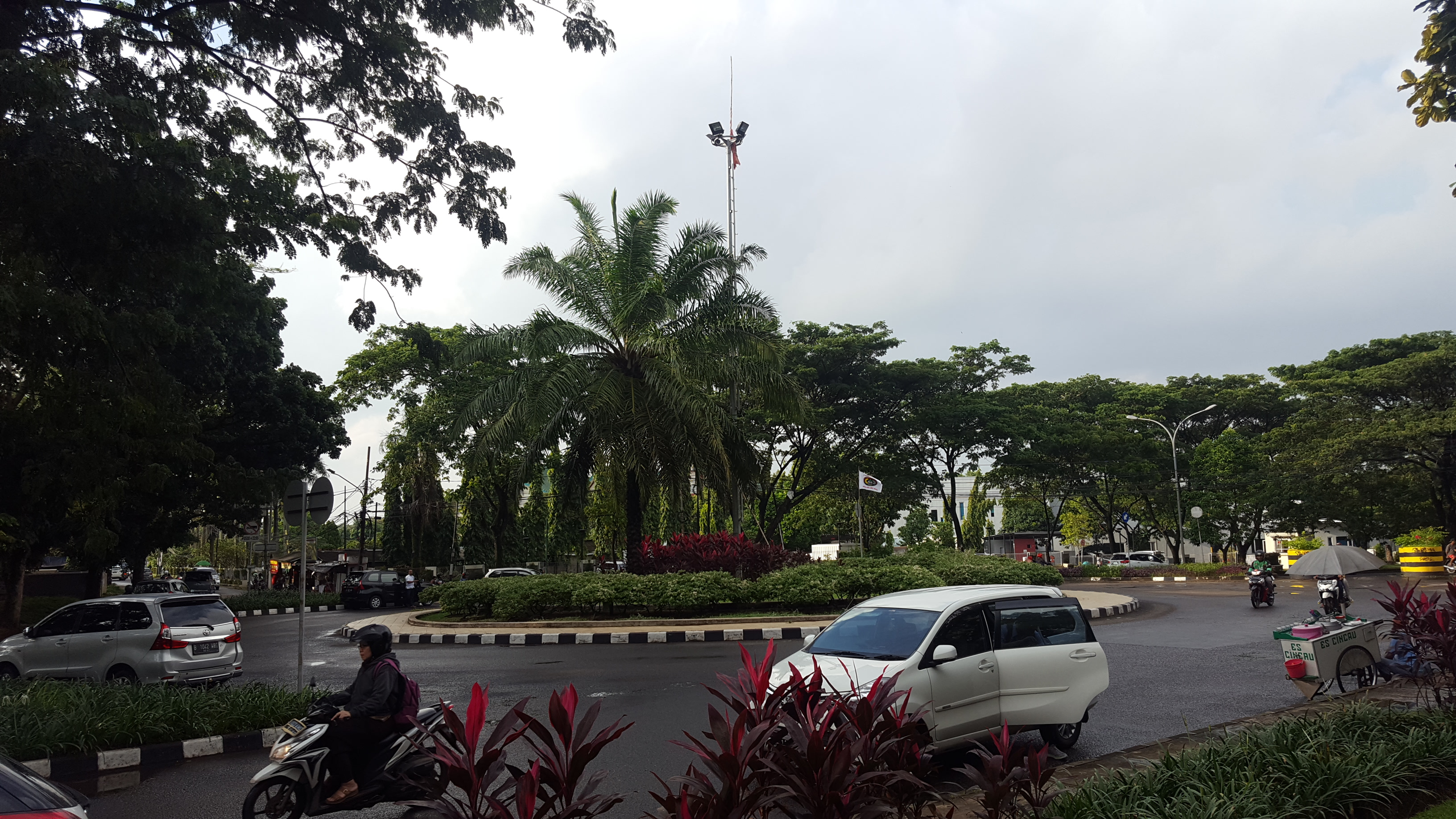
- Next to Global Jaya School
- Interactive map of Perigi Lama, Perigi
- Country: Indonesia
- Province: Banten
- Regency: South Tangerang
- Elevation: 38 m (125 ft)

Population
  - Total: 12,859

Perigi Lama, Parigi Lama, or simply Perigi is a kelurahan (village) at Pondok Aren district, South Tangerang, Banten. Perigi Lama in Indonesian means "Old Perigi" because the neighboring kelurahan/village is called Perigi Baru which in opposite means "New Perigi".

== History ==
The area of this village is about 450 hectares with land, river, lake and paddy fields. The population of this village is about 15 thousand people consisting of the indigenous people which are the Betawi people, also with other ethnic groups such as some Chinese, Javanese, Sundanese, Batak, Minangkabau, Madurenesse and others. In this village there is a lake which is called Setu Perigi. This kelurahan was once a model village when still part of the province of West Java.

Due to the current era of globalization and modernization, this village now has become an area with the presence of many international facilities and a number of modern housings.

== Geography ==
Parigi Lama is located close and partially part of Bintaro Jaya. Parigi Lama contains many international and national schools such as the British International School, Jakarta Japanese School (ジャカルタ日本人学校), Aulia Islamic School, Pembangunan Jaya High School, Tunas Indonesia Elementary School, Global Jaya School, and Mentari International School. There are also a number of modern housings and clusters in this area such as Discovery Serenity, Permata Bintaro, Emerald Bintaro and Graha Raya Bintaro.

There is a National Heroes cemetery in Parigi Lama, which is called "Taman Makam Bahagia ABRI" located to the south of Global Jaya International School.
