= Bintaro Jaya =

Planned township in South Tangerang, Indonesia

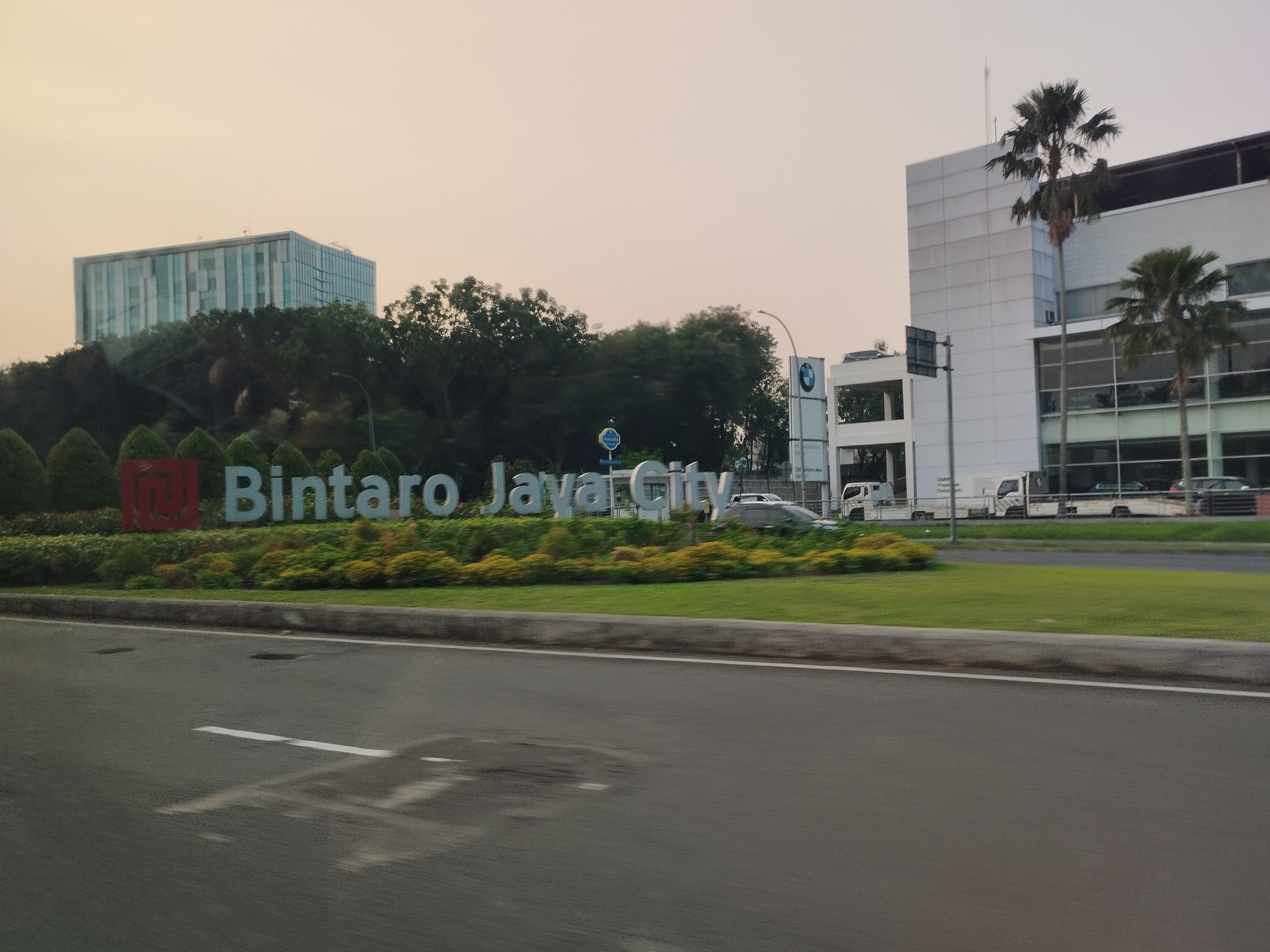
- Bintaro Jaya Boulevard in South Tangerang
- Interactive map of Bintaro Jaya
- Location: South Tangerang, Banten, Indonesia; Pondok Aren; North Serpong; East Ciputat; Ciputat; South Jakarta, Jakarta, Indonesia; Pesanggrahan; Tangerang, Banten, Indonesia; Pinang; Ciledug
- Coordinates: 6°16′20″S 106°45′10″E
- Opening: 1979
- Website: www.bintarojaya.id

Companies
- Owner: Jaya Group
- Manager: PT Jaya Real Property Tbk

Technical details
- Size: 2,499 ha

Bintaro Jaya is a planned township located in Greater Jakarta, Indonesia. It is developed by PT Jaya Real Property Tbk (formerly PT Bintaro Jaya). The development of the township began within South Jakarta and some part of South Tangerang in 1979 and is expanded further to all of South Tangerang (Pondok Aren and North Serpong) and some area of Tangerang in Banten province. The township is built as a satellite city for Jakarta, with a total land area of more than 2000 hectares. The name Bintaro is derived from the Bintaro Village in Pesanggrahan that is also bordering this area, which takes the name of Bintaro plant (Cerbera manghas), whereas Jaya came from the name of the developer. Bintaro Jaya along with Bumi Serpong Damai (BSD) is one of the largest township in Indonesia.

Since the development of the Serpong, Pondok Aren, and Jombang areas in the 1990s, Bintaro Jaya has become part of the adjacent residential and mixed-use areas that have been successfully developed in the Greater Tangerang region, such as BSD City, Alam Sutera, and Gading Serpong. This has also been supported by the construction of direct access routes to these areas, such as direct access to Alam Sutera (adjacent) from Bintaro Jaya and direct access to Jl. Raya Serpong, as well as via Jl. Raya Setu leading to BSD City.

== History ==
Bintaro Jaya started being developed in 1979 by PT Jaya Real Property Tbk, a subsidiary of PT Pembangunan Jaya whose majority shares are owned by the DKI Jakarta Regional Government. For 25 years, Jaya Property has been known as one of the capital's real estate companies. PT Pembangunan Jaya carries out the construction and management of housing and property projects, including Graha Raya, Puri Jaya, Plaza Bintaro Jaya, Plaza Slipi Jaya, and the Senen Trade Center block IV–V.

Bintaro Jaya was the first to introduce the concept of a "garden city" in Indonesia. 26 years later, Bintaro Jaya uses the slogan "The Professional's City" to reflect its marketing strategy as the residence of choice for Jakarta's intellectuals and professionals. It houses a variety of facilities to support the physical and social environment as designed to meet the residents' needs for comfortable housing.

== Sectors and Districts ==
=== Sectors ===
The township is originally divided into 10 sectors. Sectors 1 of the township are located in Bintaro district of South Jakarta, whereas sectors 2 to 10 are located in Pondok Aren, East Ciputat & North Serpong districts of South Tangerang and some parts of sector 10 located in Pinang & Ciledug, Tangerang. The central business district of Bintaro Jaya is located in Sector 7, hosting offices, malls, apartments, and retail shophouses.

Administrative districts of Bintaro Jaya sectors
Bintaro Jaya sector	Kelurahan	District / City	Postal code
1	Bintaro	Pesanggrahan, South Jakarta	12330
2	Rengas	East Ciputat, South Tangerang	15412
3	Pondok Betung	Pondok Aren, South Tangerang	15221
3A	Pondok Ranji	East Ciputat, South Tangerang	15412
4	Pondok Karya	Pondok Aren, South Tangerang	15222
5 (Puter-Pisok)	Jurang Manggu Timur	Pondok Aren, South Tangerang	15222
5 (Pisok)	Pondok Ranji	East Ciputat, South Tangerang	15412
5 (Perkici)	Jurang Manggu Barat	Pondok Aren, South Tangerang	15223
6 (Cikini)	Jurang Manggu Barat	Pondok Aren, South Tangerang	15223
8 (River Park)	Pondok Jaya	Pondok Aren, South Tangerang	15224
9 (Rajawali)	Pondok Pucung	Pondok Aren, South Tangerang	15229
9 (Kasuari, Maleo, Flamingo, Mertilang, Kucica, Elang)	Pondok Pucung	Pondok Aren, South Tangerang	15229
10 (Graha Bintaro)	West Pondok Kacang	Pondok Aren, South Tangerang	15226
10 (Graha Raya)	Paku Jaya & East Pondok Jagung	North Serpong, South Tangerang	15324 & 15326
10 (Northern Graha Raya and Fortune)	Tajur, Sudimara Pinang	Ciledug, Tangerang; Pinang, Tangerang	15152, 15145

=== Districts ===
In its expansion, districts are added as the developer transitions into a more cluster-based residential development. Some of the districts are named based on neighborhoods in Jakarta (Menteng, Senayan, Kebayoran).

Administrative districts of Bintaro Jaya districts
Bintaro Jaya district	Subdistrict	District / City	Postal code
Discovery Residences	Parigi Lama	Pondok Aren, South Tangerang	15227
Emerald Bintaro	Parigi Lama	Pondok Aren, South Tangerang	15227
Graha Taman Bintaro	Pondok Pucung	Pondok Aren, South Tangerang	15229
Kebayoran Residences	Pondok Jaya	Pondok Aren, South Tangerang	15224
Kebayoran Village	Pondok Pucung	Pondok Aren, South Tangerang	15229
Menteng Bintaro	Pondok Ranji	Ciputat, South Tangerang	15412
Puri Bintaro	Sawah Baru	Ciputat, South Tangerang	15413
Permata Bintaro	Pondok Pucung	Pondok Aren, South Tangerang	15229
(Adora, Calysta, Oriana, Vania) Permata	Jombang	Ciputat, South Tangerang	15414
Senayan Bintaro	Pondok Pucung	Pondok Aren, South Tangerang	15229
Mahagoni-Althia	Parigi Lama	Pondok Aren, South Tangerang	15227

== Facilities ==
The township has many office buildings along with the residential clusters. There are hospitals, educational institutions, shopping malls, mosques and churches, a driving range and playground.

=== Educational institutions ===
- British School Jakarta,
- Jakarta Japanese School (ジャカルタ日本人学校),
- Global Jaya School
- Mentari Intercultural School Bintaro
- Universitas Pembangunan Jaya
- SD-SMP Pembangunan Jaya
- BPK Penabur Bintaro
- PKN STAN

=== Places of interest ===
- Menteng Park – 30-hectare public park featuring gardens, a playground, and absorption wells
- Trans Snow World Bintaro – Indoor snow sports arena with a short chairlift, offering skiing, tubing, and sledding.
- BXSea Bintaro Jaya - An oceanarium located in the Bintaro Jaya XChange Mall, displaying 54 exhibits and 140 species of fishes, inverterbrates, reptiles and others.
- Bintaro Toll Gate Garden
- Bintaro Driving Range

=== Malls, retail, and accommodation ===
- Bintaro Plaza
- Bintaro Xchange Mall
- Lotte Mart
- Bintaro Modern Market/Pasar Modern
- Fresh Market Emerald Bintaro
- Carrefour
- Giant Hypermarket
- Ace Hardware
- Hero Supermarket
- Electronic City
- Santika Hotel
- Gramedia Bookstore
- Trans Park Mall Bintaro

=== Healthcare ===
- Pondok Indah Bintaro Jaya Hospital
- Premier Bintaro Hospital
- Ihsan Medical Center
- Mitra Keluarga hospital
- RSIA Bina Media

=== Public services ===
- POLSEK Pondok Aren, is the district police of Pondok Aren which covers Bintaro Jaya sector 3-9. The police office is located at Jl. Graha Raya Bintaro, Perigi Baru.
  - POLSUBSEKTOR Bintaro 5, is a police station located at Jl. Bintaro Utama 5, Bintaro Jaya sector 5.
- The South Tangerang Fire and Rescue Agency (Pemadam Kebakaran Tangerang Selatan) is responsible for Bintaro Jaya area. Their contact number is 0811-900-074 and is available 24 hours.

== Access ==
Bintaro Jaya also has a direct access from the Ulujami-Serpong Toll Road (on the Pondok Aren exit at KM 5-6), as well as Kunciran–Serpong Toll Road (on the Parigi exit at KM 21)

== Transportation ==
Bintaro Jaya is connected with Green Line of KRL Commuterline commuter rail network, with Pondok Ranji, Jurangmangu and Sudimara stations located in the township. Transjakarta operates one premium feeder route called "Royaltrans" to connect the township with Jakarta. It has shuttle bus services both for within the township and to connect other parts of Jakarta, which are known as Trans Bintaro and In-Trans Bintaro Jaya respectively. Here are the list of transportation services that serves Bintaro Jaya

=== Bus routes ===
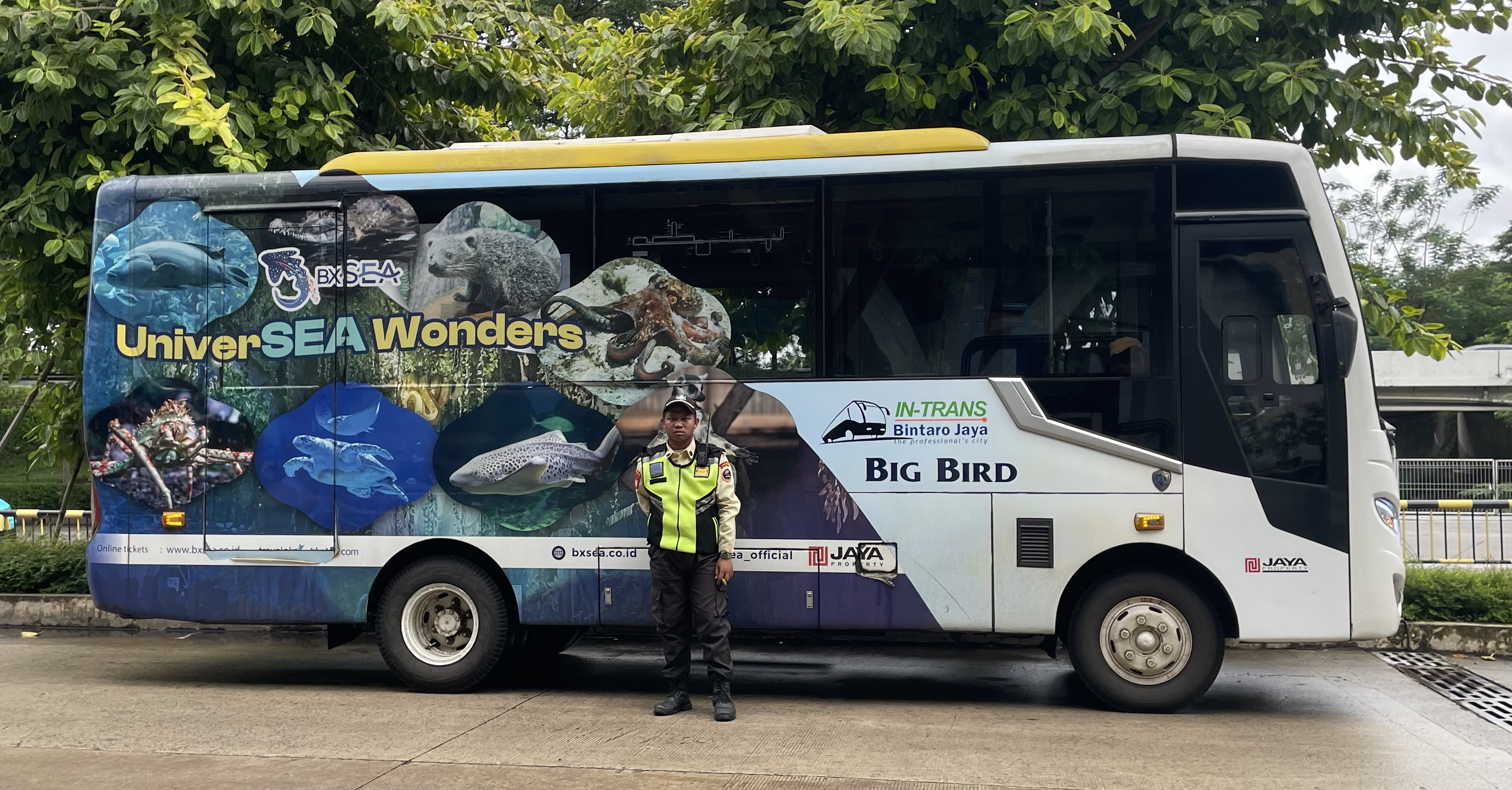
In-Trans bus at Bintaro Jaya Xchange Mall

- In-Trans Bintaro Jaya
  - Jurangmangu station–Kebayoran District
  - Jurangmangu station–Emerald/Discovery District
  - Jurangmangu station–Bintaro CBD
- Trans Bintaro
  - Bintaro Jaya Xchange–Pondok Indah Mall–Gandaria City–FX Sudirman
- Angkot (Share Taxis)
  - D10 Ciputat–Pondok Aren via Bintaro Jaya
- Transjakarta
  - Royaltrans
    - S31 Bintaro Jaya–Fatmawati Indomaret MRT station

=== Train lines ===
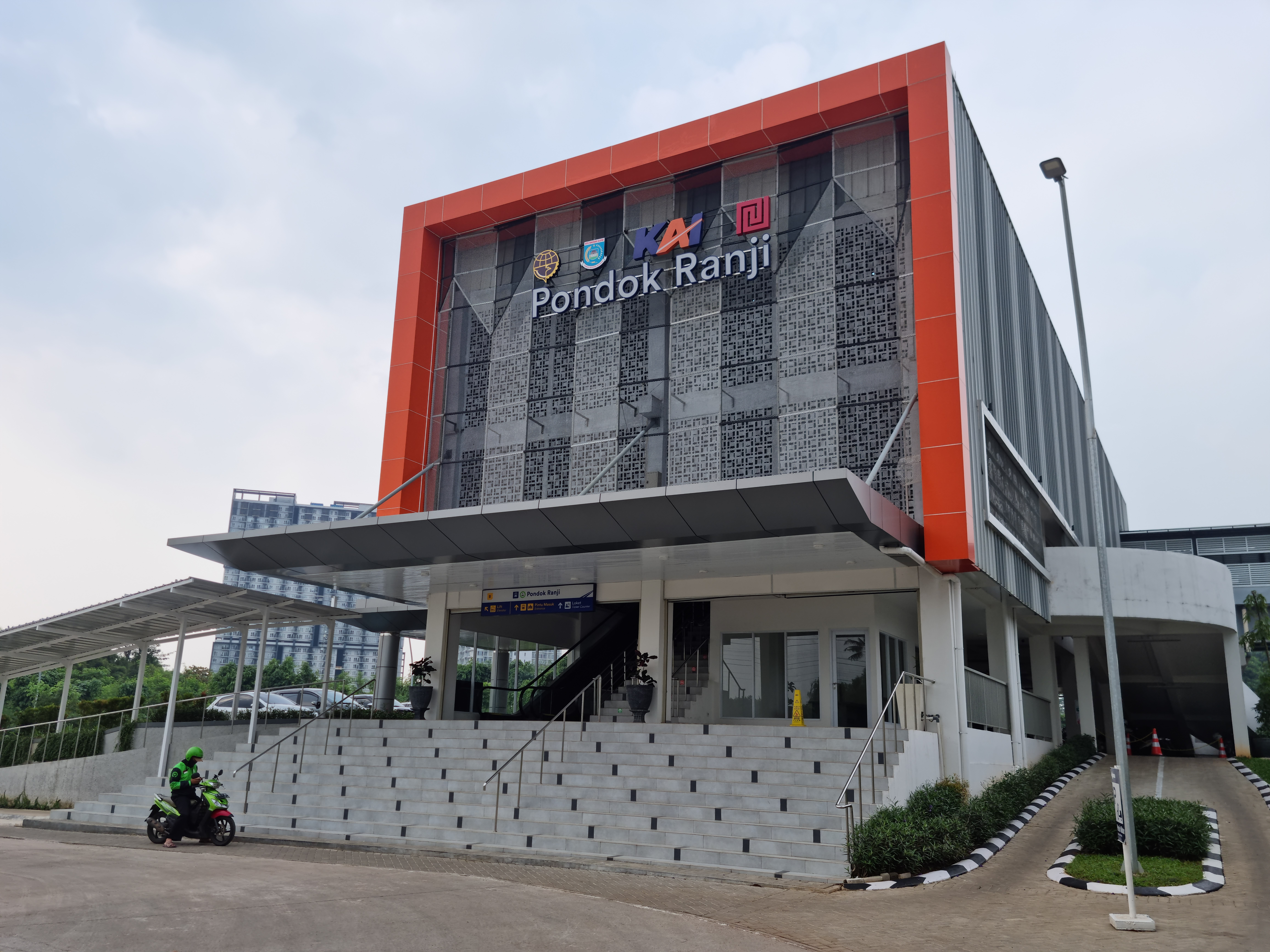
The new building of the Pondok Ranji railway station

- KRL Commuterline Rangkasbitung Line, with three stations: Pondok Ranji, Jurangmangu and Sudimara

=== Jakarta MRT ===
In the future, Bintaro Jaya will be connected and has plans for the Jakarta MRT North South Line Extension, connecting Lebak Bulus in the east and Serpong in the west via Pondok Aren.

This MRT plan will run through Bintaro Jaya, connecting Bintaro Sector 1 to West Bintaro Jaya via the Jakarta-Serpong Toll Road and Jl. Boulevard Bintaro Jaya. This line is designed to improve connectivity and accessibility of public transportation for residents and passengers in the area. It is hoped that this line will be designed to build a transit-oriented development area, urban regeneration, and a new economic center.

== See also ==
- Pondok Aren
- North Serpong
- East Ciputat
- Ciputat
- South Tangerang
- Jabodetabek
- Alam Sutera
- BSD City
- Gading Serpong
