= Port of Merak =

Northwestern-most place of Java and seaport in Cilegon, Indonesia

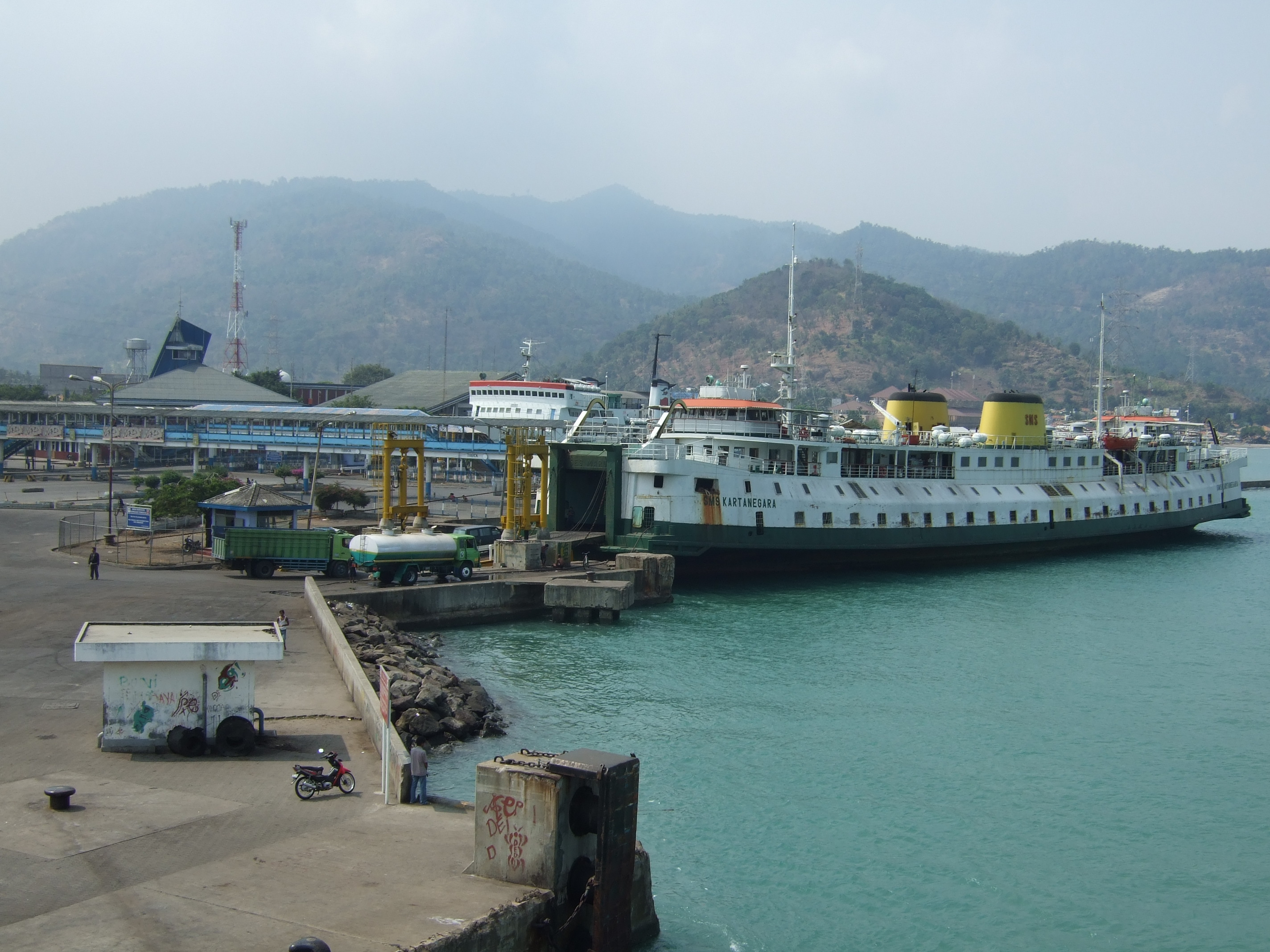
- Interactive map of Port of Merak

Location
- Country: Indonesia
- Location: Cilegon, Banten
- Coordinates: 5.930833°S 105.995278°E

Details
- Owned by: Ministry of Transportation
- Type of Harbor: Natural
- Size: 150.615 m^{2} (1,621.21 sq ft)
- No. of wharfs: 5

Statistics
- Website oppmerak.dephub.go.id

Port of Merak is a seaport located in the Pulo Merak District of the city of Cilegon, Banten, on the northwestern tip of Java, Indonesia. The port and district are named after the green peafowl, which once lived in the region, but now lives only in the nearby Ujung Kulon National Park. The port is connected to Jakarta via the Jakarta-Merak Toll Road and is also connected to the Bakauheni port which is located at the south of the Trans-Sumatran Highway.

== History ==
In 1883, the original settlement was completely destroyed by a series of tsunamis generated by the eruption of the Krakatoa volcano in the Sunda Strait. The largest wave at Merak was estimated to be at least 41 metres (135 ft) high. Approximately 2,700 people lost their lives, most of the town's inhabitants at that time.

== Features ==
A large thermal electric power plant is located close to Merak where coal barges handle large quantities of coal. A new LPG jetty handles liquid gases for distribution in Banten province, tankage has been built at Merak.

The town of Cilegon is about 15–20 kilometres (9.3–12.4 mi) from Merak port. There is heavy truck traffic on the road from Cilegon to Merak so the road is often in poor condition. In downtown Cilegon there is a hypermart mall and some shanty shops. Karaoke bars for sailors are not hard to find.

== Port operations ==
The port is a key transport link between Java and Sumatra and is a major service provider for the heavy passenger and commercial ferry traffic from Merak to Bakauheni across the Sunda Strait on the southern tip of Sumatra. Ferry services are operated by ASDP Indonesia Ferry.

Growth in demand for ferry services has been rapid in recent years. The facilities at the port are now very badly overstretched. The ageing ferry fleet and poor supporting infrastructure are major restrictions on the port's efficiency. Long delays for passengers, buses and trucks waiting to board the ferries are common, especially at peak times of the year such as holiday periods when daily demand rises to over 2,000 cars and up to 500 buses per day. It is not unusual for trucks to bank up for 10 kilometres (6.2 mi) or more from the port on the Jakarta-Merak Toll Road and be held up in queues for two or three days. It is partly because of problems of this kind that consideration is being given to the very ambitious Sunda Strait Bridge project.

Merak port also provides services for Indonesia's largest concentration of petrochemical facilities located nearby along the Merak peninsula. More than 40 petrochemical plants operate near the seaport, an increase from two in 1990. In 2007 Shell Oil announced plans to expand its Merak port operations with the construction of a $US52 million oil storage tank.

== See also ==
- List of Indonesian ports
- Ministry of Transportation, Indonesia
- Transport in Indonesia
- Cilegon

== Bibliography ==
- Winchester, Simon. Krakatoa: The Day the World Exploded: August 27, 1883. New York: HarperCollins, 2003. ISBN 0-06-621285-5
