= Serpong =

Town and District in South Tangerang City, Indonesia

- Town and District
- Location in Java and Indonesia Serpong (Indonesia)
- Coordinates: 6°18′50″S 106°38′52″E
- Country: Indonesia
- Province: Banten
- City: South Tangerang

Government
  - District Mayor: Syaifuddin, S.Pd., M.Si.

Area
  - Total: 28.27 km^{2} (10.92 sq mi)

Population (mid 2023 estimate)
  - Total: 163,451
  - Density: 5,782/km^{2} (14,970/sq mi)
- Time zone: UTC+7

Serpong is a town and an administrative district (kecamatan) of South Tangerang city, in Banten Province on Java, Indonesia. Before South Tangerang City became an autonomous city, Serpong District was one of the districts of Tangerang Regency. It covers an area of 28.27 km^{2}, and had a population of 137,212 at the 2010 Census and 154,744 at the 2020 Census; the official estimate as of mid-2023 was 163,451. The district is sub-divided into nine kelurahan (urban communities).

== Neighbouring districts ==
Direction	Borders with
North	North Serpong
East	Ciputat; Pamulang; Pondok Aren
South	Setu
West	Tangerang Regency (Cisauk and Pagedangan districts)

== Communities ==
Serpong District is sub-divided into nine urban communities (kelurahan) listed below with their areas and their officially-estimated populations as of mid-2022, together with their postcodes.

Kode Wilayah	Name of kelurahan	Area in km^{2}	Population mid 2022 estimate	Post code
36.74.01.1001	Ciater	3.76	26,608	15310
36.74.01.1002	Rawa Buntu	3.28	28,459	15318
36.74.01.1003	Rawa Mekar Jaya	2.35	18,226	15310
36.74.01.1004	Lengkong Gudang	3.61	11,944	15321
36.74.01.1005	Lengkong Wetan	2.26	10,190	15322
36.74.01.1006	Buaran	3.34	19,405	15310
36.74.01.1007	Lengkong Gudang Timur	2.62	12,106	15321
36.74.01.1008	Cilenggang	1.43	10,560	15310
36.74.01.1009	Serpong (town)	1.39	21,213	15311
36.74.01	Totals	24.04	158,711 ^{(a)}	

Notes: (a) comprising 78,908 males and 79,803 females.

== History ==
Serpong was originally a rubber plantation, but as the growth of Jakarta's suburbs have urbanised the area, it has now been developed as an elite area. Dozens of entertainment venues, malls, and crowded centers have sprung up in Serpong. BSD City is located within this district.

== Education ==
=== Tertiary Education ===
- International University Liaison Indonesia (IULI)
- Indonesian Institute of Technology

== Transportation ==
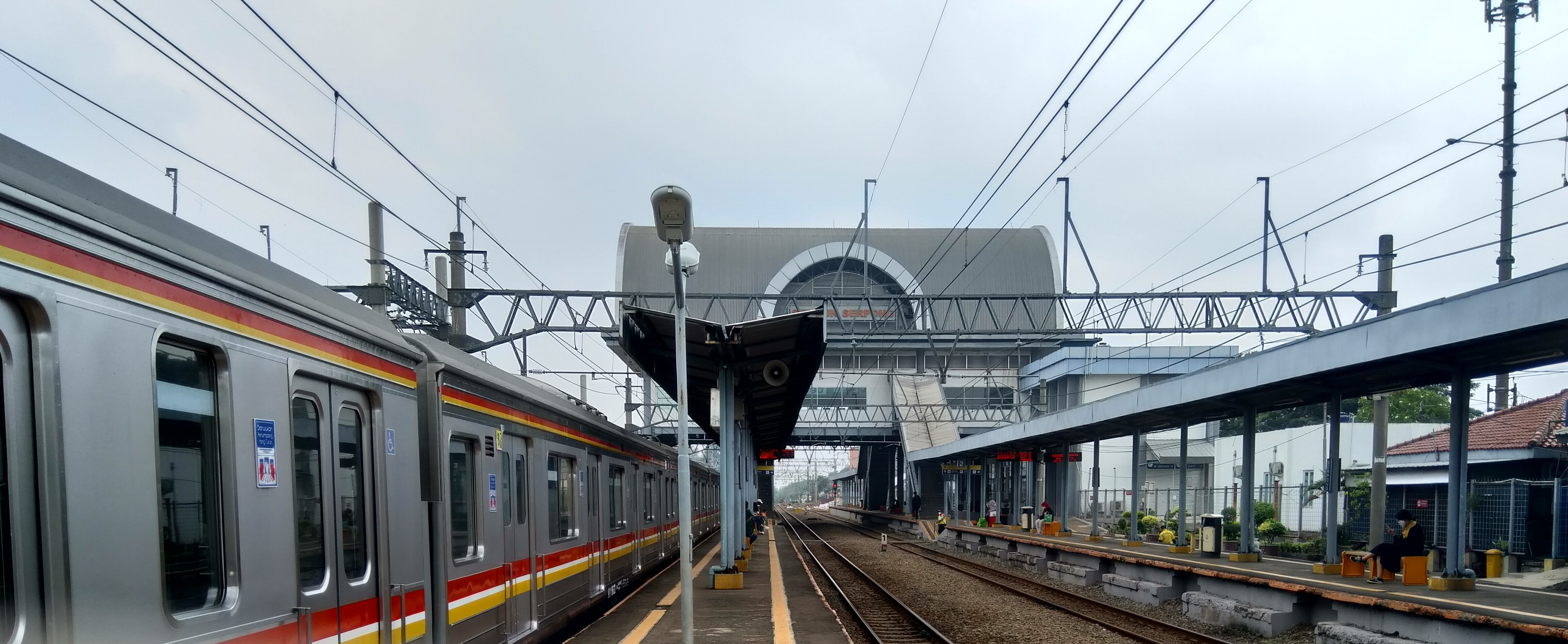
Serpong railway station is located within this district

Serpong is mainly served by land-based transportation, with buses, taxibus and taxis. The public transportation mainly goes to Jakarta since many residents from Serpong commute to Jakarta on daily basis. The district is served by KRL Commuterline through Rawa Buntu railway station and Serpong railway station. Serpong is serviced by these toll roads:

1. Jakarta–Serpong Toll Road
2. Serpong–Balaraja Toll Road
3. Jakarta–Tangerang Toll Road
4. Cengkareng–Batu Ceper–Kunciran Toll Road (Jakarta Outer Ring Road 2)

After the construction of Cengkareng–Batu Ceper–Kunciran Toll Road, Serpong is now directly connected with Soekarno-Hatta International Airport.

== See also ==
- South Tangerang
- List of districts of Banten
- Districts of Indonesia
