= Pinang, Tangerang =

Pinang
- Town and district
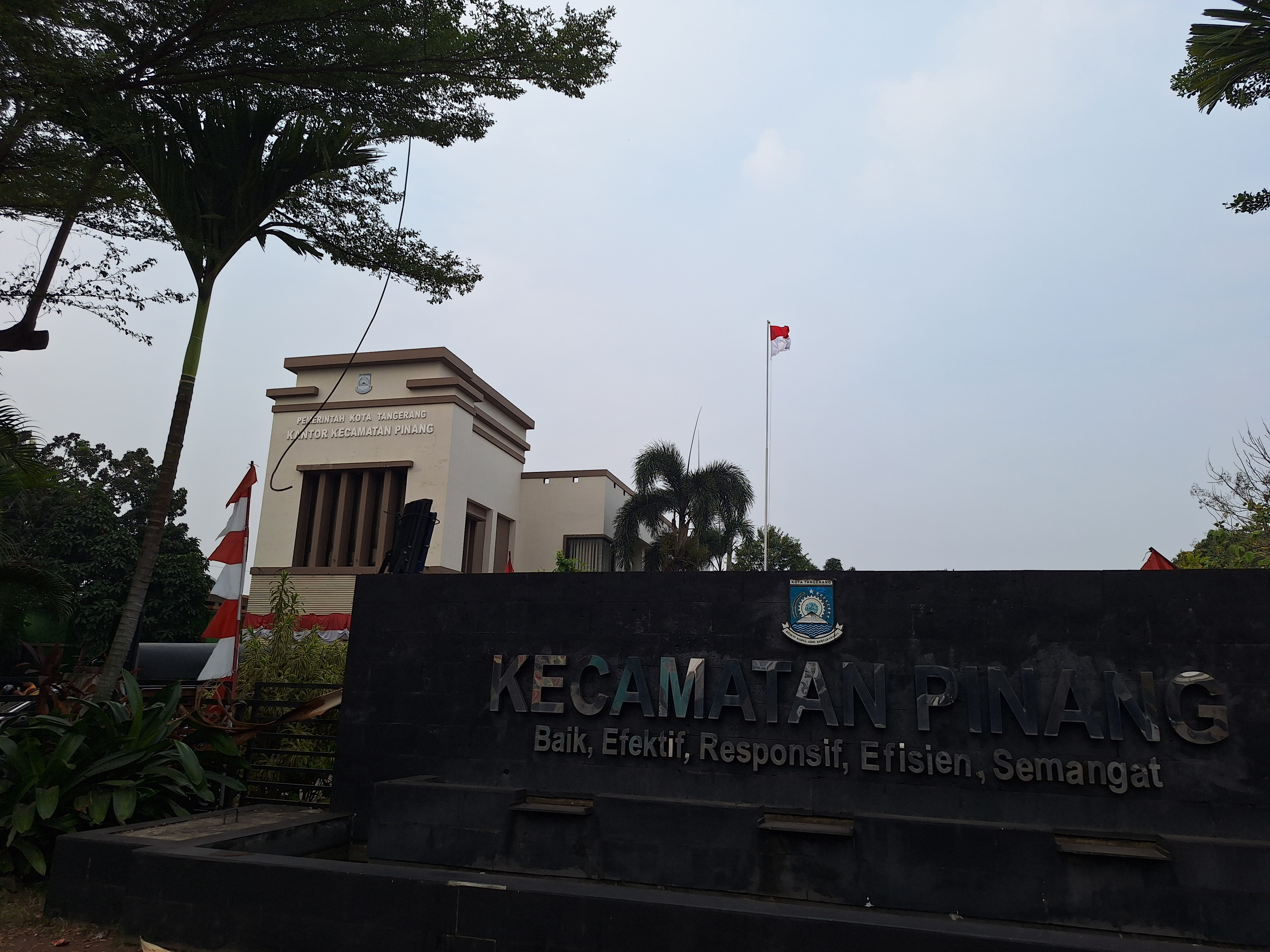
- Pinang Sub-district office
- Interactive map of Pinang
- Country: Indonesia
- Province: Banten
- Municipality: Tangerang City

Area
  - Total: 21.59 km^{2} (8.34 sq mi)

Population (mid 2023 estimate)
  - Total: 186,671
  - Density: 8,646/km^{2} (22,390/sq mi)

Pinang is a town and an administrative district (kecamatan) of Tangerang City, in Banten Province of Indonesia, on the island of Java. The district covers an area of 21.59 km^{2}. According to Indonesia's Central Agency of Statistics (BPS), the district's population was 185,342 in 2022 and 186,671 at the end of 2024.

Situated in the southern part of Tangerang, Pinang District features a blend of residential, educational, and infrastructural developments. Pinang is also known for its planned township Alam Sutera, which features residential areas, commercial centers, and recreational facilities.

Additionally, Pinang is home to two private universities Bina Nusantara University (Binus) and the University of Bunda Mulia (UBM), both of which have featured in reputable academic institution rankings such as Times Higher Education and QS. These institutions attract a significant number of students from various regions of Indonesia and abroad, adding to the district's diverse character and sense of prestige.

Pinang is strategically traversed by major transportation routes, including the Jakarta-Merak Toll Road and the Jakarta Outer Ring Road 2. The district features a significant infrastructure node, the Kunciran Interchange, where these two toll roads intersect. This interchange enhances the district's connectivity, facilitating smooth transit and access to other parts of Tangerang and Jakarta.

Pinang was established as an independent district in 2000, following its separation from the Cipondoh District. Since then, Pinang has witnessed substantial population growth and project development, emerging as an important district within the city of Tangerang.

== Communities ==
Pinang District is sub-divided into 11 urban communities (kelurahan), as detailed below.

Area code	Name of kelurahan	Area in km^{2}	Population (Mid-2022 estimate)	Postal code
36.71.11.1001	Pinang (town)	1.72	21,442	15145
36.71.11.1002	Sudimara Pinang	1.18	18,757	15145
36.71.11.1003	Neroktog	1.90	18,237	15145
36.71.11.1004	Kunciran	1.18	17,050	15144
36.71.11.1005	Kunciran Indah	1.83	34,421	15144
36.71.11.1006	Kunciran Jaya	2.40	10,062	15144
36.71.11.1007	Cipete	2.10	17,000	15142
36.71.11.1008	Pakojan	2.10	8,394	15142
36.71.11.1009	Panunggangan	2.04	10,672	15143
36.71.11.1010	Panunggangan Utara	2.06	24,164	15143
36.71.11.1011	Panunggangan Timur	2.06	3,404	15143
36.71.11	Totals	20.57	183,603 ^{(a)}	

Notes: (a) the gender distribution of the population is estimated at 92,133 males and 91,470 females.

The district’s location and infrastructure developments, such as major highways and educational institutions, make it a significant part of Tangerang’s urban landscape. The presence of key amenities and the township's planned background further enhance the appeal of these communities for both residents and visitors.

== Tourist attractions and shopping ==
- Mall @ Alam Sutera
- Situ Cipondoh, an artificial urban lake
- Downtown Lake Alam Sutera
- Kampung Wisata Pinggir Rawa

== Transportation ==
The Pinang District is well-connected by a variety of public transportation options, including bus services. There are future plans for a major mass rapid transit (MRT) line.

=== Bus services ===
- 1. TransJakarta S11 (BSD - Jelambar)

The TransJakarta S11 bus route connects BSD City (Bumi Serpong Damai) to Jelambar, passing through key areas, including the Pinang District. This route provides a vital link for commuters traveling between Tangerang and Jakarta.

- 2. Trans Kota Tangerang T11 (Corridor 3) TangCity Mall - CBD Ciledug (TransJakarta CBD Ciledug Stop)

The Trans Kota Tangerang T11 bus route, part of the Transjakarta bus rapid transit system's (BRT) Corridor 3 route, connects TangCity Mall to CBD Ciledug, with a stop at the TransJakarta CBD Ciledug. This route serves as an important connector within Tangerang City, facilitating smooth transit for passengers within the city and to connecting points in Jakarta.
