= British School Jakarta =

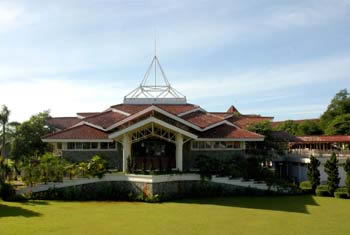

Location
- Bintaro Sektor 9 Jl. Raya Jombang-Ciledug; Perigi Lama, Pondok Aren; South Tangerang 15427; Indonesia; 6.273°S 106.704°E

Information
- Type: Private International Baccalaureate World school
- Motto: To Inspire, Challenge and Nurture for Excellence
- Established: 1973; 53 years ago
- Houses: 4
- Colours: Red, white, blue
- Affiliation: SEASAC, Federation of British International Schools in Asia (FOBISIA)
- Website: www.bsj.sch.id

The British School Jakarta (BSJ) is an independent school in South Tangerang city, Indonesia. The city is in Banten province, although it is still part of the Greater Jakarta, Indonesia. The British School Jakarta is an international member of the Headmasters' and Headmistresses' Conference. It was established in Jakarta in 1973 under the auspices of the British Embassy. The main campus was relocated to Bintaro in 1994 to accommodate increasing numbers of students. The school offers classes for students from pre-school to Year 13 based on an inquiry-based, active, engaging, and dynamic curriculum. Kindergarten follows the UK Early Years Foundation Stage (EYFS), and Years 1-6 are based on the English National Curriculum (ENC) and an inquiry-based exploratory framework which covers foundation subjects. In Years 7-11, BSJ offers the International Baccalaureate Middle Years Programme (IB MYP), while Years 12 and 13 have access to the International Baccalaureate Diploma Programme(IB DP).

The school changed its name from British International School to British School Jakarta in 2014 to correspond to the Indonesian government's regulations on prohibiting the use of the word "international" in school names.

== History ==
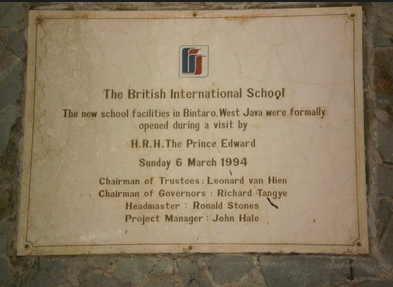
A plate marking the visit of H.R.H. The Prince Edward in 1994

The British School was first established in Jakarta in 1973 under the auspices of the British Embassy. In 1975 the committee of parents responsible for the School approached a group of British businessmen for the purpose of setting up an enlarged facility in specially-built premises in Permata Hijau. In 1976, The British School was established as a Yayasan or Foundation, in keeping with the laws of Indonesia. In the early 1980s the school was renamed The British International School under Queen Elizabeth II's command.

In 1989, Diana Frances Spencer, otherwise known as Princess Diana of Wales, visited BSJ.

In 1990, when there was much pressure for spaces in the school, market research surveys and feasibility studies led to the decision to find a new site on which to build a new school for an enlarged intake and an extended age range – what became known as the Relocation Project. That Project reached its climax in the school year 1993-94 when the Permata Hijau site was closed and the School took over its new facilities on a 13-hectare (32-acre) site in Bintaro, southwest of Jakarta. The new BIS was officially opened by Prince Edward in March 1994, and the first full stage of the project completed in the summer of 1994.

Campus Phase Two, which started in 1997, included the addition of the Cafeteria, the Art and Technology Block in the Secondary School and several smaller projects to improve and develop the campus. In 1999 the school opened a new Early Years Education Centre in Pondok Indah in response to growing demand for places in Pre-School and Reception classes. In February 2007 a new Performing Arts centre, the BIS World Theatre, was opened providing facilities and three performance areas. The Theatre was officially opened by the Duke of York, Prince Andrew, on 6 March 2008.

In early 2009, the construction of the Secondary Library Building was completed, which houses a cafe, meeting rooms and additional class room spaces. Extra land was purchased at the Bintaro campus and the School's Strategic Development Plan provides a framework for the future. An extension to the IB Centre to accommodate growing demand was completed in December 2009. In 2012 the Early Years Centre was comprehensively refurbished and reopened on site. In 2014 the school name changed to British School Jakarta to comply with new Indonesian law. In 2015 construction of the New Sports Hall commenced as part of the development of the East Campus, and this facility has been in use since mid-2017. Since 2019 many classrooms have been remodelled to reflect the school’s innovative approach to learning and teaching. In 2025 The Arena was completed as an all-weather venue designed for sport, performances and community gatherings.

In 2015, BSJ was awarded the TES British International School of the Year.

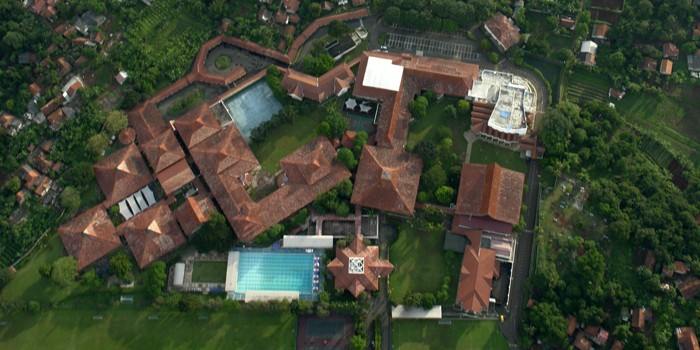
Bird's-eye view of the BSJ campus

== Campuses ==
The school is set in a fourteen hectare campus in Perigi Lama, Bintaro. It is located near Bintaro Xchange Mall.

== Notable Alumni ==
- Maudy Ayunda, singer-songwriter, graduated 2013
- Frederika Alexis Cull, beauty pageant titleholder who won Puteri Indonesia 2019
- Karina Basrewan, news anchor and Miss Earth Indonesia 2022
- Elkan Baggott, Indonesian football player
- Sherina Munaf, Indonesian singer-songwriter
- Warren Hue, Indonesian rapper, singer-songwriter and producer
