= East Ciputat =

Coordinates: 6°18′40″S 106°45′43″E

East Ciputat Ciputat Timur
- District
- Interactive map of East Ciputat
- Country: Indonesia
- Province: Banten
- Municipality: South Tangerang City

Area
  - Total: 17.81 km^{2} (6.88 sq mi)

Population (mid 2023 estimate)
  - Total: 169,555
  - Density: 9,520/km^{2} (24,660/sq mi)

East Ciputat (Indonesian: Ciputat Timur) is an administrative district (kecamatan) in the city of South Tangerang, Banten Province, on Java, Indonesia. It is inside the Greater Jakarta metropolitan area, and is situated to the east of Ciputat. It covers an area of 17.81 km^{2} and its population was 178,818 at the 2010 Census and 172,139 at the 2020 Census; the official estimate as of mid-2023 was 169,555.

== History ==
East Ciputat was previously part of Ciputat district before it was split off from the eastern part of the district in 2007.

== Communities ==
East Ciputat District is sub-divided into six urban communities (kelurahan), listed below with their areas and their officially-estimated populations as of mid-2022, together with their postcodes.

Kode Wilayah	Name of kelurahan	Area in km^{2}	Population mid 2022 estimate	Post code
36.74.05.1001	Cempaka Putih	2.27	26,110	15412
36.74.05.1002	Pondok Ranji	2.06	29,764	15412
36.74.05.1003	Pisangan	3.91	36,032	15419
36.74.05.1004	Cireundeu	3.08	25,754	15419
36.74.05.1005	Rempoa	2.46	26,179	15412
36.74.05.1006	Rengas	1.65	24,089	15412
36.74.05	Totals	15.43	167,928 ^{(a)}	

Notes: (a) comprising 83,328 males and 84,600 females.

== Transportation ==
- KRL Commuter Line Rangkasbitung Line At Pondok Ranji Station
- Transjakarta S21 Ciputat - Kejaksaan Agung
- Transjakarta S22 Ciputat - Kp Rambutan
- MRT Jakarta Lebak Bulus - Bundaran HI
- MRT Jakarta (Future Planned) Lebak Bulus - Pamulang

== Access Tol ==
- Jakarta-Serpong Toll Road Exit Tol Bintaro KM 04

== See also ==
- Ciputat
- South Tangerang
- Jakarta metropolitan area
