= Jakarta–Serpong Toll Road =

Toll road in Indonesia

- Jalan Tol Jakarta–Serpong
- Ulujami–Serpong Toll Road
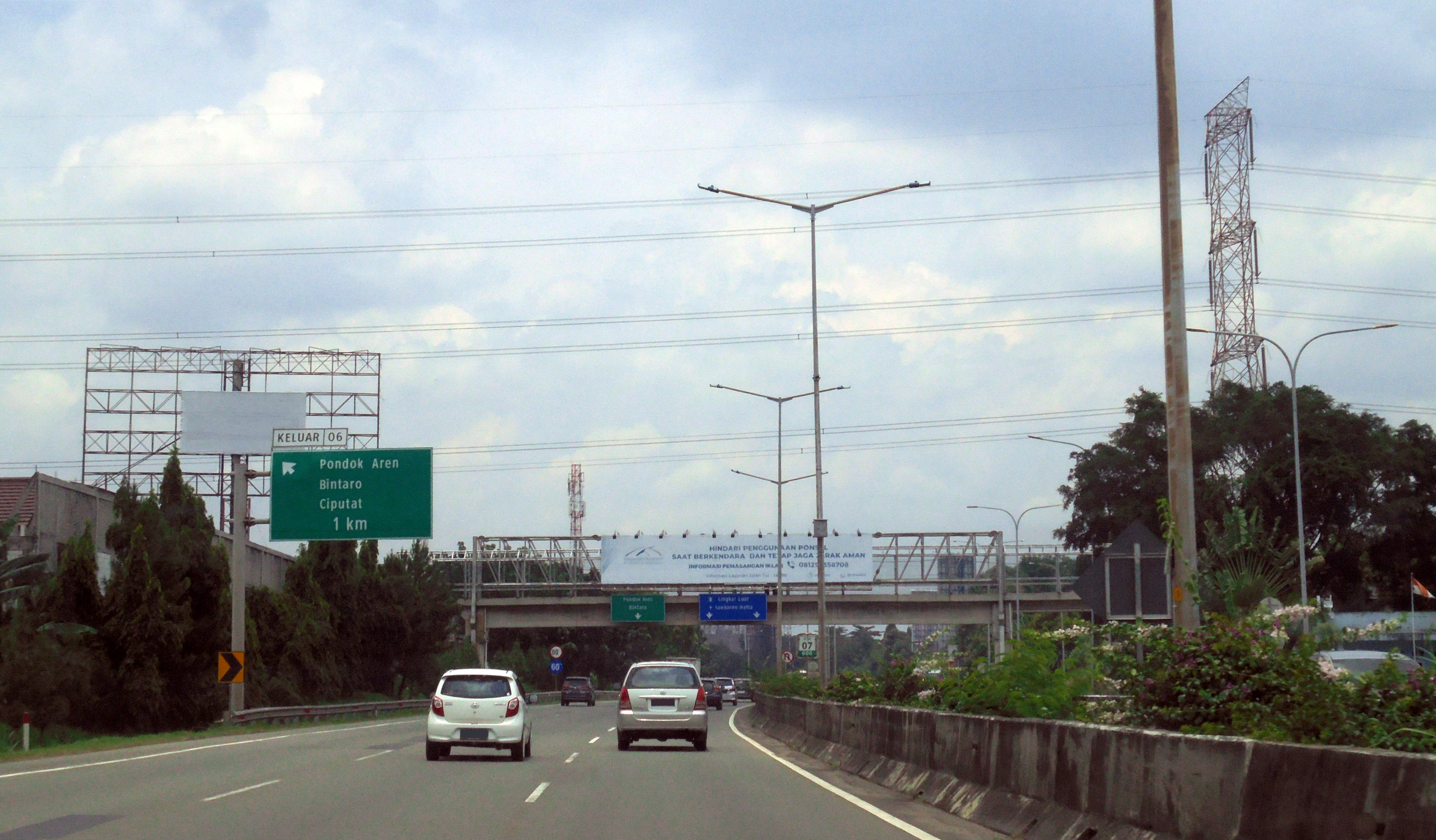
- Northeastbound Jakarta–Serpong Toll Road heading to Ulujami, South Jakarta in 2023

Route information
- Maintained by: Ulujami–Pondok Aren: Jasa Marga; Pondok Aren–Serpong: Nusantara Infrastructure
- Length: 12.5 km (7.8 mi)
- Existed: 1999–present

Major junctions
- Northeast end: Ulujami
- Jakarta Outer Ring Road; Kunciran–Serpong Toll Road/Cinere-Serpong Toll Road (Jakarta Outer Ring Road 2); Serpong–Balaraja Toll Road (partially opened)
- Southwest end: Serpong

Location
- Country: Indonesia
- Provinces: Jakarta; Banten
- Major cities: South Jakarta; South Tangerang

Highway system
- Transport in Indonesia

The Jakarta–Serpong Toll Road, also known as Ulujami–Serpong Toll Road; abbreviated as Ulser or Jakser Toll Road, is a controlled-access toll road connecting South Jakarta and South Tangerang (mainly BSD City and Bintaro Jaya) in the province of Banten, Indonesia. Operated by Jasa Marga and Nusantara Infrastructure, this toll road is connected to the Jakarta Outer Ring Road in Ulujami and Petukangan areas.

== 2022 Flood ==
The toll road was flooded due to heavy rain over South Tangerang on 4 October 2022, leading to this toll road inaccessible for traffic. It is argued that the flood happened due to lack of water storage and the narrowing of Cibenda River. The Ministry of Public Works along with PT Bumi Serpong Damai as the operator of this toll road built a retention pond to overcome the flooding, then raised the road height until 2 meters on KM 7 and cleaned river sediments in the cross-drain area.

== Exits ==
Province	Location	km	mi	Exit	Name	Destinations	Notes
DKI Jakarta	Pesanggrahan, South Jakarta	0	0.0	0	Ulujami Interchange	Jakarta Outer Ring Road; Northbound; Ciledug; Jakarta–Tangerang Toll Road; Soekarno-Hatta International Airport; Southbound; Tanah Kusir; Pondok Pinang; Jagorawi Toll Road	Eastern terminus
Banten	Pondok Aren, South Tangerang	3.2	2.0	3	Bintaro Toll Gate	Bintaro Viaduct	Eastbound exit & Westbound entry only
Banten	Pondok Aren, South Tangerang	5	3.1	Pondok Ranji Toll Gate			
Banten	Pondok Aren, South Tangerang	5	3.1	5	Pondok Ranji Ramp	Pondok Aren; Bintaro Jaya	
Banten	Pondok Aren, South Tangerang	6.4	4.0	6	Pondok Aren Toll Gate	Pondok Aren; Bintaro Jaya; Ciledug	
Banten	Ciputat, South Tangerang	8.4	5.2	8	Serpong Interchange	Jakarta Outer Ring Road 2; Southbound; Serpong–Cinere Toll Road; Southbound; Kunciran–Serpong Toll Road	
Banten	Serpong, South Tangerang	10.6	6.6	10	Pamulang Ramp	Serpong; Pamulang; Ciputat	Westbound exit & Eastbound entry only
Banten	Serpong, South Tangerang	12	7.5	12	BSD Interchange	Serpong; BSD City; Parung	Westbound exit & Eastbound entry only. Western terminus
Banten	Serpong, South Tangerang	12	7.5	Serpong–Balaraja Toll Road			
1.000 mi = 1.609 km; 1.000 km = 0.621 mi: Electronic toll collection; Incomplete access; Route transition

== See also ==
- Transport in Indonesia
