= Cipondoh =

- Town and district
- Interactive map of Cipondoh
- Country: Indonesia
- Province: Banten
- Municipality: Tangerang City

Area
  - Total: 17.91 km^{2} (6.92 sq mi)

Population (mid 2023 estimate)
  - Total: 231,127
  - Density: 12,900/km^{2} (33,420/sq mi)

Cipondoh is a town and an administrative district (kecamatan) of Tangerang City, in Banten Province of Indonesia, on the island of Java. The district covers an area of 17.91 km^{2}, and had a population of 216,346 at the 2010 Census and 248,212 at the 2020 Census; the official estimate as at mid 2023 was 231,127.

== Communities ==
Cipondoh District is sub-divided into ten urban communities (kelurahan), listed below with their areas and their officially-estimated populations as at mid 2022, together with their postcodes.

Kode Wilayah	Name of kelurahan	Area in km^{2}	Population mid 2022 estimate	Post code
36.71.05.1001	Cipondoh (town)	2.27	27,825	15148
36.71.05.1002	Cipondoh Makmur	1.48	31,905	15148
36.71.05.1003	Cipondoh Indah	1.33	24,608	15148
36.71.05.1004	Gondrong	1.87	21,458	15146
36.71.05.1005	Kenanga	2.57	16,553	15146
36.71.05.1006	Petir	1.90	21,301	15147
36.71.05.1007	Ketapang	1.80	15,222	15147
36.71.05.1008	Poris Plawad	2.05	17,507	15141
36.71.05.1009	Poris Plawad Utara	2.04	23,852	15141
36.71.05.1010	Poris Plawad Indah	2.08	25,716	15141
36.71.05	Totals	19.39	225,947 ^{(a)}	

Notes: (a) comprising 113,325 males and 112,622 females.
