= Jakarta Outer Ring Road 2 =

Toll Road in Indonesia

JORR 2 Jakarta Outer Ring Road 2

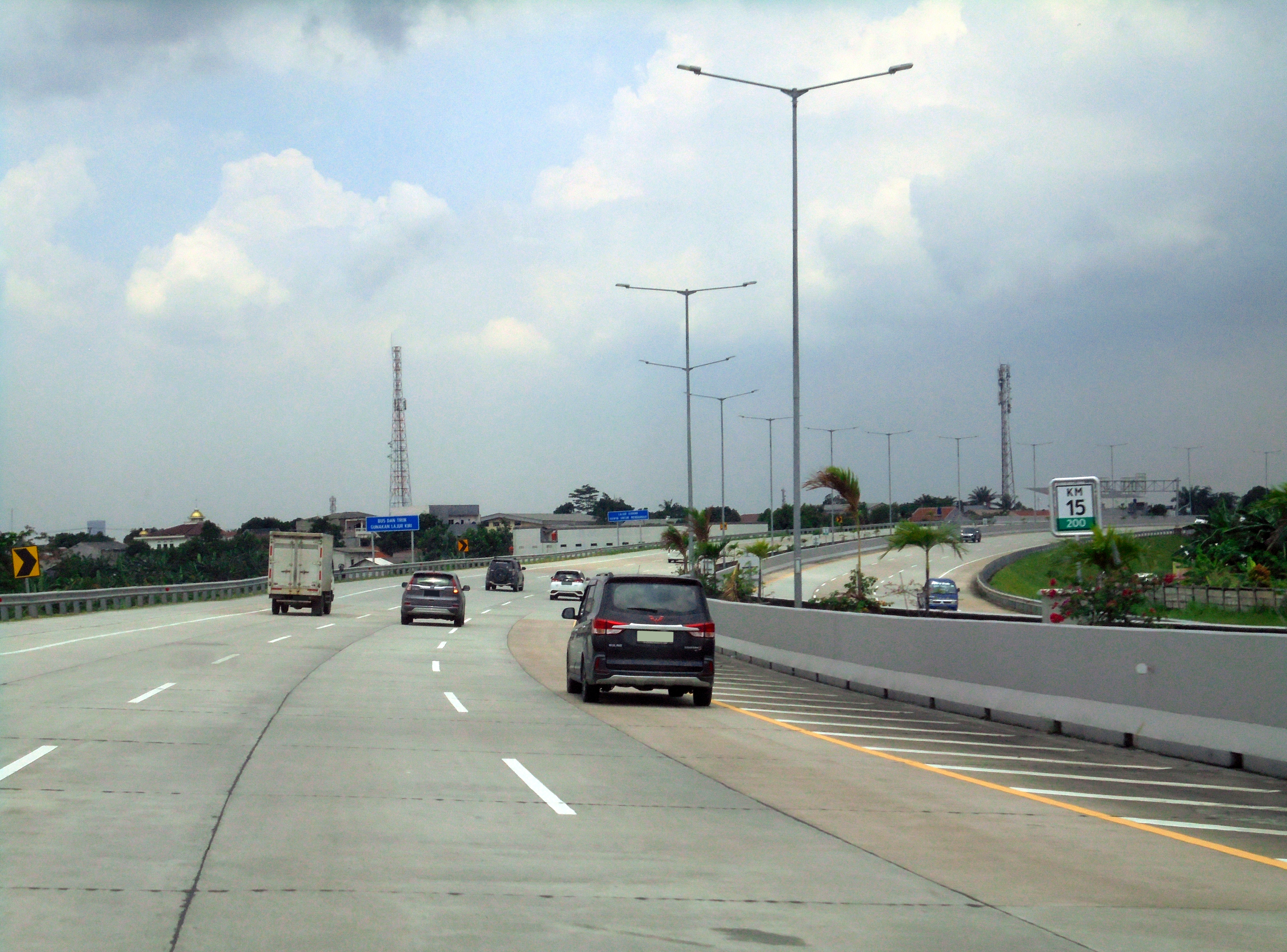
- Southbound Kunciran–Serpong Toll Road heading to Serpong, South Tangerang in 2023

Route information
- Maintained by: PT Jasamarga Kunciran Cengkareng (JKC); PT Marga Trans Nusantara (MTN); PT Cinere Serpong Jaya (CSJ); PT Trans Lingkar Kita Jaya (TLKJ); PT Cimanggis Cibitung Tollways (CCT); PT Cibitung Tanjung Priok Port Tollways (CTP)
- Length: 110.4 km (68.6 mi)
- Existed: 2012–present

Major junctions
- Beltway around Jakarta Metropolitan Area
- Northwest end: Soekarno–Hatta International Airport
- AH2 – Jakarta–Tangerang Toll Road; Jakarta–Serpong Toll Road; Depok–Antasari Toll Road; Jagorawi Toll Road; AH2 – Jakarta–Cikampek Toll Road
- Northeast end: Cilincing

Location
- Country: Indonesia
- Provinces: Banten, West Java, DKI Jakarta
- Major cities: Tangerang, South Tangerang, Depok, Bekasi, Bekasi Regency, North Jakarta

Highway system
- Transport in Indonesia

Jakarta Outer Ring Road 2 (Indonesian: Jalan Tol Lingkar Luar Jakarta 2) or JORR 2 is a controlled-access toll road circling the Greater Jakarta area, running roughly parallel with the Jakarta Outer Ring Road (JORR 1) in Indonesia. This toll road connects Soekarno-Hatta International Airport to Cilincing, crossing Tangerang, South Tangerang, Depok, Bekasi, Bekasi Regency. and North Jakarta. It is expected to be able to relieve the traffic of other toll roads in the Greater Jakarta area.

The length of this toll road is 110 kilometres (68 mi) which is divided into seven sections, being Cengkareng-Kunciran (14.9 km [9.3 mi]), Kunciran-Serpong (11.19 km [6.95 mi]), Serpong-Cinere (10.14 km [6.30 mi]), Cinere-Jagorawi-Cimanggis (14.64 km [9.10 mi]), Cimanggis-Cibitung (25.39 km [15.78 mi]), Cibitung-Cilincing (34 km [21 mi]), and access to Tanjung Priok (16.7 km [10.4 mi]).

== Sections ==
JORR 2 is divided into several sections:

Section	Length	Main Concession by	Status
Cengkareng-Batu Ceper-Kunciran	14.1 km	PT Jasamarga Kunciran Cengkareng (Jasa Marga, CMS Works, Wijaya Karya, Nindya Karya, Istaka Karya)	Opened
Kunciran–Serpong	11.2 km	PT Marga Trans Nusantara (Jasa Marga and Astra Infra)	Opened.
Serpong–Cinere (BSD-Depok)	10.1 km	PT Cinere Serpong Jaya (Jasa Marga, Waskita Karya, Jakpro)	Opened.
Cinere-Jagorawi	14.6 km	PT Translingkar Kita Jaya (Kompas Gramedia Group and Jasa Marga)	Opened,
Cimanggis-Cibitung	26 km	PT Cimanggis Cibitung Tollways	Opened
Cibitung-Cilincing	34 km	PT Cibitung Tanjung Priok Port Tollways	Opened

== Interchanges ==
KM	Location	Border with	Destination
0	Benda	Prof. Dr. Ir. Soedijatmo Toll Road	Soekarno–Hatta International Airport (west); Pluit-Grogol-Jakarta Inner Ring Road (east)
14	Kunciran	Jakarta–Tangerang Toll Road	Tangerang–Karawaci–Tangerang–Merak Toll Road (west); Kembangan–Kebon Jeruk-Tomang-Jakarta Inner Ring Road (east)
25	Serpong	Jakarta–Serpong Toll Road	Serpong–Balaraja Toll Road (Planned) (west); Pondok Aren–Bintaro-Jakarta–Serpong Toll Road (east)
38	Krukut	Depok–Antasari Toll Road	Antasari–Jakarta Outer Ring Road (north); Depok (south)
50	Cimanggis	Jagorawi Toll Road	Cibubur–Cawang–Jakarta Inner Ring Road–Tanjung Priok (north); Jagorawi Toll Road–Sentul–Bogor Ring Road (south)
76 (0)	Cibitung	Jakarta–Cikampek Toll Road	Bekasi–Jakarta Inner Ring Road–Jakarta (west); Jakarta–Cikampek Toll Road–Cikarang–Padaleunyi Toll Road (east)
110 (34)	Cilincing	Jakarta Outer Ring Road	Cikunir–Pondok Pinang (south)

== See also ==
- Jakarta Inner Ring Road
- Jakarta Outer Ring Road
- Jakarta Elevated Toll Road
- Transport in Indonesia
