= Joglo, Kembangan =

Joglo
- Interactive map of Joglo
- Country: Indonesia
- Province: DKI Jakarta
- Administrative city: West Jakarta
- District: Kembangan

Area
  - Total: 4.85 km^{2} (1.87 sq mi)

Population
  - Total: 48,718
  - Density: 10,000/km^{2} (26,000/sq mi)
- Postal code: 11640

Joglo is an administrative village in the Kembangan district, city of West Jakarta, Indonesia. It has postal code of 11640. As of 2010, the population was 43,499.

== See also ==
- Kembangan
- List of administrative villages of Jakarta
