= Pondok Aren =

Coordinates: 6°16′52″S 106°42′07″E

- Town and District
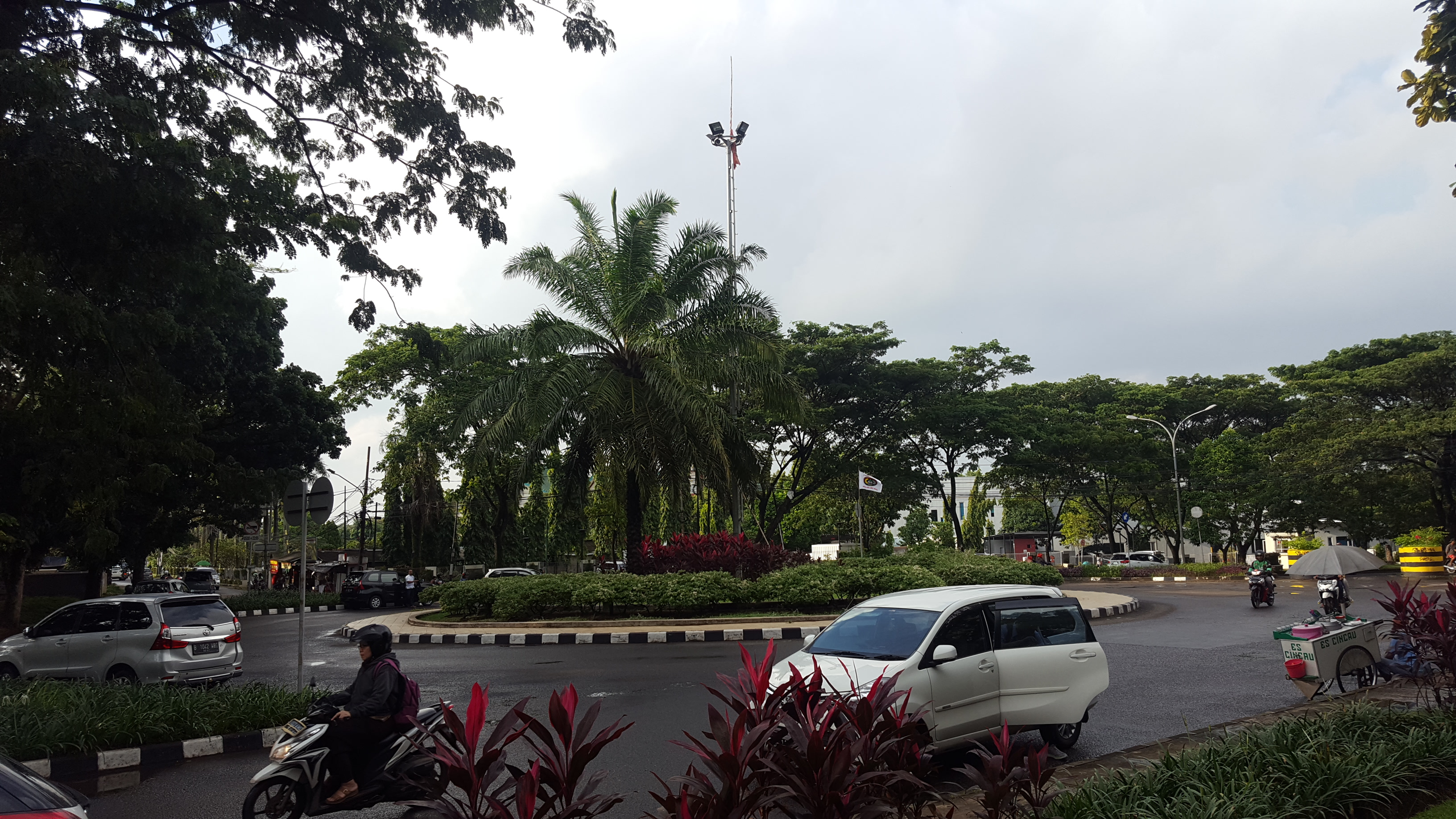
- Roundabout at Perigi, Pondok Aren
- Interactive map of Pondok Aren
- Country: Indonesia
- Province: Banten
- City: South Tangerang

Area
  - Total: 29.80 km^{2} (11.51 sq mi)

Population (mid 2023 estimate)
  - Total: 295,812
  - Density: 9,927/km^{2} (25,710/sq mi)

Pondok Aren (often abbreviated as Pd Aren) is a town and an administrative district (kecamatan) in the city of South Tangerang, in Banten Province on Java, Indonesia. It is located on the south-western outskirts of Jakarta. The district covers 29.80 km^{2} and had a population of 303,093 at the 2010 Census and 294,996 at the 2020 Census; the official estimate as of mid-2023 was 295,812.

== Communities ==
Pondok Aren District is sub-divided into eleven urban communities (kelurahan), listed below with their areas and their officially-estimated populations as of mid-2021, together with their postcodes.

Kode Wilayah	Name of kelurahan	Area in km^{2}	Population mid 2021 estimate	Post code
36.74.03.1001	Pondok Betung	1.98	33,326	15221
36.74.03.1002	Pondok Pucung	3.00	27,327	15229
36.74.03.1003	Pondok Karya	2.78	26,226	15225
36.74.03.1004	Pondok Jaya	2.39	10,803	15220
36.74.03.1005	Pondok Aren (town)	2.24	31,217	15224
36.74.03.1006	Pondok Kacang Barat	2.58	23,659	15226
36.74.03.1007	Pondok Kacang Timur	2.59	37,157	15226
36.74.03.1008	Perigi (Perigi Lama)	3.94	20,955	15227
36.74.03.1009	Perigi Baru	3.15	12,452	15228
36.74.03.1010	Jurang Manggu Barat	2.59	37,149	15223
36.74.03.1011	Jurang Manggu Timur	2.65	30,494	15222
36.74.03	Totals	29.89	290,765 ^{(a)}	

Notes: (a) comprising 145,222 males and 145,543 females.

Pondok Aren District covers most of the area of Bintaro Jaya and borders South Jakarta to the east. Pondok Aren District office is located at Jl. Graha Raya Bintaro, Perigi Baru behind the Pondok Aren Sectoral Police office (Polsek Pondok Aren).

Sectors 3-9 housing of Bintaro Jaya real estate lies within this district, while sectors 1-2 of Bintaro Jaya are partly located in South Jakarta and in East Ciputat District.

== Infrastructures ==
=== International Education ===
The British School Jakarta, The Jakarta Japanese School (ジャカルタ日本人学校), Global Jaya International School, and Mentari Intercultural School is located at this district.

There are also other national and public schools in this district.

=== Hospitals ===
- Pondok Indah Bintaro Jaya hospital
- Premier Bintaro Hospital
- Ihsan Medical Center
- Mitra Keluarga hospital
- RSIA Bina Medika Bintaro

=== Shopping Mall ===
- Bintaro Jaya Xchange Mall
- Transpark Mall Bintaro
- Bintaro Plaza

=== Police ===
- POLSEK PONDOK AREN, is the district police of Pondok Aren which covers Bintaro Jaya sector 3–9. The police office is located at Jl. Graha Raya Bintaro, Perigi Baru.
  - POLSUBSEKTOR BINTARO 5, is a police station located at Jl. Bintaro Utama 5, Bintaro Jaya sector 5.

=== Fire and rescue ===
The South Tangerang Fire and Rescue service covers this area. A fire station is available for Pondok Aren district which is located beside the Bintaro Plaza.

== Access ==
Ulujami-Serpong Toll Road (Exit Pondok Aren at KM 5-6) And Kunciran–Serpong Toll Road (Jakarta Outer Ring Road 2) (on the Perigi exit at KM 21) Pondok Aren is strategic with 2 toll roads

Connecting BSD City Serpong, Bintaro, Ulujami, Pondok Indah, Jakarta, Jagorawi, Jakarta - Cikampek, Sheikh Mohammad Bin Zayed Elevated Toll Road In Jakarta - Cikampek

For Ulujami Serpong and JORR 1 toll roads

For JORR 2 Toll Road connecting Soekarno Hatta International Airport, Tangerang, Jakarta-Merak Toll Road, Perigi, Serpong, Pamulang, Depok, Jagorawi, Cikampek

== Transportation ==
=== Transport Bus And Angkot ===
- Trans Bintaro Jaya bus to FX Sudirman mall
- RoyalTrans by Transjakarta (Bintaro Jaya Xchange - Fatmawati MRT Station)
- Angkot C05 to Kebayoran Lama (via Ulujami - Bintaro Permai)
- Angkot C12 to Kebayoran Lama (via Cipadu)
- Angkot S06 to Kebayoran Lama (via Taman Puring - Ulujami - Bintaro Permai)
- Angkot D10 to Ciputat
- Angkot C02 Ciputat-Ciledug via Pondok Aren - Jombang
- Angkot C11 BSD-Ciledug via Parigi - Pondok Kacang Timur

=== Rail Based Transport ===
- Commuter Line Rangkasbitung Rangkasbitung Line
- MRT Jakarta (Future) North South Line Extension Lebak Bulus - Serpong Via Pondok Aren
