= Alam Sutera =

Planned township in Greater Jakarta, Indonesia

- Planned township
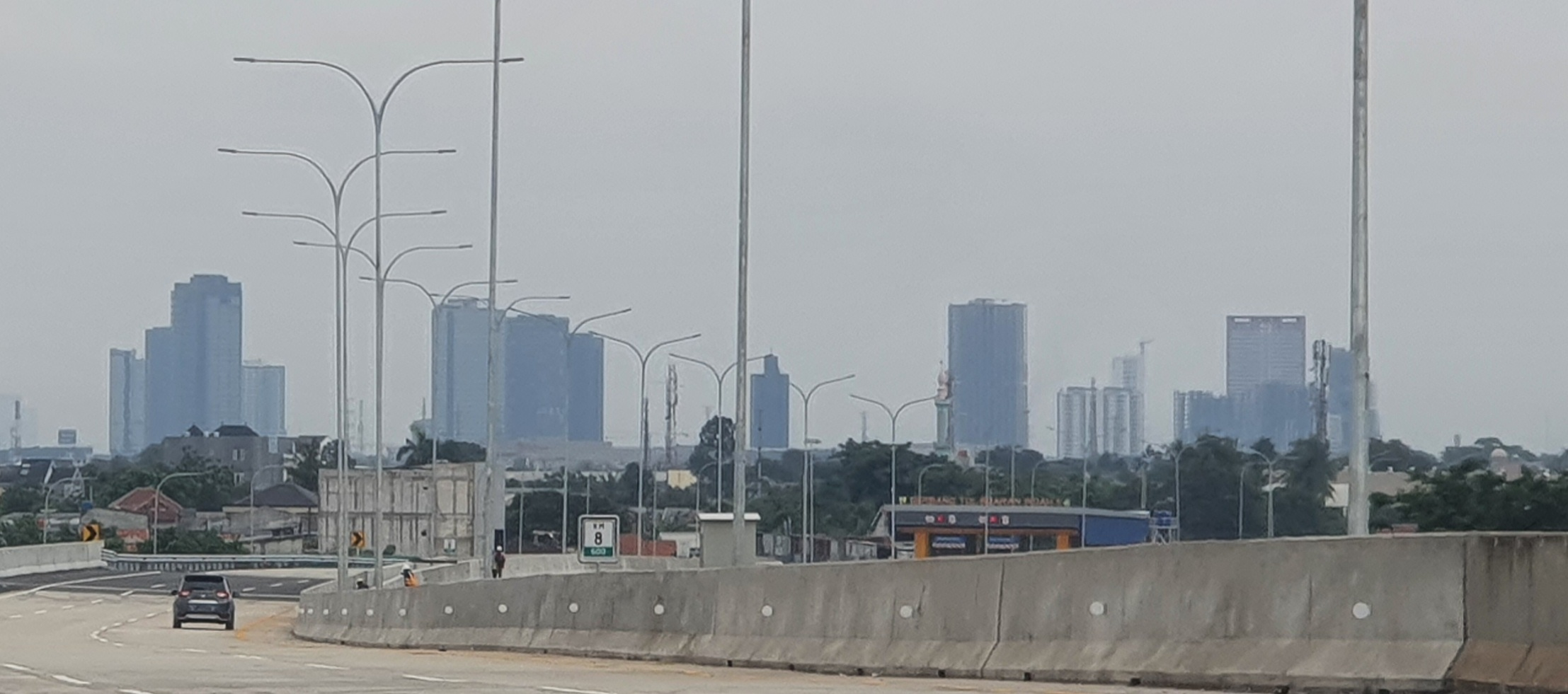
- Alam Sutera CBD viewed from Kunciran–Serpong Toll Road
- Interactive map of Alam Sutera
- Coordinates: 6°14′35″S 106°39′8″E
- Location: Banten, Indonesia
- Managing entity: PT Alam Sutera Realty Tbk
- Established: 1994

Area
  - Total: 800 ha (2,000 acres)
- Website: www.alam-sutera.com

Alam Sutera is a mixed township at South Tangerang City and Tangerang City of Banten province in Indonesia. It is located south-west of capital Jakarta and within Jabodetabek metro area. The township has a land area of about 800 hectares. Most of the area are located in North Serpong, South Tangerang City, while some area, especially the CBD, are in Pinang sub-district, Tangerang City. It is generally suited for upper middle income household along with many other satellite cities in the province.

== Facilities ==
- BINUS University @ Alam Sutera
- St. Laurensius Catholic Church
- Santa Laurensia School
- Nur Asmaul Husna Mosque
- EMC Hospital Alam Sutera
- Pasar 8 Alam Sutera
- The Flavor Bliss & Broadway
- IKEA Alam Sutera
- Decathlon Alam Sutera
- Mall @ Alam Sutera
- Living World Alam Sutera
- Jakarta Premium Outlets
- Mercure Serpong Alam Sutera
- Hotel Tentrem Jakarta

== Transportation ==
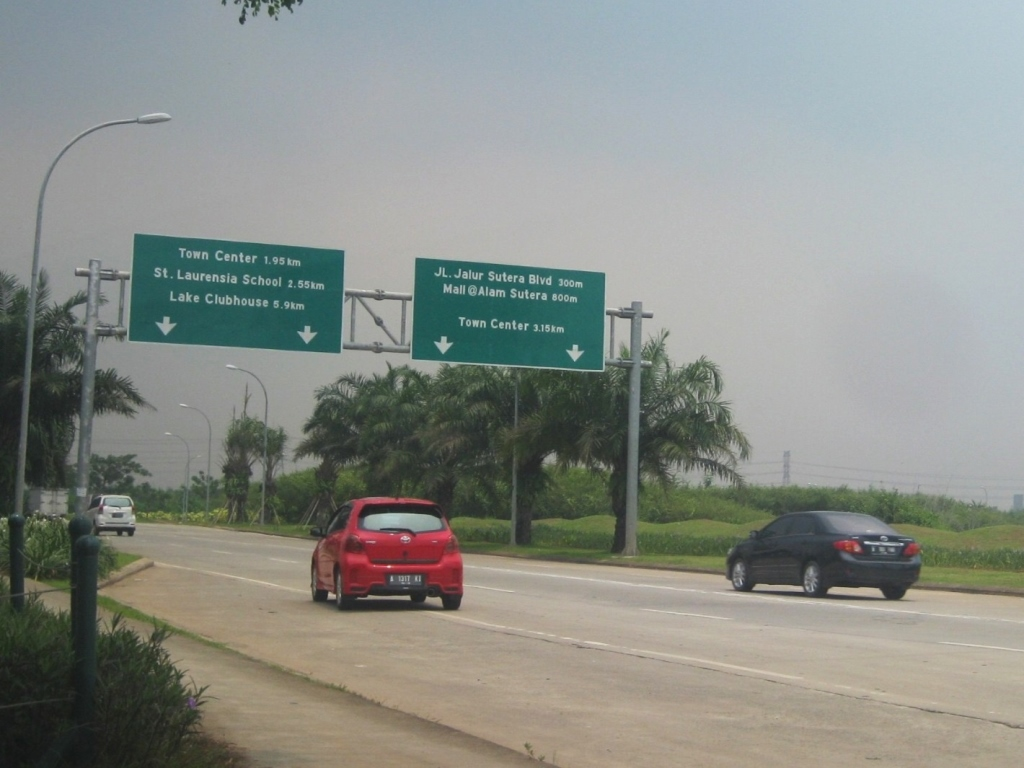
The main road in Alam Sutera.

Alam Sutera has direct access to Jakarta–Merak Toll Road, Bintaro Jaya and Jl. Raya Serpong. Transjakarta operates one feeder route to directly connect the township with Jakarta city center, namely route S61 (Alam Sutera–Blok M) that terminates at the Flavor Bliss & Broadway. The township has an internal shuttle bus service, known as "SuteraLoop", which services Alam Sutera proper. It connects all areas in Alam Sutera including residential and commercial areas as well.

In the future, Alam Sutera will be connected with the Jakarta MRT East–West Line plan connecting Cikarang in the east with Balaraja in the west.

== See also ==
- Tangerang Regency
- Jakarta metropolitan area
- Banten
