= Tomang =

- Administrative village
- Interactive map of Tomang
- Coordinates: 6°10′19″S 106°47′49″E
- Country: Indonesia
- Province: Jakarta
- City: West Jakarta
- District: Grogol Petamburan
- Postal code: 11440

Tomang is an administrative village in the Grogol Petamburan district of Indonesia. It has postal code of 11440.

== See also ==
- Grogol Petamburan
- List of administrative villages of Jakarta
