= Ciputat =

Coordinates: 6°18′40″S 106°45′43″E

- Town and District
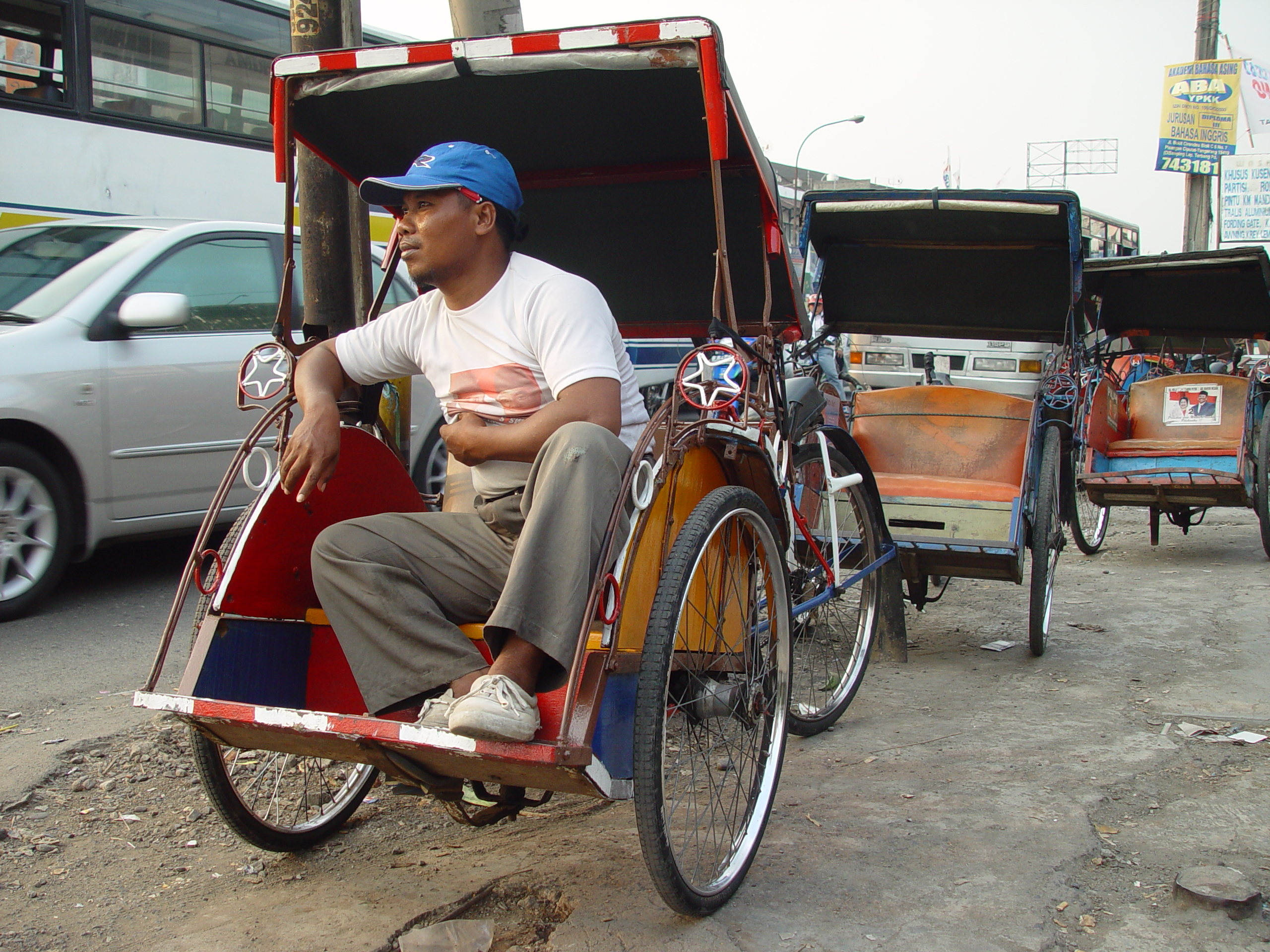
- Becak and driver, Ciputat, South Tangerang, Indonesia.
- Interactive map of Ciputat
- Country: Indonesia
- Province: Banten
- Municipality: South Tangerang City

Area
  - Total: 21.11 km^{2} (8.15 sq mi)

Population (mid 2023 estimate)
  - Total: 222,186
  - Density: 10,530/km^{2} (27,260/sq mi)

Ciputat is a town and an administrative district (kecamatan) in the city of South Tangerang, in Banten Province on Java, Indonesia and is inside the Greater Jakarta metropolitan area. It covers an area of 21.11 km^{2} and had a population of 192,205 at the 2010 Census and 202,722 at the 2020 Census; the official estimate as of mid-2023 was 222,186.

== Communities ==
Ciputat District is sub-divided into seven urban communities (kelurahan), listed below with their areas and their officially-estimated populations as of mid-2022, together with their postcodes.

Kode Wilayah	Name of kelurahan	Area in km^{2}	Population mid 2022 estimate	Post code
36.74.04.1001	Sawah Baru	2.74	28,912	15413
36.74.04.1002	Sarua	3.68	40,935	15414
36.74.04.1003	Ciputat (town)	1.72	24,936	15411
36.74.04.1004	Sawah (Sawah Lama)	2.49	32,179	15413
36.74.04.1005	Sarua Indah	1.93	21,009	15414
36.74.04.1006	Jombang	3.45	42,914	15414
36.74.04.1007	Cipayung	2.37	26,296	15411
36.74.04	Totals	18.38	217,181 ^{(a)}	

Notes: (a) comprising 108,708 males and 108,473 females.

== Education ==
- Syarif Hidayatullah State Islamic University Jakarta

== Transportation ==
=== Citybus Transjakarta ===
- Transjakarta S21 Ciputat - Kejaksaan Agung
- Transjakarta S22 Ciputat - Kp Rambutan

=== KRL Commuter Line ===
- Rangkasbitung Line Rangkasbitung - Tanah Abang

=== MRT Jakarta ===
- MRT Jakarta Lebak Bulus - Bundaran HI
- MRT Jakarta (Future Planned) Lebak Bulus - Pamulang

=== Aceess Toll Road ===
- Jakarta-Serpong Toll Road Ulujami - Rawa Buntu

Exit Tol KM 7-8 In Bintaro

- Jakarta Outer Ring Road 2 Exit Tol Pamulang

== See also ==
- South Tangerang
- East Ciputat
- Jakarta metropolitan area
