= Karawaci, Tangerang =

Town and district in Tangerang, Banten, Indonesia

Karawaci
- Town and district
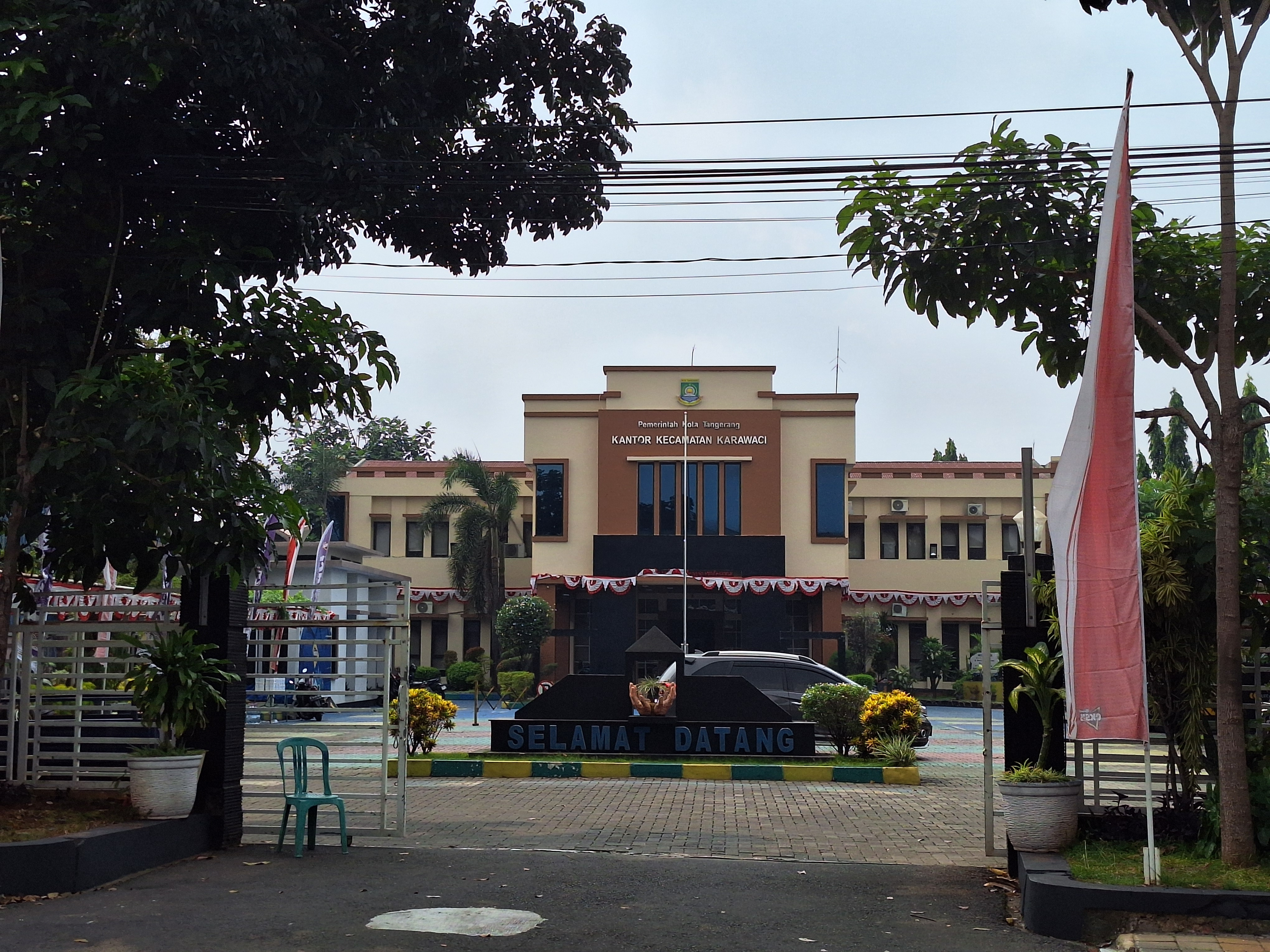
- Karawaci regent office (2024)
- Interactive map of Karawaci
- Coordinates: 6°10′54″S 106°37′00″E
- Country: Indonesia
- Province: Banten
- Municipality: Tangerang City

Area
  - Total: 13.48 km^{2} (5.20 sq mi)

Population (mid 2023 estimate)
  - Total: 193,480
  - Density: 14,350/km^{2} (37,170/sq mi)

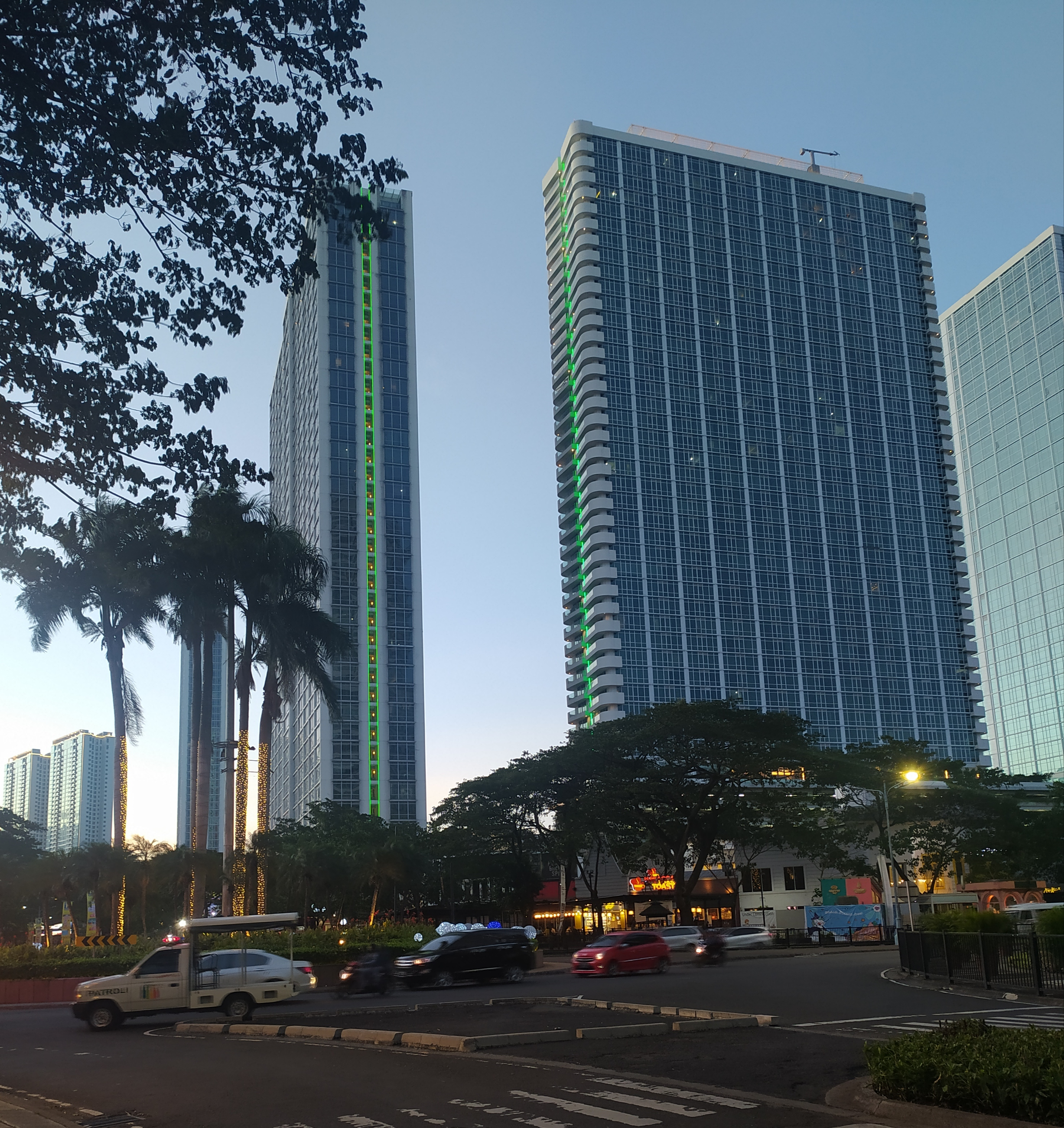
Office and apartment towers in Karawaci, Tangerang

Karawaci is a town and an administrative district (kecamatan) of Tangerang City, in Banten Province of Indonesia, on the island of Java. The district covers an area of 13.48 km^{2}, and had a population of 171,317 at the 2010 Census and 184,388 at the 2020 Census; the official estimate as at mid 2023 was 193,480. Lippo Karawaci, a planned community, is located here.

This district formed part of the particuliere landerij, or private domain, of the Oey family of Karawatji, part of the 'Cabang Atas' landowning gentry of colonial Java. Oey Djie San, head of the family at the turn of the century, served as Kapitein der Chinezen of Tangerang.

== Communities ==
Karawaci District is sub-divided into sixteen urban communities (kelurahan), listed below with their areas and their officially-estimated populations as at mid 2022, together with their postcodes.

Kode Wilayah	Name of kelurahan	Area in km^{2}	Population mid 2022 estimate	Post code
36.71.07.1001	Karawaci (town)	1.65	7,750	15115
36.71.07.1002	Bojongjaya	1.56	9,003	15115
36.71.07.1003	Karawaci Baru	0.58	15,909	15116
36.71.07.1004	Nusajaya	1.17	15,700	15116
36.71.07.1005	Cimone	1.22	19,525	15114
36.71.07.1006	Cimone Jaya	0.89	15,376	15116
36.71.07.1007	Pabuaran	0.80	11,358	15114
36.71.07.1008	Sumur Pacing	0.41	6,270	15114
36.71.07.1009	Bugel	0.82	16,052	15113
36.71.07.1010	Margasari	1.05	18,041	15113
36.71.07.1011	Pabuaran Tumpeng	0.69	14,550	15112
36.71.07.1012	Nambojaya	0.60	8,105	15112
36.71.07.1013	Gerendeng	0.64	11,017	15113
36.71.07.1014	Sukajadi	0.57	8,792	15113
36.71.07.1015	Pasarbaru	0.60	5,553	15112
36.71.07.1016	Koangjaya	0.16	9,618	15112
36.71.07	Totals	13.41	192,619 ^{(a)}	

Notes: (a) comprising 96,869 males and 95,750 females.

== Notable companies ==
- Lippo Karawaci
