= Jalan Jenderal Ahmad Yani =

Road in Jakarta, Indonesia

- Jalan Jend. A. Yani
- Owner: Pemprov DKI Jakarta
- Maintained by: Dinas Pekerjaan Umum DKI Jakarta
- Length: 6.0 km (3.7 mi)
- Location: Jakarta, Indonesia
- From: Sunter, Central Jakarta
- To: Pisangan Baru, Matraman, East Jakarta

Jalan Jenderal Ahmad Yani or Jalan Jend. A. Yani is one of the main roads of Jakarta, Indonesia. The road is named after an Indonesian National Hero General Ahmad Yani. The road was built as a bypass to connect Tanjung Priok harbour with Halim Perdanakusuma Airport in 1960s. This road extends along 6.0 km from Sunter, Central Jakarta to Pisangan Baru, Matraman, East Jakarta . This road is traversed by Jakarta Inner Ring Road and TransJakarta corridor 10. This road crosses 11 urban villages of Central Jakarta, North Jakarta, and East Jakarta, namely:

- Cempaka Putih Timur, Cempaka Putih, Central Jakarta
- Sumur Batu, Kemayoran, Central Jakarta
- West Kelapa Gading, Kelapa Gading, North Jakarta
- Rawasari, Cempaka Putih, Central Jakarta
- Pisangan Baru, Matraman, East Jakarta
- Kayu Putih, Pulo Gadung, East Jakarta
- Rawamangun, Pulo Gadung, East Jakarta
- Utan Kayu Selatan, Matraman, East Jakarta
- Utan Kayu Utara, Matraman, East Jakarta
- Kayu Manis, Matraman, East Jakarta
- East Pisangan, Pulo Gadung, East Jakarta

== Transportation ==
This road is passed by TransJakarta corridor 10. It is also served by APTB, Mayasari Bakti and Kopaja buses.

== See also ==
- History of Jakarta
