= Cengkareng–Batu Ceper–Kunciran Toll Road =

Toll Road in Indonesia

Cengkareng-Batu Ceper-Kunciran Toll Road
- CBK Toll Road
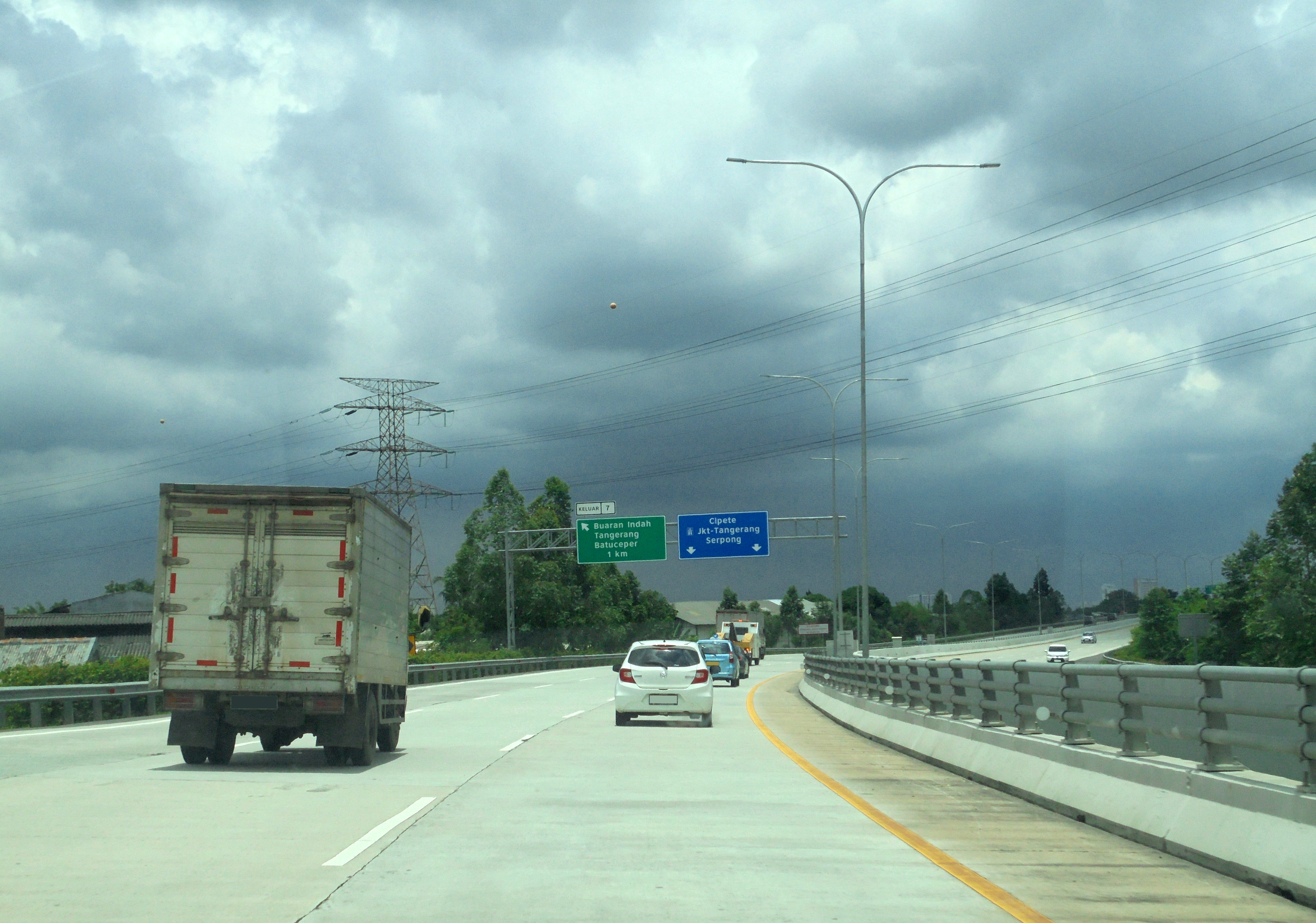
- Southbound Cengkareng–Batu Ceper–Kunciran Toll Road heading to Kunciran, Tangerang in 2023

Route information
- Maintained by PT Jasamarga Kunciran Cengkareng (JKC)
- Length: 14.19 km (8.82 mi)
- Existed: 1 April 2021–present

Major junctions
- North end: Benda Interchange
- Prof. Dr. Ir. Soedijatmo Toll Road; AH2 – Jakarta–Tangerang Toll Road; Kunciran–Serpong Toll Road
- South end: Kunciran Interchange

Location
- Country: Indonesia
- Provinces: Banten
- Major cities: Tangerang

Highway system
- Transport in Indonesia

Cengkareng-Batu Ceper-Kunciran Toll Road (CBK Toll Road) is a toll road, which runs from Cengkareng to Kunciran in Greater Jakarta, Indonesia. This toll road is part of the Jakarta Outer Ring Road 2 network that will connect Soekarno-Hatta International Airport to Cilincing. The toll road will be connected to the Jakarta-Tangerang Toll Road, Kunciran-Serpong Toll Road, as well as Prof. Dr. Ir. Soedijatmo Toll Road.

== History ==
Cengkareng-Batu Ceper-Kunciran is 14.19 kilometers long, consisting of 4 work sections. The four sections are, section 1 Kunciran – IC of Sultan Ageng Tirtayasa for 2.04 km, section 2 IC of Sultan Ageng Tirtayasa – on / off ramp of Benteng Betawi along 3.50 km. Then section 3 is the on / off ramp of Benteng Betawi – IC Husein Sastranegara along 6.50 km, and section 4 IC Husein Sastranegara – Benda Junction along 2.15 km. The toll road was expected to be operational by 2019. The toll road was inaugurated in 1 April 2021 along with the first section of Serpong–Cinere Toll Road.

== Toll gates ==
| Province | Location | km | mi | Exit | Name | Destinations | Notes |
|---|---|---|---|---|---|---|---|
| Banten | Benda, Tangerang | 0.0 | 0.0 | 0 | Benda Interchange | Westbound; Soekarno-Hatta International Airport; Eastbound; Prof. Dr. Ir. Soedijatmo Toll Road; Kapuk; Cawang | Northern terminus |
| Banten | Benda, Tangerang | 2.1 | 1.3 | 2 | Benda Ramp | Benda; Pajang; Rawa Bokor | North-bound exit & South-bound entry only |
| Banten | Benda, Tangerang | 2.2 | 1.4 | Benda Utama Toll Gate | | | |
| Banten | Tangerang, Tangerang | 7.6 | 4.7 | 7 | Tanah Tinggi Toll Gate | Buaran Indah; Tangerang; Batuceper | South-bound exit & North-bound entry only |
| Banten | Tangerang, Tangerang | 9.5 | 5.9 | 9 | Buaran Indah Toll Gate | Buaran Indah; Tangerang; Batuceper | South-bound entry & North-bound exit only |
| Banten | Pinang, Tangerang | 11.8 | 7.3 | 11 | Pinang Toll Gate | Cipete; Cikokol; Ciledug | |
| Banten | Pinang, Tangerang | 13.4 | 8.3 | 13 | Kunciran Interchange | Jakarta–Tangerang Toll Road; Eastbound; Karangtengah; Jakarta Outer Ring Road; Jakarta Inner Ring Road; Westbound; Tangerang; Karawaci; Tangerang–Merak Toll Road | Southern terminus |
| Banten | Pinang, Tangerang | 14.6 | 9.1 | Kunciran–Serpong Toll Road | | | |
| Banten | 1.000 mi = 1.609 km; 1.000 km = 0.621 mi: Electronic toll collection; Route transition | | | | | | |

== See also ==
- Trans-Java toll road
