= Cinere–Serpong Toll Road =

Toll Road in Indonesia

- Sercin Toll Road

Route information
- Maintained by PT Cinere Serpong Jaya (CSJ)
- Length: 10.1 km (6.3 mi)
- Existed: 1 April 2021–present

Major junctions
- Northwest end: Serpong Interchange
- Kunciran–Serpong Toll Road; Cinere–Jagorawi Toll Road
- Southeast end: Cinere

Location
- Country: Indonesia
- Provinces: Banten; West Java
- Major cities: South Tangerang; Depok

Highway system
- Transport in Indonesia

Cinere–Serpong Toll Road (Sercin) is one of the toll roads which are part of the Jakarta Outer Ring Road 2 which connects the Kunciran–Serpong Toll Road in the west and the Cinere–Jagorawi Toll Road in the east. This toll road that connects South Tangerang with Depok, crosses several areas, such as Jombang, Ciputat, Pamulang, Pondok Cabe and Cinere. The toll road is managed by PT Cinere Serpong Jaya (CSJ), the majority of whose shares are owned by PT Jasa Marga.

== History ==
The toll road project was initiated in 2006, but the construction of the project was halted and delayed due to land acquisition issue, which again restarted in September 2017 after being halted for approximately eight years. The toll road was previously expected to be operational in 2019, however, the first section was inaugurated in 1 April 2021 along with Cengkareng–Batu Ceper–Kunciran Toll Road. While the second section is currently undergoing land acquisition phase which will be used to connect this toll road with Cinere–Jagorawi Toll Road, this section is expected to be operational in 22 December 2023. On 22 December 2023, the entirety of the toll road has been inaugurated.

== Sections ==
This toll road is divided into two sections:

- Section 1 is 6.67 kilometres (4.14 mi) from Serpong to Pamulang
- Section 2 is 3.64 kilometres (2.26 mi) from Pamulang to Cinere.

== Exits ==
Province	Location	km	mi	Exit	Name	Destinations	Notes
Banten	Ciputat, South Tangerang	24.6	15.3	Kunciran–Serpong Toll Road			
Banten	Ciputat, South Tangerang	25.7	16.0	25	Serpong Interchange	Jakarta–Serpong Toll Road; Westbound; Serpong; Serpong–Balaraja Toll Road; Eastbound; Pondok Aren; Jakarta Outer Ring Road	Northern terminus
Banten	Pamulang, South Tangerang	31.2	19.4	31	Pamulang Toll Gate	Ciputat; Pamulang; Pondok Cabe Airport	
West Java	Limo, Depok	35.6	22.1	35	Limo Toll Gate	Cinere; Lebak Bulus; Sawangan	
West Java	Limo, Depok	35.7	22.2	Limo Utama Toll Gate			
West Java	Limo, Depok	37.1	23.1	37	Limo Interchange	Depok–Antasari Toll Road; Northbound; Brigif; Andara; Jakarta Outer Ring Road; Southbound; Pancoran Mas; Depok	Southeastern terminus
West Java	Limo, Depok			Cinere–Jagorawi Toll Road			
1.000 mi = 1.609 km; 1.000 km = 0.621 mi: Electronic toll collection; Route transition

== See also ==
- Trans-Java toll road
