= Cibitung–Cilincing Toll Road =

Toll Road in Indonesia

Cibitung-Cilincing Toll Road
- Jalan Tol Cibitung-Cilincing
- JTCC

Route information
- Maintained by PT Cibitung Tanjung Priok Port Tollways (CTP)
- Length: 34 km (21 mi)
- Existed: 2021–present

Major junctions
- Southeast end: Cibitung
- AH2 – Jakarta–Cikampek Toll Road; Cimanggis–Cibitung Toll Road; Tanjung Priok Access Toll Road
- Northwest end: Cilincing

Location
- Country: Indonesia
- Provinces: West Java; DKI Jakarta
- Major cities: Bekasi Regency; North Jakarta

Highway system
- Transport in Indonesia

Cibitung-Cilincing Toll Road (Indonesian: Jalan Tol Cibitung-Cilincing (JTCC)) is a 34-kilometre-long (21 mi) toll road which extends from Cibitung, West Java, to Cilincing, Jakarta in Indonesia. This is one of the toll roads which are part of the Jakarta Outer Ring Road 2. This toll road is expected to reduce the burden of freight and vehicle transportation on the Jakarta–Cikampek Toll Road that crosses the Cawang area.

== History ==
The toll road consists of four sections. Construction of this toll road has been delayed by eight years due to land acquisition problems. The toll road was expected to be operational by 2019. The first section of the toll road has been operating since 31 July 2021, followed by the inaugurations of sections 2 and 3 on 20 September 2022.

== Sections ==
Section	Route	Length	Inauguration Date
Section 1	Cibitung–Telaga Asih	2.96 km (1.84 mi)	31 July 2021
Section 2	Telaga Asih–Tambelang	9.41 km (5.85 mi)	20 September 2022
Section 3	Tambelang–Mekarjaya	13.09 km (8.13 mi)	20 September 2022
Section 4	Mekarjaya–Cilincing	8.56 km (5.32 mi)	1 April 2023

== Exits ==
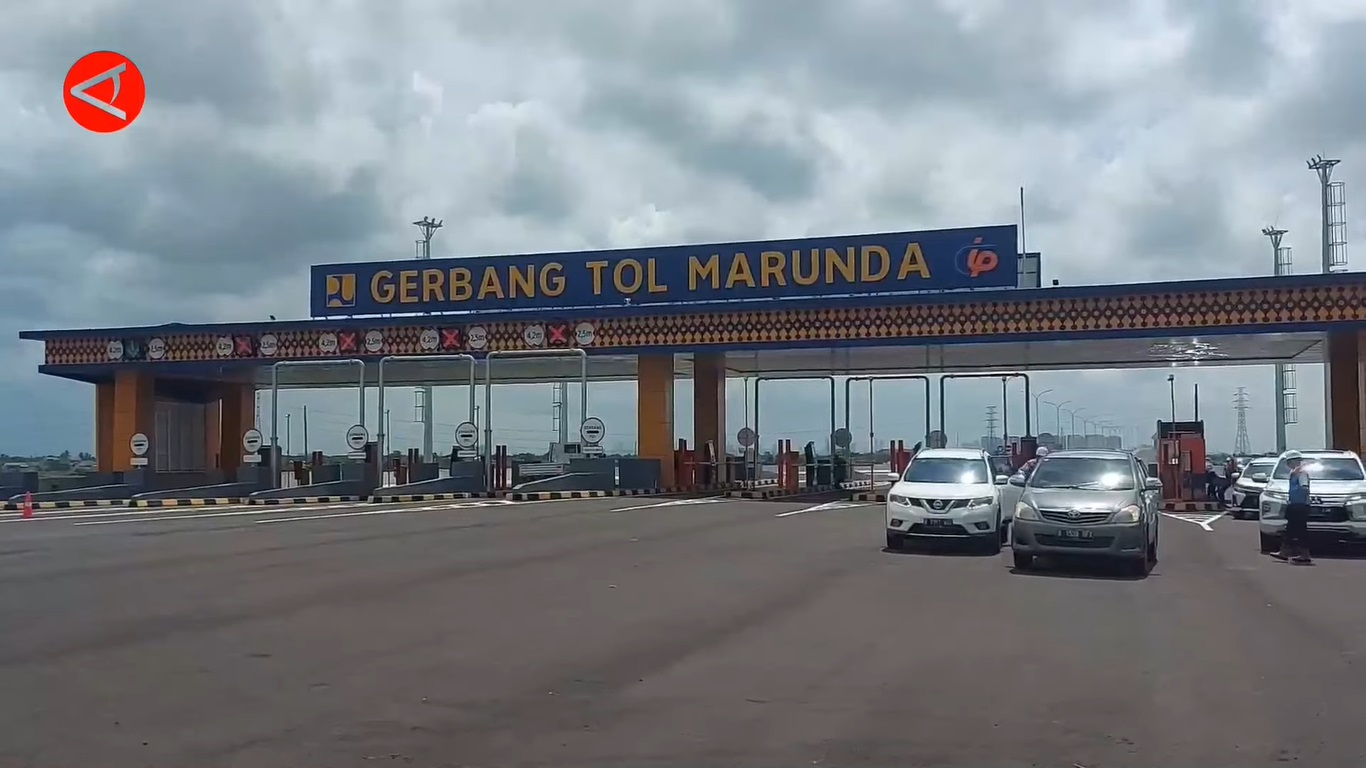
Marunda Toll Gate

Province	Location	km	mi	Exit	Name	Destinations	Notes
West Java	West Cikarang, Bekasi Regency	76	47	Cimanggis–Cibitung Toll Road			
West Java	West Cikarang, Bekasi Regency	76	47	76	Cibitung Interchange	Jakarta–Cikampek Toll Road; Eastbound; Cikarang; Cikampek; Bandung; Westbound; Tambun; Bekasi; Jakarta	
West Java	West Cikarang, Bekasi Regency	79	49	79	Telaga Asih Toll Gate	Cibitung; Telaga Asih	
West Java	North Tambun, Bekasi Regency	89	55	89	Gabus Toll Gate	North Tambun; Tambelang	Small vehicles only
West Java	Tarumajaya, Bekasi Regency	103	64	103	Tarumajaya Toll Gate	Tarumajaya; Babelan; Marunda	
West Java	Tarumajaya, Bekasi Regency	105	65	Marunda Toll Gate			
DKI Jakarta	Cilincing, North Jakarta	110	68	110	Semper Interchange	Jakarta Outer Ring Road; Northbound; Semper; Tanjung Priok Access Toll Road; Port of Tanjung Priok; Soekarno-Hatta International Airport; Southbound; Cakung; Bintara; Jagorawi Toll Road	
1.000 mi = 1.609 km; 1.000 km = 0.621 mi: Electronic toll collection; Route transition

== See also ==
- Trans-Java toll road
