= Puri Indah =

Neighborhood of Jakarta, Indonesia

Coordinates: 6.187951°S 106.733967°E

Puri Indah is a growing neighborhood at Kembangan, Jakarta, Indonesia. The area is in between South Kembangan and North Meruya administrative village of Kembangan district of West Jakarta. The area is located at the intersection of W1-W2 toll/expressway of the Jakarta Outer Ring Road.

The area is one of the rapidly growing neighborhoods which consists of business districts, apartment towers and shopping centers with other civic amenities. Because of its strategic location and close proximity to both Soekarno-Hatta International Airport and Port of Tanjung Priok, the area has already turned into a new central business district of Jakarta.

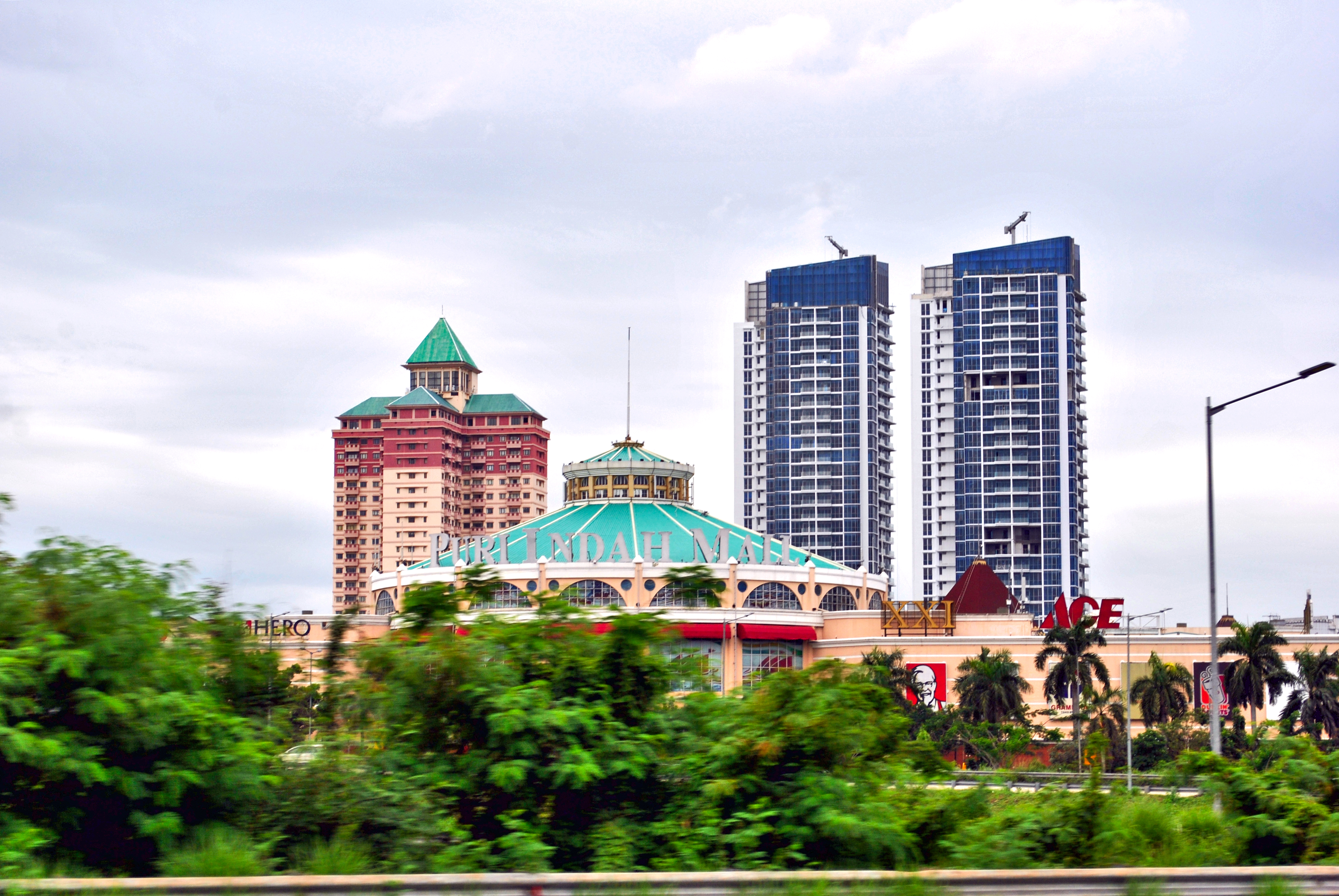
Puri Indah Mall and The Windsor Apartment Towers

== Block ==
Most of the renowned developers of Indonesia are constructing separate block developments within the area.

=== Puri Indah CBD ===
Puri Indah area is a 180-hectare (440-acre) CBD area that will consist of five-star hotels, apartments, suites office towers, convention & exhibition center, international hospital and luxury shopping malls. It is maintained by Pondok Indah Group for about 20 years.

=== St. Moritz ===
It is an integrated development of about 12 hectares (30 acres), which consists of six apartment towers, office Tower, five-star hotel (JW Marriot), two shopping centers, school, hospital, country club and convention center, which is developed by Lippo Group. The six apartment towers and Lippo Office Tower are integrated with Lippo Mall Puri.

=== Ciputra ===
A mixed development of about 7.5 hectares (19 acres) is being developed by PT Ciputra International. This super block consists of 10 towers of office, apartments and shopping mall.

== Important landmarks ==
- Lippo Mall Puri
- Px Pavilion
- Lippo Office Tower
- Puri Indah Mall
- Puri Indah Financial Tower
- Pondok Indah Puri Indah Hospital
- IPEKA School
- Springfield International School
- Notre Dame International School
- Masjid Assahara

== Transportation ==
=== Toll Road Access ===
Toll Road	Toll Gate	KM
Jakarta–Tangerang Toll Road	Meruya	06
Jakarta Outer Ring Road	Kembangan Utara	07

==== City Bus Transjakarta ====
- 3E Sentraland Cengkareng - Puri Indah Mall
- 1M Meruya - Blok M

== See also ==
- St. Moritz, Jakarta
