= Kembangan =

Kembangan may refer to:

- In Singapore
  - Kembangan, Singapore, a residential area within the district of Bedok
  - Kembangan MRT station, an MRT Station that serves the area
  - Kampong Kembangan Single Member Constituency, a former constituency that governed the area
- In Indonesia
  - Kembangan, Jakarta, a subdistrict of West Jakarta
  - North Kembangan, an administrative village (kelurahan) of Kembangan
  - South Kembangan, an administrative village of Kembangan
  - Kembangan railway station, a railway station in Kembangan
  - Kampung Kembangan, a name of several suburban areas
