= Cimanggis–Cibitung Toll Road =

Toll road in West Java, Indonesia

Cimanggis-Cibitung Toll Road
- Jalan Tol Cimanggis–Cibitung
- Cimaci Toll Road
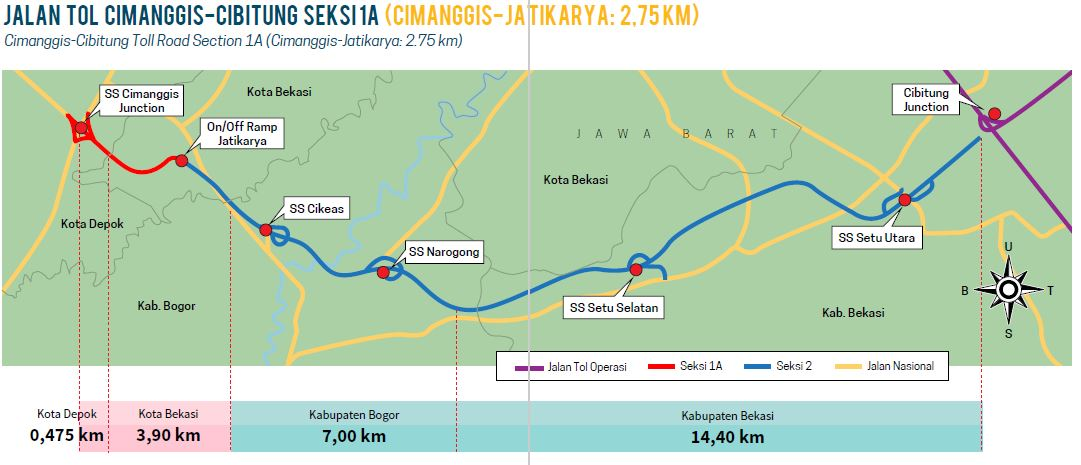

Route information
- Maintained by PT Cimanggis Cibitung Tollways (CCT)
- Length: 26 km (16 mi)
- Existed: 2020–present

Major junctions
- Southwest end: Cimanggis Interchange
- Jagorawi Toll Road; Cinere-Jagorawi Toll Road; AH2 – Jakarta-Cikampek Toll Road; Jakarta-Cikampek II South Toll Road; Cibitung–Cilincing Toll Road
- Northeast end: Cibitung Interchange

Location
- Country: Indonesia
- Provinces: West Java
- Major cities: Depok; Bekasi; Bogor Regency; Bekasi Regency

Highway system
- Transport in Indonesia

Cimanggis–Cibitung Toll Road (Cimaci) is a 25.39 kilometers long toll road which extends from Cimanggis to Cibitung in West Java, Indonesia. This is one of the toll roads which are part of the Jakarta Outer Ring Road 2. The toll road is expected to be able to break traffic density of two other toll roads of Greater Jakarta area, namely the Jakarta-Cikampek Toll Road and Jagorawi Toll Road.

== Sections ==
The toll road has 4 sections:

- Section 1 & 2 (Junction Cimanggis – Trans Yogie IC – Narogong IC), 8,75 Km.
- Section 3 & 4 (Narogong IC – Setu – Cibitung Junction).

Construction of this toll road was stalled since 2006, then started again in 2016. Section 1 of the toll road, which extends from Cimanggis to Transyogi has been operating since 2020, whereas the 2nd sections of the toll road has been operated 16 April 2023 and 10 July 2024.

== Exits ==
Province	Location	km	mi	Exit	Name	Destinations	Notes
West Java	Cimanggis, Depok	49.4	30.7	Cinere–Jagorawi Toll Road			
West Java	Tapos, Depok	50.4	31.3	50	Cimanggis Interchange	Jagorawi Toll Road; Southbound; Cimanggis; Gunung Putri; Bogor; Northbound; Cibubur; Jakarta Outer Ring Road; Cawang	
West Java	Jatisampurna, Bekasi	52.5	32.6	52	Jatikarya Toll Gate	Jatikarya; Jatisampurna; Cibubur	Northeastbound exit & Southwestbound entry only
West Java	Gunung Putri, Bogor Regency	56.1	34.9	56	Nagrak Toll Gate	Nagrak; Kota Wisata; Transyogi Road; Cibubur	
West Java	Cileungsi, Bogor Regency	59.3	36.8	59	Narogong Toll Gate	Narogong Industrial Complex; Cileungsi; Jonggol	
West Java	Setu, Bekasi Regency				Burangkeng Interchange	Jakarta-Cikampek II South Toll Road; Westbound; Bantar Gebang; Jatiasih; Jakarta Outer Ring Road; Eastbound; Taman Mekar; Kutanegara; Purwakarta	Under construction as of March 2024
West Java	Setu, Bekasi Regency	65.8	40.9	65	Setu Selatan Toll Gate	Setu; Burangkeng; Bekasi	
West Java	West Cikarang, Bekasi Regency	72.9	45.3	72	Setu Utara Toll Gate	MM2100 Industrial Complex; West Cikarang	
West Java	West Cikarang, Bekasi Regency				Cibitung Interchange	Jakarta–Cikampek Toll Road; Westbound; Tambun; Bekasi; Jakarta Outer Ring Road; Eastbound; Cikarang; Cibatu; Cikampek	
West Java	West Cikarang, Bekasi Regency			Cibitung–Cilincing Toll Road			
1.000 mi = 1.609 km; 1.000 km = 0.621 mi: Route transition; Unopened

== See also ==
- Trans-Java toll road
