= CitraLand Cibubur =

Coordinates: 6.409136°S 107.005637°E

CitraLand Cibubur is a township development at Cileungsi, Bogor, West Java within Jakarta metropolitan area in Indonesia. The township has a land area of about 220 hectares with facilities such as commercial areas, shopping malls, offices, fitness centers and others. The township is being developed by Ciputra Group with five clusters of residential area. The township also has a dedicated commercial area of 20 hectares for construction of shopping mall, office, shop houses, and hotel

== Transportation ==
The township can be accessed by Cimanggis-Cibitung Toll Road. The area will be connected to Greater Jakarta LRT.

== See also ==
- Jonggol
