= Prof. Dr. Ir. Soedijatmo Toll Road =

Toll road in Northern Jakarta, Indonesia

- Jalan Tol Prof. Dr. Ir. Soedijatmo
- Prof. Dr. Ir. Sedyatmo Toll Road
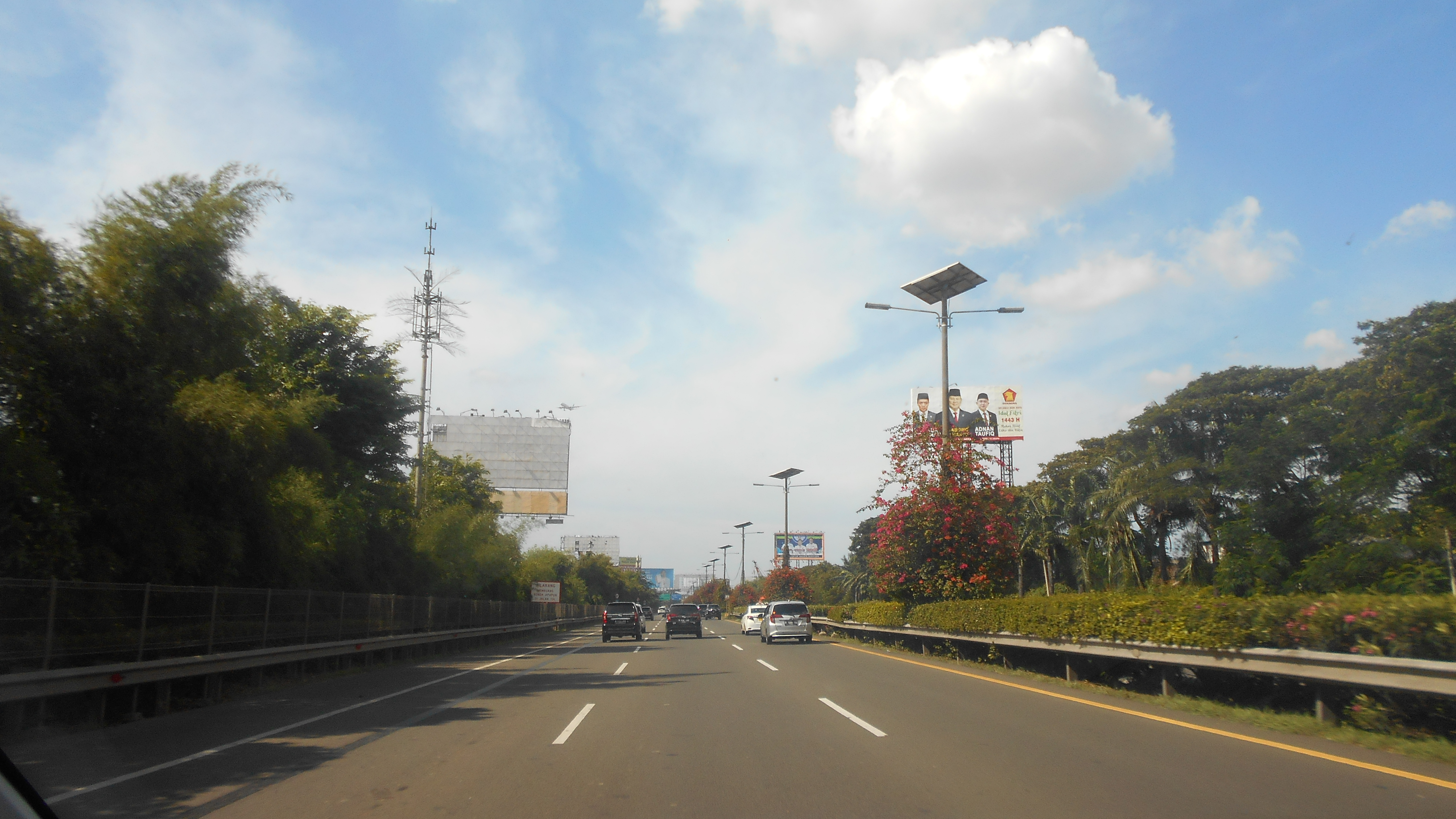
- Prof. Dr. Ir. Soedijatmo Toll Road in 2022.

Route information
- Maintained by Jasa Marga
- Length: 13.8 km (8.6 mi)
- Existed: 1 April 1985–present

Major junctions
- East end: Angke Interchange
- Jakarta Inner Ring Road; Jakarta Outer Ring Road; Kamal–Teluk Naga–Rajeg Toll Road; Cengkareng–Batu Ceper–Kunciran Toll Road (Jakarta Outer Ring Road 2)
- West end: Soekarno-Hatta International Airport

Location
- Country: Indonesia
- Provinces: DKI Jakarta; Banten
- Major cities: North Jakarta; Tangerang

Highway system
- Transport in Indonesia

The Prof. Dr. Ir. Soedijatmo Toll Road, also commonly spelled as Prof. Dr. Ir. Sedyatmo Toll Road, is a controlled-access toll road in North Jakarta that connects the Soekarno–Hatta International Airport with the city of Jakarta in Indonesia. Completed in 1985 and operated by Jasa Marga, the toll road is named after Soedijatmo, an Indonesian civil engineer.

== Exit and gates ==
Province	Location	km	mi	Exit	Name	Destinations	Notes
DKI Jakarta	Penjaringan, North Jakarta	25.6	15.9	25C	Angke Interchange	Jakarta Inner Ring Road; Eastbound; Ancol; Tanjung Priok; Southbound; Angke; Grogol; Jakarta–Tangerang Toll Road	Eastern terminus
DKI Jakarta	Penjaringan, North Jakarta	21.6	13.4	21	Kapuk Toll Gate	Pluit; Jakarta Inner Ring Road	Eastbound only
DKI Jakarta	Penjaringan, North Jakarta	25.0	15.5	25	Kamal Interchange	Northbound; Pantai Indah Kapuk; Southbound; Jakarta Outer Ring Road; Jakarta–Tangerang Toll Road	
DKI Jakarta	Kalideres, West Jakarta	31.0	19.3		Cengkareng Toll Gate	Tegal Alur; Jakarta Outer Ring Road 2; Soekarno-Hatta International Airport	Westbound only
DKI Jakarta	Kalideres, West Jakarta	31.1	19.3	31	Tegal Alur Ramp	Tegal Alur; Rawa Bokor	Westbound exit only
Banten	Benda, Tangerang	31.4	19.5	31	Benda Interchange	Jakarta Outer Ring Road 2 (Cengkareng–Batu Ceper–Kunciran Toll Road); Jakarta–Tangerang Toll Road	
Banten	Benda, Tangerang	33.0	20.5	Soekarno-Hatta International Airport			
1.000 mi = 1.609 km; 1.000 km = 0.621 mi: Electronic toll collection; Incomplete access; Route transition

== Route ==
KM	Jakarta to Airport	Airport to Jakarta
0	Angke IC	
0	Entry from Jakarta Inner Ring Road; East; Tanjung Priok; Ancol; Kemayoran; Gedong Panjang; Jembatan Tiga; South; Angke 1 Angke 2 Jelambar 1 Jelambar 2 Tanjung Duren; Tomang; Slipi 2 Slipi 1 Pejompongan; Senayan	Exit to Jakarta Inner Ring Road; East; Jembatan Tiga 1 Jembatan Tiga 2 Gedong Panjang 1 Gedong Panjang 2 Ancol Barat; Kemayoran; Ancol Timur; Tanjung Priok 2 South; Angke; Jelambar; Tanjung Duren; Tomang; Slipi; Pejompongan; Senayan
1	Entry from Pluit; Exit to Kapuk Muara	Exit to Pluit; Entry from Pluit 2
2	Kapuk Toll Plaza; Pay Toll; E-toll Only; Opened Toll System	
6	PIK IC	
6	Exit to North; Pantai Indah Kapuk; South; Jakarta Outer Ring Road; Daan Mogot; Puri Indah; Jakarta–Tangerang Toll Road; Pondok Indah; Entry from South; Jakarta Outer Ring Road; Daan Mogot; Puri Indah; Jakarta–Tangerang Toll Road; Pondok Indah	Exit to North; Pantai Indah Kapuk; South; Jakarta Outer Ring Road; Daan Mogot; Puri Indah; Jakarta–Tangerang Toll Road; Pondok Indah; Entry from South; Jakarta Outer Ring Road; Daan Mogot; Puri Indah; Jakarta–Tangerang Toll Road; Pondok Indah; North; Pantai Indah Kapuk
11	Cengkareng Toll Plaza; Pay Toll; E-toll Only; Opened Toll System	
11	Exit to Kamal; Tegal Alur	
11	West Jakarta Border	
11	Jakarta Capital Region Border	
11	Banten Province Border	
11	Tangerang City Border	
12	Exit to Benda; Dadap; Batuceper (Daan Mogot); Entry from Benda	Exit to Benda; Dadap; Batuceper (Daan Mogot); Entry from Benda
13	Soekarno–Hatta International Airport	

== Flood ==
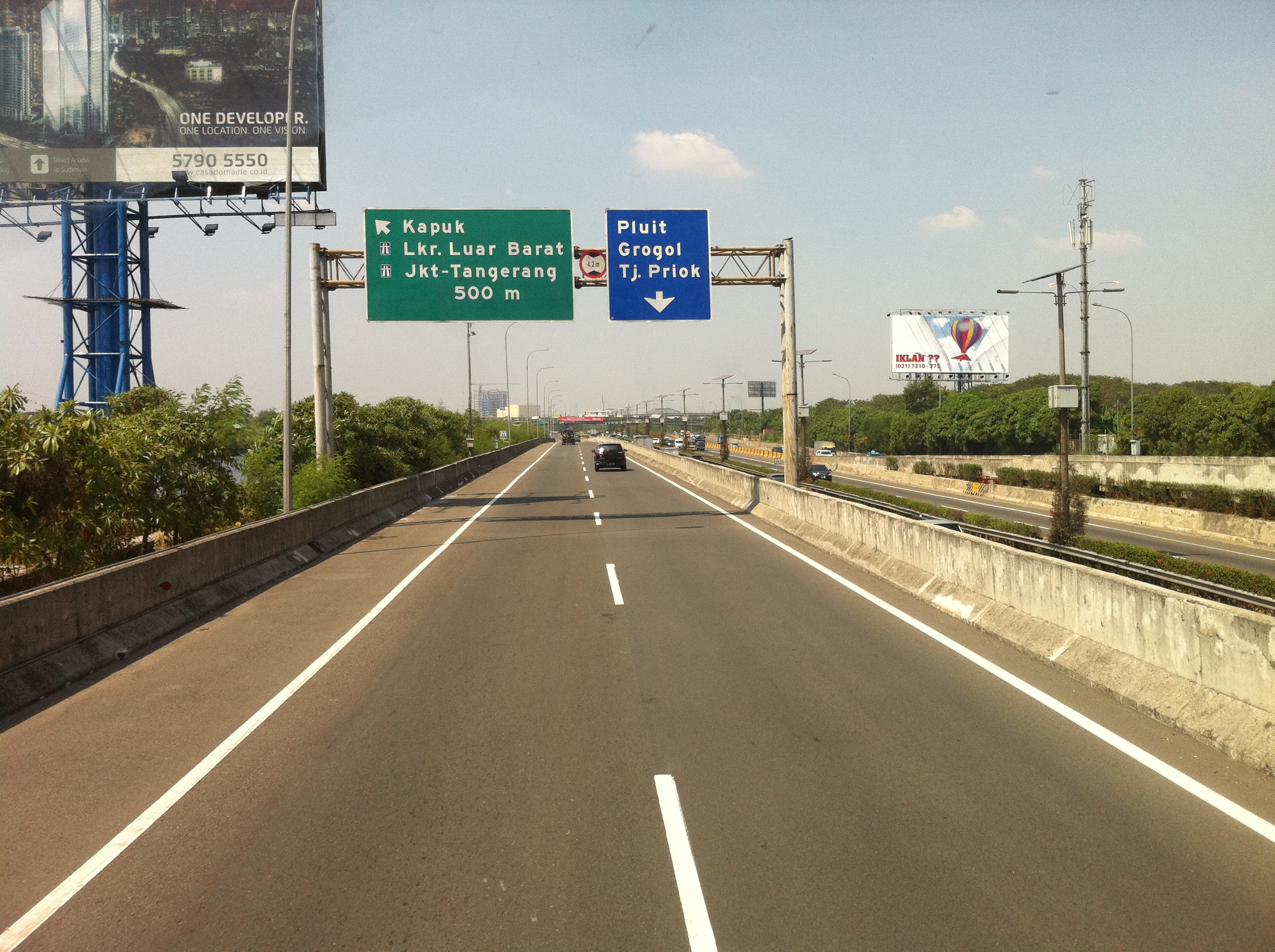
The elevated section of the toll road in 2015.

In 2008, nearly 1,000 flights were delayed or diverted and 259 were cancelled after heavy rainfall flooded a three-kilometer stretch of the toll road. In 2012, the Jakarta governor guaranteed that the toll road will not be flooded again due to the operation of three screw pumps with a total capacity of draining 12 cubic meters of water per second which cover water drainage canals across a total area of 385 hectares.
