= Jakarta Elevated Toll Road =

Toll roads in Jakarta

Route information
- Maintained by PT Jakarta Tollroad Development (JTD)
- Length: 69.77 km (43.35 mi)

Location
- Country: Indonesia
- Island: Java
- Provinces: Jakarta

Highway system
- Transport in Indonesia

Jakarta Elevated Toll Road (Indonesian: 6 Ruas Tol Dalam Kota) (also known as: Jakarta Inner Ring Road 2 (JIRR 2 or JIRR II) are a six planned all-elevated controlled-access toll roads in Jakarta with an exclusive (dedicated) public transportation lane, and direct connection to Jakarta Outer Ring Toll Road 1 and Jakarta Outer Ring Toll Road 2, with total length of 69.77 kilometres (43.35 miles). It's constructed and operated by PT Jakarta Tollroad Development (JTD)

The Elevated Toll Road will not have a direct connection with the existing Inner Ring Toll Road, since the purpose of its construction is to divide the traffic in the city by directing vehicles to exit from the city, not directing vehicles back into the city of Jakarta. The Toll Road also specially designed to have a long distance from gate or ramp on/off or to the nearest junction after one and another to avoid a vehicle build up congestion.

== Phase development ==
The six Jakarta inner toll road segment project is broken down into three stages. The first stage is currently under construction, and as for the second and third stages, the construction will be carried out in parallel.

- The first phase construction is started since February 2017 and completed on July 19th, 2021. The first stage is divided into three sections, which are section A covering Kelapa Gading to Pulo Gadung spanning 9.30 kilometres (5.78 miles), section B covering Semanan to Grogol spanning 9.50 kilometres (5.90 miles), and section C covering Grogol to Kelapa Gading spanning 12.4 kilometres (7.7 miles).
- The second stage covering Duri Pulo to Kampung Melayu spanning 12.65 kilometres (7.86 miles) and Kemayoran to Kampung Melayu spanning 9.60 kilometres (5.97 miles) was targeted to be in operation by early 2021.
- The third stage covering Ulujami to Tanah Abang spanning 8.70 kilometres (5.41 miles) and Pasar Minggu to Casablanca spanning 9.16 kilometres (5.69 miles) was set to be operational by mid-2022.

=== Phase 1 ===
In January 2014, Environmental Impact Assessment (Analisa Mengenai Dampak Lingkungan/AMDAL) has been finished and ready to the next step development.

==== Semanan–Grogol–Sunter Toll Road ====
The length is 20.23 kilometres (12.57 miles) with the investment value of Rp9.76 trillion.

==== Sunter–Kelapa Gading–Pulo Gebang Toll Road ====
The length is 9.44 kilometres (5.87 miles) with the investment value of Rp7.37 trillion. This section was built since February 2017 and completed on July 19th, 2021.

=== Phase 2 ===
==== Duri Pulo–Kampung Melayu Toll Road ====
The length is 12.65 kilometres (7.86 miles) with the investment value of Rp5.96 trillion.

==== Kampung Melayu–Kemayoran Toll Road ====
The length is 9.60 kilometres (5.97 miles) with the investment value of Rp6.95 trillion.

=== Phase 3 ===
==== Ulujami–Tanah Abang ====
The length is 8.70 kilometres (5.41 miles) with the investment value of Rp4.25 trillion.

=== Phase 4 ===
==== Pasar Minggu–Casablanca Toll Road ====
The length is 9.15 kilometres (5.69 miles) with the investment value of Rp5.71 trillion.

== Public transportation lane ==
All the elevated toll roads will have an exclusive (dedicated) public transportation lane, two lanes for public, and one lane for TransJakarta.

== Right to Match ==
The tender use Right to Match system, so the lowest bidder is not directly become the winner, because the lowest bidder value will be offered to Jakarta Administration consortium first with the lowest bidder value, if the consortium agree, so the lowest bidder become a loser. The prominent PT Jasa Marga, which operates many toll roads, has expressed not to follow the tender.

On 19 December 2012, a consortium is named Jakarta Tollroad Development has been built consists of:

- PT Jakarta Propertindo
- Pembangunan Jaya Group
- PT Hutama Karya
- PT Pembangunan Perumahan Tbk (IDX: PTPP)
- PT Wijaya Karya Tbk (IDX: WIKA)
- PT Adhi Karya Tbk (IDX: ADHI)
- PT Citra Marga Nursaphala Persada Tbk (IDX: CMNP)

== Contra ==
One transportation expert say that the elevated toll roads will not ease a much the congestion, due to most of the elevated toll roads will touch or parallel with the current routes.

== See also ==
- Jakarta Inner Ring Road
- Jakarta Outer Ring Road
- Jakarta Outer Ring Road 2
- Jakarta metropolitan area
