= YARSI University =

University in Central Jakarta, Indonesia

- Universitas YARSI
- Motto: SCORE (Smart, Compassionate, Reliable)
- Type: Private
- Established: April 15, 1967
- Founders: Prof. dr. H. Jurnalis Uddin, PAK, Prof. dr. Asri Rasad, M.Sc., Ph.D, Drs. med. Malimar S, Dr. H. Ali Akbar, Drs. Med Maksum S, Jahja E. Wirjatmo, SE, H. A. Karim Oey
- Rector: Prof. dr. Fasli Jalal, Sp.GK., Ph.D.
- Academic staff: 300
- Administrative staff: 111
- Total staff: 411
- Students: 4,850
- Location: Menara YARSI, Jl. Let. Jend. Suprapto Kav. 13. Cempaka Putih, Jakarta Pusat, DKI Jakarta 10510., Central Jakarta, Indonesia; 6.169528°S 106.870028°E
- Campus: Urban
- Colors: YARSI Green
- Website: www.yarsi.ac.id

Universitas YARSI (English: YARSI University) is a private Islamic university located in Cempaka Putih, Central Jakarta. It was established on 15 April 1967 as Perguruan Tinggi Kedokteran (English: Medical College) YARSI. Originally founded to address the shortage of medical professionals among the Muslim community in Indonesia, the university has since evolved into a comprehensive institution offering a diverse range of academic programs across multiple disciplines. Universitas YARSI is a pioneer and the trailblazer in Islamic medical programs in Indonesian higher education.

The university is located in Central Jakarta, Special Capital Region of Jakarta (Indonesian: Daerah Khusus Ibukota Jakarta; DKI Jakarta). The campus is located on land with an area of 25,000 m^{2} and a building area of 19,300 m^{2} consisting of various buildings.

== History ==
Universitas YARSI was established by the Islamic Hospital Foundation of Indonesia (Indonesian: Yayasan Rumah Sakit Islam Indonesia or YARSI) on 15 April 1967 as Medical College YARSI. Its status changed to YARSI Higher Education of Medicine in 1969.

Once YARSI was established as a medical school, the founders created a new faculty, from 1988 to 1999 three faculties were established, Faculty of Economics, Faculty of Law, Faculty of Industry Technology (now the Faculty of Information Technology). At the same time the YARSI Medical School of Jakarta was changed to the Faculty of Medicine and all four faculties became Universitas YARSI.

In 2007 YARSI added the Faculty of Psychology. In 2012 YARSI added the Faculty of Dentistry. In 2023, Universitas YARSI opened the Primary Care Family Medicine Specialist program.

== Rector ==
List of rectors of Universitas YARSI:

Period	Rector
1987 - 2025	Prof. Asri Rasad, M.Sc., Ph.D
2005 - 2009	Prof. Dr. Abdul Salam M. Sofro, Ph.D., SpKT(P)
2009 - 2013	Prof. Dr. Abdul Salam M. Sofro, Ph.D., SpKT(P)
2013 - 2017	Susi Endrini, S.Si., M.Sc., Ph.D
2017 - 2019	Susi Endrini, S.Si., M.Sc., Ph.D
2019 - 2021	Prof. dr. Fasli Jalal, Sp.GK., Ph.D.
2021 - 2026	Prof. dr. Fasli Jalal, Sp.GK., Ph.D.

== Ranking ==
Universitas YARSI is one of the top private universities in Jakarta, Indonesia. It is ranked 801-1000 globally in THE Impact Ranking 2024. It is also ranked 8 in Jakarta by the EduRank 2024.

== Faculties and programs ==
Universitas YARSI has six faculties and one graduate school. All have been accredited by BAN-PT and LAM-PTKes.

Faculty	Program	Accreditation
Medicine	Medical Doctor; Medical Profession; Primary Care Family Medicine Specialist	Excellent; Excellent; Very Good
Dentistry	Dentist; Dentist Profession	B; B
Economic and Business	Management; Accounting	B; Very Good
Law	Law	Very Good
Information Technology	Informatics Engineering; Medical Profession	Very Good; A
Psychology	Psychology	Very Good
Graduate School	Master of Notary; Master of Management; Master of Biomedical Science; Master of Hospital Administration; Doctor of Biomedical Science	Very Good; Very Good; Very Good; Good; Very Good

== Partnerships and collaboration ==
With long-term plans towards an international university, Universitas YARSI has collaborated with other institutions worldwide.

Academic collaborations have been conducted with universities, local and overseas. This has taken the form of student and staff exchange, joint research and internship programs. The student and staff exchange, along with joint research, has been conducted with Universiti Malaysia Sarawak, Dayananda Sagar Institutions, Hubei University, Mapúa University, and INTI International University to name but a few.

Universitas YARSI has worked with other institutions to enhance its application of academic programs developed in the university. The institutions include national private and government institutions, both local and from overseas.

== See also ==
- List of Islamic educational institutions
