= SMA Negeri 66 Jakarta =

Location
- Jalan Bango III, Pondok Labu; Cilandak; South Jakarta, DKI Jakarta 12450; Indonesia

Information
- Type: Public school
- Motto: Bersama Kita, Pasti Bisa!
- Established: 1 July 1981; 44 years ago
- Status: Sekolah Menengah Atas Negeri (State Senior High School)
- Principal: Drs. Deny Boy, MM
- Grades: X-XII with Programme: Mathematic and Science (MIPA=Matematika dan Ilmu Alam); Social Science (IPS=Ilmu Pengetahuan Sosial)
- Accreditation: A
- Website: http://www.sman66-jkt.sch.id

SMA Negeri 66 Jakarta (66 Senior High School of Jakarta) is an Indonesian public high school. It is managed by the Ministry of Education and Culture Republic (Kementerian Pendidikan dan Kebudayaan Republik Indonesia). The school is located at Jl. Bango III, Pondok Labu, Cilandak, South Jakarta, Jakarta, Indonesia.

== History ==
In July 1980, SMA Negeri 34 Jakarta (34 State Senior High School of Jakarta) asked for a license to open Kelas Jauh. On 6 August 1980 the license was approved. A year of preparation preceded the launch on 20 July 1981. After less than a year of operation, on 10 April 1982 it was declared that "SMAN 34 Jakarta Kelas Jauh" would officially become SMA Negeri 66 Jakarta. A full building rehabilitation followed. From 2002-2004 SMAN 66 Jakarta moved to SDN Pondok Labu 12 (12th Pondok Labu Primary School of Jakarta), SDN Pondok Labu 13 (13th Pondok Labu Primary School Jakarta), and SDN Pondok Labu 15 (15th Pondok Labu Primary School of Jakarta). On 24 January 2004, the rehabilitation finished and all elements moved to the new building. The Governor of Jakarta Sutiyoso officially opened SMAN 66 Jakarta on 6 February 2004.

In 2007 the new Khunuzul 'Ibad mosque opened. In 2019 B building was finished. It hosts the counselor's room and a new hall called the B building hall. Science is taught in the B building as well.

== Leadership ==
Principals

- Priatna Sutisna (1981-1989)
- Hudiyah Sembada (1989-1993)
- Suyitno (1993-1996)
- Sudiyati Supangat (1996-2000)
- Ali Amrin M.M. (2000-2003)
- H. Muchtar Effendi (2003-2006)
- Maman Suwarman (2006-2009)
- Sugiyono, M.Pd, M.Si (2009-2013)
- H. Suhari (2013-2015)
- H. Sukarmo, M.Pd (2015 -2016)
- Kusnyoto, S.Pd ( 2017–2021)
- Drs. Deny Boy, MM (2021–present)

== Facilities ==
Facilities include:

- 3 Levels Building (A and B building)
- 21 Classrooms with AC
- Wi-Fi
- Audio Visual in classroom
- Mosque
- Toilet
- Biology Laboratory
- Physics Laboratory
- Chemical Laboratory
- Language Laboratory
- Computer Laboratory
- Hall Room
- School Administration System Room (SAS)
- Principal Room
- Teacher's Room
- First Aid Room / UKS
- Counselling Room
- Student Council Room
- Guest Room
- Administration Room
- Scout's Room
- ROHKRIS/Rohani Kristen's Pray Room
- Al-Qur'an Speaker Room
- Library
- Cooperation
- Canteen
- Football Field
- SRT

== Extracurricular ==
Extracurricular programs include:

- Grease Sixtysix (Modern Dance)
- Samantha D'Six (Traditional Saman Dance)
- Japanese Club
- Cinematography
- Taekwondo
- Pencak Silat
- Karya Ilmiah Remaja/KIR (Youth Scientific Art in Science)
- Palang Merah Remaja/PMR (Youth Red Cross)
- Sixtysix Badminton
- Sixtysix FC (Football and Futsal)
- Sixtysix BC (Basketball)
- Paskibra SMAN 66 Jakarta (Flag Hoisting Troop)
- Rohani Islam/ROHIS (for learn more about Islam)
- Rohani Kristen/ROHKRIS (for learn more about Christian)
- Rohani Katolik/ROKAT (for learn more about Catholic)
- Bahana Patria 66 (66's School Choir)
- TERASONTIME 66 (Theater)
- Balaputradewa & Pramodhawardani (Scout)
- Bango 66 Tubir Fight Club (Fight)

== See also ==
- List of Schools in Indonesia
