= Jakarta Inner Ring Road =

Road in Indonesia

Jakarta Inner Ring Road
- Jalan Tol Lingkar Dalam Jakarta
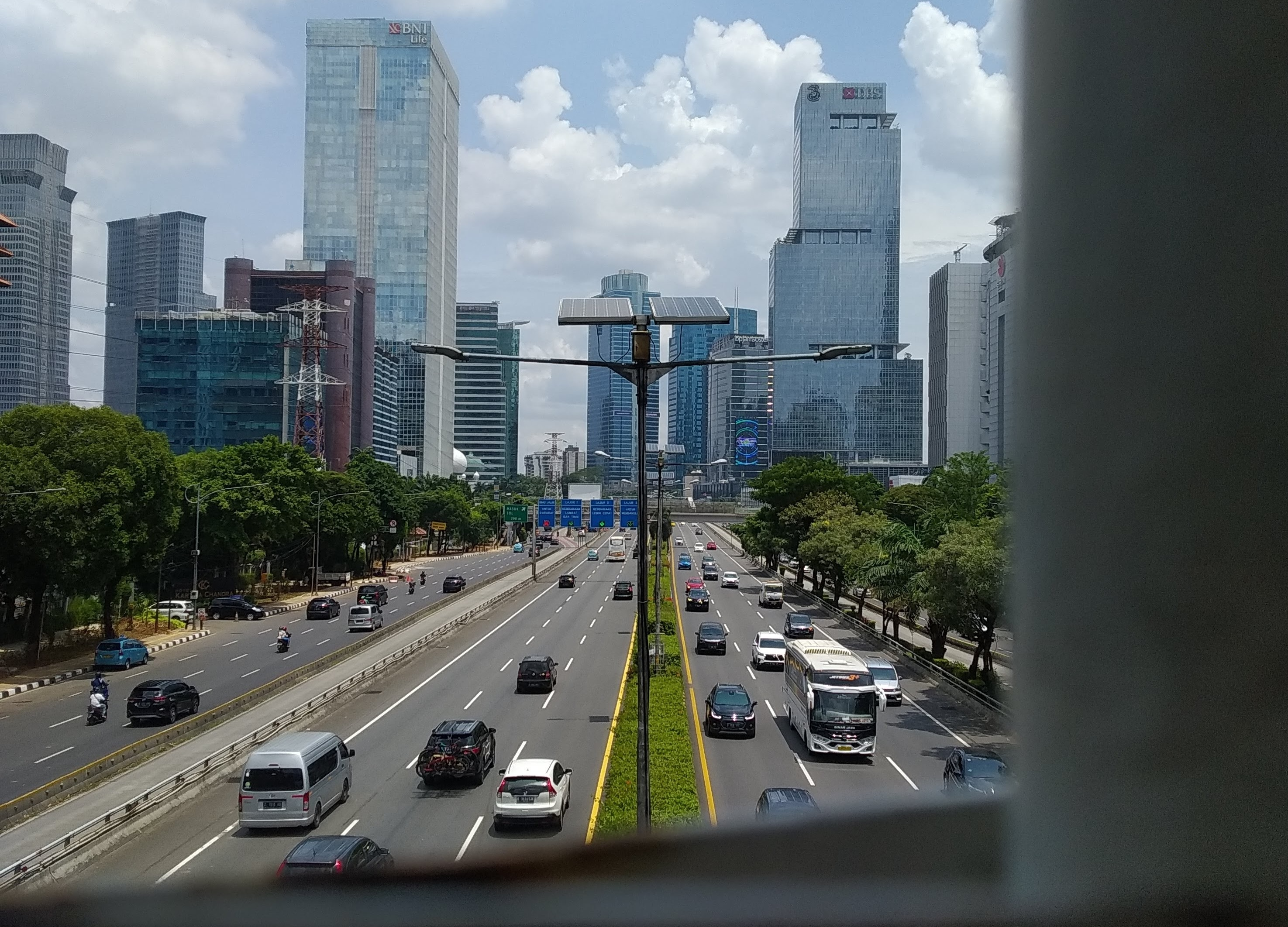
- The Jakarta Inner Ring Road seen from a pedestrian bridge on KM 7,3

Route information
- Maintained by PT Jasa Marga Tbk & PT Citra Marga Nushapala Persada Tbk
- Length: 46 km (29 mi)
- Existed: 1989–present

Major junctions
- Beltway around Jakarta
- From: Cawang
- Jagorawi Toll Road; AH2 – Jakarta–Cikampek Toll Road; Bekasi–Cawang–Kampung Melayu Toll Road; AH2 – Jakarta–Tangerang Toll Road; Prof. Dr. Ir. Soedijatmo Toll Road (Airport Toll Road)
- To: Angke Interchange; Tanjung Priok

Location
- Country: Indonesia
- Major cities: East Jakarta; South Jakarta; North Jakarta; West Jakarta; Central Jakarta

Highway system
- Transport in Indonesia

Jakarta Inner Ring Road (Indonesian: Jalan Tol Lingkar Dalam Jakarta), also known as the Jakarta Inner-City Toll Road (Indonesian: Jalan Tol Dalam Kota Jakarta) is a controlled-access toll road circling the city of Jakarta, Indonesia. On northern and the eastern section, the toll road is grade-separated with the Sosrobahu road construction technique (also used in the Metro Manila Skyway and one half of the Sheikh Mohammed bin Zayed Skyway). The toll road is operated by PT Jasa Marga (Persero) Tbk, a state-owned enterprise, and PT Citra Marga Nusaphala Persada Tbk (CMNP) (IDX: CMNP), founded by the Suharto family which is also the initiator of the Metro Manila Skyway.

== History ==
The stretch of Jakarta Inner Ring Road began with the opening of Jalan Jenderal Gatot Subroto which intersect the Sudirman Road at the Semanggi cloverleaf bridge which is already under construction since the 1960s. In the early 1970s, the Gatot Subroto Road had continued past Tebet and becoming M.T. Haryono Road to Cawang and meet the junction with Major Jendral Panjaitan Road. In the 1970s, another major road runs Jendral Achmad Yani Road and Laksamana Yos Sudarso Road were established to the far east of Jakarta. This road would connect the Semanggi cloverleaf interchange all the way to the port Tanjung Priok. This vitally important highway which connects Central Jakarta directly with the port is the prototype of Jakarta Inner Ring Road, known then as "Jakarta Bypass", so called because the new connection enabling trucks to "bypass the rest of Jakarta while traveling to and from the port." Construction of Jakarta Bypass was funded using the United States financial assistant and was completed in 1963.

Jakarta Bypass also enabled the growth of new suburbs of Cempaka Putih, Pulo Mas, Senen, Rawamangun and Salemba.

== Section ==
Jakarta Inner Ring Road has several sections:

- Cawang–Pluit Toll Road
- Harbor Toll Road
- Ir. Wiyoto Wiyono Toll Road

== Gates and exits ==
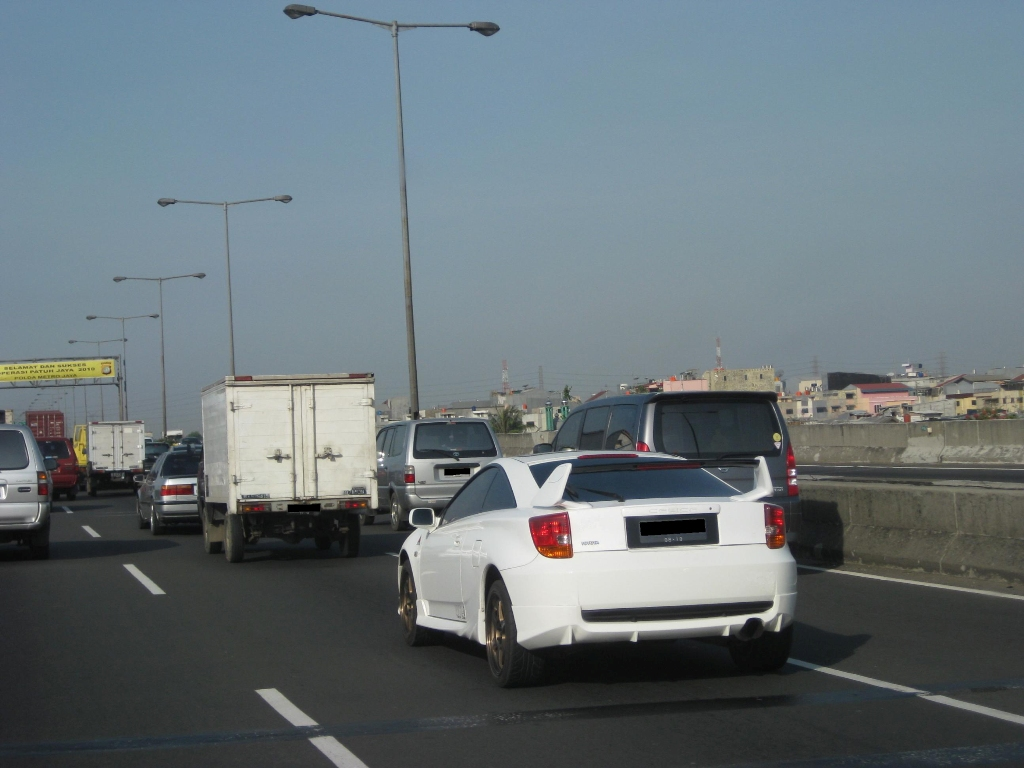
Eastbound Harbor Toll Road

Section	Gates	Exits	Remarks
Cawang–Pluit	Cawang; Tebet 2 Tebet 1 Kuningan 2 Kuningan 1 Semanggi 2 Semanggi 1 Senayan; Pejompongan; Slipi 2 Slipi 1 Tanjung Duren; Jelambar 2 Jelambar 1 Angke 2 Angke 1		
Ir. Wiyoto Wiyono Toll Road	Kebon Nanas; Pedati; Jatinegara; Rawamangun; Pulomas; Cempaka Putih; Sunter; Podomoro; Tanjung Priok 1 Kebon Bawang		
Harbor Toll Road	Tanjung Priok 2 Ancol Timur; Kemayoran; Ancol Barat; Gedong Panjang 2 Gedong Panjang 1 Jembatan Tiga 2 Jembatan Tiga 1		

=== Ir. Wiyoto Wiyono exits ===
Province	Location	km	mi	Exit	Name	Destinations	Notes
Special Capital Region of Jakarta	Makasar, East Jakarta	0.0	0.0	0	Cawang Interchange	Eastbound; Jakarta–Cikampek Toll Road; Bekasi; Bandung; Westbound; Cawang–Pluit Toll Road; Tebet; Tomang; Southbound; Jagorawi Toll Road; TMII; Bogor	Southern terminus
Special Capital Region of Jakarta	Jatinegara, East Jakarta	1.6	0.99		Kebon Nanas Toll Gate		Northbound entry only
Special Capital Region of Jakarta	Jatinegara, East Jakarta	1.6	0.99	1	Halim Ramp	Halim Perdanakusuma International Airport; Cawang	Southbound exit only
Special Capital Region of Jakarta	Jatinegara, East Jakarta	2.0	1.2	2	Pisangan Ramp	Pisangan; Jatinegara; Klender	Northbound exit only
Special Capital Region of Jakarta	Jatinegara, East Jakarta	2.4	1.5		Pedati Toll Gate		Southbound entry only
Special Capital Region of Jakarta	Jatinegara, East Jakarta	2.7	1.7	2	Pedati Interchange	Bekasi–Cawang–Kampung Melayu Toll Road	Southbound exit only
Special Capital Region of Jakarta	Matraman, East Jakarta	4.0	2.5		Jatinegara Toll Gate		Northbound entry only
Special Capital Region of Jakarta	Pulo Gadung, East Jakarta	4.3	2.7	4	Jatinegara Ramp	Jatinegara; Klender	Southbound exit only
Special Capital Region of Jakarta	Matraman, East Jakarta	5.0	3.1	5	Rawamangun Ramp	Rawamangun; Salemba; Pulo Gadung	Northbound exit only
Special Capital Region of Jakarta	Pulo Gadung, East Jakarta	5.1	3.2		Rawamangun Toll Gate		Southbound entry only
Special Capital Region of Jakarta	Cempaka Putih, Central Jakarta	7.2	4.5		Pulomas Toll Gate		Northbound entry only
Special Capital Region of Jakarta	Pulo Gadung, Jakarta Timur	7.3	4.5	7	Pulomas Ramp	Rawamangun; Salemba; Pulo Gadung	Southbound exit only
Special Capital Region of Jakarta	Cempaka Putih, Central Jakarta	8.0	5.0	8	Cempaka Putih Ramp	Cempaka Putih; Senen; Pulo Gadung	Northbound exit only
Special Capital Region of Jakarta	Pulo Gadung, East Jakarta	8.1	5.0		Cempaka Putih Toll Gate		Southbound entry only
Special Capital Region of Jakarta	Tanjung Priok, North Jakarta	9.9	6.2		Sunter Toll Gate		Northbound entry only
Special Capital Region of Jakarta	Kelapa Gading, North Jakarta	10.0	6.2	10	Cempaka Putih Ramp	Cempaka Putih; Senen; Pulo Gadung	Northbound exit only
Special Capital Region of Jakarta	Tanjung Priok, North Jakarta	10.8	6.7	10	Sunter Podomoro Ramp	Sunter; Kelapa Gading	Northbound exit only
Special Capital Region of Jakarta	Kelapa Gading, North Jakarta	11.3	7.0		Podomoro Toll Gate		Southbound entry only
Special Capital Region of Jakarta	Tanjung Priok, North Jakarta	11.9	7.4	12	Plumpang Interchange	Harbor Toll Road; Ancol; Soekarno-Hatta International Airport	
Special Capital Region of Jakarta	Koja, North Jakarta	13.0	8.1	13	Tanjung Priok Ramp	Port of Tanjung Priok; Ancol; Cilincing	Northbound exit & southbound entry only
Special Capital Region of Jakarta	Koja, North Jakarta	13.1	8.1	Kebon Bawang Toll Gate			
Special Capital Region of Jakarta	Koja, North Jakarta	13.2	8.2	Tanjung Priok Access Toll Road			
1.000 mi = 1.609 km; 1.000 km = 0.621 mi: Electronic toll collection; Incomplete access; Route transition

=== Cawang–Pluit exits ===
Province	Location	km	mi	Exit	Name	Destinations	Notes
Special Capital Region of Jakarta	Jatinegara, East Jakarta	0.0	0.0	0	Cawang Interchange	Eastbound; Jakarta–Cikampek Toll Road; Bekasi; Bandung; Northbound; Ir. Wiyoto Wiyono Toll Road; Jatinegara; Tanjung Priok; Southbound; Jagorawi Toll Road; TMII; Bogor	Eastern terminus
Special Capital Region of Jakarta	Pancoran, South Jakarta	1.8	1.1		Cawang Toll Gate		Northwestbound entry only
Special Capital Region of Jakarta	Pancoran, South Jakarta	3.1	1.9	3	Tebet Ramp	Tebet; Pancoran; Manggarai; Pasar Minggu	
Special Capital Region of Jakarta	Tebet, South Jakarta	3.1	1.9		Tebet 2 Toll Gate		Eastbound entry only
Special Capital Region of Jakarta	Pancoran, South Jakarta	4.0	2.5		Tebet 1 Toll Gate		Northwestbound entry only
Special Capital Region of Jakarta	Tebet, South Jakarta	4.8	3.0		Kuningan 2 Toll Gate		Eastbound entry only
Special Capital Region of Jakarta	Mampang Prapatan, South Jakarta	5.0	3.1	5	Kuningan Ramp	Mampang Prapatan; Kuningan; Menteng	
Special Capital Region of Jakarta	Mampang Prapatan, South Jakarta	6.3	3.9		Kuningan 1 Toll Gate		Northwestbound entry only
Special Capital Region of Jakarta	Setiabudi, South Jakarta	6.9	4.3		Semanggi 2 Toll Gate		Southeastbound entry only
Special Capital Region of Jakarta	Kebayoran Baru, South Jakarta	7.8	4.8	8	Semanggi Ramp	Semanggi; Senayan; Kebayoran Baru	
Special Capital Region of Jakarta	Tanah Abang, Central Jakarta	8.9	5.5		Senayan Toll Gate		Northwestbound entry only
Special Capital Region of Jakarta	Tanah Abang, Central Jakarta	9.5	5.9	9	Slipi Ramp	Slipi; Palmerah; Tanah Abang	
Special Capital Region of Jakarta	Tanah Abang, Central Jakarta	10.1	6.3		Pejompongan Toll Gate		Southeastbound exit only
Special Capital Region of Jakarta	Palmerah, West Jakarta	11.0	6.8		Slipi 1 Toll Gate		Northwestbound entry only
Special Capital Region of Jakarta	Palmerah, West Jakarta	11.5	7.1		Slipi 2 Toll Gate		Southeastbound entry only
Special Capital Region of Jakarta	Palmerah, West Jakarta	11.9	7.4	12	Tomang Ramp	Tomang; Grogol	
Special Capital Region of Jakarta	Palmerah, West Jakarta	12.8	8.0	13	Tomang Interchange	Jakarta–Merak Toll Road; Kebon Jeruk; Soekarno-Hatta International Airport	
Special Capital Region of Jakarta	Grogol Petamburan, West Jakarta	13.8	8.6	14	Tanjung Duren Ramp	Tanjung Duren; Grogol; Daan Mogot	
Special Capital Region of Jakarta	Grogol Petamburan, West Jakarta	16.2	10.1		Jelambar Toll Gate		Northwestbound/southeastbound entry only
Special Capital Region of Jakarta	Grogol Petamburan, West Jakarta	17.4	10.8	17	Angke Toll Gate	Angke; Jelambar	
Special Capital Region of Jakarta	Penjaringan, North Jakarta	18.6	11.6	19	Angke Interchange	Eastbound; Harbor Toll Road; Ancol; Port of Tanjung Priok; Westbound; Prof. Dr. Ir. Soedijatmo Toll Road; Jakarta Outer Ring Road; Jakarta Outer Ring Road 2; Soekarno-Hatta International Airport	Northwestern terminus
1.000 mi = 1.609 km; 1.000 km = 0.621 mi: Electronic toll collection; Incomplete access; Route transition

=== Harbor Toll Road exits ===
Province	Location	km	mi	Exit	Name	Destinations	Notes
Special Capital Region of Jakarta	Tanjung Priok, North Jakarta	13.7	8.5	13	Plumpang Interchange	Northbound (Leftest exit); Tanjung Priok; Port of Tanjung Priok; Cilincing; Northbound (Rightest exit); Tanjung Priok Access Toll Road; Jakarta Outer Ring Road; Jakarta–Cikampek Toll Road; Southbound; Ir. Wiyoto Wiyono Toll Road; Cempaka Putih; Cawang	Eastern terminus
Special Capital Region of Jakarta	Tanjung Priok, North Jakarta	13.7	8.5		Tanjung Priok 2 Toll Gate		Westbound entry only
Special Capital Region of Jakarta	Pademangan, North Jakarta	17.8	11.1	18	Ancol Ramp	Ancol; Kemayoran; Jakarta International Expo	Westbound exit only
Special Capital Region of Jakarta	Pademangan, North Jakarta	17.8	11.1		Ancol Timur Toll Gate		Eastbound entry only
Special Capital Region of Jakarta	Pademangan, North Jakarta	18.4	11.4	18	Ancol Ramp	Kemayoran; Jakarta International Expo; Sunter	Eastbound exit only
Special Capital Region of Jakarta	Pademangan, North Jakarta	18.6	11.6		Kemayoran Toll Gate		Westbound entry only
Special Capital Region of Jakarta	Pademangan, North Jakarta	20.6	12.8		Ancol Barat Toll Gate		Westbound entry only
Special Capital Region of Jakarta	Penjaringan, North Jakarta	22.4	13.9	22	Gedong Panjang Toll Gate	Sunda Kelapa; Glodok	
Special Capital Region of Jakarta	Penjaringan, North Jakarta	23.8	14.8	24	Jembatan Tiga Toll Gate	Jembatan Tiga; Pluit	
Special Capital Region of Jakarta	Penjaringan, North Jakarta	24.7	15.3	25	Angke Interchange	Southwestbound; Cawang-Pluit Toll Road; Tomang; Jakarta–Merak Toll Road; Cawang; Northwestbound; Prof. Dr. Ir. Soedijatmo Toll Road; Jakarta Outer Ring Road; Jakarta Outer Ring Road 2; Soekarno-Hatta International Airport	Western terminus
1.000 mi = 1.609 km; 1.000 km = 0.621 mi: Electronic toll collection; Incomplete access; Route transition

== Fee ==
Group I	Group II	Group III	Group IV	Group V
Rp 10,500	Rp 15,500	Rp 15,500	Rp 17,500	Rp 17,500

== See also ==
- Jakarta Elevated Toll Road
- Jakarta Outer Ring Road
- Jakarta Outer Ring Road 2

== Cited works ==
- Merrillees, Scott (2015). Jakarta: Portraits of a Capital 1950-1980. Jakarta: Equinox Publishing. ISBN 9786028397308.
