= St. Moritz, Jakarta =

St Moritz Penthouse and Residences
- Location: Jakarta, Indonesia
- Coordinates: 6.188011°S 106.738755°E
- Address: Jl. Puri Indah Raya Boulevard, Kembangan, West Jakarta
- Opened: July 2014
- Developer: Lippo Group
- Num. of anchor tenants: 6
- Floor area: 490,000 m^{2} (5,300,000 sq ft) (The complex) 130,000 m^{2} (1,400,000 sq ft)
- Floors: 40x6 (residences); 6 (Lippo Mall Puri); 6 (Living Plaza Puri)
- Parking: 5000
- Public transit: Transjakarta : 3E Puri Indah - Sentraland Cengkareng & 1M Meruya - Blok M Jakarta MRT : M2 Batu Mulia (Planned)
- Website: thestmoritz.com

St Moritz Penthouse and Residences is an integrated development, which consists of six apartment towers, office tower, five star hotel (JW Marriot), 2 shopping centers (Lippo Mall Puri and Living Plaza Puri), school, hospital, country club and convention center, located at Kembangan, West Jakarta, Indonesia. The complex has a land area of about 12 hectares (30 acres), which is developed by Lippo Group. The six apartment towers and Lippo Office Tower are integrated with Lippo Mall Puri.

== Lippo Mall Puri ==
Lippo Mall Puri logo

Tenants in Lippo Mall Puri include: Sogo Department Store, Matahari Department Store, Cinema XXI, Zara, Adidas, Cotton On, Marks & Spencer, H & M, Stradivarius, Adelle Jewellery, Victoria's Secret, Uniqlo, Starbucks, Sociolla, Kidz Station, and others.

== Living Plaza Puri ==
Living Plaza Puri (formerly PX Pavilion @ The St. Moritz) is a shopping, lifestyle and entertainment center, currently operated by Kawan Lama Group. The 6-floor building has a 1000-square-meter Grand Ballroom that can accommodate major events such as weddings, exhibitions, seminars, corporate functions, shooting movies, concerts, debates, product launching, birthdays, auctions and lifestyle events. The anchor tenants are Azko and Informa. The PX Pavilion closed in early 2023 and Lippo Group sold the ownership to Kawan Lama Group to be renovated. PX Pavilion was reopened as Living Plaza Puri on 28 October 2023.

== See also ==
- List of shopping malls in Jakarta
- Kembangan
