= Cempaka Putih =

District in Central Jakarta, Indonesia

Coordinates: 6.184°S 106.867°E

- District
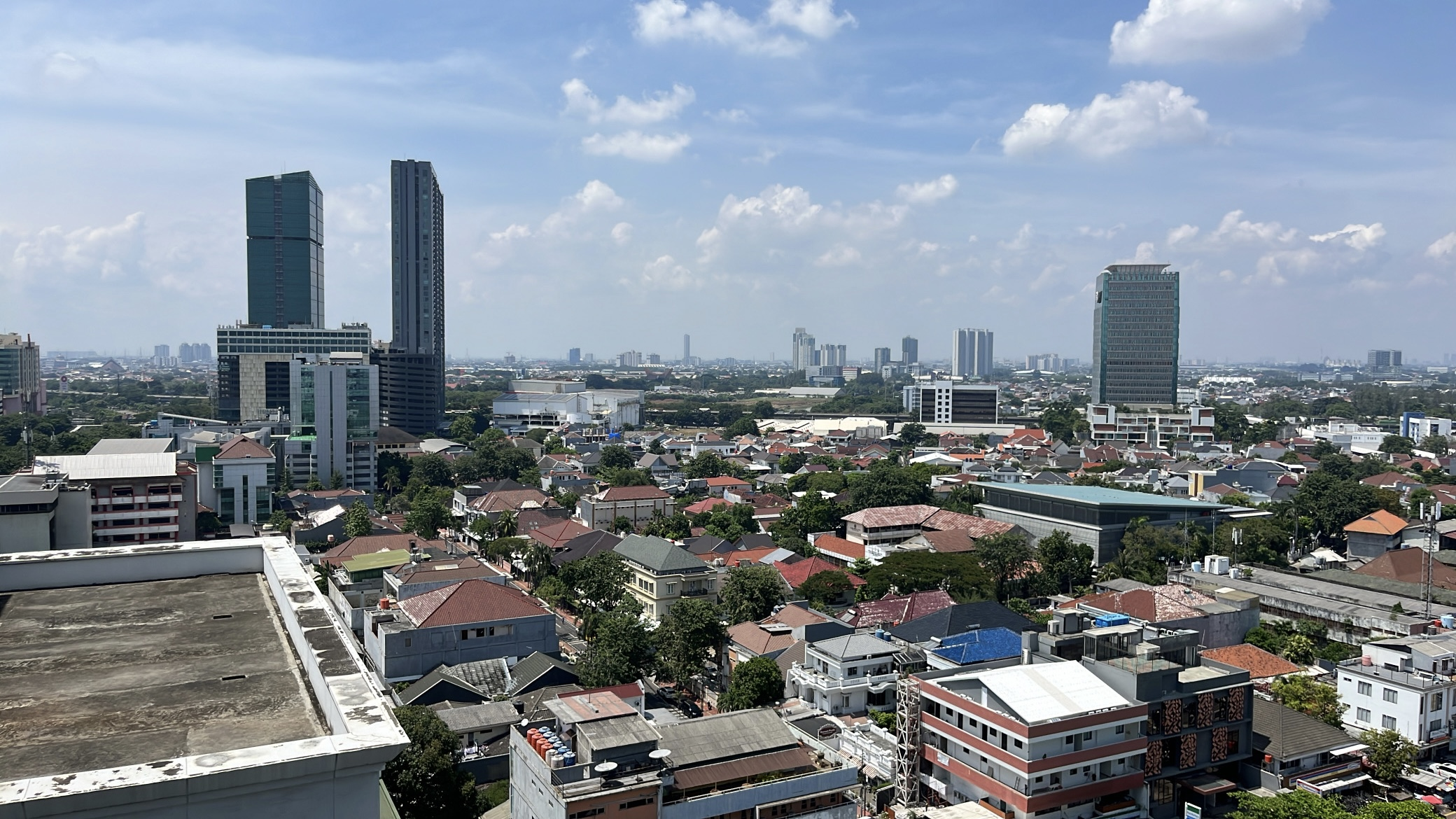
- Interactive map of Cempaka Putih
- Country: Indonesia
- Province: Jakarta
- Administrative city: Central Jakarta

Cempaka Putih is a district (Indonesian: kecamatan) in the administrative city of Central Jakarta. Cempaka Putih is bounded by Jenderal Ahmad Yani Bypass Highway to the east, Pramuka Road to the south, Letjend Suprapto Road to the north, and a railway line to the west. The name "Cempaka Putih" is derived from flowering plant white champaca.

== History ==
Cempaka Putih district was formerly part of Senen district, later broken up in 1969 into Cempaka Putih district and Senen district. At first, Cempaka Putih district consisted of seven Administrative Village: Cempaka Putih Timur, Cempaka Putih Barat, Galur, Tanah Tinggi, Kampung Rawa, Johar Baru, and Rawasari. In 1993, the Administrative Village of Galur, Tanah Tinggi, Kampung Rawa, and Johar Baru was separated to form the district of Johar Baru ("New Johar").

The Administrative Village of Cempaka Putih Barat was the first area to be developed in Cempaka Putih district. In 1952, 30 hectares of land in Rawasari were allocated for housing, this area roughly correspond to the present Cempaka Putih Barat Administrative Village. By 1960, the housing neighborhood had emerged, roughly at the same time with the development of Tanah Tinggi housing neighborhood.

== Kelurahan (administrative village) ==
The district of Cempaka Putih is divided into three administrative villages (kelurahan):

- Cempaka Putih Timur ("East Cempaka Putih") – area code 10510
- Cempaka Putih Barat ("West Cempaka Putih") – area code 10520
- Rawasari – area code 10570

== Areas ==
Most parts of Cempaka Putih district are residential and of high density, referred to as kampung. Some areas in Taman Solo area around Cempaka Putih Raya street consist of well-planned upscale housings.

Certain parts facing major roads such as Pramuka, Ahmad Yani, and Letjend Suprapto streets are business and office areas. There are also certain streets unofficially recognized as distinctive business areas, such as Cempaka Putih Raya street that were originally residential before their conversion to rows of restaurants, clothing stores and supermarkets. Rawasari Selatan Raya to Percetakan Negara Street are flanked with rows of tiles, ceramics and building materials stores.

== List of important places ==
- Islamic Hospital Jakarta
- Pertamina Jaya Hospital
- Trisakti University F Campus
- Jayabaya University B Campus
- YARSI University
- Salemba Prison
- Arcici Sport Center

== Main hotels ==
Hotels include the Cempaka; Patra Jasa; Sentral Hotel Jakarta and other accommodation such as the Green Pramuka Apartement.
