= Tanjung Priok Access Toll Road =

Toll Road in Indonesia

Route information
- Maintained by PT Hutama Karya; PT Jalan Tol Lingkar Luar Jakarta (Temporary); PT Citra Marga Nusaphala Persada (Temporary)
- Length: 11.4 km (7.1 mi)
- Existed: 2017–present

Major junctions
- East end: Rorotan
- Jakarta Inner Ring Road; Jakarta Outer Ring Road
- West end: Kampung Bahari (Under Construction)

Location
- Country: Indonesia
- Major cities: North Jakarta

Highway system
- Transport in Indonesia

Tanjung Priok Access Toll Road is a toll road that provides direct access to or from Tanjung Priok Port, which is part of Jakarta Outer Ring Road 2 road network in Jakarta, Indonesia. This 11.4 km highway is part of the Jabodetabek toll road network system connected to the Jakarta Outer Ring Road and Jakarta Inner Ring Road. The toll road was inaugurated on 15 April 2017.

== Sections ==
- East Section (E)1- Rorotan to Cilincing (3,4 km)
- East Section(E)2- Cilincing to Jampea (2,74 km)
- East Section (E)2A- Cilincing to Simpang Jampea (1,92 km)
- North-South Section (NS) Link- Yos Sudarso to Simpang Jampea (2,24 km)
- North-South (NS) Direct Ramp- (1,1 km)

== Construction ==
The Tanjung Priok access toll road project is funded through JICA loans with a total investment of Rp 4.5 trillion and a construction budget of Rp 3.5 trillion. The project was originally scheduled for completion by the end of 2015, but certainly not achieved. The first phase of the loan agreement was on March 31, 2005 with a value of Rp 2.236 trillion, while phase 2 was done on March 29, 2006 with a value of Rp 2.263 trillion. Due to the old planning and auction process, price increases and loan budgets are insufficient to finance the project, eventually a breakthrough by creating new packaging. From the new packaging:

- Section E1 is conducted by SMCC-Hutama Karya JO, contract value Rp 662.5 Billion
- E2 Section implemented by Kajima-Waskita Karya JO, contract value Rp 1.04 trillion
- E2A Section implemented by Obayashi-Jaya Construction JO, contract value Rp 1.06 trillion.
- Section NS Yos Link is implemented by SMCC-Hutama Karya JO, contract value Rp 489B.
- The NS Direct Ramp section is implemented by Tobishima-Wijaya Karya JO, the contract value is Rp 255 billion

Section E1, which started its operation on March 30, 2010, officially operates without tariff on April 17, 2011, while the other section is still under construction.

=== Further Expansion ===
There were plans to build the Section West 1 Priok of West Priok toll road with Jampea-Kampung Bahari and Section West 2 Kampung Bahari of Tanjung Priok Port which was scheduled to be implemented in 2020, however this project wasn't considered as urgent as sections E1, E2, and NS due to the current operating sections are considered sufficient to meet the needs of roads in the region at this time.

=== Opening ===
Tanjung Priok Access Toll Road was inaugurated to the public after it was inaugurated by President Joko Widodo on April 15, 2017. The toll road is managed temporarily by PT Jalantol Lingkarluar Jakarta (JLJ) on Kebon Bawang-Rorotan and PT Citra Marga Nusaphala Persada at segment of Kebon Bawang-SS Plumpang before being managed permanently by PT Hutama Karya. After inaugurated by President Joko Widodo, this toll road was free for a month.

== Exits ==
Province	Location	km	mi	Exit	Name	Destinations	Notes
Special Capital Region of Jakarta	Cilincing, North Jakarta	58.3	36.2	Jakarta Outer Ring Road			
Special Capital Region of Jakarta	Cilincing, North Jakarta	60.1	37.3	60	Cilincing Interchange	Jakarta Outer Ring Road 2; Tarumajaya; Jakarta–Cikampek Toll Road	
Special Capital Region of Jakarta	Cilincing, North Jakarta	64.2	39.9	64	Cilincing Ramp	Cilincing; Koja; Jampea	Southwest-bound exit only
Special Capital Region of Jakarta	Cilincing, North Jakarta	64.5	40.1		Koja Timur Toll Gate		Southeast-bound entry only
Special Capital Region of Jakarta	Koja, North Jakarta	65.4	40.6	65	Koja Ramp	Koja; Jakarta International Container Terminal	
Special Capital Region of Jakarta	Koja, North Jakarta	65.8	40.9		Koja Barat Toll Gate		Southwest-bound entry only
Special Capital Region of Jakarta	Koja, North Jakarta	66.0	41.0		Koja Direct Toll Gate		Southeast-bound entry only from JICT
Special Capital Region of Jakarta	Koja, North Jakarta	67.6	42.0		Kebon Bawang Toll Gate		Central toll gate for southeast-bound only
Special Capital Region of Jakarta	Koja, North Jakarta	68.0	42.3	Jakarta Inner Ring Road			
1.000 mi = 1.609 km; 1.000 km = 0.621 mi: Electronic toll collection; Incomplete access; Route transition

== See also ==
- Jakarta Inner Ring Road
- Jakarta Outer Ring Road
- Jakarta Outer Ring Road 2
