= Cilandak =

District of South Jakarta, Indonesia

- District
- Interactive map of Cilandak
- Coordinates: 6°17′32″S 106°47′40″E
- Country: Indonesia
- Province: Jakarta
- Administrative city: South Jakarta

Area
  - Total: 18.20 km^{2} (7.03 sq mi)
- Elevation: 32 m (105 ft)

Population (2023)
  - Total: 229,201
  - Density: 12,593/km^{2} (32,620/sq mi)
- Time zone: UTC+7 (Asia/Jakarta)
- Postal code: 12410, 12420, 12430, 12440, 12450
- Area code: 021

Cilandak (Sundanese: ᮎᮤᮜᮔ᮪ᮓᮊ᮪) is a district (Indonesian: kecamatan) in the administrative city of South Jakarta, Indonesia. The Krukut River flows through the eastern edge of Cilandak, while the Pesanggrahan and Grogol Rivers flow through the western edge.

The southern portion of the Jakarta Outer Ring Road passes through the district.

== History ==
Historically, sub-districts in the district of Cilandak were part of the Kebayoran Lama district, Bogor Regency, and Tangerang Regency.

== Subdistricts ==
The district of Cilandak is divided into five kelurahan or subdistricts:

- Cipete Selatan - area code 12410
- Gandaria Selatan - area code 12420
- Cilandak Barat - area code 12430
- Lebak Bulus - area code 12440
- Pondok Labu - area code 12450

== Landmarks ==
- BATAN (Badan Tenaga Atom Nasional or National Atomic Energy Agency) nuclear technology research center (Established in 1966)
- Cilandak Town Square shopping mall
- Gereja Paroki St. Stefanus or "St. Stephen Parish's Church" (established in 1977)
- Pondok Labu Market
- TNI Research and Development Center.
- Prambors, a commercial radio network

== Education ==
- Jakarta Intercultural School, Cilandak campus
- Singapore International School Bona Vista - Lebak Bulus
- SMAN 66 Jakarta
- SMPN 85 Jakarta
- Universitas Pembangunan Nasional "Veteran" Jakarta
- SMAN 34 Jakarta
