= Cempaka Putih Timur =

- Administrative village
- Location within Jakarta Location within Java Location within Indonesia
- Country: Indonesia
- Province: DKI Jakarta
- Administrative city: Central Jakarta
- District: Cempaka Putih
- Postal code: 10510

Cempaka Putih Timur is an administrative village in the Cempaka Putih district, Central Jakarta, Indonesia. It has a postal code of 10510. The residential suburb of Cempaka Putih sprung up in the 1960s with the completion of Jakarta Bypass, the prototype of Jakarta Inner Ring Road.

== See also ==
- List of administrative villages of Jakarta
