= Jakarta–Cikampek II South Toll Road =

Toll road in Indonesia

Jakarta-Cikampek II South Toll Road

Route information
- Part of AH2
- Maintained by PT Jasamarga Japek Selatan (PT Jasa Marga Tbk and PT Wira Nusantara Bumi}
- Length: 62 km (39 mi)

Major junctions
- West end: Jatiasih
- Jakarta Outer Ring Road; Jakarta Outer Ring Road 2; Purbaleunyi Toll Road
- East end: Sadang Interchange

Location
- Country: Indonesia
- Provinces: West Java
- Major cities: Bekasi; Bekasi Regency; Karawang Regency; Purwakarta Regency

Highway system
- Transport in Indonesia

Jakarta-Cikampek II South Toll Road is an under-construction controlled-access toll road which connects Jakarta Outer Ring Road at Jatiasih and Purbaleunyi Toll Road at Sadang in Java, Indonesia. The goal of constructing this toll road is to reduce frequent congestion in Jakarta-Cikampek Toll Road, which will also serve as an alternative route from Jakarta to Bandung and vice versa. The toll road is 62 kilometres (39 mi) long, and will have gates at Jatiasih, Bantar Gebang, Setu, Tunggilis, Sukaragam, Taman Mekar, Kutanegara, and Sadang. The toll road is a complementary road for Trans-Java Toll Road, and is expected to be operational by 2024.

== Sections ==
The toll road has three sections,

- Section 1: Jati Asih - Setu, 9.3 km (5.8 mi)
- Section 2: Setu - Taman Mekar, 24.85 km (15.44 mi)
- Section 3: Taman Mekar - Sadang, 27.85 km (17.31 mi)

== See also ==
- Trans-Java toll road
