= Srengseng, Kembangan =

Srengseng
- Interactive map of Srengseng
- Country: Indonesia
- Province: DKI Jakarta
- Administrative city: West Jakarta
- District: Kembangan

Area
  - Total: 4.91 km^{2} (1.90 sq mi)

Population
  - Total: 53,627
  - Density: 10,900/km^{2} (28,300/sq mi)
- Postal code: 11630

Srengseng is an administrative village in the Kembangan district, city of West Jakarta, Indonesia. It has postal code of 11630.

== See also ==
- Kembangan
- List of administrative villages of Jakarta
