= South Meruya =

Meruya Selatan
- Administrative village
- Interactive map of Meruya Selatan
- Country: Indonesia
- Province: DKI Jakarta
- Regency: Jakarta
- Subdistrict: Kembangan

Area
  - Total: 2.8 km^{2} (1.1 sq mi)

Population
  - Total: 38,388
  - Density: 14,000/km^{2} (36,000/sq mi)
- Postal code: 11650

Meruya Selatan (Indonesian for South Meruya) is an administrative village in the Kembangan district, city of West Jakarta, Indonesia. It has postal code of 11650.

== See also ==
- Kembangan
- List of administrative villages of Jakarta
