= Sheikh Mohammed bin Zayed Skyway =

Elevated Toll Road in Indonesia

Sheikh Mohammed bin Zayed Skyway Jakarta–Cikampek Elevated Toll Road
- Jalan Layang Sheikh Mohammed bin Zayed; Jalan Tol Layang Jakarta-Cikampek
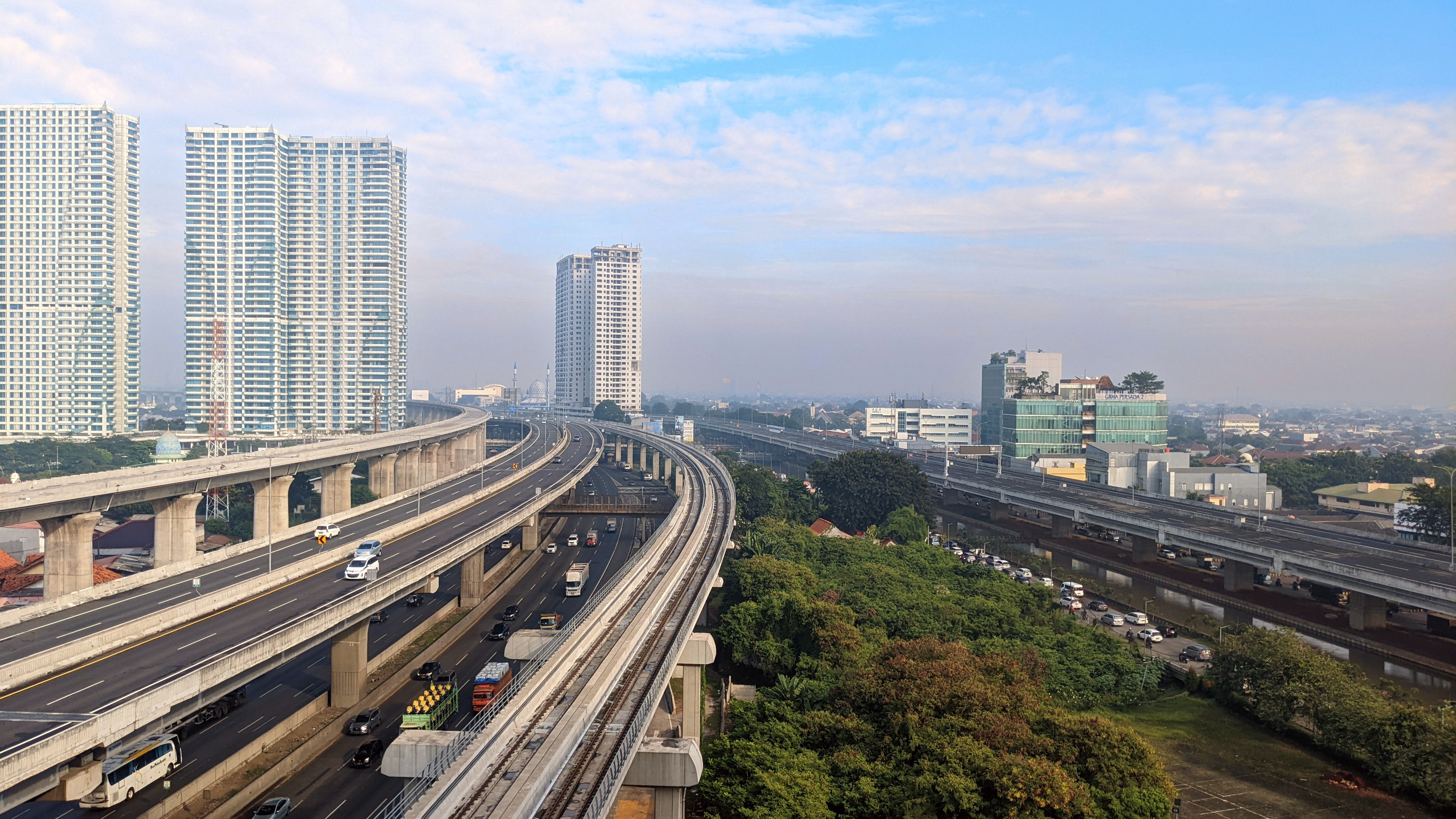
- The Sheikh Mohamed bin Zayed Skyway (two from left) above the Jakarta–Cikampek Toll Road, flanked by Whoosh and the Jabodebek LRT viaducts

Route information
- Part of AH2
- Maintained by PT Jasamarga Jalanlayang Cikampek (JJC) (PT Jasa Marga Tbk, Nusantara Infrastructure, PT Ranggi Sugiron Perkasa)
- Length: 36.4 km (22.6 mi)
- Existed: 2019–present

Major junctions
- West end: Cikunir
- Jakarta–Cikampek Toll Road; Jakarta Outer Ring Road
- East end: Karawang

Location
- Country: Indonesia
- Major cities: Bekasi; Karawang Regency

Highway system
- Transport in Indonesia

The Sheikh Mohammed bin Zayed Skyway (abbreviated MBZ Skyway), formerly (and still colloquially) known as the Jakarta–Cikampek Elevated Toll Road, is a 36.4-kilometre-long (22.6 mi) elevated controlled-access toll road that extends from Cikunir, Bekasi, to Karawang in West Java, Indonesia, operated by PT Jasamarga Jalanlayang Cikampek, a subsidiary of PT Jasa Marga Tbk and PT Nusantara Infrastructure Tbk (controlled by Metro Pacific Investments) with PT Ranggi Sugiron Perkasa as minority shareholder. It passes over some sections of the existing Jakarta–Cikampek Toll Road. It is the longest flyover in Indonesia and the longest elevated double-decker expressway in Southeast Asia.

The toll road was opened by President Joko Widodo on 11 December 2019 and was renamed after the current President of the United Arab Emirates Mohammed bin Zayed Al Nahyan on 8 April 2021 at the behest of the President's secretary as a "thank-you" for the government of Abu Dhabi naming one of its roads as President Joko Widodo Street.

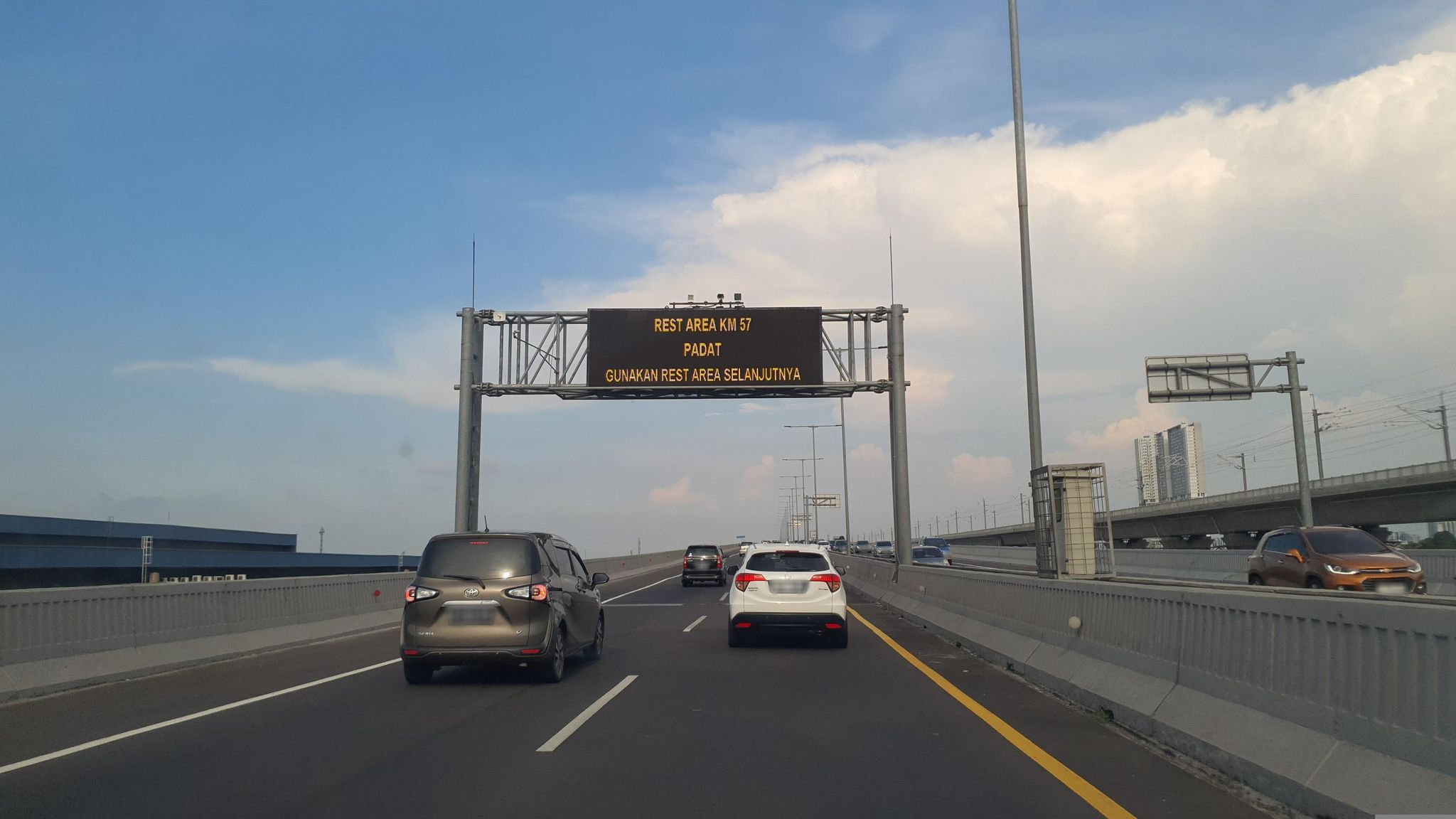
The skyline Highway on the road

The elevated toll road is designed for private vehicles only. It is built to ease traffic congestion within the Greater Jakarta area and reduce the burden on the existing Jakarta–Cikampek toll road.

== Exits ==
Province	Location	km	mi	Exit	Name	Destinations	Notes
West Java	West Bekasi, Bekasi	10	6.2	10	Cikunir Interchange	Exit to Jakarta Outer Ring Road; Southwestbound; Jatiasih; Jatiwarna; Jagorawi Toll Road; Northbound; Pondok Kelapa; Bintara; Port of Tanjung Priok; Westbound; Pondok Gede; Halim Perdanakusuma International Airport; Cawang	Western terminus
West Java	East Telukjambe, Karawang Regency	48.0	29.8	48	West Karawang Ramp	East Karawang; Purbaleunyi Toll Road; Cikopo–Palimanan Toll Road	Eastern terminus
1.000 mi = 1.609 km; 1.000 km = 0.621 mi: Route transition

== See also ==
- List of longest bridges
