= North Meruya =

Meruya Utara
- Administrative village
- Interactive map of Meruya Utara
- Country: Indonesia
- Province: DKI Jakarta
- Regency: Jakarta
- Subdistrict: Kembangan

Area
  - Total: 4.33 km^{2} (1.67 sq mi)

Population
  - Total: 52,447
  - Density: 12,100/km^{2} (31,400/sq mi)
- Postal code: 11620

Meruya Utara (Indonesian for North Meruya, also known as Meruya Ilir) is an administrative village in the Kembangan district, city of West Jakarta, Indonesia. It has postal code of 11620.

== See also ==
- Kembangan
- List of administrative villages of Jakarta
