= Rawasari, Cempaka Putih =

Administrative village in Central Jakarta, Indonesia

Rawasari
- Administrative village (Kelurahan)
- Location within Jakarta
- Coordinates: 6.1912°S 106.8715°E
- Country: Indonesia
- Province: DKI Jakarta
- Administrative city: Central Jakarta
- District: Cempaka Putih
- Postal code: 10570

Rawasari is an administrative village (kelurahan) in the Cempaka Putih district of Central Jakarta, Indonesia. It is a vital residential and educational corridor that serves as the gateway between Central and East Jakarta.

== History ==
The name Rawasari is a portmanteau of the Indonesian words Rawa (swamp) and Sari (essence). Historically, this region was part of the Central Jakarta wetlands. Development began in the early 1950s to accommodate urban expansion.

From the late 1970s until the mid-2000s, Rawasari was nationally recognized as Jakarta’s premier ceramic and tile trading hub. While the trade has largely decentralized, the area remains a significant commercial landmark for building materials.

== Geography ==
Rawasari is situated on the eastern edge of Central Jakarta. It features a mix of mid-century residential architecture and modern high-rise developments.

=== Boundaries ===
The village is bordered by several major arterial roads and districts:

- North: Kelurahan Cempaka Putih Barat.
- East: Jalan Jenderal Ahmad Yani (Bypass), bordering Pulogadung, East Jakarta.
- South: Jalan Pramuka, bordering Matraman, East Jakarta.
- West: Jalan Percetakan Negara, bordering Johar Baru.

== Infrastructure and Facilities ==
The village is a major hub for healthcare and tertiary education in the city:

- Healthcare: Jakarta Islamic Hospital (Rumah Sakit Islam Jakarta) and Pertamina Jaya Hospital are located here or immediately adjacent.
- Education: The area houses or is adjacent to YARSI University, Trisakti University (Campus F), and Jayabaya University.
- Modern Development: The Green Pramuka City complex is a significant residential and commercial landmark in the eastern part of the village.

== Transportation ==
Rawasari is served by several TransJakarta corridors, including Route 4 (Pulo Gadung – Dukuh Atas) and Route 10 (Tanjung Priok – PGC). The Ir. Wiyoto Wiyono Toll Road provides high-speed access to the Tanjung Priok port and the southern city limits.

== See also ==
- List of administrative villages of Jakarta
