= Kembangan, Jakarta =

District in West Jakarta, Indonesia

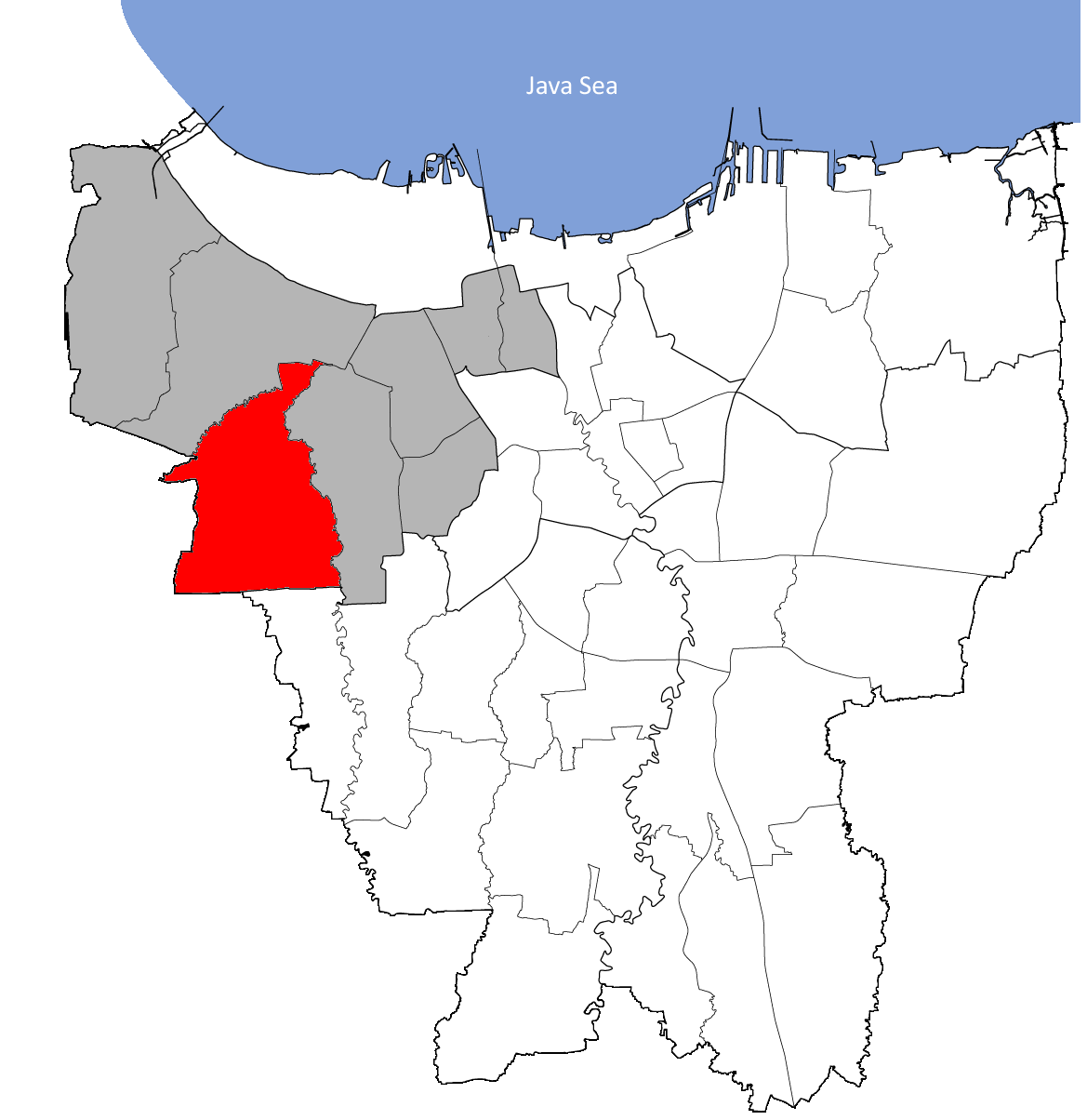
Kembangan in West Jakarta

Kembangan is a district in West Jakarta, Indonesia. Kembangan is bounded by Pesanggrahan Subdistrict (South Jakarta) to the south, Tangerang Regency to the south and west, Cengkareng Subdistrict (West Jakarta) to the north, and Kebon Jeruk Subdistrict (West Jakarta) to the east. The City Hall of West Jakarta is located in this district.

== Kelurahan (Administrative Villages) ==
The district of Kembangan is divided into six kelurahan or administrative villages :

- Kembangan Utara - area code 11610
- Kembangan Selatan - area code 11610
- Meruya Utara - area code 11620
- Meruya Selatan - area code 11650
- Srengseng - area code 11630
- Joglo - area code 11640

== Notable places ==
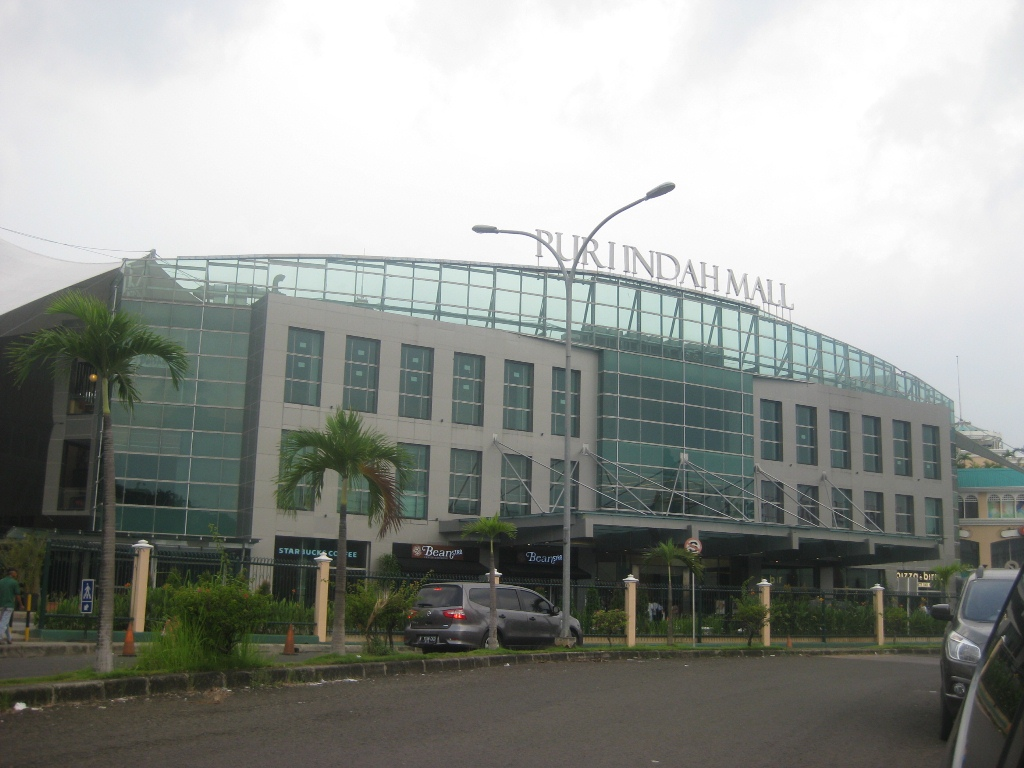
Puri Indah Mall

- Puri Indah: The Puri Indah area is 180 hectares and is a CBD area that will consist of five star hotels, apartments, suites office towers, convention & exhibition center, international hospitals and luxury shopping malls. It was developed and maintained by Pondok Indah Group.
- St. Moritz: St. Moritz Apartment & Residences is a Super-block project by the Lippo Group located in the business center of Puri Indah.
- West Jakarta City Hall
- Pondok Indah Hospital Puri Indah
- Srengseng City Forest
- Notre Dame school
- IPEKA Puri school
- Springfield School
- Mercu Buana University

== Toll Road Access ==
| Toll Road | Toll Gate | KM |
|---|---|---|
| Jakarta–Tangerang Toll Road | Meruya | 06 |
| Jakarta Outer Ring Road | Kembangan Utara | 07 |

== Transport ==
=== City Bus (Transjakarta) ===
- 3E Sentraland Cengkareng - Puri Indah Mall
- 1M North Meruya - Terminal Blok M
- 8D Joglo - Terminal Blok M

=== MRT Jakarta (Future) ===
- MRT Jakarta (Future Planned) Kembangan - Medan Satria part of Cikarang To Balaraja Route
- MRT Jakarta (Future Planned) PIK - Kp Rambutan - Tanjung Priok Along the JORR Toll Road

=== KRL Commuter Line ===
- Tangerang - Duri (available at the Taman Kota Station)

=== LRT Jakarta (Future) ===
- LRT Jakarta (Pulogebang - Tangerang Line) Pulogebang - Hasyim Ashari
