= Malay Village =

Coordinates: 1°18′59.4″N 103°53′45.6″E

- Kampung Melayu
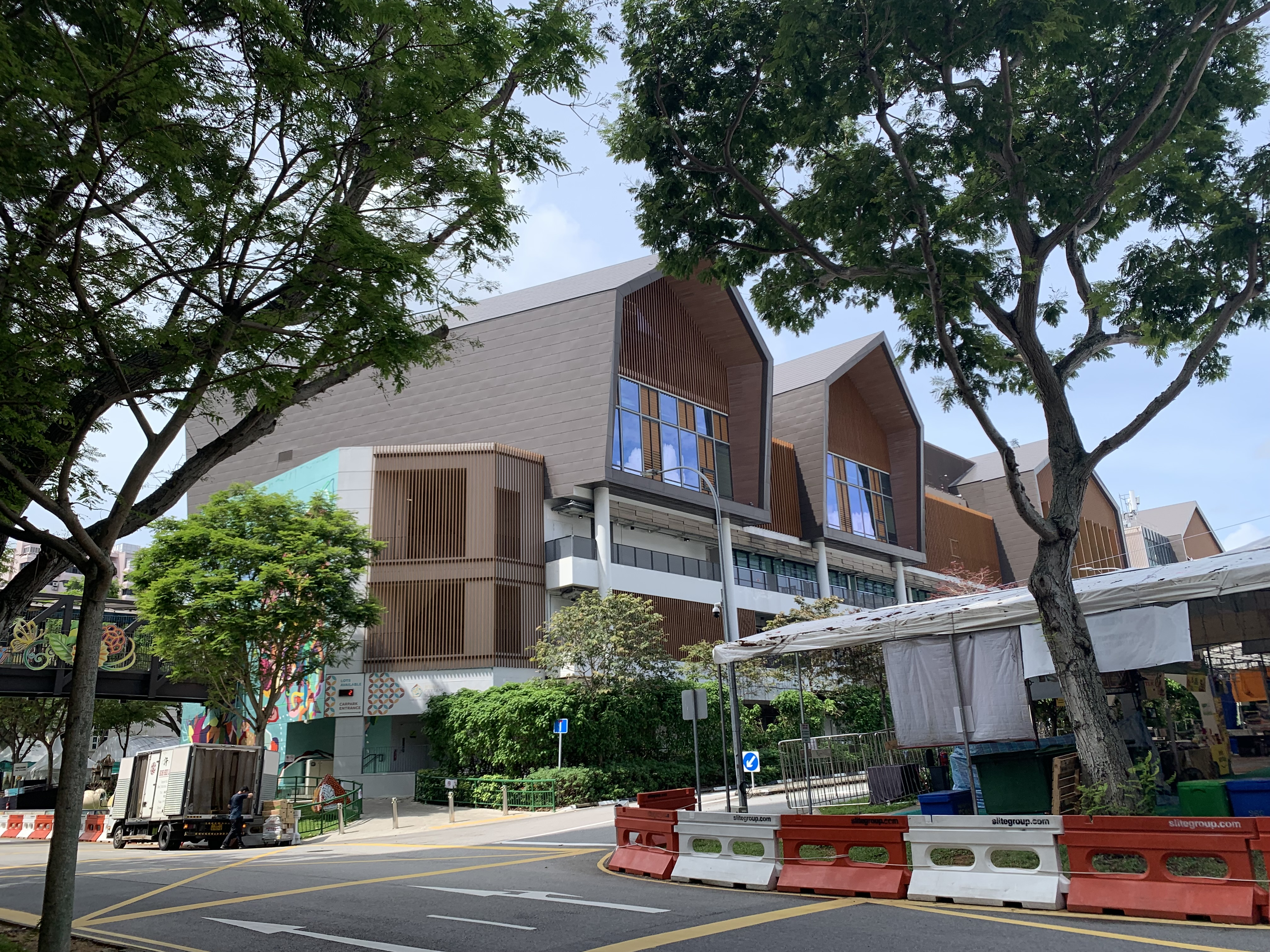
- Wisma Geylang Serai in 2025, it sits on the land that once was the Malay Village

- Location within Singapore
- Former name: Malay Cultural Village
- Established: 25 February 1990; 36 years ago
- Dissolved: 26 September 2011; 14 years ago
- Location: Geylang, Singapore
- Type: history museum

This is a museum in Singapore. For description of Malay villages, see kampung.

The Malay Village (Malay: Kampung Melayu), predecessor of present day Wisma Geylang Serai, was a museum once located in Geylang, Singapore, where they showcases the life of the Malays who used to live in the area before redevelopment in the 1960s.

== History ==
In the 1960s, Geylang was being redeveloped with the completion of many Housing Development Board (HDB) flats, light industrial estates and complexes. Majlis Pusat, the umbrella body for Malay cultural groups proposed an idea of a Malay village in the 1970s. The purpose is to showcase Malay culture to visitors and to provide a place for selling Malay souvenirs. The suggested location is Pasir Panjang. In August 1980, Ahmad Mattar, the Minister-in-charge of Muslim Affairs, announced plans for the village which the then Minister for National Development, Teh Cheang Wan, gives approval in principle in November 1981. The official approval was given by the Government in February 1984 with Geylang as the chosen site.

The construction of the village began in 1986 and completed in November 1989 and it costs the HDB $10 million. In 1990, the Malay Cultural Month was held during its opening from 25 February to 24 March. In September 1991, the Ananda group of companies, run by Hong Kong businessman Clarence Cheung, won the tender with a bid of $3.8 million to run the Malay Village. Plans were proposed to build a $10 million high-tech Islamic cultural museum in the village which did not materialise. Tender for the shops were open in 1992 but only eight shops out of 70 were open with seven out of 45 successful bidders pull out. An advisory panel was also formed.

In 2006, a new management, Malay Village Pte Ltd, took over the village and makes a police report with regards to the Malay Village's accounts. However the village has already a six-digit debt with insufficient funds to pay it. In 2008, Malay Village Pte Ltd announces plans to revive the place. However, Urban Redevelopment Authority (URA), in the same year, announced plans to demolish the Malay Village after its lease ends in 2011 and to build a suburban commercial hub which includes a civic centre, a 2,000 sq m open plaza space, commercial developments and a new road. Appeals to the URA by shop tenants, management and Marine Parade GRC's Member of Parliament, Fatimah Lateef, were rejected.

On 17 November 2010, an Eid al-Adha ritual, organised by the Inter-racial and religious confidence circle of Kampong Ubi Kembangan and Geylang Serai, was held at the Malay Village. It was the first time the ritual was performed there. The Malay Village was chosen as it was the operation centre of Mini Environment Service, the Government's appointed korban vendor.

== Closure and demolition ==
After 23 years of history, the museum was shut down on 26 September 2011. The structure was eventually demolished in 2012 to make way for a new complex known as Wisma Geylang Serai, which was slated to open in May 2018.

The Wisma Geylang Serai was officially opened on 26 January 2019 by Lee Hsien Loong, the 3rd Prime Minister of Singapore.

== See also ==
- Istana Kampong Glam
- Malay Heritage Centre
- Kampong Glam
