= South Kembangan =

- Administrative village
- Location in Jakarta
- Coordinates: 6.187464°S 106.741189°E
- Country: Indonesia
- Province: Jakarta
- City: West Jakarta
- District: Kembangan

Area
  - Total: 3.61 km^{2} (1.39 sq mi)

Population
  - Total: 32,193
  - Density: 8,920/km^{2} (23,100/sq mi)
- Post code: 11610
- Area code: (+62) 21

South Kembangan is an administrative village in Kembangan, West Jakarta, Indonesia. Its postal code is 11610.

== See also ==
- Kembangan
