= Benda, Tangerang =

Benda
- Town and district
- Interactive map of Benda
- Coordinates: 06°07′59″S 106°40′54″E
- Country: Indonesia
- Province: Banten
- Municipality: Tangerang City
- Established: 14 August 1992

Area
  - Total: 5.92 km^{2} (2.29 sq mi)

Population (mid 2023 estimate)
  - Total: 85,769
  - Density: 14,500/km^{2} (37,500/sq mi)

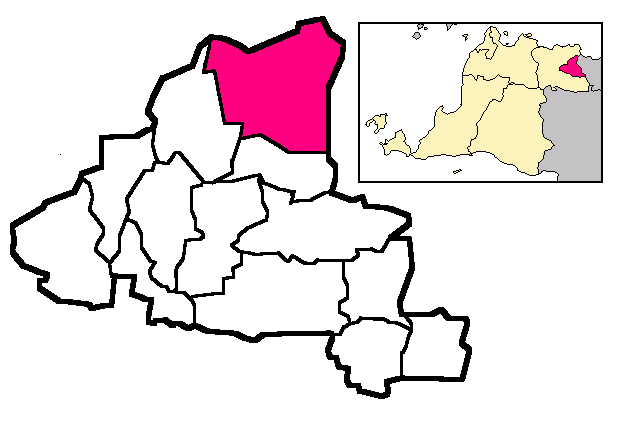
Location of Benda in Tangerang

Benda is a town and an administrative district (kecamatan) of Tangerang City, in Banten Province of Indonesia, on the island of Java. The district covers an area of 5.92 km^{2}, and had a population of 83,017 at the 2010 Census and 83,526 at the 2020 Census; the official estimate as at mid 2023 was 85,769. Jakarta's main international airport, Soekarno–Hatta International Airport is located in the district.

== History ==
Benda was previously part of Batuceper district before it was split off from the northern part of the district in 1992.

== Communities ==
Benda District is sub-divided into five urban communities (kelurahan), listed below with their areas and their officially-estimated populations as at mid 2022, together with their postcodes.

Kode Wilayah	Name of kelurahan	Area in km^{2}	Population mid 2022 estimate	Post code
36.71.04.1001	Belendung	2.77	23,660	15123
36.71.04.1002	Jurumudi	2.00	19,334	15124
36.71.04.1003	Benda (town)	3.08	12,506	15125
36.71.04.1004	Pajang	0.62	8,087	15126
36.71.04.1005	Jurumudi Baru	2.04	21,359	15124
36.71.04	Totals	10.44	84,946 ^{(a)}	

Notes: (a) comprising 43,133 males and 41,813 females.
