= Jakarta Outer Ring Road =

Road encircling Jakarta, Indonesia

- Jalan Tol Lingkar Luar Jakarta
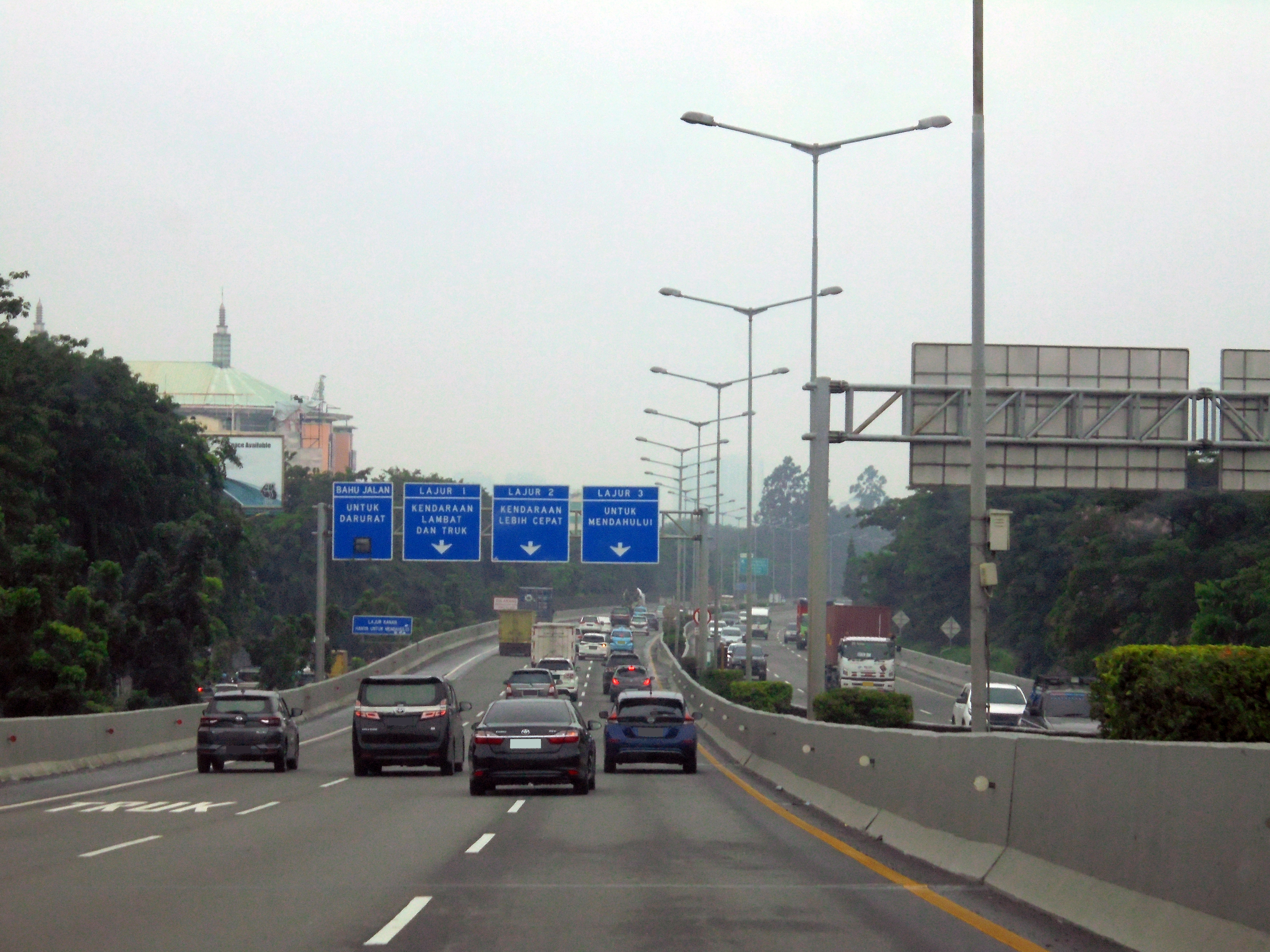
- Southbound Jakarta Outer Ring Road heading to Kembangan, West Jakarta in 2023

Route information
- Maintained by: Penjaringan–Kembangan: Jakarta Lingkar Baratsatu (Bangun Tjipta Sarana, Marga Utama Nusantara); Kembangan–Ulujami: Marga Lingkar Jakarta (Jasa Marga and Astra Infra); Ulujami–TMII/Cilincing–Tanjung Priok: Hutama Karya; TMII–Cilincing: Jalantol Lingkarluar Jakarta (Jasa Marga)
- Length: 65 km (40 mi)
- Existed: 10 October 1990–present

Major junctions
- West end: Penjaringan
- Prof. Dr. Ir. Soedijatmo Toll Road; AH2 – Jakarta–Tangerang Toll Road; Jakarta–Serpong Toll Road; Depok–Antasari Toll Road; Jagorawi Toll Road; Jakarta-Cikampek II South Toll Road (under construction); AH2 – Jakarta-Cikampek Toll Road/Sheikh Mohammed bin Zayed Skyway; Jakarta Inner Ring Road
- East end: Tanjung Priok

Location
- Country: Indonesia
- Provinces: DKI Jakarta; West Java
- Major cities: West Jakarta; South Jakarta; East Jakarta; Bekasi; North Jakarta

Highway system
- Transport in Indonesia

The Jakarta Outer Ring Road (Indonesian: Jalan Tol Lingkar Luar Jakarta, abbreviated JORR) is a controlled-access toll road encircling Jakarta, Indonesia. It is divided into 7 sections, totalling up to 65 kilometres (40 mi). The JORR is managed by four toll road companies: Jakarta Lingkar Baratsatu, Marga Lingkar Jakarta, Hutama Karya and Jalantol Lingkarluar Jakarta.

== Sections ==
Section	Route	Length	Opened
JORR W1	Penjaringan–Kembangan	8.65 km (5.37 mi)	2010
JORR W2 Section 1	Kembangan–Joglo	5.61 km (3.49 mi)	2013
JORR W2 Section 2	Joglo–Ciledug(Petukangan)	2.04 km (1.27 mi)	2014
JORR W2 Section 3	Petukangan–Tanah Kusir	1.30 km (0.81 mi)	2005
JORR S	Tanah Kusir–Jagorawi (TB Simatupang Toll Road)	17.00 km (10.56 mi)	1995
JORR E1 Section 1	Kampung Rambutan–Ceger	1 km (0.62 mi)	2003
JORR E1 Section 2	Ceger–Hankam	3.1 km (1.9 mi)	2003
JORR E1 Section 3	Hankam–Jati Asih	4.4 km (2.7 mi)	2006
JORR E1 Section 4	Jati Asih–Cikunir Interchange	3.9 km (2.4 mi)	2007
JORR E2	Cikunir Interchange–Cakung	9.07 km (5.64 mi)	1990
JORR E3	Cakung–Cilincing	4.8 km (3.0 mi)	2007
JORR N	Cilincing–Tanjung Priok	5 km (3.1 mi)	2017

== Fee ==
PT Jakarta Lingkar Barat Satu, JORR toll road operator of section West 1

Integrated fare effective from July 13, 2018
Group I	Group II	Group III	Group IV	Group V
Rp 16000	Rp 23500	Rp 23500	Rp 31500	Rp 31500

== Exits ==
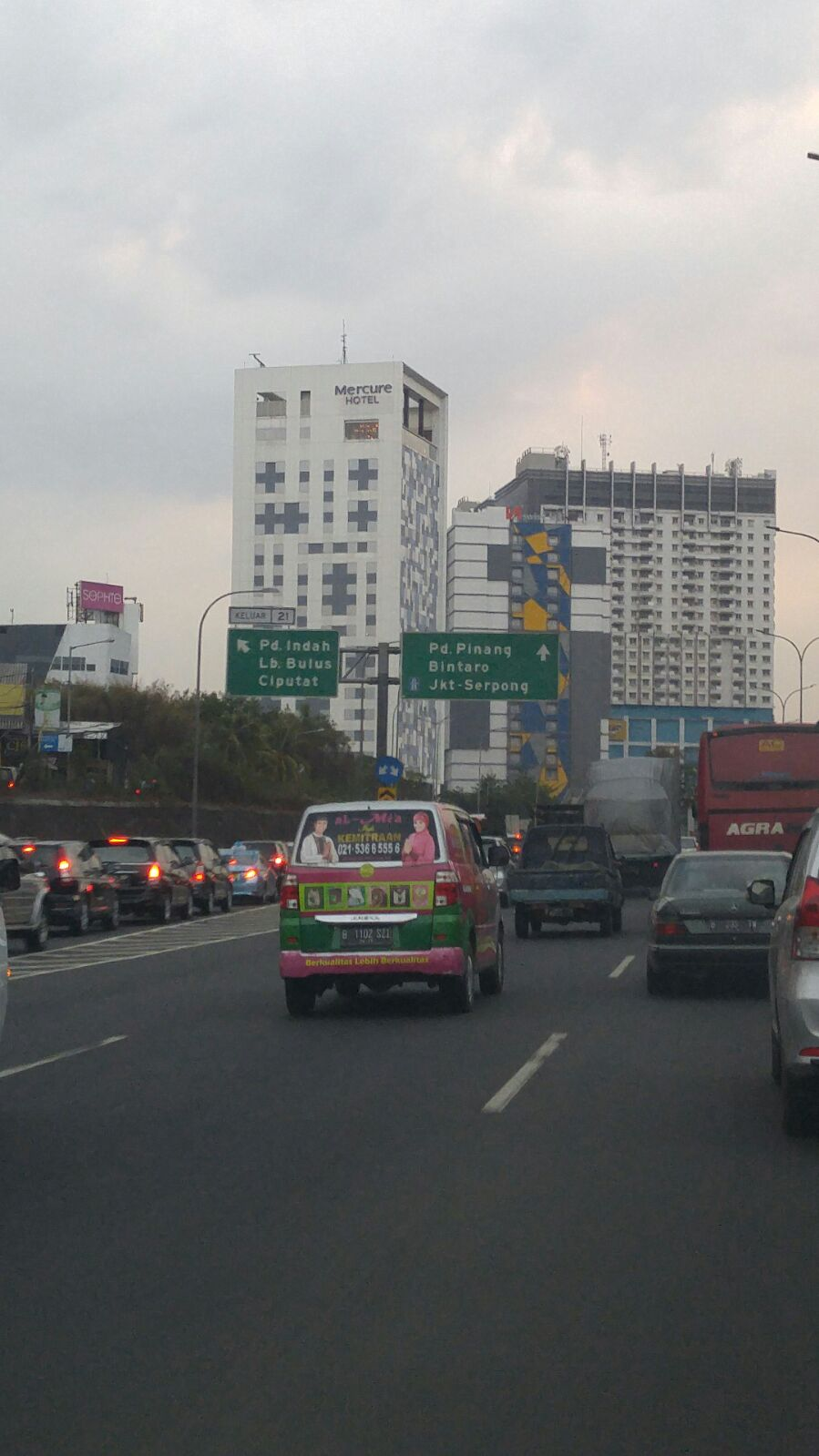
Jakarta Outer Ring Road in Pondok Indah

Notes: Direction of the toll road is in looping manner.

Province	Location	km	mi	Exit	Name	Destinations	Notes
Special Capital Region of Jakarta	Penjaringan, North Jakarta	0.0	0.0	00	Kamal Interchange	Prof. Dr. Ir. Soedijatmo Toll Road; Westbound; Jakarta Outer Ring Road 2; Soekarno-Hatta International Airport; Northbound; Pantai Indah Kapuk; Eastbound; Pluit; Jakarta Inner Ring Road	Northwestern terminus
Special Capital Region of Jakarta	Cengkareng, West Jakarta	1.00	0.62	01	Cengkareng Ramp	Cengkareng; South Kamal; Kapuk	Northwest-bound exit only
Special Capital Region of Jakarta	Cengkareng, West Jakarta	1.5	0.93		Kayu Besar 1 Toll Gate		Southeast-bound entry only
Special Capital Region of Jakarta	Cengkareng, West Jakarta	3.6	2.2	04	Rawa Buaya Ramp	Daan Mogot; Rawa Buaya; Kalideres	
Special Capital Region of Jakarta	Cengkareng, West Jakarta	4.0	2.5		Rawa Buaya Utara Toll Gate		Northwest-bound entry only
Special Capital Region of Jakarta	Cengkareng, West Jakarta	4.6	2.9		Rawa Buaya Selatan Toll Gate		Southeast-bound entry only
Special Capital Region of Jakarta	Kembangan, West Jakarta	7.1	4.4	07	Kembangan Ramp	Kembangan; Meruya; Duri Kosambi	
Special Capital Region of Jakarta	Kembangan, West Jakarta	7.2	4.5		Kembangan Utara Toll Gate		Northwest-bound entry only
Special Capital Region of Jakarta	Kembangan, West Jakarta	7.9	4.9	08	Kembangan Interchange	Jakarta–Merak Toll Road; Eastbound; Kebon Jeruk; Tomang; Jakarta Inner Ring Road; Westbound; Karangtengah; Tangerang; Port of Merak	
Special Capital Region of Jakarta	Kembangan, West Jakarta	9.6	6.0	09	Meruya Selatan Toll Gate	Meruya; Srengseng	
Special Capital Region of Jakarta	Kembangan, West Jakarta	11.5	7.1	11	Joglo Toll Gate	Joglo; Kelapa Dua	
Special Capital Region of Jakarta	Pesanggrahan, South Jakarta	13.6	8.5	13	Ciledug Toll Gate	Ciledug; Larangan; Petukangan; Kebayoran Lama	
Special Capital Region of Jakarta	Pesanggrahan, South Jakarta	15.9	9.9	16	Ulujami Interchange	Jakarta–Serpong Toll Road; Pondok Aren; Serpong	
Special Capital Region of Jakarta	Pesanggrahan, South Jakarta	16.6	10.3	16	Veteran Toll Gate	Tanah Kusir; Bintaro; Rempoa	
Special Capital Region of Jakarta	Pesanggrahan, South Jakarta	18.6	11.6	19	Ciputat Ramp	Pondok Pinang; Pondok Pinang; Lebak Bulus	
Special Capital Region of Jakarta	Pesanggrahan, South Jakarta	18.9	11.7		Ciputat 2 Toll Gate		Northwest-bound entry only
Special Capital Region of Jakarta	Kebayoran Lama, South Jakarta	19.9	12.4		Ciputat 1 Toll Gate		Northwest-bound entry only
Special Capital Region of Jakarta	Kebayoran Lama, South Jakarta	21.1	13.1		Pondok Pinang Toll Gate		Southeast-bound only
Special Capital Region of Jakarta	Cilandak, South Jakarta	22.0	13.7	22	Cipete Ramp	Cipete; Pondok Labu	
Special Capital Region of Jakarta	Cilandak, South Jakarta	22.1	13.7		Fatmawati 2 Toll Gate		Northwest-bound entry only
Special Capital Region of Jakarta	Cilandak, South Jakarta	22.9	14.2		Fatmawati 1 Toll Gate		Southeast-bound entry only
Special Capital Region of Jakarta	Cilandak, South Jakarta	23.5	14.6	23	Cilandak Interchange	Depok–Antasari Toll Road; Andara; Brigif; Sawangan	
Special Capital Region of Jakarta	Pasar Minggu, South Jakarta	24.4	15.2	24	Mampang Prapatan Ramp	Mampang Prapatan; Cilandak; Ragunan	
Special Capital Region of Jakarta	Pasar Minggu, South Jakarta	24.6	15.3		Ampera 2 Toll Gate		Northwest-bound entry only
Special Capital Region of Jakarta	Pasar Minggu, South Jakarta	25.3	15.7		Ampera 1 Toll Gate		Eastbound entry only
Special Capital Region of Jakarta	Pasar Minggu, South Jakarta	27.2	16.9	27	Pasar Minggu Ramp	Pasar Minggu; Jagakarsa; Pancoran	
Special Capital Region of Jakarta	Pasar Minggu, South Jakarta	27.2	16.9		Lenteng Agung 2 Toll Gate		
Special Capital Region of Jakarta	Jagakarsa, South Jakarta	28.3	17.6		Lenteng Agung 1 Toll Gate		Eastbound entry only
Special Capital Region of Jakarta	Jagakarsa, South Jakarta	28.7	17.8		Lenteng Agung 3 Toll Gate		Eastbound entry only
Special Capital Region of Jakarta	Pasar Rebo, East Jakarta	30.1	18.7	30	Cijantung Ramp	Cijantung; Kramat Jati; Cililitan	
Special Capital Region of Jakarta	Pasar Rebo, East Jakarta	30.2	18.8		Gedong 2 Toll Gate		Northwest-bound entry only
Special Capital Region of Jakarta	Ciracas, East Jakarta	31.1	19.3		Gedong 1 Toll Gate		Eastbound entry only
Special Capital Region of Jakarta	Ciracas, East Jakarta	32.0	19.9	32	Kampung Rambutan Ramp	Kampung Rambutan Bus Terminal; Ciracas; Taman Mini Indonesia Indah	
Special Capital Region of Jakarta	Ciracas, East Jakarta	32.1	19.9		Kampung Rambutan Toll Gate		Northwest-bound entry only
Special Capital Region of Jakarta	Ciracas, East Jakarta	32.3	20.1	32	Dukuh Interchange	Jagorawi Toll Road; Northbound; Taman Mini Indonesia Indah; Cawang; Jakarta Inner Ring Road; Southbound; Cibubur; Jakarta Outer Ring Road 2; Bogor	
Special Capital Region of Jakarta	Cipayung, East Jakarta	34.0	21.1	34	Bambu Apus Ramp	Bambu Apus; Ceger	
Special Capital Region of Jakarta	Cipayung, East Jakarta	34.1	21.2		Bambu Apus 2 Toll Gate		Westbound entry only
Special Capital Region of Jakarta	Cipayung, East Jakarta	34.7	21.6		Bambu Apus 1 Toll Gate		Northeast-bound entry only
Special Capital Region of Jakarta	Cipayung, East Jakarta	35.6	22.1		Setu Ramp	Setu; Cilangkap; Cipayung	Northeast-bound exit only
Special Capital Region of Jakarta	Cipayung, East Jakarta	35.7	22.2		Setu Toll Gate		Westbound entry only
Special Capital Region of Jakarta	Cipayung, East Jakarta	36.9	22.9	37	Jatiwarna Ramp	Jatiwarna; Kranggan; Pondok Gede	
West Java	Pondok Melati, Bekasi	37.1	23.1		Jatiwarna 2 Toll Gate		Westbound entry only
West Java	Pondok Melati, Bekasi	37.6	23.4		Jatiwarna 1 Toll Gate		Northeast-bound entry only
West Java	Jatiasih, Bekasi	41.0	25.5	41	Jatiasih Toll Gate	Jatiasih; Cikunir; Jatimekar	
West Java	South Bekasi, Bekasi	45.2	28.1	45	Cikunir Interchange	Jakarta–Cikampek Toll Road; Sheikh Mohammed bin Zayed Skyway; Westbound; Pondok Gede; Halim Perdanakusuma International Airport; Jakarta Inner Ring Road; Eastbound; West Bekasi; Cikarang; Bandung	
West Java	West Bekasi, Bekasi	46.9	29.1	47	Kalimalang Toll Gate	Pondok Kelapa; Kranji	
West Java	West Bekasi, Bekasi	49.2	30.6	49	Bintara Toll Gate	Bintara; Pondok Kopi; Klender	
Special Capital Region of Jakarta	Cakung, East Jakarta	50.3	31.3	50	Pulo Gebang Ramp	Pulo Gebang Bus Terminal	
Special Capital Region of Jakarta	Cakung, East Jakarta	50.4	31.3		Pulo Gebang Toll Gate		Southwest-bound entry only
Special Capital Region of Jakarta	Cakung, East Jakarta	53.5	33.2	53	Cakung Toll Gate	Cakung; Pulo Gadung; Kelapa Gading-Pulo Gebang Toll Road	
Special Capital Region of Jakarta	Cakung, East Jakarta	55.0	34.2	55	Cakung Timur Ramp	Cakung; Cilincing	Northeast-bound exit only
Special Capital Region of Jakarta	Cakung, East Jakarta	55.0	34.2		Cakung 2 Toll Gate		Southwest-bound entry only
Special Capital Region of Jakarta	Cilincing, North Jakarta	58.2	36.2	58	Rorotan Toll Gate	Rorotan; Semper; Kawasan Berikat Nusantara	
Special Capital Region of Jakarta	Cilincing, North Jakarta	58.3	36.2	Tanjung Priok Access Toll Road			
1.000 mi = 1.609 km; 1.000 km = 0.621 mi: Electronic toll collection; Incomplete access; Route transition

== See also ==
- Jakarta Outer Ring Road 2
- Jakarta Inner Ring Road
- Jakarta Elevated Toll Road
- Transport in Indonesia
