= 2020 South Tangerang mayoral election =

- 9 December 2020
- Turnout: 60.5%
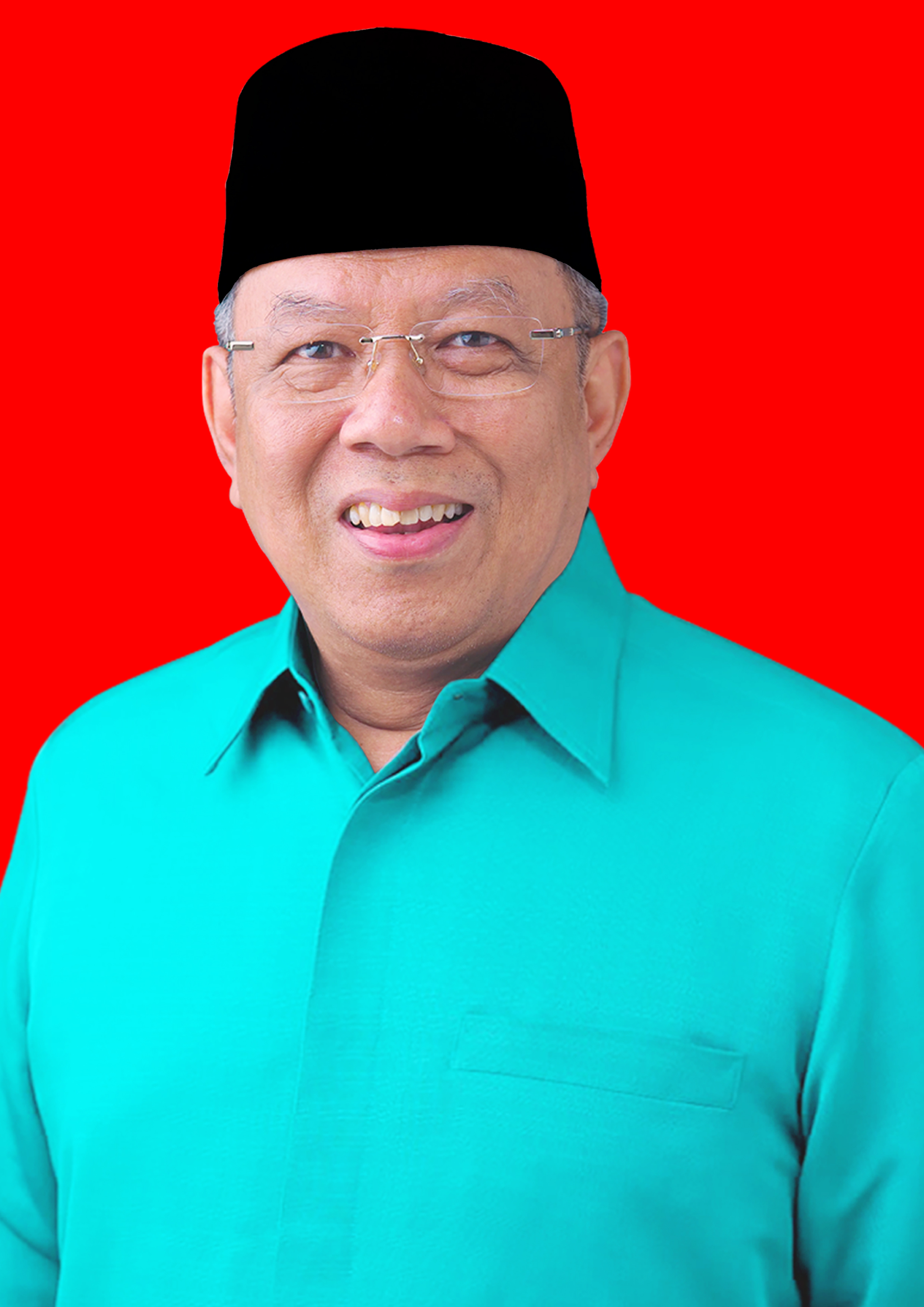

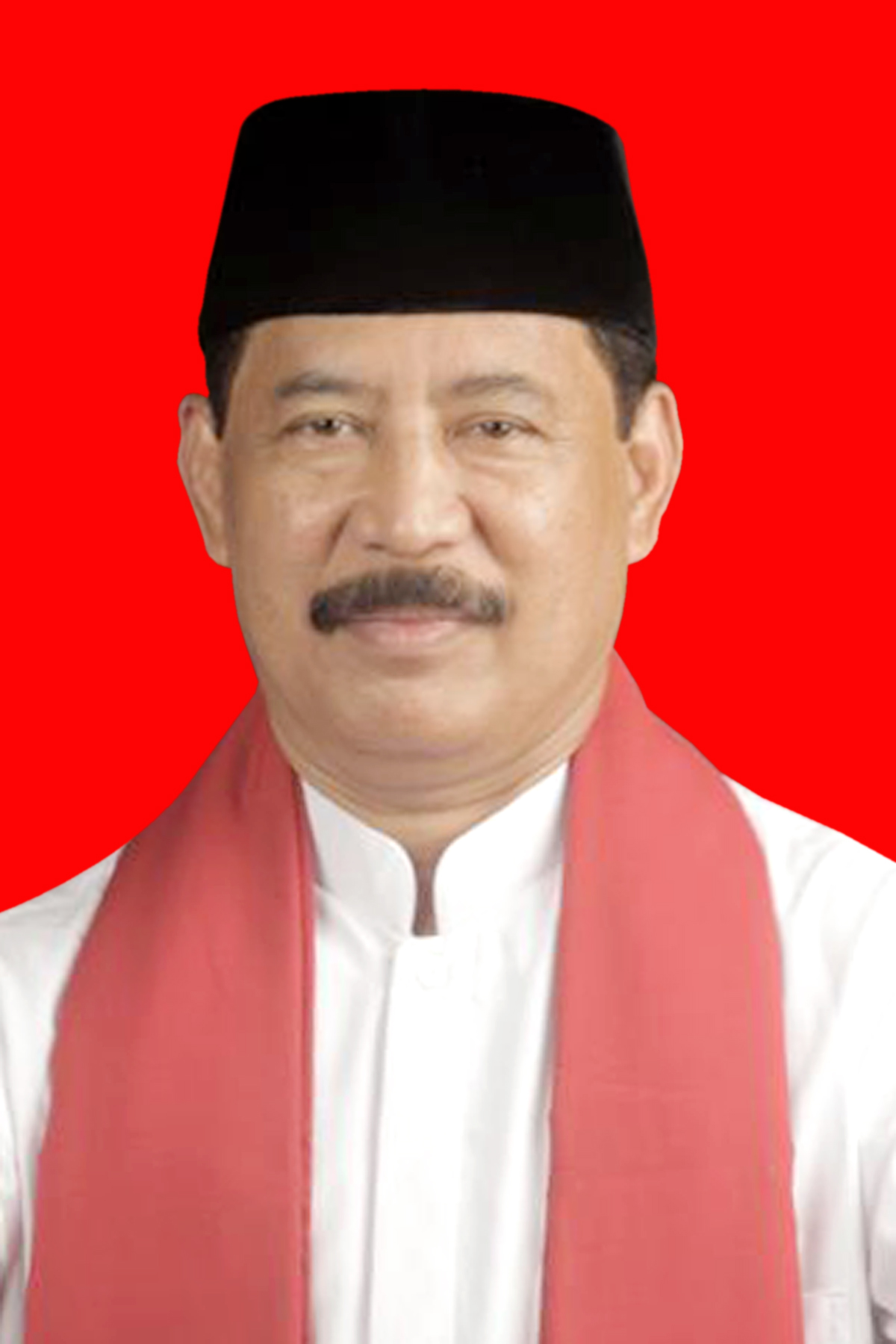

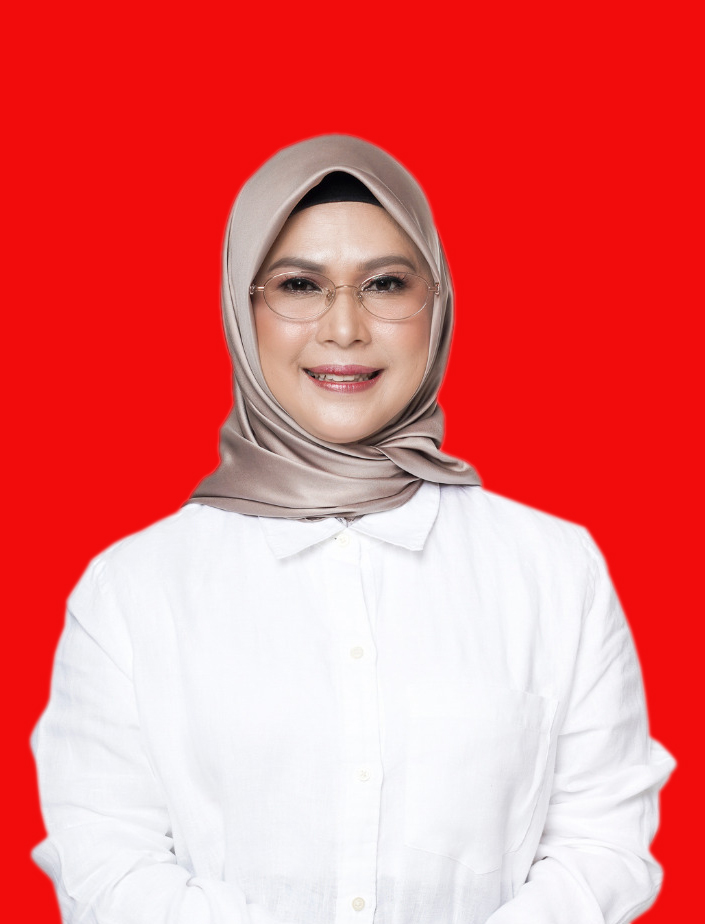
Candidate	Benyamin Davnie	Muhamad	Siti Nur Azizah
Party	Golkar	Independent	Demokrat
Running mate	Pilar Saga Ichsan	Rahayu Saraswati	Ruhamaben
popular vote	235,734	205,309	134,682
Percentage	40.95%	35.66%	23.39%
Supported by	–	PDI-P, Gerindra, PSI, PAN, Hanura	PKS, PKB
- Results by district and subdistrict (Interactive version)
Mayor before election
Airin Rachmi Diany
Golkar
Elected mayor
Benyamin Davnie
Golkar

The 2020 South Tangerang mayoral election was held on 9 December 2020 to elect the mayor of South Tangerang as part of the 2020 Indonesian local elections. The incumbent mayor, Airin Rachmi Diany, was term-limited and couldn't run for re-election. The sitting vice-mayor, Benyamin Davnie of Golkar, was elected in her stead, winning more than 40% of the vote.

== Electoral system ==
The election, like other local elections in 2020, follow the first-past-the-post system where the candidate with the most votes wins the election, even if they do not win a majority. It is possible for a candidate to run uncontested, in which case the candidate is still required to win a majority of votes "against" an "empty box" option. Should the candidate fail to do so, the election will be repeated on a later date.

== Candidates ==
According to electoral regulations, in order to qualify for the election, candidates are required to secure support from a political party or a coalition of parties controlling 10 seats in the South Tangerang Regional House of Representatives (DPRD). Candidates may alternatively demonstrate support to run as an independent in form of photocopies of identity cards, which in South Tangerang's case corresponds to 71,143 copies. No independent candidates registered with the General Elections Commission (KPU).

Incumbent mayor Airin Rachmi Diany had served two terms as mayor, and was therefore ineligible to contest the election.

=== Official ===
The following are candidates which took part in the election, with their ballot numbers and supporting parties:

Ballot number	Candidate	Running mate	Endorsing parties	Seat count
1	Muhamad	Rahayu Saraswati (Gerindra)	PDI-P	8 / 50
1	Muhamad	Rahayu Saraswati (Gerindra)	Gerindra	8 / 50
1	Muhamad	Rahayu Saraswati (Gerindra)	PSI	4 / 50
1	Muhamad	Rahayu Saraswati (Gerindra)	PAN	2 / 50
1	Muhamad	Rahayu Saraswati (Gerindra)	Hanura	1 / 50
2	Siti Nur Azizah (Demokrat)	Ruhamaben (PKS)	PKS	8 / 50
2	Siti Nur Azizah (Demokrat)	Ruhamaben (PKS)	Demokrat	5 / 50
2	Siti Nur Azizah (Demokrat)	Ruhamaben (PKS)	PKB	4 / 50
3	Benyamin Davnie (Golkar)	Pilar Saga Ichsan (Golkar)	Golkar	10 / 50

Muhamad, who was city secretary of South Tangerang until his resignation to run in the election, ran with Rahayu Saraswati, a Gerindra Party politician formerly a member of the House of Representatives between 2014 and 2019. Saraswati was also the nephew of Gerindra's chairman Prabowo Subianto. The pair received the endorsement of Gerindra, PDI-P, Hanura, PAN, and PSI from the DPRD, in addition to four other parties not in the DPRD.

Siti Nur Azizah is a daughter of Vice President of Indonesia Ma'ruf Amin, and deputy secretary general in the Democratic Party. Prior to the election, she had run for a seat in the House of Representatives as a United Development Party candidate, and had worked for 15 years in the Ministry of Religious Affairs beforehand. Her running mate, Ruhamaben from the Prosperous Justice Party, is a former aeronautical engineer who had served in South Tangerang's legislature as its deputy speaker. They were supported by PKS, the Democratic Party, and PKB.

Incumbent two-term vice mayor Benyamin Davnie ran with the support of Golkar and three parties not represented in the city's DPRD. Prior to becoming vice mayor, Davnie had been a bureaucrat in Tangerang's government since 1980 before becoming South Tangerang's vice mayor when the city was split off. His running mate, Pilar Saga Ichsan, is an architect active in the city's development projects with family ties to former Banten governor Ratu Atut Chosiyah.

== Campaign ==
Media outlets described the election as a contest between three political dynasties: those of Prabowo Subianto, Ma'ruf Amin, and of Ratu Atut Chosiyah.

Issues raised in the election included the city's traffic jams, flooding and water quality issues, garbage problems due to lack of a landfill, limited connection of the city's public transit to Jakarta, and high unemployment.

== Polling ==
Poll source	Date	Sample size	Muhamad	Siti	Benyamin
SMRC	August 2020	410	20.8%	10.5%	39.3%
Indikator	October 2020	820	26.7%	13.1%	33.9%

== Results ==
Candidate	Running mate	Party	Votes	%
Benyamin Davnie	Pilar Saga Ichsan	Golkar	235,734	40.95
Muhamad	Rahayu Saraswati	Independent	205,309	35.66
Siti Nur Azizah	Ruhamaben	Democratic Party	134,682	23.39
Total			575,725	100.00
Source: KPU

== Aftermath ==
Analysts attributed Benyamin and Pilar's victory to their affiliation with the incumbent mayor Airin Rachmi, with Benyamin having explicitly campaigned for the continuation of her programs. Both losing candidates filed a lawsuit at the Constitutional Court of Indonesia, which summarily rejected the lawsuit citing the large margin of victory. Davnie and Pilar were sworn in as mayor and vice mayor on 26 April 2021.
