= Global Jaya School =

International School in Indonesia

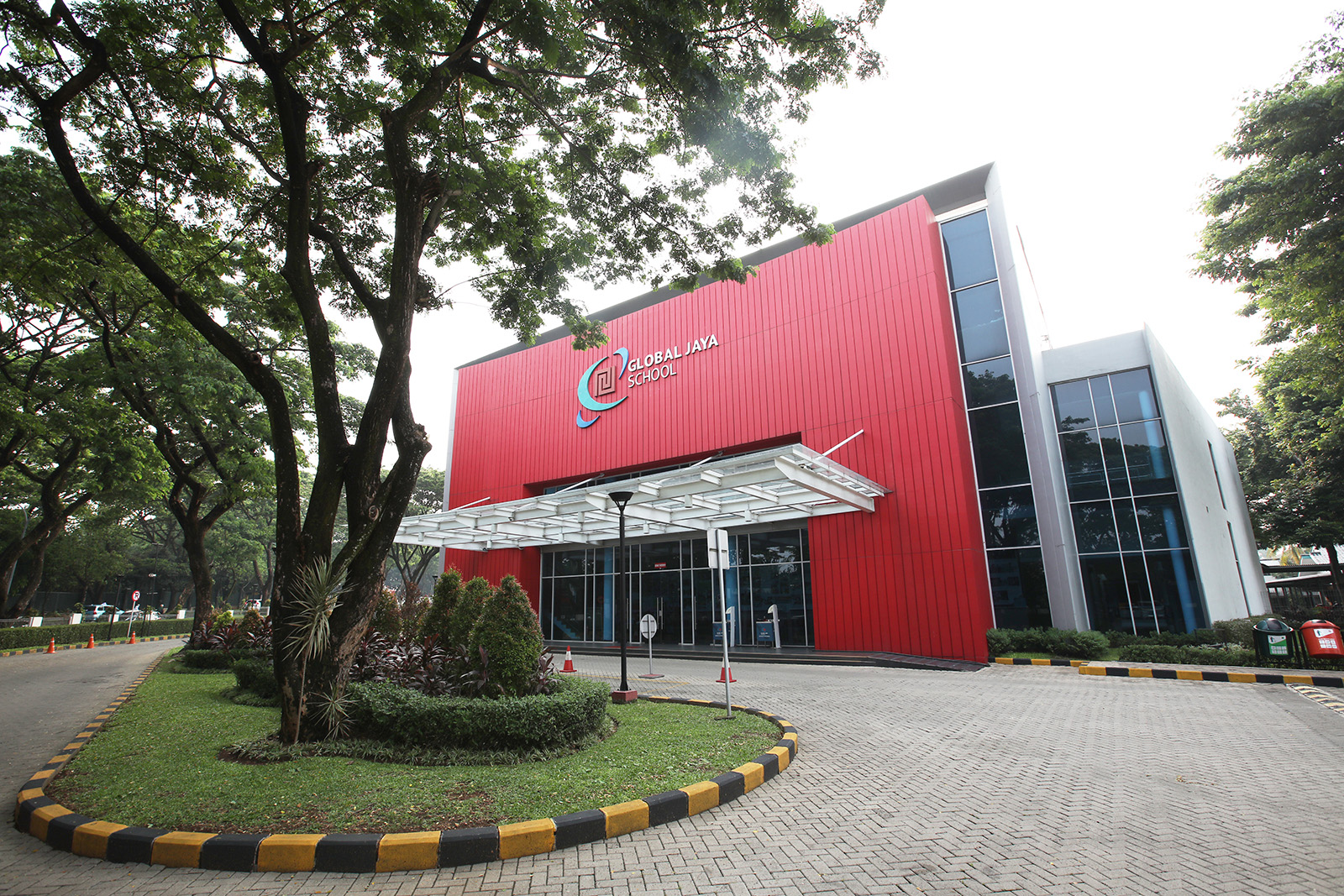
- Global Jaya School Theatre Building Lobby

Location
- Jl. Emerald Boulevard, Bintaro Jaya Sektor 9, Tangerang Selatan, Banten 15227, Indonesia; Indonesia
- Coordinates: 6.281°S 106.699°E

Information
- Type: Private International Baccalaureate World School
- Motto: Gateway to The World
- Established: 1995
- Head of school: Howard Menand - 2024
- Hours in school day: 7.5 hours
- Houses: Elang (Hijau / Green), Garuda (Merah / Red), Rajawali (Biru / Blue)
- Mascot: Hawks
- Accreditation: International Baccalaureate, Western Association of Schools and Colleges
- Website: http://www.globaljaya.com/

The Global Jaya School (GJS) is an international school in Indonesia, located in the outskirts of Jakarta in Pondok Aren district, South Tangerang in the Sector 9 Bintaro Jaya area. The school was established in 1995. It is accredited by the Western Association of Schools and Colleges and is an International Baccalaureate (IB) World School. The school was also previously known as "Sekolah Global Jaya" (SGJ) and "Global Jaya International School" (GJIS). Since the presidency of Joko Widodo in Indonesia, the school is now known as "Global Jaya School".

Global Jaya School offers three International Baccalaureate programmes: the Primary Years Programme, Middle School Programme, and Diploma Programme. The school is a non-denominational community.

== History ==
Global Jaya School was formed on 1995 under the auspices of the Jaya Educational Foundation (Yayasan Pendidikan Jaya), a foundation under the huge Jaya Group company founded by Ciputra. The inaugural year served 107 students, with three early years buildings, outdoor play areas, a swimming pool and use of a multi-purpose gymnasium. The curriculum was based on the national systems of Indonesia and the Ministry of Education and Culture.

From 2004 to 2006, GJS established an international curriculum.

The school has had over 250 staff members, serving 18 nationalities attending Global Jaya, nearly 1000 students in total.

== Notable alumni ==
- Alyssa Soebandono, Indonesian actor and celebrity
- Stephanie Poetri, Indonesian singer songwriter, known for 2019 single "I Love You 3000".

== See also ==
Other international schools in the area include:

- British School Jakarta
- Jakarta Japanese School
