= Coldenhoff =

Coldenhoff is a Dutch surname. Notable people with the surname include:

- Glenn Coldenhoff (born 1991), Dutch motocross racer
- Louise Elisabeth Coldenhoff (1935–2021), Indonesian naval officer
