= 2024 South Tangerang mayoral election =

- 27 November 2024
- Turnout: 57.06% (▼3.23pp)
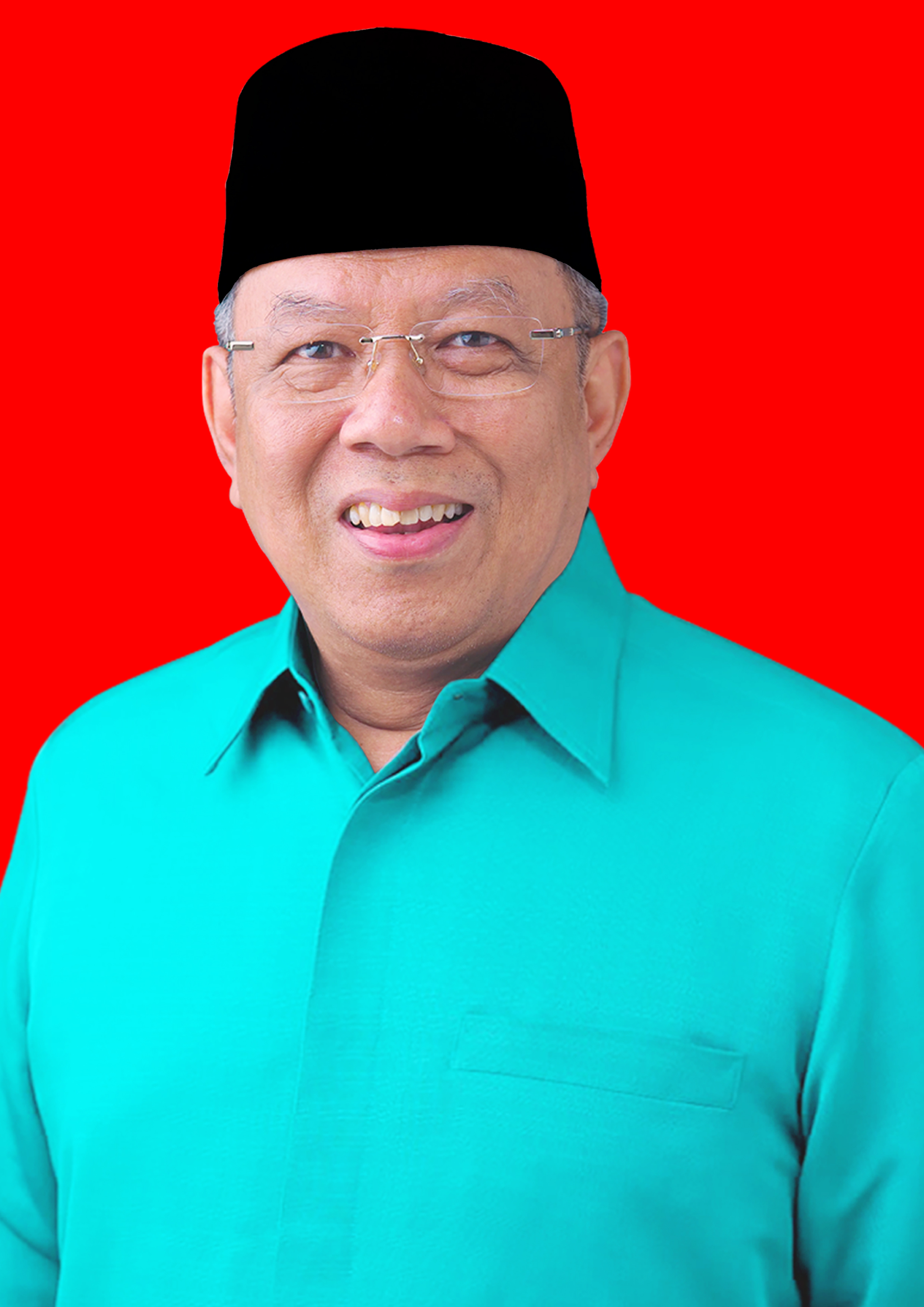

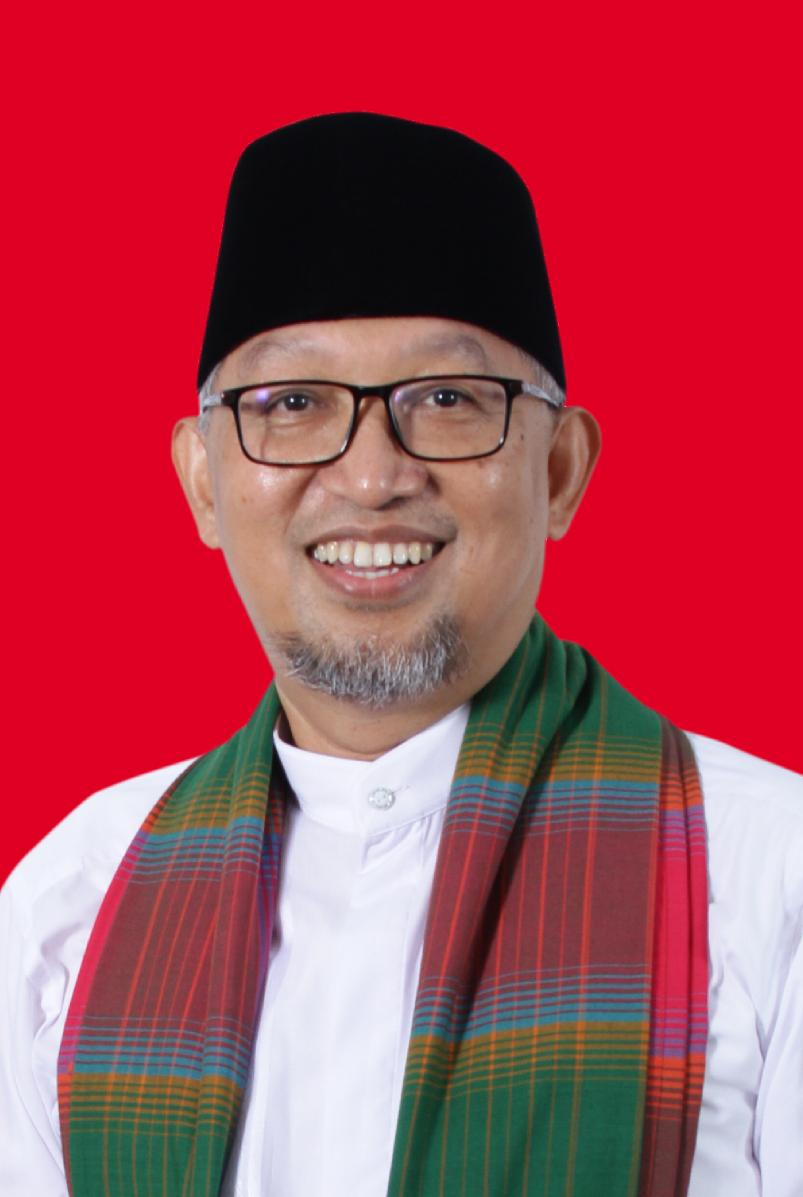
Candidate	Benyamin Davnie	Ruhamaben
Party	Golkar	PKS
Alliance	KIM Plus	–
Running mate	Pilar Saga Ichsan	Shinta Wahyuni
Popular vote	354,027	212,740
Percentage	62.46%	37.54%
- Results by subdistrict
Mayor before election
Benyamin Davnie
Golkar
Elected mayor
Benyamin Davnie
Golkar

The 2024 South Tangerang mayoral election was held on 27 November 2024 as part of nationwide local elections to elect the mayor and vice mayor of South Tangerang for a five-year term. The previous election was held in 2020. Mayor Benyamin Davnie of Golkar defeated Prosperous Justice Party-backed challenger Ruhamaben in a landslide, securing a second term.

== Electoral system ==
The election, like other local elections in 2024, follow the first-past-the-post system where the candidate with the most votes wins the election, even if they do not win a majority. It is possible for a candidate to run uncontested, in which case the candidate is still required to win a majority of votes "against" an "empty box" option. Should the candidate fail to do so, the election will be repeated on a later date.

== Candidates ==
According to electoral regulations, in order to qualify for the election, candidates were required to secure support from a political party or a coalition of parties controlling 10 seats in the South Tangerang Regional House of Representatives (DPRD). Candidates may alternatively demonstrate support to run as an independent in form of photocopies of identity cards, which in South Tangerang's case corresponds to 66,466 copies. No independent candidates registered before the deadline set by KPU.

=== Potential ===
The following are individuals who have either been publicly mentioned as a potential candidate by a political party in the DPRD, publicly declared their candidacy with press coverage, or considered as a potential candidate by media outlets:

- Benyamin Davnie (Golkar), incumbent mayor.

- Pilar Saga Ichsan (Demokrat), incumbent vice mayor (as running mate).

- Putri Ayu Anisya (PDI-P), member of the South Tangerang DPRD.
- Marshel Widianto, comedian.

== Political map ==
Following the 2024 Indonesian legislative election, ten political parties are represented in the South Tangerang DPRD:

Political parties	Seat count
Party of Functional Groups (Golkar)	11 / 50
Prosperous Justice Party (PKS)	9 / 50
Indonesian Democratic Party of Struggle (PDI-P)	7 / 50
Great Indonesia Movement Party (Gerindra)	6 / 50
National Awakening Party (PKB)	5 / 50
Democratic Party (Demokrat)	4 / 50
Indonesian Solidarity Party (PSI)	4 / 50
National Mandate Party (PAN)	2 / 50
NasDem Party	1 / 50
United Development Party (PPP)	1 / 50

== Results ==
Candidate	Running mate	Party	Votes	%
Benyamin Davnie	Pilar Saga Ichsan	Golkar	354,027	62.46
Ruhamaben	Shinta Wahyuni	Prosperous Justice Party	212,740	37.54
Total			566,767	100.00
Valid votes			566,767	93.87
Invalid/blank votes			37,006	6.13
Total votes			603,773	100.00
Registered voters/turnout			1,058,127	57.06
Source: CNN Indonesia
