= Sinarmas World Academy =

Private school in Indonesia

Location
- Jl. TM Pahlawan Seribu CBD Lot XV, BSD City. Tangerang; Indonesia, 15322

Information
- School type: Private International School (SPK School)
- Motto: Embracing the Future. Embracing Asia
- Established: 2008
- Grades: Early Years through Grade 12
- Enrollment: 350+ students
- Mascot: Mighty Macan

Sinarmas World Academy (SWA) is a private school in South Tangerang. SWA opened its first classes from Pre-K to Grade 7 in July 2008. Grade 9 and Grade 10 were added in 2009 and Grade 11 with the start of the IB Diploma Programme in August 2010. English is the language of instruction, and all students study Bahasa Indonesia and Mandarin. SWA offers a Chinese programme in partnership with the Peking University Kindergarten, Elementary School, and High School, Beijing, China.

SWA is a Cambridge and IB World School, authorized to offer the Cambridge Primary Curriculum, Cambridge IGCSE Programme, IB Middle Years Programme, and IB Diploma Programme.

The school incorporates the Cambridge Primary Curriculum for Kindergarten Two (K2) to Grade 5 students (5 – 11 years old), to prepare them for the IB Middle Years Programme (MYP), IGCSE and IB Diploma Programme (DP) in SWA.

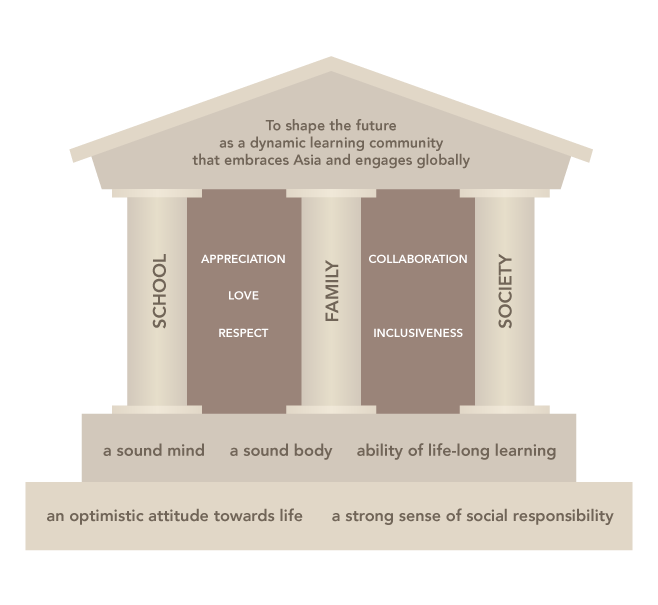
SWA Values

In Grades 6 to 10, the syllabus from Cambridge International Examinations (CIE) is integrated within the International Baccalaureate Middle Years Programme (MYP) curriculum framework. The school shapes the curriculum according to national requirements and to the school’s Asian cultural identity. Teachers assess student learning internally using standards set by IB and CIE with students prepared to take CIE checkpoint exams at the end of Grade 8. Similarly, Grade 10 students have the opportunity to take the IGCSE exams that are assessed by CIE.

In Grades 11 & 12, students follow the International Baccalaureate Diploma Programme, where the curriculum and assessment procedures are prescribed in detail in order to meet the requirements for university entrance around the world. The DP is a comprehensive two-year curriculum.

== Facilities ==
Sinarmas World Academy facilities have been designed to fit 1200 students. Facilities include gymnasiums; sport fields; fitness centre; pools; adventure playground; studios for art, music and dance; science laboratories, theatre, libraries, IT Help Desk, student shop and cafes.

Designed by Fielding Nair International, Sinarmas World Academy's campus was awarded the Project of Distinction Award by the Council of Educational Facilities Planners International in 2009.

== Achievements ==
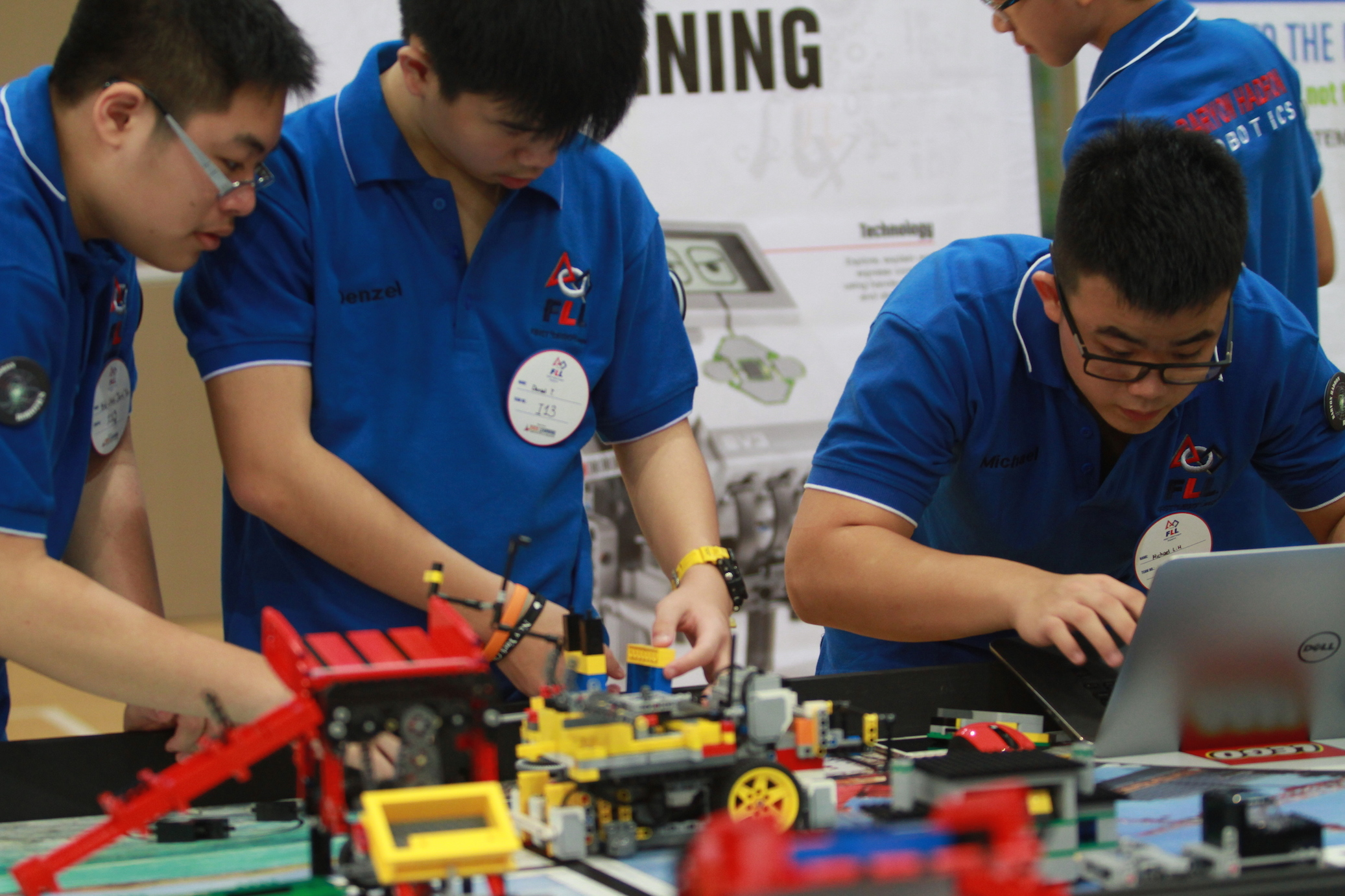
SWA Robotics Team - FLL Singapore March 2016

Sinarmas World Academy students achievements include:

- 4 Gold Awards in Science from Gakken Mathematics and Science Competition February 2016
- 2 Gold Medals, 2 Silver Medals, and 4 Bronze Medals from The International Biomedical Quiz hosted by Anglo-Chinese Junior College, Singapore March 2016
- 5 Gold Medals from FIRST LEGO League, Singapore March 2016
- Bronze Medal in Fencing Competition at St. John's Youth Nation Cup 2015
- 1st place in Jakarta Regional Round Chess Competition Boys U7 Junior Category August 2015
- Christy Zakarias: first Indonesian to receive the prestigious International Diana Memorial Award 2013
- 1 School Top Scholar Award in World Scholars Cup Jakarta Round 2018
- 1st place in World Robotics Olympiad Turkey 2024.

== Extra Curricular / Community Service Programmes ==
Sinarmas World Academy offers a full-year activities programme with options including sports, performing arts and academic offerings. Popular programmes include:

- Global Issues Network
- International Award for Young People
- Model United Nations
- Habitat for Humanity
- World Scholars Cup

Sports include junior and senior varsity football, basketball, swimming, and wushu. Others include inter-school competitions, artistic and cultural activities as well as student initiated IB CAS projects. Sinarmas World Academy's students also participate in an annual Week Without Walls experiential education and service learning trips that provides the opportunity for students to learn and work beyond the school campus.
