= Setu, South Tangerang =

Setu
- Town and District
- Interactive map of Setu
- Country: Indonesia
- Province: Banten
- City: South Tangerang

Area
  - Total: 16.76 km^{2} (6.47 sq mi)

Population (mid 2023 estimate)
  - Total: 91,513
  - Density: 5,460/km^{2} (14,140/sq mi)

Setu is a town and an administrative district (kecamatan) within the city of South Tangerang, in Banten Province on Java, Indonesia (not to be confused with the district of the same name in Bekasi Regency). The district covers an area of 16.76 km^{2} and had a population of 66,225 at the 2010 Census and 84,178 at the 2020 Census; the official estimate as of mid-2023 was 91,513.

== History ==
Setu was previously part of Cisauk district before it was split off from the eastern part of the district in 2007.

== Communities ==
Setu District is sub-divided into six urban communities (kelurahan), listed below with their areas and their officially-estimated populations as of mid-2022, together with their postcodes.

Kode Wilayah	Name of kelurahan	Area in km^{2}	Population mid 2022 estimate	Post code
36.74.07.1001	Muncul	3.61	11,138	15314
36.74.07.1002	Setu (town)	3.64	14,831	15314
36.74.07.1003	Kranggan	1.70	8,526	15312
36.74.07.1004	Kademangan	2.06	23,972	15313
36.74.07.1005	Babakan	2.05	12,439	15315
36.74.07.1006	Bakti Jaya	1.74	19,301	15315
36.74.07	Totals	14.80	90,207 ^{(a)}	

Notes: (a) comprising 45,402 males and 44,805 females.
