= Louise Elisabeth Coldenhoff =

Indonesian seawoman (1935–2021)

Dra. Louise Elisabeth Coldenhoff
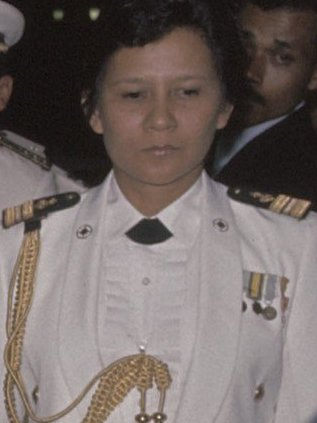
- Born: 22 March 1935
- Died: 7 February 2021 (aged 85); Mintohardjo Naval Hospital, Jakarta, Indonesia
- Burial place: Taman Bahagia Cemetery, Ciledug, South Tangerang
- Military career
- Branch: Indonesian Navy
- Service years: 1963–1990
- Rank: Colonel
- Service number: 2046/P
- Unit: Navy Women's Corps

Louise Elisabeth Coldenhoff (22 March 1935 – 7 February 2021) was an Indonesian naval officer. She was one of the first twelve members of the Navy Women's Corps. She later served one term as head of the Jakarta Regional Office of the Ministry of Education and Culture under Governor Soeprapto from 1983 to 1987.

== Early life ==
Coldenhoff was born on 22 March 1935. She studied at the Padjadjaran University and graduated with a degree in physical education. Coldenhoff was a Catholic.

== Navy Women's Corps ==
=== Enlistment and deployment to West Irian ===
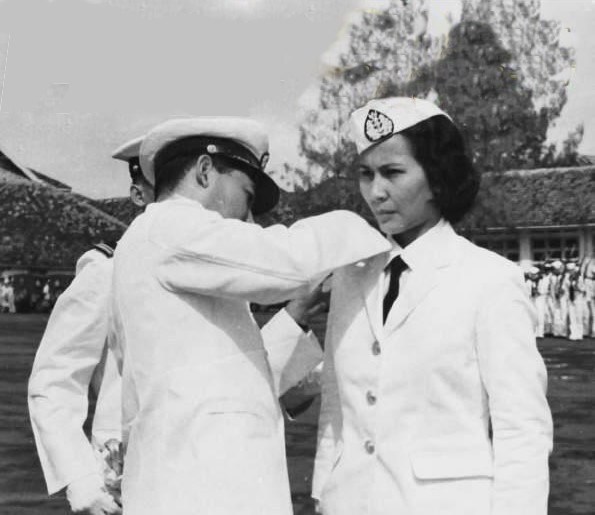
Inauguration of Louise Elisabeth Coldenhoff as a member of the Navy Women's Corps

Following her graduation from the university, Coldenhoff saw that the navy had opened registration for the formation of the Navy Women's Corps. Coldenhoff then enrolled as a conscript.

The selection process was conducted in Malang. Coldenhoff successfully passed all stages of the selection test. She and 11 other members were inaugurated as the first Navy Women's Corps officers on 5 January 1963 by the Chief of Staff of the Navy, Admiral R.E. Martadinata. Coldenhoff was assigned to the Surabaya Navy Supply School. Shortly thereafter, she and other Corps officers were deployed to West Irian. They were airlifted to West Irian, where their plane landed in Merauke. Coldenhoff underwent standing and marching practice and was airlifted again to Hollandia (now Jayapura) after the commencement of the training. She received an order to hoist the flag of Indonesia following the handover of the authority of West Irian from UNTEA to Indonesia. Coldenhoff was appointed as a reserve, while Lieutenant An Go Lian Lie was appointed as the main hoister for the flag. Prior to the flag-hoisting ceremony, Coldenhoff and her colleagues were also tasked with cleaning the ceremony field of bottle shrapnel.

At 00:00 on 1 May 1963, Coldenhoff was informed by a colonel from the army that she should meet Sukarno immediately. She was ordered by Sukarno to replace Lie as the main hoister for the flag.

=== Study and later career ===
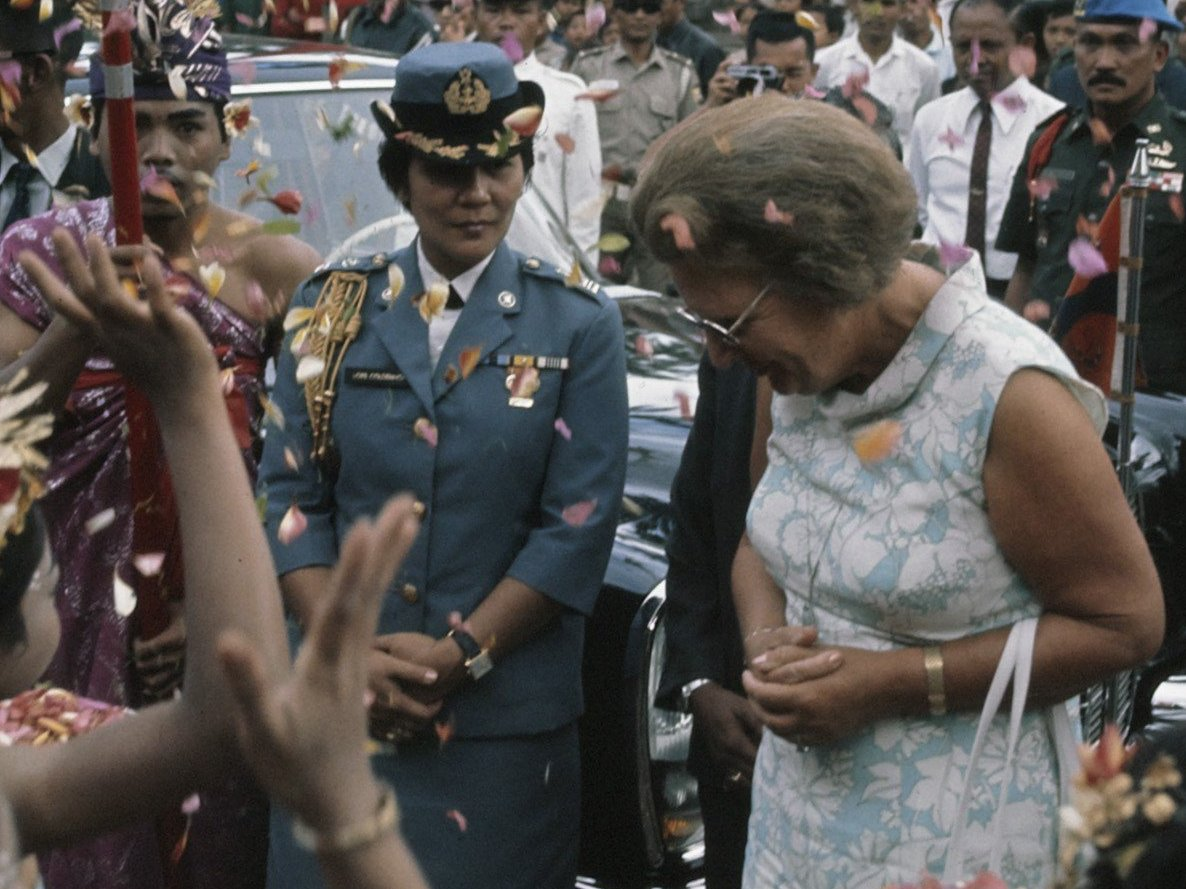
Coldenhoff (middle) with Queen Juliana

Following her deployment, Coldenhoff and her colleagues were sent to the United States to study at the WAVES. Together with her studies at the reserve, she took English and management courses. After finishing her studies, she returned to Indonesia, where she was appointed as the first commander of the Education Center of the Navy Women's Corps.

During the state visit of Queen Juliana to Indonesia in 1971, Coldenhoff was appointed as the adjutant to the Queen.

== Department of Transportation ==
On 27 November 1972, Coldenhoff was appointed head of the personnel section of the Directorate General of Sea Transport. Her main task dealt with the transfer of employees in the directorate. She described her job as "living between angels and devils".

== Regional Office of the Ministry of Education and Culture ==
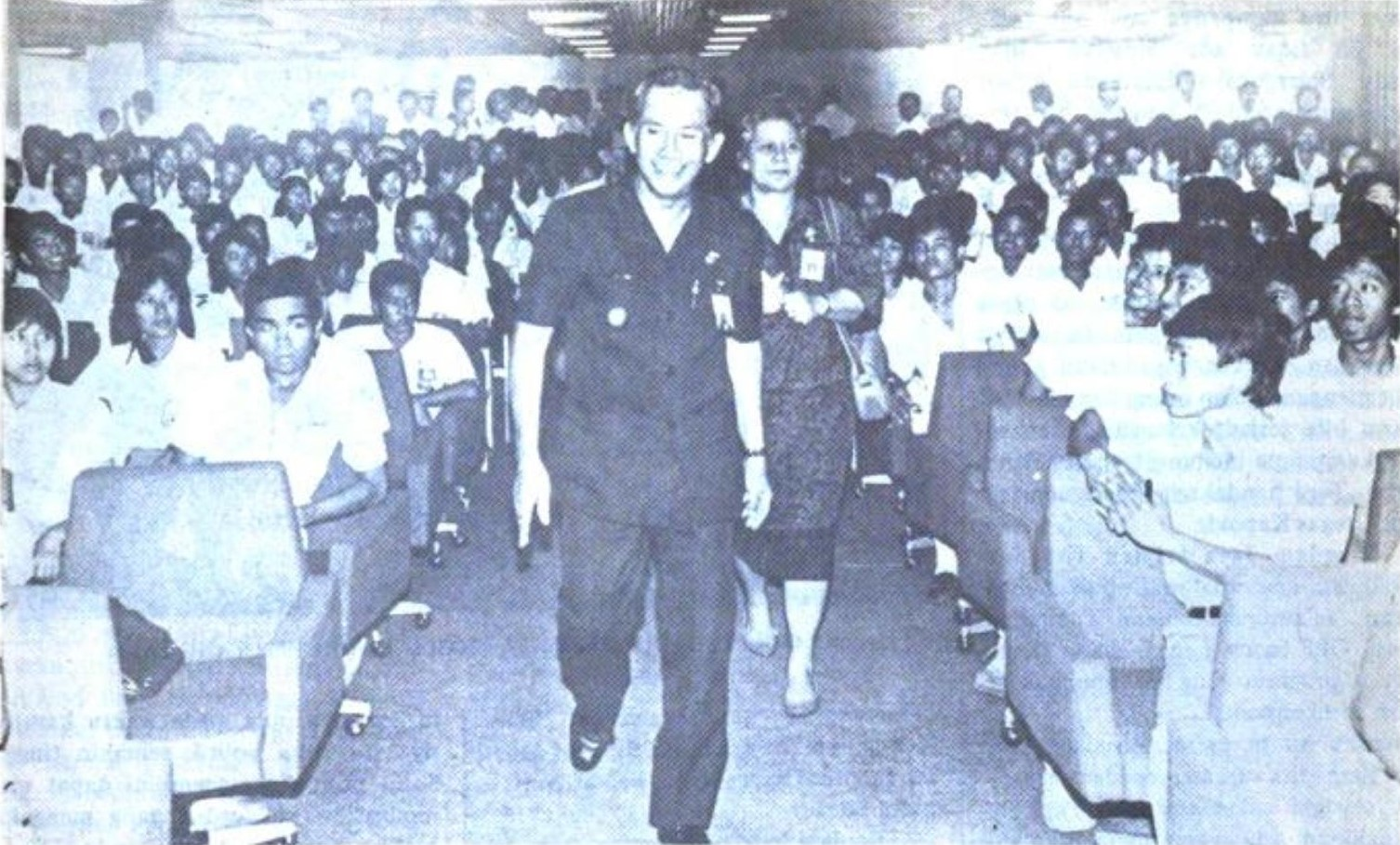
Governor Soeprapto (front) with Coldenhoff (rear)

Coldenhoff was inaugurated as the head of the Jakarta Regional Office of the Ministry of Education and Culture by Governor Soeprapto on 5 February 1983, replacing Colonel Soesdaryono. During her term, she implemented a new local curriculum for students in Jakarta. She gave the autonomy for schools to implement their own subjects in the local curriculum. Following the enactment of this policy, coastal schools in Jakarta added fishing to the local curriculum.

Her term ended on 10 July 1987, when she was replaced by Soegiyo.

== Later life and death ==
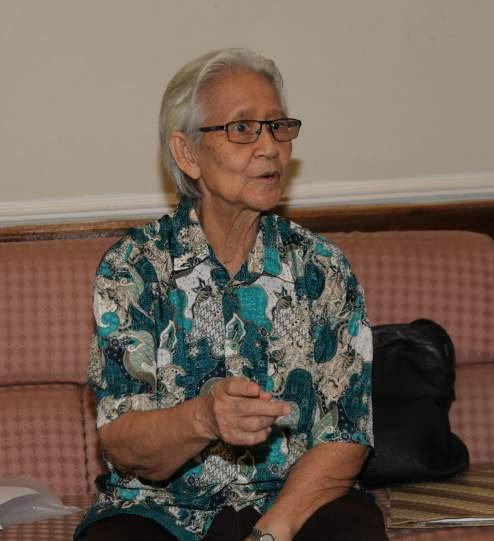
Coldenhoff in 2017

Coldenhoff retired from the Navy with the rank of colonel. Coldenhoff later became the Chairman of the MPK (Catholic Education Council) of the Jakarta branch.

Coldenhoff died at 15.45 on 7 February 2021 in Mintohardjo Naval Hospital, Bendungan Hilir, Central Jakarta. She was buried at the Taman Bahagia Cemetery, a public cemetery in Ciledug, South Tangerang.
