= Situ Gintung =

Indonesian artificial lake in South Tangerang

- Lake Gintung
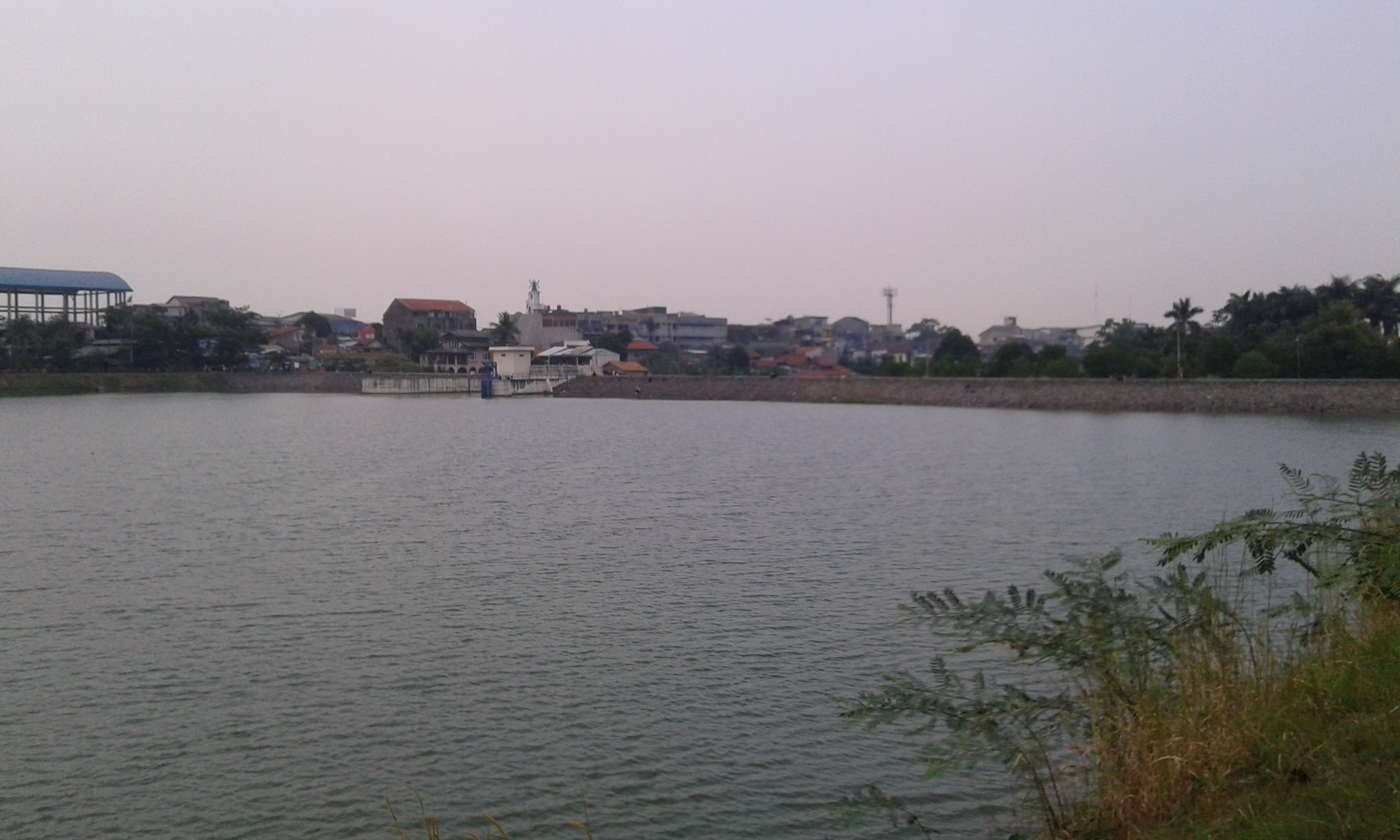
- Situ Gintung, 2014

- Location within Indonesia
- Location: South Tangerang, Indonesia
- Coordinates: 06°18′18″S 106°45′45″E
- Type: Artificial lake

Situ Gintung (Sundanese, Lake Gintung) is an artificial lake near to the town of Cirendeu (pronounced [tʃirəndɤ]) in the city of South Tangerang, Indonesia. It was formed by a dam up to 16 m (52 ft) high which was built by Dutch colonial authorities in 1933. The dam failed on 27 March 2009, draining the lake, with resulting floods killing at least 100 people.

== History ==
The lake and dam are located in the suburb of Cirendeu, Ciputat in South Tangerang. The dam was originally built of earth by Dutch colonial authorities in 1933 and was up to 16 m (52 ft) high. It was made from earth compacted into a wall 16 m (52 ft) high and the reservoir held at least 2,000,000 m^{3} (71,000,000 cu ft) of water. The original use of the dam had been to retain water for irrigation of rice paddies which were then replaced by urban development. People living near the dam had made complaints about leaks in the past and the dam actually breached in November 2008 but no damage was done. It is thought that little maintenance had been carried out since the dam was built.

== 2009 flood ==
2009 Situ Gintung flood
Meteorological history
- Duration: 27 March 2009

Overall effects
- Fatalities: At least 100
- Areas affected: Cirendeu, Indonesia

The area experienced several hours of heavy rain on the night of 26–27 March 2009 which caused the dam level to rise, apparently because the gate leading to the spillway was too small. The dam was overtopped, eroding the dam surface and resulting in a breach 70 m (230 ft) wide at around 2 am on 27 March local time (7 pm 26 March GMT). Cracks were reportedly visible in the face of the dam embankment from around midnight. The dam operators apparently sounded a warning siren shortly before the dam failed. A surge of water and debris several metres high was sent into the town of Cirendeu, washing away cars, houses and a brick-built bridge. The flood hit while most of the population was asleep and left standing water up to 2.5 m (8.2 ft) deep. Many people were trapped in the town, many townspeople took to their rooftops to avoid the floodwaters. The flood killed 98 people, and 5 more were unaccounted for. The waters also inundated around 400 homes of which 250 were damaged or destroyed, displacing 171 people. The flood submerged five power terminals cutting drinking water supplies to the nearby suburb of Lebak Bulus.

The government of Indonesia evacuated people to higher ground at a nearby university campus. Troops of the Indonesian Army were brought in to rescue survivors and to move bodies to a nearby makeshift morgue. The site of the disaster was visited by President Susilo Bambang Yudhoyono, Vice-President Yusuf Kalla and Welfare Minister Aburizal Bakrie; and the government stated that it would pay for repairs to houses damaged by the flood. Emergency repairs to the dam structure were carried out and the government began inspections of similar dam structures. President Yudhoyono promised that the cause of the disaster would be investigated, and any dam staff found to have been negligent in their duties would face court charges. Six officials have since been cited for negligence by the Indonesian Forum for the Environment.

According to the BBC the area has "an ageing, poorly maintained drainage system which struggles to cope with heavy rainfall". Floods in 2007 in the nearby capital Jakarta killed more than 50 people. Yudhoyono vowed to rebuild the dam "in a proper way so that it will not cause any further public concern".

== See also ==
- List of drainage basins of Indonesia
