= Cirendeu =

Urban community in Tangerang Selatan City, Indonesia

Coordinates: 6°18′25″S 106°46′1″E

Cirendeu, also spelled Cireundeu, is a suburb of the town of Ciputat. It is located in the city of South Tangerang, Banten Province in Indonesia. The suburb was home to the Situ Gintung, an artificial lake and dam which was breached on 27 March 2009, causing the deaths of at least 99 people.
