= Stephanie Poetri =

Indonesian singer-songwriter (born 2000)

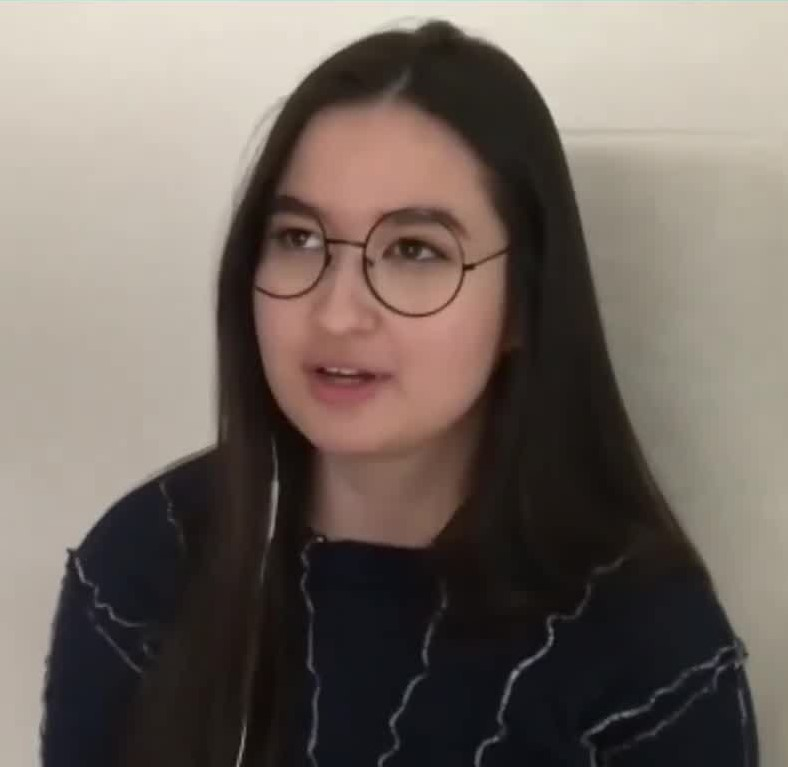
- Poetri in 2021
- Born: Stephanie Poetri Dougharty; 20 May 2000 (age 26); Jakarta, Indonesia
- Education: Global Jaya School
- Occupations: Singer; songwriter; record producer
- Spouse: Asher Novkov-Bloom (m. 2026)
- Parents: Andrew Dougharty (father); Titi DJ (mother)
- Musical career
- Genre: Pop
- Instrument: Vocals
- Label: 88rising

Stephanie Poetri Dougharty (born 20 May 2000) is an Indonesian singer-songwriter and record producer. She signed with record label 88rising in August 2019.

== Early life ==
Stephanie Poetri Dougharty was born on 20 May 2000 in Jakarta, Indonesia, to an Indonesian mother, Titi DJ, and an American father, Andrew Dougharty, who was the Head of School of the school she attended, Global Jaya International School. She was raised in Jakarta and grew up with two half-sisters and a half-brother from her mother's side.

== Career ==
=== 2015–2019 ===
Poetri's first major work came in 2015, when she, along with Goodbye Felicia, performed a cover of "Bimbang" for the Indonesian teen film Ada Apa Dengan Cinta? 2.

In 2019, Poetri released her debut single titled "Appreciate", in both Indonesian and English.

=== 2019–2021 ===
Poetri's breakthrough as an artist came with the release of her single, "I Love You 3000", on 3 June 2019. The inspiration from the song came from an Instagram Q&A with her followers, along with the release of Avengers: Endgame (Note: Avengers: Endgame features a viral line where Tony Stark's (Iron Man) daughter, Morgan, tells him "I love you 3000.") a week before the Q&A. The song was streamed over 425 million, topping Spotify’s Global Viral 50 for over four weeks. The song won her Best New Asian Artist - Indonesia at the 2019 Mnet Asian Music Awards. A remix of the song, titled "I Love You 3000 II", featured Got7 member Jackson Wang. It was released on 88rising's Head in the Clouds II album, and topped the Billboard social charts in China. The pair also collaborated on a music video, that received over 14 million views on YouTube.

In February 2020, Poetri released two new singles, titled "Do You Love Me" and "Touch". Poetri has described the songs as "anti-romance" songs, and said "In my opinion, [the songs] have a little bit more depth and they're less storyline-based, but still very much a kind of story that some people can relate to."

In April 2020, Poetri released the single titled "Straight To You." Speaking on the music video, Poetri stated, "I decided to do a fun project where I used a green screen to make a video at home since we couldn't really shoot a full-on production during this time. I got very into it and made a full music video all by myself in my room and edited it really intensely over 48 hours!"

=== 2021–present ===
In December 2020, Poetri released her single "Selfish". It was her first and only single to be released from the debut EP AM:PM, which was released on 12 March 2021. Following AM:PM, Poetri released her second EP, oh to be in love, on March 18, 2022.

== Personal life ==
Poetri moved to Los Angeles, California, in November 2019 to pursue her music career. However, as a result of the COVID-19 pandemic, she moved back to Jakarta to be with her family.

Poetri has cited Alec Benjamin, Finneas O'Connell, Jeremy Zucker, and fellow 88rising artist Niki as musical inspirations. She also enjoys K-pop, citing Blackpink, Got7, and Twice as some of her favorite groups.

== Discography ==
=== Extended plays ===
Title	Album details
AM:PM	Released: 12 March 2021; Label: Infinite Thrills, 88rising, 12Tone Music; Formats: Digital download, streaming

=== Singles ===
Single	Year	Album
"Bimbang"	2015	Ada Apa Dengan Cinta? 2
"Appreciate"	2019	Non-album singles
"Appreciate (English version)"	2019	Non-album singles
"I Love You 3000"	2019	Non-album singles
"I Love You 3000 II"	2019	Head in the Clouds II
"Do You Love Me"	2020	Non-album singles
"Touch"	2020	Non-album singles
"Straight to You"	2020	Non-album singles
"Selfish"	2021	AM:PM
"How We Used To"	2021	AM:PM
"IRL"	2021	AM:PM
"Daydreaming"	2021	AM:PM
"3PM"	2021	AM:PM
"Paranoia"	2021	AM:PM
"Bad Haircut" (feat. Jvke)	2022	oh to be in love
"Honeymoon"	2022	oh to be in love
"Picture Myself"	2022	oh to be in love
"Please Don't Die Before I Do"	2022	oh to be in love
"Little Lifetimes"	2022	oh to be in love
"Breakfast in Bed" (with Gnash)	2022	Non-album singles
"No Explanations" (with Elephante and Zhang Yanqi)	2023	Non-album singles
"Astrologically Illogical"	2023	Non-album singles

== Awards and nominations ==
Year	Ceremony	Category	Result	Ref.
2019	Mnet Asian Music Awards	Best New Asian Artist - Indonesia	Won	
2020	iHeartRadio Music Awards	Social Star Award	Nominated	
