= German School Jakarta =

- German: Deutsche Schule Jakarta; Indonesian: Sekolah Jerman Jakarta
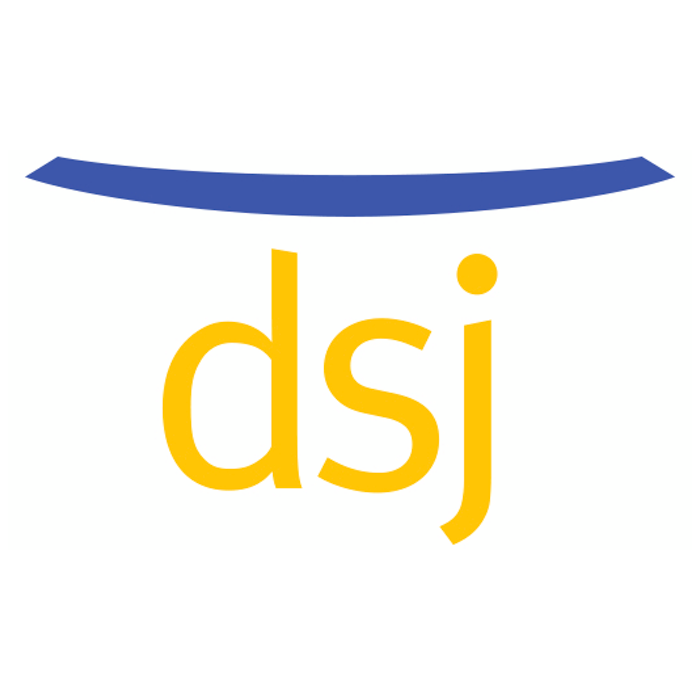

Location
- Jl. Puspa Widya No 8 BSD City, Serpong; South Tangerang, Banten, 15322; Indonesia
- Coordinates: 6.2866°S 106.6675°E

Information
- Type: German International School
- Founded: 1956
- Principal: Dr. Jörg Dietze
- Grades: Preschool, Primary School (1-6), Secondary School (7-12)
- Language: German, English, Indonesian
- Classrooms: 50
- Campus size: 4.2 ha
- Campus type: Urban
Colors
Blue and Gold
- Website: germanschooljakarta.id

The German School Jakarta (German: Deutsche Schule Jakarta), often informally referred to as DSJ, is a German international school in the BSD community of South Tangerang in Greater Jakarta, Indonesia. It offers comprehensive education from preschool to secondary school.

The school was formerly known as the German International School Jakarta (German: Deutsche Internationale Schule Jakarta, informally DIS Jakarta), and moved into its newly built campus in BSD in 1998.

== History ==
=== Founding in Bandung ===
The German School was founded in 1956 by a group of German doctors that were stationed across Indonesia as part of their work for the World Health Organization. Due to the challenges of the tropical weather, they decided to send their children to the more temperate city of Bandung, where the German School started as a learning group of volunteer teachers and officially opened the year after.

=== Relocation to Jakarta ===
In 1967 the school moved to Jakarta due to the city's growing importance in the region, thus attracting more and more German expats. The school was housed in the former German embassy building in Menteng and changed its name to German International School Jakarta. With the years the school outgrew its location in Menteng and thus decided to build a new campus in Serpong, South Tangerang in 1996, where it finally moved to two years later.

After the millennium the school gradually opened its gates for local students and is recognized as Excellent German School Abroad since 2008 by the German authorities. In 2017 it was rebranded to its current name German School Jakarta in order to comply with the 2014 regulations of the Indonesian authorities that prohibit the use of the word "international" in school names due to some schools having failed to meet standards for international schools.
