= AM PM (EP) =

AM:PM

EP by Stephanie Poetri
- Released: 12 March 2021
- Recorded: 2020
- Genre: Electropop
- Length: 17:37
- Label: Infinite Thrills; 88rising; 12Tone

Singles from AM:PM
- 1. "Selfish" Released: 1 December 2020; 2. "How We Used To" Released: 14 January 2021; 3. "IRL" Released: 11 February 2021

AM PM (stylized as AM:PM) is the debut extended play by Indonesian singer-songwriter Stephanie Poetri. It was released on 12 March 2021 by Infinite Thrills, 88rising, and 12Tone Music.

== Background ==
AM:PM was composed in 2020 in the midst of the COVID-19 pandemic. The title AM:PM refers to the two contrasting themes featured throughout the project: the brightness of day and the darkness of night. In an interview with NME, Poetri stated,

"I had a couple of really early morning and really late-night sessions to line up my schedule with America, and that somehow affected the music I had written. It became very apparent that there were very distinct and different vibes. At first, I was a little confused as to how I would fit all of the songs into one EP and have it flow properly, and then we realised that three songs sounded very morning-like and the other three sounded more suited to the night."

== Release ==
The project's first single, "Selfish", was released on 1 December 2020. The second single, "How We Used To", was released on 14 January 2021. The third single, "IRL", was released on 11 February 2021. All three singles were accompanied with music videos.

Alongside the release of the EP on 12 March 2021, Poetri released a music video for "Paranoia."

== Track listing ==
Credits adapted from Spotify.

No.	Title	Writer(s)	Producer(s)	Length
1.	"Daydreaming"	Hannah Wondmeneh; Stephanie Poetri; Taylor Dexter; Wesley Singerman	Dexter; Singerman	2:50
2.	"IRL"	Wondmeneh; Poetri; Dexter; Singerman	Dexter; Singerman	3:18
3.	"3PM"	Poetri	Petra Sihombing	3:16
4.	"How We Used To"	Mason Sacks; Paul Daniel; Poetri; Will Van Zandth	Daniel; Sacks	2:49
5.	"Selfish"	Annika Wells; Hailey Leane Collier; Mark Williams; Raul Cubina; Poetri	Ojivolta	2:26
6.	"Paranoia"	Everett Romano; Poetri; Dexter; Singerman	Heavy Mellow; Dexter; Singerman	2:56
Total length:				17:37
