= I Love You 3000 =

2019 single by Stephanie Poetri

Single by Stephanie Poetri
- Released: June 3, 2019
- Recorded: 2019
- Genre: Pop
- Length: 3:29
- Label: 88rising; 12Tone Music
- Songwriter: Stephanie Poetri
- Producers: Austin Ong; Stephanie Poetri

Stephanie Poetri singles chronology
"Appreciate" (2019)	"I Love You 3000" (2019)	"I Love You 3000 II" (2019)

Music video
- "I Love You 3000" on YouTube

"I Love You 3000" is a single by Indonesian singer-songwriter Stephanie Poetri. It was released on June 3, 2019, through 88rising and 12Tone Music.

== Background ==
Inspiration for the song came after Poetri held an Instagram Q&A with her followers. Poetri asked her followers to send her a phrase she could turn into a song, and many responded with the phrase "I Love You 3000". This was mainly due to the release of superhero film Avengers: Endgame a week earlier, which featured the viral line. Poetri later came up with a chorus and released a sample on her Instagram story. The sample was met with much fanfare from her followers, leading her to create a full single.

== Reception ==
"I Love You 3000" became a viral hit worldwide and has been credited as Poetri's breakthrough track. Since its release, the track had been streamed over 425 million times across various streaming platforms. It also topped Spotify's Global Viral 50 chart for over 4 weeks, peaking at the #1 spot. The track also led Poetri to her first major award at the 2019 Mnet Asian Music Awards, winning "Best New Asian Artist - Indonesia."

Poetri also released a music video for the song on YouTube. It was shot using her phone camera with the help of her sister in Los Angeles. The video has amassed over 90 million views since its release.

== Sequel ==
A remix of the song, titled "I Love You 3000 II," featured Got7 member Jackson Wang. It was released on 88rising's compilation album, Head in the Clouds II, on October 11, 2019. The song peaked at number one on the Billboard China Social Charts.
