= Benyamin Davnie =

Indonesian politician

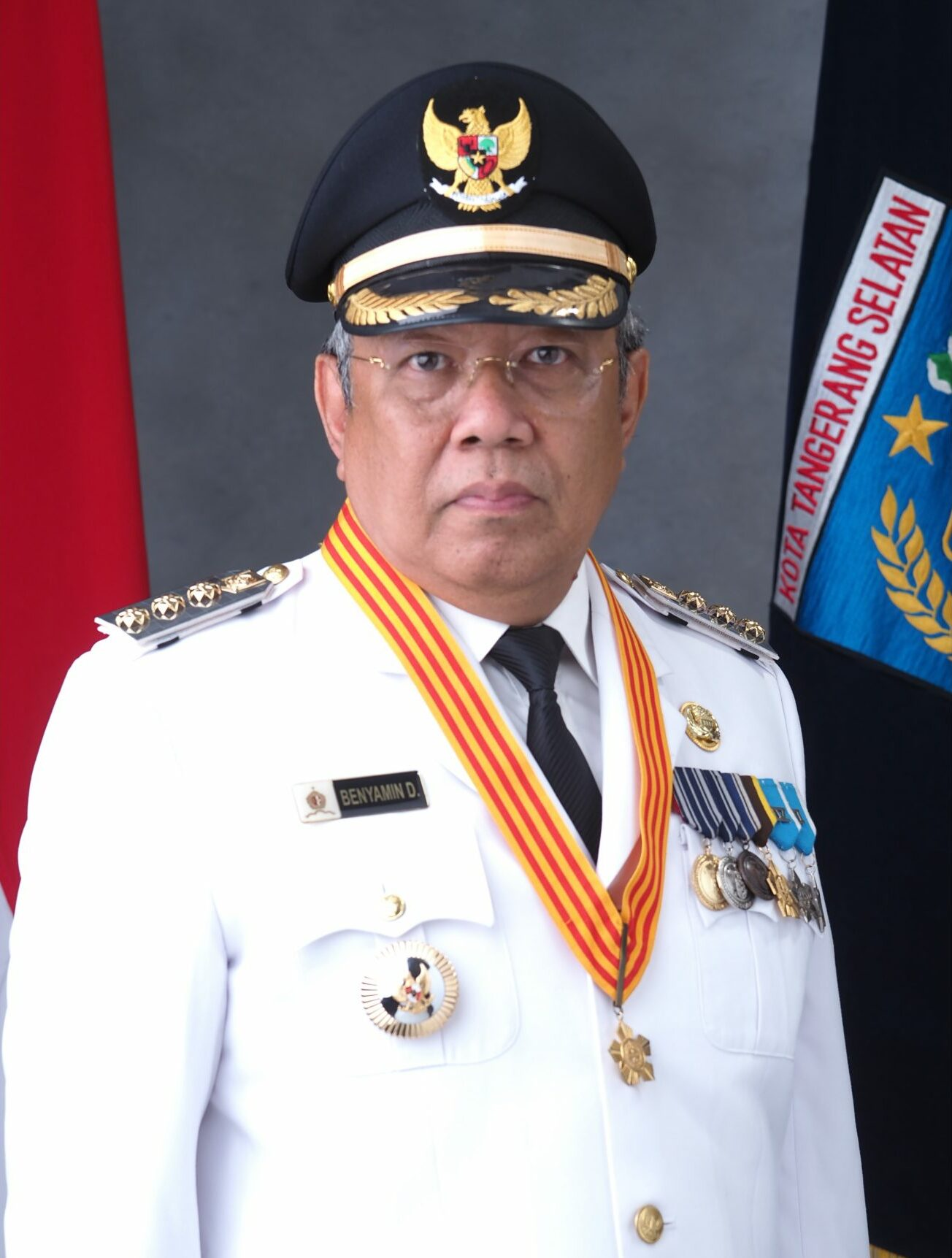
- Official portrait

2nd Mayor of South Tangerang
- Incumbent
- Assumed office 26 April 2021
- Deputy: Pilar Saga Ichsan
- Preceded by: Airin Rachmi Diany

1st Vice Mayor of South Tangerang
- In office 20 April 2011 – 20 April 2011
- Mayor: Airin Rachmi Diany
- Preceded by: Office established
- Succeeded by: Pilar Saga Ichsan

Personal details
- Born: 1 September 1958 (age 68) Pandeglang, West Java, Indonesia
- Party: Gerindra
- Education: Padjadjaran University (Drs.)

Benyamin Davnie (born 1 September 1958) is an Indonesian politician who is the current mayor of South Tangerang, having served since 2021. Before being elected mayor in 2020, he was vice mayor under Airin Rachmi Diany between 2011 and 2021, and was previously a civil servant in the municipal government of Tangerang Regency.

== Early life and education ==
Benyamin Davnie was born in Pandeglang Regency, West Java (today in Banten province), on 1 September 1958. He was the child of Mugni Sastradipura (d. 2000) and Ratnaningsih Mugni (d. 2003). Sastradipura served in the Indonesian Army and reached the rank of colonel. He studied at state-funded schools in Tangerang, before He graduated with a bachelor's degree from Padjadjaran University's faculty of politics and social science.

== Civil service ==
His career as a civil servant began as a volunteer staff, before he was appointed as a full civil servant of Tangerang Regency. He gradually rose through the ranks, becoming the district head at Ciledug, Cisoka, and Tigaraksa throughout the late 1980s and the 1990s. He was also head of public relations for the regency. He also headed a number of departments within the regency's bureaucracy.

== Political career ==
=== Vice Mayor of South Tangerang ===
In 2010, Benyamin ran as the running mate to Airin Rachmi Diany to become the mayor of newly formed South Tangerang. The pair was elected with 46.43% of the votes out of four candidates. The pair was sworn in on 20 April 2011. Airin and Benyamin ran for a second term in 2015, securing 59.62% of the votes. They were sworn in for their second term on 20 April 2016.

=== Mayor of South Tangerang ===
In the 2020 mayoral election, Benyamin ran as a mayoral candidate with the endorsement of Golkar, with Pilar Saga Ichsan (Airin's nephew) as his running mate. The pair won 235,734 votes (40.9%), defeating two other tickets. Benyamin and Pilar were sworn in on 26 April 2021. Prior to the mayoral election, he had been a member of the NasDem Party, but he left the party after he secured Golkar's endorsement in the election while Nasdem did not endorse him.
