= Airin Rachmi Diany =

Indonesian politician

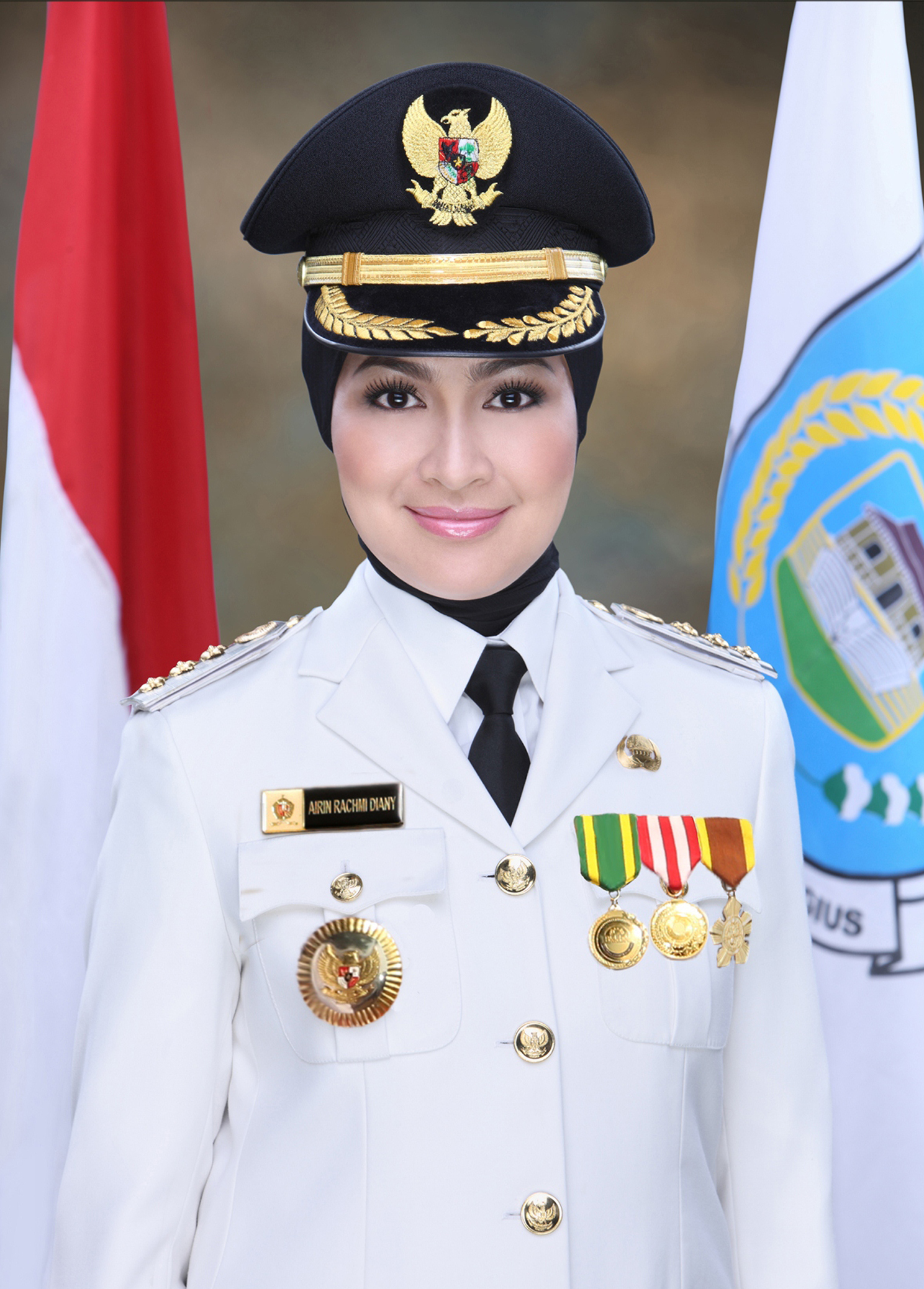

1st Mayor of South Tangerang
- In office 20 April 2011 – 20 April 2021
- Preceded by: Hidayat Djohari (acting)
- Succeeded by: Benyamin Davnie

Personal details
- Born: 28 August 1976 (age 49) Ciamis, Indonesia
- Party: Golkar
- Spouse: Tubagus Chaeri Wardana
- Children: 2
- Education: Parahyangan Catholic University; Padjadjaran University
- Website: airinrachmidiany.com

Airin Rachmi Diany (born 1976) is an Indonesian politician who served as the mayor of South Tangerang from 2011 to 2021. She is also the aunt of Banten lieutenant governor Andika Hazrumy. She has led several initiatives to combat recruitment of people in her city by radical fundamentalist groups, including interfaith forums, with the support of Indonesia's central government. She also commissioned a canal project in order to prevent flooding on the Jakarta–Serpong Toll Road in February 2017.

Diany is a former beauty queen who represented West Java at 1996 Puteri Indonesia, where she was one of ten finalists. In the same competition, she won the People's Choice Award and the Miss Indonesia Tourism award. Actress-turned-representative in the People's Representative Council, Nurul Arifin, pointed to Diany and Surabaya mayor Tri Rismaharini as her inspiration for running for mayor of Bandung.

== Political career ==
Diany started her political career in 2008. In that year, she became a candidate for deputy regent of Tangerang under Tangerang regent candidate Jazuli Juwaeli. They lost to Ismet Iskandar and Rano Karno. When South Tangerang officially became a new expansion area in 2009, Airin ran as a candidate for mayor in the 2010 South Tangerang regional elections, paired with Benyamin Davnie, and obtained a majority, with 241,797 votes. Diany and Benyamin officially became Mayor and Deputy Mayor of South Tangerang in 2011–2016, and were re-elected in the 2016 South Tangerang regional elections, holding these positions until 2021.

Following her tenure in South Tangerang, Diany ran in 2024 as a candidate for the national House of Representatives for Banten's 3rd electoral district as a Golkar candidate, and was elected with 302,878 votes.

Diany ran as a candidate for Governor of Banten, paired with former deputy regent of Lebak Ade Sumardi for Vice Governor, in the 2024 Banten gubernatorial election, but did not in.

== Personal life ==
Diany is married to Tubagus Chaeri Wardana, the younger brother of former Banten Governor Ratu Atut Chosiyah. They married in 1997 and have two children, namely Tubagus Ghifari Al Chusaeri Wardana (1998) and Ratu Ghefira Marhamah Wardana (2004).
