= South Tangerang =

City in Banten, Indonesia

South Tangerang Tangerang Selatan
- City
- City of South Tangerang; Kota Tangerang Selatan

Other transcription(s)
  - Betawi: Tangerang Belah Udik
  - Sundanese: ᮓᮚᮩᮂ ᮒᮍᮨᮛᮀ ᮊᮤᮓᮥᮜ᮪
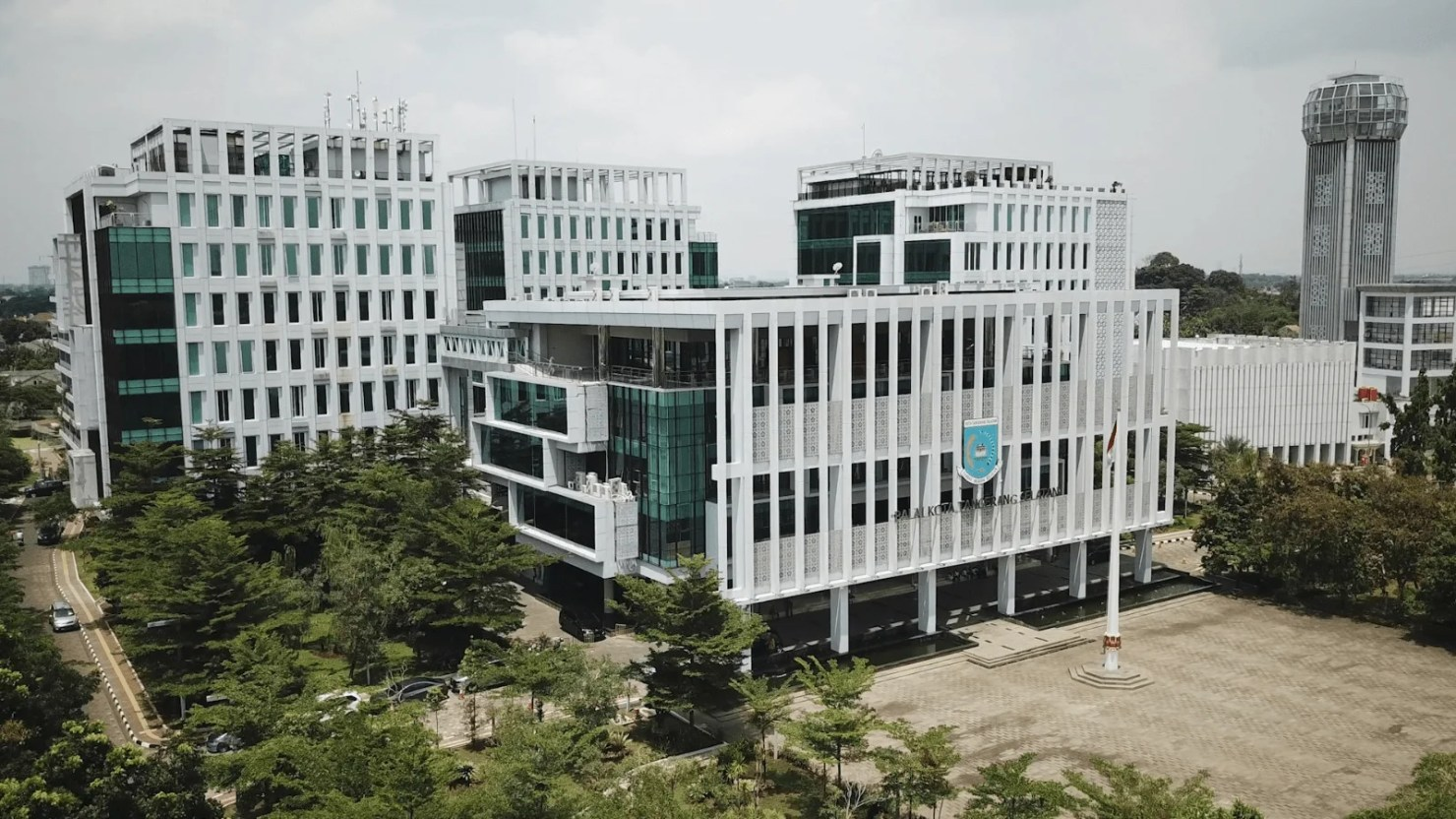
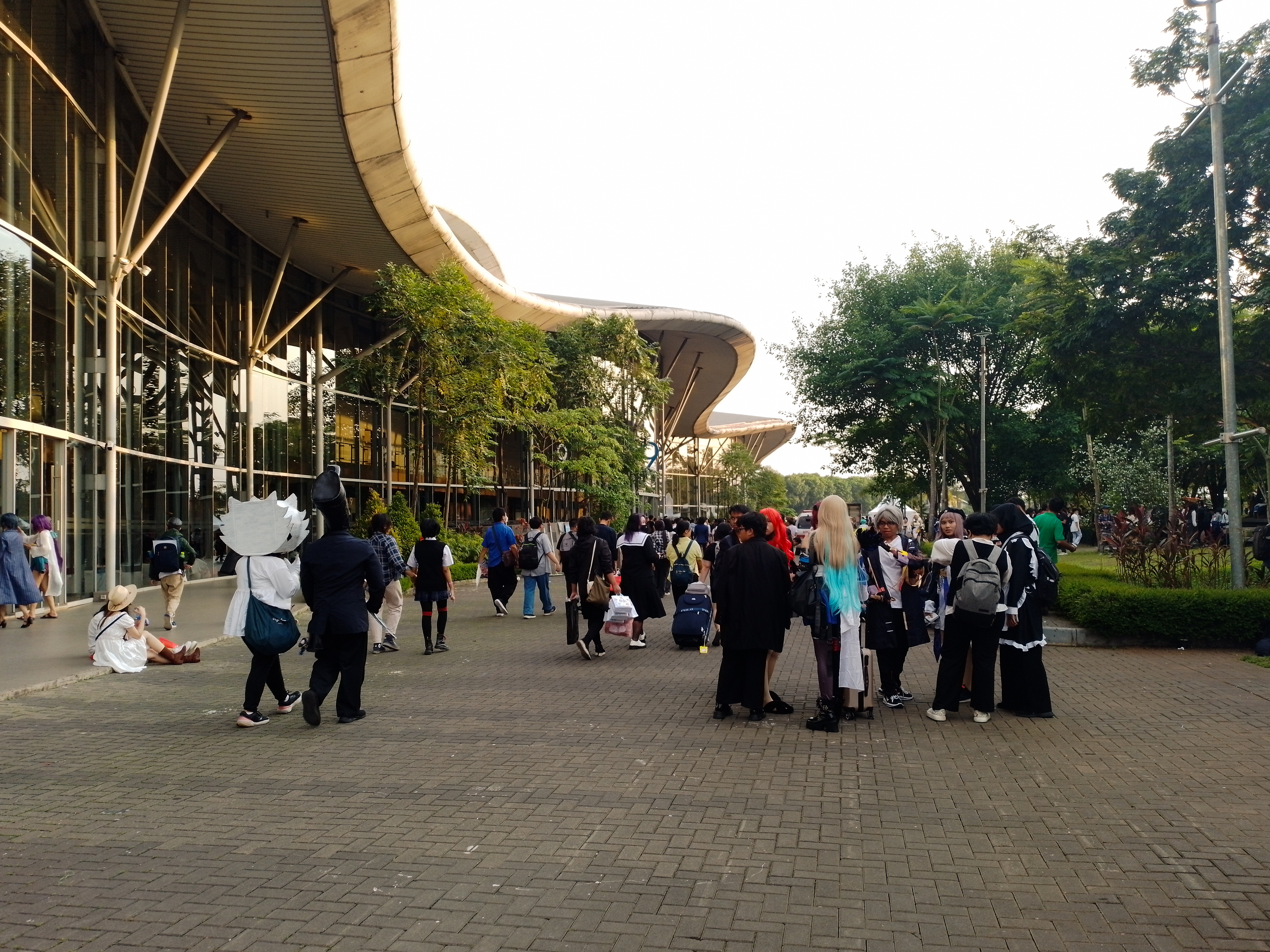
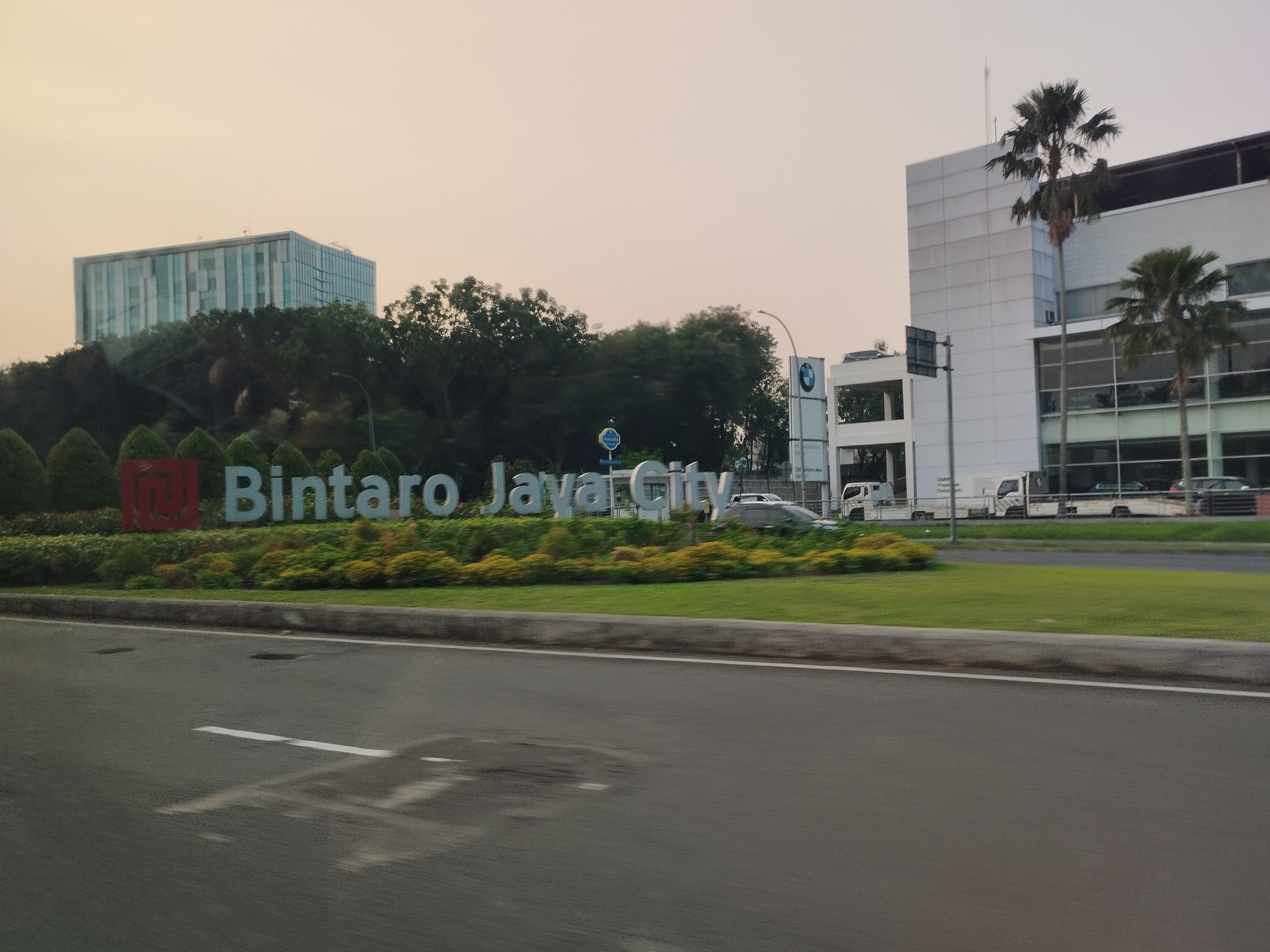
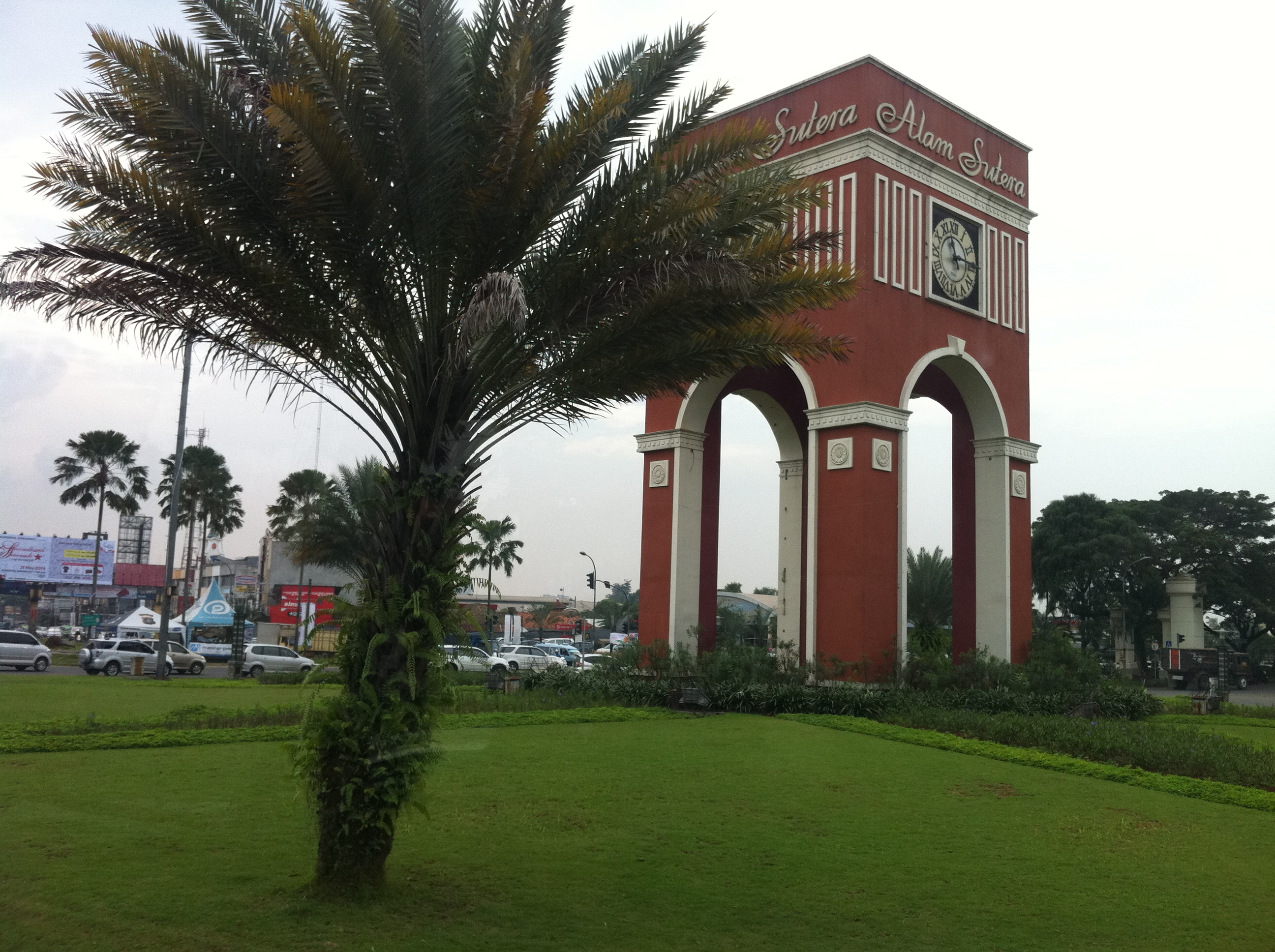
- From clockwise top: South Tangerang Town Hall, Indonesia Convention Exhibition, Bintaro Jaya avenue, and Alam Sutera

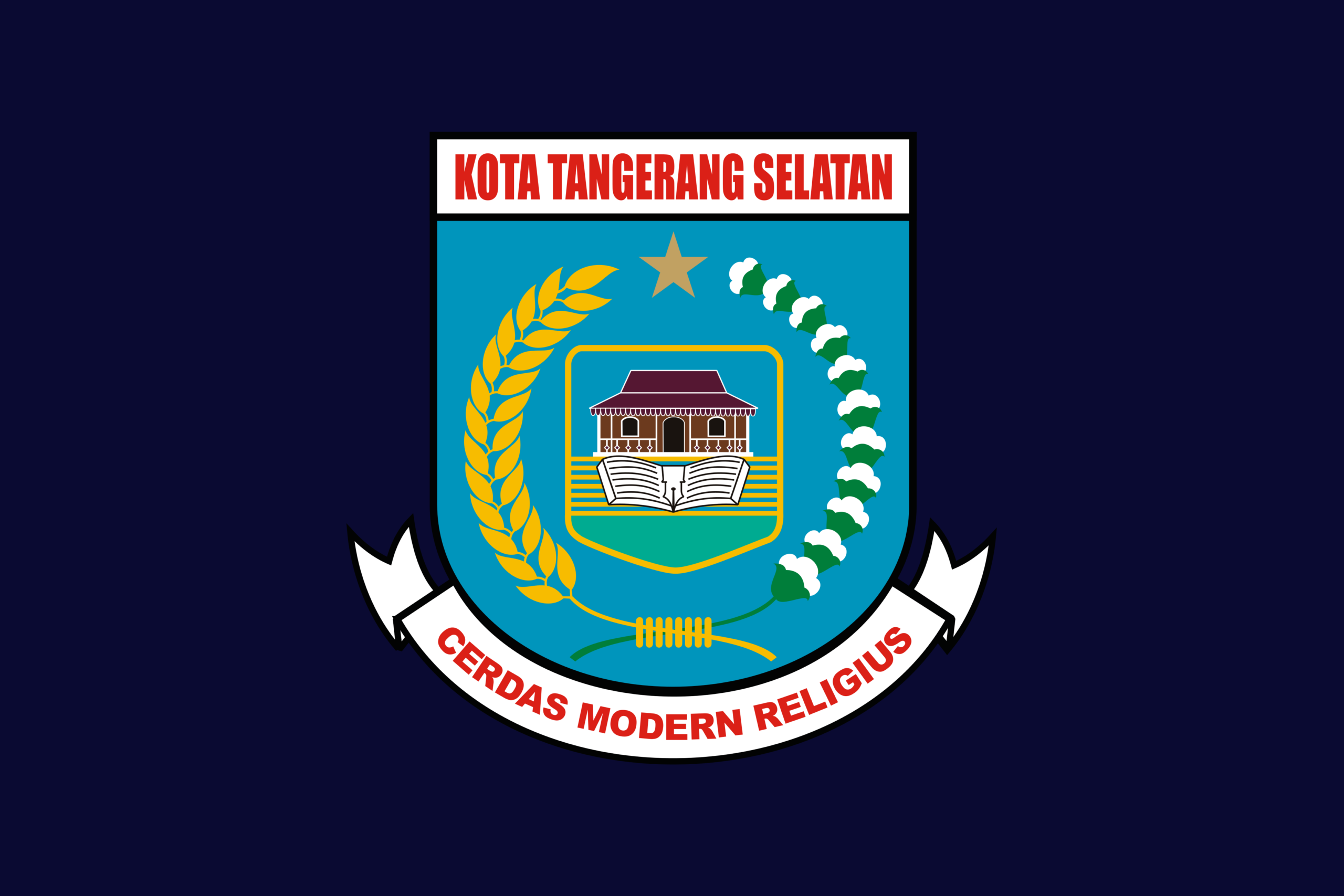
- Flag Coat of arms
- Motto: Cerdas, Modern, Religius (Intelligent, Modern, Religious)
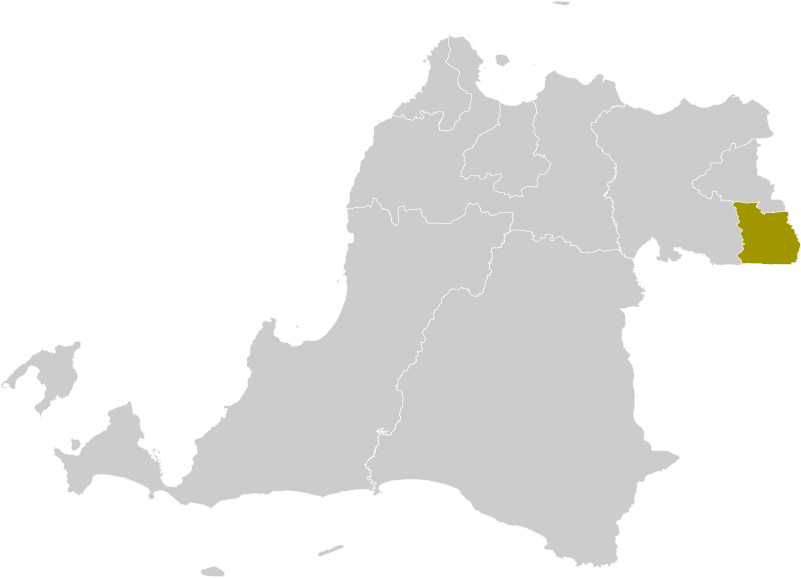
- Location within Banten

- Location in Java and Indonesia South Tangerang (Indonesia)
- Coordinates: 6°17′20″S 106°43′05″E
- Country: Indonesia
- Province: Banten
- Metropolitan area: Jabodetabek
- Established: 26 November 2008

Government
  - Body: South Tangerang City government
  - Mayor: Benyamin Davnie (Gerindra)
  - Vice Mayor: Pilar Saga Ichsan

Area
  - Total: 164.86 km^{2} (63.65 sq mi)
- Elevation: 45.83 m (150.4 ft)

Population (mid 2024 estimate)
  - Total: 1,429,529
  - Density: 8,671.2/km^{2} (22,458/sq mi)
- Time zone: UTC+7 (Indonesia Western Time)
- Postcodes: 15xxx
- Area code: (+62) 21
- Vehicle registration: B xxxx Nxx/Wxx
- HDI (2022): ▲0.820 (Very High)
- Website: tangerangselatankota.go.id

South Tangerang (Indonesian: Tangerang Selatan, Sundanese: ᮓᮚᮩᮂ ᮒᮍᮨᮛᮀ ᮊᮤᮓᮥᮜ᮪, romanized: Dayeuh Tangerang Kidul) abbreviated as Tangsel, is a city in the province of Banten, Indonesia. Located 30 km (19 mi) on the southwestern border of Jakarta, the city forms part of the Greater Jakarta metropolitan area. It was administratively separated from Tangerang Regency on 26 November 2008. According to the 2020 Census, the city population was 1,354,350 inhabitants, while the official estimate as of mid-2024 was 1,429,629 - comprising 712,409 males and 717,120 females. The total area is 164.86 km^{2} (63.65 sq mi). It is the second-largest city in Banten (after Tangerang immediately to its north) in terms of population, and has grown rapidly, not only as Jakarta's satellite city, but also as the development of business districts and commerce due to presence of large-scale planned town by private developers.

South Tangerang is home to some planned towns built by private developers, the notable ones are Alam Sutera (in North Serpong), BSD City (in Serpong and Setu), and Bintaro Jaya (in Pondok Aren and Ciputat), complete with facilities such as business centers, hospitals, shopping malls, and international schools such as British School Jakarta, Global Jaya School, German School Jakarta (Deutsche Schule Jakarta), and a Monash University campus in BSD, among other prominent private universities. In the same city, there is another major mixed‑use development called SouthCity, a 57‑hectare superblock in the Pondok Cabe area that includes residential neighbourhoods, commercial spaces, and planned lifestyle facilities, as well as a joint investment of over Rp 1 trillion to build a regional shopping mall within the superblock, reflecting its role in South Tangerang's evolving urban landscape. Currently, the average land price in South Tangerang is the most expensive among Jakarta's satellite cities.

== History ==
The municipality of South Tangerang is an autonomous city established on 26 November 2008, based on Banten province's constitution. This establishment was a division out of the Tangerang Regency, to support the better development of government service, construction project, community service, and also to utilize the natural potential so that a greater public welfare could be achieved.

=== Situ Gintung flood ===
Situ Gintung reservoir was built by the Dutch colonial authorities in 1933. It is located at the kelurahan of Cirendeu in East Ciputat District. It was surrounded by a dam up to 16 metres (52 ft) high, which failed on 27 March 2009 with the resulting floods killing at least 93 people.

== Demographics ==
=== Languages ===
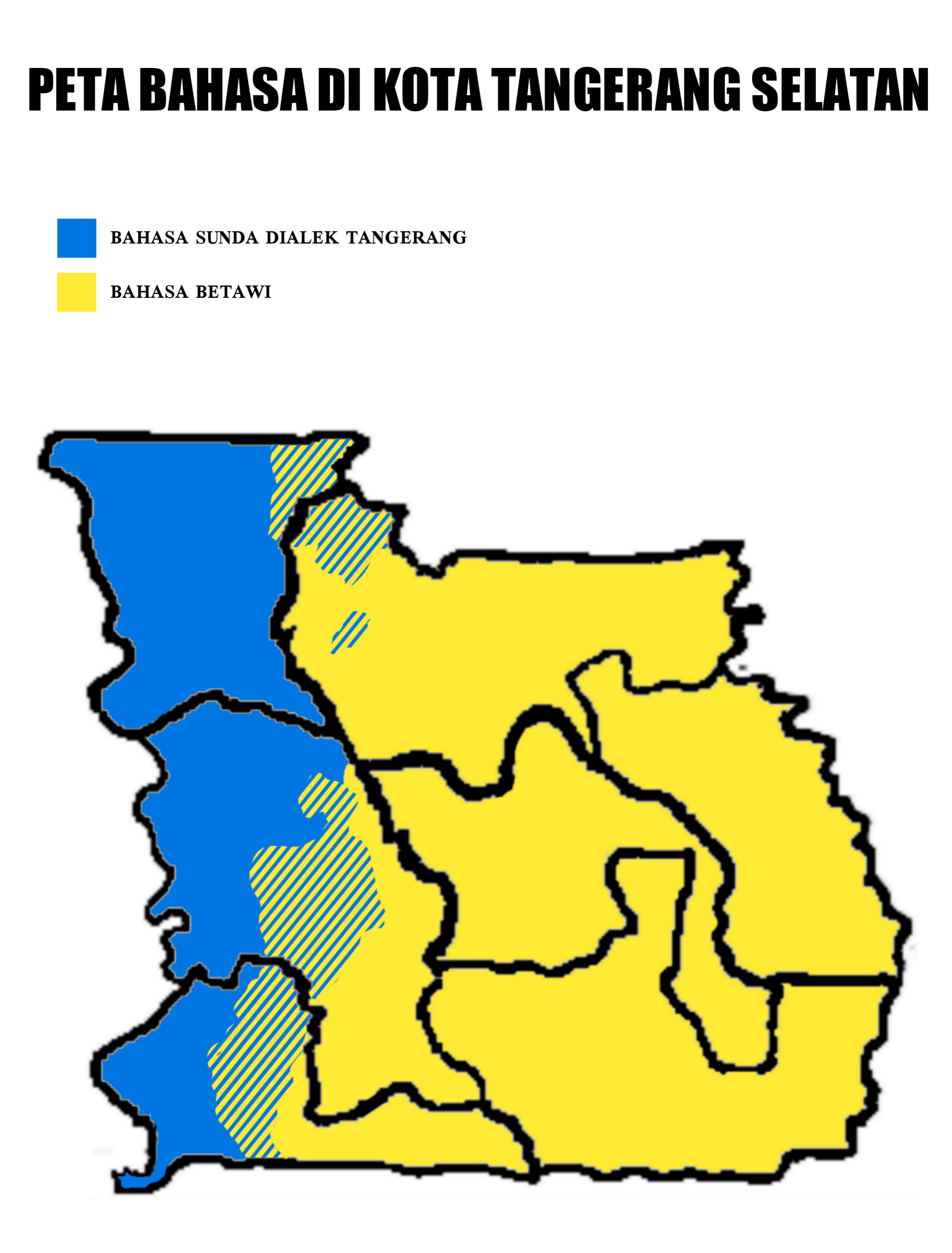
Languages map in South Tangerang.

The dominant languages used in South Tangerang are Betawi and Tangerang Sundanese languages. Betawi is spoken in almost all areas of South Tangerang, except in the western part along the Cisadane River. Meanwhile, Sundanese is spoken in the west along the Cisadane River, which is predominantly used in villages on the banks of the river, especially in North Serpong. In several communities located in the western part there are also several areas undergoing a language shift, which are mostly found in Serpong, Setu, and a small number of villages in the western part of Pondok Aren. In fact, there is a village in Setu district namely the Keranggan Ecotourism and Sundanese Culture Village (Kampung Ekowisata dan Budaya Sunda Keranggan), where almost all the people used to speak Sundanese (currently it is only spoken predominantly in 2 RT).

== Administrative districts ==
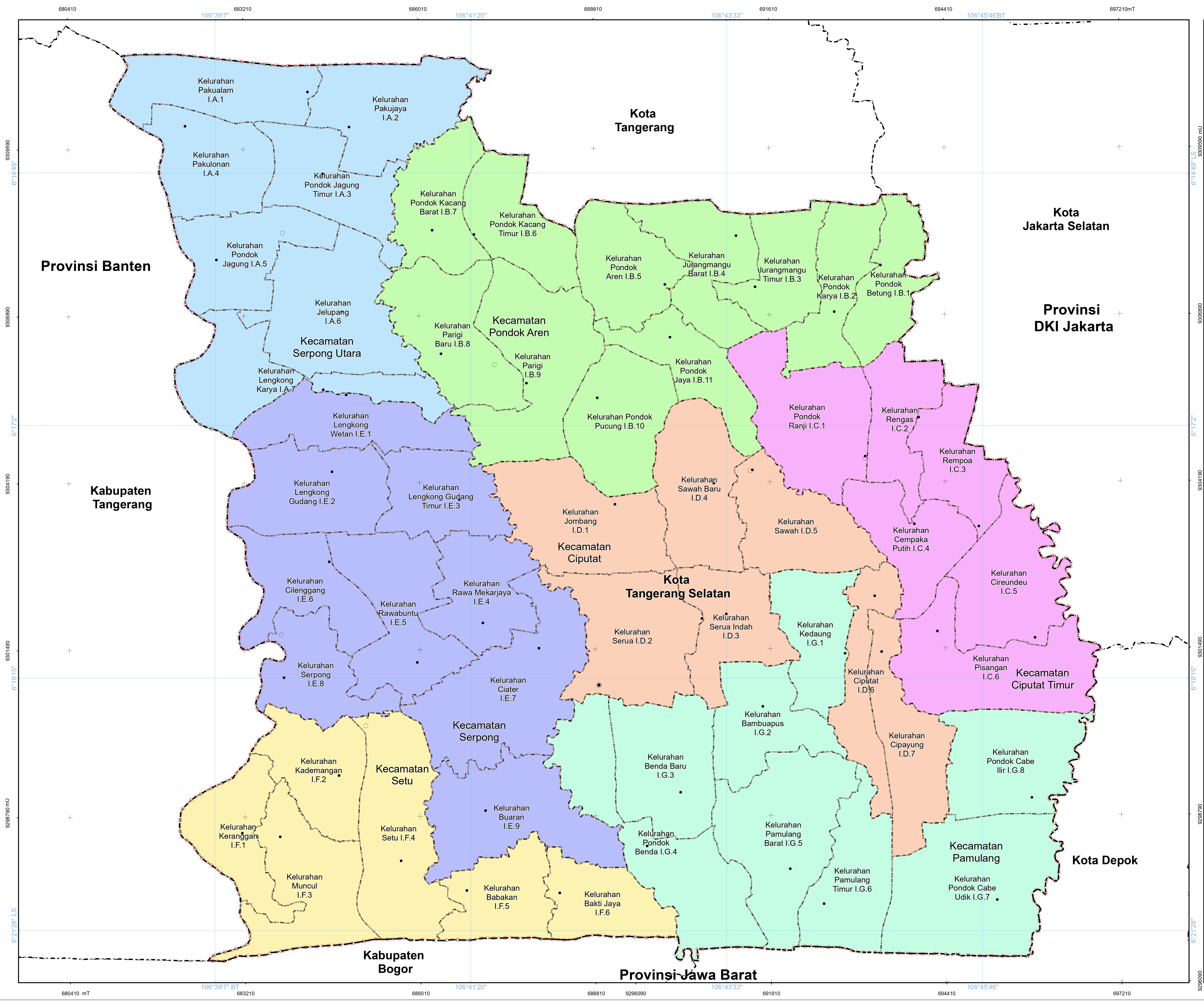
Districts (kecamatan) and urban villages (kelurahan) of South Tangerang

The municipality of South Tangerang is divided into seven districts (kecamatan), tabulated below with their areas and population totals from the 2010 Census and 2020 Census, together with the official estimates as of mid-2024. The centre of South Tangerang is the Ciputat district; the western districts of the city (Setu, Serpong and Serpong Utara) are much less densely populated than the eastern districts (Pamulang, Ciputat, Ciputat Timur and Pondok Aren). The table also includes the number of administrative villages (totaling 54 urban kelurahan) in each district, and its postal codes.

Kode Wilayah	Name of District (kecamatan)	Area in km^{2}	Pop'n Census 2010'	Pop'n Census 2020	Pop'n Estimate mid 2024	No. of vill- ages	Villages (kelurahan) (with their Post codes)
36.74.01	Serpong	28.27	137,212	154,744	166,720	9	Buaran (15310), Ciater (15310), Cilenggang (15310), Rawa Mekar Jaya (15310), Serpong (15311), Rawa Buntu (15318), Lengkong Gudang (15321), Lengkong Gudang Timur (15321), Lengkong Wetan (15322)
36.74.02	Serpong Utara (North Serpong)	22.36	126,499	134,008	141,000	7	Lengkong Karya (15320), Pakualam (15320), Jelupang (15323), Paku Jaya (15324), Pakulonan (15325), Pondok Jagung (15326), Pondok Jagung Timur (15326)
36.74.03	Pondok Aren	29.80	303,093	294,996	301,000	11	Pondok Jaya (15220), Pondok Betung (15221), Jurangmangu Timur (15222), Jurangmangu Barat (15223), Pondok Aren (15224), Pondok Karya (15225), Pondok Kacang Barat (15226), Pondok Kacang Timur (15226), Perigi Lama (15227), Perigi Baru (15228), Pondok Pucung (15229)
36.74.04	Ciputat	21.11	192,205	202,722	226,310	7	Cipayung (15411), Ciputat (15411), Sawah Baru (15413), Sawah Lama (15413), Jombang (15414), Serua (15414), Serua Indah (15414)
36.74.05	Ciputat Timur (East Ciputat)	17.81	178,818	172,139	171,250	6	Cempaka Putih (15412), Pondok Ranji (15412), Rempoa (15412), Rengas (15412), Cireundeu (15419), Pisangan (15419)
36.74.06	Pamulang	28.74	286,270	305,563	329,610	8	Kedaung (15415), Bambu Apus (15415), Pondok Benda (15416), Pamulang Barat (15417), Pamulang Timur (15417), Benda Baru (15418), Pondok Cabe Ilir (15418), Pondok Cabe Udik (15418)
36.74.07	Setu	16.76	66,225	84,178	93,630	6	Kranggan (15312), Kademangan (15313), Muncul (15314), Setu (15314), Babakan (15315), Bakti Jaya (15315)
	Totals	164.85	1,290,322	1,354,350	1,429,529	54	

== Government ==
=== Mayor ===
The Mayor of South Tangerang is the highest-ranking official within the South Tangerang City government. He reports to the Governor of Banten. The current mayor or regional head of South Tangerang City is Benyamin Davnie, with Pilar Saga Ichsan as vice mayor. They took office on 26 April 2021. The mayors have been:

Mayor of South Tangerang
Num.	Portrait	Mayor	Beginning of office	End of Term	Political Party / Faction	Period	Note.	Vice mayor
–		Mohammad Shaleh (Acting) (born 1952)	24 January 2009	18 July 2010	Independent	—		N/A
–		Eutik Suarta (Acting) (born 1953)	18 July 2010	24 January 2011	Independent	—		N/A
–		Hidayat Djohari (Acting) (born 1953)	24 January 2011	20 April 2011	Independent	—		N/A
1		Airin Rachmi Diany (born 1976)	20 April 2011	20 April 2016	Golkar	1 (2010)		Benyamin Davnie (2011–2021)
1		Airin Rachmi Diany (born 1976)	20 April 2016	20 April 2021	Golkar	2 (2015)		Benyamin Davnie (2011–2021)
–		Bambang Nurcahyo (Daily executive) (born 1970)	20 April 2021	26 April 2021	Independent	–		N/A
2		Benyamin Davnie (born 1958)	26 April 2021	24 September 2024	Golkar	3 (2020)		Pilar Saga Ichsan
–		Tabrani (Acting)	24 September 2024	23 November 2024	Independent	3 (2020)	(Note: Incumbent mayor and vice mayor on leave to campaign 2024 South Tangerang mayoral election.)	N/A
(2)		Benyamin Davnie (born 1958)	23 November 2024	20 February 2025	Gerindra	3 (2020)		Pilar Saga Ichsan
(2)		Benyamin Davnie (born 1958)	20 February 2025	Incumbent	Gerindra	4 (2024)		Pilar Saga Ichsan

== Climate ==
South Tangerang has a tropical rainforest climate (Köppen: Af) and situated in the alluvial lowland with moderate rainfall from May to September and heavy rainfall from October to April.

Climate data for South Tangerang
Month	Jan	Feb	Mar	Apr	May	Jun	Jul	Aug	Sep	Oct	Nov	Dec	Year
Mean daily maximum °C (°F)	30.3 (86.5)	30.5 (86.9)	31.3 (88.3)	32.1 (89.8)	32.4 (90.3)	32.3 (90.1)	32.4 (90.3)	32.9 (91.2)	33.2 (91.8)	33.2 (91.8)	32.5 (90.5)	31.6 (88.9)	32.1 (89.7)
Daily mean °C (°F)	26.5 (79.7)	26.6 (79.9)	27.0 (80.6)	27.6 (81.7)	27.7 (81.9)	27.3 (81.1)	27.0 (80.6)	27.3 (81.1)	27.5 (81.5)	27.9 (82.2)	27.7 (81.9)	27.2 (81.0)	27.3 (81.1)
Mean daily minimum °C (°F)	22.8 (73.0)	22.8 (73.0)	22.8 (73.0)	23.1 (73.6)	23.0 (73.4)	22.3 (72.1)	21.7 (71.1)	21.7 (71.1)	21.9 (71.4)	22.6 (72.7)	22.9 (73.2)	22.9 (73.2)	22.5 (72.6)
Average rainfall mm (inches)	352 (13.9)	276 (10.9)	254 (10.0)	226 (8.9)	195 (7.7)	109 (4.3)	90 (3.5)	105 (4.1)	122 (4.8)	167 (6.6)	204 (8.0)	228 (9.0)	2,328 (91.7)
Source: Climate-Data.org

== Transportation ==
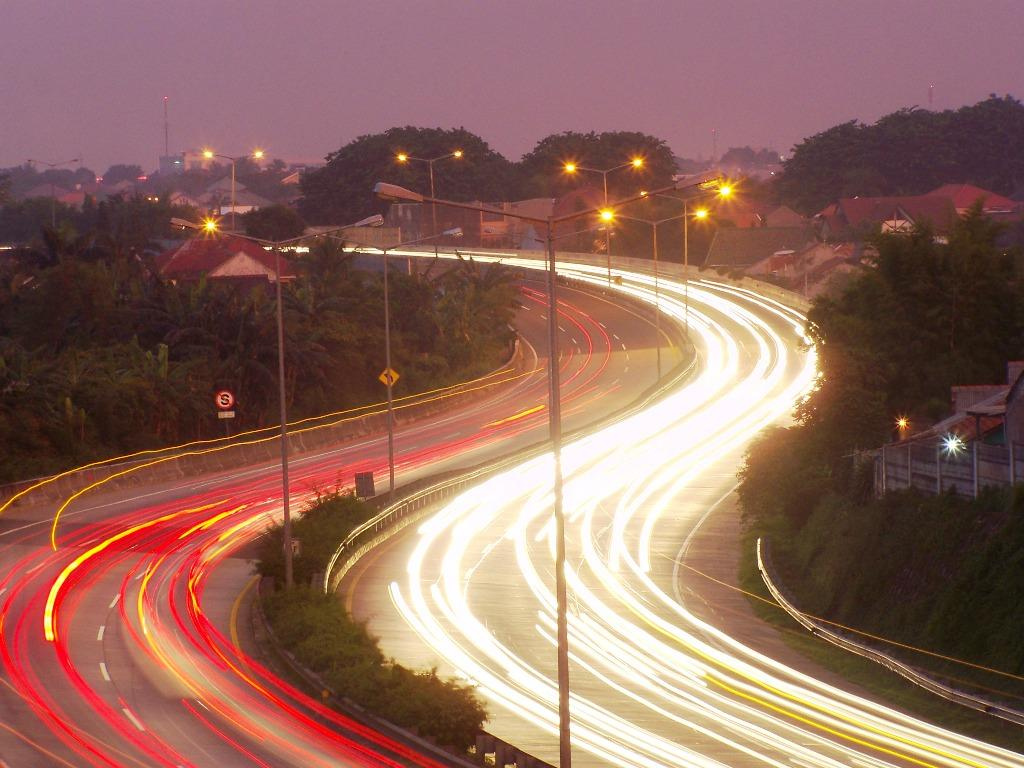
Jakarta-Serpong Toll Road

The city is served mainly by land transportation. Buses, minibuses and taxis are the main methods of transportation available. The public transportation mostly goes to Jakarta since many of the residents of South Tangerang commute to Jakarta on a daily basis. There are feeder buses for TransJakarta. The feeder buses goes from Bumi Serpong Damai and Bintaro Jaya to downtown Jakarta in Senayan.

Main road and highway in the city are:

Main road:

- Jl. Raya Serpong
- Jl. Pahlawan Seribu, BSD City
- Jl. Kapten Soebianto Djojohadjikusumo, BSD City
- Jl. Pelayangan, BSD City
- Jl. Ir. H. Juanda, Ciputat
- Jl. Ciater Raya
- Jl. Alam Sutera Boulevard
- Jl. Boulevard Bintaro Jaya

Highway:

- Jakarta-Serpong Toll Road (connecting Serpong and South Jakarta/JORR 1)
- Serpong-Cinere Toll Road (connecting Serpong and Cinere in Depok)
- Kunciran-Serpong Toll Road (connecting Kunciran in Tangerang City/Soekarno Hatta Airport and Serpong)
- Serpong-Balaraja Toll Road (in progress for section 1A) (connecting Serpong and Balaraja in Tangerang Regency)

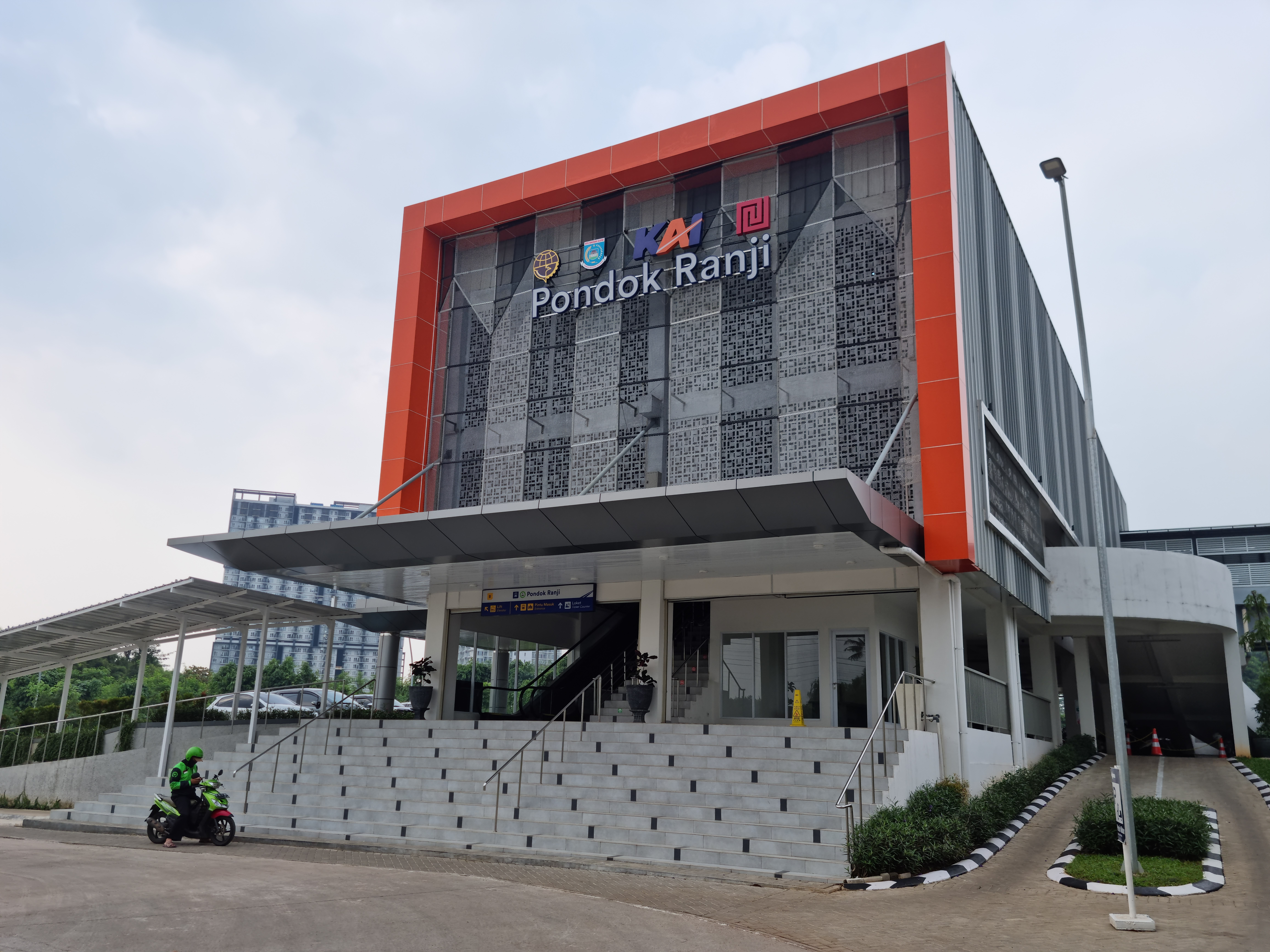
Pondok Ranji railway station

The city is also served by commuter rail service KRL Commuterline for those commuters who work in Jakarta. There are five stations located in South Tangerang, namely Jurangmangu, Pondok Ranji, Rawa Buntu, Serpong and Sudimara. All stations serves the Tanah Abang – Rangkasbitung Line.

=== MRT Jakarta (Future Planned) ===
In the future, South Tangerang City is planned to be part of the Jakarta MRT network, specifically along the route connecting Lebak Bulus to Pamulang. This planned MRT Jakarta Line will traverse key areas, starting at the Jakarta–Banten border and passing through notable landmarks such as Universitas Muhammadiyah Jakarta, Situ Gintung, UIN Syarif Hidayatullah, Pasar Ciputat, Ciputat Martadinata, Pamulang Toll Gate, Gaplek Flyover Pondok Cabe, and ending at Pondok Cabe Terminal.

The route will primarily follow major roads, including Ir. H. Juanda Road, Dewi Sartika Road in Ciputat, R.E. Martadinata Road in Ciputat, and Terminal Pondok Cabe Road.

=== Planned MRT Jakarta Stations on the Lebak Bulus–Pamulang Line ===
The proposed stations along this line are as follows:

- Ciputat Timur
- UIN
- Ciputat
- Ciputat Martadinata
- Ciputat Cipayung
- Polsek Pamulang
- Pondok Cabe

This line aims to enhance connectivity across South Tangerang, facilitating access to educational institutions, marketplaces, residential areas, and transportation hubs.

In the long term, the Jakarta MRT North-South Line is also planned to extend from Pondok Cabe in South Tangerang, Banten, to Ancol Marina in North Jakarta, creating a seamless transit connection between the southern and northern regions of Greater Jakarta.

There are two toll roads servicing the city, namely Jakarta–Serpong Toll Road and Jakarta–Tangerang Toll Road. There are also several toll roads currently under planning. The plans are for a Serpong-Balaraja Toll Road which will continue the Jakarta-Serpong toll road, and Jakarta Outer Ring Road 2 which will be connecting the city to Soekarno–Hatta International Airport in the near future. Kunciran-Serpong Toll Road and Serpong-Cinere Toll Road are the latest new infrastructure built in the city.

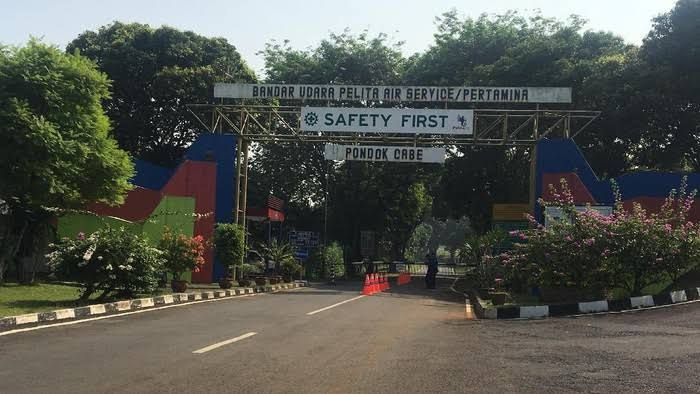
Gate of Pondok Cabe Airport

Pondok Cabe Airport – which is used for military and civilian services – is the only airport located within the city boundaries. It is owned by PT Pertamina, the national oil company. The airport is also used for the maintenance base for Pelita Air Service, also owned by PT Pertamina.

Cycle rickshaws (becak) are still available in some areas in the city. Becak is the only method of transportation currently forbidden to operate in Jakarta as its slow speed has allegedly led to congestion in the traffic of Jakarta. However, since South Tangerang is located on the outskirts of Jakarta (instead of the city proper), it is allowed in the city.

In April 2015, Corridor-2 of Trans Anggrek Circle Line which is similar to TransJakarta has been launched to serve public from Pondok Cabe Terminal to Rawa Buntu Station of KRL Jabodetabek. It was free until end of 2015, but only operated between 06:00–09:00, 11:00-14:00 and 16:00–18:00 with notation time of serve will be added as needed. The other seven corridors will be applied gradually.

== Shopping ==
South Tangerang offers some shopping center in the area, such as:

- Living World Alam Sutera
- Bintaro Xchange Mall
- Plaza Bintaro Jaya
- BSD Plaza
- TerasKota Entertainment Center BSD
- Transpark Mall Bintaro
- LOTTE Mall Bintaro
- ITC BSD
- Mall WTC Matahari Serpong
- BSD Junction
- Paradise Walk Serpong
- Transmart Mall Bintaro
- Serpong Plaza (former shopping centre, opened in 2003 and vacant since 2012)

== Education ==
Education in South Tangerang consists of the standard Elementary through High School facilities found in most of Indonesia, kindergartens are operated privately. Below are several notable schools in South Tangerang:

=== International Schools ===
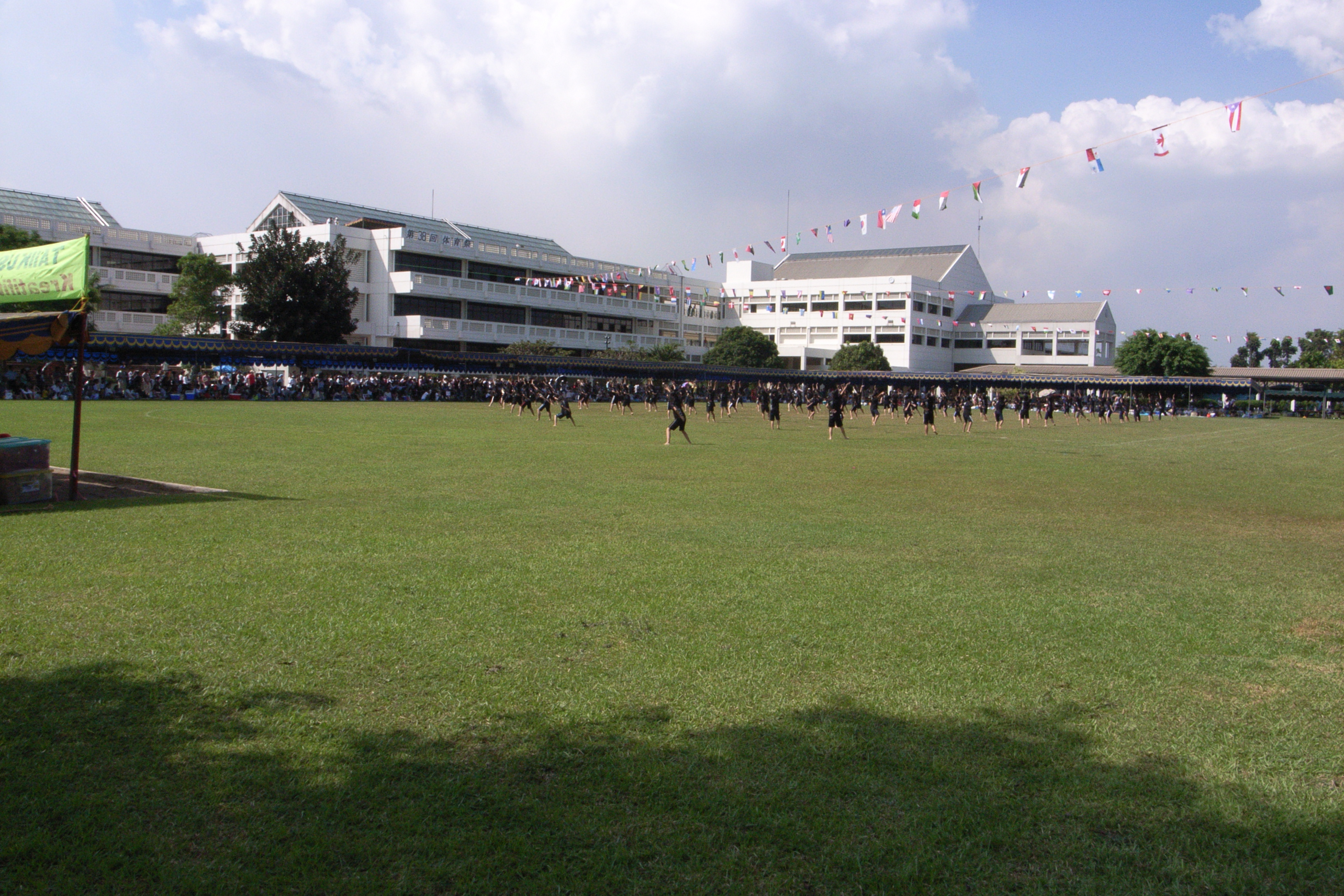
Jakarta Japanese School

- Jakarta Japanese School (Bintaro Jaya)
- Global Jaya School (Bintaro Jaya)
- German School Jakarta (BSD City)
- Sinarmas World Academy (BSD City)
- British School Jakarta (Bintaro Jaya)
- BINUS Serpong, Cambridge International School (BSD City)
- Mutiara Harapan Islamic School
- Khalifa IMS Bintaro, Cambridge International School
- Mentari Intercultural School Bintaro
- Insan Cendekia Madani School

=== Private Schools ===
- SMK Musik Yayasan Musik Jakarta
- Santa Ursula BSD
- Santa Laurensia School (Alam Sutera)
- BPK Penabur Bintaro Jaya
- SMA Plus Pembangunan Jaya
- SMA Efata Serpong
- SMA Candle Tree
- SMA Islam Cikal Harapan BSD
- SMA Islam Sinar Cendekia
- SMA Stella Maris BSD
- SMA Islam Al Azhar BSD
- Saint John Catholic School BSD
- Sekolah Athalia Villa Melati Mas
- Kharisma Bangsa School
- Sekolah Harapan Bangsa, Modernhill Pondok Cabe
- Ora Et Labora BSD
- TK SD SMP Ora Et Labora Pamulang
- SMK Pustek
- SMA Yaspita
- Strada Villa Melati Mas
- Solideo BSD
- SMAK PENABUR Bintaro Jaya
- SD Islam At Taqwa
- MI As Salaamah Pamulang
- SMA Muhammadiyah 25 Pamulang
- SMA Muhammadiyah 8 Ciputat
- SD SMP SMA Katolik Ricci 2
- TK SD SMP SMA Katolik Bhakti Prima
- Sekolah Mater Dei Pamulang
- SMK Sasmita Jaya (SMK Sasmita Jaya)
- TK SD SMP SMA Islam Terpadu Auliya
- Anderson School

=== Public Schools ===
- SMAN 1 Tangerang Selatan
- SMAN 2 Tangerang Selatan
- SMAN 3 Tangerang Selatan
- SMAN 4 Tangerang Selatan
- SMAN 5 Tangerang Selatan
- SMAN 6 Tangerang Selatan
- SMAN 8 Tangerang Selatan
- SMAN 9 Tangerang Selatan
- SMAN 10 Tangerang Selatan
- SMAN 11 Tangerang Selatan
- SMAN 12 Tangerang Selatan
- MAN Insan Cendekia

=== Public universities ===
- Universitas Terbuka
- UIN Syarif Hidayatullah

=== Government-affiliated colleges ===
- Sekolah Tinggi Akutansi Negara
- Geophysics and Meteorology Academy (Sekolah Tinggi Meteorologi Klimatologi dan Geofisika)

=== Private Universities ===
- Muhammadiyah Jakarta University (Universitas Muhammadiyah Jakarta)
- Pamulang University (Universitas Pamulang)
- Indonesian Institute of Technology (Institut Teknologi Indonesia)
- Pembangunan Jaya University (UPJ)
- Bina Sarana Informatika University (UBSI BSD)
- BINUS ASO School of Engineering
- International University Liaison Indonesia (IULI)
- South Tangerang Institute of Technology (ITTS)
- Sekolah Tinggi Internasional Konservatori Musik Indonesia (STIKMI)

== Sister cities ==
- Albany, New York, United States
- Kampong Tanjong Bunut, Brunei Darussalam

== See also ==
- Tangerang
- Tangerang Regency
- Jakarta metropolitan area
