= Bahar bin Sumayt =

Indonesian Islamic scholar (born 1985)

Habib Bahar bin Sumayt Ba 'Alawi
- بَحْرُ بْنُ سُمَيْطٍ
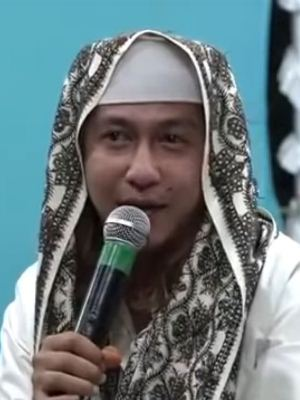
- Habib Bahar in Banjarmasin in 2018
- Born: 23 July 1985 (age 41); Manado, North Sulawesi, Indonesia
- Education: Darul Lughoh Wadda`wah
- Occupation: (da'i)
- Organization(s): Prophet’s Defender Council, Islamic Defenders Front
- Known for: Leader of Prophet’s Defender Council (or Defender Council of God's Messengers, Indonesian: Majelis Pembela Rasululah; 2007–present); Founder of Pondok Pesantren Tajul Alawiyyin
- Title: Habib, Sayyid
- Criminal charge: Child battery
- Criminal penalty: Three-year imprisonment
- Spouse: Fadlun Faisal Balghoits (m. 2009)
- Children: 4
- Parents: Ali bin Sumayt (father); Isnawati Ali (mother)

Habib Bahar bin Sumayt (Arabic: بَحْرُ بْنُ سُمَيْطٍ, romanized: Baḥr ibn Sumayṭ; Arabic pronunciation: [baħr ibn sumajtˤ] full name: (Arabic: سَيِّدُ بَحْرِ بْنِ عَلِيِّ بْنِ عَبْدِ الرَّحْمَنِ بْنِ سُمَيْطٍ, romanized: Sayyid Baḥr ibn ‘Alī ibn ‘Alawī ibn ‘Abd ar-Raḥmān ibn Sumayṭ); born 23 July 1985) is a preacher from Manado, North Sulawesi. Bahar is the leader and founder of the Prophet's Defender Council headquartered in Pondok Aren, South Tangerang. He is also the founder of Pondok Pesantren Tajul Alawiyyin in Kemang, Bogor Regency. Bahar is known as a preacher who often provokes the masses with negative language. In each of his lectures, Habib Bahar was always accompanied and closely guarded by Islamic Defenders Front (FPI), and he was frequently accompanied by the Multipurpose Ansor Front when he preached in a place where his people were affiliated with Nahdlatul Ulama.

== Activities ==
=== Organizational ===
Habib Bahar is the founder and leader of the Prophet's Defender Council since 2007. The headquarters of Council is located in Pondok Aren, South Tangerang. While the followers of Habib Bahar reached hundreds of people who live in Ciputat, South Tangerang; Pesanggrahan, South Jakarta; and Pondok Aren, South Tangerang. Together with members of the Prophet's Defender Council, Habib Bahar often conducts raids and forced closure at several entertainment venues in Jakarta. His most prominent action was when he coordinate about 150 people of the Prophet's Defender Council in Ramadan in 2012 to conduct raids in Cafe De Most in Pesanggrahan, South Jakarta. It was done them because the cafe was suspected as a nest of immorality, he then forcibly shut down Cafe De Most and requested that the place be closed for a whole month during Ramadan.

In addition, Habib Bahar also established Pondok Pesantren Tajul Alawiyyin which adopted the salaf system in Pabuaran, Kemang, Bogor Regency. He is also known to be close to the Islamic mass organization formed by Habib Muhammad Rizieq Shihab, the Islamic Defenders Front. In fact, in addition to Habib Rizieq, Habib Bahar is also the main character who drive of a series of Defending Islam Action which demands that Basuki Tjahaja Purnama be tried to his statement which is considered insulting to Islam.

=== Da‘wah ===
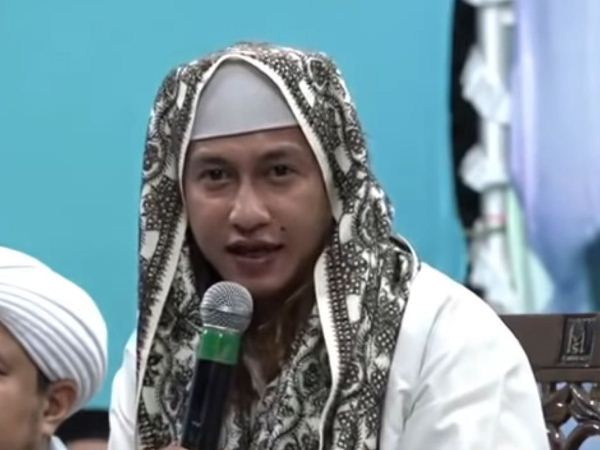
Habib Bahar bin Smith while filling in a lecture at the 82nd event to remember the death of Habib Salim bin Hamid Al-Kaff in Banjarmasin in 2018

Habib Bahar often preaches at various events commemorating the great day of Islam, such as the Mawlid of the Prophet and the Isra Mi'raj. In each of his lectures, Habib Bahar was always accompanied and closely guarded by the Islamic Defenders Front and often harsh and impressed opposite with the Banser of Nahdlatul Ulama. However, not infrequently he was accompanied and escorted by Banser while preaching in a place where his people are affiliated with Nahdlatul Ulama, such as when he is preaching in unhealthy conditions at Pondok Pesantren Modern Al-Husainy, South Tangerang, led by Habib Ali Alwi. Habib Ali Alwi who is known to be close to Nahdlatul Ulama immediately asked Banser to escort Habib Bahar on specifically when preaching with the infusion hoses that are still attached.

== Controversies ==
These activities have received high concern from police and judicial authorities. Al Habib Bahar has also received lengthy criticisms from Indonesian activist Guru Gembul.

=== Sweeping action ===
As the leader of the Prophet's Defender Council, Habib Bahar and his followers often conduct sweeping actions and forced closure of several nightclubs that operates in South Jakarta and South Tangerang that are considered to violate the Shari'a. Amid the month of Ramadan on 29 July 2012, at around 01:30 in the morning, he coordinated around 150 people of the Prophet's Defender Council to conduct a sweeping action accompanied by a destructive action in Cafe De Most located at Jalan Veteran Raya, Bintaro, Pesanggrahan, South Jakarta. In the action, they demanded that the cafe closes its business for a whole month during Ramadan. In addition, the masses also equip themselves with sharp weapons such as celurit, machetes, golf sticks and others. In fact, sharp weapons equipment was made especially before the action, like four swords that was made a week before the incident.

The action was planned 2 weeks earlier. The plan, after the action in Pesanggrahan, Habib Bahar and his congregation will conduct raids in the Cafe Putri, Cipulir, Kebayoran Lama. From Cipulir, the masses plan to raid other cafés in Ciledug, Tangerang. However, not yet to these locations, the police are informed of the sweeping action in the Cafe De Most conducted by mass organizations of the Prophet's Defender Council, the police then immediately conduct security. The action they got intercepted from the combined officers Polresta Tangerang, Polsek Pondok Aren, Koramil 19 Pondok Aren, and Satpol PP Pondok Aren.

=== Arrest of Habib Bahar in Pesanggrahan ===
Police subsequently arrested Habib Bahar and his 62 followers, and confiscated 1 machete, 1 celurit, 4 swords, 4 golf clubs, 1 iron stick, 1 timber, 1 flag of the Prophet's Defender Council, and a set of cafe instruments. Of the 62 people arrested, 41 of them were minors. In fact, there is a 13-year-old boy who participated in the sweeping action. Police subsequently stipulate 23 people including Habib Bahar as a suspect because they were proven to be destructive with sharp weapons, two of whom were minors caught with machetes and celurit. On that matter, the Indonesian Child Protection Commission (KPAI) deeply regretted the involvement of children in the action. The KPAI also asked officers to provide suspension of detention to both children.

Police later ensnared Habib Bahar and his followers with Article 170 of the Criminal Code about destruction with the threat of a five-year sentence. In addition, they were also charged under Article 2 of the Emergency Law number 12 of 1951 with the threat of a 12-year sentence. Meanwhile, two minors who become suspects can be punished with the threat of six years in prison under the 1951 Emergency Act for carrying sharp weapons, and two and a half years for destroying private property. After brief detention and interrogation, Habib Bahar pleaded guilty and regretted not reporting to the police related to the violation committed by Cafe De Most for selling alcoholic beverages.

In addition to engaging in sweeping action in 2012, in 2010, Habib Bahar has also been involved in the attack on the Ahmadiyya congregation in Kebayoran Baru, South Jakarta. In addition, in the same year, Habib Bahar has also been involved in Koja Riot related to Mbah Priok grave dispute in North Jakarta.

=== Provoking through da'wah ===
Habib Bahar is known as a preacher who is often considered to provoke the masses. In his lectures circulating in social media, he often catapulted a lecture that provoked Muslims to perform enjoining good and forbidding wrong (Arabic: الأمر بالمَعْرُوف والنَهي عن المُنْكَر, romanized: al-amr bi-l-maʿrūf wa-n-nahy ʿani-l-munkar) with a behavior that is considered a violent act. In addition, in his speech he also often mentioned that the Indonesian Democratic Party of Struggle (PDI-P) is the nest of the Indonesian Communist Party (PKI). Related to this, the organization of the Islamic wing of PDI-P, Central Executive of Baitul Muslimin Indonesia (PP Bamusi) criticized Habib Bahar's statement. Bamusi insinuates that Habib Bahar lacks reading and literature, as well as the allegations made to PDI-P without explanation and clarification from the accused party has become a slander and damages the image of religious speakers.

==== Anti-Jokowi preaching ====
In November 2018, his video preaching in a mosque went viral. Amid an ill-tempered elections process, he described PDI-P cadre and President Joko Widodo as the nation's, state's, and people's traitor. He also denounced the president as a transgender and asked the congregation to open his pants to see whether he has menstrual blood on. Furthermore, he accused President Widodo to only prosper non-Muslims (kafir), Chinese Indonesians, and Western companies and enslaves the native Indonesians. He also blamed the Muslims for not electing FPI-backed Prabowo Subianto in the previous election. He was reported to the Indonesian National Police on 28 November 2018.

=== Child assault case ===
On 5 December 2018, Bahar was reported to the police after assaulting two teenage boys that were jesting as Habib Bahar. Bahar told his santris to find the boys. Once being brought to him, in addition to beating the boys. Bahar also interrogated and shaved the heads of the victims. According to the medical report, the victims suffered injuries in their eyes, cheeks, legs, and also from light head injury. During the beating of the victims, 15 of the students of Bahar were also involved in the incident.

On 18 December, Bahar was arrested after undergoing an investigation. Bahar claimed to be exercising martial arts with the victims instead of beating them. Opposing party politician and Prabowo's right-hand man Fadli Zon said that Bahar's arrest is a proof of "ulama criminalization". On 9 July 2019, he was found guilty and sentenced to 3 years in jail.

=== Large-scale social distancing violation ===
On May 16, 2020, Bahar was released early on Prisoner Assimilation Program carried out by The Minister of Law and Human Rights Yasonna Laoly. However, he was re-arrested 3 days later for violating the large-scale social distancing restriction by gathering masses for a preaching. His lawyer, Aziz Yanuar suspected that his re-arrest was related to his speech on Saturday night after the speech went viral and greatly offended the authorities.

=== Allegations of battery of online taxi driver ===
On 2018, Bahar allegedly beat an online taxi driver near his residence in Tanah Sereal, Bogor. The dispute between Bahar and driver allegedly started because of Bahar's anger with his wife for going home too late, and the driver became the outlet of Bahar's anger. In November 2020, Bahar was charged for the crime. During the investigation, Bahar refused to provide information to the police and preferred to go to trial concerning the case. Bahar's lawyer stated that Bahar and the driver had made an out-of-court settlement, and the victim had retracted their police report.

=== Hate speech ===
On 7 December 2021, Bahar, along with another Islamic scholar Eggi Sudjana was reported to the police by Husin Shahab, secretary-general of the Eradication Committee of Law Mafia (KPMH), for their hate speech. Bahar threatens to report back Husin by alleging him for spreading hoaxes. The vice secretary-general of 212 Alumni Brotherhood (PA 212), Novel Bamukmin also mentions other names that must be processed: Dudung Abdurachman, Sukmawati Soekarnoputri, Muwafiq, Ade Armando, Guntur Romli, Abu Janda, Viktor Laiskodat, and Habib Kribo.

In response to the reporting of Bahar, residents of Surabaya protested and pressured the head of Indonesian National Police to capture Bahar.
