= Pondok Indah =

Residential area in Jakarta, Indonesia

Coordinates: 6°17′S 106°47′E

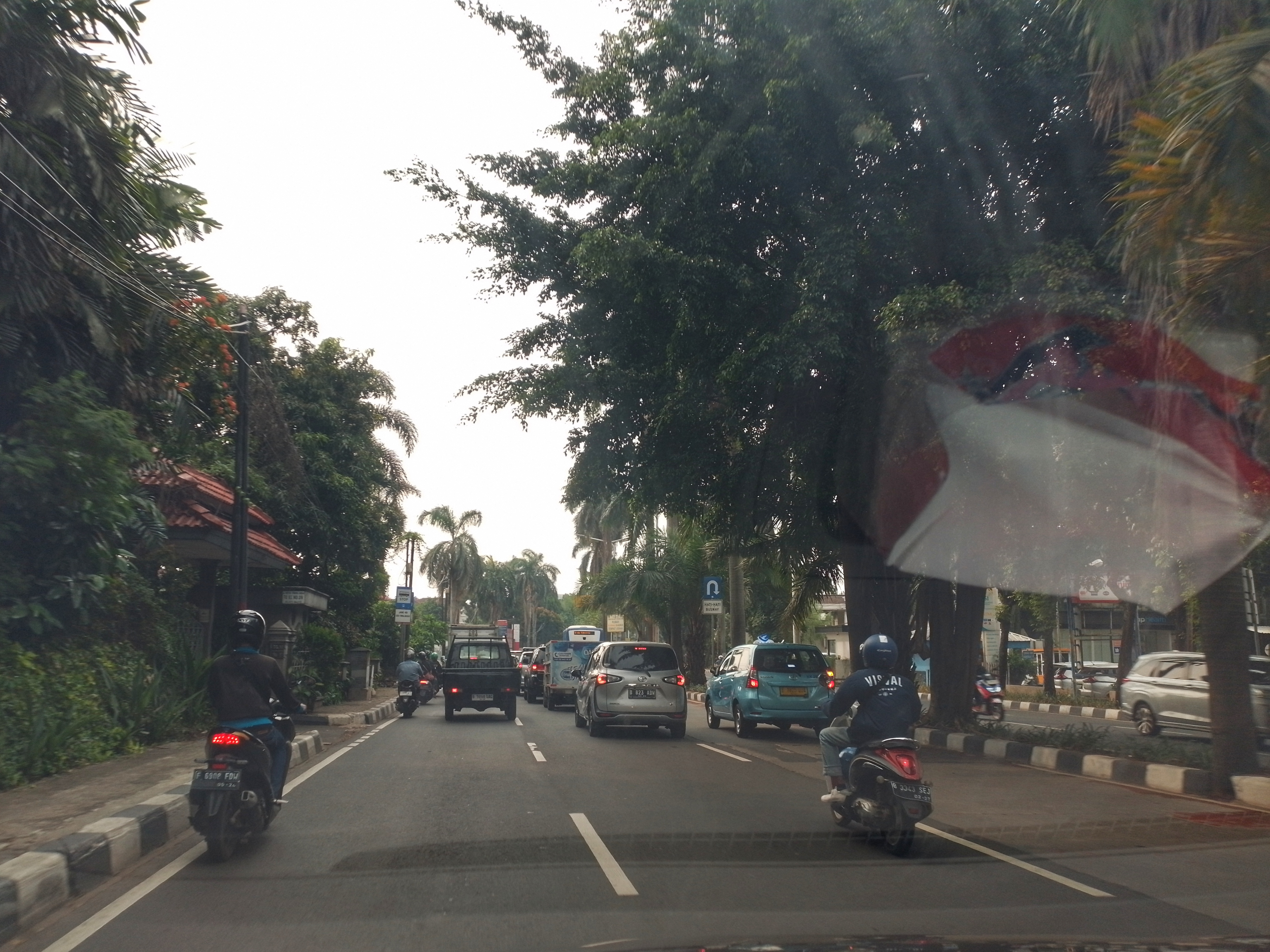
- The Metro Pondok Indah street as the main street of Pondok Indah residence
- Interactive map of Pondok Indah
- Location: Pesanggrahan, Kebayoran Lama, South Jakarta, Jakarta, Indonesia.
- Status: Completed
- Groundbreaking: c. 1970s
- Website: https://pondokindahgroup.co.id/pondok-indah-city-center

Companies
- Owner: Metropolitan Kentjana
- Manager: Pondok Indah Group

Technical details
- Size: 661,54ha

Pondok Indah is an upscale residential area in South Jakarta, Indonesia. It is one of the most prestigious suburbs in both Jakarta, and Indonesia. Pondok Indah is a much sought-after suburb by expatriates, conglomerates, celebrities, and government officials.

Houses in this suburb can cost millions of U.S. dollars. In 2021, the price range of houses in the suburb was equal to Beverly Hills, California.

Landmarks in the suburb include Pondok Indah Mall (one of the top five shopping malls in Indonesia according to Forbes), Pondok Indah Hospital, and Pondok Indah Golf Course.

== History ==
=== Background ===
Pondok Indah area was previously a vast expanse of fields, rice fields, and rubber and secondary crop plantations. At one point, the area was visited by a famous architect and urban developer, Ciputra. According to him, the plantation occupied a strategic area, as it was bordered by Jalan Ciputat Raya (which was previously part of the National Road from Jakarta to Bogor that passed through Palmerah, Ciputat, and Parung) to the west and Lebak Bulus to the south. The plantation was located near Kebayoran Baru (the first modern satellite city in Indonesia) and was not a flood-prone area. In addition the soil did not contain salt like in the northern region of Jakarta. The area was also still a stretch of light forest and a source of clean water.

Ciputra felt that Jakarta would undergoe a population boom in the 1970s and predicted that a large number of vertical housing would occupy Jakarta in the future. Based on this line of reasoning, he sought to redevelop the plantation area into a new satellite city.

=== Realization ===
On developing Pondok Indah, Ciputra partnered with Sudono Salim. At the time Salim wanted to develop Sunter area, Jakarta. Pitching the plantation's better soil and air quality compared to Sunter, Salim agreed to work together and finance the development of Pondok Indah. He later said:

The area can be turned into a luxurious residence that will continue to shine from time to time. I can make a master plan right away. Regarding the permit to work on a project in this area, I can talk to Mr. Ali Sadikin immediately.

—

=== Early development ===
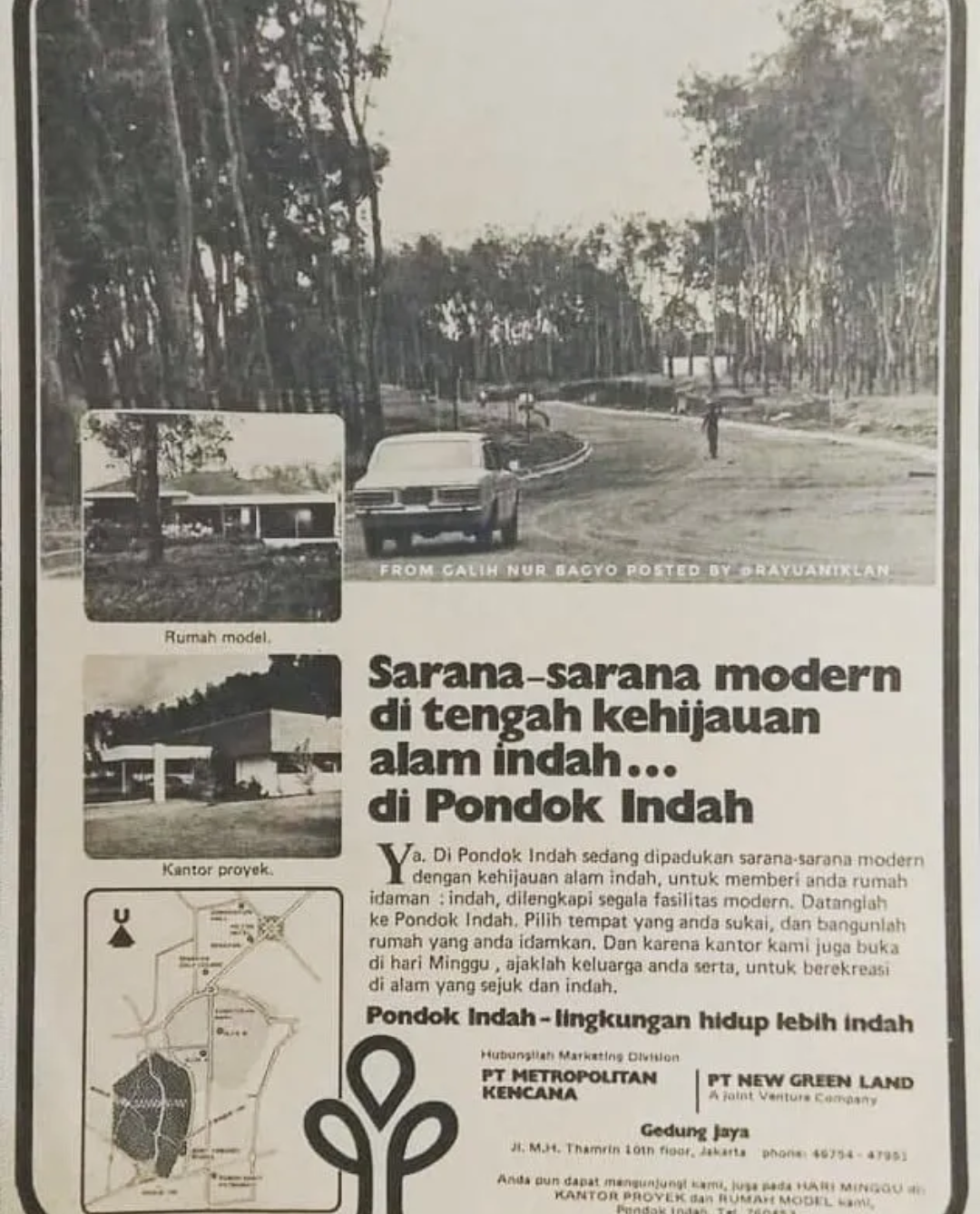
The advertisement of Pondok Indah c. 1970s–1980s

Ciputra and his colleagues started the development in the 70s. He only built a few houses, since Ciputra felt that the elites who would want to move to the area would prefer to design and build their own houses.

Ciputra was worried because the expense to acquire land and build road infrastructure and waterways was enormous. Therefore, they first built small houses in the north of Pondok Indah to raise quick funds. These were sold out quickly. Interest came from both "old" and "new" money.

== Facilities ==
=== Shopping Mall and Commercial Area ===
- Pondok Indah Mall (abbreviated as "PIM") is the main landmark of the area and considered by Forbes as one of the best shopping malls in Jakarta. The mall includes place of interests such as:
  - The mall itself, consists of four interconnected main buildings (PIM1, PIM2, PIM Street Gallery, PIM3)
  - Pondok Indah Water park
  - Pondok Indah Office Towers, abbreviated as PIOT, which has 3 towers
  - Pondok Indah Golf course (venue of the 1983 Golf World Cup)
  - The InterContinental Hotel Pondok Indah
- Metro Duta is the commercial area, located next to Pondok Indah Hospital, with connection to Transjakarta Corridor 8, and tenants such as Starbucks McDonald's, KFC, Burger King, Yoshinoya, and main banking area for Pondok Indah.
- Niaga Hijau commercial area which next to Metro Duta, which has "Wisma BCA", and "Menara Pondok Indah" (colloquially known as "Menara Citibank" before the bank ceased its operation in Indonesia), and Swiss-Belhotel Pondok Indah.
- THB-34 or colloquially known as Pertok, which caters hawker style food stalls.
- Pondok Indah Plaza 6 which known for the anchor tenant "Ranch Market"
- Decathlon Pondok Indah

=== Education ===
Bakti Mulya 400
An Islamic private school offering the national curriculum combined with the Cambridge International program (CIE) for kindergarten through high school students.

Tirta Marta BPK Penabur
A Christian private school operating under the BPK Penabur educational board, offering national and international programs.

Raffles Christian School
An international school following the Cambridge curriculum (IGCSE and A-Levels) for students from primary to pre-university levels.

SDI Harapan Ibu
An Islamic private school providing education from kindergarten to high school levels using the national curriculum.

HighScope Indonesia, Pondok Indah
A dual-curriculum school applying the US-based HighScope active learning approach integrated with Indonesian national standards, serving preschool through high school.

Trisakti Institute of Tourism
A higher education institution specializing in tourism and hospitality management degrees.

The Independent School of Jakarta
A British international school for children aged 2 to 13, following the English National Curriculum.

=== Healthcare ===
- Pondok Indah Hospital - Pondok Indah

=== Accommodation ===
- InterContinental Jakarta Pondok Indah (adjoined with PIM2)
- Swiss-Belhotel Pondok Indah

=== Religious Facilities ===
- Pondok Indah Grand Mosque
- Indonesian Christian Church (GKI) Pondok Indah
- The Collective Church Pondok Indah

=== Housing ===
- Aurelle Pondok Indah
- Pondok Indah Townhouse
- Villa Anggrek
- Pinang Residence (Developed by Intiland Development)

=== Nearby Place of Interest around Pondok Indah Area ===
- Gandaria City, an upscale shopping mall adjacent to Sheraton Hotel
- Poin Square, a shopping center which adjacent to Lebak Bulus MRT station
