= Tanah Kusir Cemetery =

Cemetery in South Jakarta, Indonesia

Tanah Kusir
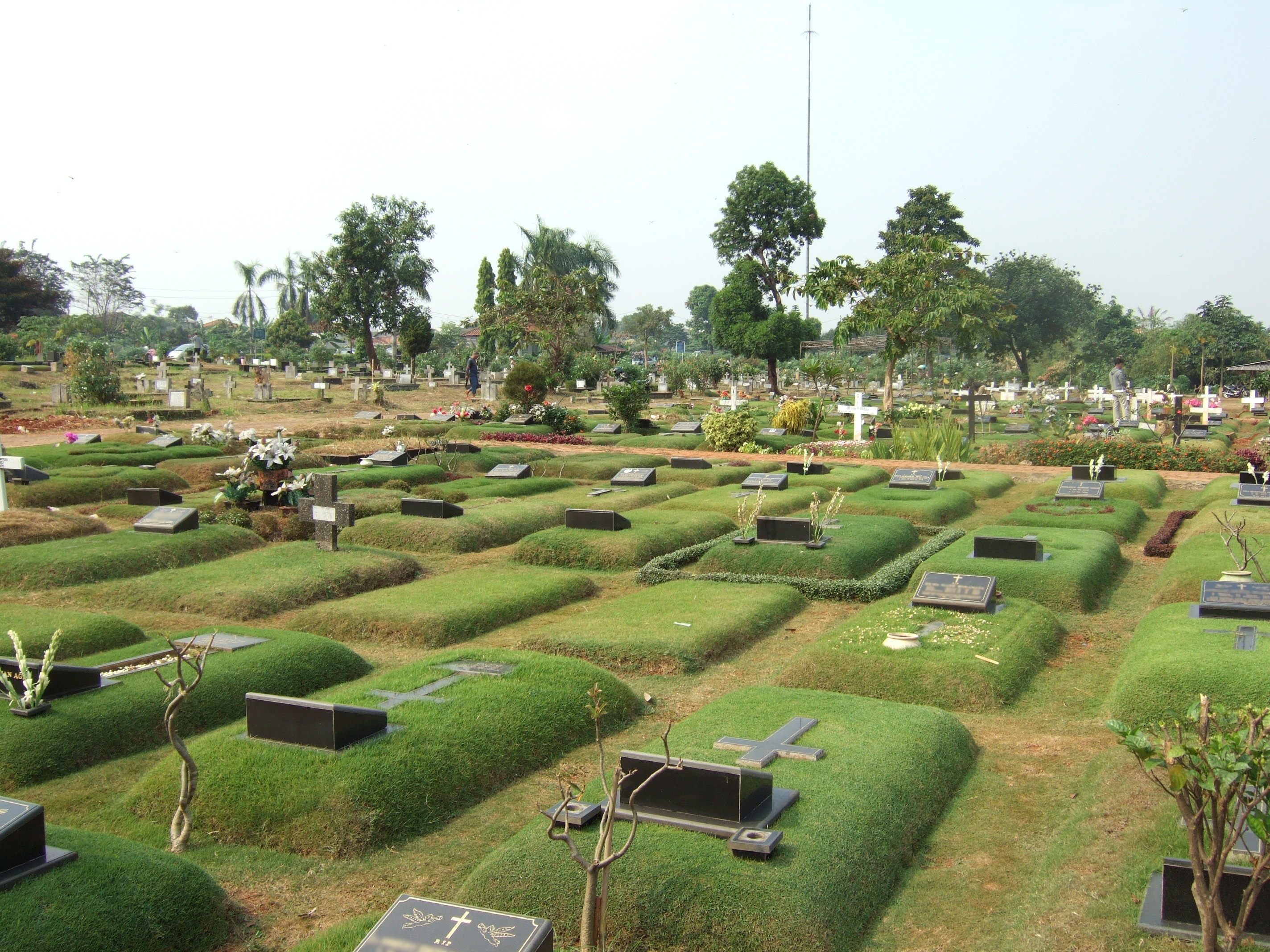
- Graves in Tanah Kusir
- Interactive map of Tanah Kusir

Details
- Established: 1 February 1965
- Location: South Jakarta
- Country: Indonesia
- Coordinates: 6.25301°S 106.77198°E
- Type: Public

Tanah Kusir Public Cemetery (Indonesian: Taman Pemakaman Umum Tanah Kusir) is one of the largest and most prominent public cemeteries in Jakarta, Indonesia. Located in the Kebayoran Lama area of South Jakarta, it serves as the final resting place for many notable national figures, including politicians, national heroes, religious leaders, and artists.

== History ==
The name "Tanah Kusir" originates from a historical account dating back to the Dutch colonial period. The land was originally owned by a Chinese-Indonesian landlord. During a gathering attended by important guests, including Dutch officials, an embarrassing incident occurred when the landlord accidentally passed gas. To avoid embarrassment to the landlord, his carriage driver (Indonesian: kusir) took responsibility for the incident. The landlord expressed his gratitude by rewarding the driver with a plot of land (Indonesian: Tanah), which later became known as Tanah Kusir.

Tanah Kusir was formally designated as a public cemetery in 1965, in response to Jakarta's growing need for burial space. As Jakarta expanded, the cemetery remained in use and developed into one of the city's major public burial sites.

== Notable burials ==
One of the most prominent individuals buried at Tanah Kusir is Mohammad Hatta, Indonesia's first vice president. According to a collection of his writings, Hatta refused burial in a heroes' cemetery, stating that he considered himself an ordinary citizen. After his death in 1980, he was buried at Tanah Kusir in accordance with his wishes. In recognition of his contribution to Indonesia's independence, President Suharto later transformed Hatta's grave into a memorial site. Hatta is buried alongside his wife, Rahmi Rachim, inside a Balinese-style structure that has become one of the cemetery's most visited locations.

Tanah Kusir is also the burial site of other prominent figures, including national hero and diplomat AR Baswedan, former Jakarta governor Ali Sadikin, and Islamic scholar and writer Buya Hamka. In more recent years, the cemetery has continued to receive public attention following the burial of contemporary public figures from Indonesia's cultural and entertainment sectors, such as Titiek Puspa.
