= Guru Gembul =

Indonesian activist and philosopher

- Born: 1985 (age 40–41)
- Education: Indonesia University of Education
- Occupations: Teacher; content creator; activist
- Known for: Criticism of Bahar bin Smith; Philosophical debate with Muhammad Nuruddin

YouTube information
- Channel: guru gembul
- Years active: 2019–present
- Genres: Religion; history; sociology; politics; philosophy
- Subscribers: 1.77 million
- Views: 396 million
- Last updated: 22 June 2026

Guru Gembul (lit. 'Chubby Teacher', c. 15 February 1985) is an Indonesian activist, historian, teacher, and content creator, known for his social media content.

== Name ==
In Javanese, the word gembul is an adjective meaning "overeating", while guru is "teacher" or "coach". According to a number of local publications, he is known to be originally named Jafar Rohadi, but this was immediately denied by him. The word gembul also represents a portmanteau of gemar ngibul from Rocky Gerung, a phrase translated as "enjoying vague discussions" from Indonesian.

The expression Baraya is frequently used by him. It is a Sundanese word meaning "sibling", but is used by Guru Gembul at a wide connotation, and so approximating "fellow" in meaning and usage.

== Life ==
Guru Gembul's personal life is very secretive and his real identity is still a mystery, Guru Gembul is thought to be named "Johan Riyadi", "Jafar Rohadi", or "Jafar Riyadi", but this was later denied by him directly. He is known to be a graduate of Indonesia University of Education. Guru Gembul stated that he is a teacher at a school in Bandung, while his monthly income from his YouTube channel is estimated to reach $1,7K to $27,2K or around IDR 26,134,100 to IDR 372,026,600. Thus, his income in a year is around $20,4K to $326,1K or around IDR to IDR 5,013,135,300. Autobiographically, Guru Gembul has an experience teaching social science at a high school in Bandung.

== Activity ==
Gembul started his career on YouTube and made videos discussing science, technology, social philosophy, and conspiracy theories. His thoughts on moderate Islam and his criticism of religious communities in Indonesia made his content quite popular in Indonesia. Guru Gembul emphasized that he was neither a Sunni nor a Shia, and that he did not follow any Islamic sect. As a result of his criticism of the "kaum Habaib" which is translated as people who respect the habibs, Guru Gembul was accused of being an extremist.

His conflict with Bahar bin Smith, one of Indonesia's habib and ulama, began when Guru Gembul noticed that Bahar could not read the kitab kuning, a set of Arabic-language educational texts in the Islamic curriculum commonly used in boarding schools in Indonesia, correctly. Guru Gembul regretted this, and called Bahar bin Smith a "fake cleric", and doubted Bahar's lineage as a respected habib. Guru Gembul then highlighted the use of false hadith in Bahar's statement which asserted that he was truly a descendant of the Islamic prophet Muhammad. Rhoma Irama and Zein Assegaf, other public figures who were also in conflict with Bahar at that time, agreed with Guru Gembul's statement, regretting that this had happened to a cleric. Furthermore, Rhoma and Guru Gembul challenged Bahar to prove the authenticity of his lineage through a DNA test, this offended Bahar, stating that he could agree to it, but with a number of conditions.

In a seminar in Bandung, Guru Gembul criticized the education system in Indonesia, and pushed for changes to the education system. He also criticized the low salaries given to teachers in Indonesia, which he said was what triggered the decline in the quality of Indonesian education.

== Controversy ==
In 2023, as a result of his criticism of teachers and education in Indonesia, five education activists sent an open letter containing a summons to Guru Gembul for his statement in a national education talk show broadcast on BTV on June 1, 2023. Activists considered Guru Gembul's statement about teacher competence to be an insult to the teaching profession. In his clarification, Guru Gembul said that he only criticized the Education and Teacher Training Institution (LPTK) that prepares teachers, further stating that his statement had been misunderstood and should not have resulted in a summons. The issue was later resolved amicably, with all parties agreeing that "only some teachers were incompetent".

== Content ==
Speeches delivered by Guru Gembul takes the summary of typically wielding concrete examples. His popularity is linked with the simplicity of expression used by him to the people. He says that his stance about religious matters and education is not the best and asks his viewers not to take his content "raw". He has featured in podcasts, including Close the Door by Deddy Corbuzier.

=== Ba'alawi criticisms ===
Guru Gembul is known to question the background authenticity of Ba'alawi members. Al-Habib Bahar bin Smith, a Ba'Alwi, was criticized in a book because he incorrectly translated a number of hadiths. Guru Gembul also describes the hadiths Bahar spread to his followers as "weak" or "faint". In addition, he doubted Bahar bin Smith's ability to perform da'wah while having a pesantren with thousands of santris and called him a "fake ulama" (ulama gadungan).

== Bibliography ==
- 50 Muslim Paling Berpengaruh dalam Sejarah Peradaban Islam: Sejarah yang Terlupakan (Eng: 50 Most Influence of Moslem in Islamic Civilization: The Forgotten History) (2024).
- Beyond Belief: Fact or Fiction (2024).
- Ngomongin Filsafat, Ah! (Eng: Talking about Philosophy) (2025).
- Ngomongin Logical Fallacies: Memahami Cacat Logika dalam Kehidupan Sehari-hari (Eng: Talking about Logical Fallacies: Understanding Logical Flaw in Everyday Life) (2025)
- Menggugat Indonesia (Eng: Challenging Indonesia) (2026)
