= Pesanggrahan =

District in South Jakarta, Indonesia

- District
- Location in South Jakarta
- Country: Indonesia
- Province: Jakarta
- Administrative city: South Jakarta

Pesanggrahan is a district (Indonesian: kecamatan) in the administrative city of South Jakarta, Indonesia. The name Pesanggrahan is derived from Pesanggrahan River, which flows along the eastern edge of the district. Pesanggrahan was originally part of the district Kebayoran Lama, but was later split into a separate district. Pesanggrahan is bordered by the cities of Tangerang and South Tangerang to the west, West Jakarta to the north, and the district of Kebayoran Lama to the east.

A southwestern portion of the Jakarta Outer Ring Road and the Jakarta–Serpong railway passed through Pesanggrahan district.

== Subdistricts ==
The district of Pesanggrahan is divided into five subdistricts (kelurahan):

Name	Area code
Ulujami	12250
Petukangan Utara	12260
Petukangan Selatan	12270
Pesanggrahan	12320
Bintaro	12330

== Landmarks ==
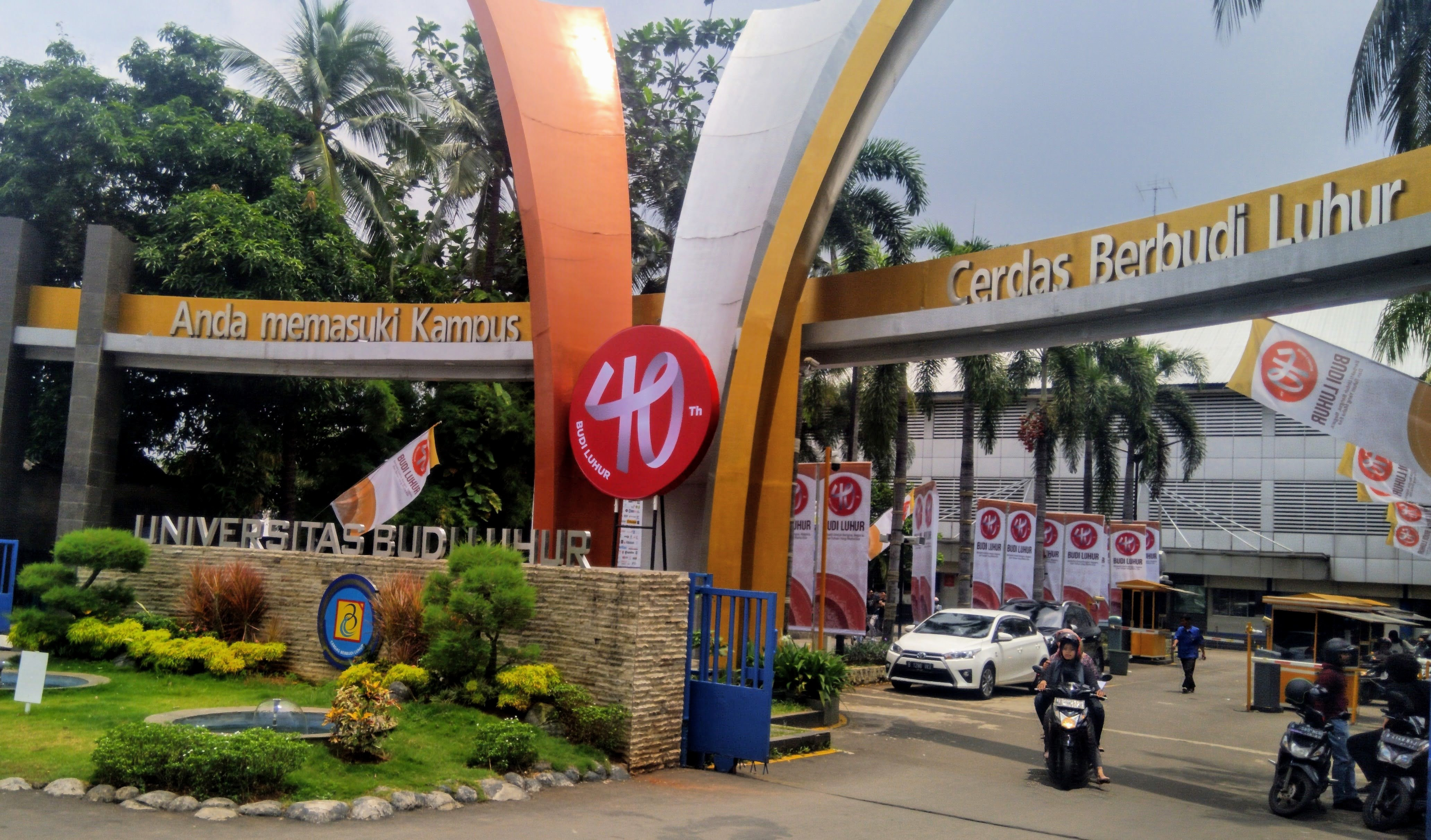
The front gate of Budi Luhur University

- Budi Luhur University
- Darunnajah Islamic Boarding School
- Metro Mall Cipulir
- Swadharma Park
- Bintaro Jaya (Note: Shared with parts in South Tangerang, Banten)
- Pondok Indah

== Transportation ==
=== City Bus Transjakarta ===
- Transjakarta CBD Ciledug - Tegal Mampang
- Transjakarta 1C Pesanggrahan - Blok M
- Transjakarta 1Q Rempoa - Blok M
- Transjakarta 8E Bintaro - Blok M

=== Mayasari Bhakti ===
- Mayasari Bhakti AC73 Kp Rambutan - Ciledug

=== MRT Jakarta Planned ===
- MRT Jakarta (Future Planned) PIK - Kampung Rambutan - Tanjung Priok Along the JORR Toll Road

=== Access Toll Road ===
- Jakarta Outer Ring Road W2 North
- Jakarta-Serpong Toll Road Ulujami - Rawa Buntu
- Jakarta Outer Ring Road Ulujami - Pondok Pinang
