= Kebayoran Lama =

- District
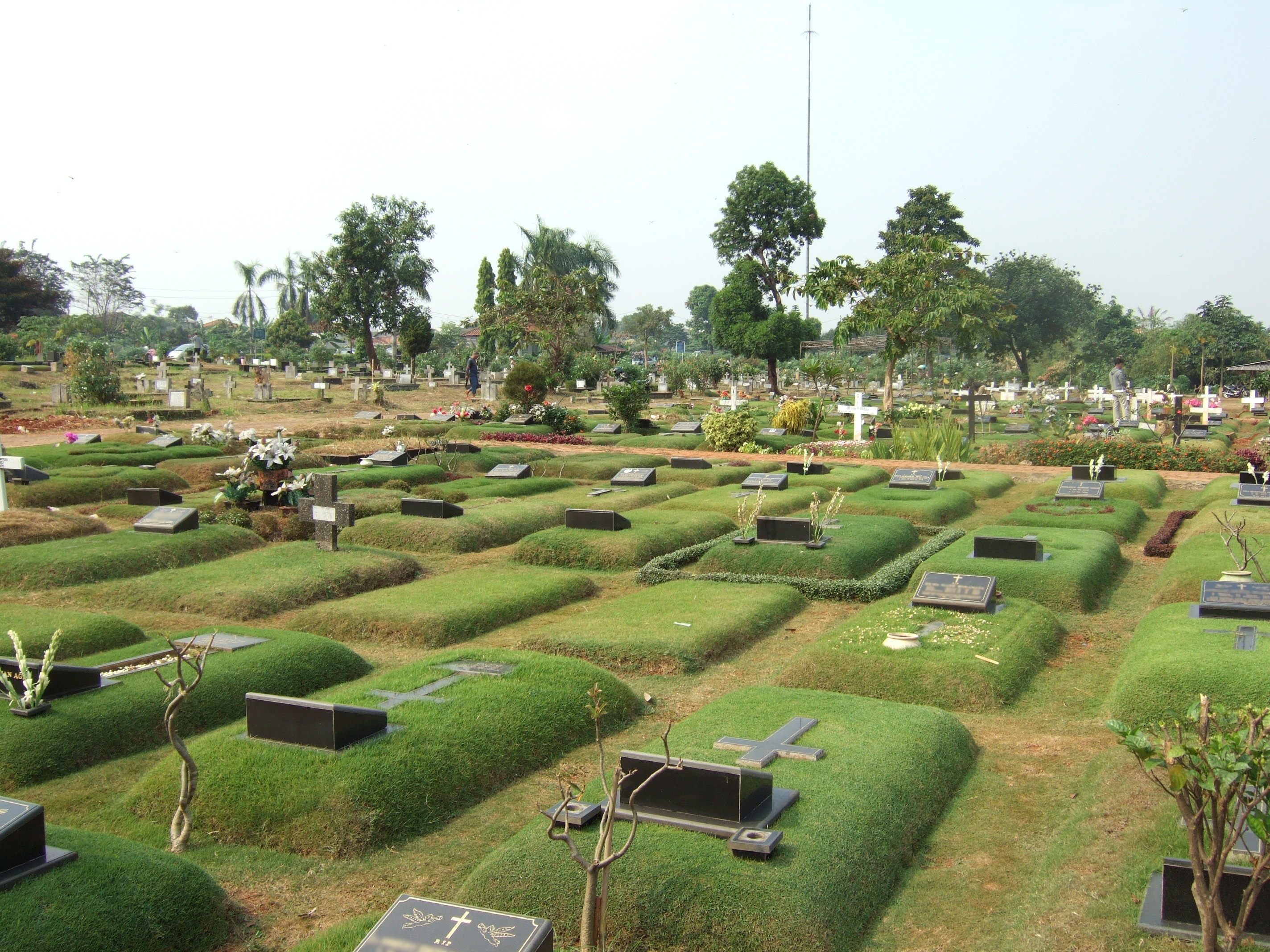
- Tanah Kusir cemetery in Kebayoran Lama
- Interactive map of Kebayoran Lama
- Country: Indonesia
- Province: Jakarta
- Administrative city: South Jakarta

Kebayoran Lama is a district (Indonesian: kecamatan) in the administrative city of South Jakarta, Indonesia. The rough boundaries of Kebayoran Lama are: Kebayoran Lama Road – Palmerah Barat Road to the north, Grogol River to the east, Jakarta Outer Ring Road to the south, and Pesanggrahan River to the west.

Kebayoran Lama contains some green areas of moderate size, some of this area are concentrated within the Tanah Kusir Cemetery, famous for being a burial place of Mohammad Hatta, the first vice president of Indonesia.

Pondok Indah is an upscale residential area located in Kebayoran Lama.

== Toponym ==
Kebayoran Lama consists of the word Kebayoran (Betawi for kabayuran, meaning "stockpiles of bayur wood (Pterospermum javanicum) and Lama (Indonesian for "old"). Several stockpiles of timber (including bayur wood) were built there in earlier time. Bayur wood is known for its strength and resistance to termite attack.

== History ==
During the colonial era, Kebayoran was a kawedanan (an administrative area below a Regency, but above a District), headed by a wedana. The Kawedanan of Kebayoran was part of the regency of Meester Cornelis, whose area also included Ciputat.

Around 1938, an airport was planned in the area by the government of Dutch East Indies, but was cancelled because of World War II. This undeveloped area was later, after the independence period, developed into the district of Kebayoran Baru, while the rest of the area becomes the district of Kebayoran Lama.

In 1990, part of the district of Kebayoran Lama was split to form the district of Pesanggrahan.

== Urban Villages ==
The district of Kebayoran Lama is divided into six kelurahan or urban villages:

Name	Area code
Grogol Utara	12210
Grogol Selatan	1220
Cipulir	12230
Kebayoran Lama Utara	12240
Kebayoran Lama Selatan	12240
Pondok Pinang	12310

== Landmarks ==
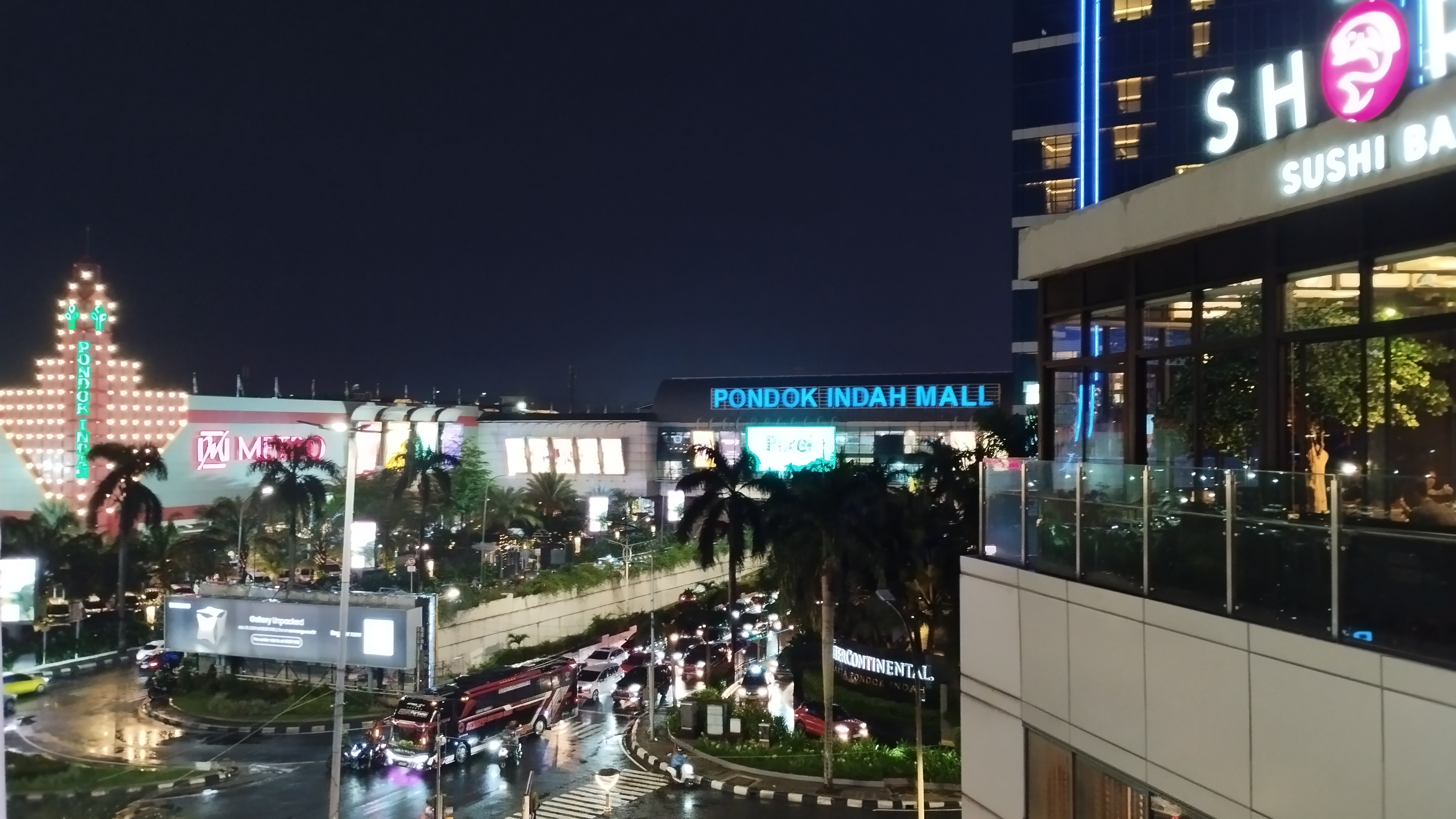
Pondok Indah Mall

- Kebayoran Lama Market
- Kebayoran Lama Station
- Pondok Indah Golf and Country Club
- Pondok Indah Grand Mosque
- Pondok Indah Mall
- Tanah Kusir Cemetery
- Gandaria City

== Transport ==
=== City Bus Transjakarta ===
- Transjakarta Koridor Lebak Bulus - Pasar Baru
- Transjakarta Koridor Ciledug - Tegal Mampang

=== KRL Commuter Line ===
- Commuter Line Rangkasbitung Rangkasbitung Line At Is Kebayoran Station

=== MRT Jakarta ===
- MRT Jakarta Lebak Bulus - Bundaran HI (At Is Lebak Bulus Station)
- MRT Jakarta (Future Planned) PIK - Kp Rambutan - Tj Priok Along JORR Toll Road

=== LRT Jakarta (Future Development) ===
- LRT Jakarta Pulogebang - Hasyim Ashari
