= Budi Luhur University =

Private university in Indonesia

Coordinates: 6.236244°S 106.747364°E

- Universitas Budi Luhur
- Former names: Akademi Ilmu Komputer (AIK)
- Motto: Cerdas Berbudi Luhur
- Motto in English: Intelligent Virtuous
- Type: Private
- Established: 1 April 1979
- Founders: Dr. Djaetun HS.
- Rector: Ir. Wendi Usino, MM., M.Sc., Ph.D.
- Location: Jakarta
- Colours: Dark Blue
- Sporting affiliations: LIMA
- Mascot: Knight
- Website: https://www.budiluhur.ac.id/

Budi Luhur University (Indonesian: Universitas Budi Luhur) is a private university in Jakarta, Indonesia. Founded on 1 April 1979 by Dr. Djaetun HS.. This university is a part of Budi Luhur Cakti Education Foundation (Yayasan Pendidikan Budi Luhur Cakti).

== History ==
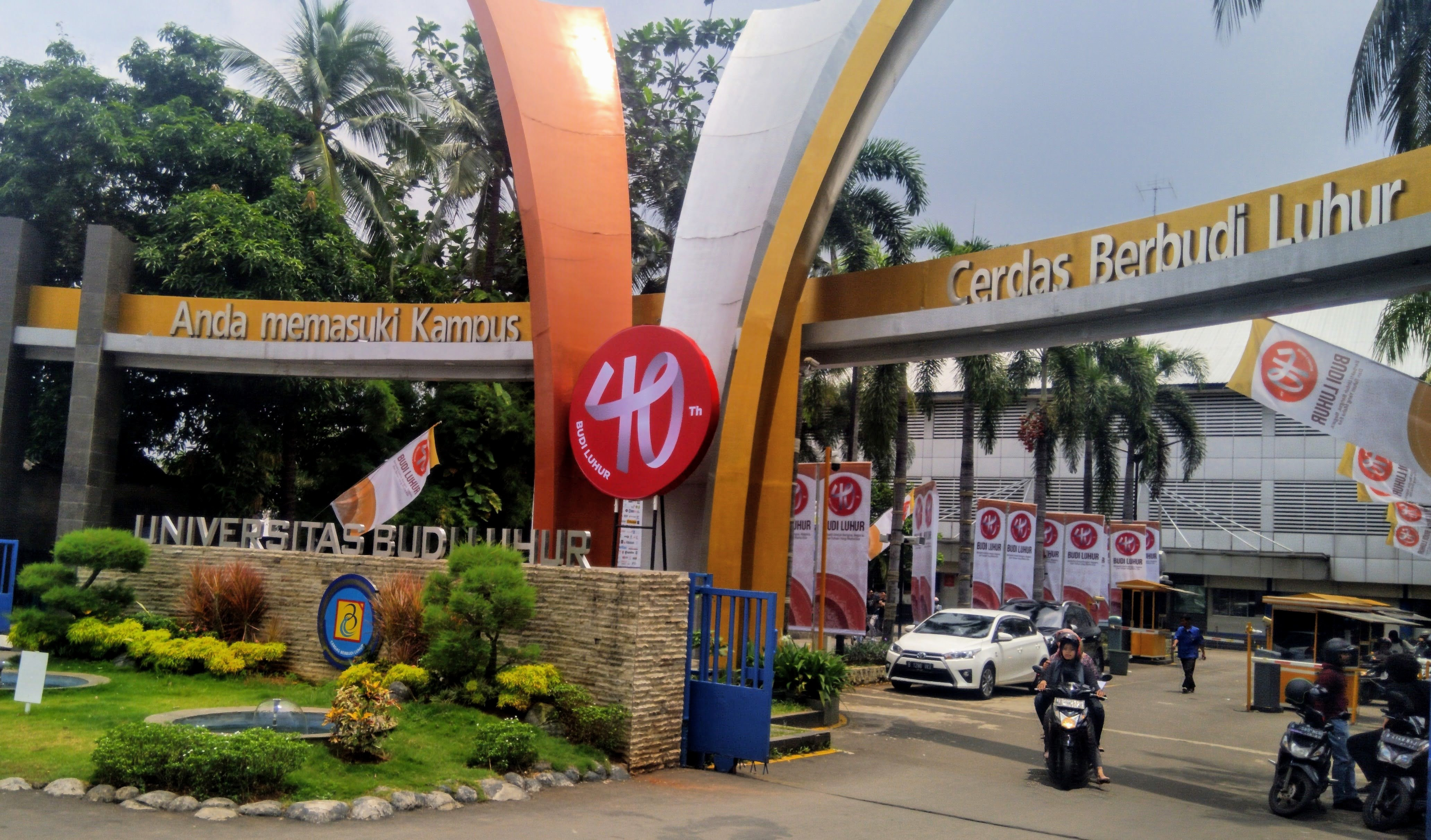
Front gate of Budi Luhur University, with unit 1 and 2 building behind it

The founding of Budi Luhur University was started by the foundation on 1 April 1979. Started as Computer Science Academy (Akademi Ilmu Komputer) in 1979. Computer Science Academy was regarded as one of the earliest university specialised in computer science in Indonesia.

Budi Luhur University (UBL) was formed from the amalgamation of Computer and Informatics Management High School, Economic Science High School, Engineering High School, and Political and Social Science High School of Budi Luhur on 7 June 2002.

Budi Luhur University mandated its students to participate on Community Service Programme (KKN) since 2019.

Budi Luhur University in association with Sepuluh November Institute of Technology developing BLITS electric rally raid car which already toured across Indonesia and will participate in Dakar Rally in the future.

== Faculties ==
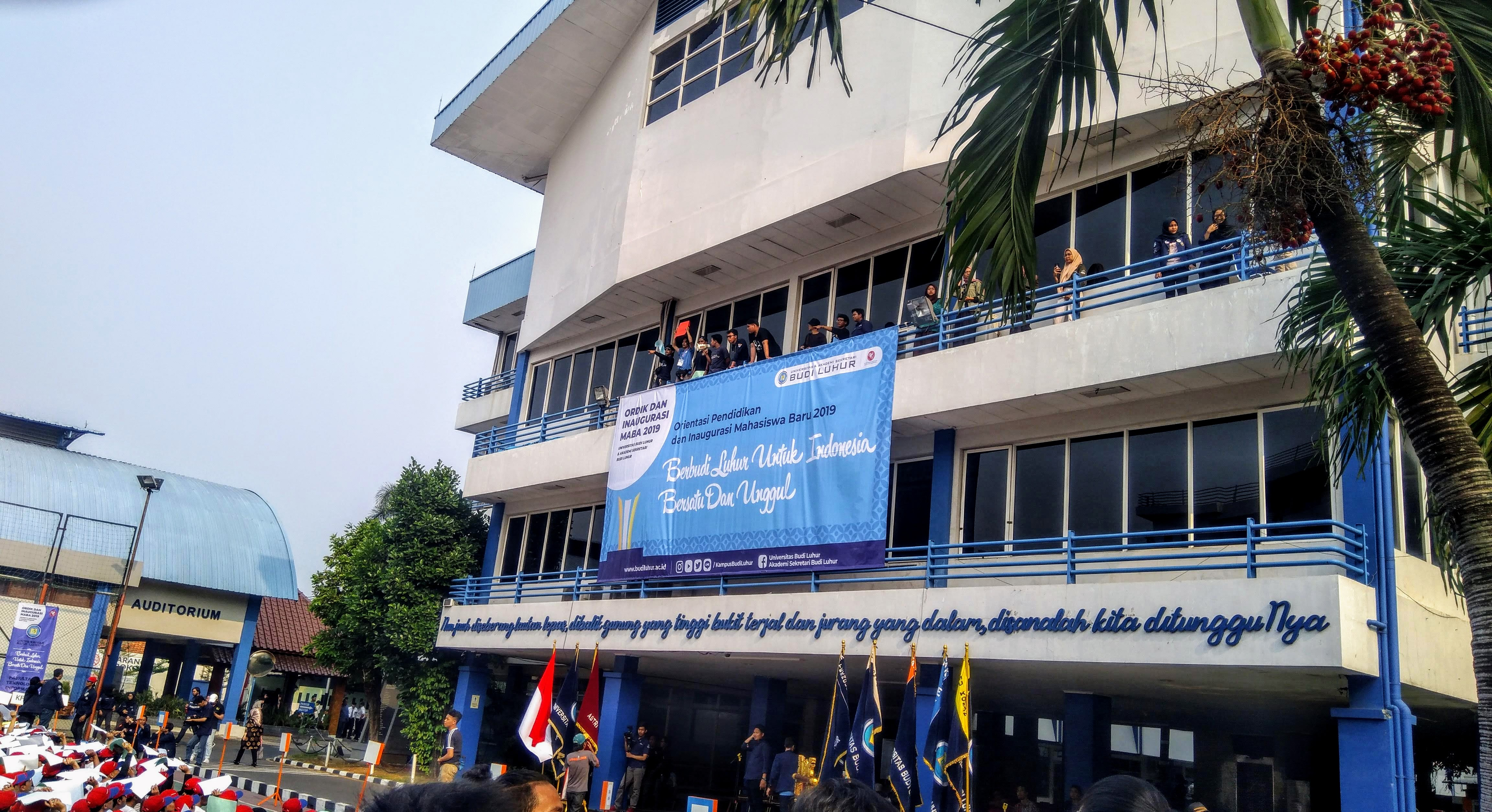
Unit 3-6 building

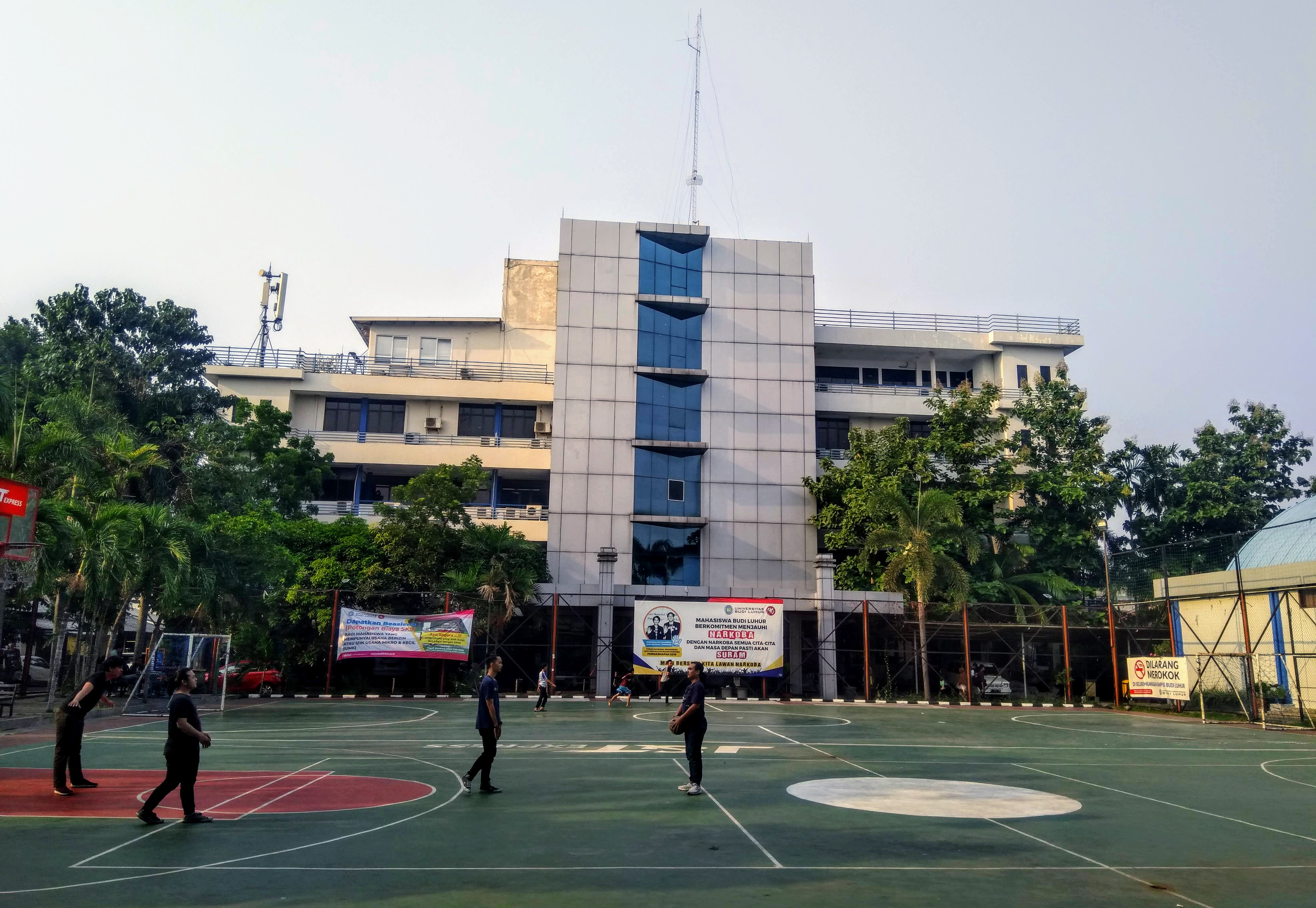
Unit 7 building and pitch

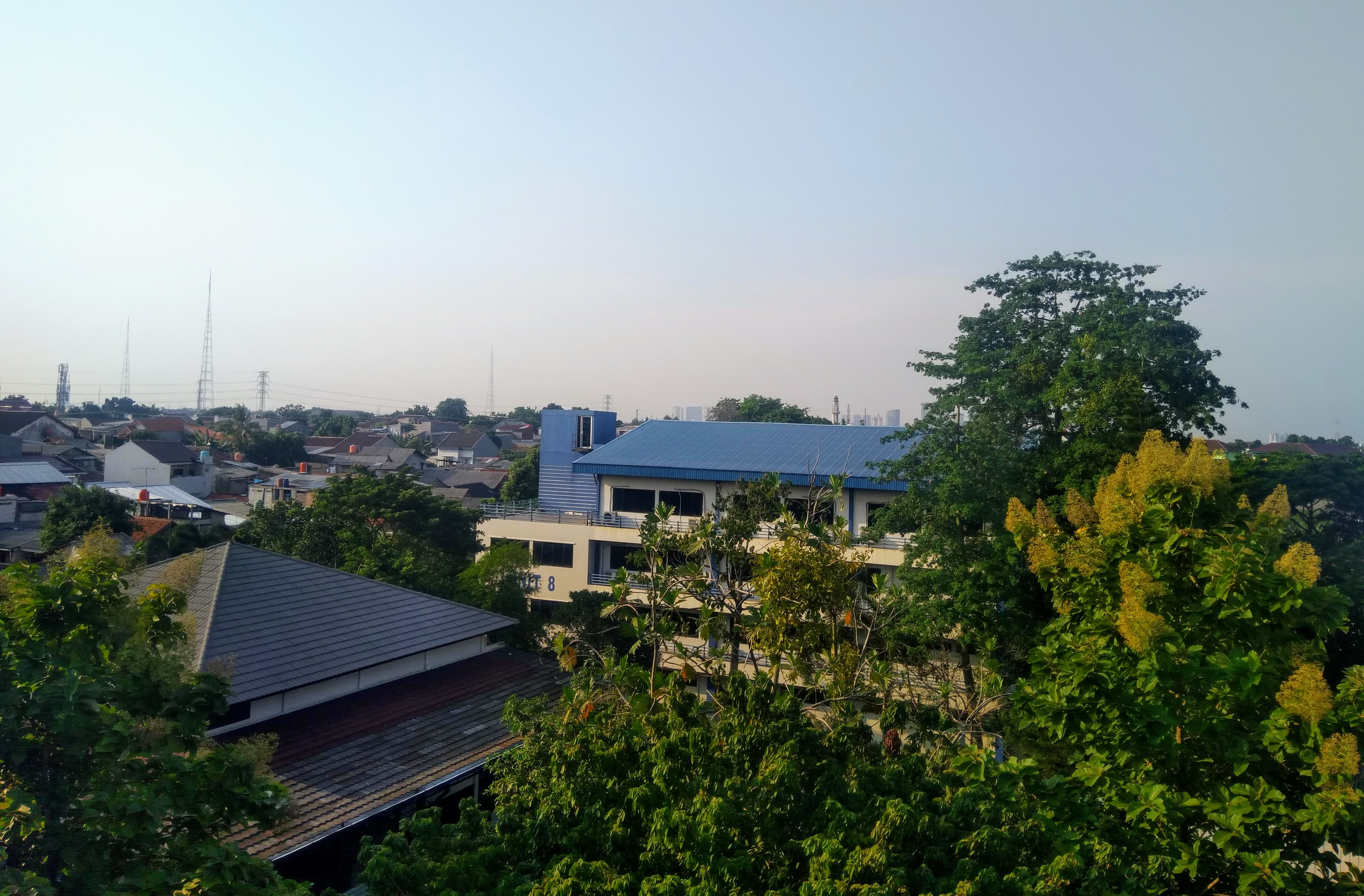
Unit 8 building

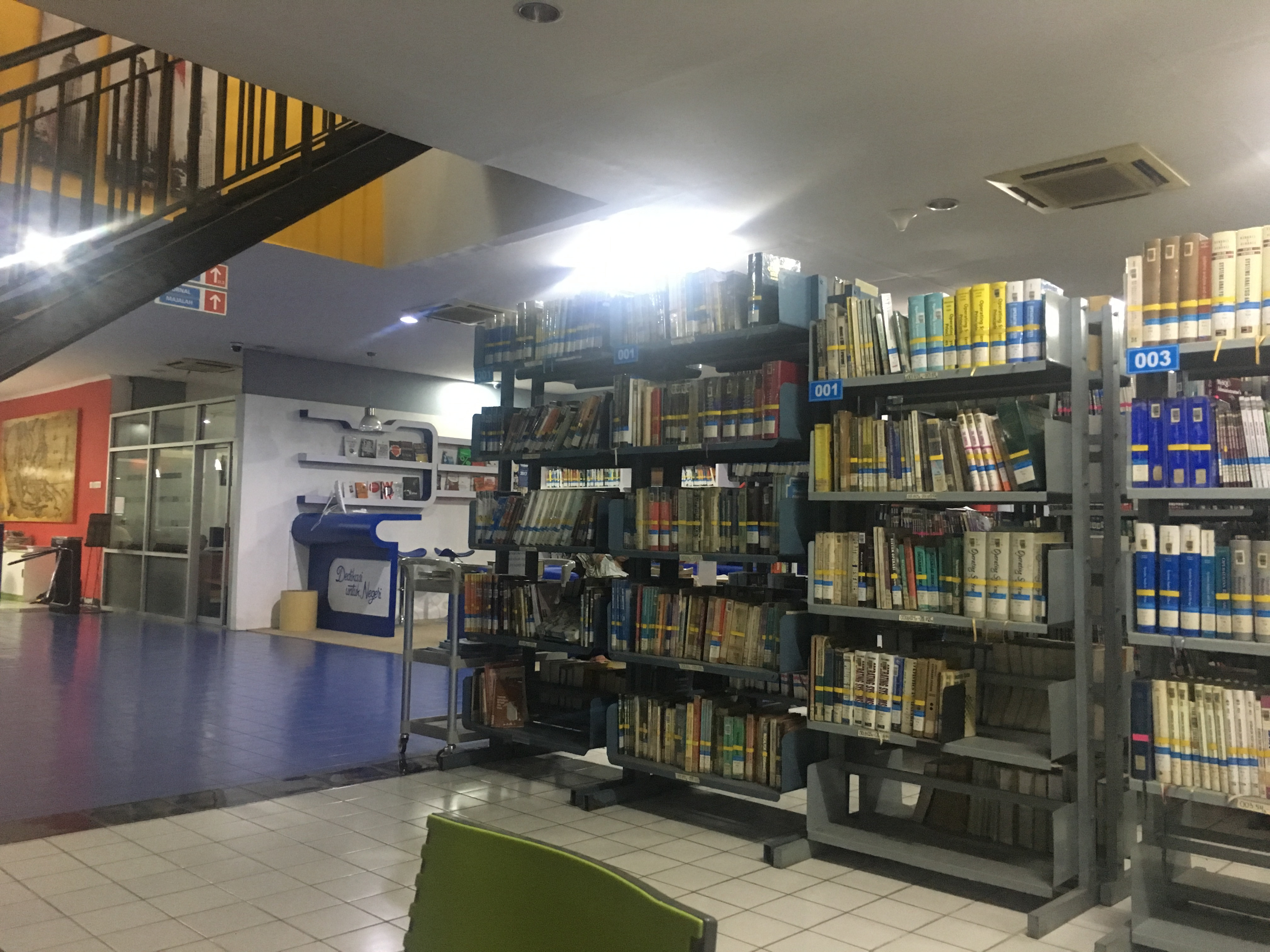
Library of Budi Luhur University

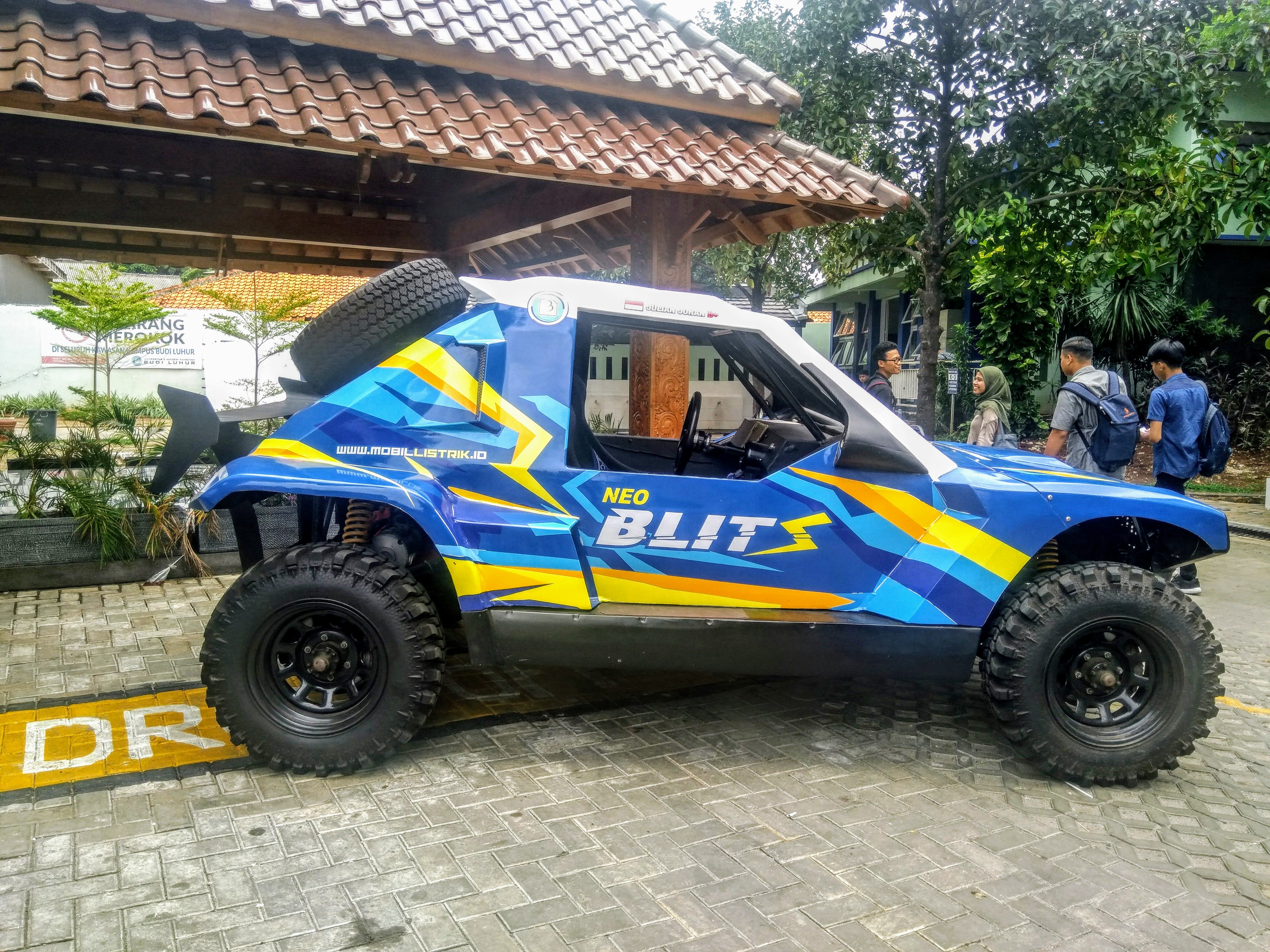
NEO BLITS electric rally raid car

Budi Luhur University has five faculties and an academy with bachelor's degree (S1) and 3-year diploma degree (D3) and accredited by National Accreditation Body of High School (BAN PT). Budi Luhur University also has post-graduate programme for master's degree (S2).

=== Faculty of Information and Technology (FTI) ===
FTI has three specialisations for bachelor's degree and two specialisations for 3-year diploma.

Bachelor's degree

- Computer Science
- Information Systems
- Computer Systems

3-year diploma

- Informatics Management
- Computerisation of Accountancy

Post-graduate programme (master's degree)

- Master of Computer Science

=== Faculty of Communication and Creative Design (FKDK) ===
FKDK has two specialisations for bachelor's degree.

- Communication Science
- Visual Communication Design

Post-graduate programme (master's degree)

- Master of Communication Science

=== Faculty of Economics and Business (FEB) ===
FEB has two specialisations for bachelor's degree.

- Marketing
- Accountancy

The formerly separate Academy of Secretary (ASTRI) was later merged into FEB, with a specialisation for 3-year diploma.

- Secretary

Post-graduate programmes (master's degree)

- Master of Accountancy
- Master of Management

=== Faculty of Engineering (FT) ===
FT has two specialisations for bachelor's degree.

- Architecture
- Electrical Engineering

=== Faculty of Social and Global Studies (FISSIG) ===
FISSIG has two specialisations for bachelor's degree.

- International Relations
- Criminology

== Special Programmes ==
- International Programmes with partner universities
- Executive Class
- Jakarta Broadcasting School (JBS)
- Budi Luhur Learning Centre (BLLC)
