= Pondok Indah Mall =

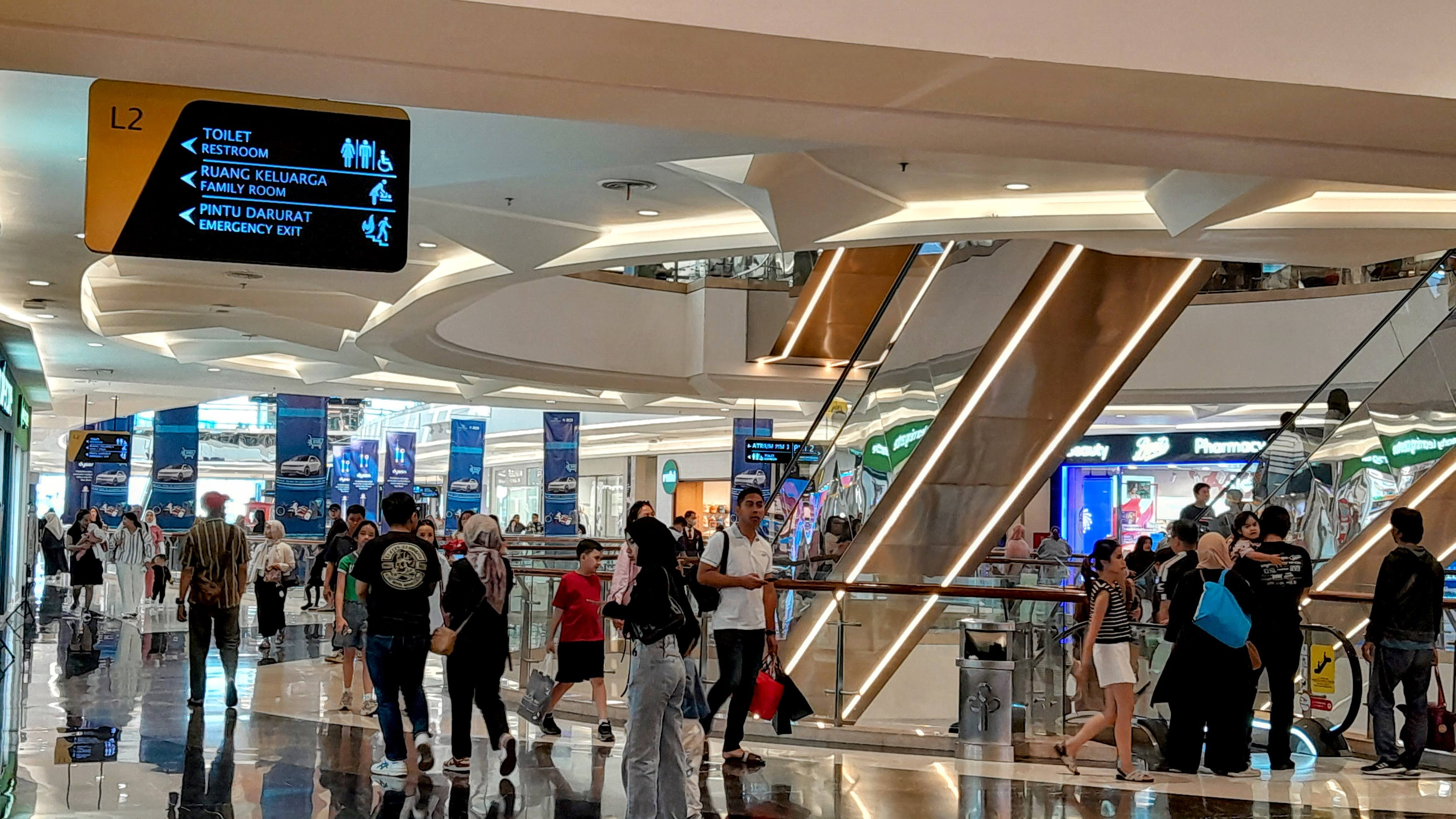
- Inside view of Pondok Indah Mall
- Location: South Jakarta, Indonesia
- Coordinates: 6°15′56.55″S 106°47′3.47″E
- Address: Jalan Metro Pondok Indah Kav. IV/TA
- Opened: 1991 (PIM 1); 2005 (PIM 2 & South-North Skywalk); 2013 (Street Gallery); 2021 (PIM 3); 2026 (PIM 5)
- Developer: PT Metropolitan Kentjana Tbk (IDX: MKPI)
- Manager: PT Metropolitan Kentjana Tbk
- Owner: PT Metropolitan Kentjana Tbk (Murdaya family)
- Num. of stores: approximately 400
- Floors: 3 (PIM 1); 5 (PIM 2); 2 (North and South Skywalk); 3 (Street Gallery); 5 (PIM 3); 1 (PIM 5)
- Public transit: Pondok Indah
- Website: www.pondokindahmall.co.id

Pondok Indah Mall (Indonesian: Mal Pondok Indah), abbreviated as PIM, is a large shopping mall complex located in the Pondok Indah suburb of South Jakarta, Indonesia. In January 2017, it was recognised by Forbes as one of the top five shopping malls in Jakarta. The Pondok Indah Mall complex comprises three large main buildings, the older 3-storey PIM 1 and the 5-storey PIM 2, and the newest building, the 4-storey PIM 3. PIM 1 and 2 are interconnected via two elevated multi-storey pedestrian walkways (North Skywalk and South Skywalk), which are also tenanted by specialty shops. PIM 3, which was officially opened in 2021, is interconnected to the other two buildings by a walkway located near the north skywalk, in the PIM 2 building. PIM 1 also includes an extension named Street Gallery.

Each three main buildings (PIM 1, 2, and 3) have different tractions: PIM 1 provides a complete shopping concept with a supermarket on the ground floor and a vast food court, PIM 2 is more focused on upper-class aficionados with numbers of luxurious fashion and lifestyle brands, and PIM 3 becomes the balancer of the concept of both PIM 1 and 2. PIM 1 and 2 each house a cinema complex, both operated by Cinema XXI. There is also an open-air water theme park located adjacent to PIM 1, right behind Street Gallery.

The Pondok Indah Mall complex has been further developed into a mixed-use development termed as the 'Pondok Indah City Center', which includes apartment towers, office towers, and the InterContinental Jakarta Pondok Indah Hotel & Residences which is adjoined with PIM 2 and comprises approximately 300 hotel rooms and 180 serviced residences.

== Architecture ==
The architectural style is that of an understated elegant conventional mall, with flooring continually updated until its present condition of polished Indonesian marble and granite. The architecture roughly imitated Dutch colonial large-scale warehouses with extensive steel-truss interpretation of Dutch structural timberwork for an innovative illuminating central skylight (double-glazed for minimizing heat transfer) and featured three airy floors of shopping with a narrow open-floor gallery (made safe via decorative fencing). The exterior featured aluminium cladding for minimal maintenance in the harsh tropical climate.

=== Pondok Indah Mall 1 ===
PIM 1 was completed in 1991. Originally, the site was a mixture of open fields, kampong, middle-class dwellings, and traditional warungs and eateries. Metro Department Store opened its first store at PIM 1, alongside fellow anchor tenants Hero Supermarket, Muji, and Cinema XXI. It also houses a Uniqlo store, along with PIM 3.

==== Street Gallery ====
PIM 1's new extension, Street Gallery opened in 2013. It is located south of the PIM1 side. It mainly consists of food and beverage tenants. It is connected to PIM 1 by a passage in the South Skywalk.

=== Pondok Indah Mall 2 ===
PIM 2 was first advertised as an ambitious huge amalgamation of residential and hotel-apartment tower complexes (one tower for each), office space, and commercial hub. However, due to the 1997 Asian financial crisis, funds were unavailable to proceed. After a change of ownership, the expansion was finally realized in 2004 with the opening of Mall 2. At PIM2, Sogo unveiled its latest supermarket format, dubbed "Sogo Foodhall" in 2004. In 2023, Don Don Donki opened its fourth store here.

=== Pondok Indah Mall 3 ===
PIM 3 was developed in the second half of 2016, after the success of closing the roof of Pondok Indah Residences. It was designed with a leasable area of over 55,000 square metres, and was officially opened on 8 April 2021. A key architectural feature is the giant balcony with a glass floor that shows the bottom two floors called Atmost-Fear. Seibu, Ranch Market, and Uniqlo are the anchor tenants. PIM 3 has a convention hall called the "City Hall" on the top floor, which becomes the venue of the Jakarta Fashion Week since 2022. Above the connection bridge between PIM 3 and 2, there is an open-air public space and a small flower garden called "Love on Top" (LoT).

== Gallery ==
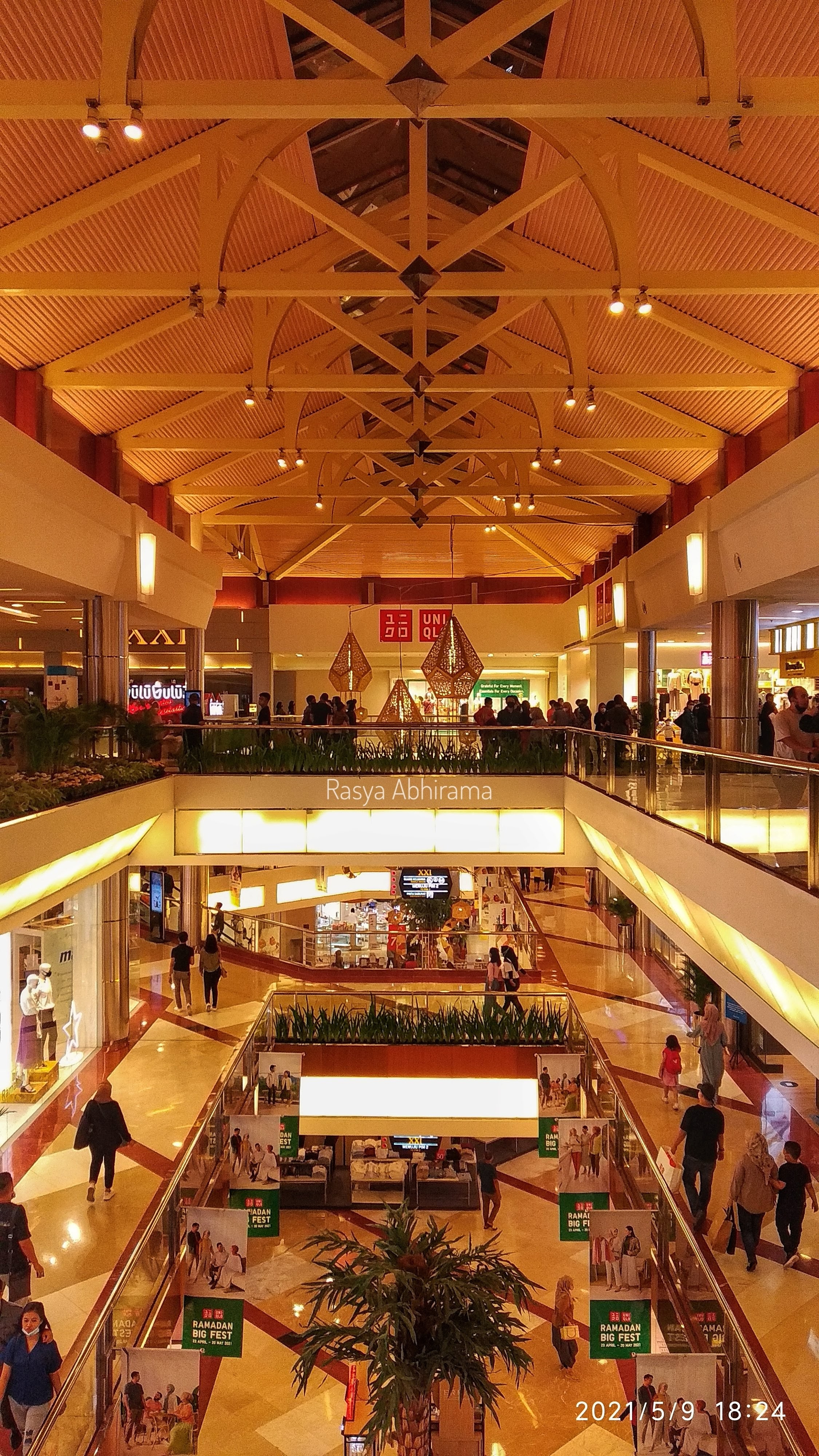
Inner view from the top floor of PIM 1

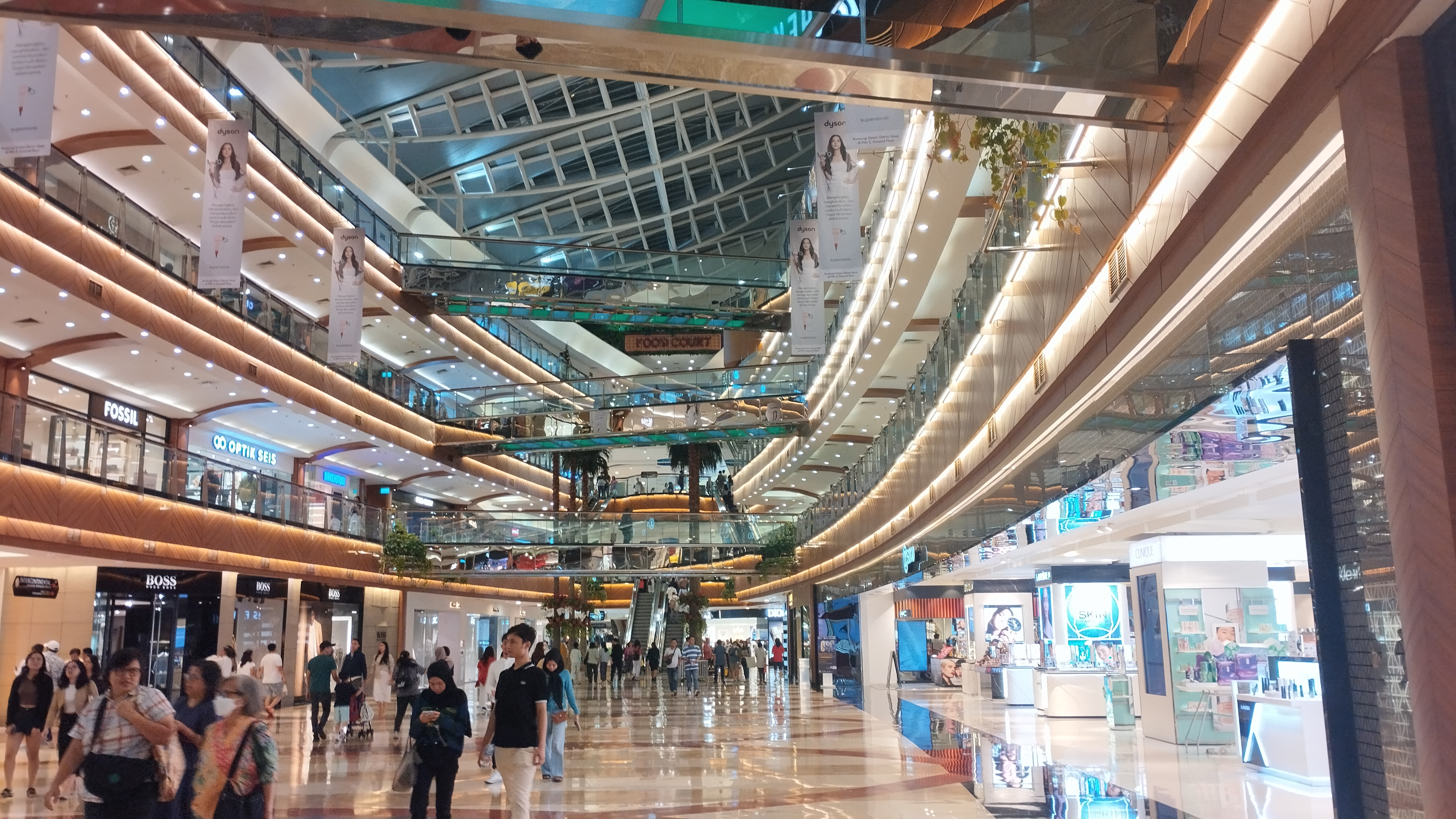
Inner view of PIM 2

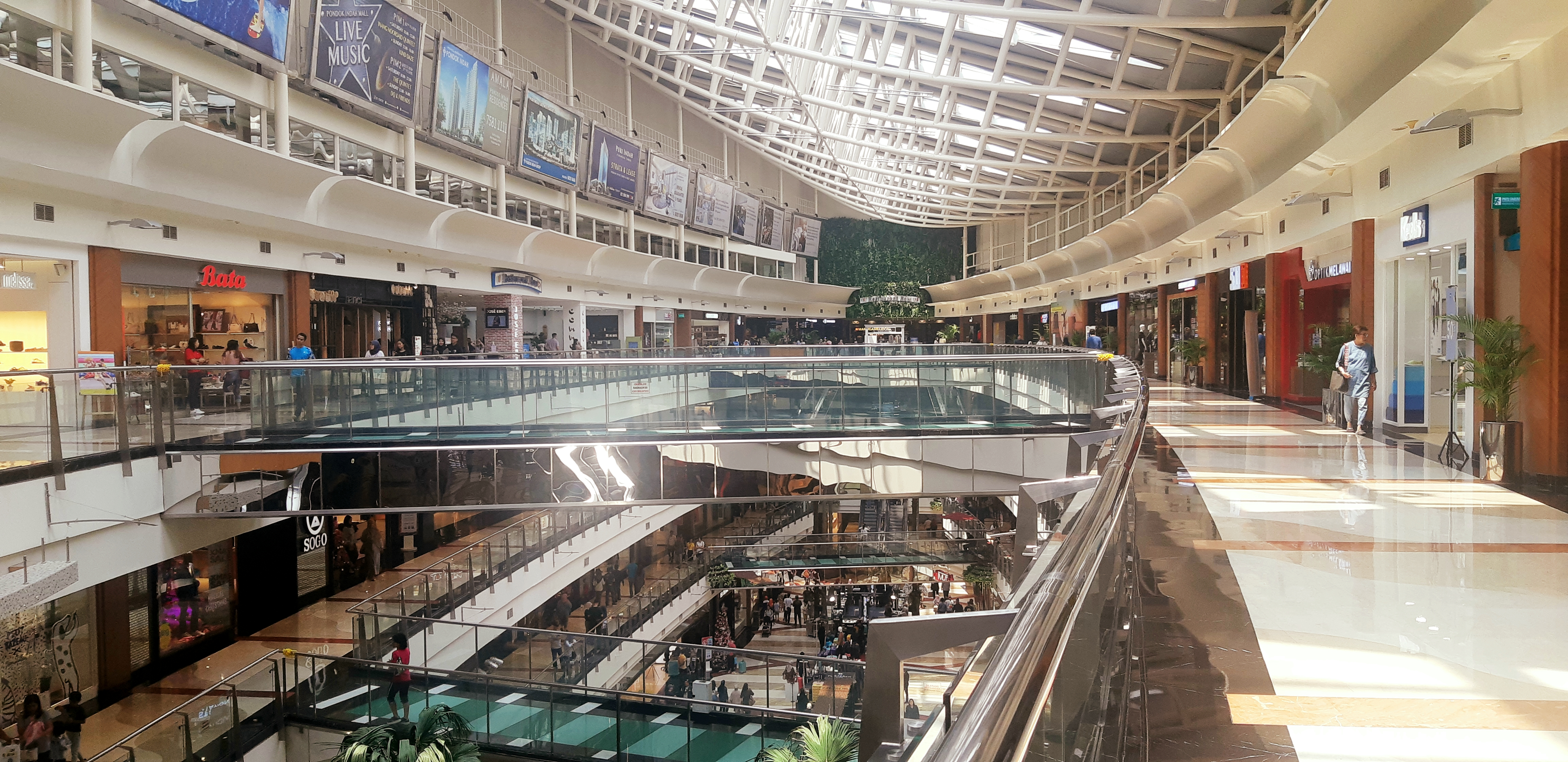
The third floor of PIM 2

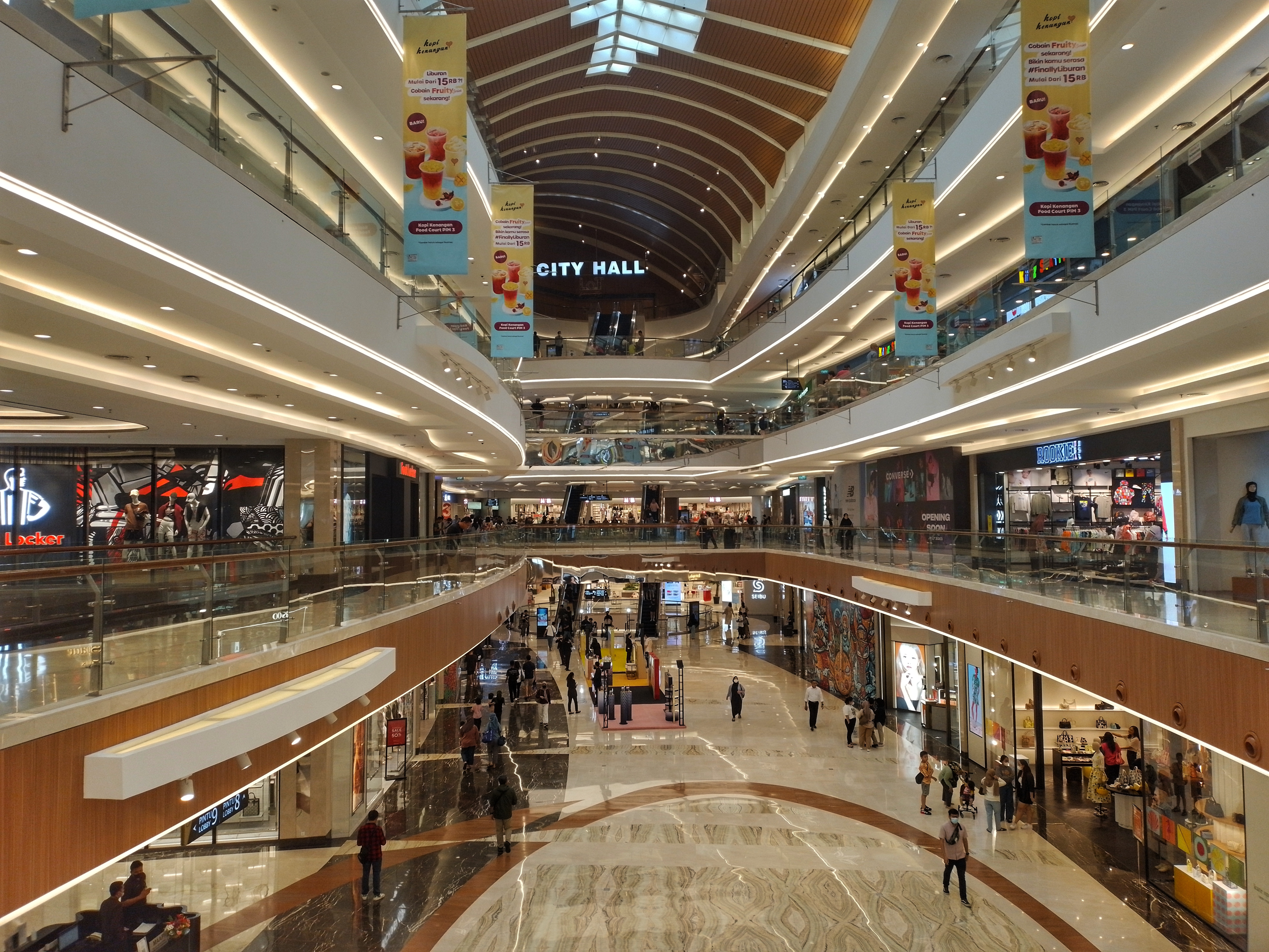
Inner view of PIM 3

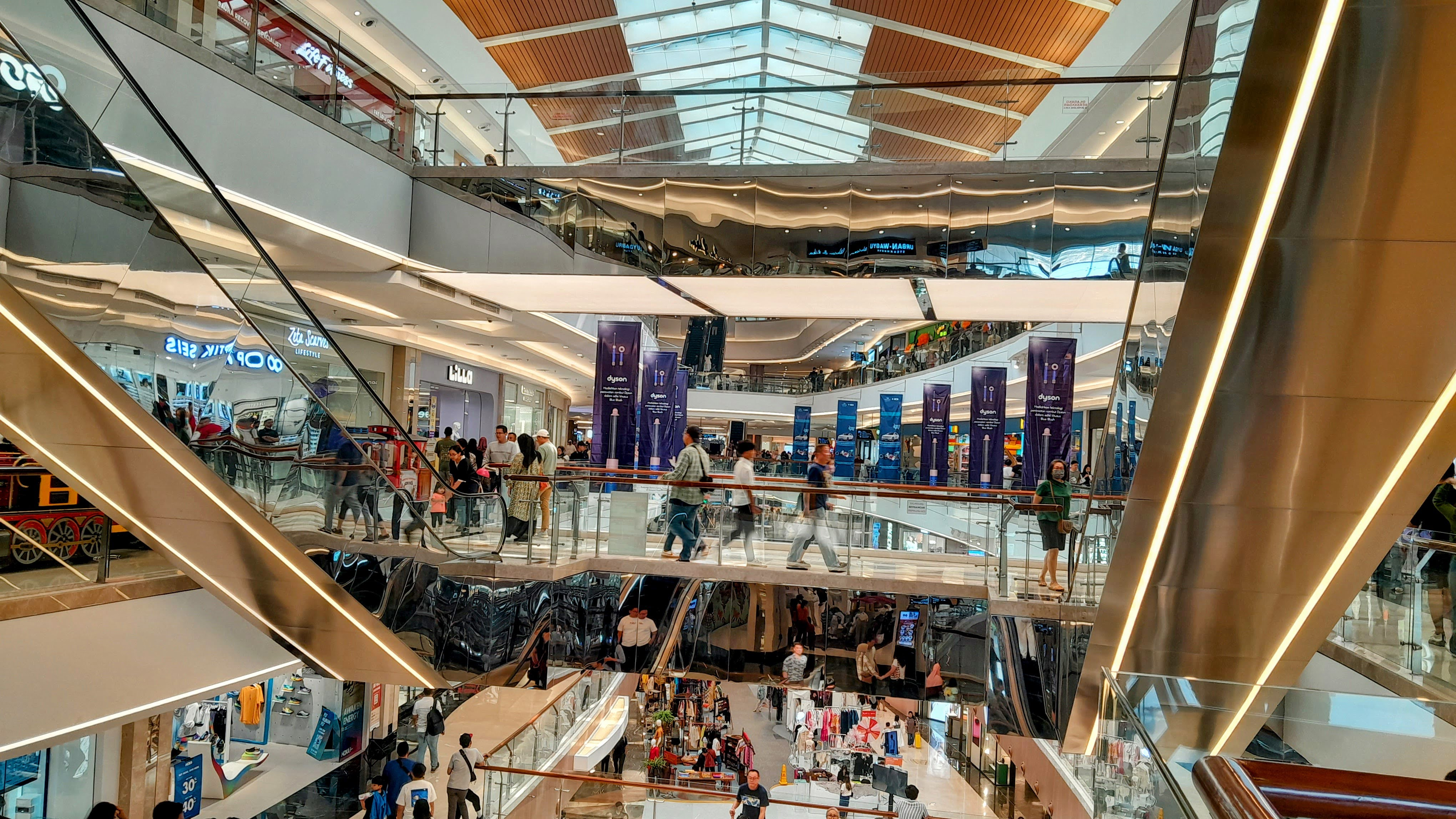
Inner view of PIM 3

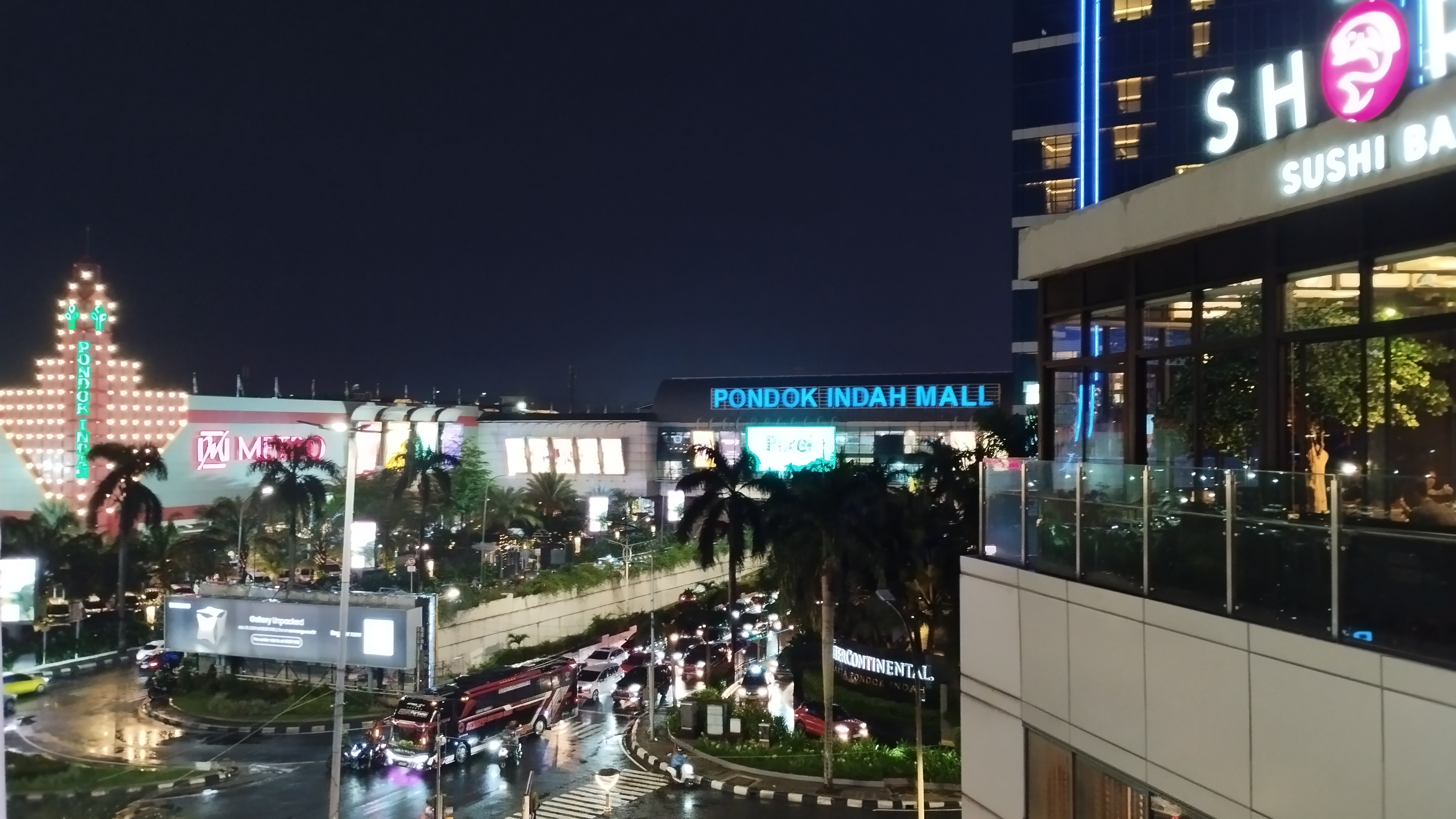
PIM 1 and the north skywalk at night

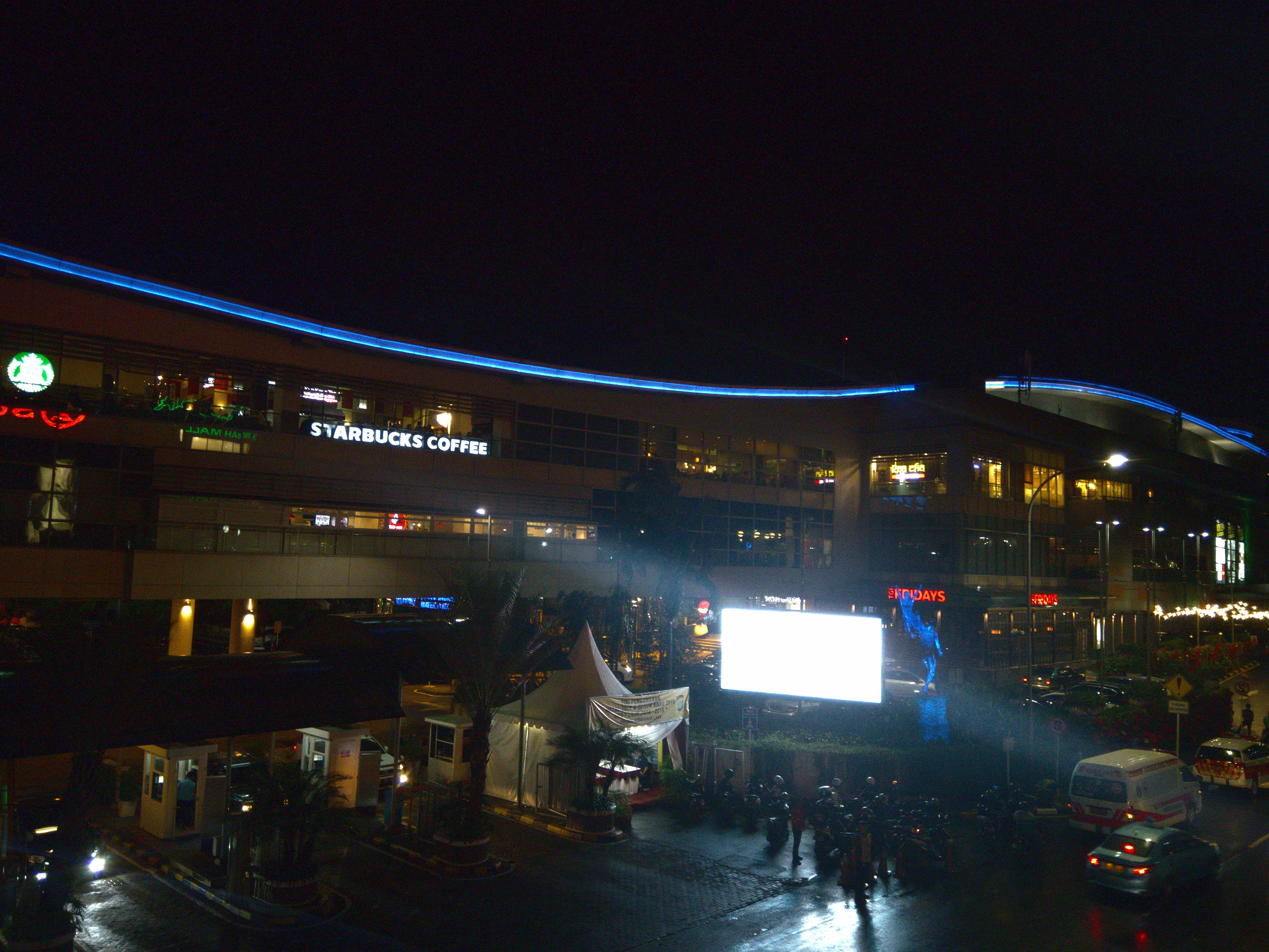
PIM Street Gallery at night

== See also ==
- Pondok Indah
- List of shopping malls in Indonesia
  - List of shopping malls in Jakarta
