= Swiss-Belhotel International =

International hospitality company

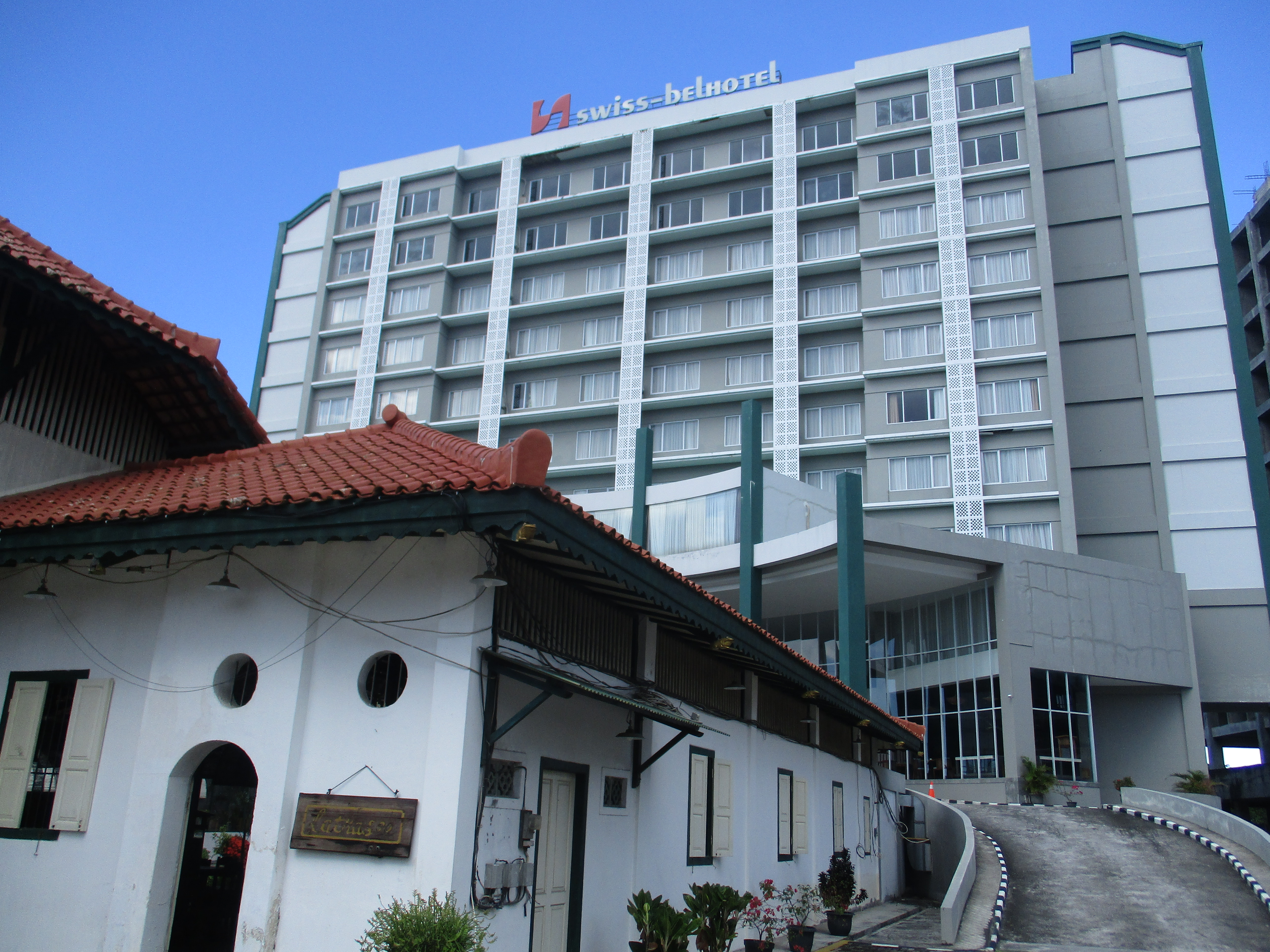
- Swiss-Belhotel in Pangkalpinang, Indonesia
- Type: Private
- Industry: Hospitality
- Founded: 1987
- Headquarters: Hong Kong
- Website: www.swiss-belhotel.com

Swiss-Belhotel International is an international hospitality company founded in 1987 by Peter Gautschi and headquartered in Hong Kong.

== Brands ==
As of 2024, the company operates 125 hotels in 21 countries under overall 16 brands:

- Zest - Zest, Zest OK, Zest Plus
- Budget - Swiss-Belinn, Swiss-Belcourt, Swiss-Belexpress
- Midscale/Upscale - Swiss-Belhotel, Swiss-Belresort, Swiss-Belvillas, Swiss-Belresidences
- Upper Upscale - Grand Swiss-Belhotel, Grand Swiss-Belresort, Swiss-Belboutique, Swiss-Belsuites
- Luxury - Māua, Bohemia

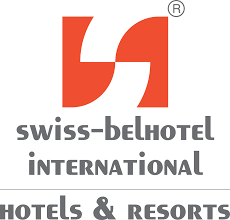
Alternative logo
