= History of Southeast Asia =

Southeast Asia

The history of Southeast Asia covers the people of Southeast Asia from prehistory to the present in two distinct sub-regions: Mainland Southeast Asia (or Indochina) and Maritime Southeast Asia (or Insular Southeast Asia). Mainland Southeast Asia comprises Cambodia, Laos, Myanmar (or Burma), Peninsular Malaysia, Thailand and Vietnam whereas Maritime Southeast Asia comprises Brunei, Cocos (Keeling) Islands, Christmas Island, East Malaysia, East Timor, Indonesia, the Philippines, and Singapore.

The earliest Homo sapiens presence in Mainland Southeast Asia can be traced back to 70,000 years ago and to at least 50,000 years ago in Maritime Southeast Asia. Since 25,000 years ago, East Asian-related (basal East Asian) groups expanded southwards into Maritime Southeast Asia from Mainland Southeast Asia. As early as 10,000 years ago, Hoabinhian settlers from Mainland Southeast Asia had developed a tradition and culture of distinct artefact and tool production. During the Neolithic, Austroasiatic peoples populated Mainland Southeast Asia via land routes, and sea-borne Austronesian immigrants preferably settled in Maritime Southeast Asia. The earliest agricultural societies that cultivated millet and wet-rice emerged around 1700 BCE in the lowlands and river floodplains of Southeast Asia.

The Phung Nguyen culture (modern northern Vietnam) and the Ban Chiang site (modern Thailand) account for the earliest use of copper by around 2,000 BCE, followed by the Dong Son culture, which by around 500 BCE had developed a highly sophisticated industry of bronze production and processing. Around the same time, the first Agrarian Kingdoms emerged where territory was abundant and favourable, such as Funan at the lower Mekong and Van Lang in the Red River Delta. Smaller and insular principalities increasingly engaged in and contributed to the rapidly expanding sea trade.

The wide topographical diversity of Southeast Asia has greatly influenced its history. For instance, Mainland Southeast Asia with its continuous but rugged and difficult terrain provided the basis for the early Cham, Khmer, and Mon civilisations. The sub-region's extensive coastline and major systems of the Irrawaddy, Salween, Chao Phraya, Mekong, and Red Rivers have directed socio-cultural and economic activities towards the Indian Ocean and South China Sea.

In Maritime Southeast Asia, apart from exceptions such as Borneo and Sumatra, the patchwork of recurring land-sea patterns on widely dispersed islands and archipelagos admitted moderately sized thalassocratic states indifferent to territorial ambitions, where growth and prosperity were associated with sea trade. Since around 100 BCE, Maritime Southeast Asia has occupied a central position at the crossroads of the Indian Ocean and the South China Sea trading routes, immensely stimulating its economy and influencing its culture and society. Most local trading polities selectively adopted Indian Hindu elements of statecraft, religion, culture and administration during the early centuries of the common era, which marked the beginning of recorded history in the area and the continuation of a characteristic cultural development. Chinese culture diffused into the region more indirectly and sporadically, as trade was mostly based on land routes like the Silk Road. Long periods of Chinese isolationism and political relations that were confined to ritualistic tribute procedures prevented deep acculturation.

Buddhism, particularly in Mainland Southeast Asia, began to affect political structures beginning in the 8th to 9th centuries CE. Islamic ideas arrived in insular Southeast Asia as early as the 8th century, and the first Muslim societies in the area emerged by the 13th century. The era of European colonialism, early modernity, and the Cold War era revealed the reality of limited political significance for the various Southeast Asian polities. Post-World War II national survival and progress required a modern state and a strong national identity. Most modern Southeast Asian countries enjoy a historically unprecedented degree of political freedom and self-determination and have embraced the practical concept of intergovernmental co-operation within the Association of Southeast Asian Nations (ASEAN).

== Name ==
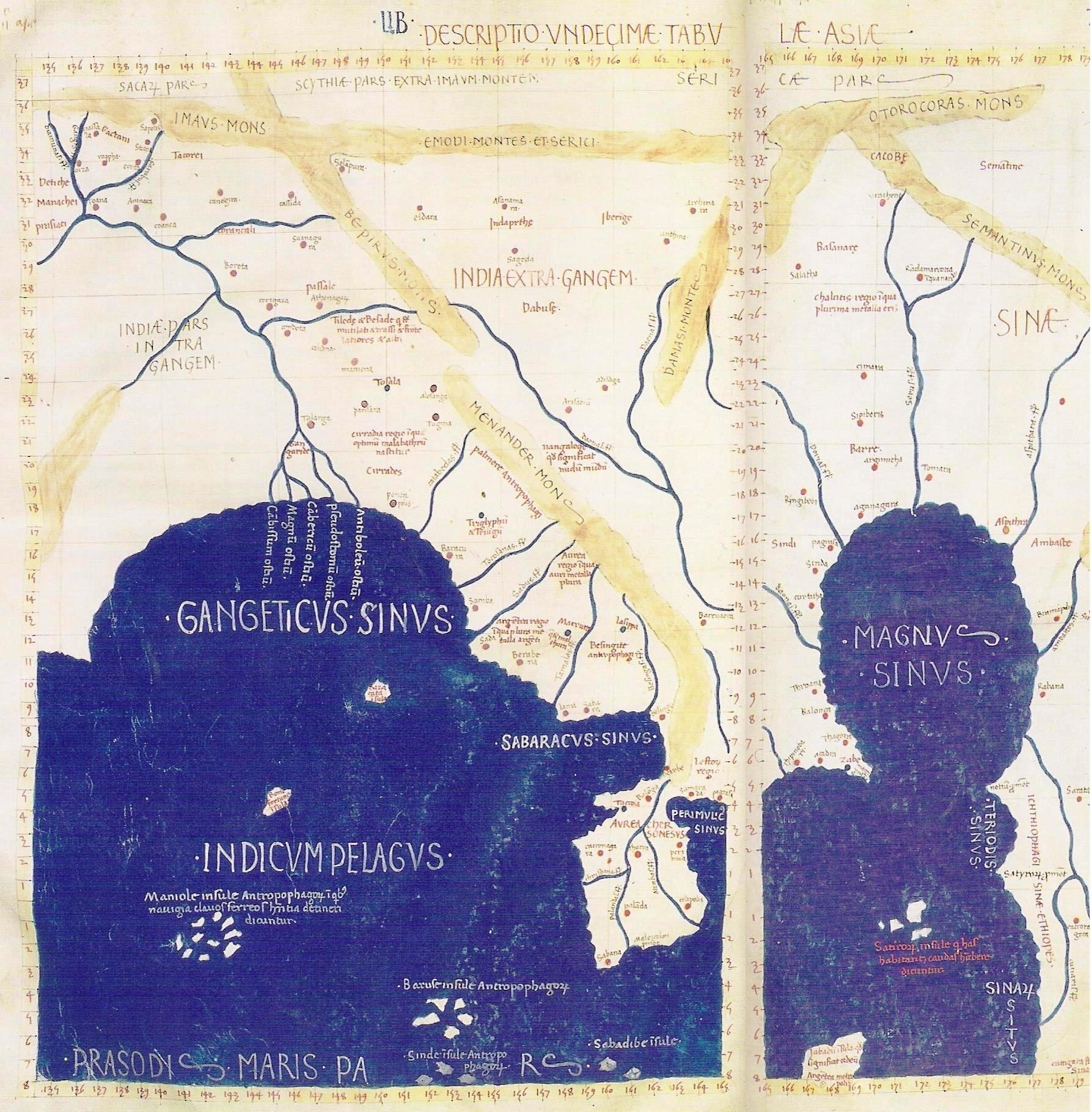
Detail of Asia in Ptolemy's world map. Gulf of the Ganges left, Southeast Asian peninsula in the centre written as Avrea Chersonesvs, China Sea right, with "Sinae" (China)

Though there are numerous ancient historic Asian designations for Southeast Asia, none are geographically consistent with each other. Names referring to Southeast Asia include Suvarnabhumi or Sovannah Phoum (Golden Land) and Suvarnadvipa (Golden Islands) in Indian tradition, the Lands below the Winds in Arabia and Persia, Nanyang (Chinese: 南洋; lit. 'South Ocean') in China and Nan'yō (南洋) in Japan. A 2nd-century world map created by Ptolemy of Alexandria names the Malay Peninsula as Chersonesus Aurea (lit. 'Golden Peninsula').

The term "Southeast Asia" was first used in 1839 by American pastor Howard Malcolm in his book Travels in South-Eastern Asia. Malcolm only included the Mainland section and excluded the Maritime section in his definition of Southeast Asia. The term was officially used to designate the area of operation (the South East Asia Command, SEAC) for Anglo-American forces in the Pacific Theater of World War II from 1941 to 1945.

== Prehistory ==
=== Paleolithic ===
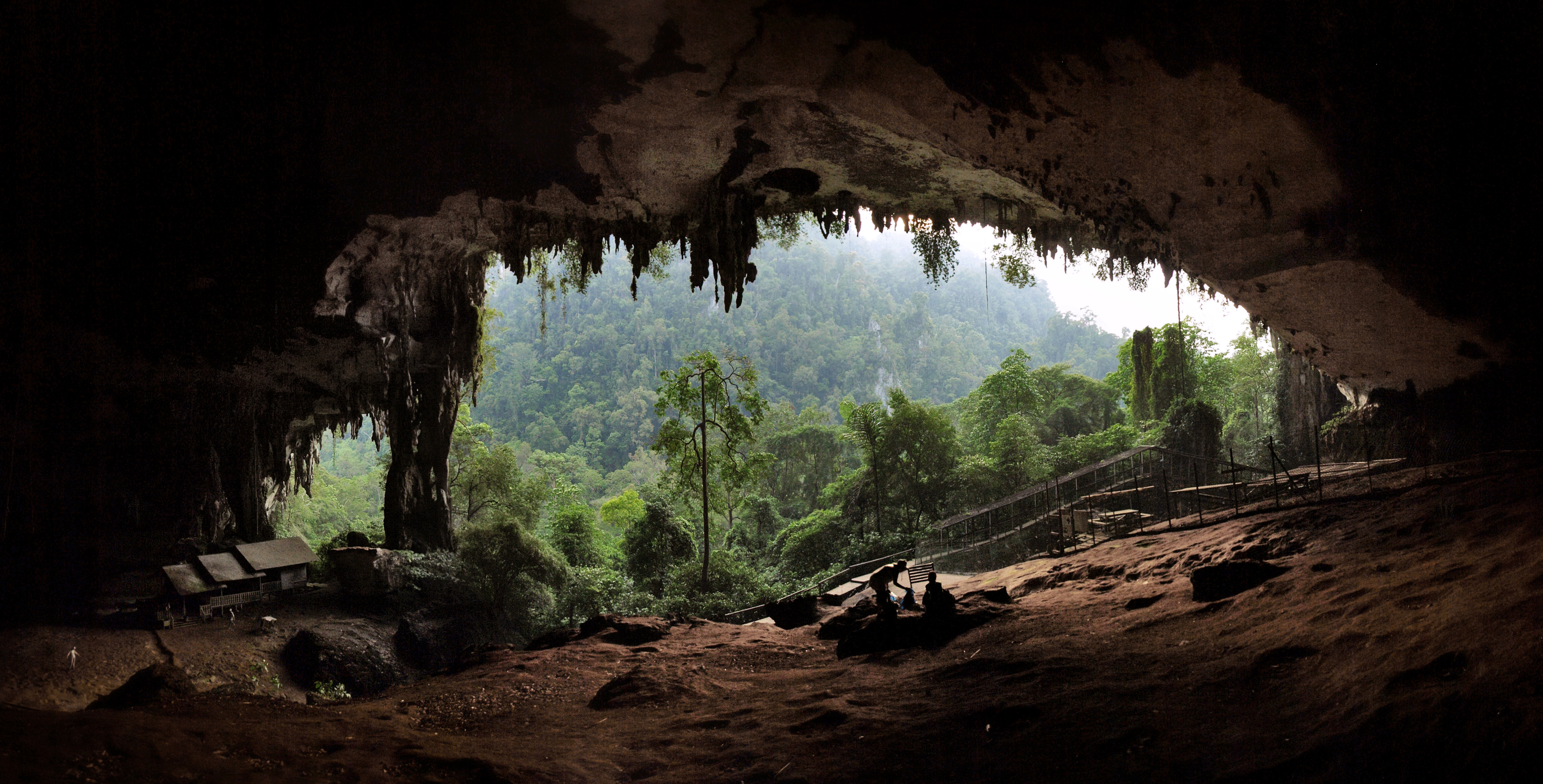
Niah Cave entrance at sunset

The region was already inhabited by Homo erectus from approximately 1,500,000 years ago during the Middle Pleistocene age. Data analysis of stone tool assemblages and fossil discoveries from Indonesia, Southern China, the Philippines, Sri Lanka and more recently Cambodia and Malaysia has established Homo erectus migration routes and episodes of presence as early as 120,000 years ago, with even older isolated finds dating back to 1.8 million years ago. Java Man (Homo erectus erectus) and Homo floresiensis both discovered on Indonesia's islands, attest to a sustained regional presence and isolation, long enough for notable diversification of the species' specifics. Rock art (parietal art) dating from 40,000 to 60,000 years ago (which is currently the world's oldest) has been discovered in the caves of Sulawesi and Borneo (Kalimantan). Homo floresiensis also lived in the area up until at least 50,000 years ago, after which they became extinct. Modern Homo sapiens groups, ancestral to Ancient East Eurasians (Eastern non-Africans), including East Asians (Onge and Tianyuan related) populations, and Oceanian (Papuan-related) populations, reached the region by 50,000 BCE to 70,000 BCE, with some arguing earlier. These immigrants might have, to some extent, merged and reproduced with members of the archaic population of Homo erectus, as the fossil discoveries in the Tam Pa Ling Cave suggest. During much of this time the present-day islands of western Indonesia were joined into a single landmass known as Sundaland due to lower sea levels.

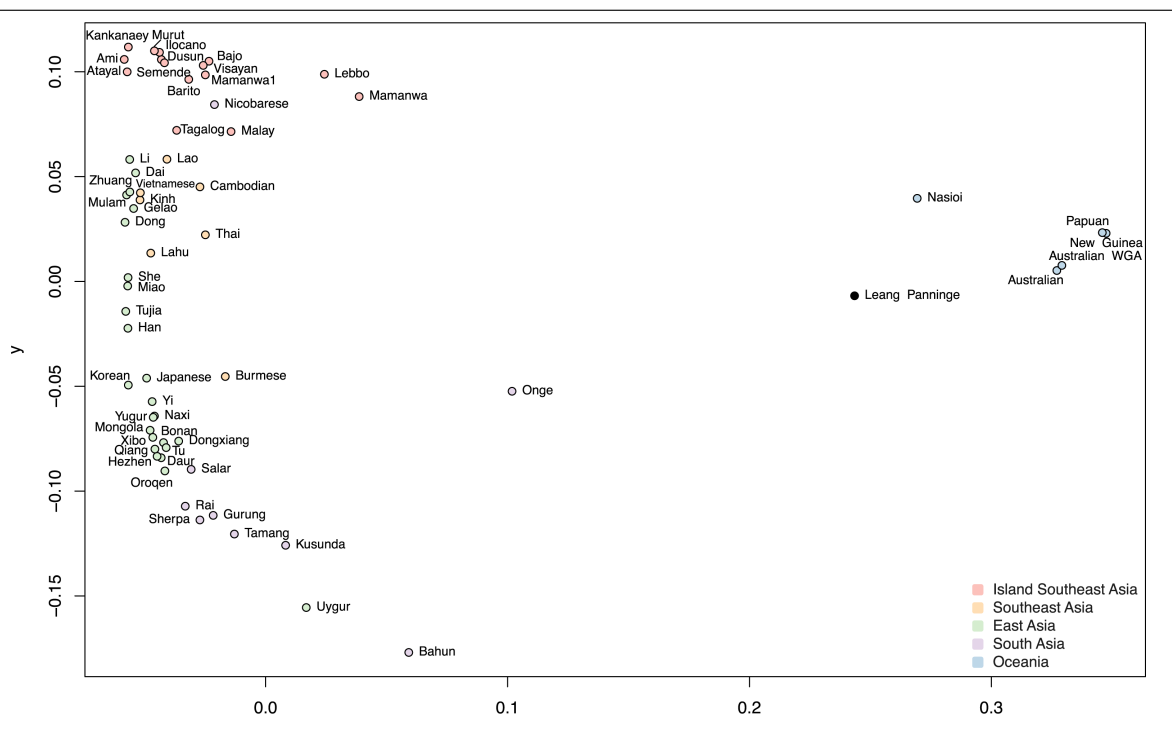
Genetic difference between Leang Panninge(one Holocene hunter-gatherer in Maritime Southeast Asia) and East and southeast Asian and Near Oceanian groups.

Distinctive East Eurasian (Eastern non-African) ancestry was recently found to have originated in Mainland Southeast Asia at ~50,000 BCE, and expanded through multiple migration waves southwards and northwards respectively, giving rise to both Oceanian (Papuan-related) and East Asian (Onge and Tianyuan related) lineages.

Ancient remains of hunter-gatherers in Maritime Southeast Asia, such as one Holocene hunter-gatherer from cave of Leang Panninge in South Sulawesi, had ancestry from both the Oceanian lineage (represented by Papuans and Aboriginal Australians), and the basal East Asian lineage (represented by Onge or Tianyuan related ancestry). The hunter-gatherer individual had approximately 50% "basal East Asian" ancestry and was positioned in between the Andamanese Onge and the Papuans of Oceania. The authors concluded that the presence of this type of ancestry in the Holocene hunter-gatherer suggests that the expansion of East Asian-related ancestry from Mainland Southeast Asia into Maritime Southeast Asia may have taken place long before the expansion of Austronesian societies.

Geneflow of East Asian-related ancestry into Maritime Southeast Asia and Oceania is estimated to ~25,000 BCE (possibly as early as 50,000 BCE). The pre-Neolithic Oceanian-related populations of Maritime Southeast Asia were largely replaced by the expansion of various East Asian populations, beginning about 25,000 BCE from Mainland Southeast Asia. East Asian-related ancestry was widespread across Southeast Asia by 15,000 BCE, predating the expansion of Austroasiatic and Austronesian peoples.

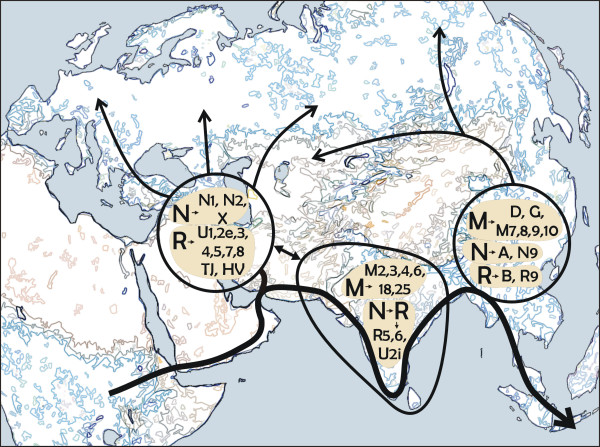
Representation of the coastal migration model, with the indication of the later development of mitochondrial haplogroups

Ocean drops of up to 120 m (393.70 ft) below the present level during Pleistocene glacial periods revealed the vast lowlands known as Sundaland, enabling hunter-gatherer populations to freely access insular Southeast Asia via extensive terrestrial corridors. Modern human presence in the Niah cave on East Malaysia dates back to 40,000 years BP, although archaeological documentation of the early settlement period suggests only brief occupation phases. However, author Charles Higham argues that despite glacial periods, modern humans were able to cross the sea barrier beyond Java and Timor, who around 45,000 years ago left traces in the Ivane Valley in eastern New Guinea "at an altitude of 2,000 m (6,561.68 ft) exploiting yams and pandanus, hunting and making stone tools between 43,000 and 49,000 years ago."

The oldest habitation discovered in the Philippines is located at the Tabon Caves and dates back to approximately 50,000 years BP. Items found there such as burial jars, earthenware, jade ornaments and other jewellery, stone tools, animal bones and human fossils date back to 47,000 years BP. Unearthed human remains are approximately 24,000 years old.

Signs of an early tradition are discernible in the Hoabinhian, the name given to an industry and cultural continuity of stone tools and flaked cobble artefacts that appear around 10,000 BP in caves and rock shelters first described in Hòa Bình, Vietnam, and later documented in Terengganu, Malaysia, Sumatra, Thailand, Laos, Myanmar, Cambodia, and Yunnan in southern China. Research emphasises considerable variations in quality and nature of the artefacts, influenced by region-specific environmental conditions and proximity and access to local resources. The Hoabinhian culture accounts for the first verified ritual burials in Southeast Asia.

Hoabinhian related genetic samples show the closest genetic affinities to basal East Asian lineages related to the Upper Paleolithic Tianyuan man from northern China, as well as the prehistoric Jōmon peoples of Japan. Compared to modern-day populations, they share the closest affinities with the Andamanese Onge and Jarawa, and the Semang (also known as "Malaysian Negritos") and Maniq in the interior of the Malay Peninsula.

=== Neolithic migrations ===
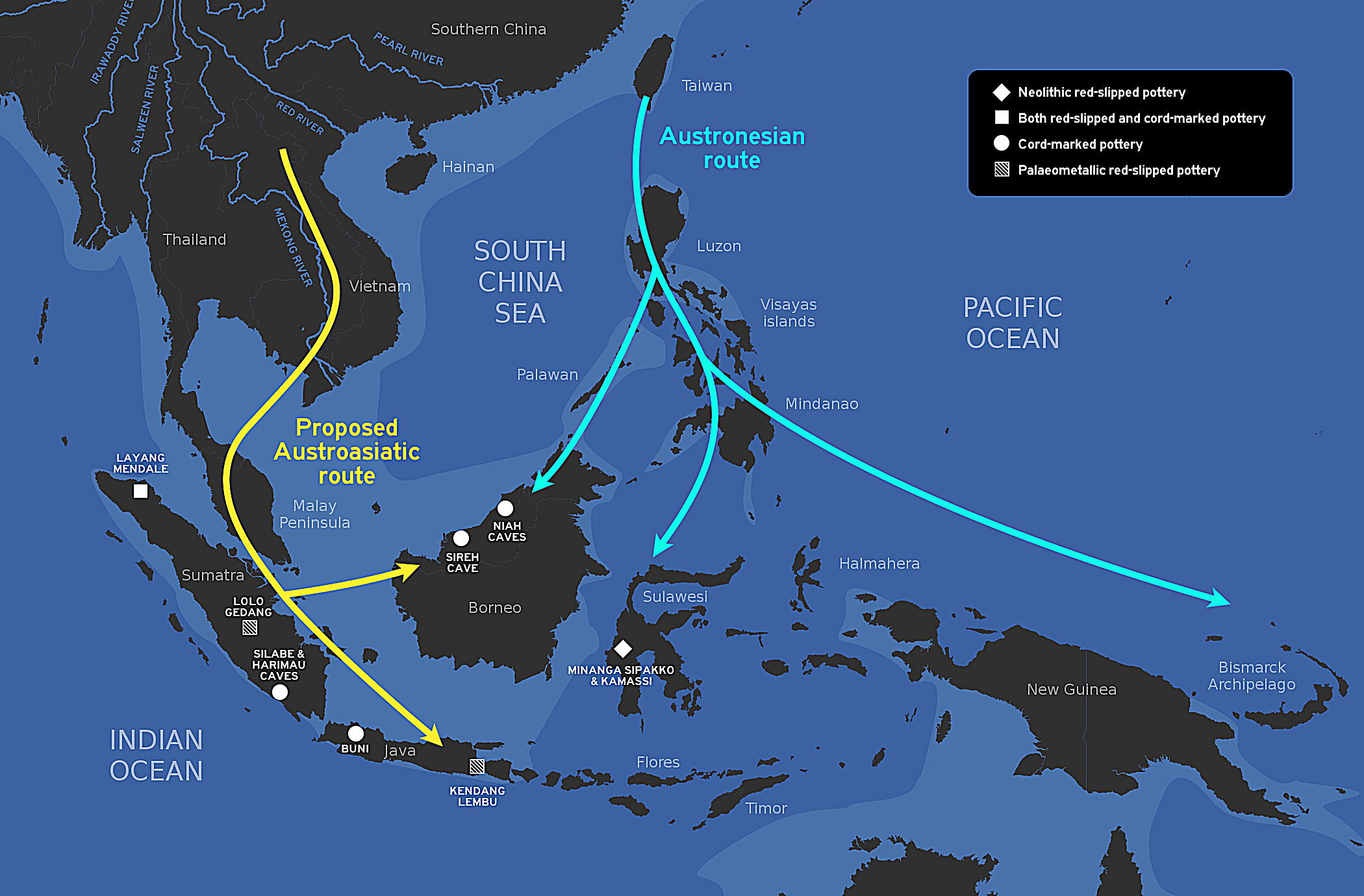
Proposed routes of Austroasiatic and Austronesian migrations into Indonesia

The Neolithic was characterised by several migrations into Mainland and Island Southeast Asia from southern China by Austronesian, Austroasiatic, Kra-Dai and Hmong–Mien speakers.

The Austronesian Expansion (3500 BCE–1200 CE)

The most widespread migration event was the Austronesian expansion, which began around 5,500 BP (3,500 BCE) from Taiwan and coastal southern China. Due to their early invention of ocean-going outrigger boats and voyaging catamarans, Austronesians rapidly colonised Island Southeast Asia, before spreading further into Micronesia, Melanesia, Polynesia, Madagascar and the Comoros. They dominated the lowlands and coasts of Island Southeast Asia, intermarrying with the indigenous Negrito and Papuan peoples to varying degrees, giving rise to modern Islander Southeast Asians, Micronesians, Polynesians, Melanesians and Malagasy.

A separate migration wave, generally associated with Austroasiatic-speaking peoples, had expanded and migrated across the broad riverine floodplains of Mainland Southeast Asia and the Malaysian peninsula. A 2018 study identified a characteristic lineage that can be associated with the spread of Austroasiatic languages in Southeast Asia and which can be traced back to remains of Neolithic farmers from Mán Bạc (c. 2000 BCE) in the Red River Delta in northern Vietnam, and to closely related Ban Chiang and Vat Komnou remains in Thailand and Cambodia respectively.

=== Early agricultural societies ===
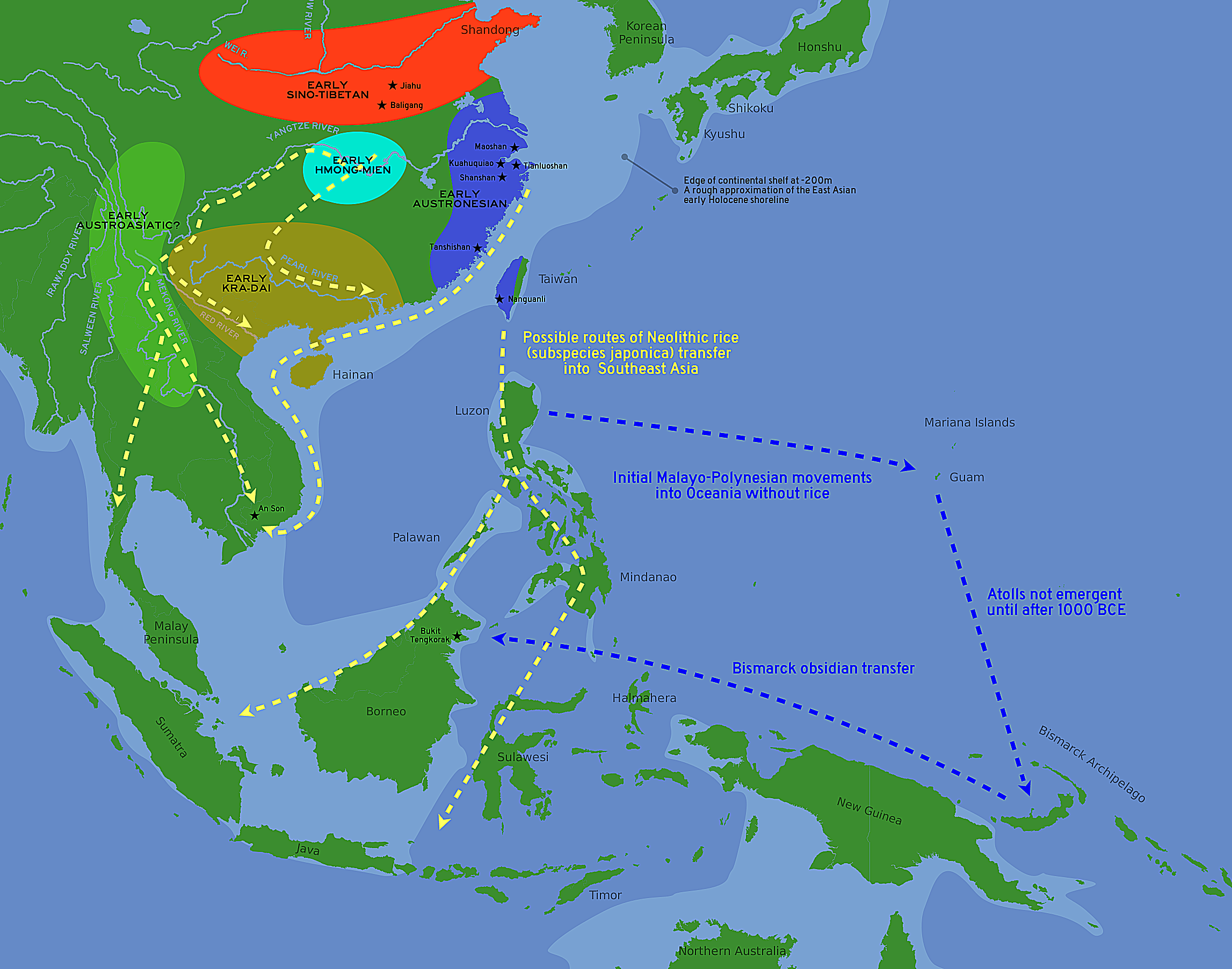
Possible language family homelands and likely routes of early rice transfer (c. 3500–500 BCE). The approximate coastlines during the early Holocene are shown in lighter blue.

Territorial principalities in both Insular and Mainland Southeast Asia, characterised as Agrarian kingdoms, developed an economy by around 500 BCE based on surplus crop cultivation and moderate coastal trade of domestic natural products. Several states of the Malayan-Indonesian "thalassian" zone shared these characteristics with Mainland Southeast Asian polities like the Pyu city-states in the Irrawaddy River valley, the Văn Lang kingdom in the Red River Delta and Funan around the lower Mekong. Văn Lang, founded in the 7th century BCE, endured until 258 BCE under the Hồng Bàng dynasty, as part of the Đông Sơn culture that sustained a dense and organised population that produced an elaborate Bronze Age industry.

Intensive wet-rice cultivation in an ideal climate enabled the farming communities to produce a regular crop surplus that was used by the ruling elite to raise, command and pay work forces for public construction and maintenance projects such as canals and fortifications.

Though millet and rice cultivation was introduced around 2000 BCE, hunting and gathering remained an important aspect of food provision, in particular in forested and mountainous inland areas. Many tribal communities of the aboriginal Australo-Melanesian settlers continued a lifestyle of mixed sustenance until the modern era. Many areas in Southeast Asia participated in the Maritime Jade Road, a diverse sea-based trade network which functioned for 3,000 years, mostly in Southeast Asia, between 2000 BCE to 1000 CE.

=== Bronze Age Southeast Asia ===
Đông Sơn drum

The earliest known evidence of copper and bronze production in Southeast Asia was found at Ban Chiang in north-east Thailand and among the Phùng Nguyên culture of northern Vietnam around 2000 BCE.

The Đông Sơn culture established a tradition of bronze production and the manufacture of evermore refined bronze and iron objects, such as plows, axes and sickles with shaft holes, socketed arrows and spearheads and small ornamented items. By about 500 BCE, large and delicately decorated bronze drums of remarkable quality, weighing more than 70 kg (150 lb), were produced in the laborious lost-wax casting process. This industry of highly sophisticated metal processing was developed independent of Chinese or Indian influence. Historians relate these achievements to the presence of organised, centralised and hierarchical communities and a large population.

=== Pottery culture ===
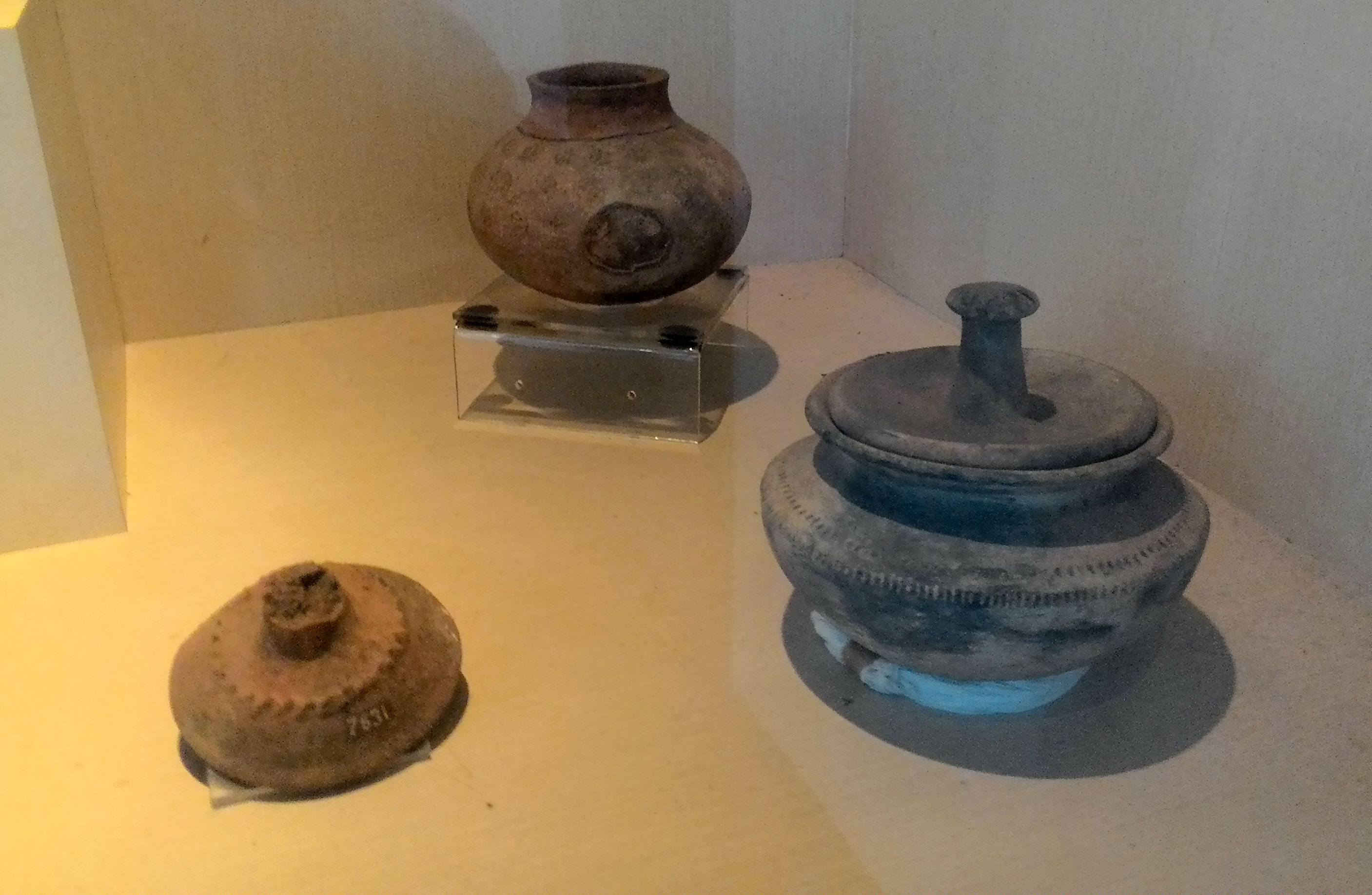
Buni clay pottery

Between 1000 BCE and 100 CE, the Sa Huỳnh culture flourished along the south-central coast of Vietnam. Ceramic jar burial sites that included grave goods have been discovered at various sites along the entire territory. Among large, thin-walled terracotta jars, ornamented and colorised cooking pots, glass items, jade earrings and metal objects were deposited near the rivers and along the coast.

The Buni culture is the name given to another early independent centre of refined pottery production that has been well documented on the basis of excavated burial gifts, deposited between 400 BCE and 100 CE in coastal north-western Java. The objects and artifacts of the Buni tradition are known for their originality and remarkable quality of incised and geometric decors. Its resemblance to the Sa Huỳnh culture and the fact that it represents the earliest Indian Rouletted Ware recorded in Southeast Asia are subjects of ongoing research.

== Early historical era ==
=== Austronesian maritime trade network ===
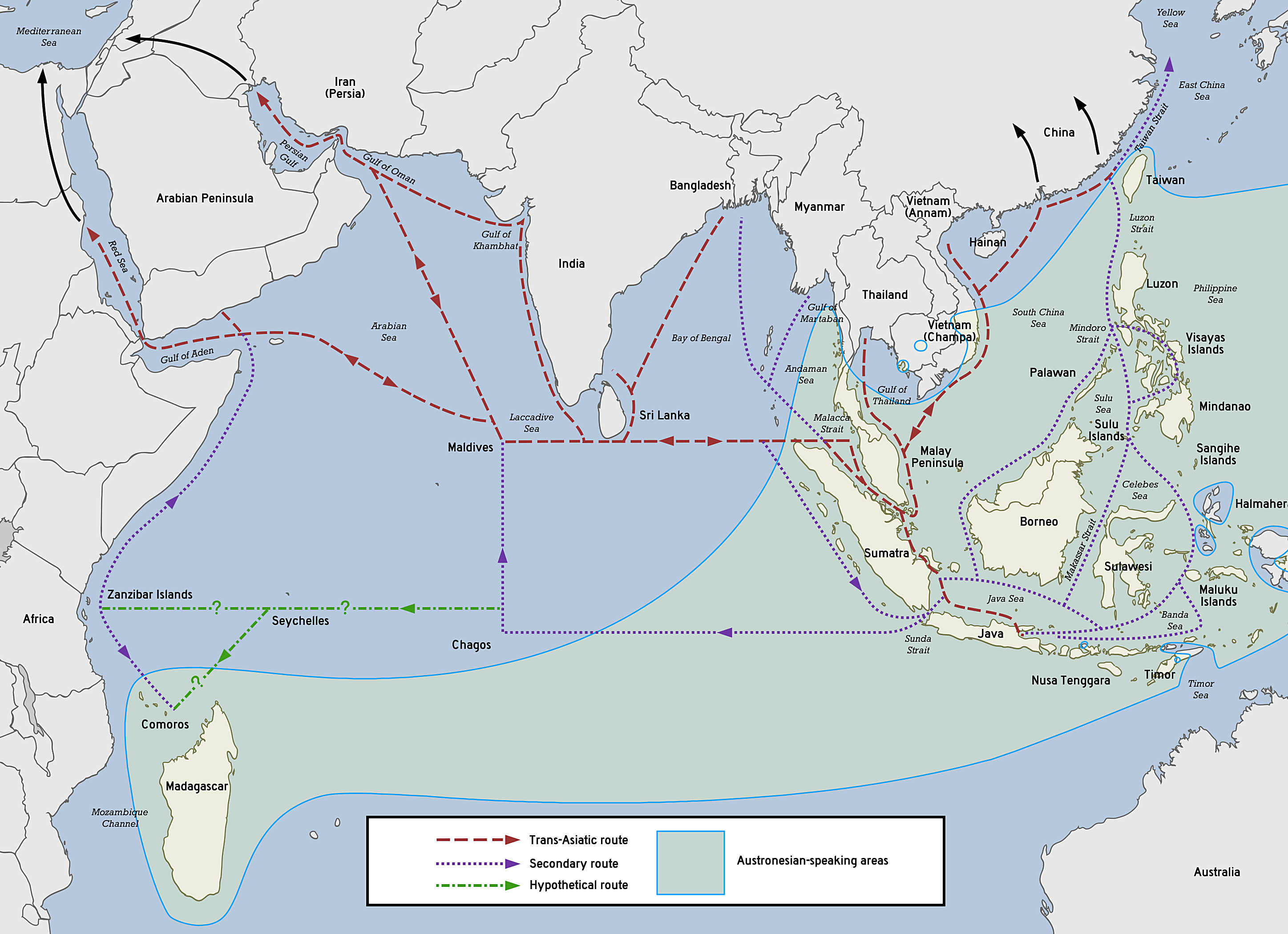
Austronesian proto-historic and historic maritime trade network in the Indian Ocean

The first true maritime trade network in the Indian Ocean was the Austronesian maritime trade network initiated by the Austronesian peoples of Island Southeast Asia. They established trade routes with Southern India and Sri Lanka as early as 1500 BCE, exchanging material culture (like catamarans, outrigger boats, sewn-plank boats and paan) and cultigens (like coconuts, sandalwood, bananas and sugarcane). The trade network also connected the material cultures of India and China, as well as constituting the majority of the Indian Ocean component of the spice trade. Indonesians in particular were trading in spices (mainly cinnamon and cassia) with East Africa using catamarans and outrigger boats and sailing with the help of the Westerlies in the Indian Ocean. This trade network expanded to reach as far as Africa and the Arabian Peninsula, resulting in the Austronesian colonization of Madagascar by 500 CE. It continued through historic times, later becoming the Maritime Silk Road. This trade network also included smaller trade routes within Island Southeast Asia, including the lingling-o jade and trepanging networks.

In eastern Austronesia, various traditional maritime trade networks also existed. Among them were the ancient Lapita trade network of Island Melanesia; the Hiri trade cycle, Sepik Coast exchange and Kula ring of Papua New Guinea; the ancient trading voyages in Micronesia between the Mariana Islands and the Caroline Islands (and possibly also New Guinea and the Philippines); and the vast inter-island trade networks of Polynesia.

=== Indianised kingdoms ===
Hinduism's expansion in Asia, from its heartland in Indian Subcontinent, to the rest of Asia, especially Southeast Asia, started circa 1st century CE marked with the establishment of early Hindu settlements and polities in Southeast Asia.

By around 500BCE, Asia's expanding land and maritime trade led to socio-economic and cultural stimulation and diffusion of mainly Hindu beliefs into the regional cosmology of Southeast Asia. Iron Age trade expansion also caused regional geostrategic remodelling. Southeast Asia was now situated at the convergence of the Indian and the East Asian maritime trade routes, a basis for economic and cultural growth. The concept of "Indianised kingdoms", a term coined by French scholar George Cœdès, describes how Southeast Asian principalities incorporated central aspects of Indian institutions, religion, statecraft, administration, culture, epigraphy, writing and architecture.

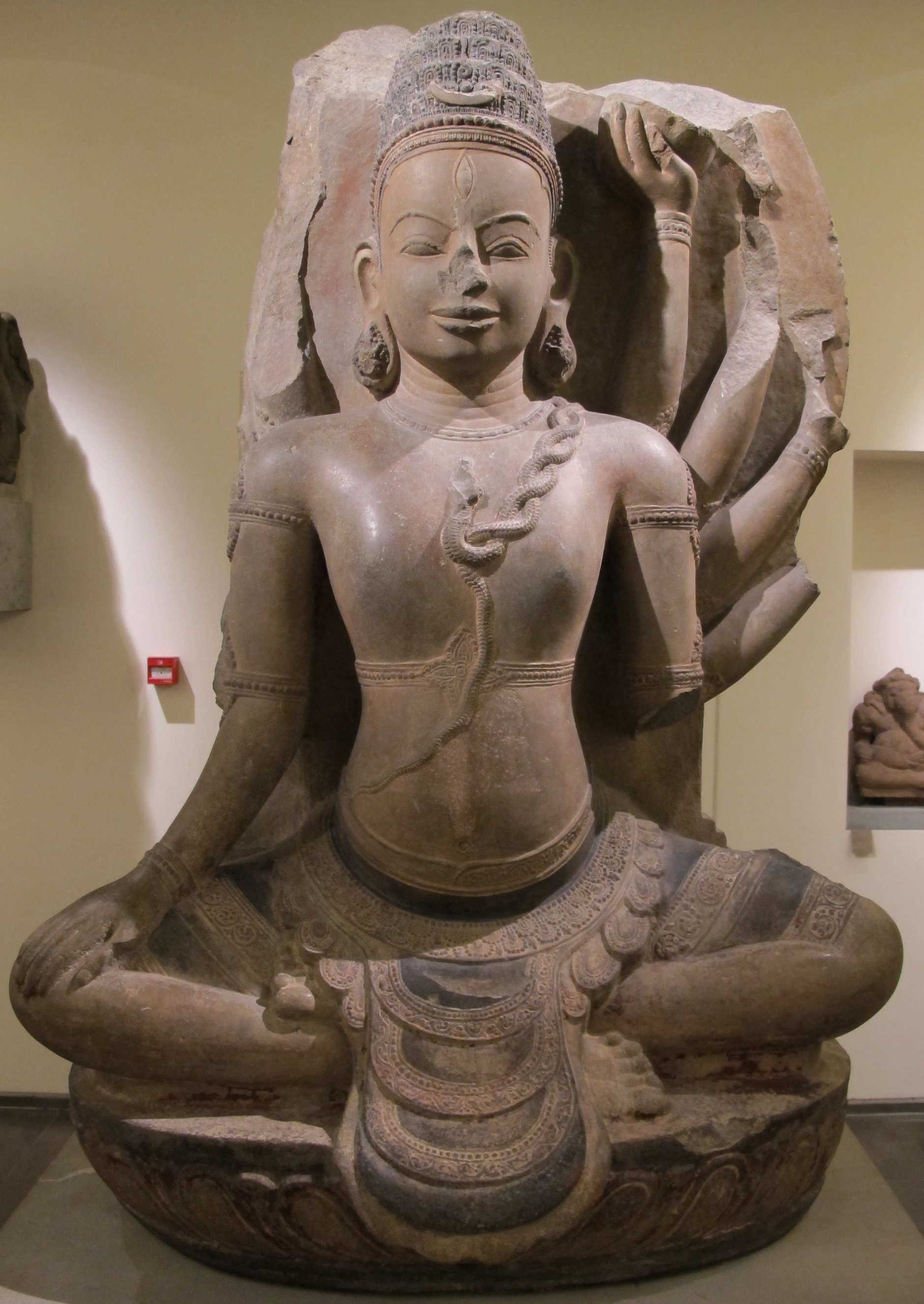
Shiva statue, Champa (modern Vietnam)

The earliest Hindu kingdoms emerged in Sumatra and Java, followed by mainland polities such as Funan and Champa. Selective adoption of Indian sociocultural elements stimulated the emergence of centralised states and development of highly organised societies. Local leaders began to adopt Hindu worship into state religion, using the Hindu concept of devarāja to reinforce divine rule (as opposed to the Chinese concept of Mandate of Heaven).

The exact nature, process and extent of Indian influence upon the civilisations of the region is still fiercely debated by contemporary scholars. One such debate is over the extent to which Indian merchants, Brahmins, nobles or Southeast Asian mariner-merchants played central roles in bringing Indian conceptions to Southeast Asia. Additionally, the depth of the influence of Indian traditions is still contested. Whereas early 20th-century scholars emphasized the thorough Indianisation of Southeast Asia, more recent authors have argued that Indian influence was much more limited, affecting only a small section of the elite.

Maritime trade from China to India passed Champa and Funan at the Mekong Delta, proceeded along the coast to the Isthmus of Kra, portaged across the narrow and transhipped for distribution in India. This trading link boosted the development of Funan, its successor Chenla and the Malayan states of Langkasuka on the eastern coast and Kedah on the western.

Numerous coastal communities in maritime Southeast Asia adopted Hindu and Buddhist cultural and religious elements from India and developed complex polities ruled by native dynasties. Early Hindu kingdoms in Indonesia include the 4th-century Kutai that rose in East Kalimantan, Tarumanagara in West Java and Kalingga in Central Java.

=== Early relations with China ===
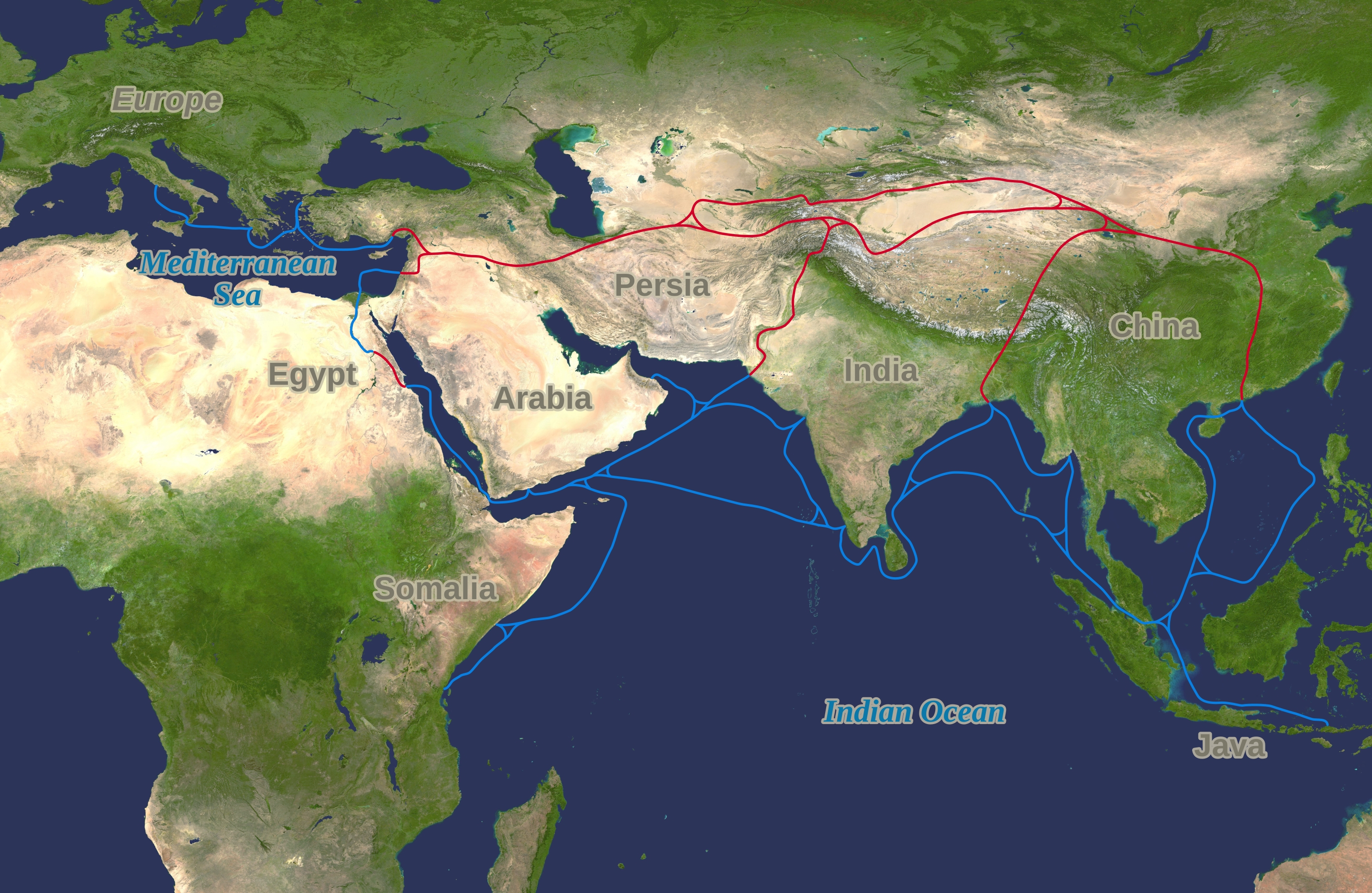
Major trading routes in the pre-colonial Eastern Hemisphere

The earliest attested trading contacts in Southeast Asia were with the Chinese Shang dynasty (c. 1600–1046 BCE), when cowry shells served as currency. During the Zhou dynasty (1050–771 BCE), various natural products, such as ivory, rhinoceros horn, tortoise shells, pearls and birds' feathers found their way to Luoyang, the Zhou capital. Although current knowledge about port localities and shipping lanes is very limited, it is assumed that most of this exchange took place on land routes, and only a small percentage was shipped "on coastal vessels crewed by Malay and Yue traders".

Military conquests during the Han dynasty (202 BCE–220 CE) brought a number of foreign peoples within the Chinese empire when the Imperial Chinese tributary system began to evolve under Han rule. This tributary system was based on the Chinese worldview that had developed under the Shang dynasty, in which China was deemed the centre and apogee of culture and civilisation, the "Middle kingdom" (Mandarin: 中国, Zhōngguó), surrounded by several layers of increasingly barbarous peoples. Contact with Southeast Asia steadily increased by the end of the Han period.

Between the 2nd-century BCE and 15th-century CE, the Maritime Silk Road flourished, connecting China, Southeast Asia, the Indian subcontinent, the Arabian Peninsula, Somalia and all the way to Egypt and Europe. Despite its association with China in recent centuries, the Maritime Silk Road was primarily established and operated by Austronesian sailors in Southeast Asia and by Persian and Arab traders in the Arabian Sea.

The Maritime Silk Road developed from the earlier Austronesian spice trade networks of Islander Southeast Asians with Sri Lanka and Southern India (established 1000–600 BCE), as well as the jade industry trade in lingling-o artifacts from the Philippines in the South China Sea (c. 500 BCE). For most of its history, Austronesian thalassocracies controlled the flow of the Maritime Silk Road, especially the polities around the Strait of Malacca and Bangka, the Malay Peninsula and the Mekong Delta (although Chinese records misidentified these kingdoms as being "Indian" due to the Indianisation of these regions). Prior to the 10th century, the route was primarily used by Southeast Asian traders, although Tamil and Persian traders also sailed them. The route was influential in the early spread of Hinduism and Buddhism to the East.

China later built its own fleets starting from the Song dynasty in the 10th century, participating directly in the trade route up until the end of the Colonial Era and the collapse of the Qing dynasty.

=== Spread of Buddhism ===
The spread of Buddhism throughout Asia

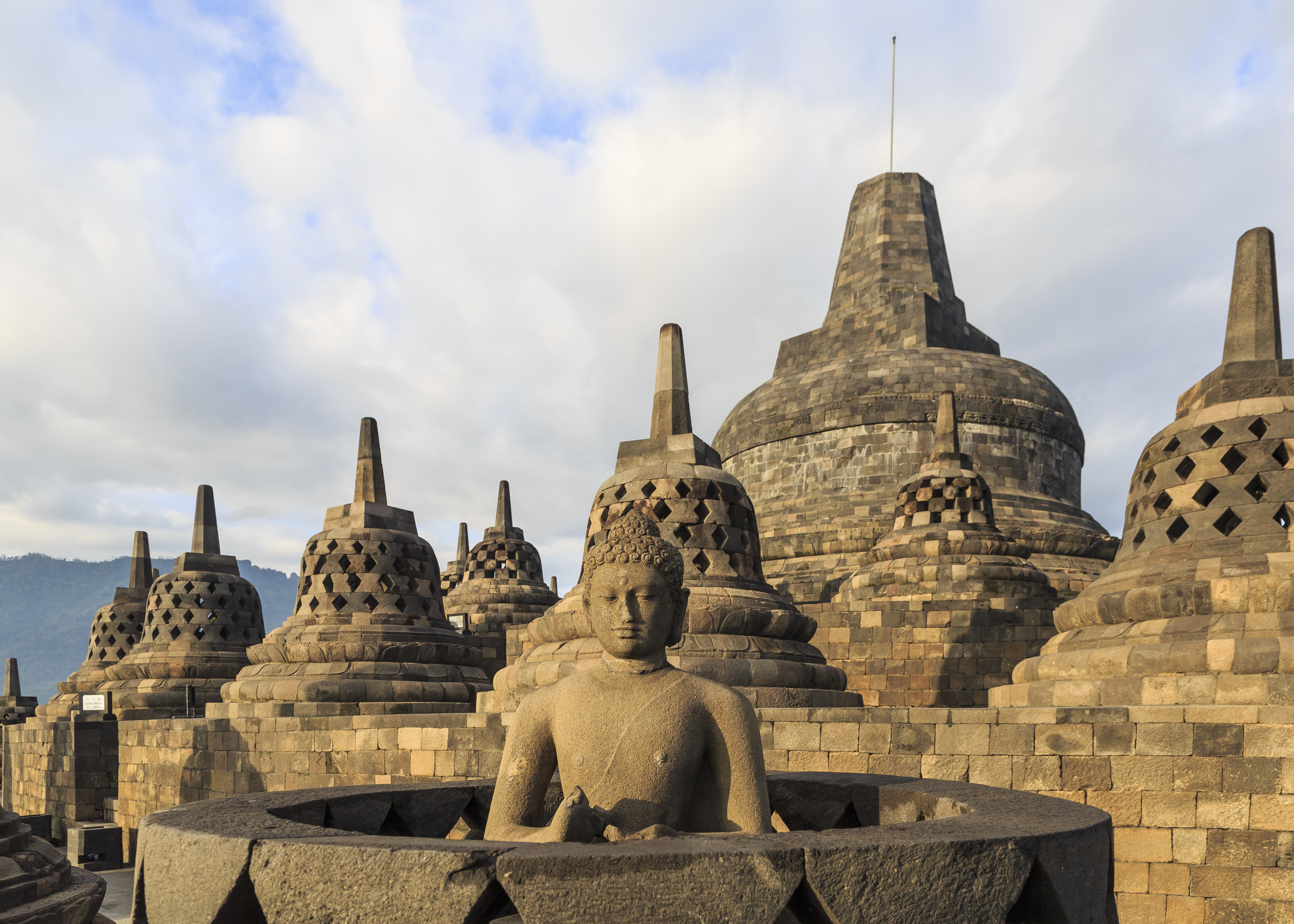
Borobudur stupa, central Java (9th century)

Local rulers benefited from the introduction of Hinduism during the early common era, using it to greatly enhance the legitimacy of their reign as devarāja. Historians increasingly argue that the process of Hindu religious diffusion in the region must be attributed to the initiative of the local chieftains. Buddhist teachings, which almost simultaneously arrived in Southeast Asia, developed during the subsequent centuries, gaining more appeal among the general population. In the 3rd century BCE, the Buddhist Indian Emperor Ashoka initiated missionary efforts to send trained monks and missionaries abroad to proselytise Buddhism, including its sizeable body of literature, oral traditions, iconography and art. To missionaries used Buddhist teachings to offer guidance in central existential questions, placing an emphasis on individual effort and conduct.

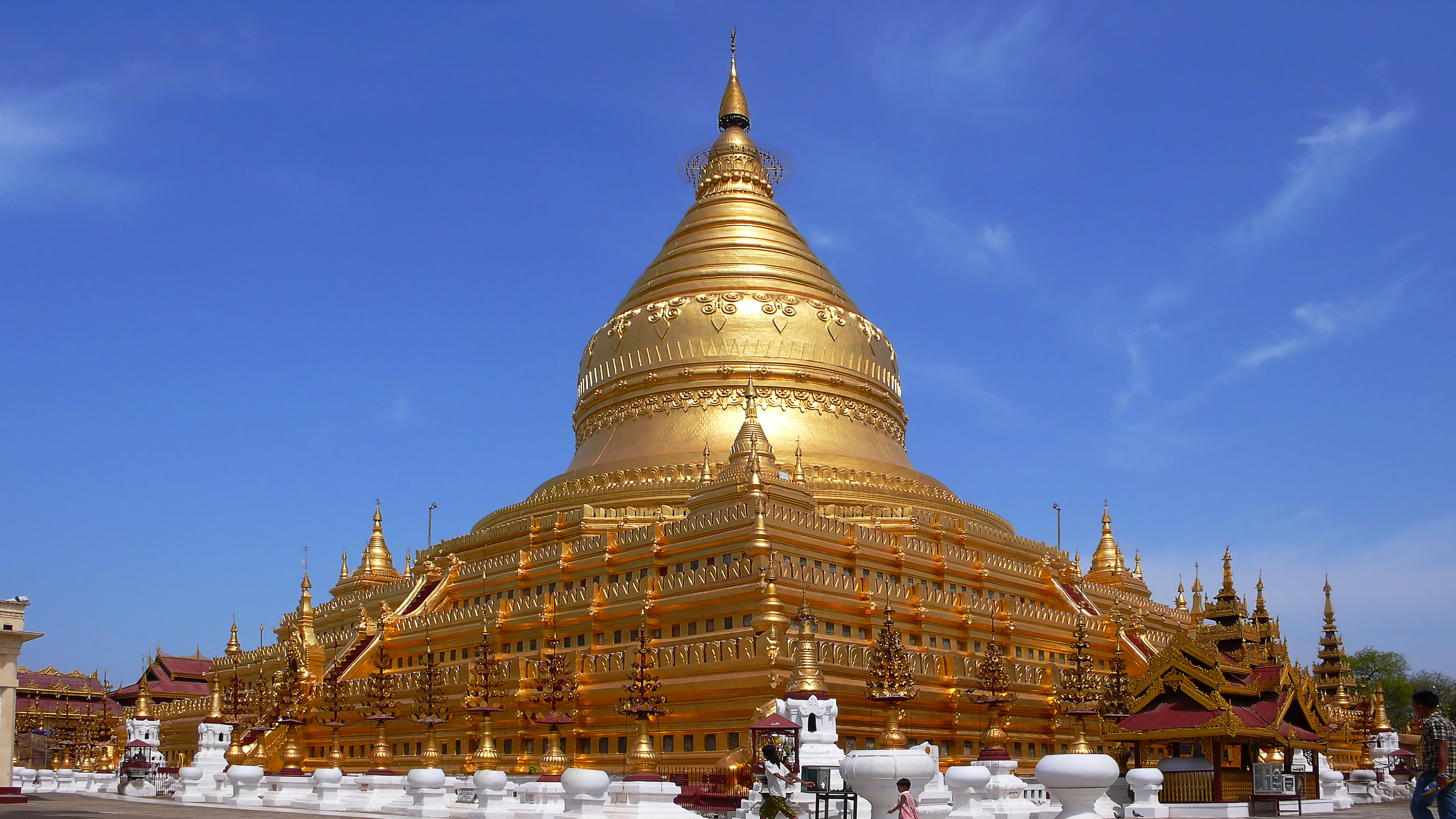
Shwezigon golden pagoda in Bagan, Myanmar (12th century)

Between the 5th and the 13th century CE, Buddhism flourished in Southeast Asia. By the 8th century, the Buddhist Srivijaya kingdom based in Sumatra emerged as a major trading power in central Maritime Southeast Asia. Around the same period, the Shailendra dynasty of Java extensively promoted Buddhist art that found its strongest expression in the vast Borobudur temple. Following the establishment of the Khmer Empire in Cambodia, the first Buddhist kings of Mainland Southeast Asia emerged during the 11th century. Mahayana Buddhism took hold first in Southeast Asia, as the original Theravada Buddhism had fallen out of favour India centuries before reaching the region. However, a pure form of Theravada Buddhist teachings had been preserved in Sri Lanka since the 3rd century. Pilgrims and wandering monks from Sri Lanka introduced Theravada Buddhism in the Pagan Empire of Burma, the Sukhothai Kingdom in northern Thailand and Laos, the Lower Mekong Basin during Cambodia's dark ages and further into Vietnam and Maritime Southeast Asia.

== Medieval period ==
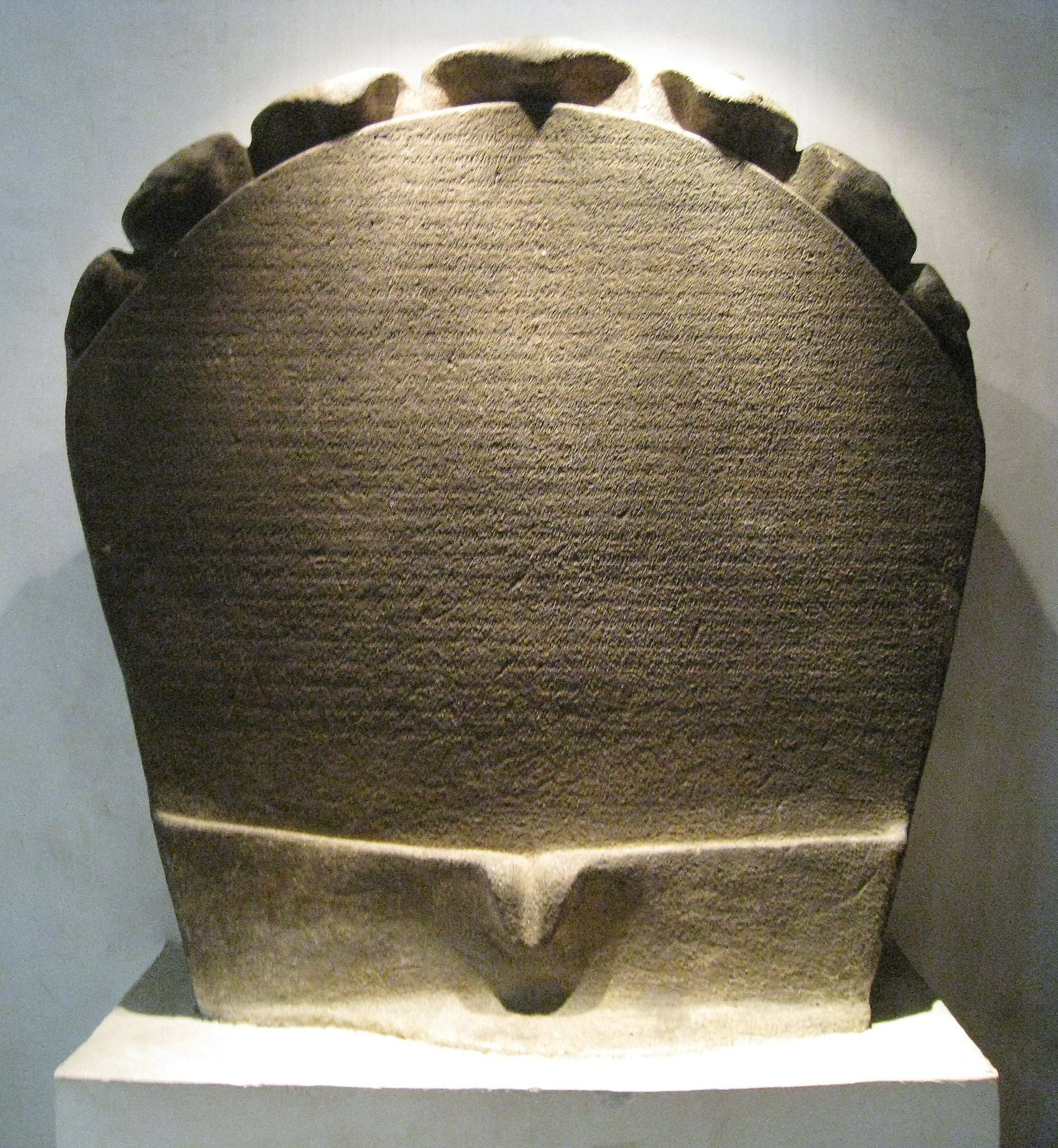
Telaga Batu inscription a Srivijayan inscription used in ceremonial allegiance ritual (7th century)

In Maritime Southeast Asia, the Srivijaya kingdom on Sumatra developed into the dominant power by the 5th century CE. Its capital Palembang became a major seaport and functioned as an entrepôt on the Spice Route between India and China. Srivijaya was also a notable centre of Vajrayāna Buddhist learning and influence. Around the 6th century CE, Malay merchants began sailing to Srivijaya, where goods were transported directly in Sumatran ports. The winds of the Northeast Monsoon during October to December prevented sailing ships from proceeding directly from the Indian Ocean to the South China Sea, as did the Southwest Monsoon during July to September, forcing trade routes to pass through Srivijaya. However, the kingdom's wealth and influence began to fade when advancements in nautical technology in the 10th century enabled Chinese and Indian merchants to ship cargo directly between their countries. These advancements also aided the Chola dynasty of Tamilakam, Southern India, in carrying out a series of destructive attacks on Srivijaya, effectively ending Palembang's entrepôt position in the Indo-Chinese trade route. As the influence of the Srivijaya kingdom faded by about the 13th century, Sumatra came to be ruled by a kaleidoscope of Buddhist kingdoms for the next two centuries, including the Malayu, Pannai, and Dharmasraya kingdoms.

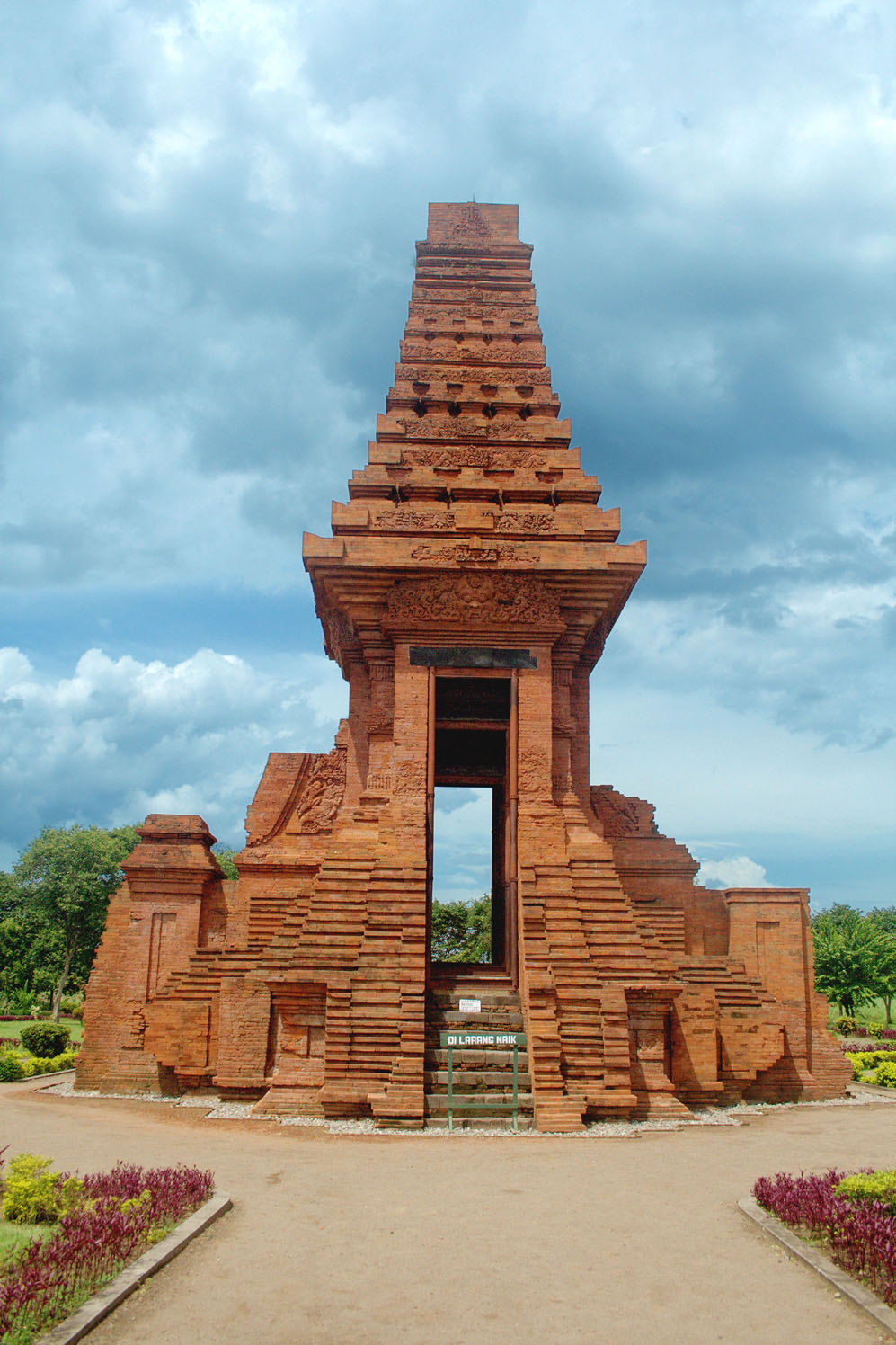
The Bajang Ratu paduraksa gate in Trowulan, the capital of Majapahit (14th century)

To the southeast of Sumatra, West Java was ruled by the Hindu Sunda Kingdom (c. 669–1579) after the fall of the Tarumanagara, while Central and East Java were dominated by a myriad of competing agrarian kingdoms including the Mataram kingdom (716–1016), Kadiri (1042–1222), Singhasari (1222–1292), and Majapahit (1293–c. 1500). In the late 8th and early 9th centuries, the Śailendra dynasty that ruled the Mataram kingdom built a number of massive monuments in Central Java, including the Sewu and Borobudur Buddhist temples. According to the Deśavarṇana, an Old Javanese poem completed in 1365, vassal states of the Majapahit Empire spread throughout much of today's Indonesia, making it possibly the largest empire ever to exist in Southeast Asia, though the true character of its control over these territories is unclear. The empire declined in the early 16th century after the rise of Islamic states in coastal Java, the Malay Peninsula, and Sumatra.

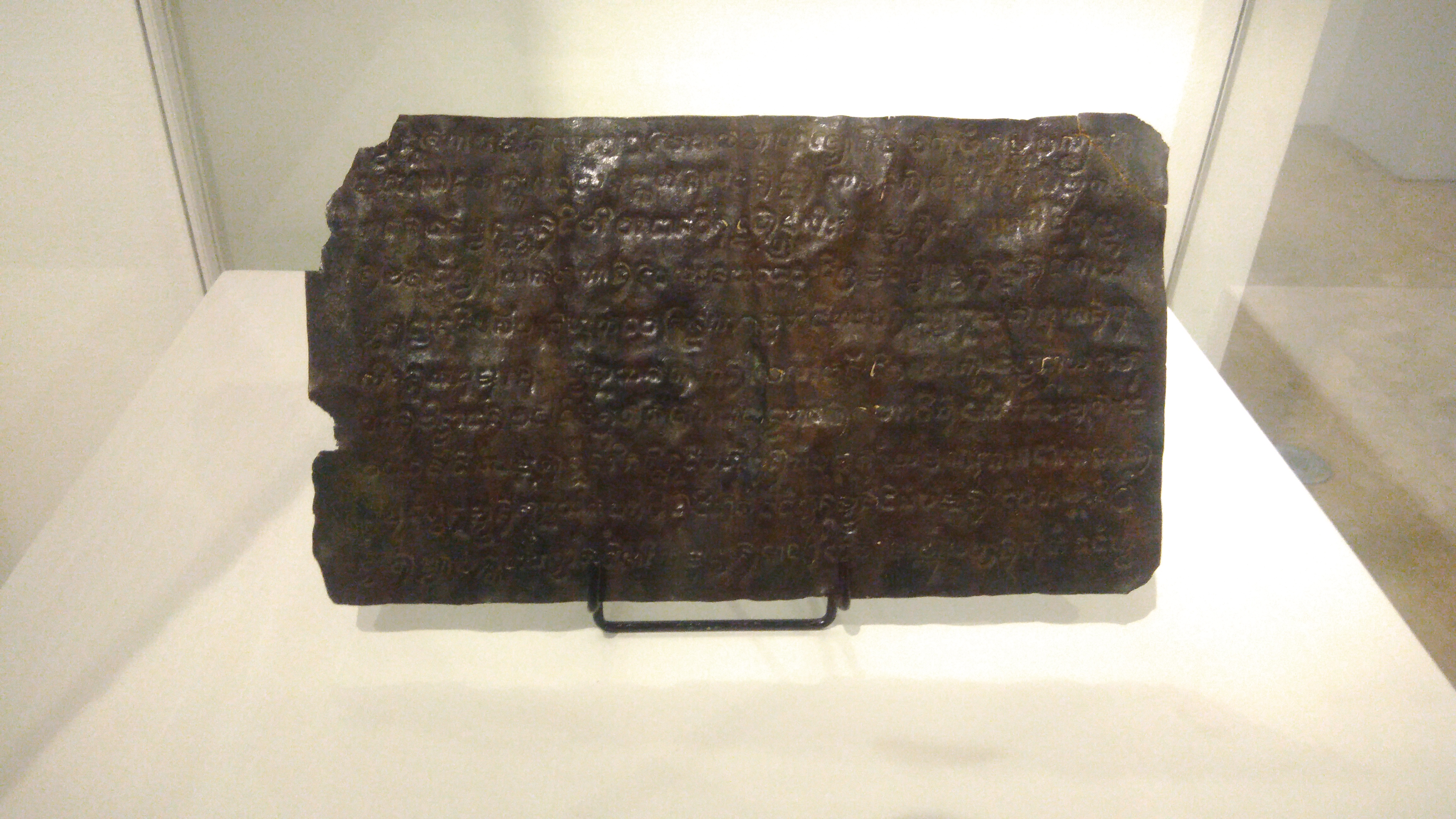
The Laguna Copperplate Inscription, Philippines (c. 900 CE)

In the Philippines, the Laguna Copperplate Inscription dating from 900 CE is the earliest known calendar-dated document from the islands. It relates a debt granted from a maginoo (royalty) who lived in the Tagalog city-state of Tondo which is now part of Manila area. The document mentions several contemporary states in the area, including Mataram kingdom in Java.

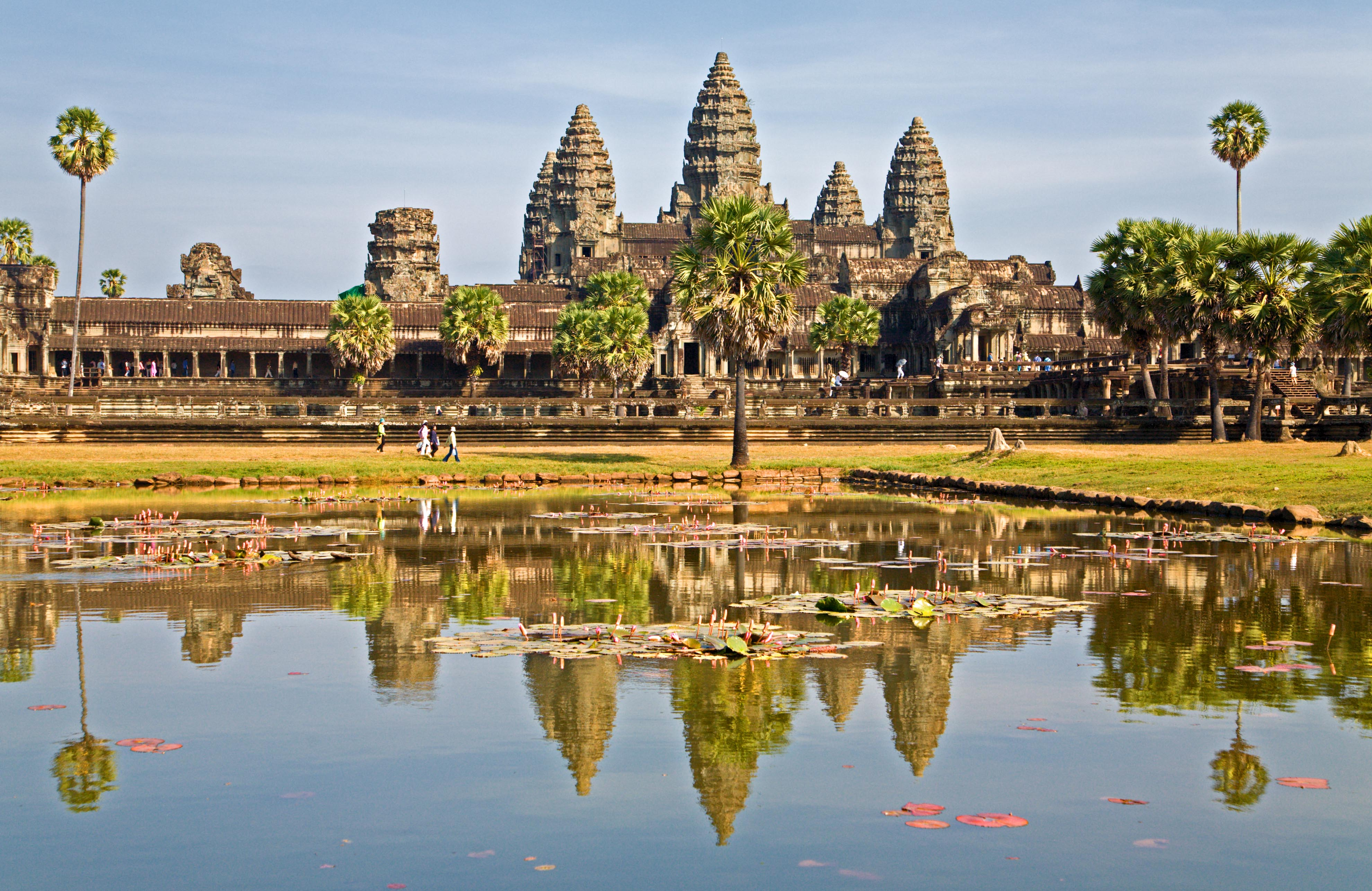
Angkor Wat, Khmer Empire (12th century)

The Khmer Empire covered much of mainland Southeast Asia from the early 9th until the 15th century, during which time a sophisticated architecture was developed, exemplified in the structures of the capital city Angkor. Situated in modern-day Vietnam, the kingdoms of Đại Việt and Champa were rivals to the Khmer Empire in the region. The Mon kingdom of Dvaravati was another major regional presence, first appearing in records around the 6th century CE. By the 10th century, however, Dvaravati had come under the influence of the Khmer. Nearby, Thai tribes conquered the Chao Phraya River valley of modern-day central Thailand around the 12th century and established the Sukhothai Kingdom in the 13th century and the Ayutthaya Kingdom in the 14th century.

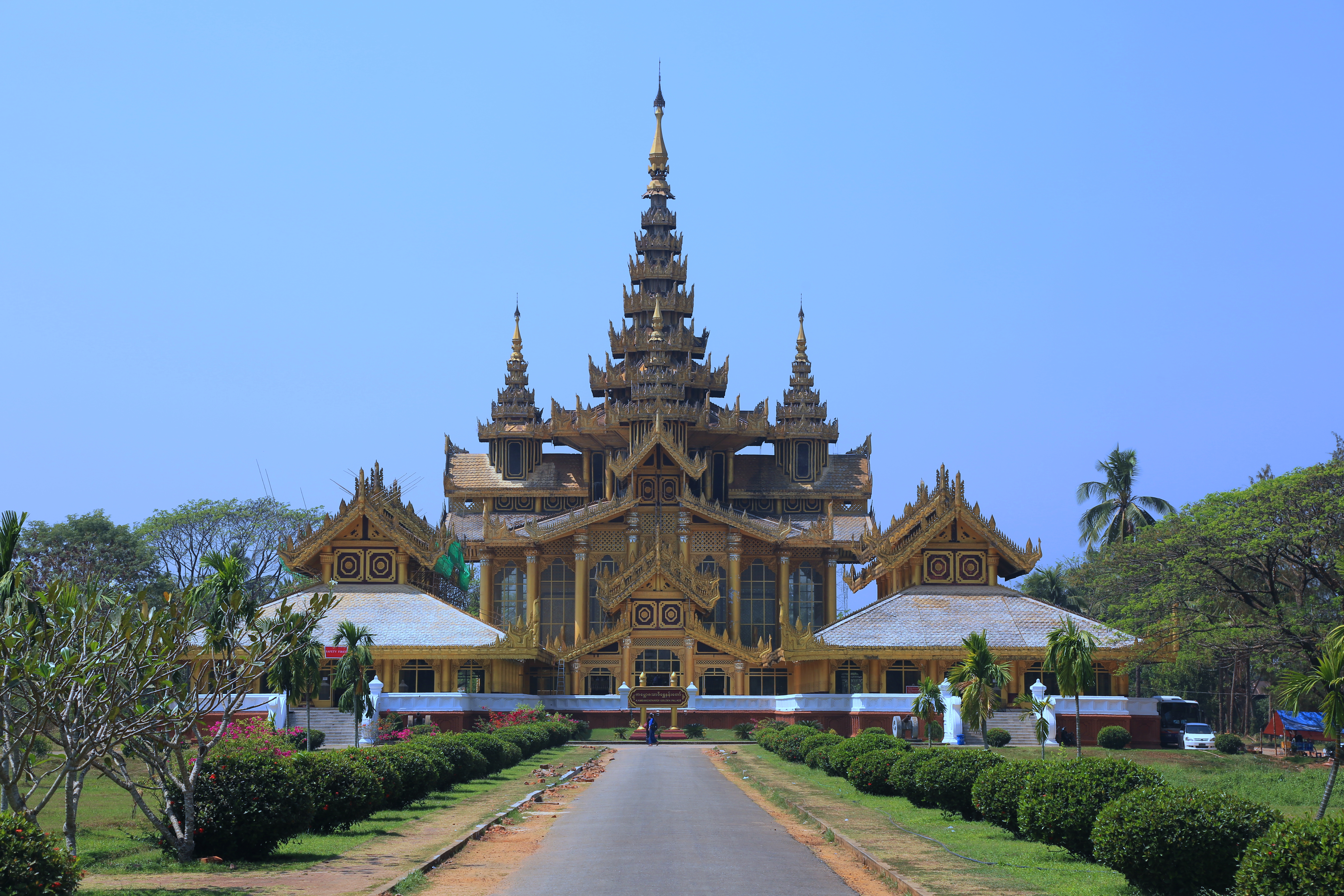
Kanbawzathadi Palace, First Toungoo Empire (16th century)

By the mid-16th century, the Burmese First Toungoo Empire was one of the largest, strongest and richest empires in Southeast Asia. At its peak, it was the dominant power in mainland Southeast Asia, exercising "suzerainty from Manipur to the Cambodian marches and from the borders of Arakan to Yunnan". The empire included Mon and Shan states and annexed territories in the Kingdom of Lan Na, Kingdom of Laos, and the Ayutthaya kingdom. Early European accounts describe the lower part of the Toungoo Empire as having possessed 3–4 excellent ports that facilitated considerable trade in a variety of goods. The empire supplied the port of Malacca with rice and other foodstuffs, along with luxury goods such as rubies, sapphires, musk, lac, benzoin, and gold to trade. In return, the lower part of the empire imported Chinese manufactures and Indonesian spices through its ports. Additionally, merchants from West Asia and India exchanged large quantities of Indian textiles for Burmese luxury products and eastern goods. The arrival of the Portuguese in the 16th century further strengthened the empire's position, both commercially and militarily.

=== Spread of Islam ===
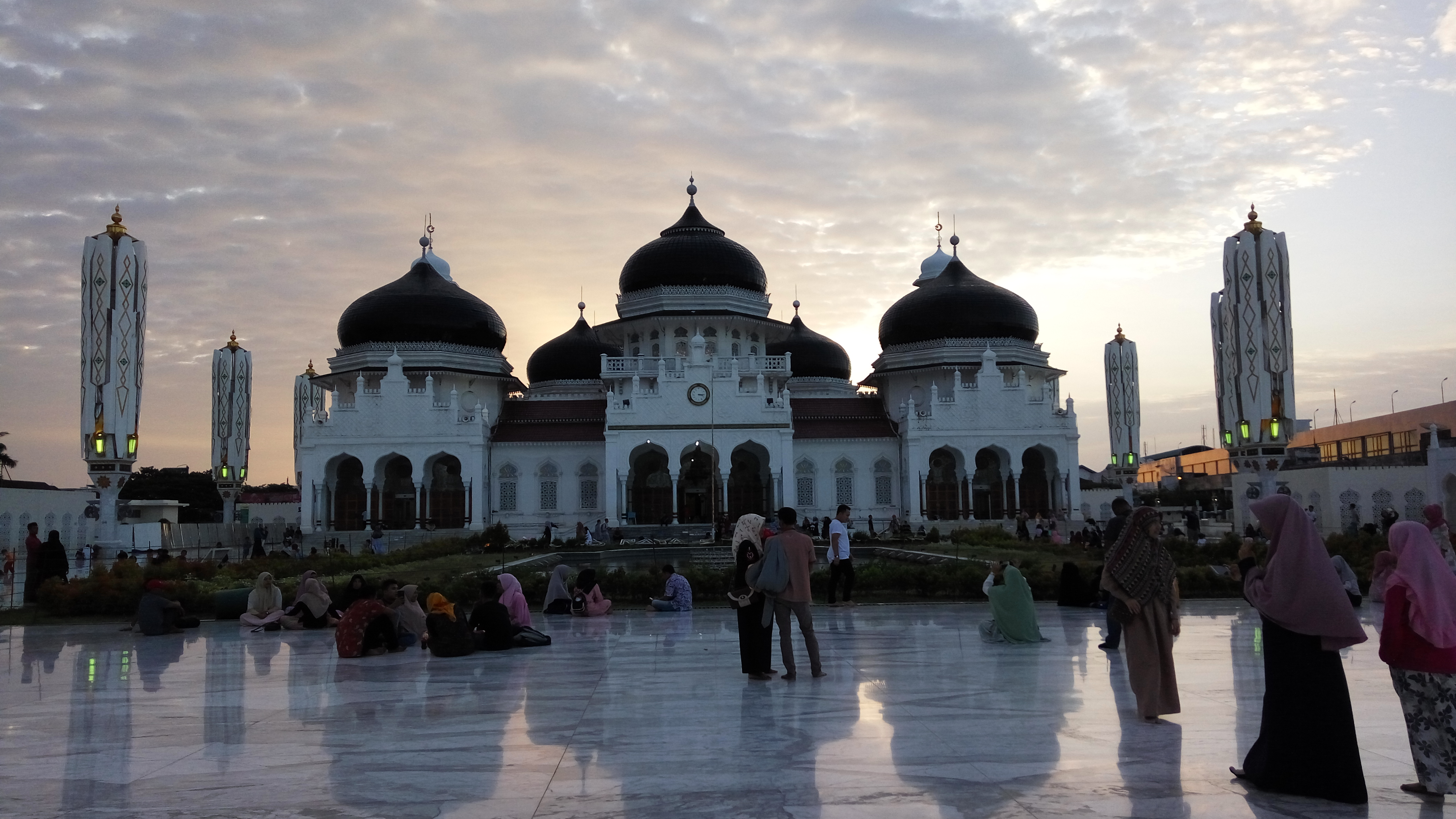
Baiturrahman Grand Mosque in Aceh. This northern tip region of Sumatra was the earliest place where Islam was established in Southeast Asia since the Pasai Sultanate in the 13th century CE.

By the 8th century CE, less than 200 years after the establishment of Islam in Arabia, the first Islamic traders and merchants began to appear in maritime Southeast Asia. However, Islam did not play a notable role anywhere in mainland Southeast Asia until the 13th century. Instead, widespread and gradual replacement of Hinduism by Theravāda Buddhism reflected a shift to a more personal, introverted spirituality acquired through individual ritual activities and effort.

In addressing the issue of how Islam was introduced into Southeast Asia, historians have elaborated various routes from Arabia to India and then from India to Southeast Asia. Of these, two seem to take prominence: either Arabian traders and scholars who did not live or settle in India spread Islam directly to maritime Southeast Asia, or Arab traders that had been settling in coastal India and Sri Lanka for generations did. Muslim traders from India (Gujarat) and converts of South Asian descent are variously considered to play a major role.

A number of sources propose the South China Sea as another route of Islamic introduction to Southeast Asia. Arguments for this hypothesis include the following:

- Extensive trade between Arabia and China before the 10th century is well documented and has been corroborated by archaeological evidence (see, for example, Belitung shipwreck).
- During the Mongol conquest and the subsequent rule of the Yuan dynasty (1271–1368), hundreds of thousands of Muslims entered China. In Yunnan, Islam was propagated and commonly embraced.
- Kufic grave stones in Champa, modern-day Vietnam, are indices of an early and permanent Islamic community in mainland Southeast Asia.
- The founder of the Demak Sultanate in Java was of Sino-Javanese origin.
- Hui mariner Zheng He proposed ancient Chinese architecture as the stylistic basis for the oldest Javanese mosques during his 15th-century visit to Demak, Banten, and the Red Mosque of Panjunan in Cirebon, West Java.

In 2013, the European Union published the European Commission Forum, which maintains an inclusive attitude on the matter:

Islam spread in Southeast Asia via Muslims of diverse ethnic and cultural origins, from Middle Easterners, Arabs and Persians, to Indians and even Chinese, all of whom followed the great commercial routes of the epoch.

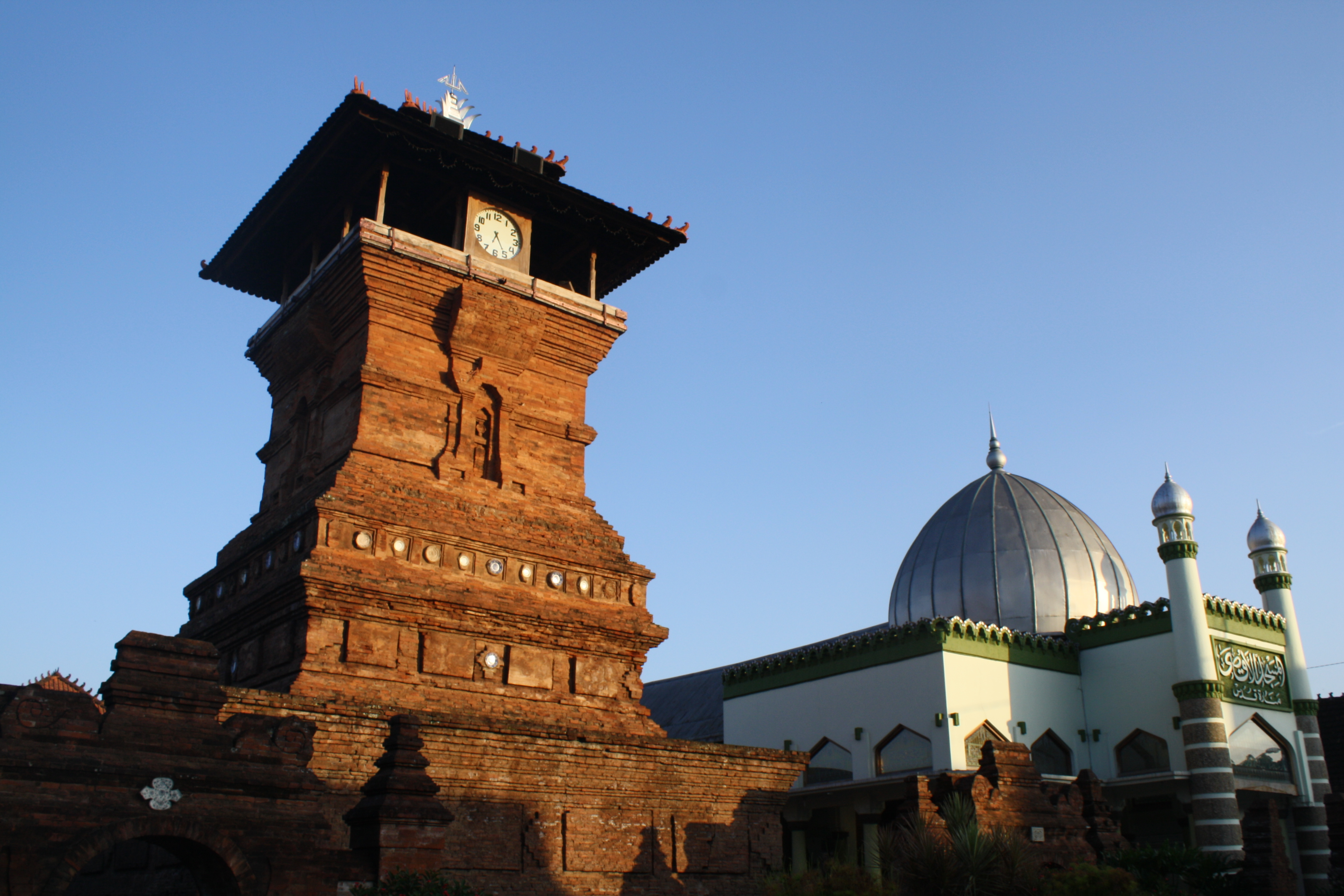
Minaret of the Menara Kudus Mosque, a Javanese Majapahit-style red brick tower, with Mughal-style building in the background, exemplifying the adoption and syncretism of local elements within Islam practiced in the region

Unlike in other Islamic regions, Islam developed in Southeast Asia in a distinctly syncretic manner that allowed the continuation and inclusion of elements and ritual practices of Hinduism, Buddhism and ancient Pan-East Asian animism. Most principalities developed highly distinctive cultures as a result of centuries of active participation in cultural exchange situated at the cross-roads of the Maritime Silk Road coming from across the Indian Ocean in the West and the South China Sea in the East. Cultural and institutional adoption was a creative and selective process, in which foreign elements were incorporated into a local synthesis. Unlike some other "Islamised" regions like North Africa, Iberia, the Middle East and later northern India, Islamic faith in Southeast Asia was not enforced in the wake of territorial conquests, but because of trade routes. In this way, the Islamisation of Southeast Asia is more akin to that of Turkic Central Asia, sub-Saharan Africa, southern India and northwest China.

There are various records of lay Muslim missionaries, scholars and mystics, particularly Sufis, who were active in peacefully proselytizing in Southeast Asia. Java, for example, received Islam by nine men, referred to as the "Wali Sanga" or "Nine Saints," although the historical identity of such people is almost impossible to determine. The foundation of the first Islamic kingdom in Sumatra, the Samudera Pasai Sultanate, took place during the 13th century.

The conversion of the remnants of the Buddhist Srivijaya empire that once controlled trade in much of Southeast Asia, in particular the Strait of Malacca, marked a religious turning point with the conversion of the strait into an Islamic water. With the fall of Srivijaya, the way was open for effective and widespread proselytization and the establishment of Muslim trading centres. Many modern Malays view the Sultanate of Malacca, which existed from the 15th to the early 16th century, as the first political entity of contemporary Malaysia.

The idea of equality before God for the Ummah (the people of God) and a personal religious effort through regular prayer in Islam could have been more appealing than a perceived fatalism in Hinduism at the time. However, Islam also taught obedience and submission, which could have helped guarantee that the social structure of a converted people or political entity saw less fundamental changes.

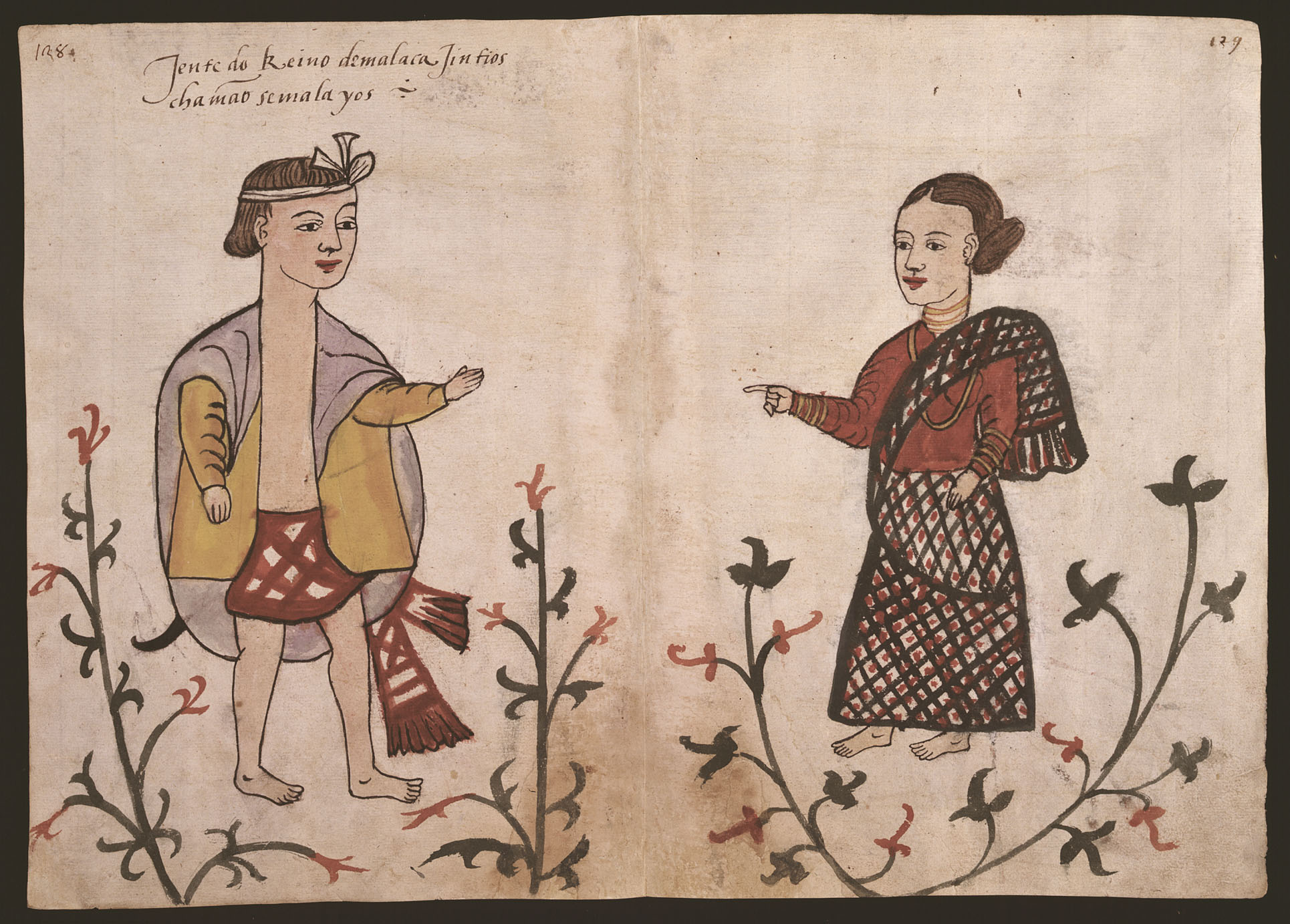
Portuguese illustration of Malays of Malacca, 1540. Malacca sultanate played a significant role in spreading Islamic faith in the region

Islam and its notion of exclusivity and finality is seemingly incompatible with other religions, including the Chinese concept of heavenly harmony and the Son of Heaven as its enforcer. The integration of the traditional East Asian tributary system with China at the centre Muslim Malays and Indonesians exacted a pragmatic approach of cultural Islam in diplomatic relations with China.

=== Chinese treasure voyages ===
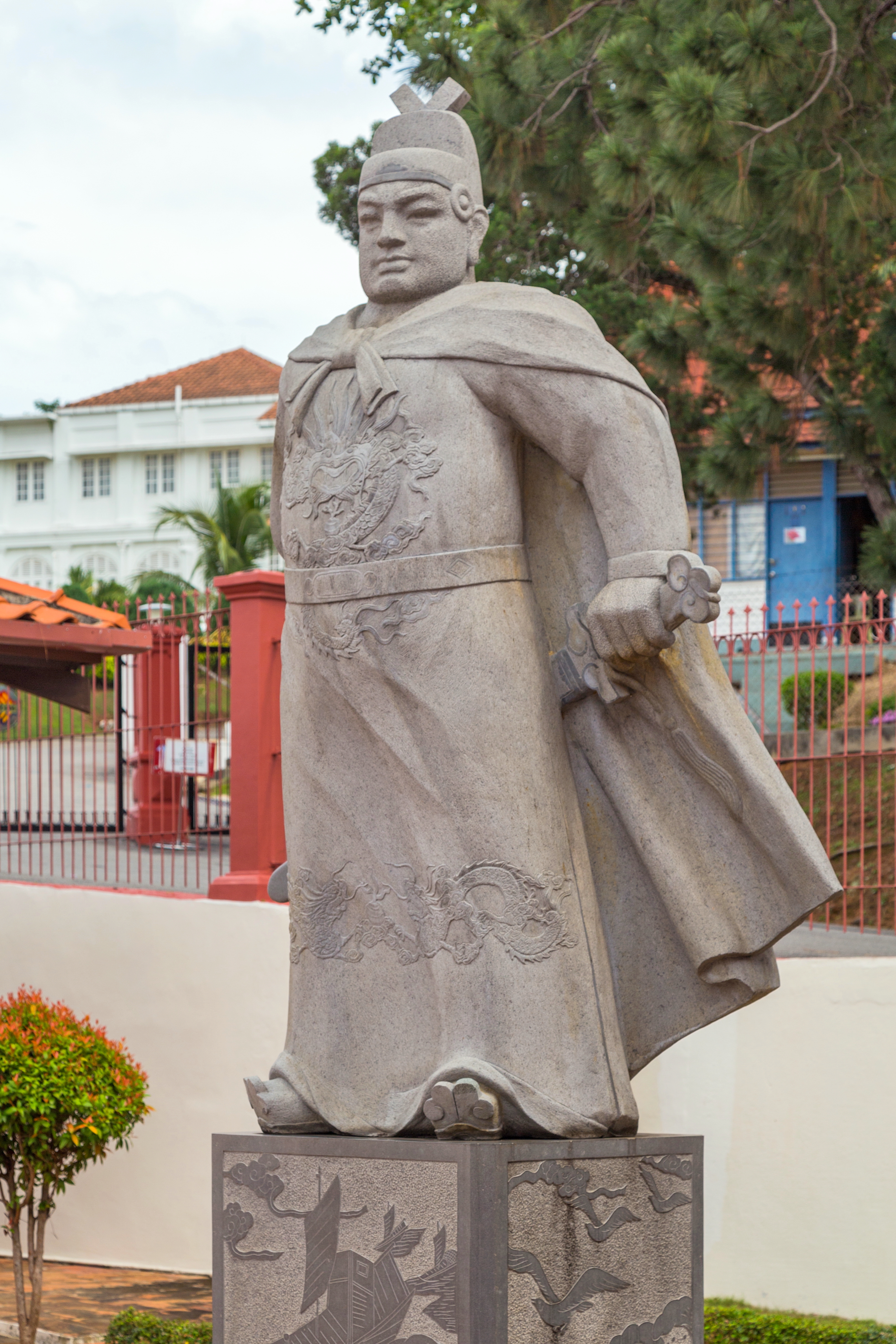
A statue of Ming Admiral Zheng He in Malacca

By the end of the 14th century, Ming China had conquered Yunnan in the South, yet it had lost control of the Silk Road after the fall of the Mongol Yuan dynasty. The ruling Yongle Emperor resolved to focus on the Indian Ocean sea routes, seeking to consolidate the ancient Imperial Tributary System, establish greater diplomatic and military presence, and widen the Chinese sphere of influence. He ordered the construction of a huge trade and representation fleet that, between 1405 and 1433, undertook several voyages into Southeast Asia, India, the Persian Gulf, and as far as East Africa. Under the leadership of Zheng He, hundreds of naval vessels of then unparalleled size, grandeur, and technological advancement and manned by sizeable military contingents, ambassadors, merchants, artists and scholars repeatedly visited major Southeast Asian principalities. The individual fleets engaged in a number of clashes with pirates and occasionally supported various royal contenders. However, pro-expansionist voices at the court in Beijing lost influence after the 1450s, and the voyages were discontinued. The protraction of the ritualistic ceremonies and scanty travels of emissaries in the Tributary System alone was not sufficient to develop firm and lasting Chinese commercial and political influence in the region, especially during the impending onset of highly competitive global trade. During the Chenghua period of the Ming Dynasty, Liu Daxia, who later became the Shangshu of the Ministry of War, hid or burned the archives of Ming treasure voyages.

== Early modern era ==
=== European colonisation ===
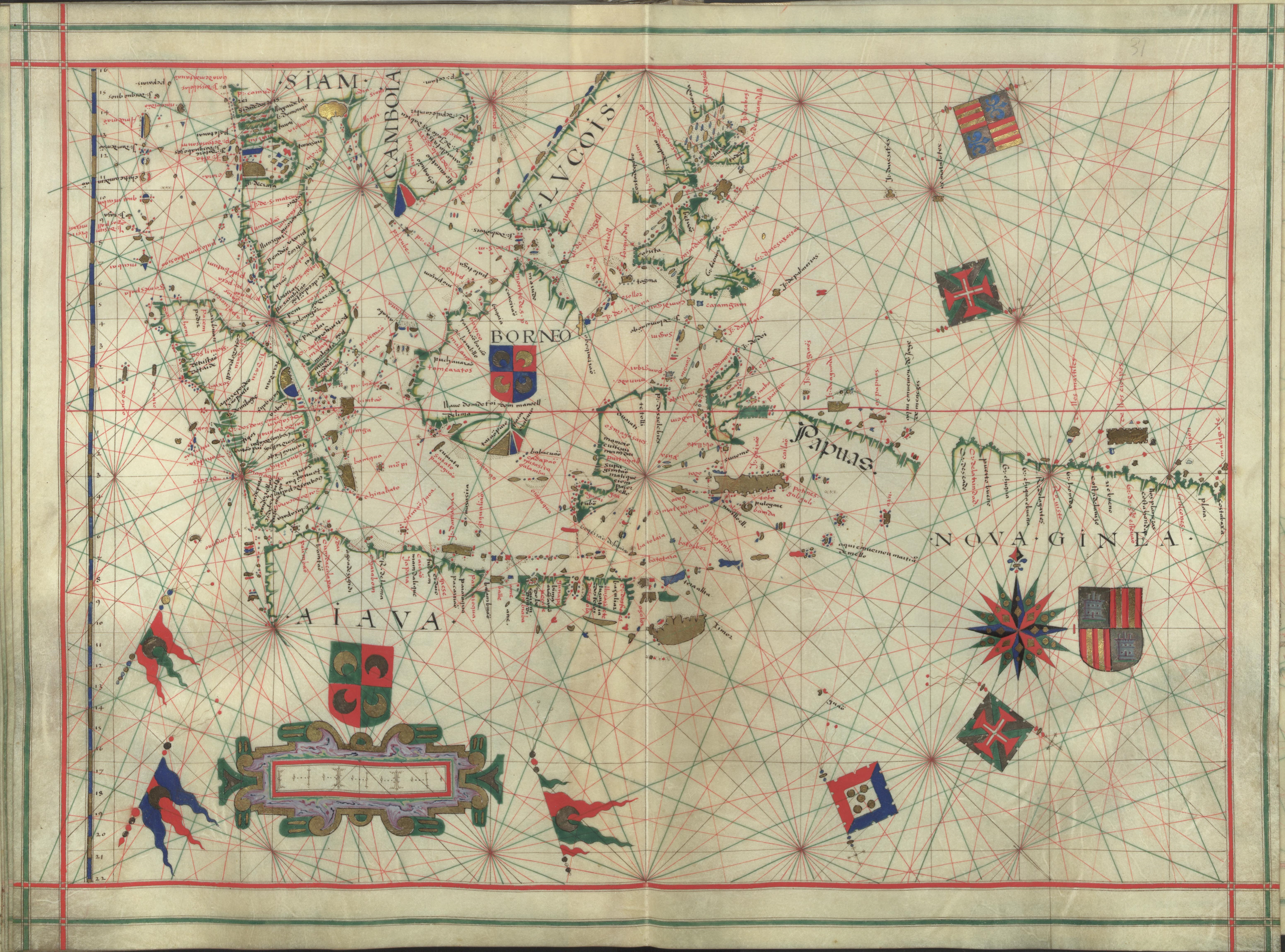
Map of Southeast Asia in 1576 by Fernão Vaz Dourado

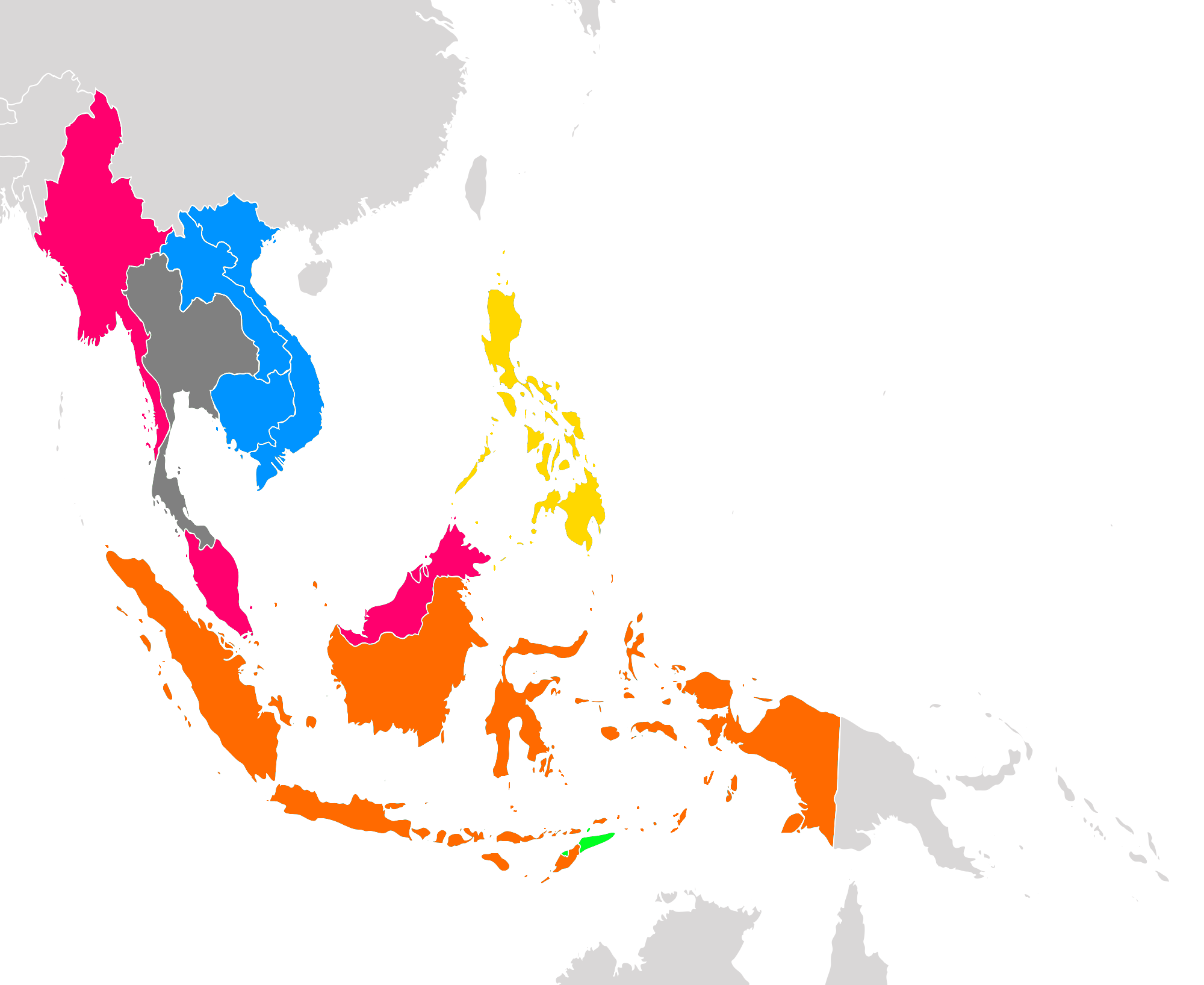
European colonisation of Southeast Asia in the 1800s. Legend: France Netherlands Portugal Spain United Kingdom

The earliest Europeans to have visited Southeast Asia were Marco Polo during the 13th century in the service of Kublai Khan and Niccolò de' Conti during the early 15th century. Regular and momentous voyages only began in the 16th century after the arrival of the Portuguese, who actively sought direct and competitive trade. They were usually accompanied by missionaries, who hoped to promote Christianity.

Portugal was the first European power to establish a bridgehead on the lucrative maritime Southeast Asia trade route, with the conquest of the Sultanate of Malacca in 1511. The Netherlands and Spain followed and soon superseded Portugal as the main European powers in the region. In 1599, Spain began to colonise the Philippines via the Mexico-governed Viceroyalty of New Spain, which the Philippines was territory of. In 1619, acting through the Dutch East India Company, the Dutch took the city of Sunda Kelapa, renamed it Batavia (now Jakarta) as a base for trading and expansion into the other parts of Java and the surrounding territory. In 1641, the Dutch took Malacca from the Portuguese. (Note: For fifty or sixty years, the Portuguese enjoyed the exclusive trade to China and Japan. In 1717, and again in 1732, the Chinese government offered to make Macao the emporium for all foreign trade, and to receive all duties on imports; but, by a strange infatuation, the Portuguese government refused, and its decline is dated from that period. (Roberts, 2007 PDF image 173 p. 166)) Economic opportunities attracted Overseas Chinese to the region in great numbers. In 1775, the Lanfang Republic, possibly the first republic in the region, was established in West Kalimantan, Indonesia, as a tributary state of the Qing Empire; the republic lasted until 1884, when it fell under Dutch occupation as Qing influence waned. (Note: Other experiments in republicanism in adjacent regions were the Japanese Republic of Ezo (1869) and the Republic of Taiwan (1895).)

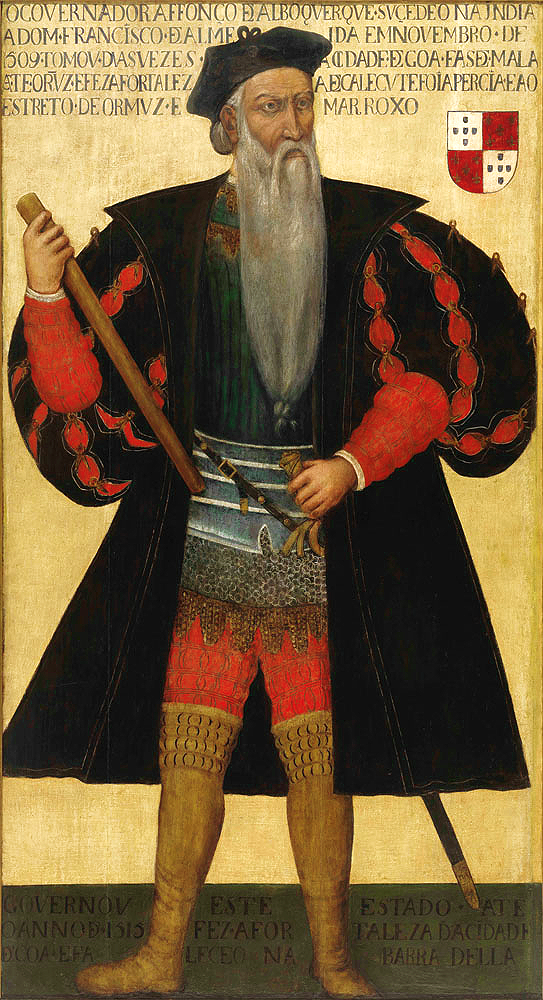
Portrait of Afonso de Albuquerque, the first European to conquer a part of Southeast Asia of Malacca

The British, in the guise of the East India Company led by Josiah Child, had little interest or impact in the region, and were effectively expelled following the Anglo-Siamese War. Britain later turned their attention to the Bay of Bengal following the Peace with France and Spain (1783). During the conflicts, Britain had struggled for naval superiority with the French, and the need of good harbours became evident. Penang Island had been brought to the attention of the Government of India by Francis Light. In 1786, the settlement of George Town was founded at the northeastern tip of Penang Island by Captain Francis Light, under the administration of Sir John Macpherson; this marked the beginning of British expansion into the Malay Peninsula. (Note: Company agent John_Crawfurd used the census taken in 1824 for a statistical analysis of the relative economic prowess of the peoples there, giving special attention to the Chinese: The Chinese amount to 8595, and are landowners, field-labourers, mechanics of almost every description, shopkeepers, and general merchants. They are all from the two provinces of Canton and Fo-kien, and three-fourths of them from the latter. About five-sixths of the whole number are unmarried men, in the prime of life : so that, in fact, the Chinese population, in point of effective labour, may be estimated as equivalent to an ordinary population of above 37,000, and, as will afterwards be shown, to a numerical Malay population of more than 80,000! (Crawfurd image 48. p.30))

The British also temporarily possessed Dutch territories during the Napoleonic Wars; and Spanish areas in the Seven Years' War. In 1819, Stamford Raffles established Singapore as a key trading post for Britain in their rivalry with the Dutch. However, their rivalry cooled in 1824 when an Anglo-Dutch treaty demarcated their respective interests in Southeast Asia. British rule in Burma began with the first Anglo-Burmese War (1824–1826).

Early United States entry into what was then called the East Indies (usually in reference to the Malay Archipelago) was low key. In 1795, a secret voyage for pepper set sail from Salem, Massachusetts on an 18-month voyage that returned with a bulk cargo of pepper, the first to be so imported into the country, which sold at the extraordinary profit of seven hundred per cent. In 1831, the merchantman Friendship of Salem returned to report the ship had been plundered, and the first officer and two crewmen murdered in Sumatra.

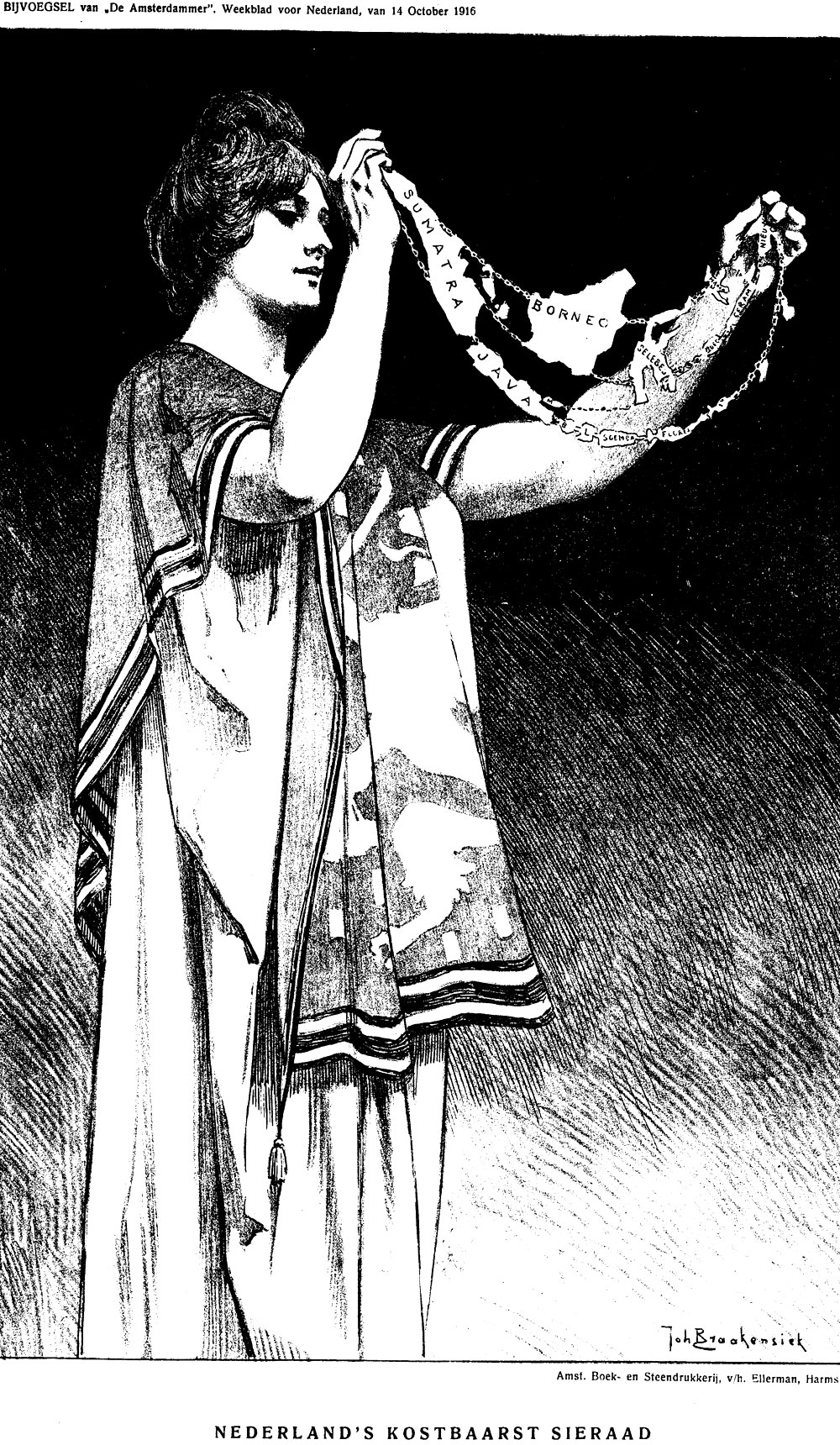
Dutch imperial imagery representing the Dutch East Indies (1916). The text reads "Our most precious jewel."

The Anglo-Dutch Treaty of 1824 obligated the Dutch to ensure the safety of shipping and overland trade in and around Aceh, who accordingly sent the Royal Netherlands East Indies Army on the punitive expedition of 1831. President Andrew Jackson also ordered America's first Sumatran punitive expedition of 1832, which was followed by a punitive expedition in 1838. The Friendship incident thus afforded the Dutch a reason to take over Ache; and Jackson, to dispatch diplomatist Edmund Roberts, who in 1833 secured the Roberts Treaty with Siam. In 1856, during negotiations of the American–Siamese Treaty of 1856, Townsend Harris stated the position of the United States:

The United States does not hold any possessions in the East, nor does it desire any. The form of government forbids the holding of colonies. The United States therefore cannot be an object of jealousy to any Eastern Power. Peaceful commercial relations, which give as well as receive benefits, is what the President wishes to establish with Siam, and such is the object of my mission.

From the end of the 1850s onwards, while the attention of the United States shifted to maintaining their union, the pace of European colonisation shifted to a significantly higher gear. This phenomenon, denoted New Imperialism, saw the conquest of nearly all Southeast Asian territories by the colonial powers. The Dutch East India Company and British East India Company were dissolved by their respective governments, who took over the direct administration of the colonies.

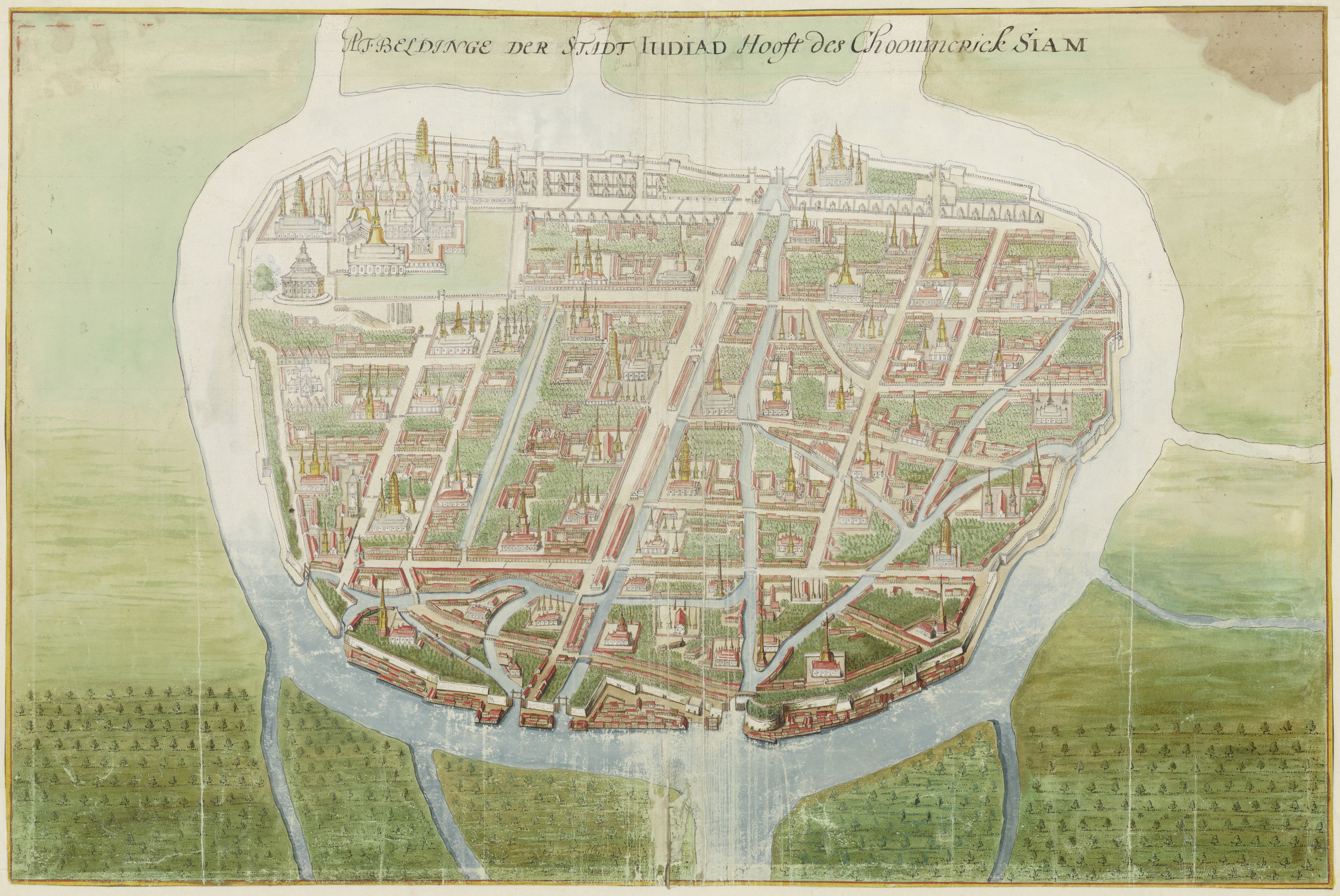
The map of Thai city Ayutthaya made by Johannes Vingboons a Dutch cartographer in 1665. During the European colonialism period in Southeast Asia, only Thailand was spared from the Western rule.

Only Thailand was spared the experience of foreign rule, though Thailand, too, was greatly affected by the power politics of the Western powers. The Monthon reforms of the late 19th Century continuing up till around 1910, imposed a Westernised form of government on the country's partially independent cities called Mueang, such that the country could be said to have successfully colonised itself. Western powers did, however, continue to interfere in both internal and external affairs.

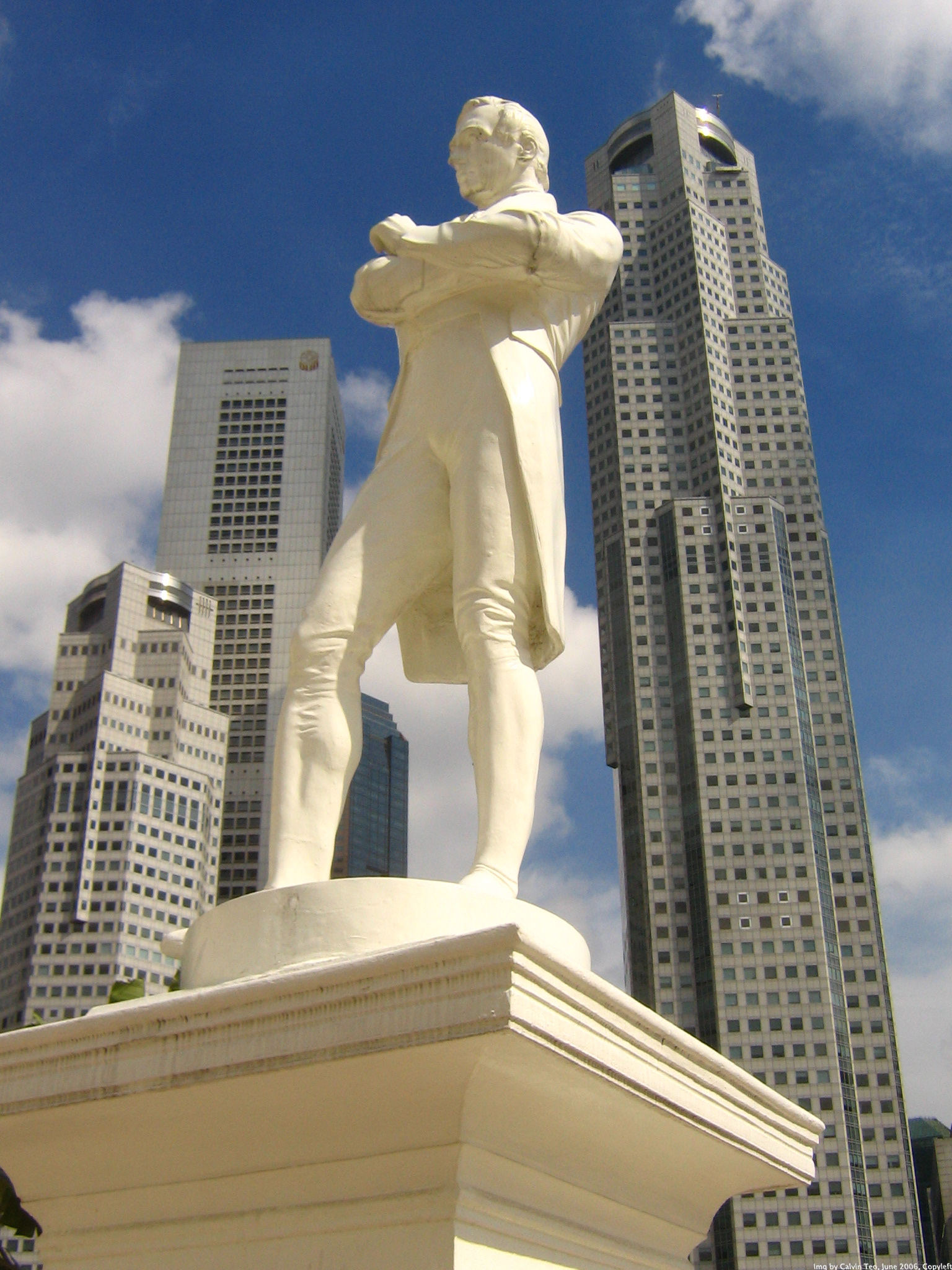
Statue of Stamford Raffles in Singapore. The port city was the centre of British rule in Southeast Asia, and has grown to become one of the world's major trading hubs.

By 1913, the British had occupied Burma, Malaya and the northern Borneo territories, the French occupied Cambodia, Laos, and Vietnam, the Dutch ruled the Netherlands East Indies, while Portugal managed to hold on to Portuguese Timor. In the Philippines, the 1872 Cavite Mutiny was a precursor to the Philippine Revolution (1896–1898). When the Spanish–American War began in Cuba in 1898, Filipino revolutionaries declared Philippine independence and established the First Philippine Republic the following year. In the Treaty of Paris of 1898 that ended the war with Spain, the United States gained the Philippines and other territories; in refusing to recognise the nascent republic, America effectively reversed her position of 1856. This led directly to the Philippine–American War, in which the First Republic was defeated; wars followed with the Republic of Zamboanga, the Republic of Negros and the Republic of Katagalugan, all of which were also defeated.

Colonial rule had had a profound effect on Southeast Asia. While the colonial powers profited much from the region's vast resources and large market, colonial rule did develop the region to a varying extent. Commercial agriculture, mining and an export based economy developed rapidly during this period. The introduction Christianity bought by the colonist also have profound effect in the societal change.

Increased labour demand resulted in mass immigration, especially from British India and China, which brought about massive demographic change. The institutions for a modern nation state like a state bureaucracy, courts of law, print media and to a smaller extent, modern education, sowed the seeds of the fledgling nationalist movements in the colonial territories. In the inter-war years, these nationalist movements grew and often clashed with the colonial authorities when they demanded self-determination.

== 20th-century Southeast Asia ==
=== Japanese invasion and occupations ===
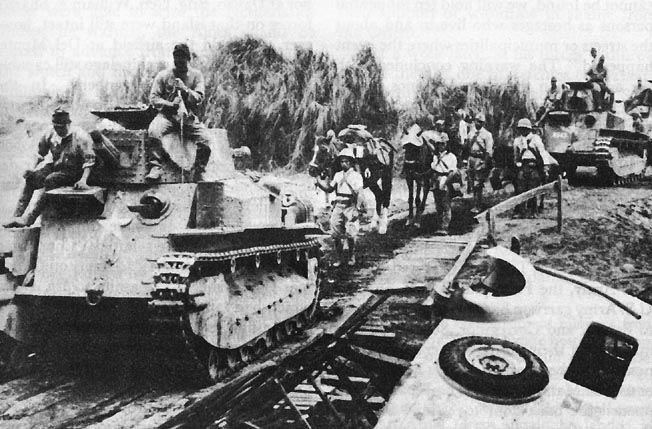
Japanese imperial army entering Manila, January 1942

In September 1940, following the Fall of France and pursuant to the Pacific war goals of Imperial Japan, the Japanese Imperial Army invaded Vichy French Indochina, which ended in the abortive Japanese coup de main in French Indochina of 9 March 1945. On 5 January 1941, Thailand launched the Franco-Thai War, ended on 9 May 1941 by a Japanese-imposed treaty signed in Tokyo. On 7/8 December, Japan's entry into World War II began with the invasion of Thailand, the only invaded country to maintain nominal independence, due to her political and military alliance with the Japanese—on 10 May 1942, her northwestern Payap Army invaded Burma during the Burma Campaign. From 1941 until war's end, Japanese occupied Cambodia, Malaya and the Philippines, which ended in independence movements. Japanese occupation of the Philippines led to the forming of the Second Philippine Republic, formally dissolved in Tokyo on 17 August 1945. Also on 17 August, a proclamation of Indonesian Independence was read at the conclusion of Japanese occupation of the Dutch East Indies since March 1942.

=== Post-war decolonisation ===
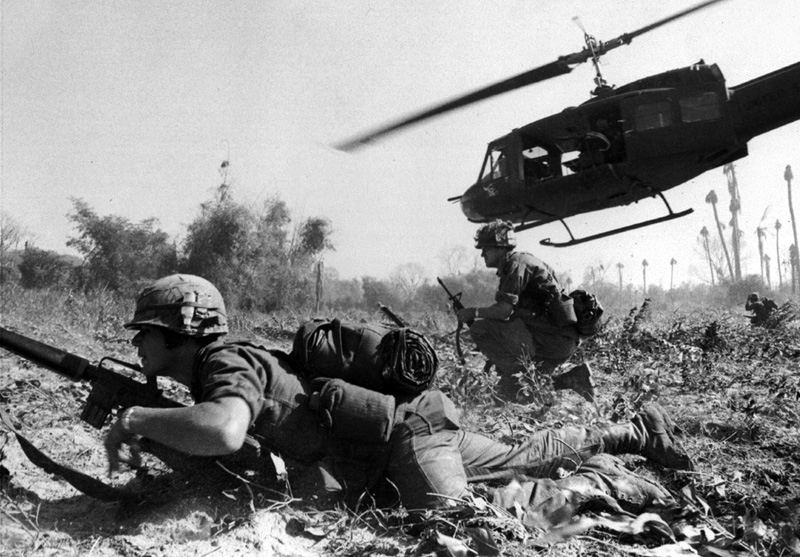
Combat operations at Ia Drang Valley, during Vietnam War, November 1965

With the rejuvenated nationalist movements in wait, the Europeans returned to a very different Southeast Asia after World War II. Indonesia declared independence on 17 August 1945 and subsequently fought a bitter war against the returning Dutch; the Philippines was granted independence by the United States in 1946; Burma secured their independence from Britain in 1948, and the French were driven from Southeast Asia in 1954 after a bitterly fought war (the Indochina War) against communist Vietnamese nationalists. The United Nations provided a forum for nationalism, post-independent self-definition, nation-building and the acquisition of territorial integrity for many newly independent nations.

During the Cold War, countering the threat of communism was a major theme in the decolonisation process. After suppressing the communist insurrection during the Malayan Emergency from 1948 to 1960, Britain granted independence to Malaya and later, Singapore, Sabah and Sarawak in 1957 and 1963 respectively within the framework of the Federation of Malaysia. In one of the most bloody single incidents of violence in Cold War Southeast Asia, General Suharto seized power in Indonesia in 1965 and initiated a massacre of approximately 500,000 alleged members of the Communist Party of Indonesia (PKI).

After French defeat in Điện Biên Phủ, France granted complete independence to the anti-communist State of Vietnam on 4 June 1954 before the communists took over the North in July. North Vietnamese attempts to conquer South Vietnam resulted in the Vietnam War. The conflict spread to Laos and Cambodia and heavy intervention from the United States. By the war's end in 1975, all these countries were controlled by communist parties. After the communist victory, two wars between communist states—the Cambodian–Vietnamese War of 1975–89 and the Sino-Vietnamese War of 1979—were fought in the region. The victory of the Khmer Rouge in Cambodia resulted in the Cambodian genocide.

In 1975, Portuguese rule ended in East Timor. However, independence was short-lived as Indonesia annexed the territory soon after. However, after more than 20 years of fighting Indonesia, East Timor won its independence and was recognised by the UN in 2002. Finally, Britain ended its protectorate of the Sultanate of Brunei in 1984, marking the end of European rule in Southeast Asia.

== Contemporary Southeast Asia ==
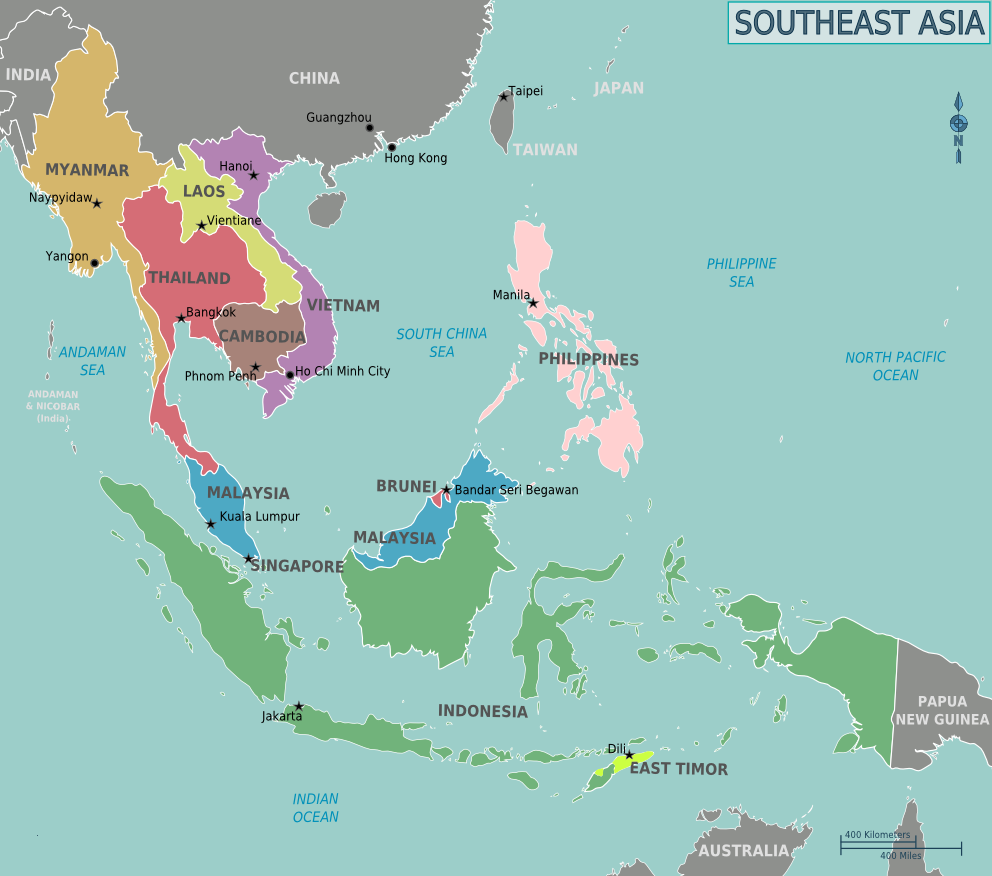
Contemporary political map of Southeast Asia

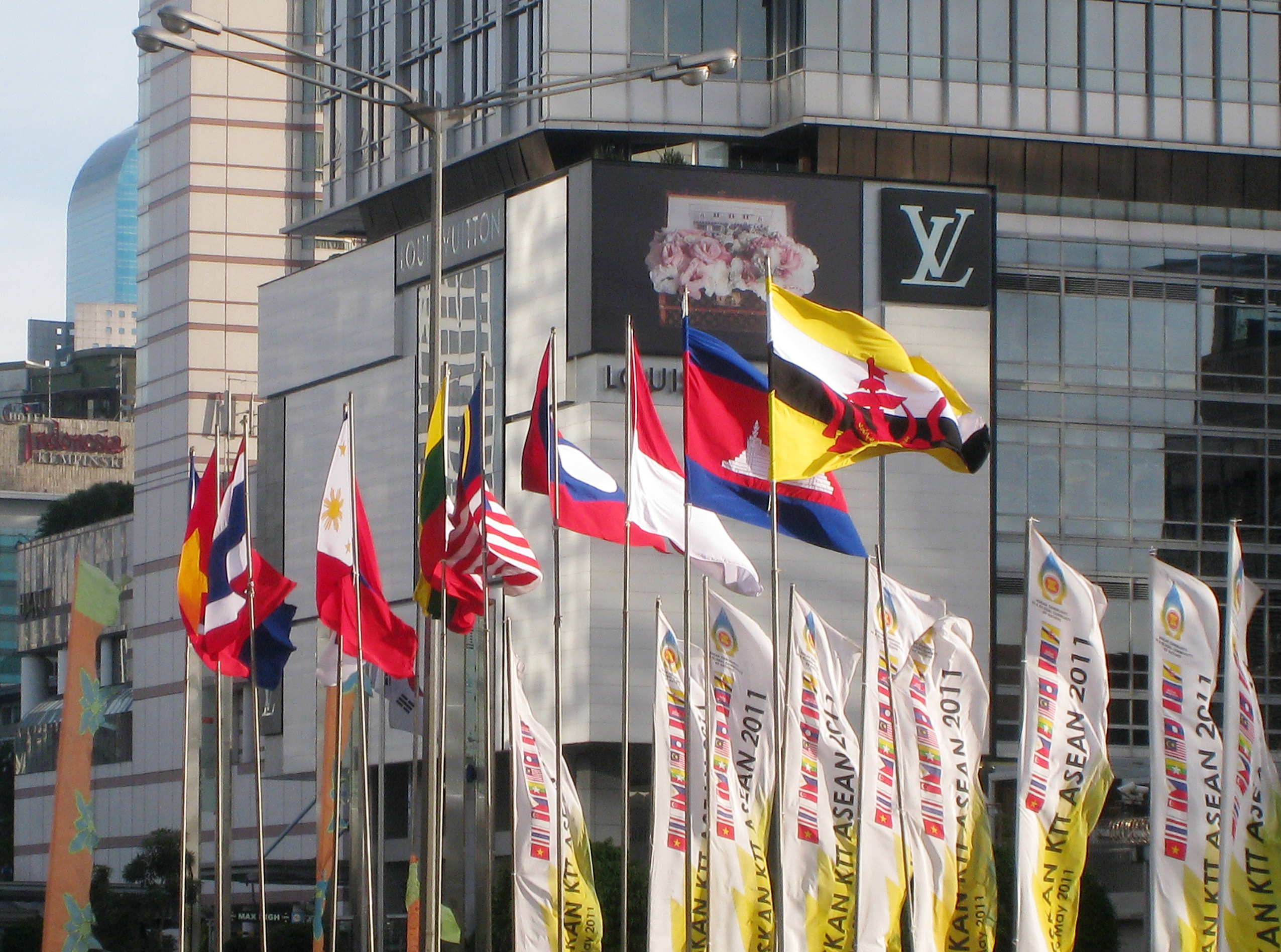
ASEAN members' flags in Jakarta

Modern Southeast Asia has been characterised by high economic growth by most countries and closer regional integration. Indonesia, Malaysia, the Philippines, Singapore, and Thailand have traditionally experienced high growth and are commonly recognised as the more developed countries of the region. As of late, Vietnam too had been experiencing an economic boom. However, Myanmar, Cambodia, Laos, and the newly independent Timor-Leste (aka East Timor) are still lagging economically.

On 8 August 1967, the Association of Southeast Asian Nations (ASEAN) was founded by Thailand, Indonesia, Malaysia, Singapore and the Philippines. Since Cambodian admission into the union in 1999, East Timor is the only Southeast Asian country that is not part of ASEAN, although plans are under way for eventual membership. The association aims to enhance co-operation among Southeast Asian community. ASEAN Free Trade Area has been established to encourage greater trade among ASEAN members. ASEAN has also been a front runner in greater integration of Asia-Pacific region through East Asia Summits.

== See also ==
- Buddhism in Southeast Asia
- Hinduism in Southeast Asia
- Islam in Southeast Asia
- Greater India
- Two layer hypothesis
- Spratly Islands
- History of ASEAN
- History of Brunei
- History of Cambodia
- History of Timor-Leste (i.e. of East Timor)
- History of Indonesia
- History of Laos
- History of Malaysia
- History of Myanmar
- History of the Philippines
- History of Singapore
- History of Thailand
- History of Vietnam
- History of Asia
- Post - 1500 Southeast Asia Archaeology
