= Red Mosque of Panjunan =

Mosque in Cirebon, West Java, Indonesia

- Masjid Merah Panjunan
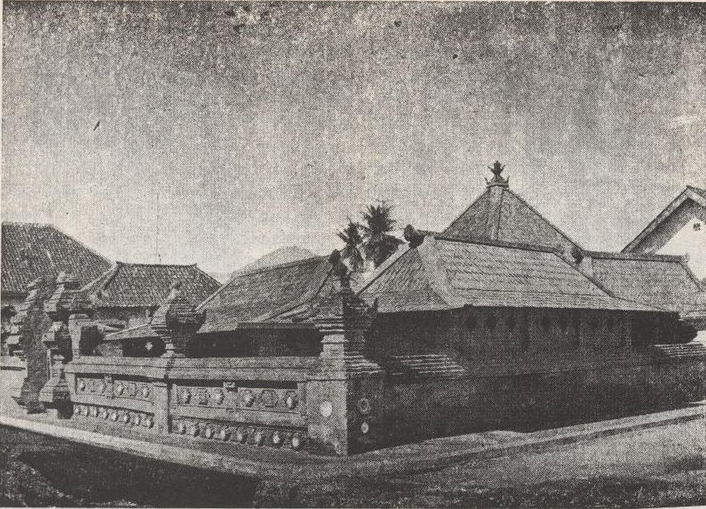

Religion
- Affiliation: Islam
- Branch/tradition: Sunni

Location
- Location: Panjunan, Cirebon Regency, West Java, Indonesia
- Interactive map of Red Mosque of Panjunan
- Coordinates: 6.717479°S 108.566065°E

Architecture
- Type: Mosque
- Style: Javanese
- Completed: 1480

The Red Mosque of Panjunan (Indonesian Masjid Merah Panjunan, Javanese Masjid Abang) is a Javanese mosque located in the village of Panjunan, Cirebon Regency, West Java, Indonesia. This 15th-century mosque with its Hindu architecture typical of Java is one of the oldest mosques in Indonesia.

== History ==
The Mosque of Panjunan was first established in 1480 by Syarif Abdurrahman, also known as Pangeran Panjunan ("The Prince of Panjunan"). Syarif Abdurrahman was an Arab who led a group of immigrants from Baghdad. Later, Syarif Abdurrahman became a student of Sunan Gunung Jati, one of the Wali Songo, or nine saints of Islam revered in Indonesia. The Mosque of Panjunan was instrumental in the Islamization of Cirebon.

In the beginning, the Red Mosque of Panjunan was named al-Athya Musalla. Because of its surrounding red brick perimeter wall, the mosque was also known as the Red Mosque or Masjid Abang. In the beginning, the mosque was a small Musalla with an area of 40 square metres (430 sq ft). The mosque was established in the neighborhood of Panjunan which at the time of its construction was a junction for travelers near the town of Cirebon. The village of Panjunan where the mosque is located is known for its earthenware pottery.

== Architecture ==
The older musalla building had a total area of 40 square metres (430 sq ft). After it was expanded into a mosque, the mosque has the size of 150 square metres (1,600 sq ft). The architecture of the Mosque of Panjunan is a combination of Hindu, Chinese, and Islamic culture. The perimeter of the mosque looks more like an Indonesian Hindu temple found in Bali. The perimeter is constructed out of red bricks, with a split gate candi bentar marking the main entrance into the mosque. The candi bentar is a relic which originate from the 13th-14th century Hindu period of Singhasari and Majapahit.

The mosque is relatively small in both size and proportion. The door is short, forcing people to bow while entering the building. The building is topped with a pyramidal roof known as the tajug. In Javanese architecture, the tajug roof type is only used for sacred buildings e.g. Hindu temples or mosques. The layout of the mosque is rectangular, with 12 posts supporting the tajug roof. The wall which encloses the main room of the mosque does not have any structural function; the entire roof was supported by the posts, typical of Javanese architecture.

The mihrab of the mosque and a couple of Arabic writings on the wall are among the few elements which indicate that the building is a mosque. Chinese plate ceramics are attached to the perimeter wall. It is said that the Chinese plate ceramics were wedding gifts when Sunan Gunung Jati married to Ong Tien Nio. The mihrab of the mosque is decorated with ceramics decoration. The mihrab is shaped like the paduraksa, another influence from earlier Hindu period. Reliefs showing a candi bentar and paduraksa have been discovered in 13th-century Candi Jago in East Java. In the Javanese Hindu architecture, the paduraksa marks the sacred-most area of a temple. The Mosque of Panjunan contains no minbar, because the mosque is only used for everyday use. The mosque is not used for Friday Prayer or for the annual Eid prayers.

== Cited works ==
- Abdul Hakim (2011). "Akulturasi Budaya Bangunan Masjid Tua Cirebon". Ṣuḥuf (in Indonesian). 4 (2).
- Davison, Julian (2003). Balinese architecture. Singapore: Tuttle Publishing. ISBN 9780794600716.
- Laely Wijaya (2008). Masjid Merah Panjunan Cirebon (Kajian Histori-Arkeologis). Yogyakarta: UIN Sunan Kalijaga.
- Mutiara, Dian Anditya (2010). "Masjid Merah Panjunan, Masjid dari Lima Abad Silam". Kompas.com (in Indonesian). Kompas Cyber Media.
