= Hendra Bambang Wisanggeni Soerjaatmadja =

18th sultan of Banten

Sultan Syarif Muhammad ash-Shafiuddin
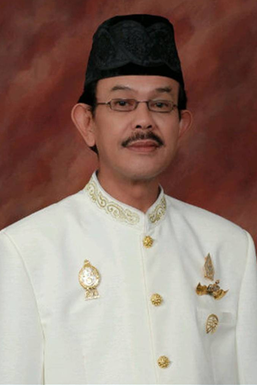
- Sultan Syarif Muhammad ash-Shafiuddin

18th Sultan of Banten
- Reign: 2016–present
- Coronation: 11 December 2016
- Predecessor: Maulana Muhammad Shafiuddin of Banten
- Born: Ratu Bagus Hendra Bambang Wisanggeni Soerjaatmadja; 31 August 1954 (age 71); Palembang, South Sumatra
- Spouse: Nina Arifai Soerjaatmadja (m. 1981)
- Issue: Ratu Ayu Primiputri Rakhmania Soerjaatmadja; Ratu Bagus Akhmatindra Adisatria Rachman Soerjaatmadja; Ratu Bagus Raditya Hafiz Bangsawan Soerjaatmadja; Ratu Bagus Muhammad Arief Abimanyu Soerjaatmadja
Names
- Ratu Bagus Hendra Bambang Wisanggeni Soerjaatmadja
Regnal name
- Syarif Muhammad ash-Shafiuddin Azmatkhan al-Husaini
- House: Azmatkhan
- Father: Ratu Bagus Abdul Mughni Soerjaatmadja
- Mother: Soepiati Soerjaatmadja
- Religion: Sunni Islam
- Alma mater: University of Indonesia; University of Oxford

Ratu Bagus Hendra Bambang Wisanggeni Soerjaatmadja, M.B.A. (EYD: Ratu Bagus Hendra Bambang Wisanggeni Suryaatmaja; born 31 August 1954) is the 18th sultan of Banten who was crowned on December 11, 2016 with the title of Sultan Syarif Muhammad ash-Shafiuddin Azmatkhan al-Husaini.

Soerjaatmadja was officially crowned as Sultan who led Bantenese people on custom and culture during the celebration of Mawlid at the Great Mosque of Banten, Serang. Ahmad Muhtadi Dimyathi, an influential cleric in Banten is one of the figures who confirmed Soerjaatmadja as sultan.

== Biography ==
=== Early life ===
Soerjaatmadja was born in Plaju sub-district, Palembang, South Sumatera from Bantenese couple named Ratu Bagus Abdul Mughni Soerjaatmadja and Soepiati Soeraatmadja.

Abdul Mughni was the heir of the Sultanate of Banten, he was the son of Ratu Bagus Marjono Soerjaatmadja bin Pangeran Timur Soerjaatmadja bin Sultan Maulana Muhammad Shafiuddin. Maulana Muhammad Shafiuddin was the last sultan of Banten who ruled from 1809 to 1813. After the Banten Sultanate was abolished by the Dutch, he and his descendants were later exiled to Surabaya.

Pengadilan Agama (Indonesian: the Religious Courts) of Serang through Surat Penetapan Ahli Waris (Indonesian: the Letter of Determination of the Heirs) numbered 0316 / PDT.P / 2016 / PA.SRG dated 22 September 2016 has decided that Soerjaatmadja was true the son of Ratu Bagus Abdul Mughni Soerjaatmadja who was descended from the last sultan of Banten Maulana Muhammad Shafiuddin, and as the owner of the strongest blood relation who has the right of inheritance as the successor of the Sultanate of Banten.

Soerjaatmadja is the 10th descendant of Sultan Ageng Tirtayasa of Banten through Abu Nasr Abdul Kahhar, and the 15th descendant of Sultan Maulana Hasanuddin of Banten, the first sultan of Banten.

=== Education ===
- Bachelor's degree: Faculty of Economics and Business, University of Indonesia (graduated in 1979)
- Master's degree: University of Oxford (graduated with a Master of Business Administration)

=== Personal life ===
In 1981, Soerjaatmadja married a dentist named Nina Arifai. Nina is a retired lecturer at the Faculty of Dentistry, University of Indonesia. From the marriage they have four children: Ratu Ayu Primiputri Rakhmania Soerjaatmadja (Ratu Gusti), Ratu Bagus Akhmatindra Adisatria Rachman Soerjaatmadja (Prince Gusti), Ratu Bagus Raditya Hafiz Bangsawan Soerjaatmadja (Prince Adipati), and Ratu Bagus Muhammad Arief Abimanyu Soerjaatmadja (Prince Anom).

== Career and activity ==
=== 2010 ===
On June 12, 2010, Forum Silaturahmi Keraton Se-Nusantara under the leadership of KGPHPA. Tedjowulan from Surakarta Sunanate acknowledged Soerjaatmadja as the official representative of the Sultanate of Banten. In the same year, Kyai Hajji Tubagus Fathul Adzim son of Tubagus Ahmad Chatib al-Bantani handed over the mandate given by Ratu Bagus Aryo Marjono Soerjaatmadja related to the management of the Great Mosque of Banten and the Tomb of Sultan Banten in Old Banten to Soerjaatmadja as the heir of the Sultanate of Banten and is the grandson of Aryo Marjono.

Related to the handover of the mandate by Tubagus Fathul Adzim to Soerjaatmadja, historical records mention that in the early days of Indonesian Independence around 1947 there was a meeting between the heirs of the Sultanate of Banten (Ratu Bagus Aryo Marjono Soerjaatmadja), President of Indonesia (Sukarno), Sultan of Yogyakarta (Hamengkubuwono IX), and Resident of Banten (Tubagus Ahmad Chatib al-Bantani). At the meeting, Sukarno invited the heir to the throne of Banten Sultanate to lead the Banten area back, but the heir to the throne due to his responsibilities as Director of BRI (now the Governor of Bank Indonesia) entrusted Banten's leadership including the guarding and maintenance of the big family asset of Banten Sultanate to Tubagus Ahmad Chatib al-Bantani as Resident of Banten, until the time when child or grandson Marjono return to Banten.

=== 2013 ===
In 2013, Soerjaatmadja genealogy as the heir of the Sultanate of Banten recognized and endorsed by Rabithah Azmatkhan as research institute Walisongo descendants family.

In December 2013, Soerjaatmadja was invited by Joko Widodo as Governor of Jakarta to represent the Sultanate of Banten in the World Royal Heritage event at National Monument, Jakarta.

Throughout the year 2013 - 2015, Soerjaatmadja also frequent visits to the clerics of Banten such as Abuya Ahmad Muhtadi Dimyathi Cidahu, Abuya Uci Turtusi Cilongok, Abuya Munfasir Padarincang, Kyai Hajji Yusuf Mubarok Cinangka, Kyai Hajji Sukanta Labuan, Kyai Hajji Thobari Syadzili Tangerang, Kyai Hajji Lukman Harun Cilegon, and others.

=== 2014 ===
In 2014, Soerjaatmadja was invited as Sultan of Banten by the Sultanate of Kelantan in Malaysia, it makes the stronger recognition of him as the official heir of the Sultanate of Banten which began coming from the international community.

=== 2015 ===
On February 3, 2015, Soerjaatmadja was recognized by international clerics, such as from Turkey (Sheikh Fadhil al-Jailani, descendant of Sheikh Abdul-Qadir Gilani), Syria, Kelantan-Malaysia and Pattani-Thailand, as the 18th Sultan of Banten with the title of Sultan Syarif Muhammad as-Shafiuddin Azmatkhan al-Husaini. He was also given a testament and mandate as the heir of the Sultanate who led culturally to strengthen the bond with the community, local government, and the Bantenese ulama.

=== 2016 ===
Soerajaatmadja was officially crowned as the 18th Sultan of Banten with the title of Sultan Syarif Muhammad as-Shafiuddin during the celebration of the Prophet Muhammad's Mawlid at the Great Mosque of Banten, Serang, Banten, on Sunday 11 December 2016.

=== As the Sultan of Banten ===
==== Pros and cons ====
A series of pros and cons occurred after the establishment of Soerjaatmadja as the 18th Sultan of Banten on December 11, 2016 in Old Banten.

The Religious Courts of Serang spoke about the pros and cons of the inauguration. The court declared not to establish the title of 18th Sultan of Banten, but only set Soerjaatmadja as the heir of the descendants of the Sultanate of Banten. The Decree of the Religious Courts of Serang was numbered 0316 / PDT.P / 2016 / PA.SRG dated 22 September 2016 on the Stipulation of the Heirs.

Meanwhile, Soerjaatmadja said that the decision of the Religious Courts of Serang has established himself as the heir of the Sultanate of Banten so entitled to the title of Sultan of Banten. He invited the parties who objected to his enthronement as the 18th Sultan of Banten to file a lawsuit. As the Sultan of Banten, he intends to embrace all parties, including those who reject the coronation himself as the Sultan of Banten. Soerjaatmadja wants to invite all to work together to rebuild the glory of the Sultanate of Banten.

Meanwhile, the Indonesian Ulema Council of Banten Province assessed the horizontal conflict that occurred on the coronation of the 18th Sultan of Banten between Soerjaatmadja as the heir of the Sultanate with the Kenadziran Kesultanan Banten was a family affair and must be resolved by way of kinship.

Hendra Bambang Wisanggeni Soerjaatmadja Azmatkhan Dynasty of Banten Born: 31 August 1954
Regnal titles
Preceded by Maulana Muhammad Shafiuddin of Banten	Sultan of Banten; 2016-present	Incumbent
