= Banten invasions of Pajajaran =

16th-century conflict in West Java

- Part of Islamization of Indonesia
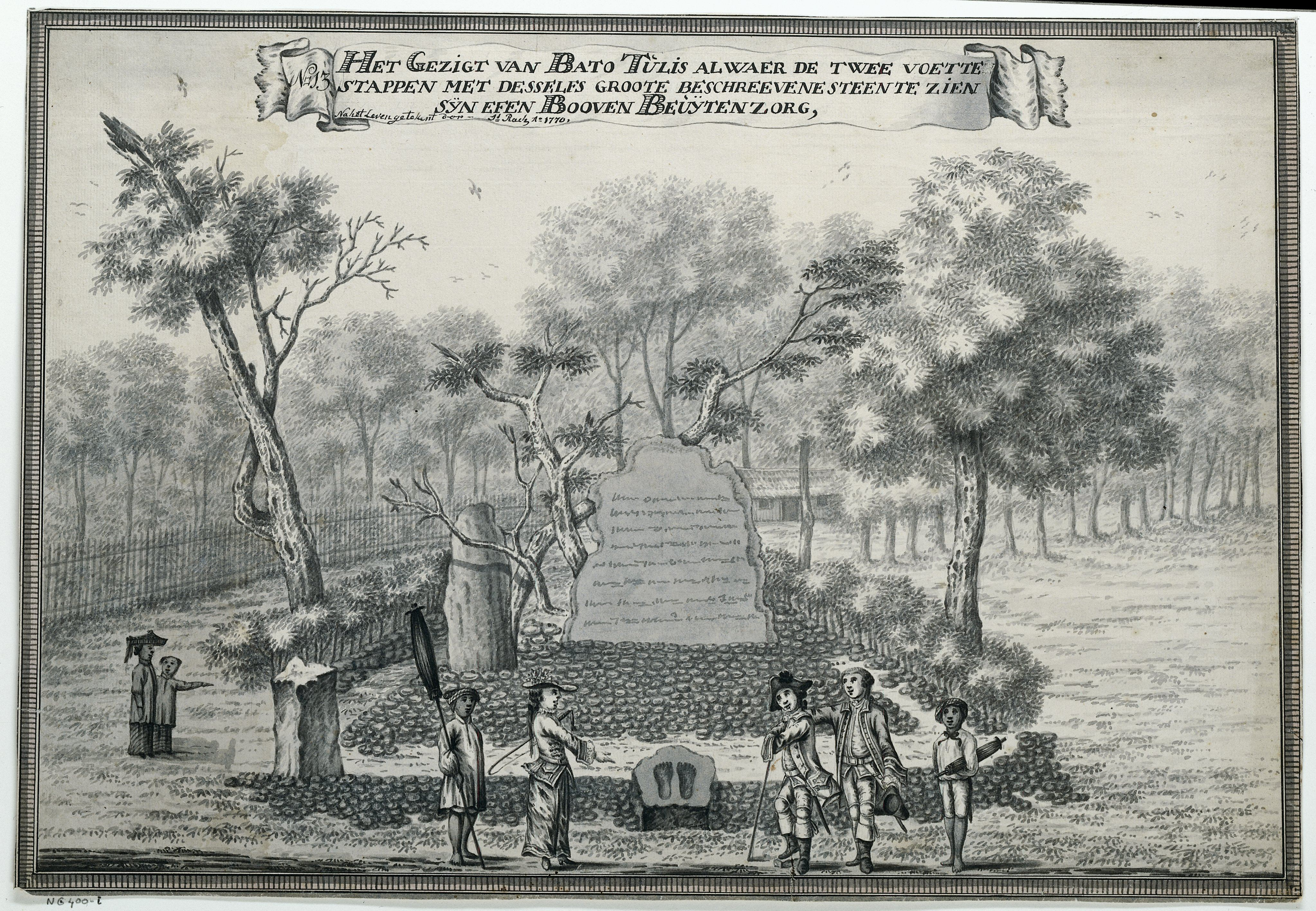
- Depiction of Batu Tulis of Buitenzorg, 1770.
Date	1527–1579
Location	West Java
Result	Bantenese victory; Spread of Islam in Tatar Sunda
Territorial changes	Fall of the Sunda Kingdom; former territories of Sunda kingdom absorbed into Banten kingdom

Belligerents
(Banten Sultanate) Kingdom of Banten; Supported by: Demak Sultanate; Cirebon Sultanate	Sunda Kingdom

Commanders and leaders
(Banten Sultanate) Maulana Yusuf (Banten Sultanate) Maulana Hasanuddin	Dewata †; Nilakendra (MIA); Raga Mulya †; Tohaan Sarendet †; Tohaan Sangiang †

}}

Banten invasions of Pajajaran, also known as the conquest of Pajajaran, was a military campaign launched by Banten Sultanate to conquer Sunda Kingdom and spread Islam influences in West Java. The invasions resulted in Bantenese victory. Banten forces captured most of the Sundanese inscription, the famous one is Batutulis inscription. The invasions marked the beginning of the spread of Islam in West Java.

== Background ==
In 1526, the Demak Sultanate and Sultanate of Cirebon launched military conquest on Banten Girang. The main objective of the conquest was to start the Islamization on Banten. With the weakened of the Sunda Kingdom influences in Banten and the low morale of Sunda forces, the Demak–Cirebon joint forces stormed the port of Banten. After capturing the port, the Demak-Cirebon forces started to invade Banten Girang and succeeded in killing the King of Sunda and establishing the new Sultanate called Banten Sultanate with the Maulana Hasanuddin, the son of Sunan Gunungjati, as their first Sultan.

In 1527, the Banten Sultanate planned the invasions of the Sunda Kingdom. The main objective of the invasion was to start the Islamization the West Java and also to end the Hindu–Buddha rule on West Java. With an weakened and the internal conflict of Sunda Kingdom, the Banten Sultanate started their invasions.

== Invasions ==
The invasions were divided into three waves. However on the first wave of this invasions, the Banten forces quickly attacked Bubat, the main port of Sunda Kingdom. After attacking the Bubat, the Banten forces were able to march through half of Pajajaran territories. However with the defense of Sundanese forces, the Banten forces retreated to Bubat.

In the second phase of invasions, the Banten forces managed to crush the Pajajaran defenses at Dayeuh Pakuan and crossed through Pajajaran. After they arrived to Pajajaran, they managed to burn the royal palace of Sunda Kingdom. Many of the royal family were killed or decided to retreat to other places.

After the destruction of the royal palace of Sunda Kingdom, the Banten forces continued their invasions again. In the third phase of invasions, the Banten forces managed to plunder and sack the Pakuan Pajajaran. After the sacking of Pajajaran, the Banten forces quickly attacked Pulosari, Priangan, and Pandeglang. Absorbing the territories to themselves, after the invasions, the Sunda Kingdom was annexed by Banten Sultanate.

== Aftermath ==
After the invasions, the Sunda kingdom was completely destroyed by the Banten Sultanate. Sundanese old town or buildings were burned into the ground. In addition, Banten captured and stole many Sundanese inscriptions, such as Batutulis inscription. After the invasions, the Banten Sultanate started the Islamization on Tatar Sunda.

== Citations ==
- Ferry, Taufiq (2020). Hitam Putih Pajajaran:Dari Kejayaan Hingga Keruntuhan Kerajaan Pajajaran. Araska Publisher. ISBN 9786237537328.
