= List of sultans of Banten =

List of sultans of the Banten Sultanate

Sultan of Banten
- Imperial
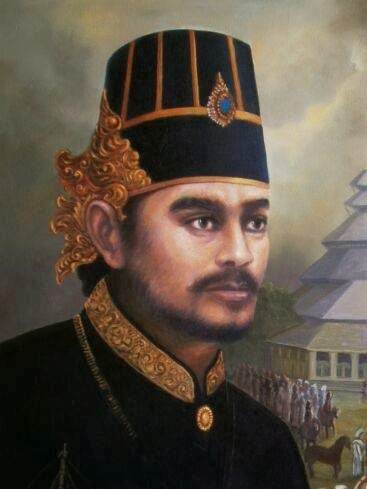
- Maulana Hasanuddin, first sultan (r. 1552–1570)

Details
- First monarch: Sultan Maulana Hasanuddin
- Last monarch: Muhammad ibn Muhammad Muhyiddin Zainussalihin
- Formed: 1552
- Abolished: 1813
- Residence: Surasowan Palace
- Appointer: Hereditary
- Pretender: Sultan Syarif Muhammad ash-Shafiuddin

The sultan of Banten was the ruler of Banten Sultanate in the province of Banten, Indonesia, which had triumphed at the western tip of Java island. The sultanate was founded by Maulana Hasanuddin of Banten who reigned between 1552 and 1570. It was one of the most important Muslim dynasties in pre-colonial Indonesia that made contact with the Europeans.

== List of sultans of Banten ==
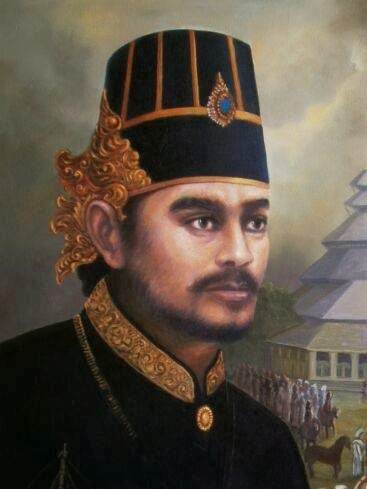
Maulana Hasanuddin, first ruler of Banten Sultanate

- Syarif Hidayatullah or Sunan Gunung Jati from Sultanate of Cirebon
1. Sultan Maulana Hasanuddin or Prince Sabakinking 1552–1570
2. Sultan Maulana Yusuf or Prince Pasareyan 1570–1585
3. Sultan Maulana Muhammad or Prince Sedangrana 1585–1596
4. Sultan Abu al-Mafakhir Mahmud Abdulkadir or Pangeran Ratu 1596–1647
5. Sultan Abu al-Ma'ali Ahmad 1647–1651
6. Sultan Abu al-Fath Abdul Fattah or Sultan Ageng Tirtayasa 1651–1683
7. Sultan Abu Nashar Abdul Qahar or Sultan Haji 1683–1687
8. Sultan Abu Fadhl Muhammad Yahya 1687–1690
9. Sultan Abu al-Mahasin Muhammad Zainul Abidin 1690–1733
10. Sultan Abu al-Fathi Muhammad Syifa Zainul Arifin 1733–1750
  1. Sultan Syarifuddin Ratu Wakil, in effect Ratu Syarifah Fatimah 1750–1752
11. Sultan Abu al-Ma'ali Muhammad Wasi Zainal Alimin or Pangeran Arya Adisantika 1752–1753
12. Sultan Arif Zainul Asyiqin al-Qadiri 1753–1773
13. Sultan Abu al-Mafakhir Muhammad Aliuddin 1773–1799
14. Sultan Abu al-Fath Muhammad Muhyiddin Zainussalihin 1799–1801
15. Sultan Abu al-Nashar Muhammad Ishaq Zainulmutaqin 1801–1802
  1. Caretaker Sultan Wakil Pangeran Natawijaya 1802–1803
16. Sultan Abu al-Mafakhir Muhammad Aliyuddin II 1803–1808
  1. Caretaker Sultan Wakil Pangeran Suramenggala 1808–1809
17. Sultan Muhammad ibn Muhammad Muhyiddin Zainussalihin 1809–1813
18. Sultan Syarif Muhammad ash-Shafiuddin or Ratu Bagus Hendra Bambang Wisanggeni Soerjaatmadja 2016–current

== Family tree ==
Family tree of Banten Sultans

Gunung Jati; Cirebon and Banten r. 1526-1552
Hasanuddin^{(1)} r. 1552-1570
Yusuf^{(2)} r. 1570-1585
Muhammad^{(3)} r. 1585-1596
Mahmud; Abdulkadir^{(4)} r. 1596-1647
Ahmad^{(5)} r. 1647-1651
Ageng; Tirtayasa^{(6)} r. 1651-1683
Abdulkahhar^{(7)} r. 1683-1687
Muhammad; Yahya^{(8)} r. 1687-1690 | Muhammad; Zainulabidin^{(9)} r. 1690-1733
Muhammad; Syifa; Zainularifin^{(10)} r. 1733-1750 | Muhammad; Wasi; Zainulalimin^{(11)} r. 1752-1753
Arif; Zainulasyiqin^{(12)} r. 1753-1773
Muhammad; Aliuddin I^{(13)} r. 1773-1799 | Muhammad; Muhyiddin; Zainussalihin^{(14)} r. 1799-1801
Muhammad; Ishaq; Zainulmuttaqin^{(15)} r. 1801-1802 | Muhammad; Aliuddin II^{(16)} r. 1803-1808 | Muhammad; Shafiuddin^{(17)} r. 1809-1813
Pangeran; Timur; Soerjaatmadja
Ratu Bagus; Marjono; Soerjaatmadja
Ratu Bagus; Abdulmughni; Soerjaatmadja
Muhammad; Ash-Shafiuddin^{(18)} r. 2016-present
