= Banten–Dutch war (1656–1659) =

17th-century conflict in West Java

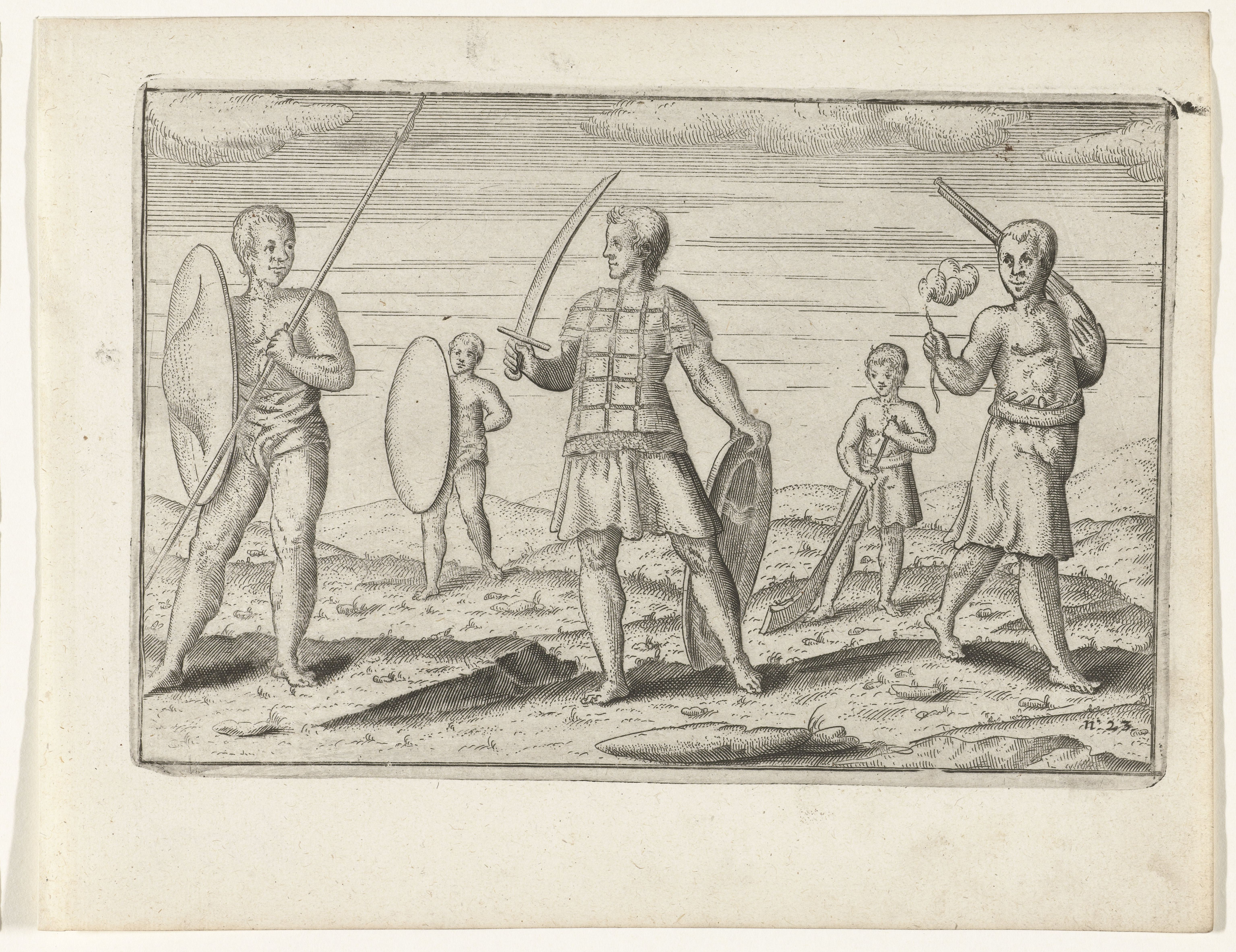
- Depiction of Banten troops, 1646.
Date	1656–1659
Location	Java Sea and Batavia
Result	Bantenese victory
Territorial changes	West Batavia ceded to Banten Sultanate

Belligerents
Banten Sultanate	Dutch East India Company; Batavia

Commanders and leaders
Sultan Abulfath; Aria Wangsakara; Saranurbaya (DOW); Arya Mangunjaya; Prayakarti †	Joan Maetsuycker

Strength
Thousands of troops Hundreds of ships	Unknown, but larger

Casualties and losses
Hundreds of troops were killed and numerous ships sunk	Unknown

The Bantenese–Dutch War of 1656–1659 was a conflict between the Banten Sultanate and the Dutch East India Company (VOC) that took place in West Java from 1656 to 1659. The war began when the Bantenese forces attacked Batavia, the capital city of the Dutch East Indies in present-day Indonesia. The war ended with numerous victories for Banten Sultanate. The Dutch suffered heavy losses, with many of their strategic lodges destroyed and their gold and weapons seized.

== Background ==
The Dutch East India Company (VOC) conquered the Bantenese port city of Jayakarta on 29 May 1619. On the following day, the VOC began rebuilding the city, renamed it "Batavia".

In 1651, Ageng Tirtayasa of Banten was crowned as the Sultan of Banten. He worked to modernize the state and strengthen diplomatic relations with the Danish East Indies and the Cirebon Sultanate. Tirtayasa also started to build irrigation at Pontang to supply his forces in the planned ambush of Dutch shipping.

Sultan Ageng opposed the VOC's goal of ruling the north coast of Java and the planned blockade of Chinese and Persian traders coming to Java which would limit the trade activity of the Banten Sultanate. To prevent the VOC from achieving economic dominance in the region, Sultan Ageng declared war on the Dutch.

=== Action at Angke-Tangerang ===
In 1655, Bantenese forces ambushed VOC shipping that sailed in Angke-Tangerang region. Bantenese forces also infiltrated and attacked the a VOC-owned sugarcane factory. In the aftermath of the attacks, the VOC closed their office and lodges in the area, while the Bantenese prepared their forces to launch further military action upon the VOC.

== War ==
=== Sack on Batavia (1656) ===
In 1656, Bantenese forces launched offensive actions against Batavia. These actions involved arson, looting, and the destruction of numerous VOC-owned sugarcane farms. Bantenese troops also conducted ambushes against VOC troops who were conducting night patrols and killed their commander. Bantenese forces also reportedly murdered Dutch civilians at night. Bantenese forces also seized VOC ships sailing into Batavia from Malacca City. The VOC was concerned by the Bantenese forces after massive damage on Batavia.

=== Battle of Angke ===
To divert the attention of VOC, the troops led by Ngabehi and Prayakarti were tasked with attacking the villages and burning the sugarcanes. Meanwhile, another troop detachment led by Senopati moved towards VOC positions and encircled them with Demang Narapraksa and Demang Wirapraksa, who had silently infiltrated the VOC positions and had slowly started the siege.

The diversionary forces led by Ngabehi and Prayakarti were silently successful in burning and attacking numerous villages and sugarcane fields. The forces led by Senopati moved eastward and slowly encircled the VOC forces, slowing down the movement of VOC forces.

The forces led by Narapaksa and Wirapaksa directly attacked the VOC forces and inflicted heavy losses. Although the Banten forces were successful in their attack, Bantenese commander Prayakarti was killed in the action.

=== Battle of Pontang ===
At Pontang, Prince Bagus led Bantenese naval forces designed to ambush VOC shipping. Bagus concealed his forces among the Dua Islands. When the VOC ships came into the islands, the Bantenese forces launched their attacks and easily defeated the VOC fleets, capturing many of their weapons.

=== Balukbuk incidents ===
The Sarantaka and Sacantaka fleets placed many traps to destroy VOC junks in Balukbuk. When the VOC ships came into Balukbuk, the Banten unexpectedly attacked and boarded the junks. The VOC ships and troops were trapped by this attack. As a result of the engagement, numerous VOC forces were killed in their ships by the Banten forces.

=== Ambush on Tanjung Barangrang ===
Prince Bagus and his forces also launched naval action at Tanjung Barangrang to defeat the VOC junks sailing from Malacca. Prince Bagus and his forces easily defeated the VOC fleets and most of the VOC crews were killed or captured by the Bantenese forces.

=== Ambush on Gosong Busang ===
Kyai Haji Abbas troops conducted naval attacks at Gosong Busang, aiming to defeat the VOC junks. The forces were also able to capture most of their weapons and their flag, as well as treasure and cannons.

=== Battle of Karawang ===
At Karawang, the Bantenese forces led by Rangga Natajiwa and Wirapana successfully defeated the VOC forces. Their forces also overran many of VOC outposts, weakening the VOC control in the area.

=== Ambush on Pelabuhan Ratu ===
At Pelabuhan Ratu, the Bantenese forces under the command of Saranurbaya launched naval actions at Pelabuhan Ratu and successfully defeated the VOC fleet. The naval action adversely affected the economy of the VOC, but Saranurbaya suffered heavy wounds and died five days later.

=== Siege of Surosowan ===
In the Gulf of Banten, off the coast of Surosowan, a flotilla of 11 VOC warships started to besiege the Banten forces from the Lima islands to the Dua islands. In response, strong Bantenese artillery units armed with cannons positioned at Surosowan retaliated against VOC attacks.

Several Bantenese cannons were hitting their targets and causing heavy damage, such as Si Jaka Pekik and Si Muntab. The Si Kalantaka had success in shelling and causing fire on the VOC ships. Many of the VOC ships retreated because of the heavy losses and damage.

=== Battle of Tangerang ===
A day after the naval engagement at Surosowan, the forces led by Arya Mangunjaya marched from Surosowan to Tangerang, along with many wounded soldiers, POW, and many Dutch weapons and cannons which were captured by Banten forces. The battle continued in the following days, many of the troops on both sides were heavily wounded and retreated to their respective bases.

Arya Mangunjaya forces continued the attacks and penetrated the VOC positions into West Batavia. Many of the VOC officials and the military staff of Batavia evacuated from the area because of the attacks. Bantenese forces successfully captured West Batavia.

== Aftermath ==
At the end of war, VOC suffered humiliating and heavy losses. To end the conflict, the VOC decided to offer a peace agreement to Ageng Tirtayasa of Banten, but Sultan Ageng refused to make peace with the VOC. To persuade the Sultans to make peace with the VOC, they called the Sultan of Jambi (an ally of Banten) to help the VOC. Sultan Jambi agreed to the VOC and giving their ambassadors to Banten, and with that, the Sultan Ageng finally agreed to make peace with the VOC and ended the war.

== Citations ==
- Nina, Herlina (2024-03-01). "Konflik Antara Sultan Ageng Tirtayasa Dengan VOC Dam Sultan Haji". Unpad.
- Halwani, Michrob (1989). Catatan Masa Lalu Banten [The Past Of Banten] (in Indonesian). Serang Regency: Indonesian Teachers Association (PGRI).
- Hoessein, Djajadiningrat (1983). Tinjauan kritis tentang Sejarah Banten. Djambatan.
