= Aria Wangsakara =

Seventeenth century Indonesian soldier

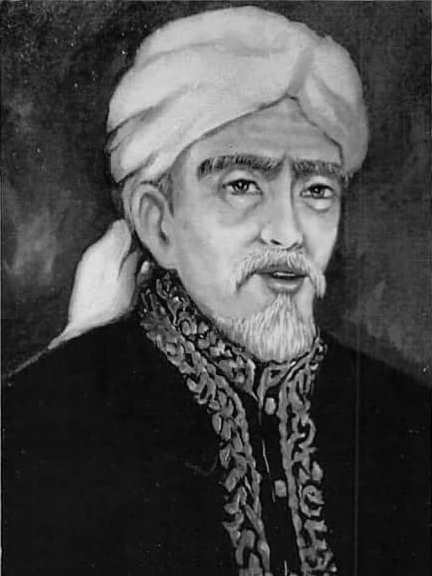
- Artist's conception of Aria Wangsakara
- Born: c. 1615; Sumedang
- Died: c. 1681
- Burial: Pagedangan
- Father: Wiraradja I
- Religion: Islam
- Occupation: Ulema
- Military career
- Conflicts: Battle of Batavia (1654): Banten–Dutch war (1656–1659); Battle of Tangerang; Raid on Indramayu (1678)

Raden Aria Wangsakara (c. 1615 – c. 1681) was a seventeenth century local chief, muslim cleric and patriot originated from Sumedang, who is generally credited as one of the founders of Tangerang, a city in Indonesia which is now within the Jakarta metropolitan area. In November 2021 he was declared as a national hero by president Joko Widodo.

== Biography ==
The exact biography of Aria Wangsakara is difficult in certainty due to contradictory accounts appear in different texts, and lack of concrete evidences. He appears in several traditional texts including the Babad Tangerang and Babad Banten. In those texts he is said to have been born around 1615 in Sumedang, as a son of Wiraraja I, and grandson of King Kusumadinata II (Geusan Ulun) and Queen Harisbaya. He is also a descendant of Syarif Abdulrohman of Cirebon. The traditional narrative mentioned, as the Dutch East India Company influence grew in the region, Aria Wangsakara objected to his family's collaboration with the company and left Sumedang with two relatives in 1632, Aria Santika and Aria Yuda Negara. They went to a region on the banks of the Cisadane River, known today as Tangerang, where he was granted an authorization to protect the region by Sultan Abu al-Mafakhir of Banten. He founded a new settlement there called the Lengkong Sumedang Sultanate on the west bank of Cisadane River with himself became the local chief under the name of Sultan Lengkong. While he ruled there he is said to help the spread of Islam in the surrounding region, by founding a pesantren in the 1640s. In the early 1650s the Dutch East India Company built a fort on the opposite bank of his settlement to establish a presence in the region.

Wangsakara is thought to have died in 1681 and buried in Pagedangan.

== Legacy ==
Due to his status as the legendary founder of Tangerang, a major street in the city is named after him, (Jalan Arya Wangsakara). His tomb (Makan Pahlawan R. Aria Wangsakara), which is also surrounded by the tombs of other clerics from the region, was also turned into an official historical site by the Tangerang Regency and has long been visited regularly by pilgrims. Many residents of Banten also claim descent from him, including a number of Ulama who claim descent from him and his original group of followers. In November 2021, along with Tombolotutu, Aji Muhammad Idris, and Usmar Ismail, he was declared a National Hero of Indonesia by Indonesian president Joko Widodo.
