= Conquest of Sunda Kelapa =

16th-century military battle in Java

- Expansion of Demak sultanate, with a map showing the location and date of the battle
Date	22 June 1527
Location	Jakarta, Java
Result	Demak victory
Territorial changes	Sunda Kelapa became the part of Demak

Belligerents
Demak Sultanate	Sunda Kingdom

Commanders and leaders
Fatahillah	Surawisesa

Strength
1,452 men	Unknown

The conquest of Sunda Kelapa was launched by the Sultanate of Demak against the Sundanese kingdom in the west of Java. The city was successfully conquered and was later renamed Jayakarta (Jakarta).

== Background ==
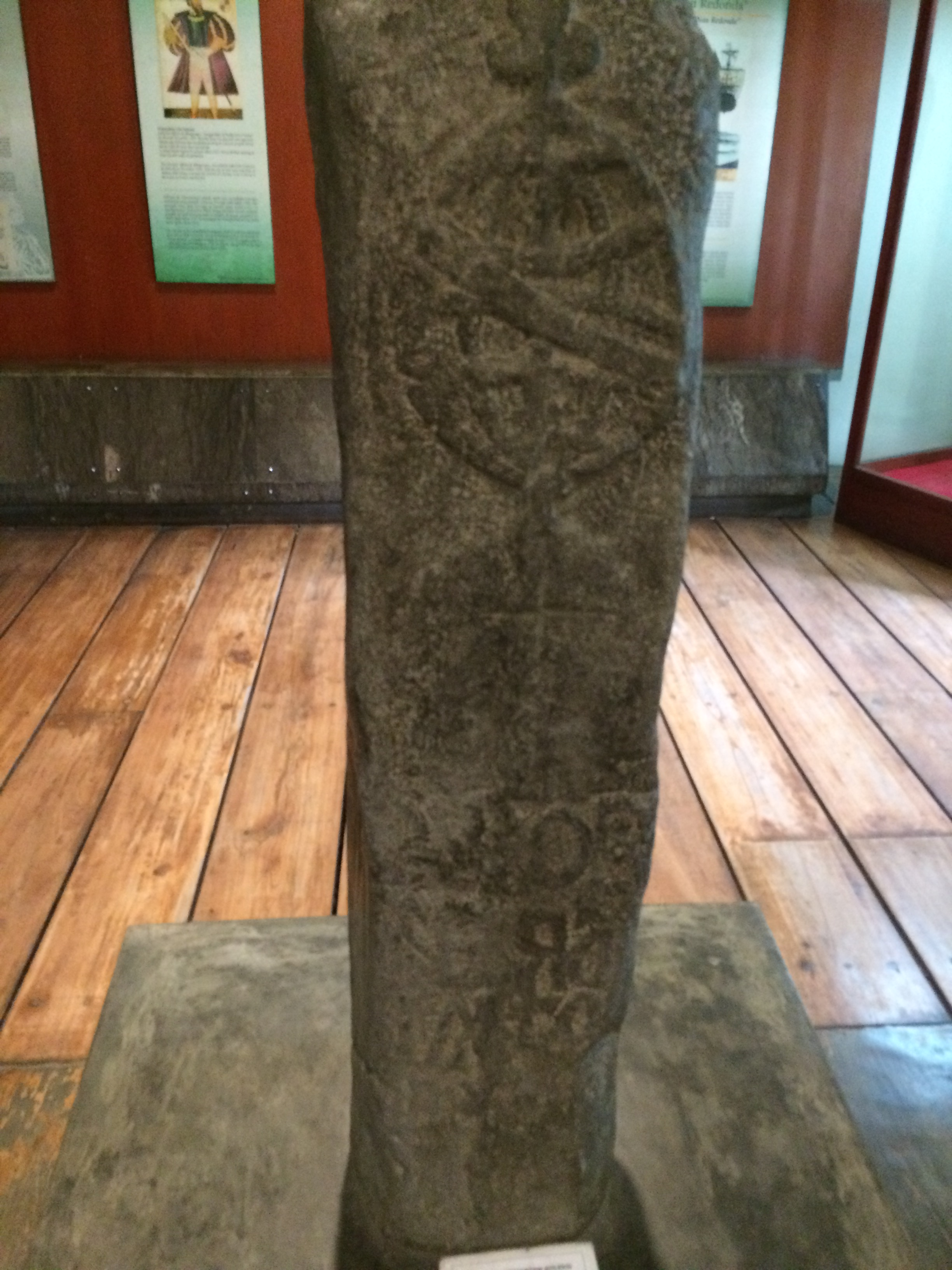
Luso-Sundanese padrão

As more foreign traders began to settle in the ports of the Sunda Kingdom, the control of the kings of these lands began to diminish and was controlled by foreign merchants, fearing that this would lead to carving up their kingdom. However, the Sundanese king, Siliwangi, sent two embassies to Malacca in 1512 and 1521, and a treaty was signed in 1522 between Siliwangi's son, Surawisesa, and the Portuguese captain, Henrique Leme, sent by Jorge de Albuquerque. The treaty was to allow the Portuguese to settle in the kingdom by building a fortress in Jakarta, and the Sundanese would pay a tribute of 1,000 bags of pepper to the Portuguese. However, the Portuguese delayed building the settlement.

In 1478, Cirebon fell completely under the control of locally established foreign Muslim traders with the help and protection of the Demak Sultanate. They assembled troops and rejected the authority of the Sundanese kings. The Demak sultan, Trenggana, was hostile to any Portuguese settlements in Java and decided to prevent them at all costs, so he had his commander, Fatahillah, lead 2,000 men to conquer Banten. The city was easily captured in 1526. Sunda Kelapa was left exposed to Demak troops.

== Conquest ==
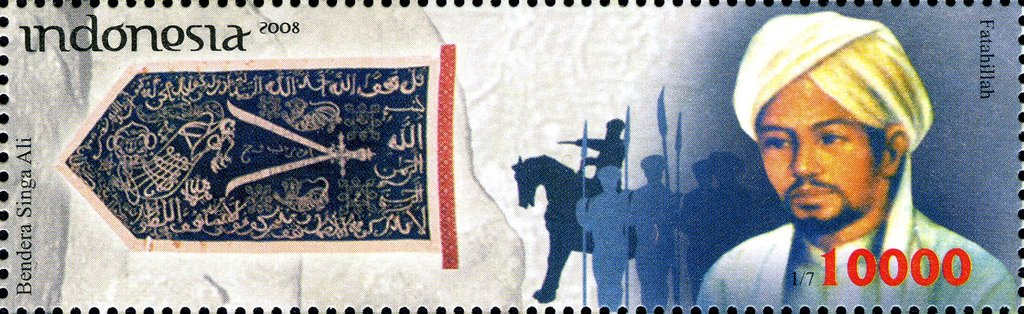
Illustration of Fatahillah in a 2008 Indonesian stamp

In 1527, after consolidating Banten and launching his attack from there, Fatahillah attacked Sunda Kelapa. In this attack, he had 1,452 men added, along with some volunteers from Banten. The Sundanese king stationed most of his forces in his palace, and a small part of them were sent to defend Sunda Kelapa. The Demak fleet and army besieged it from land and water. Fatahillah was able to push back the Sundanese troops, and Sunda Kelapa was conquered on June 22. Fatahillah renamed the city Jakarta.

== Aftermath ==
Following his victory, Trenggana named Fatahilla the viceroy of the Sultan at Banten. The situation between Banten and Sunda remained quiet for some time. Later, one of the nobles in Pakuan Pajajaran opened one of the gates for Banten troops at night, and the city was captured. Surawiesa escaped to the southern mountains, leaving his kingdom for Fatahillah.

Later, on 29 July 1527, the Portuguese sent an expedition of 300 men and five or six ships led by Francisco de Sa and Duarte Coelho to build a fort in Sunda. However, the fleet was hit by a storm that separated them, and Coelho arrived with his three ships at Sunda. One of the ships ran ashore, and its entire crew was attacked and killed, 30 of them once they landed. Coelho awaited the arrival of Francisco's troops. They held a meeting and decided that they weren't strong enough to attack, so they sailed back to Malacca, destroying the Sundanese king's hopes.

The Portuguese decided to put their treaty on hold and five years later, after the fall of Sunda Kelapa, were openly trading with rulers of Banten.

== Legacy ==
In 1956, Soediro set Demak's conquest of Sunda Kelapa date as Jakarta's birthday. Since then, Jakarta has annually celebrated 22nd June as its anniversary.

== See also ==
- Acehnese–Portuguese conflicts
- Malay-Portuguese conflicts
