= Banten Girang =

Coordinates: 6.131°S 106.158°E

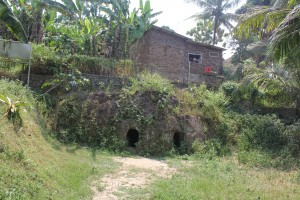
Carved cave in Banten Girang site

Banten Girang is an ancient settlement in Sempu village, Serang, Banten, located about 10 km south of the port of Banten along the Cibanten River. It dates back to the Sunda Kingdom era (932–1030 CE) and translated as "Banten-up-the-river," referring to its inland location. The archaeological site includes tombs, a punden berundak (stepped pyramid), and man-made cave niches carved into stone cliffs. A research done by the French archaeologist Claude Guillot's from 1988 to 1992 suggests Banten Girang was a settlement that thrived between the 10th and 14th centuries. It later became the precursor to the Banten Sultanate, which emerged in the 16th century as a major coastal trade hub, particularly for the regional pepper trade.

== History ==
The vicinity of Banten Girang has been inhabited since at least the 10th century, if not earlier. Evidence of early Hindu influence in the region is found in several 10th-century statues housed in the National Museum of Indonesia in Jakarta. These statues, known as the "Caringin statues," were originally used as garden decorations by a Dutch assistant resident in Caringin, a village near the Sunda Strait. Reports indicate that the statues were discovered in the Cipanas area, near the crater of Mount Pulosari, located east of Caringin and southwest of Banten Girang.

The collection includes a pedestal and five statues depicting Hindu deities—Shiva Mahadeva, Durga, Agastya, Ganesha, and Brahma. Their artistic style closely resembles that of Central Javanese Hindu sculptures from the early 10th century, linking them to the religious and artistic traditions of the Medang Mataram kingdom in Central Java. This connection suggests that Mount Pulosari, in proximity to Banten Girang, served as an important religious center for the Sundanese kingdom.

A Chinese historical source, Chu-fan-chi, written around the year 1200 by Chou Ju-kua, identifies Sriwijaya and Java (Kediri) as the two most powerful and prosperous kingdoms in the Indonesian archipelago at the time. According to this account, Sriwijaya maintained control over Sumatra, the Malay Peninsula, and the port of Sin-t'o (Sunda) in western Java during the early 13th century. The port of Sunda is described as a flourishing trade hub, renowned for its high-quality black pepper. The local population primarily engaged in agriculture, and their houses were built on wooden stilts or known as rumah panggung. However, the region was troubled by frequent robberies and theft. Although Chou Ju-kua does not specify which Sunda port he refers to, but since it was situated near the Sunda Strait, scholars suggest that it likely corresponds to the port of Banten rather than Kalapa in modern-day Jakarta.

In the early 16th century, Prabu Pucuk Umun ruled over Banten, with Banten Girang serving as its capital. At the time, Hinduism was the dominant religion, and Mount Pulosari was home to around 800 priests. The region’s main trading hub was Banten Ilir, also known as Banten Lama.

According to Sejarah Banten, when Sunan Gunungjati and his son, Hasanuddin, arrived in Banten Girang, they visited Mount Pulosari, which was considered the kingdom’s spiritual center. There, Gunungjati converted the local population to Islam and took control of the kingdom through military conquest. In 1526, Demak’s forces, led by Gunungjati with the support of Hasanuddin and Ki Jongjo, captured the ports of Banten and the settlement of Banten Girang. With the approval of the Sultan of Demak, Gunungjati then assumed rule over Banten.

The late 16th-century manuscript Carita Parahyangan refers to Banten Girang as Wahanten Girang. According to the text, Wahanten Girang fell to Arya Bubrah, a figure believed to be Fatahillah Khan, a military commander serving Demak-Cirebon. Fatahillah is also known for his conquest of Sunda Kalapa, further expanding Demak’s influence in the region.

Gunungjati did not establish a brand-new kingdom but instead took over the rule of the existing Banten Girang polity. Following the passing of the Sundanese ruler, known in Portuguese records as King Samiam (Sanghyang), Hasanuddin rose to power. This moment marked the beginning of the Islamic Kingdom of Banten. Seeking a more strategic location, Hasanuddin relocated the capital from Banten Girang to the port city of Banten, a few kilometers downstream. Despite this shift, Banten Girang remained in use as a retreat or royal resting palace for Banten’s rulers until the late 17th century.
