= Abu al-Mafakhir of Banten =

Sultan of Banten Sultanate (died 1651)

Sultan Abu Al-Mafakhir Mahmud Abdulkadir
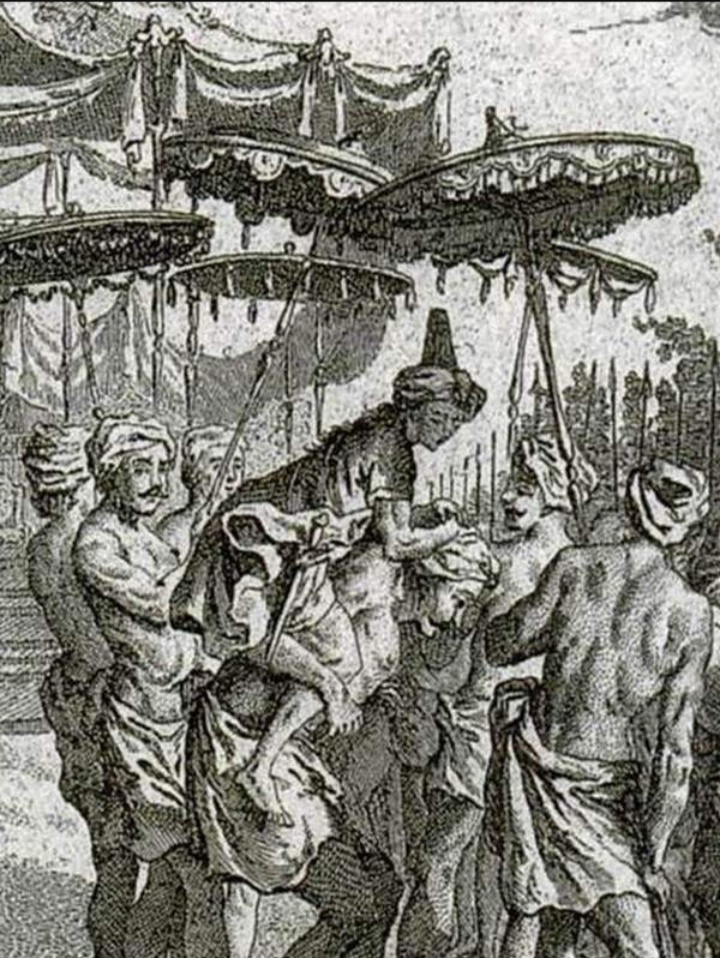
- The circumcision ceremony of Abu al-Mafakhir Mahmud Abdulkadir in 1605 according to 18th century French graphic works

4th Sultan of Banten
- In office 1624–1651
- Preceded by: Maulana Muhammad
- Succeeded by: Abu Al-Ma'ali Ahmad

Personal life
- Born: Januari 1596 Banten Sultanate
- Died: 10 March 1651 Banten Sultanate
- Resting place: Pemakaman Kenari Banten, Kasemen
- Children: Abu al-Ma'ali Ahmad
- Parents: Maulana Muhammad (father); Nyimas Ratu Ayu Wanagiri (mother)
- Dynasty: Hasan al-Bantani
- Known for: Sultan of Banten

Religious life
- Religion: Islam
- Denomination: Sunni

Muslim leader
- Predecessor: Maulana Hasanuddin
- Successor: Sultan Ageng Tirtayasa
- Dynasty: Hasan al-Bantani

Sultan Abu al-Mafakhir Mahmud Abdulkadir or better known as Pangeran Ratu (died 1651) was the ruler of Banten in Northwest Java, Indonesia, and was the first ruler anywhere on the island of Java to take the title of sultan, which he took in 1638, under the Arabic name Abu al-Mafakhir Mahmud Abdulkadir. This set a precedent for Sultan Agung of Mataram soon afterwards to take the title himself.

Pangeran Ratu reigned during a prosperous trading time, from which his empire gained considerable wealth; however it was also a period of increasing European influence in Western Java. In 1603, the first permanent trading post of the Dutch East India Company (VOC) was established in Banten, and in 1602 the English were also given a trading post there. Jayakarta (modern Jakarta) was then a vassal of Banten, which both the English and Dutch sought for its natural harbor. Bantenese forces held the territory from both, until the VOC under Jan Pieterszoon Coen burned down the town and drove the Bantenese out, and renamed it Batavia.

From 1633 to 1639, another war was fought with the Dutch, which ended with a vague ceasefire commitment. A treaty in 1645 clarified the situation, which held until the reign of Pangeran Ratu's successor, Ageng.

== Notes ==
Preceded by Maulana Muhammad	Sultan of Banten; 1596–1651	Succeeded by Ageng
