= Ageng Tirtayasa of Banten =

Sultan of Banten Sultanate

Sultan Ageng Tirtayasa
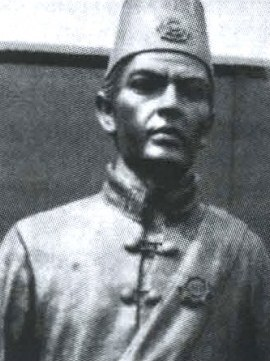

6th Sultan of Banten
- Reign: 1651–1683
- Predecessor: Abu al-Ma'ali Ahmad of Banten
- Successor: Haji of Banten
- Born: 1631; Banten Sultanate
- Died: 1692 (aged 60–61); Batavia
- Burial: Old Banten, Serang
- Issue: Haji of Banten
- House: Azmatkhan
- Father: Abu al-Ma'ali Ahmad of Banten
- Religion: Sunni Islam

Tirtayasa (1631–1692), regnal name Sultan Ageng Tirtayasa and also known as Abulfatah Agung (Abu al-Fath Abdulfattah), was the sixth sultan of Banten (on Java in present-day Indonesia) and reigned from 1651 to 1683, a period often characterized by commercial expansion and diplomatic engagement across Asia.

== Reign ==
Ageng developed a substantial fleet modeled in part on European designs and maintained long-distance trade routes within the Indonesian archipelago and beyond. With the assistance or presence of English, Danish, and Chinese intermediaries, Bantenese shipping traded with Persia, India, Ayutthaya (Siam), Vietnam, China, the Philippines and Japan. In 1661, Banten extended authority to Landak in western Borneo; Landak became a dependency after Banten's intervention in regional conflicts. During the 1670s, Banten leveraged turmoil in the Mataram court to assert predominance over Cirebon, reshaping power on Java's north coast. Banten also engaged the Spanish in Manila to obtain silver and invested in irrigation and canals supporting coconut palm and sugar cultivation around Tirtayasa.

=== Conflict with the Dutch ===
Ageng opposed the Dutch East India Company (VOC) and clashed with its headquarters at Batavia, about 75 km to the east. After the breakdown of earlier agreements, hostilities in 1656–1659 included a VOC blockade of Banten and Bantenese raids against Batavian interests, ending in a negotiated settlement. Court politics later polarized between Ageng and his son and co-sovereign Haji of Banten (Abu Nasr), who favored accommodation with the VOC.

=== Internal conflict ===
Anticipating a coup, Ageng withdrew from the capital before 1671. He supported Trunajaya's revolt against Amangkurat II of Mataram and used the ensuing instability to gain control in Cirebon and the Priangan highlands, effectively surrounding Batavia with Bantenese positions.

=== Defeat ===
Open war with the VOC began in 1680. In May of that year Haji confined Ageng in a palace coup. After fluctuating fortunes, Ageng’s faction was routed when VOC forces intervened for Haji; Ageng surrendered in March 1683. He was detained in Banten, then transferred to Batavia, where he died in 1692.

== Letters to Danish–Norwegian kings ==
To expand trade, Ageng corresponded with Frederick III of Denmark–Norway and Christian V of Denmark–Norway. A letter of 7 January 1675 to Frederick III—also signed by Banten's shahbandar—requested cannon and powder and noted that 176 bahara of pepper had been stored for lack of space on the Danish ship Færö. Another letter, dated 15 February 1675 to Christian V, referred again to the 176 bahara deposited with Duke Angabèhi Cakradana of Bantam.

== Notes ==
Preceded by Ratu	Sultan of Banten; 1651–1683	Succeeded by Abu Nasr Abdul Kahhar (Haji)
