= Maulana Hasanuddin =

Sultan of Banten Sultanate

- First ruler of Banten Sultanate
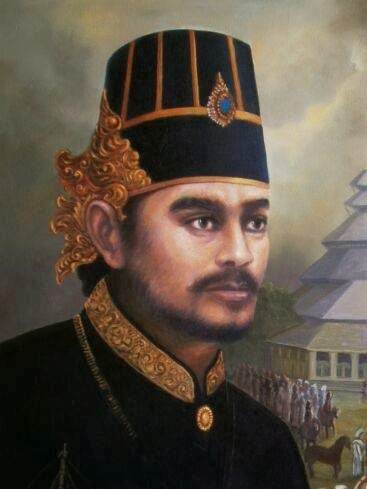

Sultan of Banten
- Reign: 1552–1570
- Predecessor: Sunan Gunungjati (sultan of Cirebon)
- Successor: Maulana Yusuf
- Born: Pangeran Sabakingking; 1478
- Died: 1570 (aged 91–92); Banten Sultanate
- Burial: Great Mosque of Banten, Old Banten, Serang
- Issue: Maulana Yusuf of Banten; Pangeran Sunyararas
- House: Azmatkhan
- Father: Sunan Gunungjati
- Mother: Nyai Ratu Kawunganten
- Religion: Sunni Islam

Maulana Hasanuddin (also spelled Hasanuddin) was the first Sultan of Banten, ruling from c. 1552 to 1570. Hasanuddin was a Azmatkhani Sayyid, the son of Sunan Gunungjati and Nyai Ratu Kawunganten.

He extended the domains of Banten to the pepper-producing region of Lampung, in South Sumatra. This area, which already had long-standing ties with West Java, facilitated Banten's rise to prominence as a pepper port.

== Notes ==
Preceded by -	Sultan of Banten ca. 1552–1570	Succeeded by Maulana Yusuf of Banten
