= Abu an-Nasr of Banten =

Sultan of Banten Sultanate

Abu Nasr Abdul Kahhar (also known as Sultan Haji or Haji of Banten) was the seventh Sultan of Banten from 1682 to 1687, who was largely responsible for subjugating Banten to the Dutch East India Company (VOC). He had considerable political power as a crown prince, and from the 1650s the court was divided into factions in support of his father Ageng and him. The VOC even called them the "old Sultan" and "young Sultan," respectively. Haji's faction was in favor of a stronger relationship with the VOC in nearby Batavia, while Ageng was a firm opponent of such a relationship.

Haji's faction gained the upper hand in May 1680, just as Ageng had Batavia surrounded and was declaring war on the Dutch. His father had a decade earlier withdrawn to a residence outside Banten proper, but Haji led a coup and confined Ageng to his residence outside the city. His position was weak, however, because he lacked the support of the Muslim elite, who remained loyal to his father, and who resented his overtures to the Dutch. He turned to the VOC for help, but they were unwilling to help unless he agreed to certain conditions: that escaping slaves and deserters be returned to Batavia even if they converted to Islam, that "pirates" be punished and the VOC compensated for their attacks, that Cirebon (on the opposite side of Batavia from Banten) be yielded, that there be no more interference in the relations of Batavia and the Mataram Sultanate, and that other Europeans be excluded trade with Banten. This constituted nearly all independent foreign policy of the sultanate, and the trade restriction would undermine the basis of their prosperity, but as Haji's position in Banten grew desperate, he accepted the agreement in 1682.

By the time a VOC force led by François Tack and Isaac de Saint-Martin came to help, Haji was besieged in his palace by his father's supporters. The VOC then recognized him as sultan, and drove Ageng from his residence into the countryside, where he surrendered in 1683. Batavia then gained control of Cirebon and the Priangan highlands, which had been taken by Ageng in 1677 when they were lost by Mataram.

Preceded by Ageng	Sultan of Banten; 1682-1687	Succeeded by Abdul Fadhl
