= Maulana Yusuf =

Sultan of Banten Sultanate

Maulana Yusuf (also spelled Molana Yusup) was the second sultan of Banten, and reigned from c. 1570 to 1580.

About 1579, he conquered Pajajaran, which was the last significant Hindu-Buddhist kingdom on Java. With this conquest, the Sundanese elite are said to have embraced Islam.

== Notes ==
Preceded by Hasanudin	Sultan of Banten c. 1570–1580	Succeeded by Maulana Muhammad
