= Banten Sultanate =

Kingdom based on the island of Java (1527–1813)

Banten Sultanate ᮊᮞᮥᮜ᮪ᮒᮔᮔ᮪ ᮘᮔ᮪ᮒᮨᮔ᮪ كسلطانن بنتن Kasultanan Banten
- 1526–1813
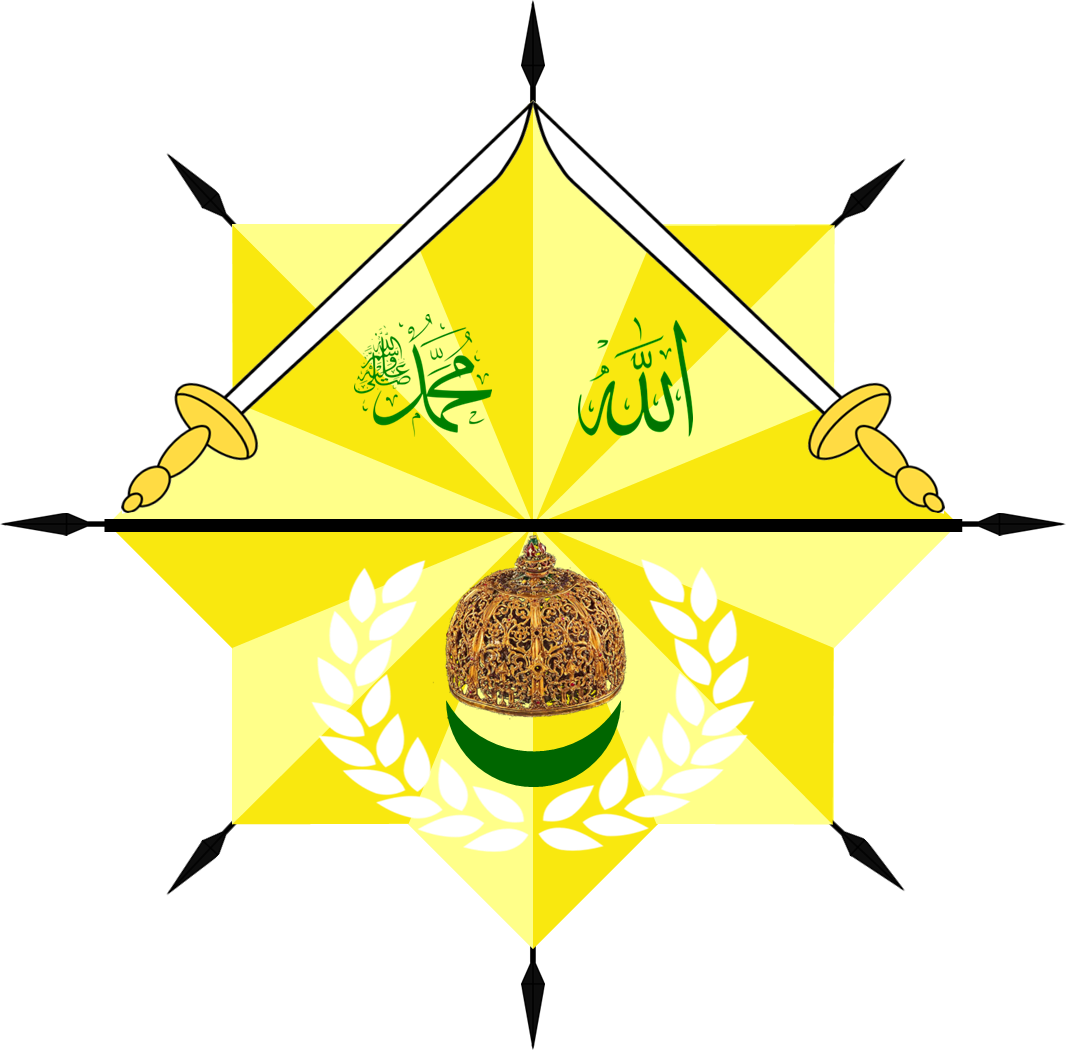
- Flag Coat of arms

- Rough extent of the Sultanate of Banten at the death of Sultan Maulana Hasanuddin in 1570, controlling both sides of the Sunda Strait
- Status: De jure province of Cirebon Sultanate (1526–1552); Client state of the Demak Sultanate (1527–1546); Independent state (1552–1683); Client state of the Dutch Empire (1683–1813)
- Capital: Old Banten
- Common languages: Bantenese (predominantly); Malay (trade and diplomatic); Sundanese; Cirebonese; Lampung
- Religion: Islam
- Government: Sultanate
- Sultan
  - 1552–1570: Sultan Maulana Hasanuddin
  - 1651–1683: Sultan Ageng Tirtayasa
  - 1809–1813: Sultan Maulana Muhammad Shafiuddin
  - 2016–now (Note: pretender): Sultan Syarif Muhammad ash-Shafiuddin
- History
  - Syarif Hidayatullah conquered Banten: 1526
  - Conquest of the Sunda Kingdom: 1527
  - Independence from Cirebon Sultanate: 1552
  - Fall of Jayakarta: 1619
  - Client state of VOC: 1683
  - Annexed by the French Empire: 1808
  - Annexed by the Dutch East Indies: 1813

Population
  - 1696 est.: 191,000
Preceded by
Sunda Kingdom
Cirebon Sultanate
Demak Sultanate
Succeeded by
Bantam Residency
Bantam Presidency
Batavia
- Today part of: Indonesia

The Banten Sultanate (Sundanese: ᮊᮞᮥᮜ᮪ᮒᮔᮔ᮪ ᮘᮔ᮪ᮒᮨᮔ᮪, كسلطانن بنتن, Kasultanan Banten) was a Bantenese Islamic trading kingdom founded in the 16th century and centred in Banten, a port city on the northwest coast of Java; the contemporary English name of both was Bantam. It is said to have been founded by Sunan Gunungjati, who had previously founded Cirebon.

Once a great trading centre in Southeast Asia, especially of pepper, the kingdom reached its apogee from the late 16th to the mid-17th centuries. By the late 17th century, it was overshadowed by Batavia and was finally annexed to the Dutch East Indies in 1813.

Its core territory now forms the Indonesian province of Banten. Today, in Old Banten, the Great Mosque of Banten is an important destination for tourists and for pilgrims from across Indonesia and from overseas.

== Formation ==
Prior to 1526, a settlement called Banten was situated about ten kilometres inland from the coast on the Cibanten River, in what is today a suburb of Serang town. It was known as Banten Girang, meaning "Upper Banten" owing to its location. This town previously was a native Hindu Sundanese principality that was held under the Kingdom of Sunda.

A grandson of the King of Sunda, Sri Baduga Maharaja (also known as Prabu Siliwangi) was an ulama named Sunan Gunungjati (Sharif Hidayatullah). He was part of the educated class of Muslim legal scholars who was educated in the Middle East. In the early 16th century, Gunungjati arrived in the town of Banten Girang with the intention of spreading Islam in the then Hindu-dominated area. Gunungjati eventually became the tumenggong of the Sultanate of Cirebon in 1479, succeeding his uncle and father-in-law Prince Cakrabuana who had also founded Cirebon town in 1445. In 1482 Gunungjati sent a letter to his grandfather, proclaiming independence of Cirebon from Sunda. According to the Suma Oriental, written in 1512–1515 by Tomé Pires, a Portuguese explorer, it was reported that the port of Banten still belonged to the Hindu Kingdom of Sunda, while Cirebon had been established as an Islamic state.

"First the king of Çumda (Sunda) with his great city of Dayo, the town and lands and port of Bantam (Banten), the port of Pomdam (Pontang), the port of Cheguide (Cigede), the port of Tamgaram (Tangerang), the port of Calapa (Kelapa), and the port of Chemano (Chi Manuk or Cimanuk), this is Sunda, because the river of Chi Manuk is the limit of both kingdoms. Now comes Java and we must speak of the kings within the hinterland. The land of Cheroboam (Cirebon), the land of Japura, the land of Locarj (Losari), the land of Tateguall (Tegal), the land of Camaram (Semarang), the land of Demaa (Demak)."

— Suma Oriental.

Although at first well received by the Sunda authorities, once news of the Portuguese-Sunda alliance in 1522 became known, Gunungjati asked the Demak Sultanate to send troops to Banten, starting the Demak-Sundanese war. It was likely that his son Hasanudin commanded this military operation in 1527, just as the Portuguese fleet was arriving of the coast at Sunda Kelapa to capture these towns. Subsequently, the Portuguese fleet that intended to establish a coastal fortress was defeated by the combined Cirebon and Demak forces.

Gunungjati and his son settled in Banten Girang, and took control of both the port of Banten and Kelapa, while Surawisesa, the king of Sunda at that time was powerless to prevent this takeover and signed a peace treaty with Demak and Cirebon in 1531. Gunungjati crowned Hasanudin as the temenggong of Banten with authority bestowed by the Sultan of Demak Trenggana who, in turn, offered Hasanudin his sister's hand in marriage. This resulted in the establishment of a new dynasty and a new kingdom. Old Banten (currently part of Serang town) was the capital of this kingdom, and was held as a province under the Sultanate of Cirebon.

== Growth ==
=== Initial expansion of Hasanuddin ===
Sultan Hasanuddin planned on reviving the fortunes of the ancient kingdom of Sunda — the rice and spice trade, especially pepper. One of his earliest decisions was to travel to southern Sumatra (today Lampung province), which had traditionally belonged to the kingdom of Sunda, and from which the bulk of the pepper sold in the Sundanese region came. He was keen to assure himself of the loyalty of these agriculturally wealthy areas as soon as possible and to guarantee supplies of pepper for his ports, since it was on this spice that all international trade was based and, hence, in which the wealth of his kingdom lay.

Having established control over the ports and the pepper trade, Hasanuddin decided to build a new capital, to symbolise the new era which was beginning. On the advice of his father, Sunan Gunungjati, he chose to construct it on the coast at the mouth of the Cibanten River. A settlement had already existed at this place as evidenced by its harbour activities, however the settlement's seat of political power was in Banten Girang. The royal city was founded on the delta, formed by the two arms of the river. Two main streets running north–south and east–west divided the city into quarters. The royal palace was surrounded by residences of the principal minister of state, and was built on the south side of the royal square while the great mosque on the west side. Foreigners, for the most part merchants, had to live outside the royal city, that is on either side of the delta. The international trade was accommodated in the larger western harbour where Pecinan (Chinatown), European trading post and the foreigner quarters were located, while the eastern port accommodated domestic trade with smaller vessels, and where the retail market was also located. A ship-wright to repair ships was located on the eastern side of the city. Hasanuddin tried to invade multiple times during the reign of Ratu Dewata, however his efforts failed due to the strong defense employed by the Sundanese army.

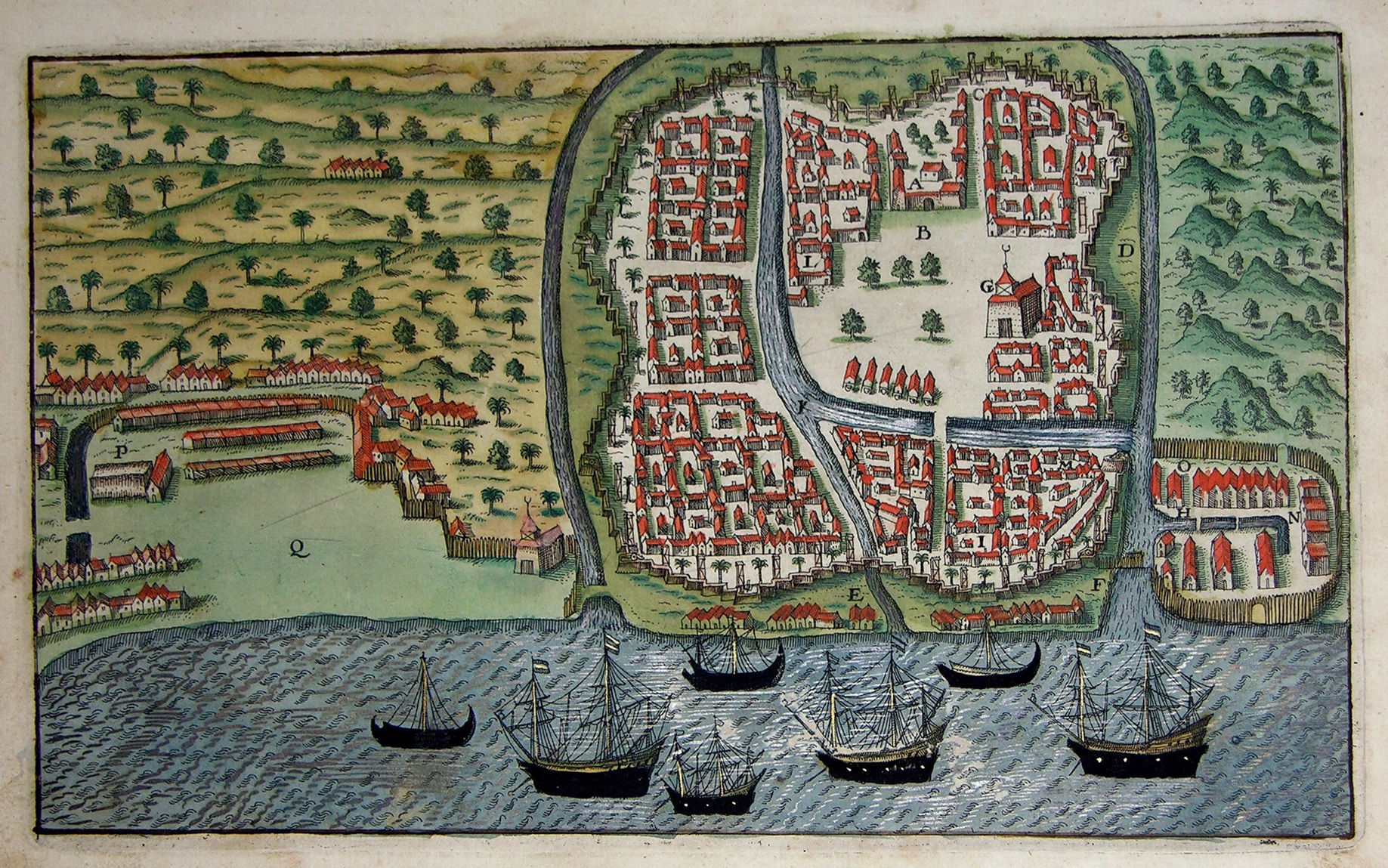
The city of Bantam, 1599

After 20 years the new dynasty was so firmly established that Hasanuddin had no hesitation in leaving the kingdom in 1546 to take part in a military expedition against Pasuruan in eastern Java, at the request of Sultan Trenggana, the third sultan of Demak. At that time, Banten was still under the suzerainty of Demak, and thus were obliged to fulfill the duty as a vassal state to participate in Demak's endeavour. During this venture, the Demak Sultan lost his life, and it is likely that Hasanuddin took advantage of his suzerain's death and the troubles which ensued to free his kingdom from any further obligations to this royal house.

From the 1550s onwards the kingdom enjoyed a period of great prosperity. Trade saw a significant growth due to the flourishing trade with Portuguese Malacca, a former enemy that despite their political rivalry, saw Portuguese fleets trading in Banten for pepper. According to tradition, the development of this kingdom was managed by Hasanuddin's son, Maulana Yusuf, who had become co-sovereign with his father, following a custom long practised in the archipelago.

Rapid economic development led to an increase of the urban population. Major agricultural developments to ensure food production was launched, by constructing irrigation canals, dams and the expansion of ricefields. The royal city itself had undertaken a major project; 1.80 metres thick brick ramparts were built encircling the entire city which spanned 8 kilometres. Maulana Yusuf also led the construction of the Great Mosque of Banten, perhaps built upon an older and simpler structure.

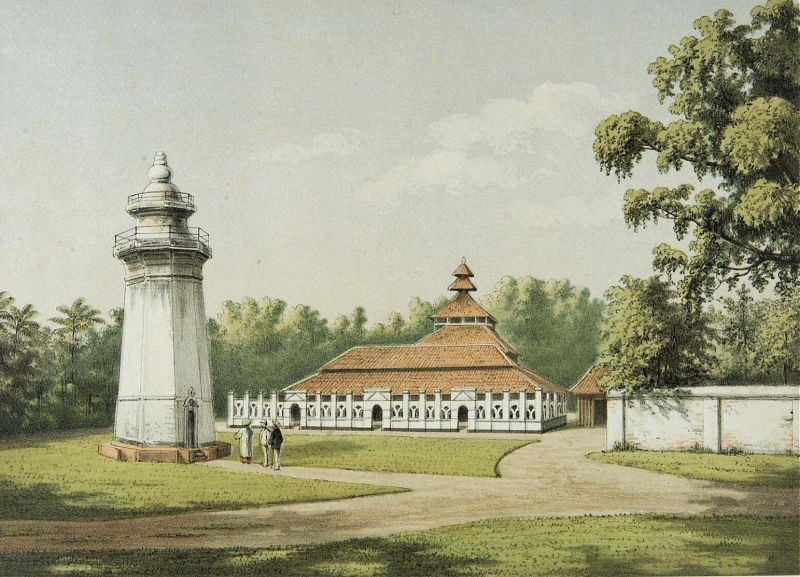
Colonial era sketch of Grand Mosque of Banten

Also during this period, Hasanuddin decided to launch the final blow to what remained of the Kingdom of Sunda. Maulana Yusuf led the attack on Dayeuh Pakuan, its capital city located in modern Bogor. After losing its most important port Sunda Kelapa, the kingdom, already deprived of its trading revenues, was of symbolic importance only. Nilakendra, the Sundanese ruler at that time, decided to move the center of government to Pulasari (present-day Pandeglang Regency). The already-weakened kingdom put up little resistance and henceforth Banten ruled over the territory of the former Kingdom of Sunda west of the Citarum River. Geusan Ulun, the ruler of Sumedang Larang, refused to acknowledge Banten's authority over the former territory of Sunda and proclaimed his kingdom as the successor of Sunda. Sumedang Larang would later become part of the Mataram Sultanate.

The sacred stone (watu gigilang) that was serving as the sovereign's throne of the Sunda Kingdom was taken away and placed at the street intersection in the royal square of Banten, thus marking the end of the Sundanese dynasty. Henceforth, this stone was to serve as the Banten sovereign's throne.

When Hasanuddin died in 1570, the royal kingdom of Banten comprised all of Sunda, except for Cirebon and Sumedang Larang, and all of southern Sumatra, as far as Tulangbawang (modern-day Lampung) and Bengkulu. Trade was expanding to become one of the largest in Southeast Asia.

=== Maulana Yusuf and a crisis of succession ===
After the death of Hasanuddin in 1570 at 70 years old, Maulana Yusuf ascended the throne when he was about 40. He was already an experienced ruler as co-sovereign with his late father. During Yusuf's reign, his younger brother Pangeran Japara returned from Jepara in Central Java. The name of this prince describes that he had spent his life in Jepara, the late king Hasanuddin had entrusted his younger son under the care of Queen Kalinyamat of Jepara.

Yusuf chose his young son Prince Muhammad as heir. However, not long after, Yusuf fell ill and died in 1580. The chosen successor, Prince Muhammad was only a child of 9 years old at that time and was not come of age. Thus, this provoked the first crisis of succession, as his uncle — Pangeran Japara, was eager to replace his late brother as the new king of Banten.

This created two factions in Banten's court; one led by the Prime Minister of the late Yusuf that supported Pangeran Japara, while the other faction was led by the qadi of Banten, an important religious figure and the head of the regency council that insisted on the protection of the inheritance and rights of the child prince Muhammad. The tension increased and almost broke into a war of succession, yet being undone in the last minute due to the reversal of the Prime Minister who withdrew his support for Pangeran Japara.

Claude Guillot, a historian on Banten, argues that in the Banten court there was two competing factions; the liberals represented by Ponggawa civil servants and merchants, and the elitist Nayaka and Santana nobilities who favoured strong government control. The rise of the child prince as the successor was a victory for the liberals which saw more years of economic liberty without too much interference from the royal household.

=== Muhammad and the Palembang campaign ===
Prince Muhammad ascended to the throne in 1580 when he was 9 years of age. During the reign of the young king, Banten continued to flourish as merchants enjoyed relative freedom in trade. Pepper remained Banten's top export commodity. However, the wealth was generated by large numbers of merchants from the ports of the Indian Ocean and the South China Sea that was flocking to Banten. The influx of traders filled the tax income of Banten's treasury.

Feeling confident of the wealth and the power of his kingdom, the youthful 25 year-old King Muhammad in 1596 launched a military campaign against the principality of Palembang — both by naval fleet and by land army marching through Southern Sumatra. At that time, Palembang was still a Hindu-Buddhist polity, a remnant of Majapahit overseas vassal, which was regarded by Muslim Banten as a pagan state. Inspired by his illustrious grandfather Hasanuddin and his valiant father Maulana Yusuf, that conquered the pagan kingdom of Sunda, Muhammad was eager to find fame of his own by expanding his realm. By 1596 the siege of Palembang was set in place, and when victory seemed within his grasp, a sudden tragedy happened as a cannonball struck and killed the king on his ship when he was sailing on the Musi River by the city. With the sudden death of the young monarch, Banten's expansionist policy was shattered, as the troops retreated and sailed home.

=== Western contacts and crisis ===
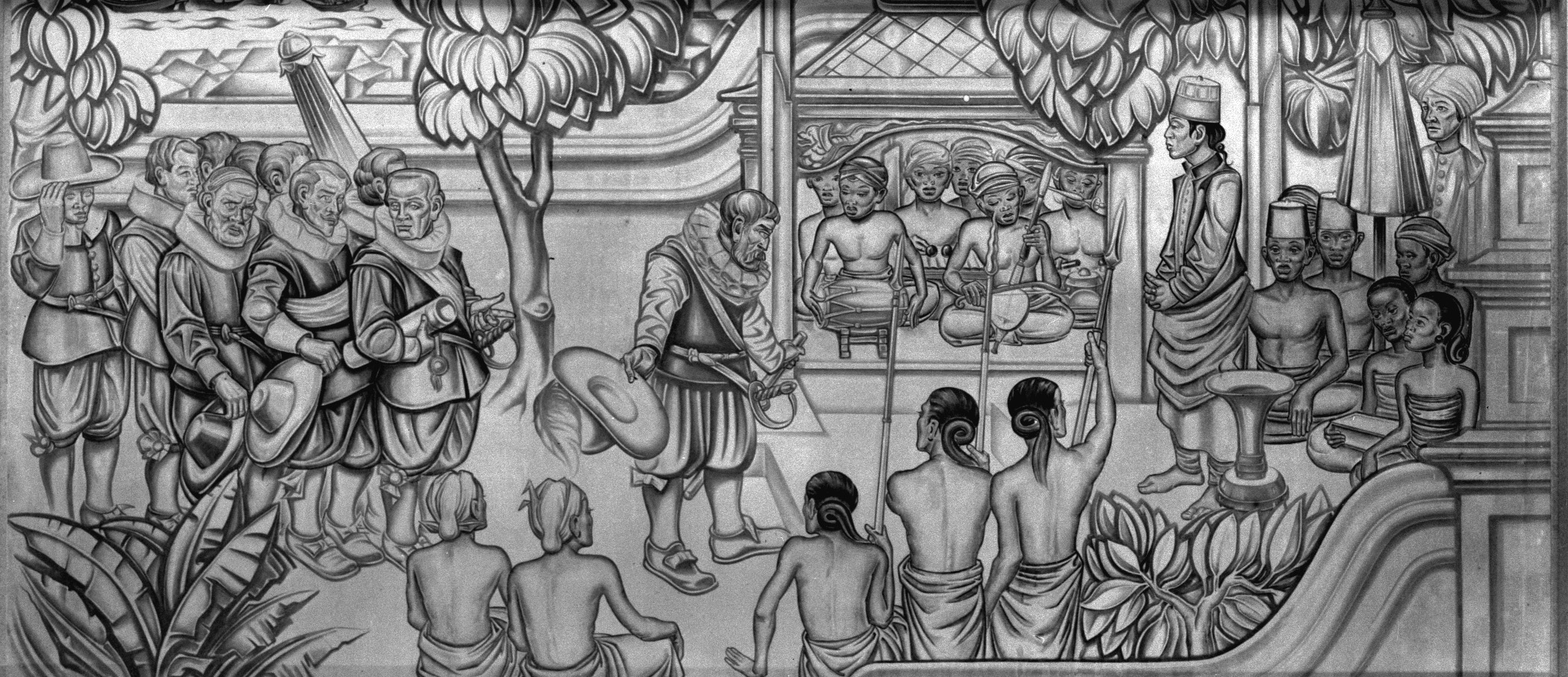
The reception of Cornelis de Houtman in Java in 1596 by Paulides.

The successor, the infant and future Sultan Abulmafakhir was still a few months old, when a few months after the king's death, a new faction of European merchant fleets arrived in Banten. On 27 June 1596 Dutch trade ships led by Cornelis de Houtman, the first Dutch fleet to arrive in East Indies, landed in Banten. On its return to the Netherlands, the voyage (1595–97) generated a modest profit.

In 1600 the Dutch set up the Dutch East Indies Company (Dutch: Vereenigde Oostindische Compagnie or VOC) with the aim to bypass the spice trade. Unlike the Portuguese in Malacca which at that time quite harmoniously integrated into the Asian trade system involving various states in the region including Banten; the Dutch as a newcomer had a different approach, they planned on seizing control of the spice trade from the Far East up to Europe. The Portuguese and the Dutch fought fiercely for influence in Banten in the early 17th century, which erupted into a full-scale naval battle on Bay of Banten in 1601, in which the Portuguese fleet was crushed.

Other Europeans were soon to follow. The English, who started to sail to the East Indies from around 1600, established a permanent trading post in Banten in 1602 under James Lancaster. In 1603, the first permanent Dutch trading post in Indonesia was established in Banten.

With the infant king and the absence of a decisive central figure, the government was taken over by the regency council. The expulsion of the Portuguese had led to both Dutch and English vying for control of the city. The court itself was divided into two competing factions, and civil war erupted in 1602. Peace was not restored until 1609 when one of the nayaka nobles, Prince Ranamanggala ascended to power as a new regent.

Ranamanggala restored the state's authority on commercial affairs; levying taxes, imposing prices and the volume of trade. He also exiled the ponggawa elites to the port of Jayakarta in the east, stripping the merchants' power altogether. This strong new policy showed disregard for the principles of free trade did not sit well with the Dutch and the English. A few years later the Dutch and English followed suit, they went to Jayakarta to establish a new trade post.

== Later period ==
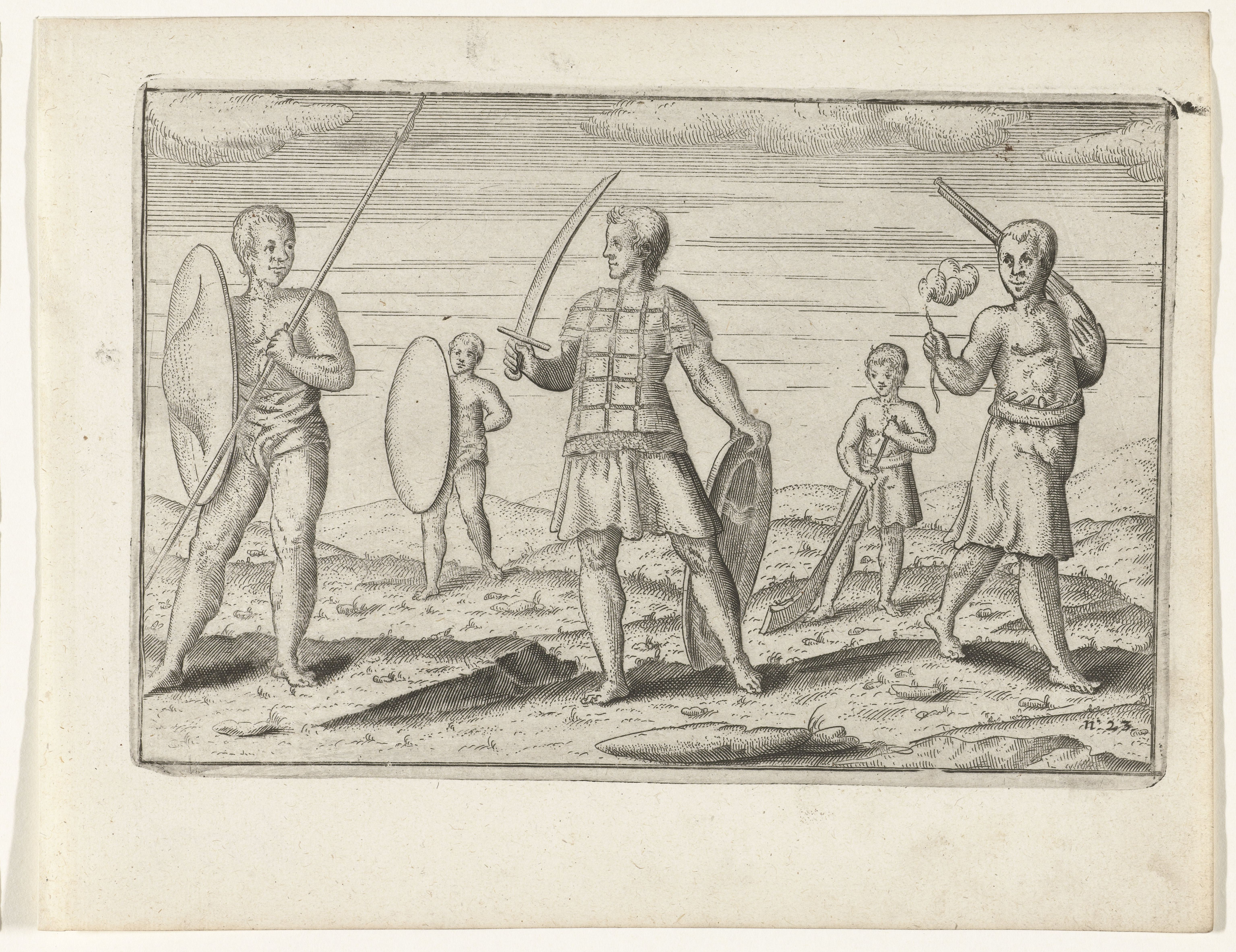
Warriors of Banten, 1596.

After conflict with the Dutch over the pepper trade in 1619, the Dutch East India Company Governor-General Jan Pieterszoon Coen took the port of Jayakarta from Banten. He founded Batavia (now Jakarta) on the ruins of this Javanese town, which became the centre of VOC operation and a serious rival for Banten, later contributing to its decline. During the middle of 17th century several conflicts between Banten and the Dutch in Batavia, just 60 miles separated along the northern coast of Java, occurred.

=== The loss of Jayakarta and the rise of Dutch Batavia ===
In 1619, the mercurial VOC Governor General J.P. Coen stormed and burnt Jayakarta to the ground and ousted Banten authority from the city. From its ashes they established the first Dutch foothold in the archipelago, the fortified port town of Batavia (now Jakarta). This new foreign-controlled town soon will become the nemesis for Banten and bears a great repercussion, not only for Banten, but upon the whole archipelago. Coen soon moved on to his next objective; to control the trade in the area by implementing a monopoly on all trading activities. In order to do this, he put into effect a blockade of the Banten harbour, which went uninterrupted for some 15 years.

In retaliation, the Banten government placed an embargo on all pepper exports to Batavia. However, as the Dutch blockade was in place, they patrolled the Bay of Banten, harassing and marauding trading ships, preventing traditional Asian traders, especially Chinese from coming to Banten. As the result, bulks of unwanted pepper sacks stockpiled and accumulated in Banten warehouses. This blockade struck a severe blow to commerce, thus pushing some Chinese merchants to move out from Banten and resettling in Batavia.

Facing this profound crisis, Prince Ranamenggala called up a great council meeting. The conclusion of this meeting is; the European were to be blame for the troubles, and to get rid of them, Banten should forfeit the commodity they coveted the most; pepper. Ranamenggala decided to pull off all the pepper plants in the region in a desperate effort to restore peace of the kingdom. This suicidal policy proved immensely disastrous for commerce as merchants suffered the biggest losses, so much so that merchants put pressure to the court that led to the resignation of Prince Ranamenggala in 1624 in favour of the heir to the throne, now coming of age, the 28 year old Abulmufakhir.

=== Abu al-Mafakhir's reign, Batavia and Mataram ===
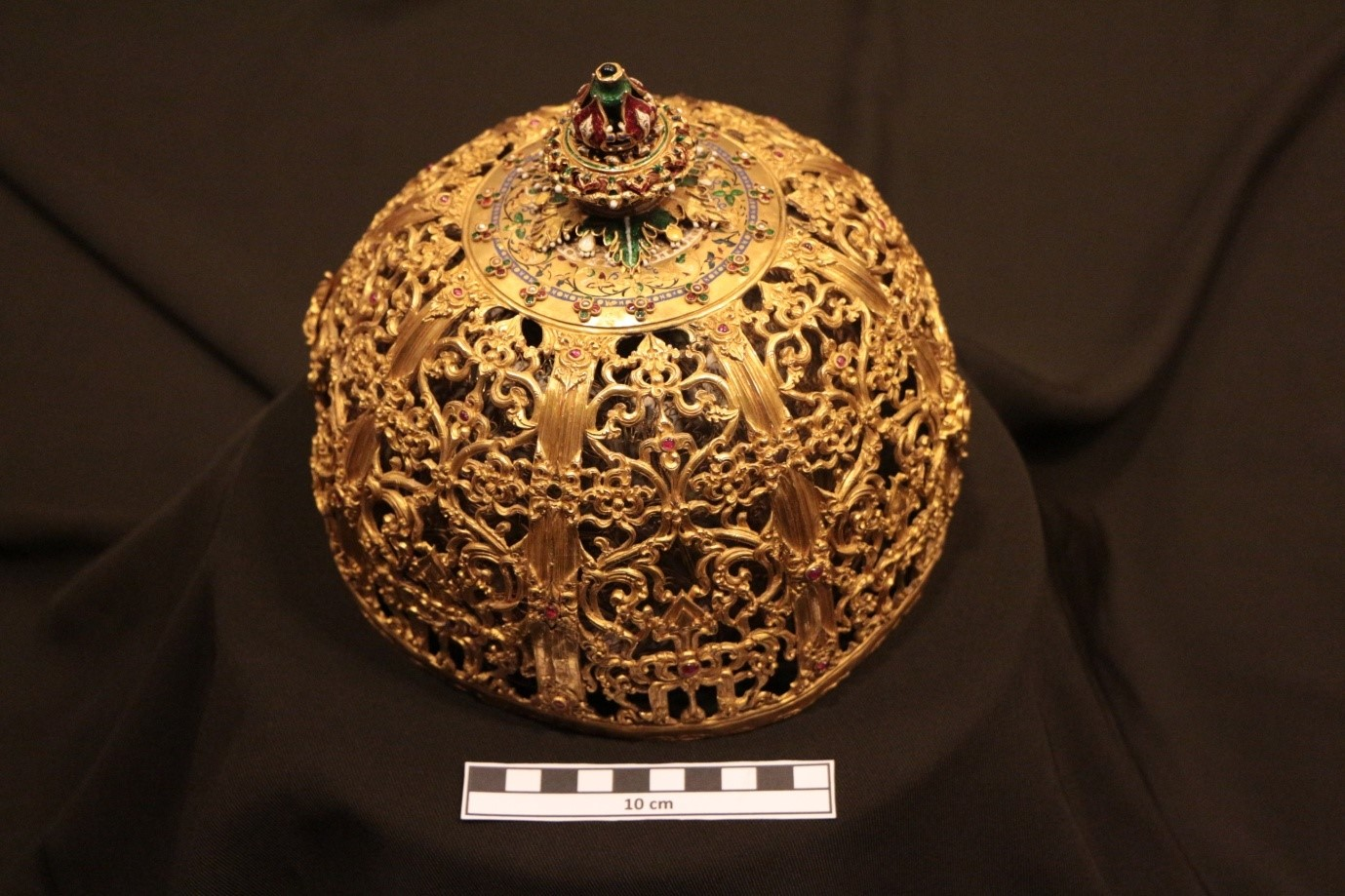
The golden crown of the Sultan of Banten

The reign of Abu al-Mufakhir Mahmud Abdulkadir is marked with an intense and vigorous relations with both Batavia and Mataram. In 1628, the English returned to Banten, which helped the commerce in Banten against their common rival, the Dutch in Batavia. Towards the end of 1620s Mataram Sultanate grew to become a dominant power in Java and was involved in power contest with Dutch East India Company (VOC), and launched sieges on Batavia twice in 1628 and 1629.

During this Javanese campaign, Banten lost Pajajaran and Priangan to Mataram. Thus in just a decade, Banten had lost two of its important settlements previously acquired from the former Kingdom of Sunda; Jayakarta to the Dutch, and Pajajaran to Mataram. Fearing the common enemy has led for both Banten and Batavia to repair their relations. Batavia feared that possible Muslim alliance would put Banten into Mataram camp, while Banten feared that their kingdom would become the next target for the ambitious Sultan Agung to unite Java. Ultimately Mataram failed to capture Batavia. Later Mataram was gradually weakened through struggle of successions of Javanese princes and Dutch involvements in internal Mataram court affair.

Between 1629 and 1631, a major agricultural project were underway; digging canals, building dams etc. to produce rice as well as a new export commodity; sugar. The English was the primary buyer, while the Chinese merchants and settlers concentrated in Kelapadua village has established possibly the first sugar plantation in Java. Sugarcane has been a familiar plant in Java since ancient times, as image of sugarcane can be found in the 9th century Borobudur bas relief. However, this was the first time that the sugar reached this large plantation scale.

In 1635 King Abu al-Mafakhir named his son Prince Pekik (Abu al-Ma'ali Ahmad) as his co-reign. In the next year a peace treaty with Batavia was signed and ratified later in 1639. In 1636, the sovereign sent envoy to Mecca for the first time, and two years later the diplomatic delegation returned with the prestigious title of "sultan" bestowed by the Grand Shareef of Mecca upon the king of Banten. This was the first sultan title officially bestowed by Mecca upon the king of Java, which much to the dismay of the powerful King Hanyokrokusumo of Mataram that subsequently also sent envoys to Mecca to acquire this much coveted honorific title of Islamic world.

The ratification of peace treaty in 1639 forced Banten to recognize the state of Batavia, forego all trade with the Moluccas, and its ships should obtain pass permit issued by Batavia. In exchange, Batavia lifted the blockade upon Banten, increased trade with Batavia, and neutrality if not Dutch assistance in the event of possible attack by Mataram in the future.

Sultan Abu al-Mafakhir implemented the decentralisation policy that allowed merchants to acquire commodities directly from Sumatran ports colony of Banten; such as Bengkulu, Silebar, Semangka, and Lampung. Having tasted a benefit of trade has encouraged these ports to be independent from Banten; Bengkulu rebelled in 1640 while Lampung rebelled in 1641 and 1644, all of them were crushed by Banten's force.

The Dutch grew mightier in the region that in 1641 manage to capture Malacca, which led to the disperse of Portuguese merchants elsewhere. Some of them find refuge in Makassar which employed by its king to generate trade in eastern Indonesia.

The 1640s was the time of peace for Banten, much appreciated by the merchants. Streams of Banten small boats sailing to Batavia supplying the Dutch city with agricultural products, from coconut oil, rattan, eggs to sugar. The English were followed by the Danish to trade in Banten; both opened trading office in Banten, established their trading ports in coastal India, and revived the once thriving trade of Indian colourful clothes. The lucrative trade with China, that once was very strong however, was not recovered since it was taken over by Batavia.

Nevertheless, the state of Banten has regained its prestige as an important trading emporium in the archipelago. As its wealth restored, Banten has established diplomatic relations with neighboring kingdoms; from Palembang, Aceh, Johor, Indragiri, Mataram, Bali, and Makassar as far as sending envoy to Coromandel coast.

The trade with English and Danish had enabled Banten to buy arms and developed troops of trained musketeers, improving city fortifications and buying cannons. In 1644 the ambassador of Mataram arrived and proposed an alliance, which was declined by Banten that now set their eyes on Cirebon. At that time Cirebon was a vassal state as well as the westernmost province of Mataram. Historically Banten and Cirebon are linked through their common ancestral founding father Sunan Gunung Jati, and Banten saw the currently weakened Cirebon as rightfully belongs within Banten's sphere of influence.

In 1650, two diplomatic missions from Mataram arrived at Banten, they demanded Banten sovereign to submit to Mataram king's suzerainty. The Great Council was held and the response was the Sultan of Banten only paid homage to one sovereign only; the Grand Shareef of Mecca. As a response for this refusal, Mataram swiftly sent a fleet of 60 ships armed troops from Cirebon to invade Banten. A naval battle took place off the coast of Tanara, midway between Banten and Batavia. The Bantenese navy took an upper hand and managed to defeat Cirebonese fleet. This naval campaign ended in disastrous defeat of Cirebon. This war is known as Pagarage war or Pacirebonan war that took place in 1650. Banten was victorious, while Cirebon-Mataram forces were vanquished.

Also in 1650, the heir apparent and also the co-reign Abu al-Ma'ali, died without ascending the throne of his father Abu al-Mafakhir. Ma'ali's son, Prince Surya, the future Sultan Ageng Tirtayasa, was chosen to be his successor. A year later in 1651, old Sultan Abu al-Mufakhir died, thus at the age of 25, Sultan Ageng replacing his grandfather and rose to become the sole sovereign of Banten.

=== Sultan Ageng Tirtayasa, the last blooming ===
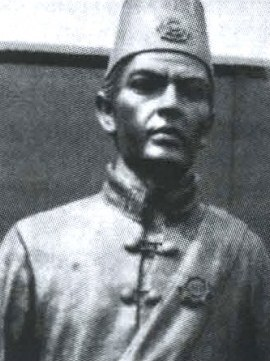
The statue of Sultan Ageng Tirtayasa

The youthful Prince Surya, who ruled as Sultan Ageng, inherited the kingdom from his grandfather in a rather favourable condition; united, prosperous and well respected. He chose his close friend Kyai Mangunjaya to be his prime minister. During his reign the Banten and Mataram Sultanates were involved in rivalry to dominate the region, while Cirebon stuck in the middle. Although Cirebon had never been attacked by Mataram, since 1619 Cirebon had been practically held under Mataram influences and behaved as the latter's vassal. The Sultan of Mataram tried once again to impose his suzerainty, albeit this time indirectly: he proposed his son the heir apparent be betrothed to Ageng's daughter, while actually intending her as a royal hostage. The proposal was declined by the Sultan of Banten.

By 1651 the Anglo-Dutch Wars erupted in Europe, which subsequently affected Batavian relations with English trading interests in Banten. The war reflected with the fierce trading competition and clashes between Dutch East India Company and British East India Company. Dutch Batavia once again imposed a blockade upon Banten, since the port was the center of British trading interest in the archipelago. This time however, Banten was quite powerful enough to resist Batavian coercion, albeit not on equal footing. Banten adopted rather indirect guerilla warfare, attacking Dutch ships on the high seas by sending fireships, also launching raids and harassing farmlands around Batavia.

Starting in 1656, the Chinese merchants of both Banten and Batavia brokered peace talks between two cities that led to the agreements three years later with the kingdom of Jambi acting as intermediary. Banten demanded the right to re-establish trade with Moluccas and the Malay Peninsula, while Batavia demanded the extradition of fugitives that found refuge in Banten. The peace treaty was signed in 1659.

Beginning in 1653 Sultan Ageng launched agricultural reform, including developing new settlements along the Cisadane River, right on the outskirts of Batavia. Thousands of acres of land were cleared and planted with coconut trees, and around twenty thousand people were transmigrated to the new settlement. The development also included lands along the north coast between Banten and Batavia. An irrigation project was conducted in Tanara between 1663 and 1664; a canal was dug as far as the Pasilyan River and connected to Cisadane. The second phase of the project in 1670-1672 was the development between Tanara and Pontang, including the construction of two canals and dams to irrigate new paddy fields being worked by ten thousand new settlers. The last phase, between 1675 and 1677, was the clearing and irrigation of lands between Banten and Anyer. The scale of the project was quite enormous, spanning from outskirts of Batavia to Anyer on the west coast of Java; 40 kilometres of canals were dug, at least 3 dams were built, more than 40,000 hectares of lands were transformed into sawah, about 30,000 people were resettled and large numbers of villages created, and two new towns were planned. In 1678 Sultan Ageng created a new palace right in the heart of the newly improved lands in Tirtayasa village. The term Tirtayasa itself means "water management" or "hydraulics", which properly describes the sultan's pride project. This new idyllic farmland abode has led to the nickname of the sultan, who was thenceforth famously known as Sultan Ageng Tirtayasa.

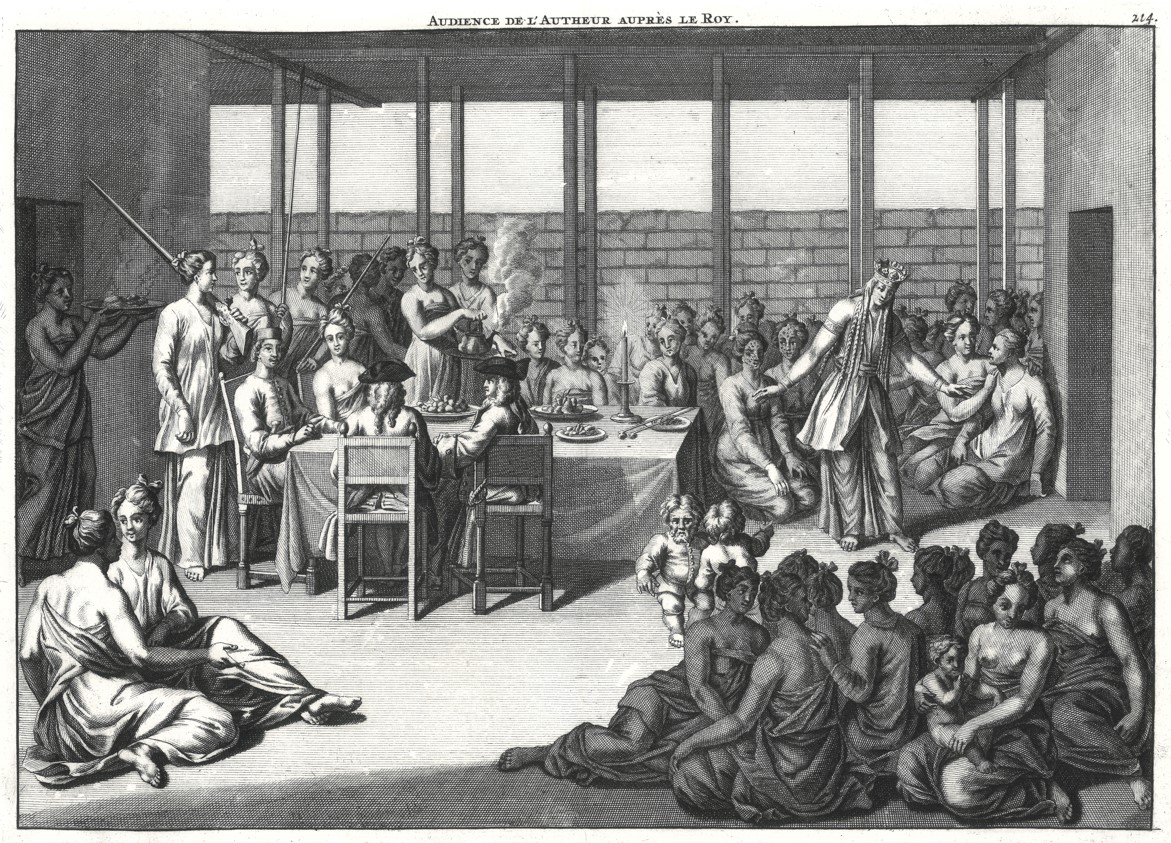
Cornelis de Bruyn at the Banten court, 1711.

By the 1660s both Batavia and Banten embarked on expansionist policy. Batavia invaded Palembang in 1659 and Makassar in 1661, while in 1661 Sultan Ageng Tirtayasa extended Banten's rule to Landak in Western Borneo. Previously Makassar, with the help of Portuguese merchants, had established trade with the Spanish in Manila, acquiring Spanish coins and silver from South America brought to the Philippines by the famed galleons of Acapulco. The Dutch invaded Makassar and demanded the expulsion of the Portuguese from the city. Soon Banten learned about this Spanish trade and picked up what Makassar had left. Starting in 1663, Banten trading ships laden with pepper and other commodities sailed to Manila every year and acquired Spanish cash. Ageng established trade with Spanish Manila for silver and built canals for coconut palm and sugar plantations, among other developments.

Sultan Ageng appointed a Chinese man named Kaytsu as the minister of foreign trade, who was also the syahbandar (port master) of Banten. Acquiring the sultan's confidence, he was a man of exceptional talent and vision to boost the Banten economy by creating Banten's own fleet of trading ships. Previously, Banten just took the role as trading port, while the active commerce role was played by entrepreneur merchants and trading companies. Having English traders as consultants, the syahbandar built ships and recruited crew, both locals and of foreign origin, to create a trading fleet modelled after the European model. The new European ships were ordered from an English-owned shipwright in Rembang near the teak wood producing area in northern Java, while some secondhand ships were acquired from Moorish, Japanese and European traders. By the 1660s Banten was able to compete with European companies for trade in the Indian Ocean and the South China Sea. In 1666 Banten junks sailed for Tonkin, reestablishing the ancient trade link with mainland China. Banten was able to trade directly with Mecca, Gujarat, the Coromandel coast, Bengal, Siam, Cambodia, Vietnam, China, Taiwan and Japan, and also set up factories in Surat and even London.

The closure of regional free trading ports and the free trade policy made Banten attractive for trading nations. During the early years of Sultan Ageng's reign only the English and the Dutch had a permanent trading post in Banten. Towards 1670 they were joined by Danish, French, Portuguese Macao, and Chinese from Amoy and Taiwan. Moreover, the English, Danish and Portuguese trading ships from India revived the archipelagic trade with Coromandel coast, as large numbers of Indian traders returned to Banten to sell their fabrics.

As the economy prospered, so did the political influence. Official letters were exchanged with the rulers of England, Denmark, France, Portuguese Goa and Macao, Arabia, China, Japan, Siam and Cambodia. Diplomatic missions were sent to England and Arabia, the sultan's son was sent to Mecca on Banten's own ship. The shining prestige of the Banten court throughout the archipelago led regional rulers to ask Banten for help and intervention in particular matters, such as Banten involvement in Cirebon's political affair.

By that time, Banten enjoyed a favourable relation with Cirebon. On the other hand, Cirebon relations with their suzerain, Mataram, were strained. The tension culminated with the execution of Cirebon King Panembahan Girilaya in Plered, while the Cirebon princes were taken as the hostage in Mataram. Prince Wangsakerta of Cirebon went to Banten to seek Sultan Ageng Tirtayasa's help in freeing his brothers. Tirtayasa agreed to assist Cirebon and saw it as an opportunity to raise Banten's influence upon Cirebon. Using the opportunity of the Trunojoyo rebellion against Mataram, Sultan Ageng Tirtayasa secretly supported the revolt and managed to weaken Mataram and save the two Cirebon princes.

In 1677 Tirtayasa succeeded in having the princes of Cirebon, previously being held as hostage in Mataram, brought to Banten. However, Sultan Ageng Tirtayasa saw an opportunity to impose Banten's influence upon Cirebon. He crowned both princes he saved as the sultans, Prince Mertawijaya as Sultan Kasepuhan and Prince Kertawijaya as Sultan Kanoman. By doing so the Sultan of Banten disintegrated and weakened the Sultanate of Cirebon into several petty states. On the other hand, Prince Wangsakerta, who had fought for 10 years, was only given a small title and estate. The cunning divide strategy was meant to weaken Cirebon and to prevent Cirebon from being Mataram's ally and becoming a menace to Banten in the future, as it had done in Pagarage War. In the 1670s he practically acquired the Cirebon area as vassal following a civil war in Mataram.

Batavia, however, could not afford to see Banten emerge and become too powerful. Allying themselves with Mataram, the Dutch waged two years of war and forced Banten to give up their control of Cirebon. Defeated and disappointed, Sultan Ageng retreated to his estate in Tirtayasa and withdrew from government affairs, leaving his son, the co-sovereign Sultan Haji, in charge.

=== Civil war of father and son ===
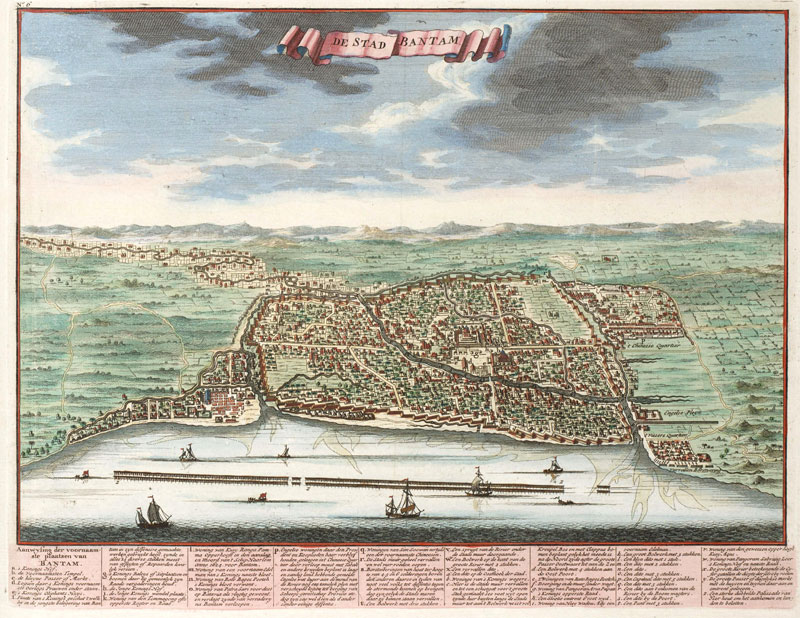
De Stad Bantam, engraving by François Valentijn, Amsterdam, 1726

Palace disputes erupted between Sultan Ageng Tirtayasa and his son and co-sovereign Sultan Haji. Sultan Ageng wished to maintain a policy of free-trade with all European powers, but his son wanted close relations with the Dutch in Batavia. Ageng's independence is shown in the letter to the Danish king mentioned above, offering to trade pepper from Banten for firearms and gunpowder.

Unlike his valiant father however, Sultan Haji were reluctant to continue the fight and sought to make peace with Batavia. Sultan Haji, angered by criticism of his new political policy from court officials loyal to his father, demanded the removal of Prime Minister Mangunjaya from the court. Old Sultan Tirtayasa to demonstrate his support for his son, and in an effort to avoid any conflict, agreed for the exile of his political mentor, only to learn that several weeks later his loyal long standing friend has been murdered.

In 1682, angered by the death of his loyal friend Prime Minister Mangunjaya, the king rode out from his retirement estate in Tirtayasa back to the royal city of Banten, determined to take over reins of power from his son, he and his loyal officials stormed the palace.

The young Sultan retreated and took refuge in a fortress which two years earlier he had built within Banten Palace according to the plan drew by Hendrik Lucasz Cardeel, a renegade Dutchman that become Sultan Haji's advisor. Trapped inside his fortress, Sultan Haji's fate seems sealed when, however, he managed to send a message to Batavia urging the Dutch to intervene immediately. Indeed, Cardeel's influence was crucial in Sultan Haji decision to appeal for Dutch intervention.

The Dutch were only too happy to learn about the crisis within their rival's palace. They saw an opportunity to gain control upon Banten politics, and acted swiftly by dispatching the Dutch fleet to rescue the trapped young Sultan. Sultan Haji was freed by the Dutch, while his father and his loyal men retreated to the interior of the land to reorganize their struggle against Sultan Haji and the Dutch. Civil war ensued for several years to come.

With Sultan Haji allied with the VOC, a war broke out between Batavia and Banten in the 1680s. After a year, the old Sultan Ageng Tirtayasa was forced to surrender. He was held as a prisoner first in Banten, later in Batavia when he died there in 1692. In return for their help, the Dutch demanded Sultan Haji to sign some detrimental agreements; the expulsion of all foreigners from Banten, the Dutch monopoly on pepper trade, and the right to establish a Dutch garrison in Banten. Subsequently, the Dutch had the Banten fortification torn down, and they built Fort Speelwijk right on the entrance of the port.

The result of civil war and Batavia involvement was disastrous for Banten: the VOC gained Bogor and Priangan Highlands (now West Java) and reduced Banten's power substantially, making it a protectorate of the VOC. Although nominally independent, its power was gone.

In the following years, despite occasional uprisings, Banten was forced to follow Batavia's order and was reduced to become a protectorate or a client state. Banten's influence overseas also waned, substantially. In 1752, the Dutch annexed territories on western Borneo and southern Sumatra formerly held by Banten.

=== Decline and fall of Banten ===
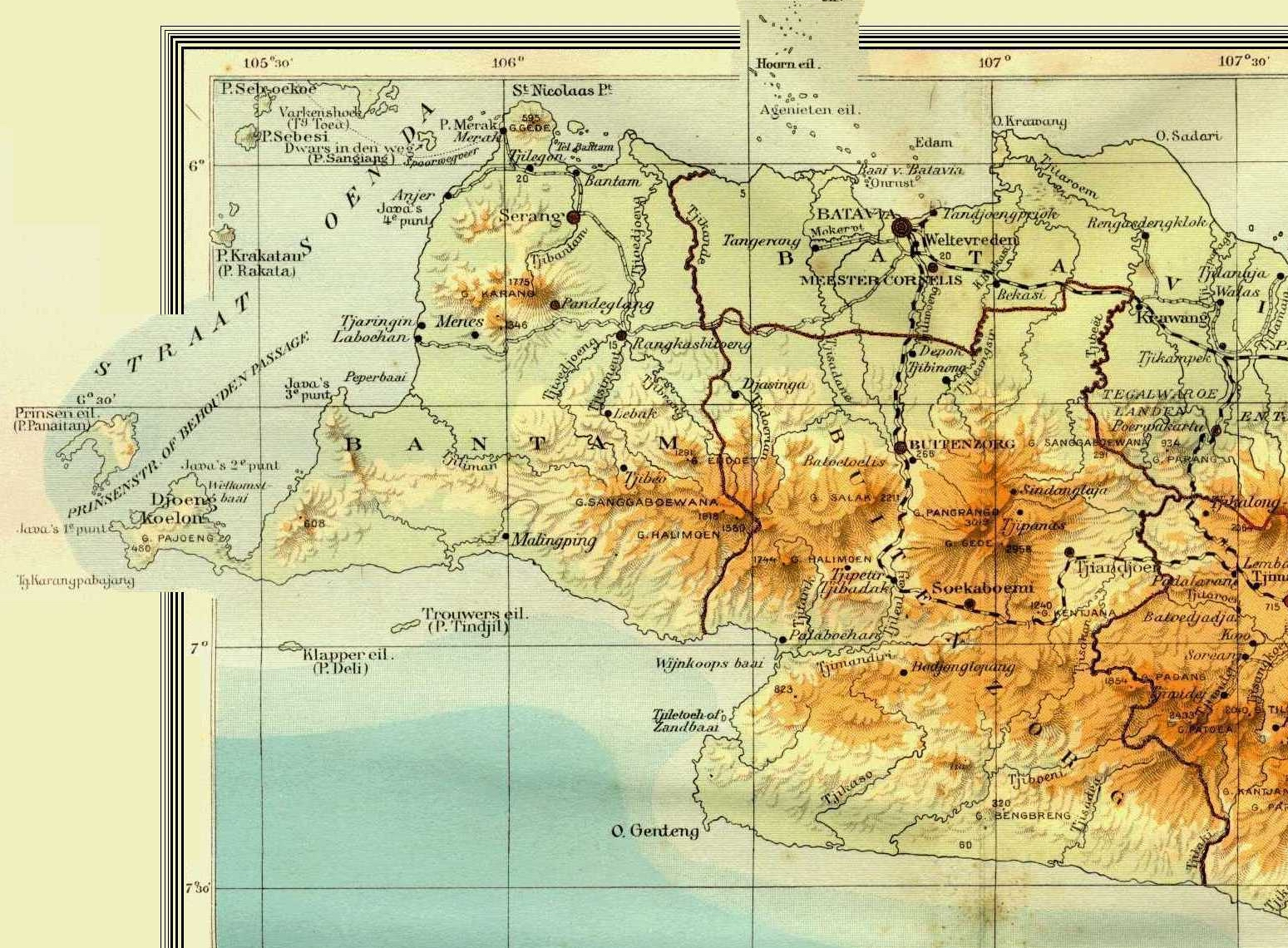
Banten Residency after annexation to Dutch East Indies, with neighbouring Batavia (now Jakarta) and Buitenzorg (now Bogor)

After the reign of Sultan Haji in the late 17th century, Banten was overshadowed by the neighboring port city of Batavia. There was much palace intrigues during the reign of Sultan Zainul Arifin (r. 1733–48) when his Arab wife Ratu Sarifa engineered a conflict between him and the crown prince which resulted in the latter being exiled and Ratu Sarifa's nephew instead being named the crown prince, however he was too young to rule. Meanwhile Zainul Arifin was showing signs of insanity and was exiled by his wife with the help of the VOC in 1748. Ratu Sarifa was now made regent and she managed to sideline many nobles and commoners alike, she teamed up with VOC in 1750 where their 800 men was defeated by Kyai Tapa, later another force of 460 was again defeated by 7,000 Banten rebels. Eventually even Ratu Sarifa and her nephew was exiled by the VOC to Edam Island and she died in 1751.

Zainul Arifin's brother Adi Santika took the throne but Kyai Tapa's rebellion was still ongoing, he burnt European plantations in the Batavian highlands, he made more attacks on the VOC in the Sunda Strait, Bandung and Buitenzorg, eventually he was noted as being involved in the Third Javanese War of Succession further east and was never heard of again. When Zainul Asyikin, Zainul Arifin's son, was brought back from exile in Ceylon, he ruled under the dominance of the VOC from 1753 until 1777, the kingdom was treated as a client state or protectorate of VOC.

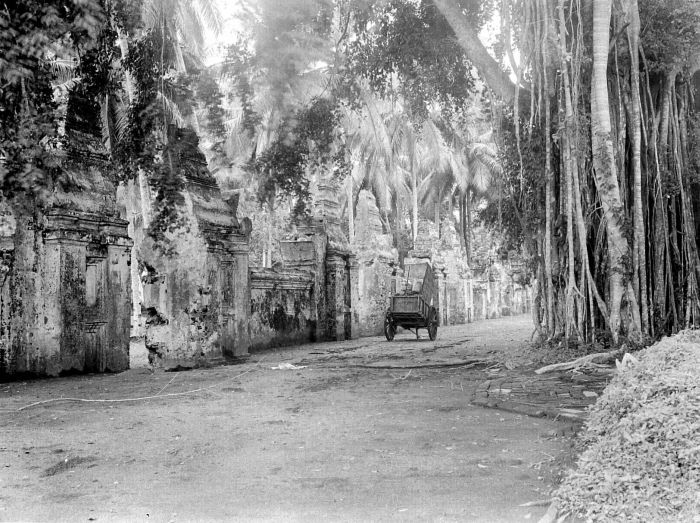
The ruins of Kaibon palace, the former residence of Banten Sultan's queen mother

By 1800, a major change occurred; the Dutch East India Company went bankrupt, and its possessions were nationalized by the Netherlands as their colony, the Dutch East Indies. In 1808 Herman Willem Daendels, Governor-General of the Dutch East Indies in 1808–1810, commissioned the construction of Great Post Road to defend Java from incoming British invasion. Daendels ordered Sultan Aliyuddin II of Banten to move the capital to Anyer and to provide labour to build a new port planned to be built at Ujung Kulon. The Sultan refused Daendels' command, and in response Daendels ordered the invasion of Banten and destruction of Surosowan palace. The Sultan, together with his family, was arrested in Puri Intan and held as a prisoner in Fort Speelwijk, and later sent into exile in Ambon.

On 22 November 1808, Daendels declared from his headquarters in Serang that the Sultanate of Banten had been absorbed into the territory of the Dutch East Indies. In 1813 the Banten Sultanate ceased to exist when Thomas Stamford Raffles forced Sultan Muhamad Syafiuddin to give up his throne. This was the final blow that marked the end of Sultanate of Banten.

== Economy ==
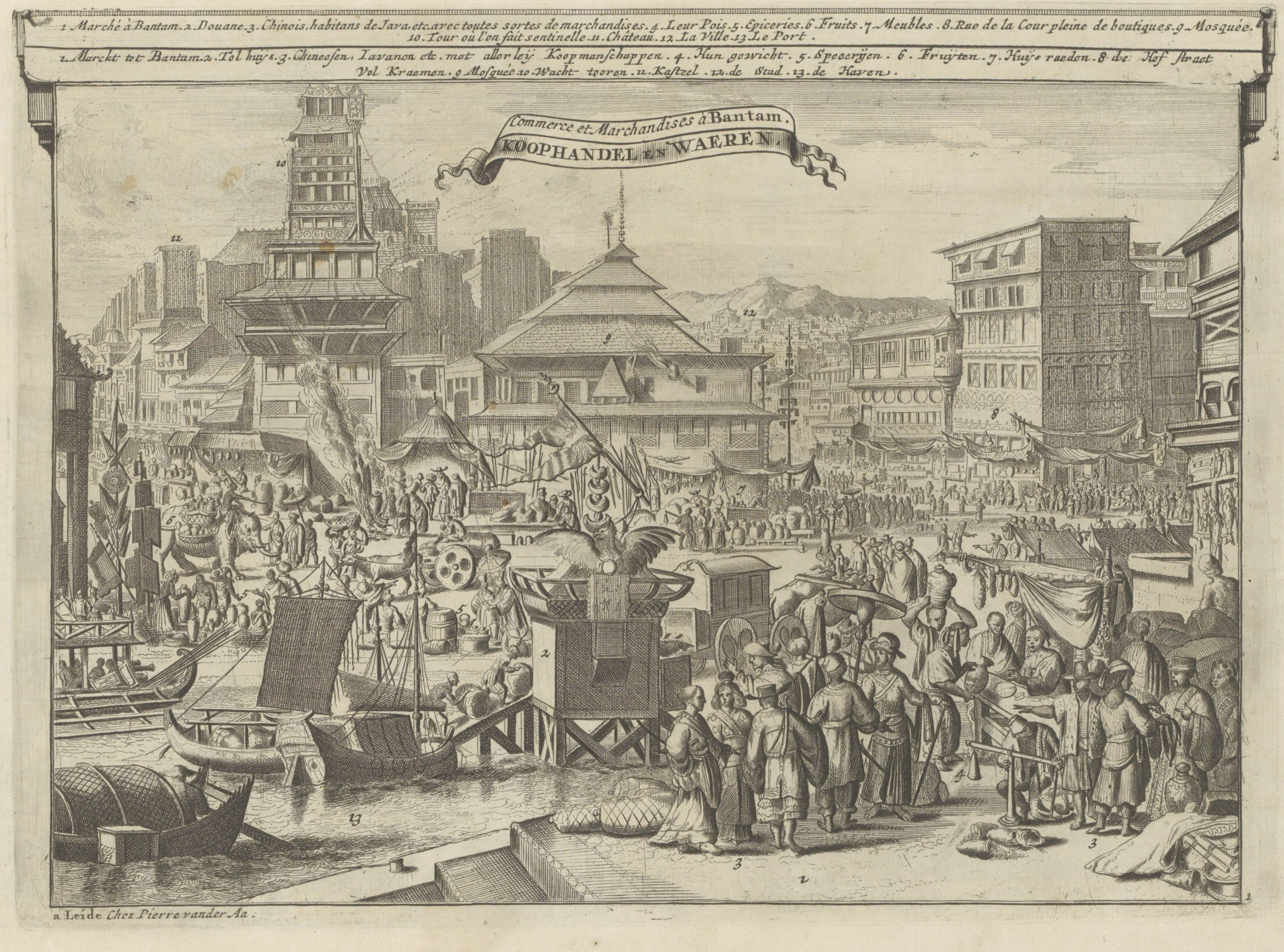
Market trade in Bantam, circa 17th-18th century.

The sultanate's economy was built mainly upon its most important commodity; pepper, thus its international trade mainly consists of this product. At least since the 13th century, the Chinese record Zhu Fan Zhi mentioned that area of both sides of Sunda Strait with its main port of Sin-t'o (Sunda) – which probably refer to the port of Banten, was famous as the producer of excellent pepper. It was one of the main commodities of its predecessor, the ancient Kingdom of Sunda; and the Muslim Banten simply took over the established pepper trade of its Hindu predecessor. Indeed, it was pepper that attracted foreign traders to Banten; from Chinese, Moors, to Portuguese, Dutch, English and Danish merchants has established their export-import business in the port city.

Traders coming from China, India, Turkey, Portugal, England, Denmark and the Netherlands were frequent visitors to the Banten harbour. Spices, silk, Chinese ceramics, gold, jewellery and other Asian goods attracted European merchants. Banten was a pioneer in international trade.

Danish merchants also arrived from Tranquebar, in search of pepper. The trade relation is evident in two letters written by Sultan Ageng Tirtayasa to Frederick III of Denmark.

== Religion ==
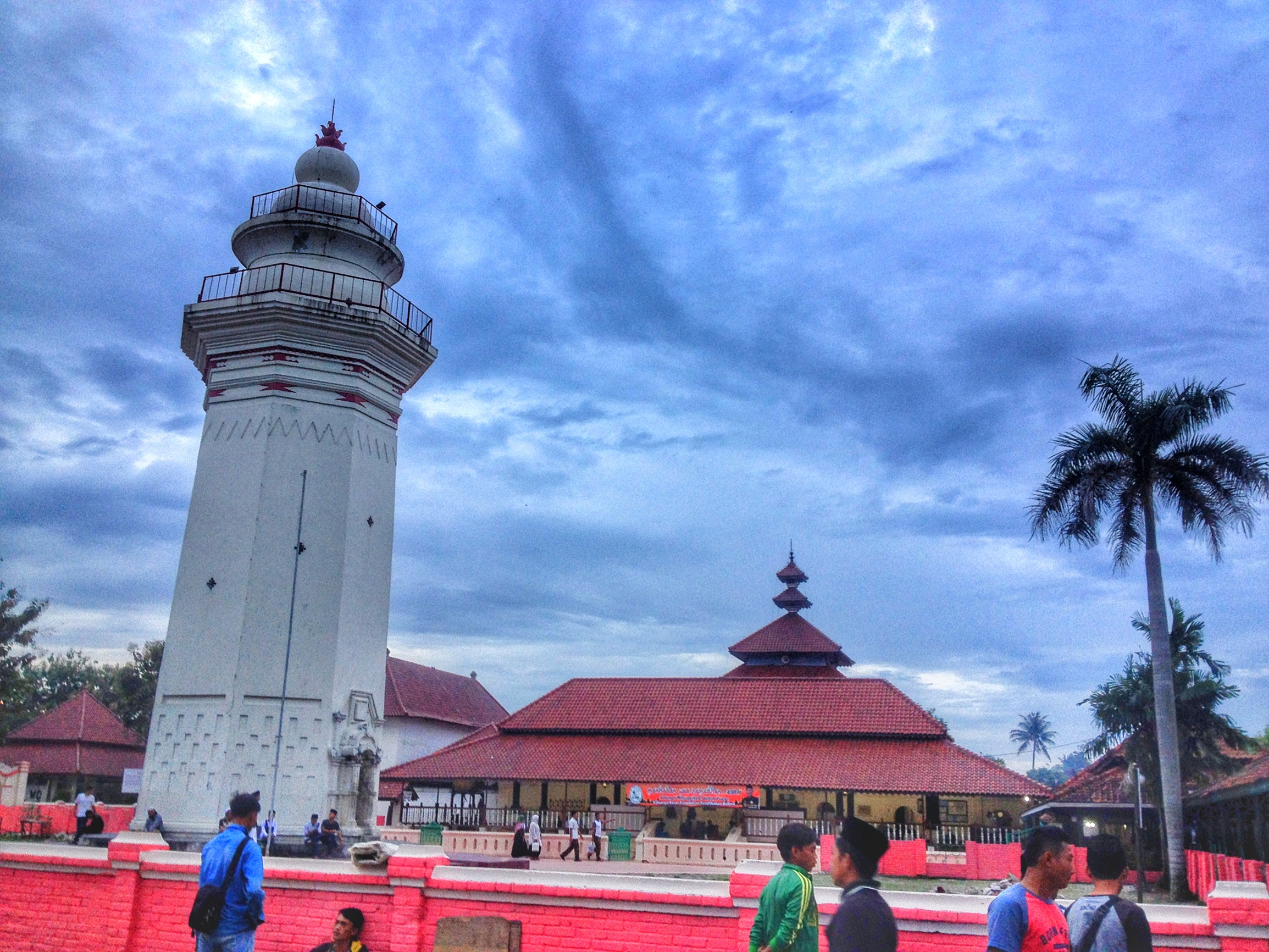
The Great Mosque of Banten, the remnant of Banten Sultanate, a popular destination for Indonesian Muslims.

The desire to spread the faith of Islam was possibly one of the main reason behind Demak's decision to capture Banten in 1527, and supplant the ancient Hindu Sunda Kingdom with a new Islamic kingdom. Although, a more pragmatic reason was more possible; a geopolitical move to prevent Muslim's rival; the Catholic Christian Portuguese in Malacca to ever established their base in Java. The role of Muslim proselytizers that targeted the ruling class was also an instrumental action that contributed to the spread of Islam in Indonesian archipelago around the 15th century. At that time, Islam also benefited as being the predominant faith of the Asian merchant class, that established their trading network from the coasts of Arabia, India, all the way to Indonesia.

However, to suggest that Islam spread within Western Java as an entirely peaceful process is inaccurate as the capture of Banten Girang, Kalapa, and later Pajajaran of Sunda Kingdom was achieved by military means. It was said that the Sundanese prisoners were spared only if they converted to Islam. Nevertheless, the kings of Banten demonstrated their tolerance by not interfering and forcing the native inlanders Baduy people to convert to Islam, thus allowing these former Sundanese subjects to retain their ancient faith and way of life up until today. The sovereign of Banten was known to keep a regiment of bodyguard consisting of these non-Muslim "highlanders" mercenaries. The kings of Banten also allowed the construction of Chinese folk temples and Christian churches for merchants.

Banten was also known as an educational centre for Islamic studies. Indeed, Islam was the main component of Bantenese civilization. Islamic religious ceremonies, festivals and also Islamic customs – the prince's circumcision for example, were observed faithfully and held in such great importance and festivities. After the sultan, the qadi or religious judge of Banten, also holds authoritative power and enjoyed important position within Banten's court. Numbers of ulamas hailed from India and Arabia were invited to Banten to spread their knowledge in religious matters. The pesantren religious school were established in the kingdom, with the pesantren of Kasunyatan was among the most prestigious one, established south of the city in the 16th century under the patronage of king Maulana Muhammad and was led by the king's own religious teacher.

Among Islamic scholars in Banten was Sheikh Yusuf. He was a scholar from Makassar who worked under Sultan Ageng Tirtayasa. Sultan Ageng also sent Banten's first ocean-going ship to the port of Jeddah to take his son in his pilgrimage to Mecca, thus made Sultan Haji as the first sovereign in the archipelago to ever go on a hajj pilgrim. These actions demonstrate a symbolic gesture that Banten holds an important prestige within the larger ummah or Islamic community.

By the 19th century, the majority of Indonesian scholars that study and even teach in Mecca were of Banten origin; such as Sheikh Nawawi al-Bantani, the teacher of Arsyad Thawil al-Bantani. He was a native of Tanara that wrote several works in Arabic and taught as a professor in Mecca and became the imam of the Great Mosque of Mecca. This religious prestige has made Banten – together with Aceh, a sense of belonging within the larger Islamic ummah, and made the kingdom as one of the prominent Islamic polity in the archipelago.

== Culture ==
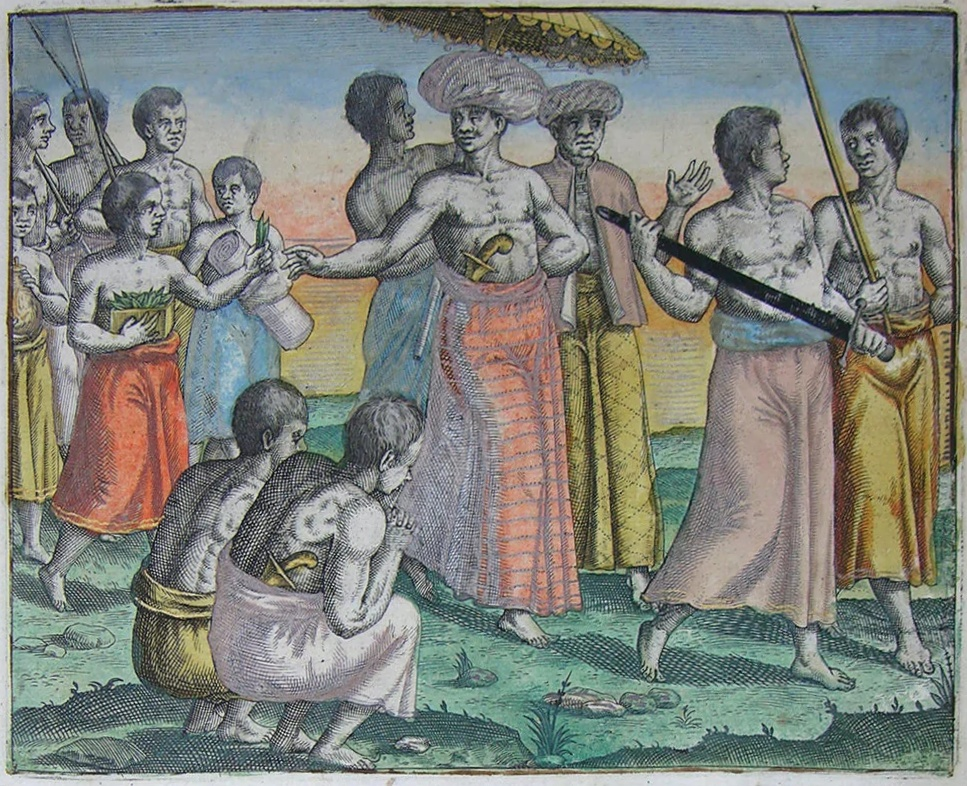
Nobleman in Banten, de Bry c. 1599

Attesting to Bantam's renown in Europe is Henry Fielding's play The Author's Farce at whose conclusion the protagonist's problems are neatly solved when he is suddenly informed that he is "The Prince of Bantam", and that as the old "King of Bantam" has died he is to inherit the throne. Fielding and his London audience clearly conceived of "Bantam" as a prosperous country of which it was a great fortune to become the monarch.

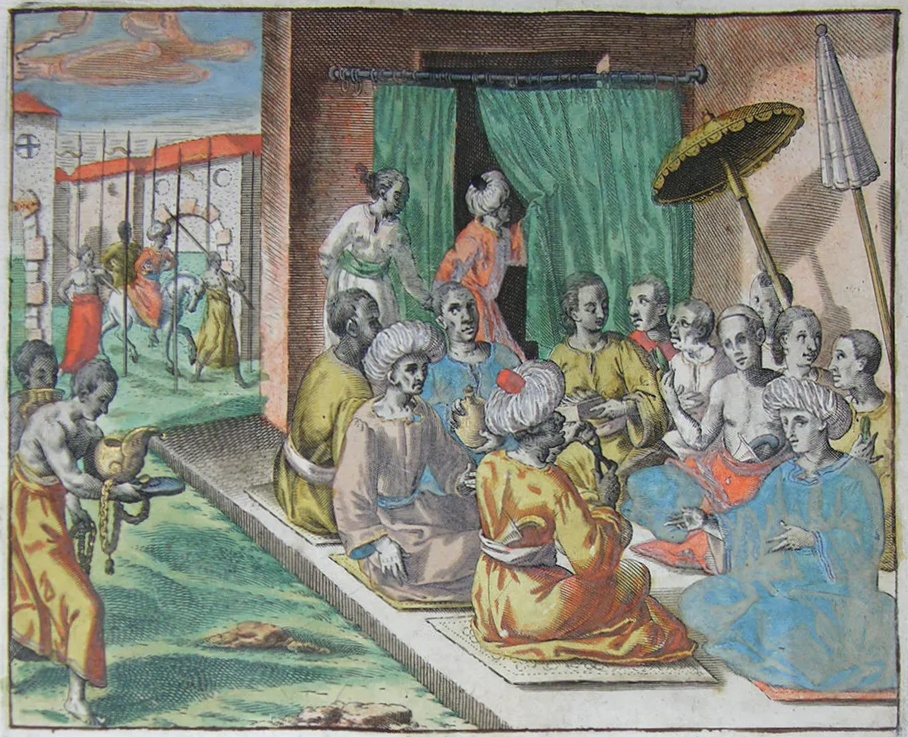
Wedding in Banten, de Bry

Religious tolerance in Banten is well developed. Although dominated by Muslims, certain communities were allowed to build their facilities of worship, where around 1673 several temples had been established in the area around the port of Banten.

Around 1676 thousands of Chinese people sought asylum and worked in Banten. This wave of migration was due to the outbreak of war in Fujian and other areas of South China. These communities generally build settlements around the coasts and rivers and have a significant proportion of the Indian and Arab communities . Meanwhile in Banten several European community groups such as Britain, the Netherlands, France, Denmark and Portugal have also built lodgings and warehouses around Ci Banten.

== List of sultans of Banten ==
- Syarif Hidayatullah or Sunan Gunung Jati from Sultanate of Cirebon
1. Sultan Maulana Hasanuddin or Prince Sabakinking 1552 – 1570
2. Sultan Maulana Yusuf or Prince Pasareyan 1570 – 1585
3. Sultan Maulana Muhammad or Prince Sedangrana 1585 – 1596
4. Sultan Abu al-Mafakhir Mahmud Abdulkadir or Pangeran Ratu 1596 – 1647
5. Sultan Abu al-Ma'ali Ahmad 1647 – 1651
6. Sultan Abu al-Fath Abdul Fattah or Sultan Ageng Tirtayasa 1651 – 1683
7. Sultan Abu Nashar Abdul Qahar or Sultan Haji 1683 – 1687
8. Sultan Abu Fadhl Muhammad Yahya 1687 – 1690
9. Sultan Abu al-Mahasin Muhammad Zainul Abidin 1690 – 1733
10. Sultan Abu al-Fathi Muhammad Syifa Zainul Arifin 1733 – 1750
  1. Sultan Syarifuddin Ratu Wakil, in effect Ratu Syarifah Fatimah 1750 – 1751
11. Sultan Abu al-Ma'ali Muhammad Wasi Zainal Alimin or Pangeran Arya Adisantika 1751 – 1753
12. Sultan Arif Zainul Asyiqin al-Qadiri 1753 – 1777
13. Sultan Abu al-Mafakhir Muhammad Aliuddin 1777 – 1799
14. Sultan Abu al-Fath Muhammad Muhyiddin Zainussalihin 1799 – 1801
15. Sultan Abu al-Nashar Muhammad Ishaq Zainulmutaqin 1801 – 1802
  1. Caretaker Sultan Wakil Pangeran Natawijaya 1802 – 1803
16. Sultan Abu al-Mafakhir Muhammad Aliyuddin II 1803 – 1808
  1. Caretaker Sultan Wakil Pangeran Suramenggala 1808 – 1809
17. Sultan Muhammad ibn Muhammad Muhyiddin Zainussalihin 1809 – 1813

== See also ==
- History of Indonesia
- List of Sunni Muslim dynasties
- List of monarchs of Java
