= Azmatkhan =

Hadharem family

Al Azmatkhan/Azmatkhan
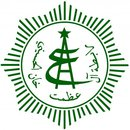
- Logo Rabithah Azhamatkhan
- Current region: Almost all over the world
- Etymology: Azhamat (Glorious) Khan (Family)

Al Azmatkhan'/Azmatkhan' (Arabic: عظمة خان, romanized: Aẓama[t] Khān) al-Husayni, also spelled Azmat Khan, Azhmatkhan, al-Azhamatkhan or al-Azhamat Chan (Urdu: عظمت خان) are a family originating in Hadhramaut. They trace their lineage to Sayyid Abd al-Malik Azmatkhan ibn Alawi Ammul Faqih, a descendant of Husayn ibn Ali. Sayyid Abd al-Malik emigrated from Hadhramaut to India in the 14th century AD, earlier than other emigrations from Hadhramaut.

al-Husayni later married a daughter of Nasirabad nobility and acquired Azmat Khan title. Khan title was given in order to consider him as the local nobility. In addition, they put "Azmat" which means "noble" because Abd al-Malik was originated from sayyid lineage. His descendants still retain this name as their patronymic until today.

His descendants spread to Pattani, Cambodia, Malay, Indonesia and Philippines among the Sultanate of Sulu, Maguindanao and Lanao. Malaysian Asyraf Union records that Sunan Gresik, the foremost Sufi saint of Wali Sanga, was a descendant of Abd al-Malik al-Azmatkhan. Since he was father of Sunan Ampel and grandfather of Sunan Bonang, then most of Wali Sanga were of Azmatkhan's descent.

In order to record and keep genealogy of Azmatkhan family, Rabithah Azmatkhan was founded. Rabithah Azmatkhan eventually prompted the formation of Rabithah Fatimiyah in 2010, a similar organization which aims to record genealogy of every descendant of Fatimah Az-Zahra, Muhammad's daughter and the mother of all sayyids.

== See also ==
- Ba 'Alawi sada
- Hadhrami
- Alavi (surname)
- Al-Rabithah al-Alawiyyah
- Descendants of Ali ibn Abi Talib
- Hadhrami people
- Sayyid
- Sharif
- Wali Sanga
