= Tambakbaya =

- Village
- Location in Java
- Coordinates: 6.366064°S 106.196296°E
- Country: Indonesia
- Province: Banten
- Regency: Lebak
- District: Cibadak

Population (2010)
  - Total: 5,469

Tambakbaya is a village in the Banten province on the island of Java, Indonesia.

== Location ==
Tambakbaya is in the district of Cibadak in the Lebak Regency in Banten. As of 2010 the village had a population of 5,469.

== Historical ==
In 1813 Java was under British control and the land was being leased rather than subject to forced deliveries and contingents as it had been under the Dutch. Major Udney Yule, the British resident, was instructed by Stamford Raffles to grant equitable and moderate leases to the renter class. All the half-yearly rents in the Bantam Residency due on 1 July 1813 were paid on time apart from those due from Pontang, Tanara, Tambakbaya and Trate(?). In this area a drought had caused the rice crop to fail entirely.

== Sources ==
- Bastin, John (1960), "The Working of the Early Land Rent System in West Java", Bijdragen tot de Taal-, Land- en Volkenkunde, 116 (3), Deel: Brill, JSTOR 27860245
- Population of Indonesia by Village: Result of 2010 Population Census (PDF), Central Bureau of Statistics (BPS – Statistics Indonesia), archived from the original (PDF) on 2015-02-07
