= Ci Banten =

River in Indonesia

Ci Banten Cipeteh
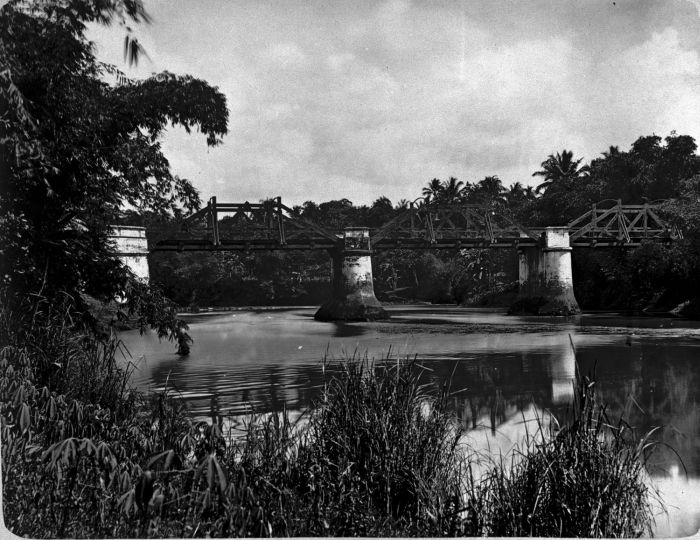
- Railway bridge over the river – early 20th century

Location
- Country: Indonesia
- Provinsi: Banten

Physical characteristics
- Source: Gunung Karang
  - location: Serang Regency
  - coordinates: 6°16′07″S 106°02′57″E
- Mouth: Banten Bay, Java Sea
  - location: Karangantu, Serang
  - coordinates: 6°01′40″S 106°10′30″E
- Basin size: 281 km^{2} (108 sq mi)

Basin features
- River system: Cibanten basin
- Landmarks: Keraton Kaibon; Great Mosque of Banten; The Tomb of Maulana Yusuf; Tasik ardi Lake
- Cities: Serang
- Bridges: Karang Serang bridge
- Basin management authority: BPDAS Citarum-Ciliwung

The Ci Banten, or Ci Peteh, is a river in Banten province on the island of Java, Indonesia.

The rivers in Banten, the westernmost province of Java, run roughly parallel to each other. The main rivers are the Peteh, called the Banten on the lower reaches near the city of Kota Banten; the Ujung, which enters the sea at Pontang; the Durian, which enters the sea at Tanara; the Manceuri; and the Sadane, which rises in the mountainous region of Priyangan and in 1682 formed the border between the Dutch East India Company (VOC) territory and Batavia (modern Jakarta).

== Geography ==
The river flows in the southwest area of Java with a predominantly tropical rainforest climate (designated as Af in the Köppen–Geiger climate classification). The annual average temperature in the area is 25 °C. The warmest month is October in which the average temperature is around 28 °C, and the coldest is January, at 24 °C. The average annual rainfall is 3471 mm. The wettest month is February with an average of 429 mm of rainfall, and the driest is September, with 116 mm of rainfall.

== See also ==
- Banten Sultanate
- Great Mosque of Banten
- Port of Merak
- Krakatau Steel
- List of drainage basins of Indonesia

== Sources ==
- Talens, Johan (1999), Een feodale samenleving in koloniaal vaarwater: staatsvorming, koloniale expansie en economische onderontwikkeling in Banten, West Java (1600–1750) (in Dutch), Uitgeverij Verloren, ISBN 90-6550-067-7
