= Great Post Road =

Historical road in Java, Indonesia constructed in the early 19th century

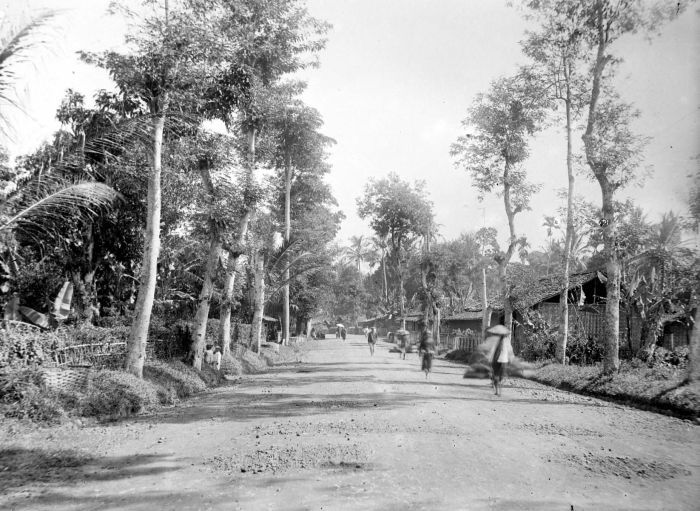
Part of the Great Post Road in Kampung Cibabat, Cimahi, West Java during the colonial period

The Great Post Road (Indonesian: Jalan Raya Pos, Dutch: De Grote Postweg) is the name for the historical road that runs across Java and connects Anyer with Panarukan. It was built during the administration of Herman Willem Daendels (1808–1811), governor-general of the Dutch East Indies, using unpaid forced labour that cost thousands of lives.

== Construction ==
The Great Post Road spans from Anjer (Anyer) to Panaroecan (Panarukan).

La Grande Route, as Daendels called it, was a military road built by the order of King Louis Bonaparte, who ruled the Kingdom of Holland during the Napoleonic Wars. France was at war with the United Kingdom of Great Britain and Ireland, and the road was intended to support the defence of Java by, e.g. making it easier to transfer soldiers and supplies. In 1750, before the road was constructed, connections existed between Batavia (present-day Jakarta) and Semarang and onwards to Surabaya. A north-south connection between Semarang, Surakarta and onwards to Yogyakarta was also available then. However, heavy tropical rainfall frequently destroyed them.

When he started road construction in the Dutch East Indies, Daendels faced difficult conditions. The colony's financial situation was so tight that the minister of colonial affairs in The Hague sent him a letter emphasizing the need to reduce expenditures. The British posed a major threat. Furthermore, there were uprisings in Bantam and Cirebon, and some of Daendels' opponents actively frustrated his endeavours.

Daendels then decided to use Javanese unpaid forced labourers to perform most of the heavy work, which resulted in thousands of deaths due to the difficult health challenges of the forests and marshes as well as the labour conditions. Many of Daendels' opponents became historical sources of the harsh conditions during the road construction. Major William Thorn wrote that about 12,000 natives are said to have perished during the construction. Nicolaus Engelhard, who was a governor over most of Java and who had to give up his position to Daendels, stated that 500 workers had died in the Megamendung area near Buitenzorg (the present-day Bogor), excluding the number of people who died as the result of illness. Furthermore, Engelhard criticized Daendels for the thousand casualties resulting from the road construction in the woods of Weleri in the Pekalongan region.

== Extent ==
Today, the present Javanese North Coast Road (Indonesian: Jalan Pantura, abbreviation from "Pantai Utara") mostly follows the Java Great Post Road. However, the original post road runs through the Preanger (Priangan, West Java) highlands, from Meester Cornelis (Jatinegara) south to Buitenzorg (Bogor), and east to Cianjur, Bandung, Sumedang, and Cirebon. The current north coast road, however, runs through coastal northern West Java and was built after the construction of Daendels' post road. It connects Bekasi, Karawang, and Cirebon. The road originally ran from Anyer, present-day Banten, but formerly West Java, to Panarukan, East Java, but later was extended to Banyuwangi. Currently, the Java main road extends through five provinces: Banten, DKI Jakarta, West Java, Central Java, and East Java.

== Cities ==
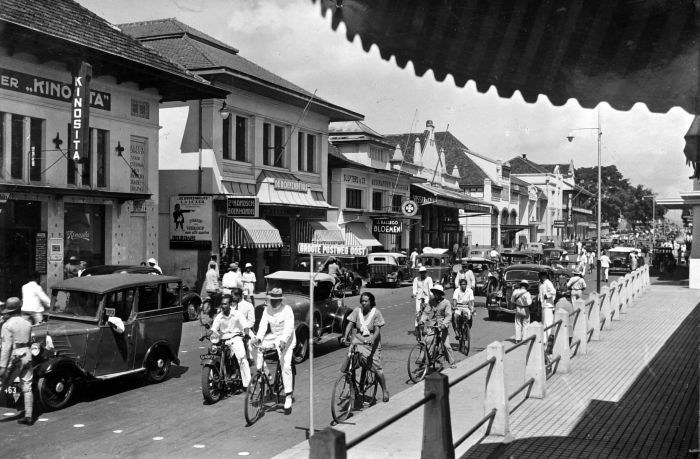
The Great Post Road running through Bandung in 1938 (today Jalan Asia-Afrika)

The road initially served as the backbone of Java's transportation and logistics. It connects some of the largest cities in Java, including Anyer, Cilegon, Serang, Tangerang, Batavia, Meester Cornelis (today absorbed into Jakarta), Buitenzorg (now Bogor), Cianjur, Bandung, Sumedang, Cirebon, Brebes, Tegal, Pemalang, Pekalongan, Batang, Semarang, Demak, Kudus, Pati, Rembang, Tuban, Lamongan, Surabaya, Sidoarjo, Pasuruan, Probolinggo, Bondowoso, and Panarukan.

== Media depiction ==
In 1996, Dutch director Bernie IJdis made the film De Groote Postweg ("The Great Post Road"). A central character in the movie is the Indonesian writer Pramoedya Ananta Toer, who narrates it. The film has aspects of a road movie, interspersed with shots at Toer's house. It discusses the sacrifices made by the native population during the road's construction and exposes the lack of freedom and the rampant corruption of modern-day Indonesia. A censor from the Indonesian government accompanied the crew, and IJdis said afterwards he never expected to be let into Indonesia again.

== See also ==
- North Coast Road (Java)
