= Pontang =

- District
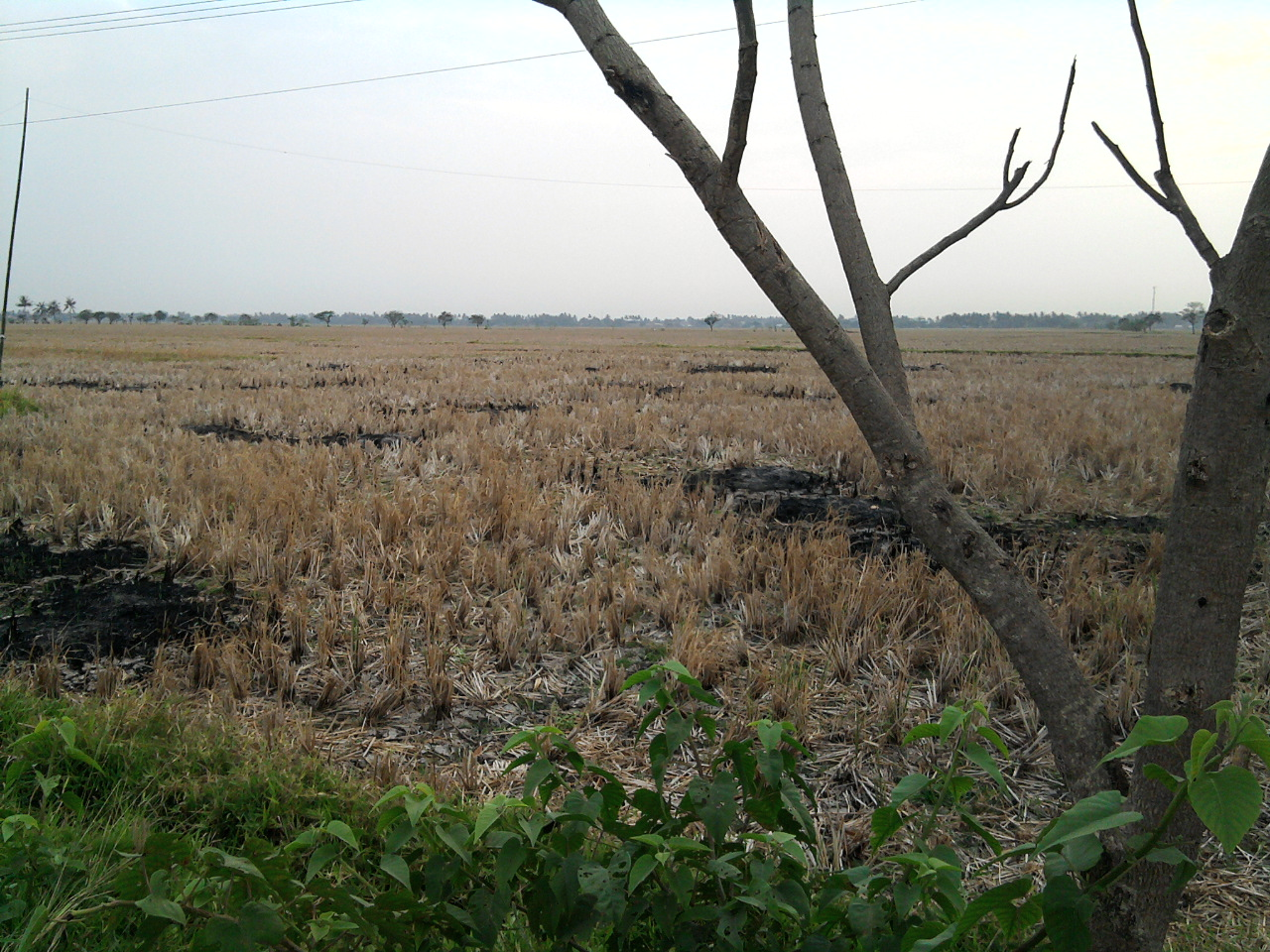
- Country near Madrasah Alkhairiyah Panecekan

- Location in Java
- Coordinates: 6.048754°S 106.269543°E
- Country: Indonesia
- Province: Banten
- Regency: Serang

Population (2010)
  - Total: 48,582

Pontang is a district in the Banten province on the island of Java, Indonesia.

== Location ==
The Ciujung, a river, enters the sea at Pontang. The Ciujung discharges into the 120 square kilometres (46 sq mi) Banten Bay.

== Historical ==
Pontang port and the Ciujung river used to be important for carrying merchandise into the interior. Tomé Pires, who wrote of the region around 1515, said Pontang was one of the busy and crowded ports of the Sunda kingdom. The harbor was smaller than that of Banten, but the only one where large ships could anchor. The city was beautiful, with the harbor at the river bank near the sea shore. Rice, pepper and food were sold. To guard against Muslim influence the king banned trade with Muslim merchants from Java.

By the end of the 17th century the "sultan's canals" had been built for the purpose of irrigation between Markasana and Kanari, and between Pontang, Tanara and Bensung. Presumably some rice fields were irrigated in the mid-18th century. However, until the 20th century sawah that depended on rain covered 2.5 times more land than irrigated sawah in the coastal region.

In 1813 Java was under British control and the land was being leased rather than subject to forced deliveries and contingents as it had been under the Dutch. Major Udney Yule, the British resident, was instructed by Stamford Raffles to grant equitable and moderate leases to the renter class. All the half-yearly rents in the Bantam Residency due on 1 July 1813 were paid on time apart from those due from Pontang, Tanara, Tambakbaya and Trate(?). In this area a drought had caused the rice crop to fail entirely.

== Villages ==
As of 2010 the district was divided into the following villages:

Village	2010 pop.
Sukajaya	3,803
Sukanegara	2,182
Lebak Kepuh	2,022
Lebakwangi	2,368
Kencana Harapan	2,795
Pegandikan	2,807
Kalapian	2,965
Keserangan	3,677
Pulo Kencana	3,559
Linduk	4,462
Kubang Puji	4,428
Singarajan	3,753
Pontang	3,482
Wanayasa	2,079
Domas	4,200

== Sources ==
- Atsushi Ota (July 2003), "Banten Rebellion, 1750–1752: Factors behind the Mass Participation", Modern Asian Studies, 37 (3), Cambridge University Press, doi:10.1017/s0026749x03003044, JSTOR 3876612
- Bastin, John (1960), "The Working of the Early Land Rent System in West Java", Bijdragen tot de Taal-, Land- en Volkenkunde, 116 (3), Deel: Brill, JSTOR 27860245
- Green, Edmund Peter (2003), World Atlas of Seagrasses, University of California Press, ISBN 978-0-520-24047-6
- Population of Indonesia by Village: Result of 2010 Population Census (PDF), Central Bureau of Statistics (BPS – Statistics Indonesia), archived from the original (PDF) on 2015-02-07
- Talens, Johan (1 January 1999), Een feodale samenleving in koloniaal vaarwater: staatsvorming, koloniale expansie en economische onderontwikkeling in Banten, West Java (1600–1750) (in Dutch), Uitgeverij Verloren, ISBN 90-6550-067-7
- Titi Surti Nastiti (2006), "Old Sundanese Community", Archaeology: Indonesian Perspective : R.P. Soejono's Festschrift, Yayasan Obor Indonesia, ISBN 978-979-26-2499-1
