= Great Post Road (film) =

1996 film

Great Post Road (De Groote Postweg) is a 1996 Dutch film about the Great Post Road constructed in Java when it was part of the Dutch East Indies. The film is narrated by Indonesian author Pramoedya Ananta Toer.
