= Paras, East Java =

Coordinates: 07°39′17″S 113°58′40″E

Paras is a populated place in Panarukan, a district of Situbondo Regency, East Java on the island of Java, Indonesia.
