= Panarukan =

Coordinates: 7°42′0″S 113°56′0″E

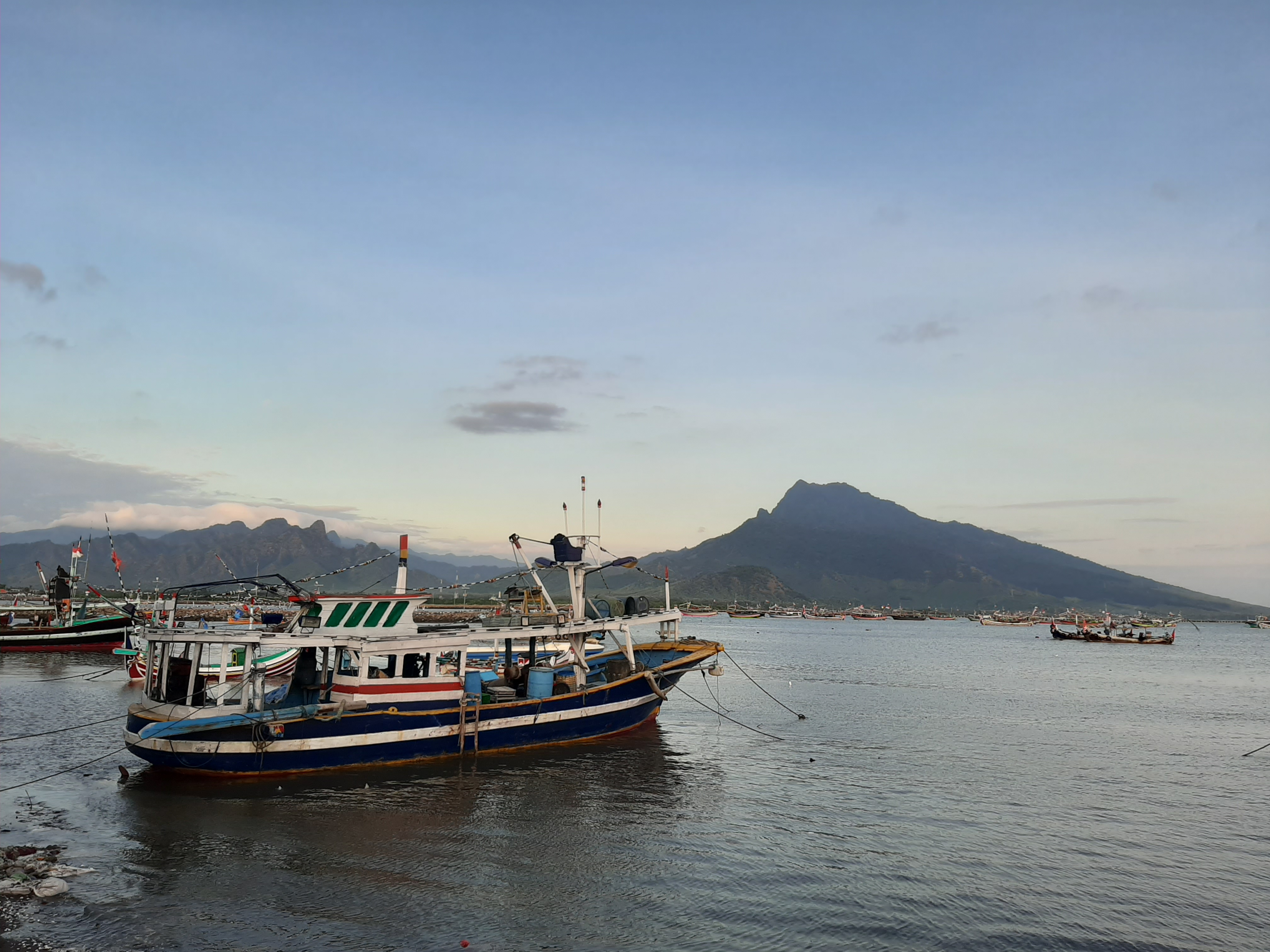
- Harbour view from Panarukan
- Interactive map of Panarukan
- Country: Indonesia
- Province: East Java
- Regency: Situbondo Regency

Population (mid 2025 estimate)
  - Total: 60,032

Panarukan is an administrative district (kecamatan) in Situbondo Regency, East Java Province of Indonesia. This district is about 8 km from the regency's administrative centre of Situbondo to the west. It covers an area of 60.05 km^{2} and had a population of 60,032 as at mid 2025. The centre of government is in the village of Wringin Anom.

== Villages ==
- Alas Malang
- Duwet
- Gelung
- Kilensari
- Paowan
- Paras
- Peleyan
- Sumber Kolak
- Wringin Anom

== See also ==
- List of districts of East Java
