= Tanara =

- District
- Location in Java
- Coordinates: 6.033760°S 106.381831°E
- Country: Indonesia
- Province: Banten
- Regency: Serang

Tanara is a district in the Banten province on the island of Java, Indonesia.

The Ci Durian, a river, enters the Java Sea at Tanara. As of 2010 the district was divided into the following villages:

Village	2010 pop.
Siremen	4,081
Cibodas	3,852
Cerukcuk	4,237
Lempuyang	5,926
Bendung	5,083
Sukamanah	2,675
Tanara	2,473
Pedaleman	4,638
Tenjo Ayu	3,932

== Sources ==
- Population of Indonesia by Village: Result of 2010 Population Census (PDF), Central Bureau of Statistics (BPS - Statistics Indonesia), archived from the original (PDF) on 2015-02-07
- Talens, Johan (1 January 1999), Een feodale samenleving in koloniaal vaarwater: staatsvorming, koloniale expansie en economische onderontwikkeling in Banten, West Java (1600–1750) (in Dutch), Uitgeverij Verloren, ISBN 90-6550-067-7
