= Banten =

Province in Java, Indonesia

- Province
- Province of Banten; Provinsi Banten
- Coat of arms
- Nickname: Tatar Wahanten (Sundanese) ᮒᮒᮁ ᮝᮠᮔ᮪ᮒᮨᮔ᮪ "Land of Banten"
- Motto: Iman Taqwa "Faith and Piety"
- Banten in Indonesia
- Interactive map of Banten
- Coordinates: 6°30′S 106°15′E
- Country: Indonesia
- Region: Java (Western Indonesia)
- Established: 4 October 2000
- Capital: Serang
- Largest city: Tangerang

Government
  - Body: Banten Provincial Government
  - Governor: Andra Soni (Gerindra)
  - Vice Governor: Achmad Dimyati Natakusumah
  - Legislature: Banten Regional House of Representatives (DPRD)

Area
  - Total: 9,355.76 km^{2} (3,612.28 sq mi)
  - Rank: 34th in Indonesia
- Highest elevation (Mount Halimun): 1,929 m (6,329 ft)

Population (mid 2025 estimate)
  - Total: 12,431,390
  - Density: 1,328.74/km^{2} (3,441.43/sq mi)
- Demonym: Bantenese

Demographics
  - Ethnic groups (2010): 63,43% Sundanese; 16,03% Javanese; 12,88% Betawi; 7.66% others
  - Religion (2014): 94.62% Islam: 3.94% Christianity; 2.65% Protestantism; 1.29%Catholicism; 1.30% Buddhism; 0.10%Hinduism; 0.04% other (including Confucianism, Sunda Wiwitan, etc.)
  - Languages and dialects: Indonesian (official); Sundanese, Baduy (native); Javanese; Betawi; Benteng; Lampung
- Time zone: UTC+7 (Indonesia Western Time)
- ISO 3166 code: ID-BT
- GDP (nominal): 2022
- Total: Rp 747.3 trillion (8th); US$ 50.3 billion Int$ 157.0 billion (PPP)
- Per capita: Rp 61.00 million (15th); US$ 4,107; Int$ 12,817 (PPP)
- Growth: ▲5.03%
- HDI (2024): ▲0.764 (7th) – high
- Website: bantenprov.go.id

Banten (Sundanese: ᮘᮔ᮪ᮒᮨᮔ᮪, romanized: Wahanten) is the westernmost province on the island of Java, Indonesia. The capital city of the province is Serang and its largest city is Tangerang. The province borders West Java and the Special Capital Region of Jakarta on the east, the Java Sea on the north, the Indian Ocean on the south, and the Sunda Strait (which separates Java from the neighbouring island of Sumatra) on the west and shares a maritime border with Lampung to the west. The province covers an area of 9,355.76 km^{2} (3,612.28 sq mi). It had a population of over 11.9 million in the 2020 census, up from about 10.6 million in 2010. The estimated mid-2025 population was 12,537,440 (comprising 6,369,700 males and 6,167,740 females), still increasing by over 100,000 people per year. Formerly part of the province of West Java, Banten was split off to become a separate province on 17 October 2000.

The northern half (particularly the eastern areas near Jakarta and the Java Sea coast) has recently experienced rapid rises in population and urbanization, and the southern half (especially the region facing the Indian Ocean) has a more traditional character but an equally fast-rising population.

Present-day Banten was part of the Sundanese Tarumanagara kingdom from the fourth to the seventh centuries AD. After the fall of Tarumanegara, it was controlled by Hindu-Buddhist kingdoms such as the Srivijaya Empire and the Sunda Kingdom. The spread of Islam in the region began in the 15th century; by the late 16th century, Islam had replaced Hinduism and Buddhism as the dominant religion in the province, with the establishment of the Banten Sultanate. European traders began arriving in the region – first the Portuguese, followed by the British and the Dutch. The Dutch East India Company, VOC (Vereenigde Oost-Indische Compagnie), finally controlled the regional economy, gradually weakening the Banten Sultanate. On 22 November 1808, Dutch Governor-General Herman Willem Daendels declared that the Sultanate of Banten had been absorbed into the Dutch East Indies. This began the Bantam Residency, 150 years of direct Dutch rule. In March 1942, the Japanese invaded the Indies and occupied the region for three years before their August 1945 surrender. The region was returned to Dutch control for the next five years before the Dutch left and it was ruled by the Indonesian government. Banten became part of the province of West Java, but separatist efforts led to the creation of the separate province of Banten in October 17, 2000.

== Etymology ==
The name "Banten" has several possible origins. The first is from the Sundanese phrase katiban inten, which means "struck down by diamonds". The phrase comes from the history of the Bantenese people, who were animists before adopting Buddhism and Hinduism. After Islam began to spread in Banten, the community began to recognize and embrace Islam. The spread of Islam in Banten is described as being "struck down by diamonds".

Another origin story is that the Indonesian Hindu god Batara Guru traveled from east to west, arriving at Surasowan (present-day Serang). When he arrived, Batara Guru sat on a stone which became known as watu gilang. The stone glowed, and was presented to the king of Surasowan. Surasowan was reportedly surrounded by a clear, star-like river, and was described as a ring covered with diamonds (Sundanese: ban inten). This evolved into "banten".

Another possibility is that "Banten" comes from the Indonesian word bantahan (rebuttal), because the local Bantenese people resisted the Dutch colonial government. The word "Banten" appeared before the establishment of the Banten Sultanate as the name of a river. The high plains on its banks were called Cibanten Girang, shortened to Banten Girang (Upper Banten). Based on research in Banten Girang, the area has been settled since the 11th and 12th centuries. During the 16th century, the region developed rapidly towards Serang and the northern coast. The coastal area later became the Sultanate of Banten, founded by Sunan Gunung Jati, which controlled almost all of the former Sunda Kingdom in West Java. Sunda Kelapa (Batavia) was captured by the Dutch, and Cirebon and the Parahiyangan region were captured by the Mataram Sultanate. The Banten Sultanate was later converted into a residency by the Dutch.

== History ==
=== Early history ===
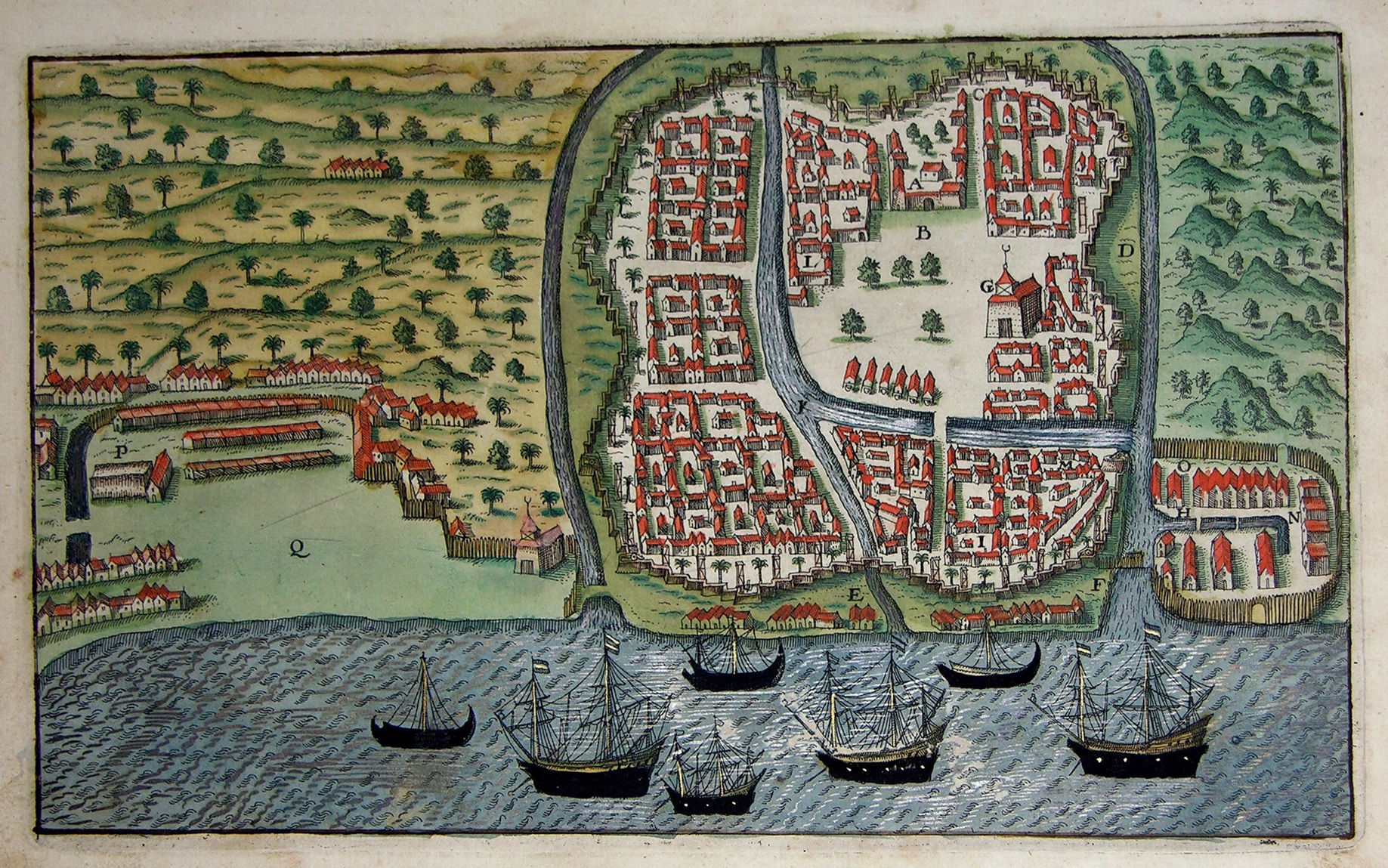
Bird's-eye view of the town of Banten in 1599

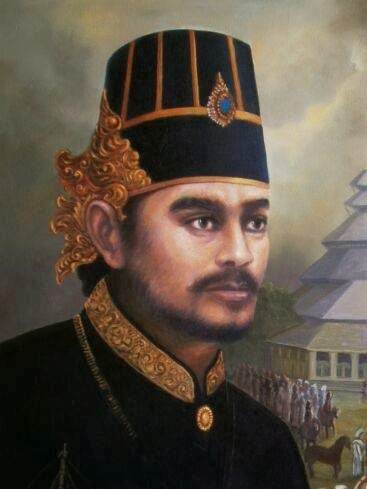
With his father, Sunan Gunungjati, Sultan Maulana Hasanuddin founded the Sultanate of Banten.

During the fifth century, Banten was part of the kingdom of Tarumanagara. The fourth-century Lebak inscription, discovered in 1947 in a lowland village on the Cidanghiyang River in Munjul, Pandeglang, contains two lines of Sanskrit poetry in the Pallawa script which describes life in the kingdom under the reign of Purnawarman. The kingdom collapsed after an attack by Srivijaya, and western Java became part of the Sunda Kingdom. In the Chinese Chu-fan-chi, written around 1225, Chou Ju-kua wrote that Srivijaya ruled Sumatra, the Malay peninsula, and western Java during the early 13th century. Chu-fan-chi identified the port of Sunda as strategic and thriving, with pepper from Sunda among the highest quality. The population were made up of farmers, and their houses were built on wooden poles (rumah panggung). Robbery, however, was common.

According to Portuguese explorer Tome Pires, Bantam (Banten) was an important early-16th-century port in the Kingdom of Sunda along with the ports of Pontang, Cheguide (Cigede), Tangaram (Tangerang), Calapa (Sunda Kelapa) and Chimanuk (on the Cimanuk river estuary). In 1527, as the Portuguese fleet arrived off the coast, newly-converted Javanese Muslims under Sunan Gunungjati captured the port of Banten and the surrounding area from the Sundanese and established the Sultanate of Banten. According to Portuguese historian João de Barros, Banten was the center of the sultanate and a major Southeast Asian port (rivaling Malacca and Makassar). The town of Banten was in the middle of the bay, about 3 mi (4.8 km) across. It was 850 fathoms in length. A river, navigable by junks, flowed through the center of the town; a small tributary extended to the town's edge. The present-day river is smaller, and only navigable by small boats. A fortress near the town had brick walls seven palms thick. Armed, wooden defence buildings were two stories high. The town square was used for military activities and folk art, with a market in the morning. The palace was on the south side of the square. Next to the palace is a tall, flat-roofed building known as Srimanganti, which was used by the king to meet his subjects. West of the square is the Great Mosque of Banten.

=== Colonial era ===
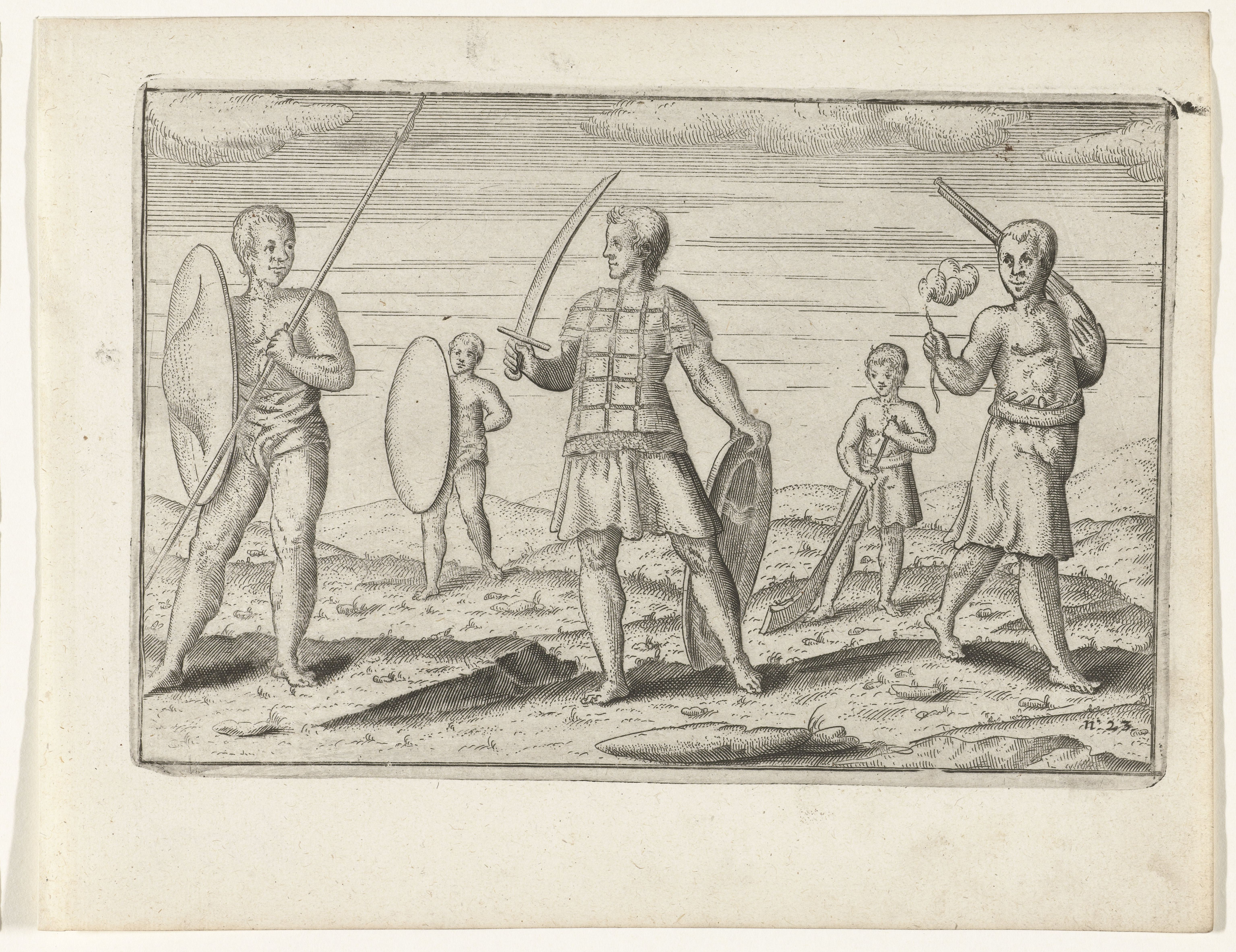
Warriors of Banten in 1596

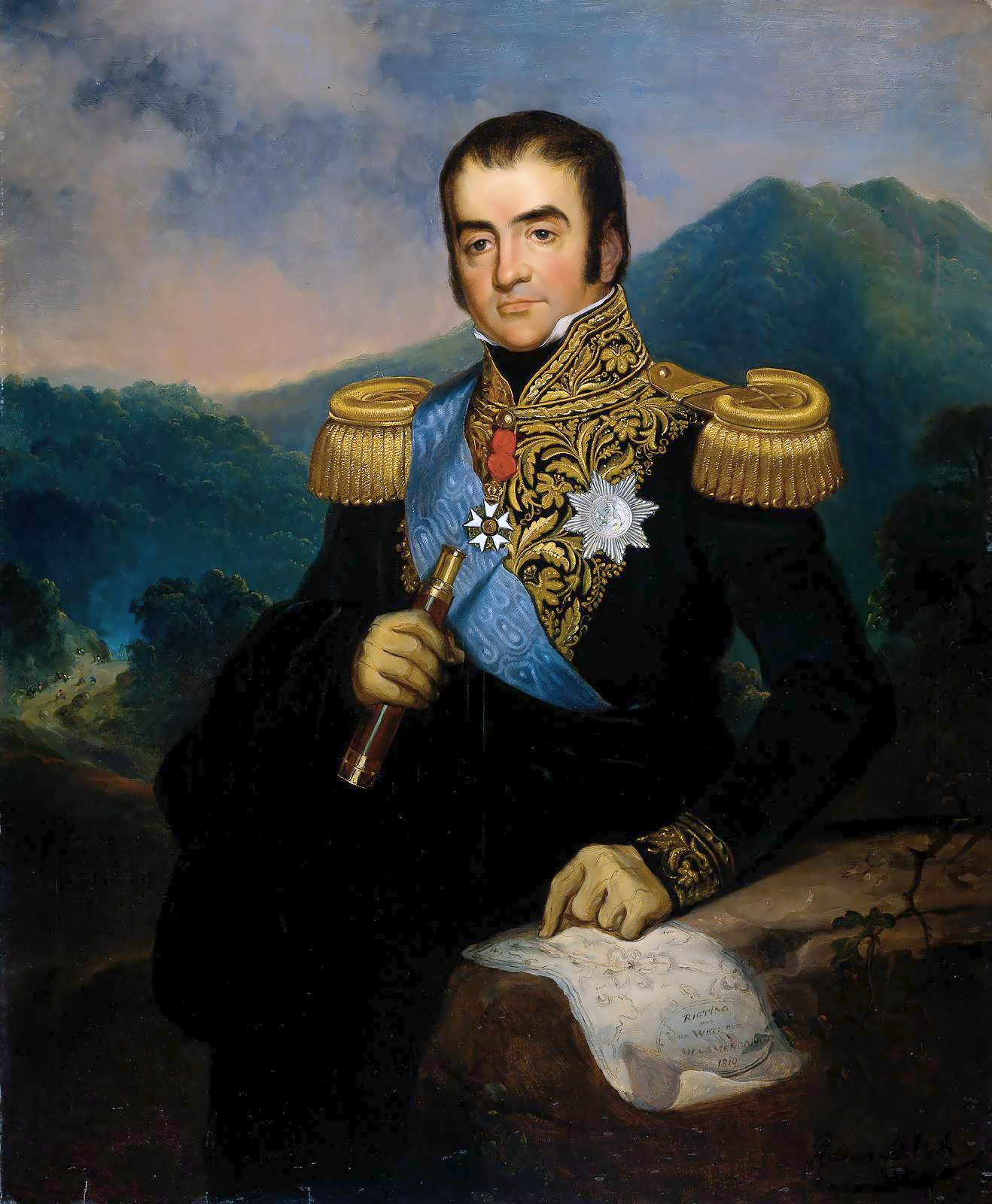
In 1808, Dutch Governor-general Herman Willem Daendels ordered the annexation of the Banten Sultanate. This marked the end of the four-century-old sultanate and the beginning of 150 years of Dutch rule in the region.

When the Dutch arrived in Indonesia, the Portuguese had long been in Banten. The English established a factory in Banten, followed by the Dutch. The French and the Danish also came to trade in Banten. In the competition among European traders, the Dutch emerged victorious. The Portuguese left Banten in 1601 after their fleet was destroyed by the Dutch off the coast during the Dutch–Portuguese War.

In 16th century, Chinese junk ships regularly traded with Jambi, Patani, Siam and Cambodia. Local Muslim women who dealt in the cloth trade willingly married Han Chinese men in Palembang and Jambi and also local Muslim women in Banten married Han Chinese men. The Han Chinese men usually converted to Islam to please their Muslim wives.

Although the Dutch won the war, they preserved the Banten Sultanate. The maritime sultanate relied on trade, and the pepper monopoly in Lampung made the Banten authorities intermediaries. The sultanate grew rapidly, becoming a commercial center. As sea trade increased throughout the archipelago, Banten became a multi-ethnic region. Assisted by the British, Danish and Chinese, Banten traded with Persia, India, Siam, Vietnam, the Philippines, China and Japan. The reign of Sultan Ageng Tirtayasa was the sultanate's height. Under his reign, Banten had one of the strongest navies in the region, built to European standards with help from European shipbuilders and attracted Europeans to the sultanate. To secure its shipping lanes, Banten sent its fleet to Sukadana (the present-day Ketapang Regency in West Kalimantan) and conquered it in 1661. Banten also tried to escape the pressure of the Dutch East India Company (VOC), which had blockaded incoming merchant ships.

A power struggle developed around 1680 between Ageng Tirtayasa and his son, Abu Nashar Abdul Qahar (also known as Sultan Haji). The disagreement was exploited by the VOC, who supported Haji and causing a civil war. Strengthening his position, Haji sent two envoys to meet King Charles II of England in London in 1682 to obtain support and weapons. In the ensuing war, Ageng withdrew from his palace to Tirtayasa (present-day Tangerang); on 28 December 1682, the region was seized by Haji with Dutch assistance. Ageng and his other sons, Pangeran Purbaya and Syekh Yusuf from Makassar, retreated to the southern Sunda interior. On 14 March 1683, Sultan Ageng was captured and imprisoned in Batavia.

The VOC continued to pursue and suppress Sultan Ageng's followers, led by Prince Purbaya and Sheikh Yusuf. On 5 May 1683, the VOC sent Lieutenant Untung Surapati and his Balinese troops, joining forces led by VOC Lieutenant Johannes Maurits van Happel to subdue the Pamotan and Dayeuhluhur regions; on 14 December 1683, they captured Sheikh Yusuf. Heavily outnumbered, Prince Purbaya surrendered. Surapati was ordered by Captain Johan Ruisj to pick up Purbaya and bring him to Batavia. They met with VOC forces led by Willem Kuffeler, but a dispute between them destroyed Kuffeler's forces; Surapati and his followers became fugitives from the VOC.

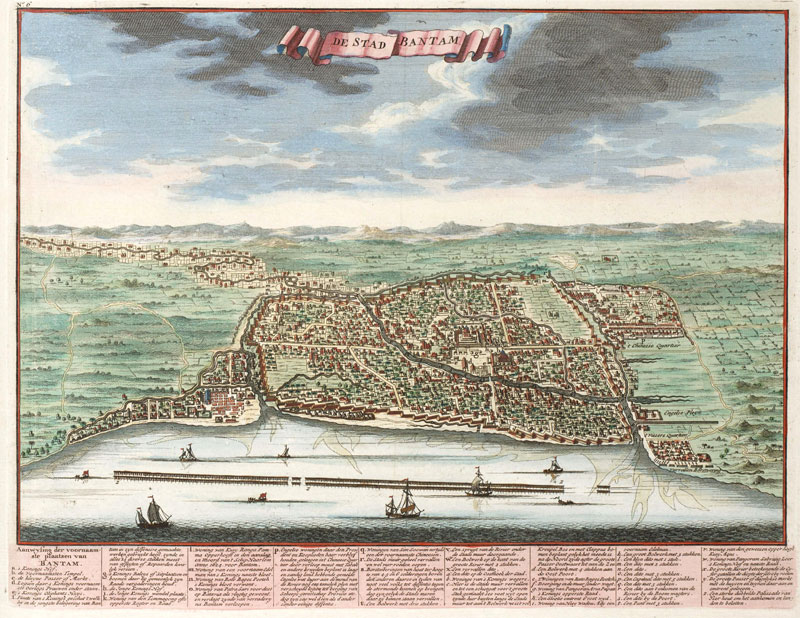
François Valentijn's painting of Banten in 1694

Lampung was given to the VOC on 12 March 1682 by Sultan Haji as compensation for the company's support, and a 22 August 1682 letter gave the VOC the province's pepper monopoly. The sultanate also had to reimburse the VOC for losses caused by the war. After Sultan Haji's death in 1687, the VOC's influence in the sultanate began to increase; the appointment of a new sultan required the approval of the governor-general in Batavia. Sultan Abu Fadhl Muhammad Yahya ruled for about three years before he was replaced by his brother, Pangeran Adipati (Sultan Abul Mahasin Muhammad Zainul Abidin). The civil war in Banten left instability for the next government, due to dissatisfaction with the VOC's interference in local affairs. Popular resistance peaked again at the end of the reign of Sultan Abul Fathi Muhammad Syifa Zainul Arifin. The sultan sought VOC assistance against the rebellion, and Banten became a vassal state of the company in 1752.

In 1808, at the peak of the Napoleonic Wars, Governor-general Herman Willem Daendels ordered the construction of the Great Post Road to defend Java from British attack. Daendels ordered the sultan of Banten to move his capital to Anyer and provide labor to build a port in Ujung Kulon. The sultan defied Daendels' order, and Daendels ordered an attack on Banten and the destruction of Surosowan Palace. The sultan and his family were held in the palace before their imprisonment in Fort Speelwijk. Sultan Abul Nashar Muhammad Ishaq Zainulmutaqin was then exiled to Batavia. On 22 November 1808, Daendels announced from his Serang headquarters that the sultanate had been absorbed into the Dutch East Indies. The sultanate was abolished in 1813 by the British after the invasion of Java. That year, Sultan Muhammad bin Muhammad Muhyiddin Zainussalihin was disarmed and forced to abdicate by Thomas Stamford Raffles; this ended the sultanate. After the British returned Java to the Dutch in 1814 as part of the Anglo-Dutch Treaty of 1814, Banten became a residentie (residency) of the Dutch East Indies. Banten was also at the center of the 1926 communist uprising in Java, where fighting persisted for several weeks after it had ended in other parts of Java.

=== Japanese occupation and independence ===
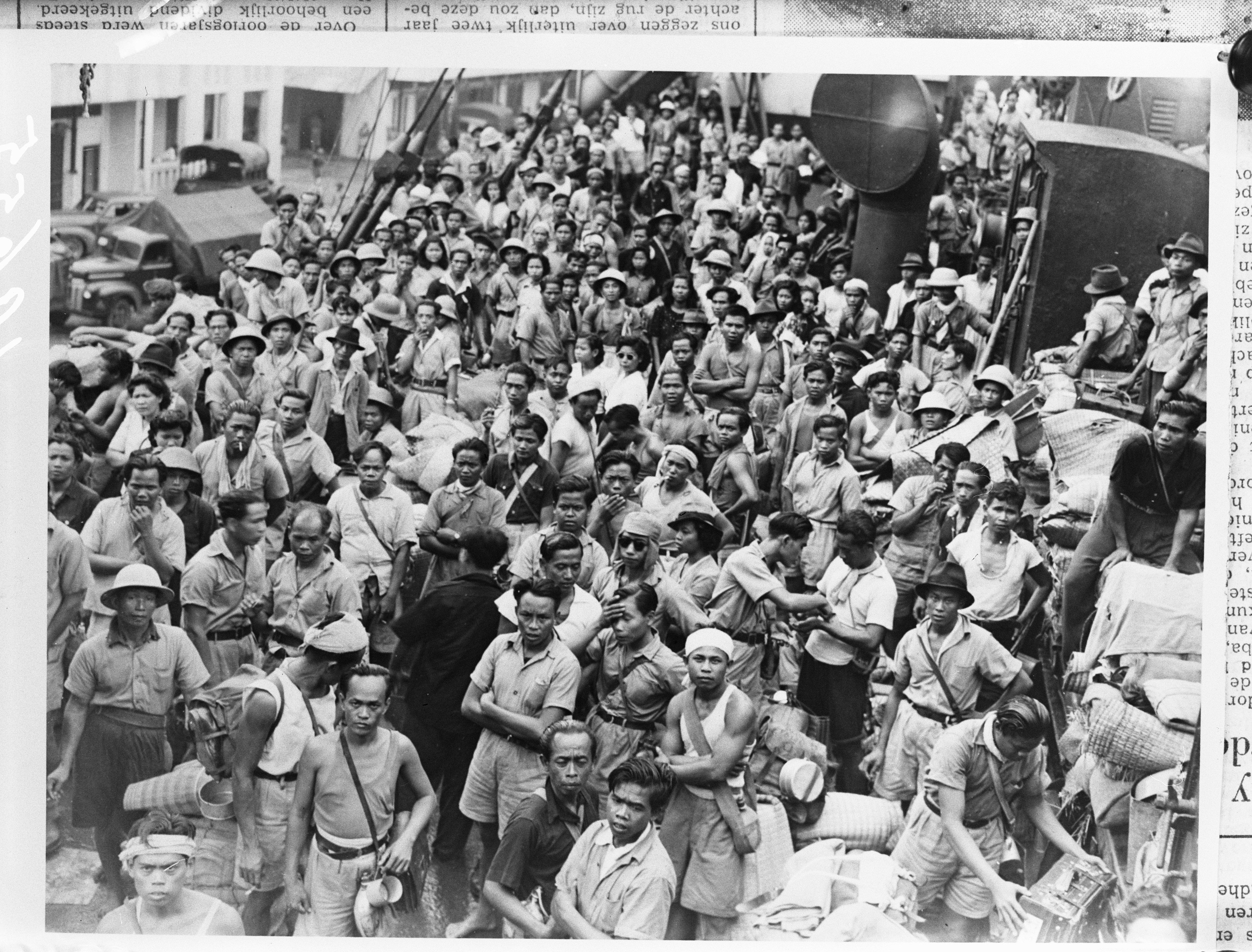
Rōmusha after their liberation by the Dutch. Thousands of labourers died during the construction of the Saketi–Bayah railway under Japanese occupation.

The Empire of Japan invaded the East Indies, expelling the Dutch, and occupied Banten in March 1942. During their three years of occupation, the Japanese built the Saketi–Bayah railway in southern Lebak to transport brown coal from the Bayah mines. The project involved a workforce of about 1,000 rōmusha (local forced labourers) and a few engineers and technicians (mainly Dutch), supervised by the Japanese. The rōmusha working in the mines were taken from Central and East Java, the railway rōmusha were primarily from Banten. The construction took 12 million human days over 14 months. Working conditions were harsh due to food shortages, lack of medical care, and the tropical climate. Casualties are estimated at 20,000 to 60,000, not including mine workers.

After Japan surrendered in August 1945, the Dutch East Indies declared independence as the Republic of Indonesia. This was opposed by the returning Dutch, resulting in the Indonesian war of independence. During the war, Banten remained under Indonesian control. Though relatively autonomous during the reign of the self-proclaimed Tangerang Republic. On 26 February 1948, the State of West Java (Indonesian: Negara Jawa Barat, Sundanese: Negara Jawa Kulon) was established; on 24 April 1948, it was renamed Pasundan. Pasundan became a federal state of the United States of Indonesia in 1949, and was incorporated into the Republic of Indonesia on 11 March 1950.

After Indonesian independence, Banten became part of the province of West Java. Separatist sentiment led to the creation of the province of Banten in October 17, 2000.

== Geography ==
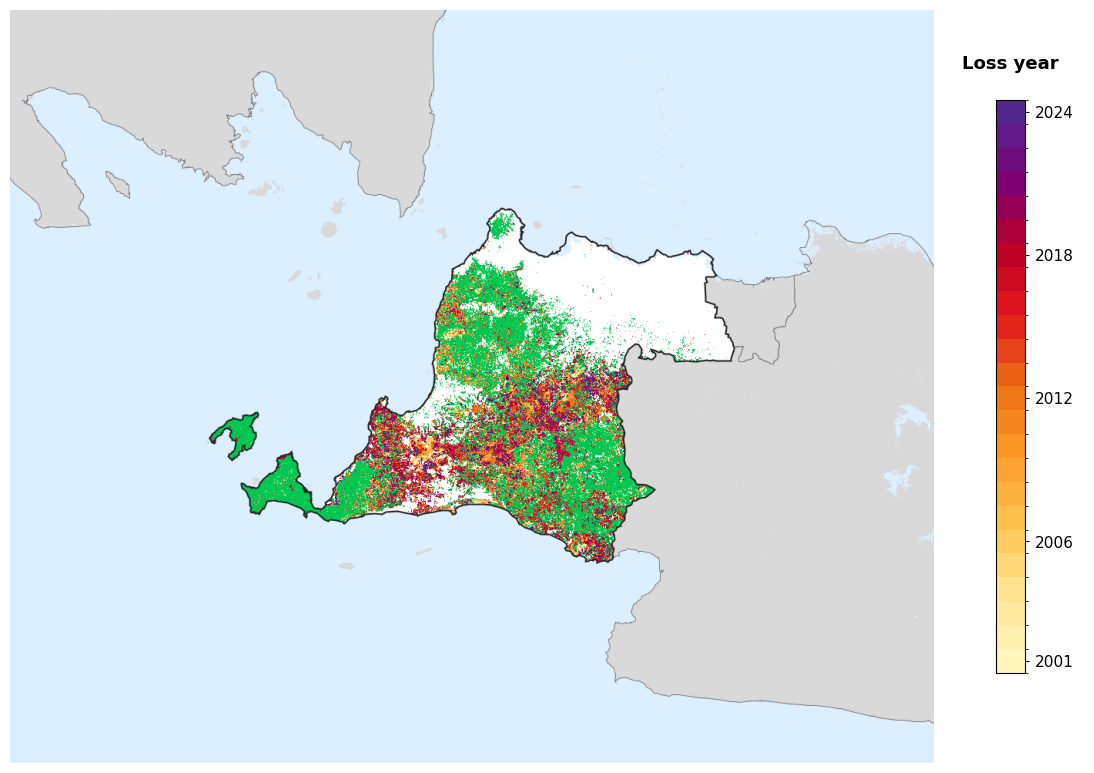
Tree-cover loss year in Banten, 2001-2024, from the Global Forest Change dataset.

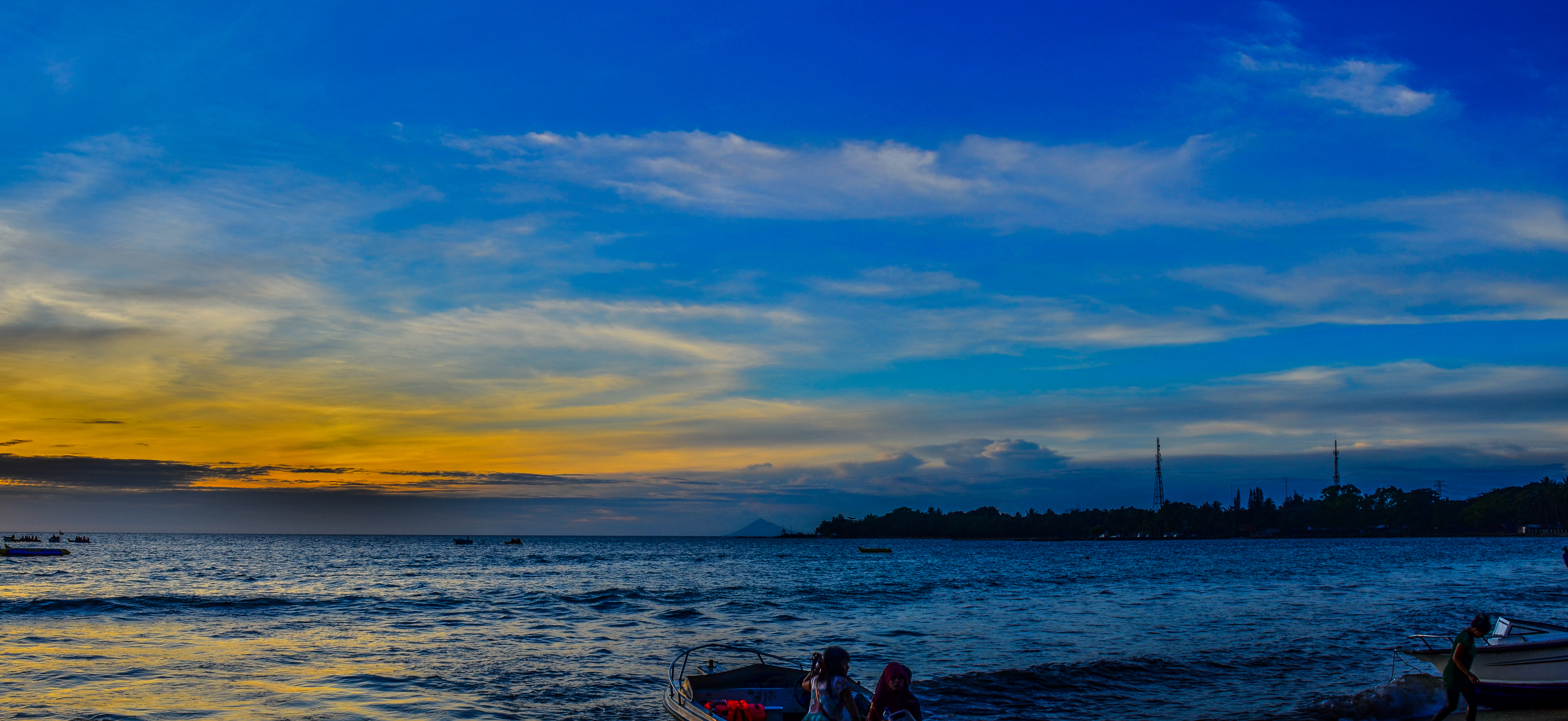
Tanjung Lesung beach, Pandegelang Regency

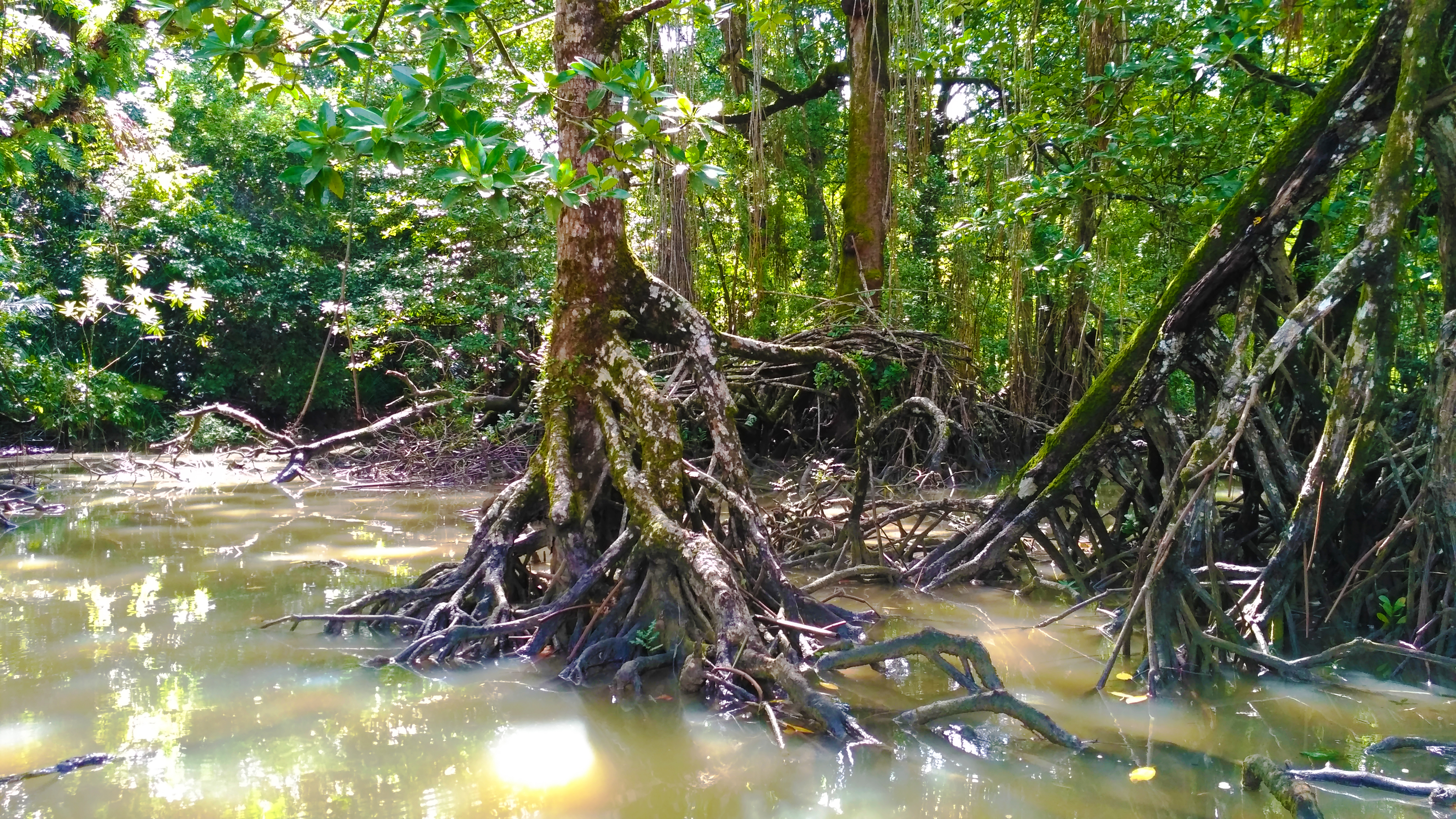
Mangrove forest in Ujung Kulon National Park

Banten lies between 5°7'50" and 7°1'11" south latitude and 105°1'11" and 106°7'12" east longitude. The province has a land area of 9,355.76 km^{2} (3,612.28 sq mi).

It is near the Sunda Strait's sea lanes, which link Australia and New Zealand with Southeast Asia. Banten also links Java and Sumatra. The region has a number of industries; its seaports handle overflow cargo from the seaport in Jakarta, and are intended to be an alternative to the Port of Singapore.

Its location on the western tip of Java makes Banten the gateway to Java, Sumatra and the adjacent areas of Jakarta, Indonesia's capital. Bordering the Java Sea on the north, the Sunda Strait on the west and the Indian Ocean on the south, the province has abundant marine resources.

The land area includes some 81 offshore islands (large enough to have names) of which 50 are in Pandeglang Regency, 4 in Lebak Regency, 9 in Serang Regency, 5 in Cilegon City and 11 in Tangerang Regency.

=== Topography ===
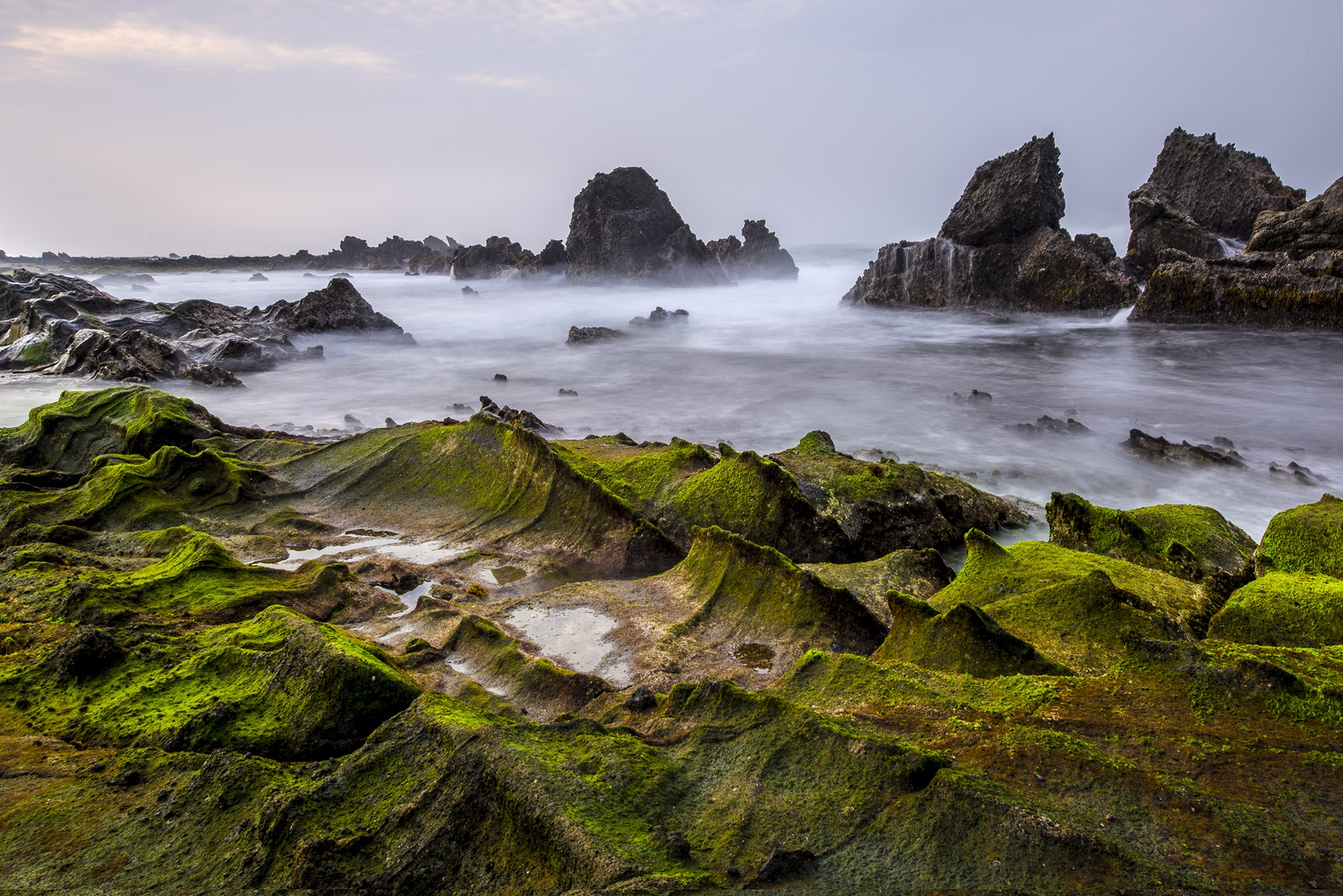
Sawarna Banten Green View, Lebak Regency

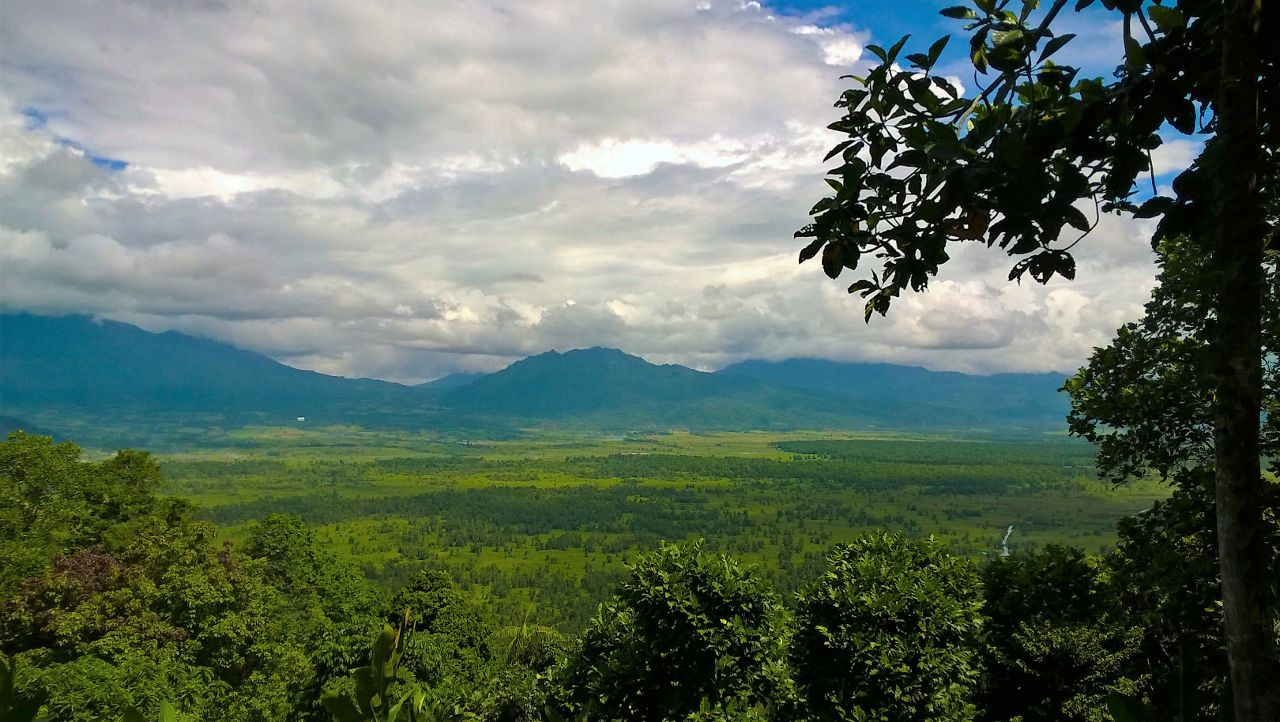
Rawa Danau, Serang Regency

The province ranges in altitude from sea level to 2,000 m (6,600 ft). Banten is primarily lowland (below 50 metres above sea level) in Cilegon, Tangerang, Pandeglang Regency, and most of Serang Regency. The central Lebak and Pandeglang Regencies range from 201 to 2,000 m (659 to 6,562 ft), and the eastern Lebak Regency ranges in altitude from 501 to 2,000 m (1,644 to 6,562 ft) at the summit of Mount Halimun.

Banten's geomorphology generally consists of lowlands and sloping and steep hills. The lowlands are generally in the north and south.

The sloping hills have a minimum height of 50 m (160 ft) above sea level. Mount Gede, north of Cilegon, has an altitude of 553 m (1,814 ft) above sea level; there are also hills in the southern Serang Regency, in the Mancak and Waringin Kurung Districts. The southern Pandeglang Regency is also hilly. In eastern Lebak Regency, bordering Bogor Regency and Sukabumi Regency in West Java, most of the region consists of steep hills of old sedimentary rock interspersed with igneous rocks such as granite, granodiorite, diorite and andesite. It also contains valuable tin and copper deposits.

=== Climate ===
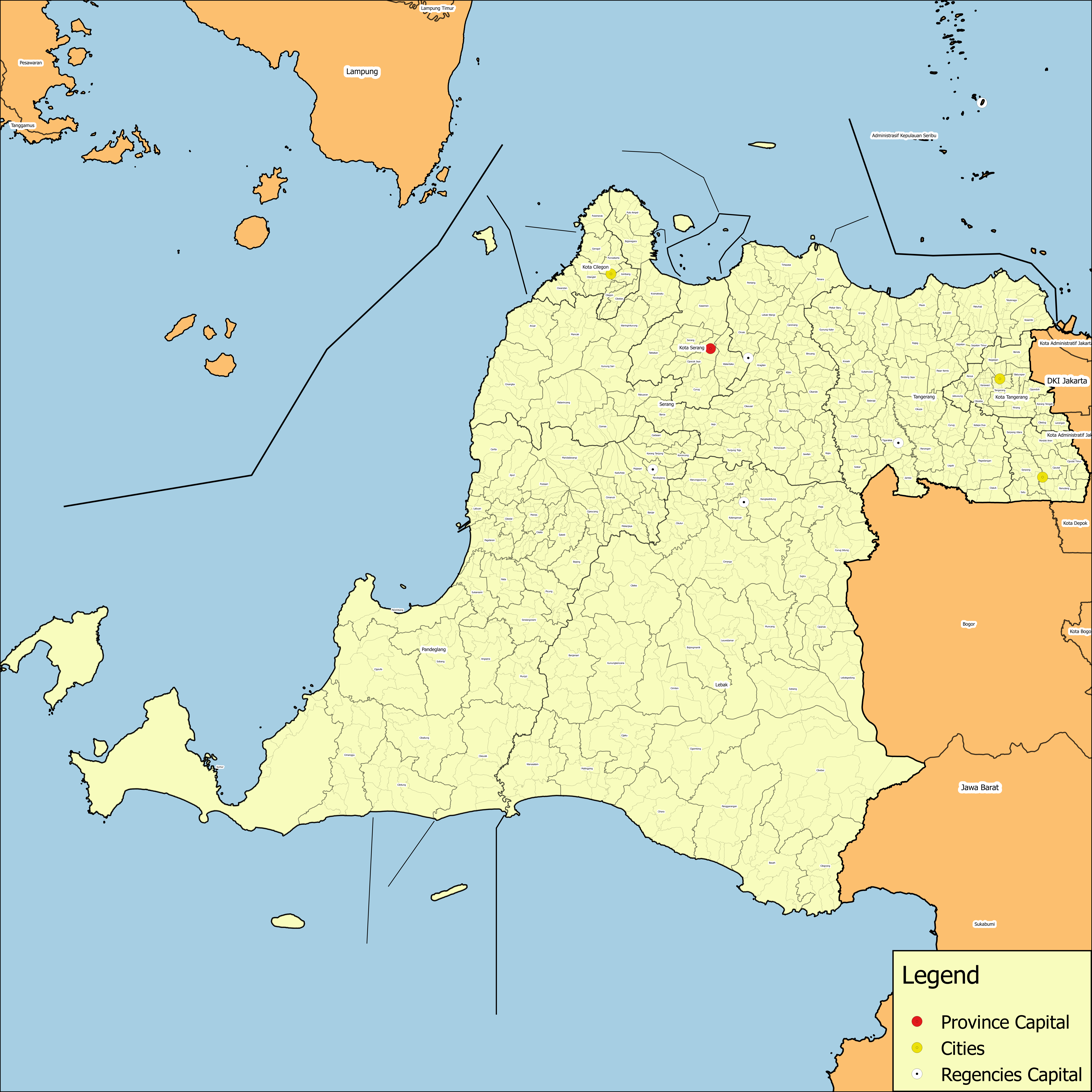
Administrative map of Banten

Banten's climate is influenced by the South and East Asian Monsoons and the alternating La Niña or El Niño. During the rainy season, the weather is dominated by a west wind (from Sumatra and the Indian Ocean south of the Indian subcontinent) joined by winds from Northern Asia crossing the South China Sea. The dry season is dominated by an east wind which gives Banten severe droughts, especially on the northern coast during El Niño. Temperatures on the coast and in the hills range from 22 to 32 °C (72 to 90 °F), and temperatures in the mountains from 400 to 1,350 m (1,310 to 4,430 ft) above sea level range from 18 to 29 °C (64 to 84 °F).

The heaviest rainfall ranges from 2,712 to 3,670 mm (106.8 to 144.5 in) during the rainy season from September to May, covering half of the western Pandeglang Regency. Rainfall from 335 to 453 mm (13.2 to 17.8 in) covers half of Tangerang Regency, the northern Serang Regency, and the cities of Cilegon and Tangerang. In the dry season (from April to December), the peak rainfall of 615 to 833 mm (24.2 to 32.8 in) covers half of the northern Serang and Tangerang Regencies and the cities of Cilegon and Tangerang. The lowest dry-season rainfall, 360 to 486 mm (14.2 to 19.1 in) from June to September, covers half of the southern Tangerang Regency and 15 percent of southeastern Serang Regency.

== Government and administrative divisions ==
The province is governed by Governor (Andra Soni of the Gerindra Party) and Vice Governor (Achmad Dimyati Natakusumah) and a Regional House of Representatives (DPRD) comprising 100 elected members (86 males and 14 females). In the east, Tangerang Regency is represented by 26 members, Tangerang City by 16 members and South Tangerang City by 11 members; in the west, Serang Regency is represented by 14 members, Lebak Regency by 12 members, Pandeglang Regency by 11 members, Serang City by 6 members and Cilegon City by 4 members. Elections were held on 14 February 2024 (concurrent with presidential and parliamentary elections), following which the three political parties with the most representatives were Golkar, PDI Perjuangan, and Gerindra with each represented by 14 members; other parties were PKS with 13 members, Demokrat with 11 members, NasDem and PKB with 10 members each, PAN with 7 members, PPP with 4 members and PSI with 3 members.

Banten consists of four regencies (kabupaten) and four autonomous cities (kota), listed below with their populations in the 2010 and 2020 censuses and the official estimates for mid-2025 as well as those projected for mid 2026. The cities and regencies are subdivided into 155 districts (kecamatan) as at 2024, in turn sub-divided into 314 urban villages (kelurahan) and 1,238 rural villages (desa).

Over half (54.2% in mid 2025) of the population lives in the northeast corner of the province on just 14.6% of its land area. This corner, which comprises Tangerang Regency, Tangerang City and South Tangerang City, is part of the Jakarta metropolitan area (Jabodetabek). While the provincial estimates for this region total 6,853,279 for mid 2025 as shown below, the individual regency and city estimates for mid 2025 published on the same date show a total of 6,967,005 (1,474,311 for South Tangerang city, 1,976,599 for Tangerang city, and 3,516,095 for Tangerang Regency).

Kode Wilayah	Name of City or regency	Capital	Area (km^{2})	Pop'n 2010 census	Pop'n 2020 census	Pop'n estimate mid-2025	Pop'n projected mid 2026	HDI 2014 estimate
36.72	Cilegon		162.58	374,559	434,896	460,400	465,000	0.715 (High)
36.73	Serang		266.31	577,785	692,101	745,560	756,150	0.702 (High)
36.02	Lebak Regency	Rangkasbitung	3,312.30	1,204,095	1,386,793	1,463,820	1,478,090	0.616 (Medium)
36.01	Pandeglang Regency	Pandeglang	2,771.49	1,149,610	1,272,687	1,338,370	1,350,500	0.620 (Medium)
36.04	Serang Regency	Ciruas	1,471.54	1,402,818	1,622,630	1,720,320	1,738,300	0.639 (Medium)
	Western Banten totals		7,984.22	4,708,867	5,409,107	5,728,470	5,788,040	
36.74	South Tangerang		164.86	1,290,322	1,354,350	1,402,160	1,405,040	0.791 (High)
36.71	Tangerang		178.35	1,798,601	1,895,486	1,971,650	1,979,290	0.758 (High)
36.03	Tangerang Regency	Tigaraksa	1,028.34	2,834,376	3,245,619	3,435,160	3,468,940	0.695 (Medium)
	Eastern Banten totals (Greater Tangerang)		1,371.55	5,923,299	6,495,455	6,808,970	6,853,270	
	Banten totals		9,355.76	10,632,166	11,904,562	12,537,440	12,641,300	0.698 (Medium)

The province comprises three of Indonesia's 84 national electoral districts to elect members to the People's Representative Council. The Banten I Electoral District consists of the regencies of Pandeglang and Lebak, and elects 6 members to the People's Representative Council. The Banten II Electoral District consists of the regency of Serang, together with the cities of Ciligon and Serang, and elects 6 members to the People's Representative Council. The Banten III Electoral District consists of the regency of Tangerang, together with the cities of Tangerang and South Tangerang, and elects 10 members to the People's Representative Council.

== Regency capitals ==
Under the Law No. 2 of 1993, Tangerang was incorporated as a city on 27 February 1993 from the Tangerang Regency, of which it had been the administrative capital. It was replaced by Cipasera.

Under the Law No. 15 of 1999, Cilegon was incorporated as a city on 20 April 1999 from the Serang Regency, of which it had been the administrative capital. It was replaced by Serang.

Under the Law No. 32 of 2007, Serang was incorporated as a city on 14 August 2007 from the Serang Regency, of which it had been the administrative capital. It was replaced by Ciruas.

Under the Law No. 51 of 2008, South Tangerang (formerly Cipasera) was incorporated as a city on 26 November 2008 from the Tangerang Regency, of which it had been the administrative capital. It was replaced by Tigaraksa.

== Demographics ==
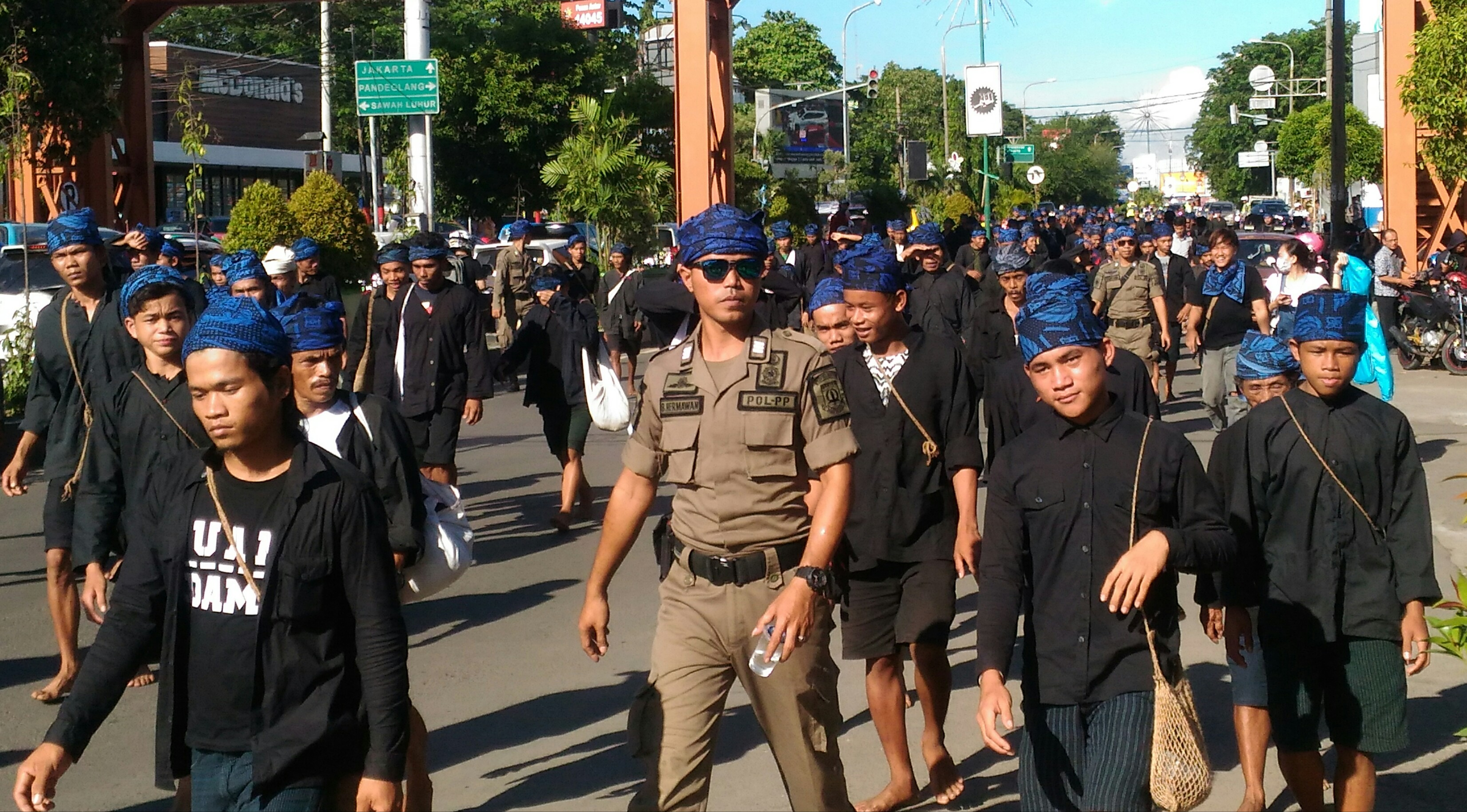
Baduy people in Serang during the Seba Baduy event

The 2006 population of Banten was 9,351,470, with 3,370,182 children (36.04 percent), 240,742 elderly people (2.57 percent), and the remaining 5,740,546 people aged between 15 and 64. It was Indonesia's fifth-most-populous province, after West Java, East Java, Central Java and North Sumatra. By mid-2022, the estimated total had risen to 12,251,985.

=== Ethnic groups ===
Ethnic groups in Banten
1. Sundanese (63.4%)
2. Javanese (16.0%)
3. Betawi (12.9%)
4. Others (7.66%)

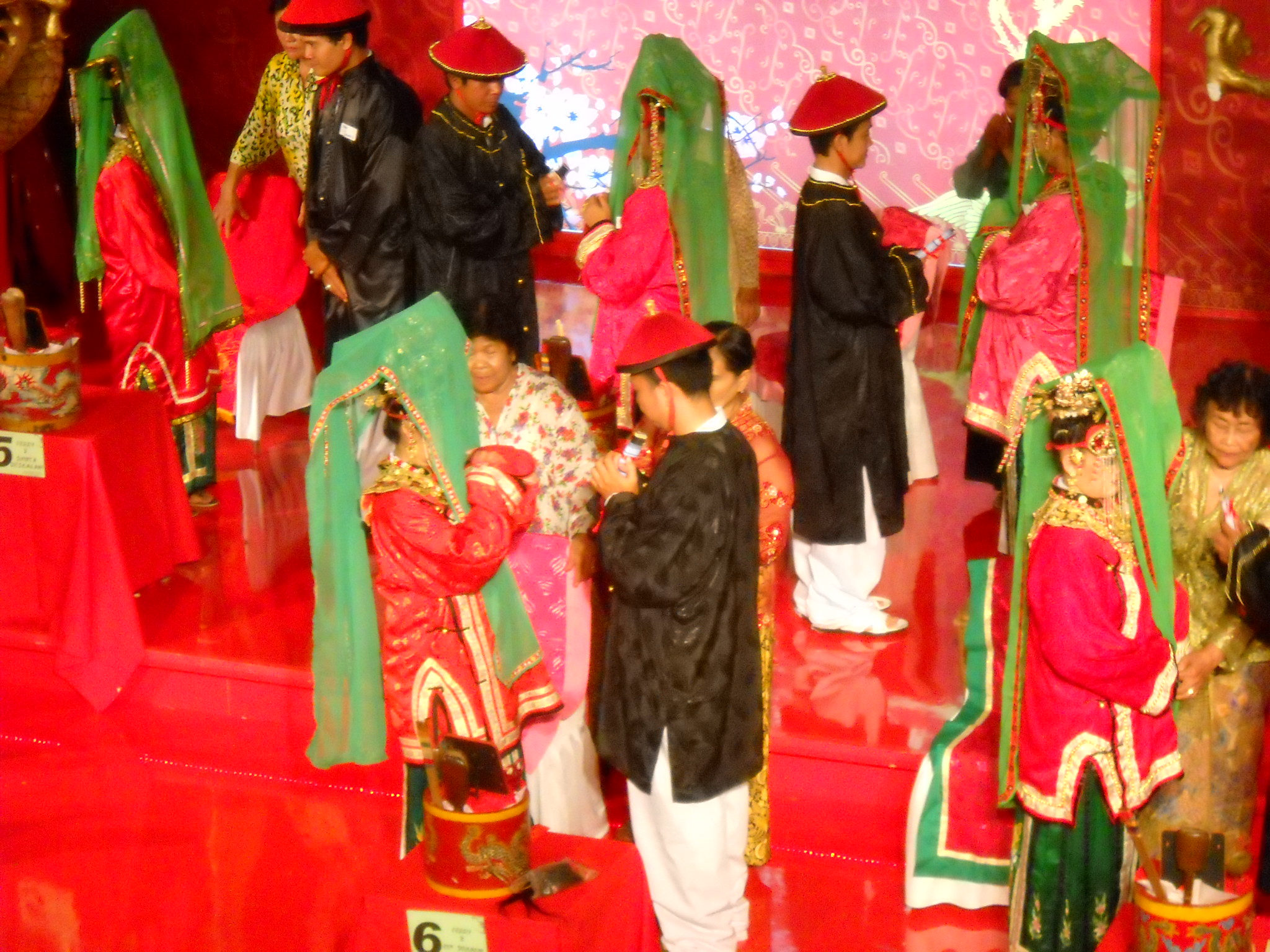
Mass Benteng wedding ceremony

The Bantenese people are the largest group in the province, forming 47% of the total population. They mostly inhabit the central and southern part of the province. The origins of the Bantenese people; which are closely related to the Banten Sultanate, are different from the Cirebonese people whom are not part of the Sundanese people nor the Javanese people (unless it is from the result of a mixture of two major cultures, namely Sundanese and Javanese). The Bantenese people along with the Baduy people (Kanekes) are essentially a subdivision of the Sundanese people which occupies the former region of the Banten Sultanate (region of Bantam Residency after the abolishment and annexation by the Dutch East Indies). Only after the formation of the Banten Province did people began to regard the Bantenese as a group of people with a culture and language of their own.

Most of the north Banten population is Javanese. Most of the Javanese are migrants from central and eastern Java. The Betawi people live in greater Jakarta, including Tangerang. Chinese Indonesians may also be found in urban areas, also primarily in the greater Jakarta area. The Benteng Chinese (a subgroup of Chinese Indonesians) lives in Tangerang and the surrounding area, and are distinct from other Chinese Indonesians.

=== Languages ===
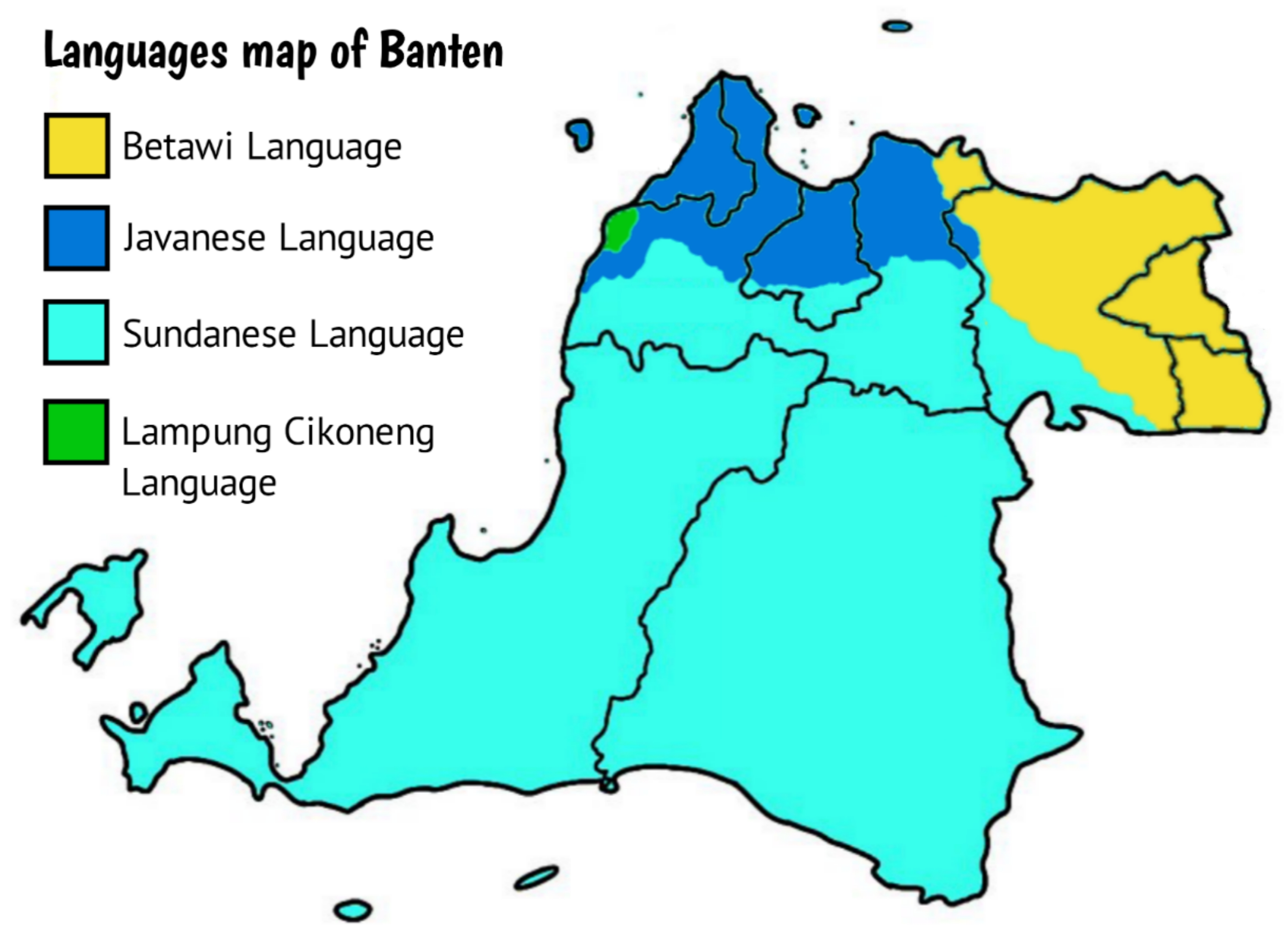
Linguistic map of Banten

The province's dominant language is Sundanese. Its indigenous people speak a dialect derived from archaic Sundanese, classified as informal in modern Sundanese.

The Mataram Sultanate tried to control West Java, including Banten; the Sultanate of Banten defended its territory except for Banten. In the mountains and most of present-day Banten, the "loma" version of the Sundanese language is dominant; this version is considered "harsh" by people from Parahyangan. Bantenese is commonly spoken, especially in the regencies of Pandeglang, Lebak, and Tangerang. Near Serang and Cilegon, the Serang Javanese is spoken by about 400,000–450,000 people. In northern Tangerang, Betawi and Benteng is spoken by Betawi and Benteng Chinese. Indonesian is also widely spoken, especially by urban migrants from other parts of Indonesia. The Baduy people speak the Baduy language, also an archaic form of Sundanese. In Anyar, a district in Serang Regency, the Lampung language is spoken by the residents of Cikoneng village, known as the Lampung Cikoneng language.

=== Religion ===
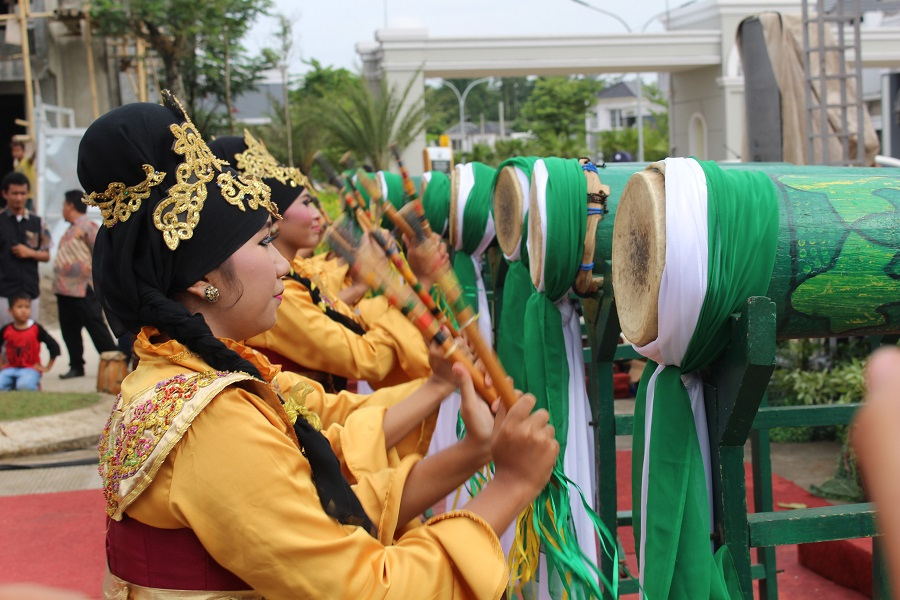
A rampak bedug performance at a Serang culinary festival

Most residents are Muslims (94.85% of population), and the Banten Sultanate was one of the largest Islamic kingdoms on the island of Java. The province also has other ethnicities and religions, including the Benteng Chinese community in Tangerang and the Baduy people who practice Sunda Wiwitan in Kanekes, Leuwidamar, Lebak Regency.

Based on archaeological data, early Banten society was influenced by the Hindu-Buddhist Tarumanagara, Sriwijaya and Sunda Kingdoms. According to the Babad Banten, Sunan Gunung Jati and Maulana Hasanuddin spread Islam extensively in the region. Maulana Yusuf reportedly engaged in da'wah in the interior, and conquered Pakuan Pajajaran.

The sultan of Banten's genealogy reportedly traced back to Muhammad, and the ulamas were influential. Tariqa Sufism developed in the region.

== Culture ==
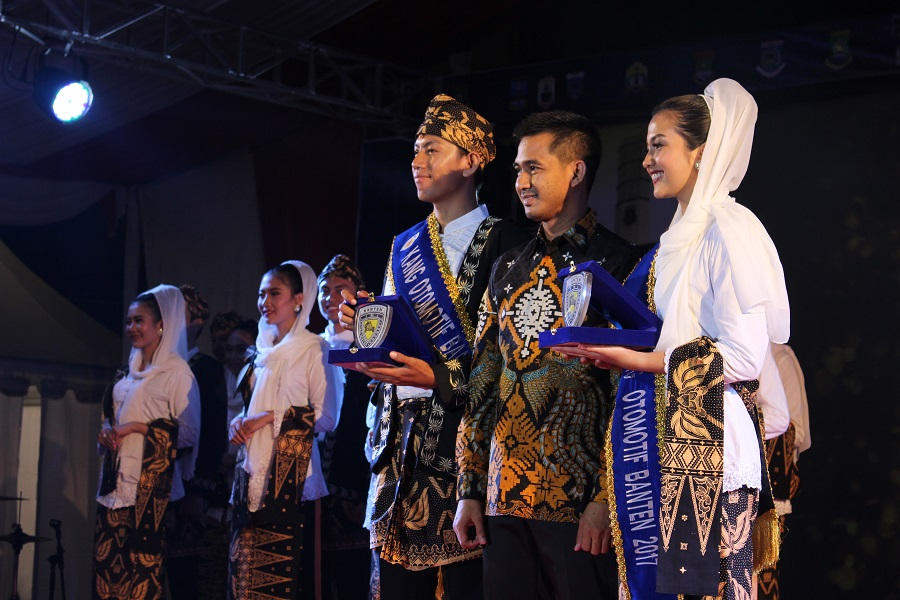
Selection of Kang Nong Banten in 2017. The finalists wear traditional Bantenese dress.

Banten's culture is based on Hinduism, Buddhism and Islam. It includes the pencak silat martial arts, the Saman dance, and Palingtung. Religious sites include the Great Mosque of Banten and the Keramat Panjang Tomb.

The Baduy people live in central and southern Banten. The Inner Baduy tribes are native Sundanese who are opposed to modernization in dress and lifestyle, and the Outer Baduy tribes are more open to modernization. The Baduy-Rawayan tribe lives in the Kendeng Cultural Heritage Mountains, an area of 5,101.85 ha (19.70 sq mi) spanning the Kanekes area, Leuwidamar District, Lebak Regency. Baduy villages are generally located on the Ciujung River in the Kendeng Mountains.

=== Weapons ===
The golok, similar to a machete, is Banten's traditional weapon. Formerly a self-defence weapon, it is now used as a martial-arts tool. The Baduy people use goloks for farming and forest hunting. Other traditional weapons include the kujang, kris, spear, sledgehammer, machete, sword and bow and arrow.

=== Traditional housing ===
Traditional housing in Banten has thatched roofing, with floors made of split and pounded bamboo. This type of traditional house is still widely found in areas inhabited by the Kanekes and Baduy peoples.

=== Clothing ===
Bantenese men traditionally wear closed-neck shirts and trousers belted with batik, perhaps with a golok tucked into the belt. Bantenese women traditionally wear a kebaya, decorated with a hand-crafted brooch at the waist. Hair is tied into a bun, and decorated with a flower.

=== Islamic architecture ===
Three-level mosque architecture is symbolic of tariqa ihsan (beauty) and sharia (law).

=== Pencak silat ===
Pencak silat is a group of martial arts, rooted in Indonesian culture, which reportedly existed throughout the archipelago since the seventh century. It began to be recorded when it was influenced by the ulamas during the spread of Islam in the 15th century. At that time, martial arts were taught with religious studies in pesantren (Islamic boarding schools). Religion and pencak silat became intertwined. Silat evolved from folk dancing, becoming part of the region's defense against invaders.

Banten is known for its warriors, who are proficient in the martial arts. Debus (from Arabic: دَبُّوس, romanized: dabbūs) is a Bantenese martial art which was developed during the 16th century.

== Tourism ==
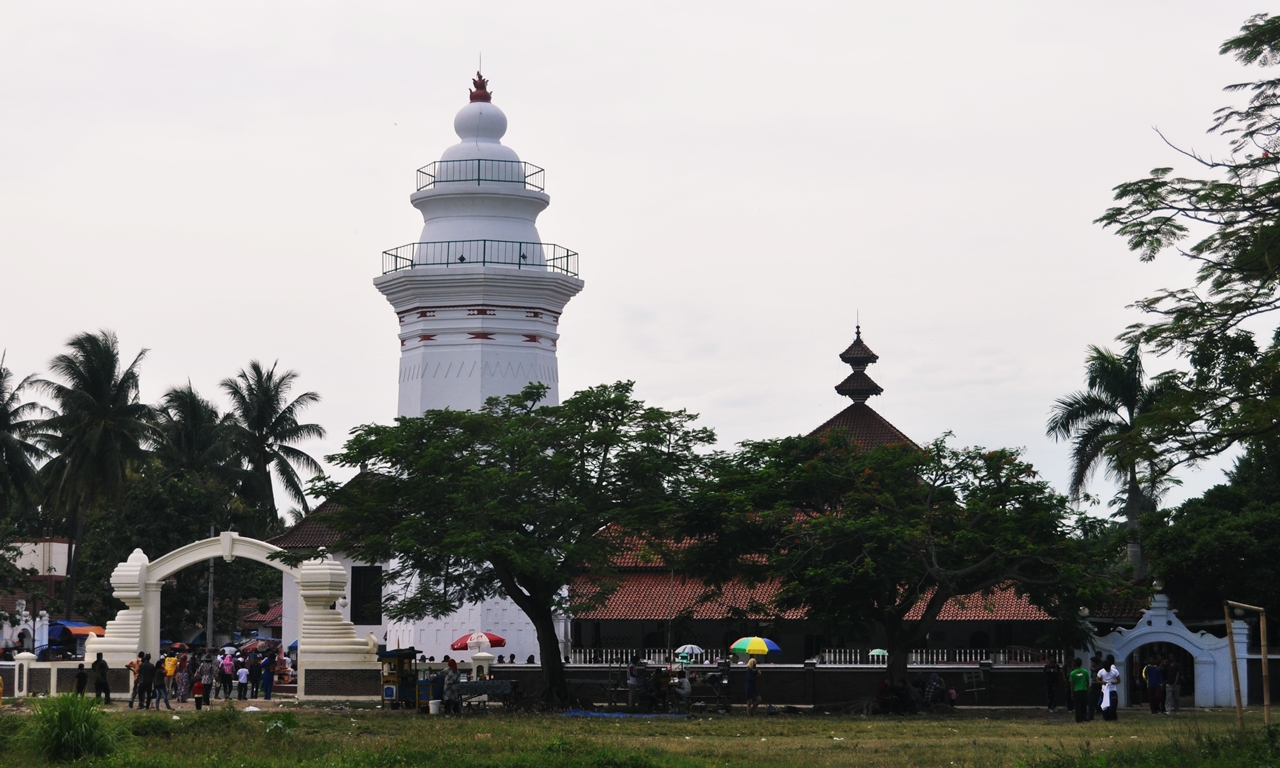
The Great Mosque of Banten

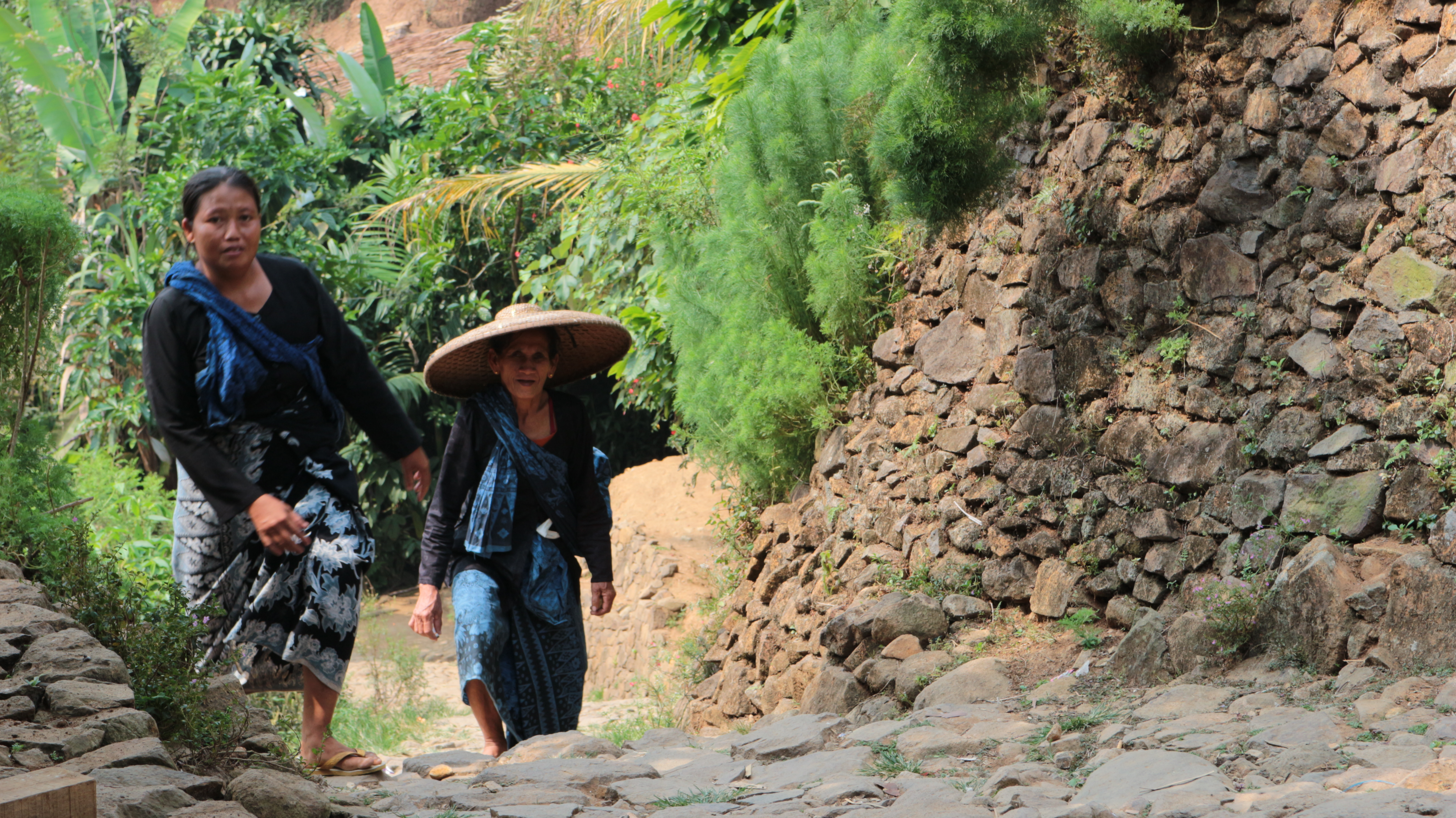
The Baduy people are one of the tribes in Indonesia who maintain a life in harmony with nature

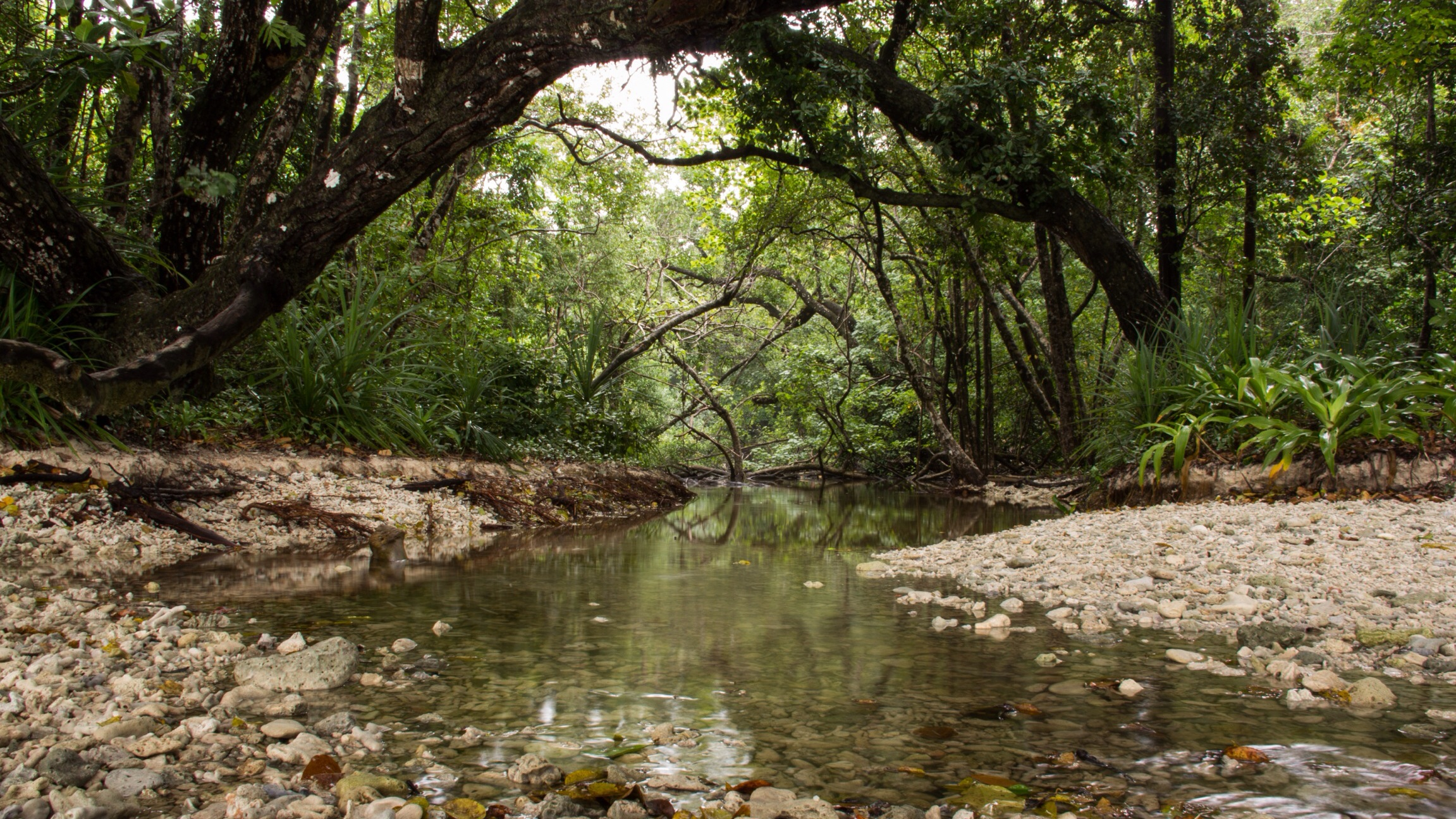
Ujung Kulon National Park in 2014

Banten is one of the favorite tourist areas in Indonesia, especially for local residents from Jakarta and West Java, especially Bogor. The Banten region, which is close to the west coast of Java Island, has a panorama located in Banten Bay such as Carita Beach, Sawarna and others as well as resort islands such as Umang and Sangiang Islands. The uniqueness of the Banten community, especially the Baduy people who still maintain their ancestral customs, is also interesting to explore, as well as the rare Javan rhinoceros sanctuary in the Ujung Kulon National Park which has been designated as a world heritage site. Banten also has historical tourist destinations such as the Great Mosque of Banten, the Old Banten Museum, the Multatuli Museum.

Tanjung Lesung Beach, in the Panimbang district of western Pandeglang Regency, covers about 150 ha (370 acres). A proposed special economic zone in 2012, the Tanjung Lesung SEZ became operational on 23 February 2015. Pulau Dua, covering about 30 ha (74 acres) near Serang, is known for its ocean coral, fish and of birds. Between April and August each year, it is visited by about 40,000 birds from 60 species from Australia, Asia and Africa. Originally an island, sedimentation has joined it to mainland Java.

== Transport ==
Banten is in western Java. In 2006, 249.246 km (155 mi) of its national roads were in good condition; 214.314 km (133 mi) were in fair condition, and 26.840 km (16.7 mi) were in poor condition. At the end of that year, 203.67 km (127 mi) of Banten's 889.01 km (552 mi) provincial road network were in good condition; 380.02 km (236 mi) were in fair condition, and 305.320 km (190 mi) were in poor condition. The province's national roads are congested; provincial roads have less traffic, and congestion is generally localized.

Rail transport is declining; 48 percent of Banten's 305.9 km (190.1 mi) rail network was operational in 2005, with an average of 22 passenger trains and 16 freight trains per day. Most lines were single-track, and the main line was the 141.6 km (88.0 mi) Merak-Tanah Abang, Tangerang-Duri, Cilegon-Cigading line, and Soekarno–Hatta Airport Rail Link serving Manggarai-Soetta Airport along with the Skytrain. Then Jakarta MRT Phase 3 with Balaraja to Cikarang, will be construction in 2024.

Soekarno–Hatta International Airport is Indonesia's main national airport. Other airports include the general-aviation Pondok Cabe Airport in South Tangerang, Budiarto Airport in Tangerang (for training), and Gorda Airport in Serang (used by the Indonesian Air Force).

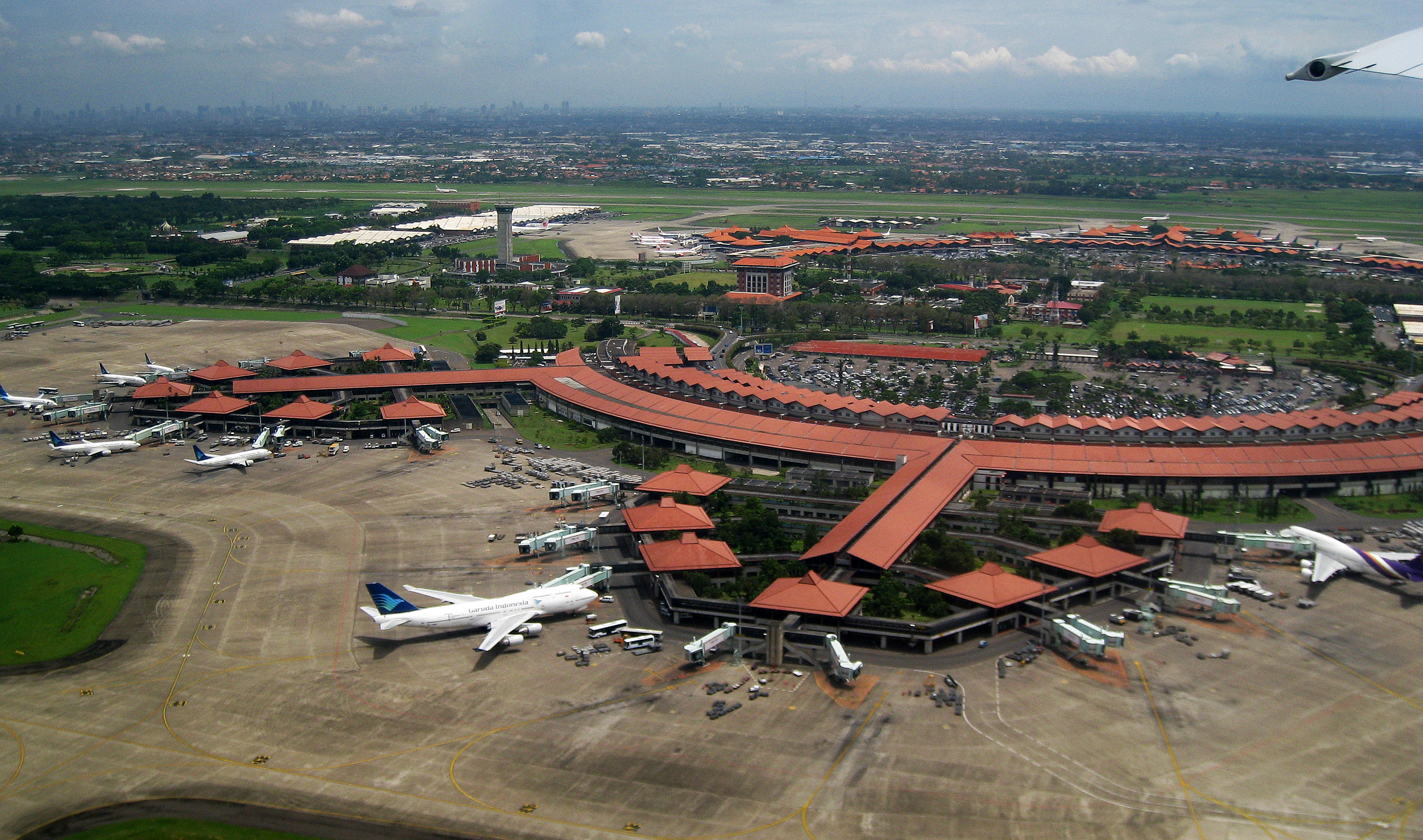
Soekarno–Hatta International Airport in Tangerang, gateway to Jakarta and Indonesia

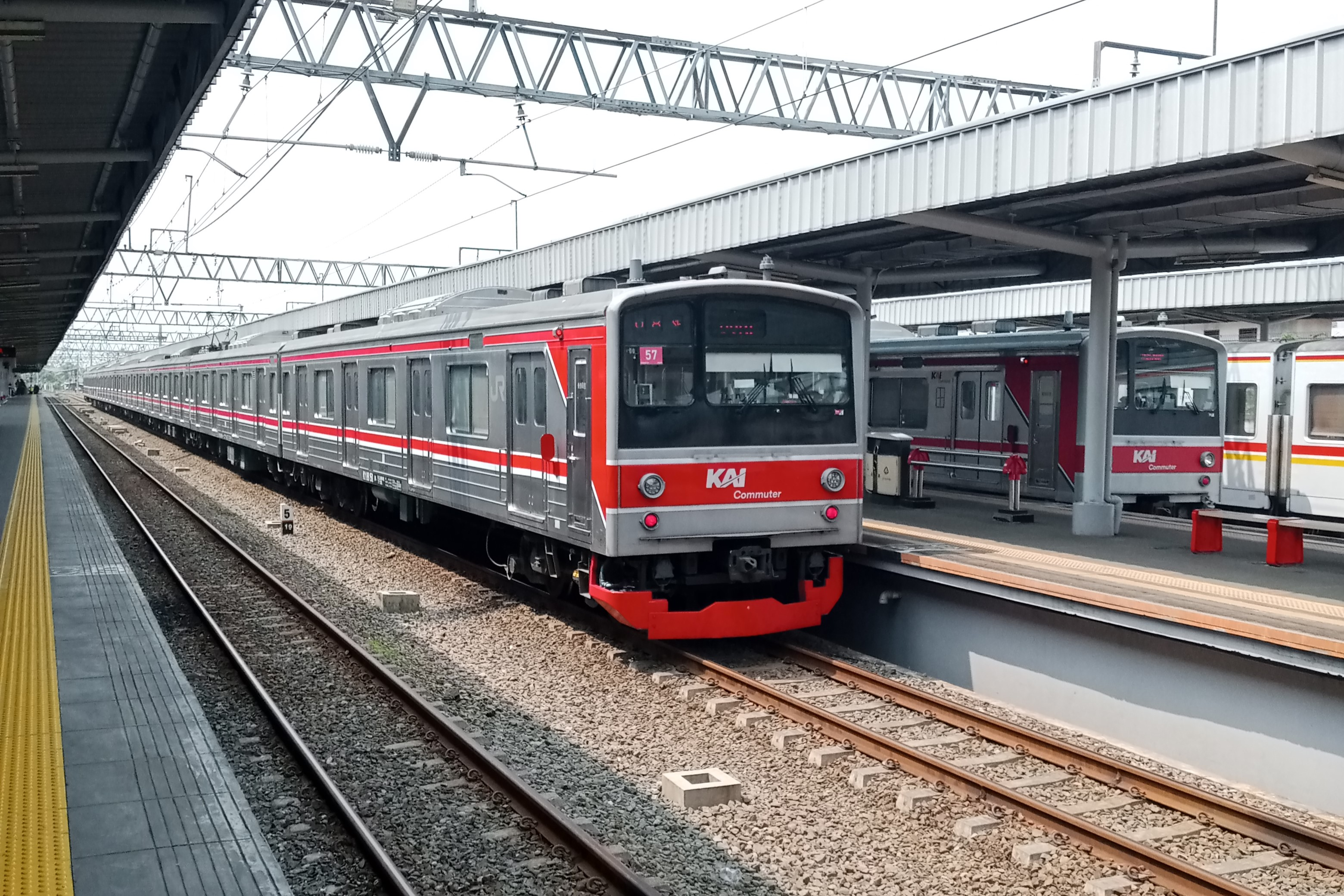
KRL Commuterline train at the Tangerang railway station

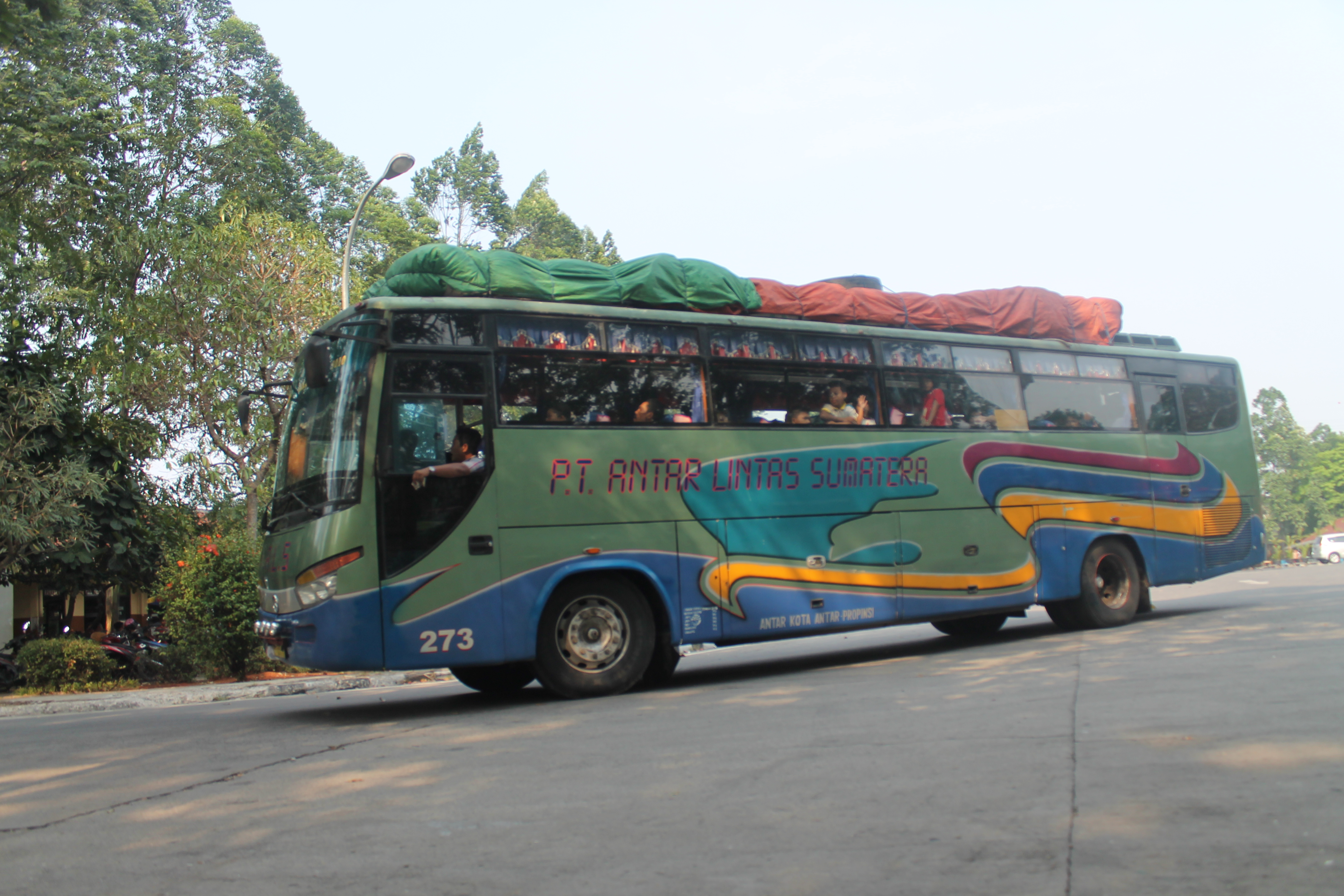
Bus at Poris terminal in Tangerang

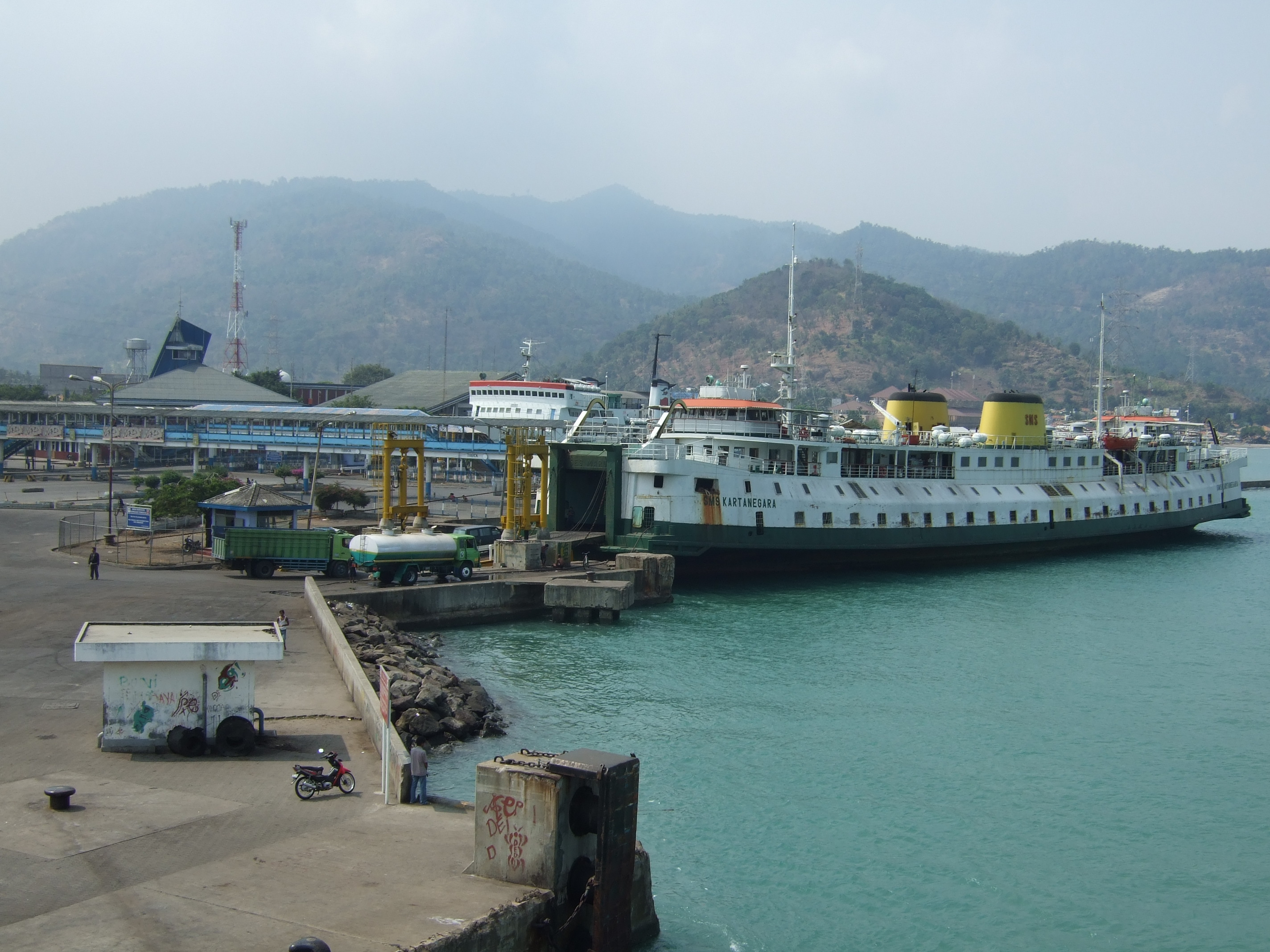
The Port of Merak has ferry service to Sumatra.

== Economy ==
Banten GDP share by sector (2022)
1. Agriculture (5.09%)
2. Manufacturing (30.5%)
3. Other Industrial (14.6%)
4. Service (49.9%)

Banten's 2006 population totaled 9,351,470, with 36.04 percent children, 2.57 percent elderly, and the remainder 15 to 64 years old. The province's 2005 Gross Regional Domestic Product (GDP) was primarily from the manufacturing industry sector (49.75 percent), followed by the trade, hotel and restaurant sector (17.13 percent), transportation and communication (8.58 percent), and agriculture (8.53 percent). Industry had 23.11 percent of jobs, followed by agriculture (21.14 percent), trade (20.84 percent) and transportation and communication (9.5 percent). The northern part of the province is more economically developed than the southern part.

It is strategically located between Java and Sumatra. Most investment is in Tangerang, South Tangerang and the rest of the north because of their infrastructure and proximity to Jakarta. Infrastructure in southern Banten lags behind that of the north, and Banten's development policies have prioritised growth over equality in Pandeglang and Lebak regencies; investors choose areas with existing infrastructure to ensure competitiveness.

== Cuisine ==
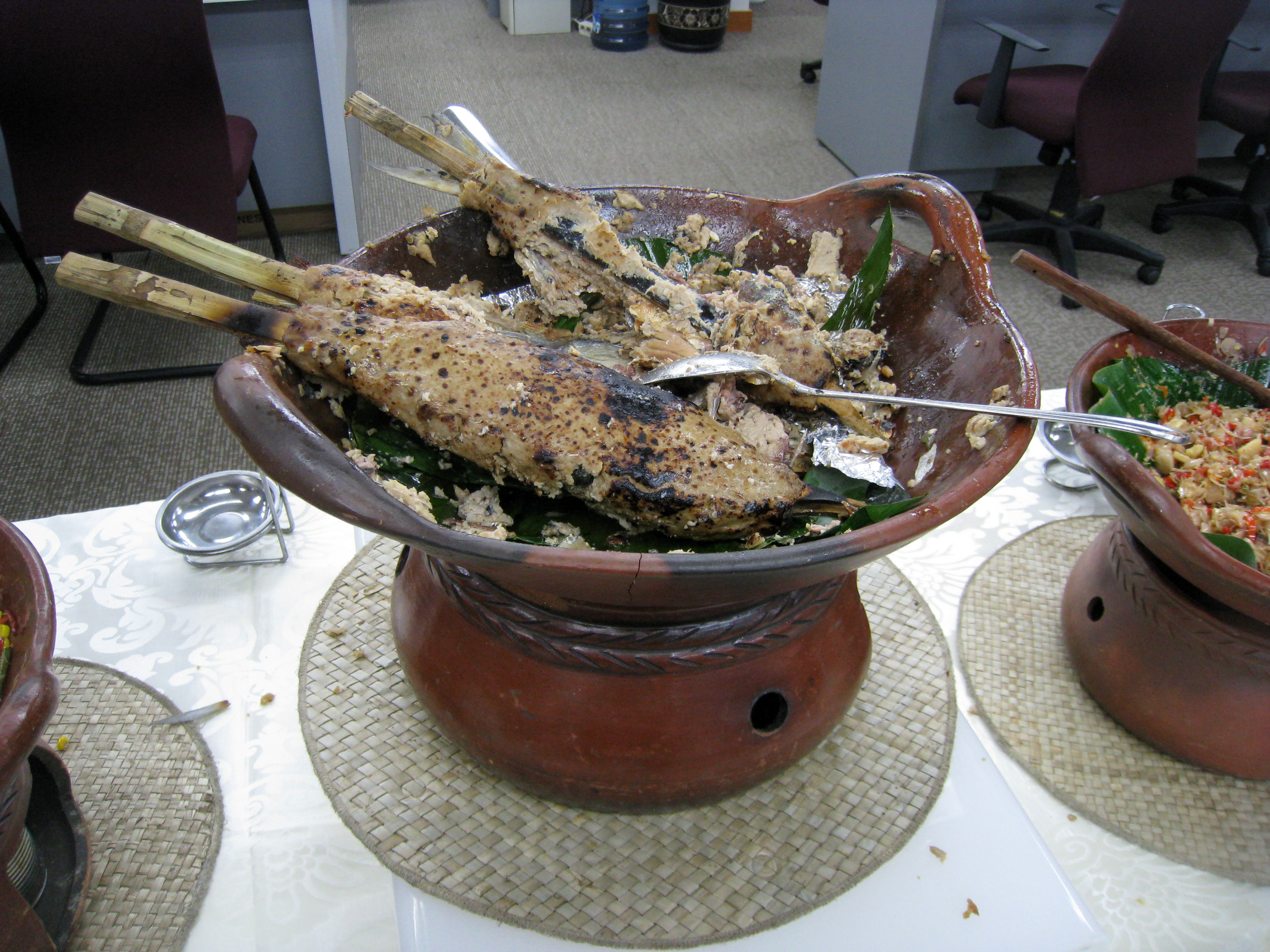
Sate Bandeng is a typical Banten food made from milkfish that has had its bones removed and the meat seasoned, skewered with bamboo, then grilled over charcoal embers

Rabeg is a Bantenese food similar to goat or curried rawon. Found in Serang Regency, it is believed to have originated in the Arabian Peninsula and was brought by Arab traders during the spread of Islam in Indonesia. Other Bantenese foods include nasi sumsum (from Serang Regency, made of white rice and buffalo-bone marrow), mahbub, shark fin soup, milkfish and duck satays, duck soup, laksa Tangerang, rice vermicelli, beef jerky and emping.

== Sports ==
=== Football ===
There are multiple football clubs based in Banten. Each of them usually represent each one of Banten's regencies and cities. Two clubs are currently playing in Super League, Persita Tangerang and Dewa United, both play at Indomilk Arena in Tangerang Regency. The rest are playing in the lower division of Indonesian football, namely Persikota Tangerang which represented the Tangerang City with its home base at the Benteng Reborn Stadium and Persic Cilegon based at Krakatau Steel Stadium in Cilegon playing in Liga 4 while Perserang Serang (with its home ground at Maulana Yusuf Stadium) playing in Liga Nusantara.

=== Motorsports ===
In 2009, the Lippo Village International Formula Circuit was built in a bid to host the A1 Grand Prix. The series was removed from the schedule, and the track was used for local motorsports before it was dismantled for the Lippo Village expansion; the paddock area was reclaimed by Pelita Harapan University. A replacement street circuit, BSD City Grand Prix, was built in BSD City for local motorsports.

== Coat of arms ==
The coat of arms of Banten consists of a shield containing a mosque dome, the Great Mosque tower, the Kaibon gate, rice stalks numbering 17 grains, cotton with 8 stalks, 4 petals, and 5 flowers, a mountain, sea, gearwheel, two runway lines, a ribbon, a Javan rhinoceros, and the motto iman taqwa.

The mosque dome symbolizes the religious character of Banten's people, while the five-pointed star represents belief in God Almighty. The Great Mosque tower symbolizes high spirit guided by the will of God. The Kaibon gate represents Banten as a gateway of world civilization, economy, and international traffic toward globalization. The yellow rice (17 grains) and white cotton (8 stalks, 4 brown petals, 5 flowers) symbolize Banten as an agrarian region, sufficient in food and clothing; the numbers 17-8-45 refer to the Proclamation of Indonesian Independence. The black mountain symbolizes natural wealth, lowlands, and highlands. The Javan rhinoceros symbolizes the people's persistence in upholding truth and being protected by law. The blue sea with 17 white waves represents Banten as a maritime region rich in marine resources. The grey gearwheel (10 teeth) symbolizes the spirit of development and the industrial sector. Two white runway lines symbolize Soekarno–Hatta International Airport's runway; the yellow beacon light represents encouragement to achieve aspirations. The yellow ribbon symbolizes the unity and integrity of the Bantenese people. The Javan rhinoceros also represents the province's identity fauna, recognized as a world heritage species.

The colors have their own meanings: red for bravery, white for purity and wisdom, yellow for glory and nobility, black for determination and perseverance, grey for resilience, blue for peace and calm, green for fertility, and brown for prosperity. The motto IMAN TAQWA (faith and piety) serves as the foundation of development towards an independent, advanced, and prosperous Banten Darussalam.

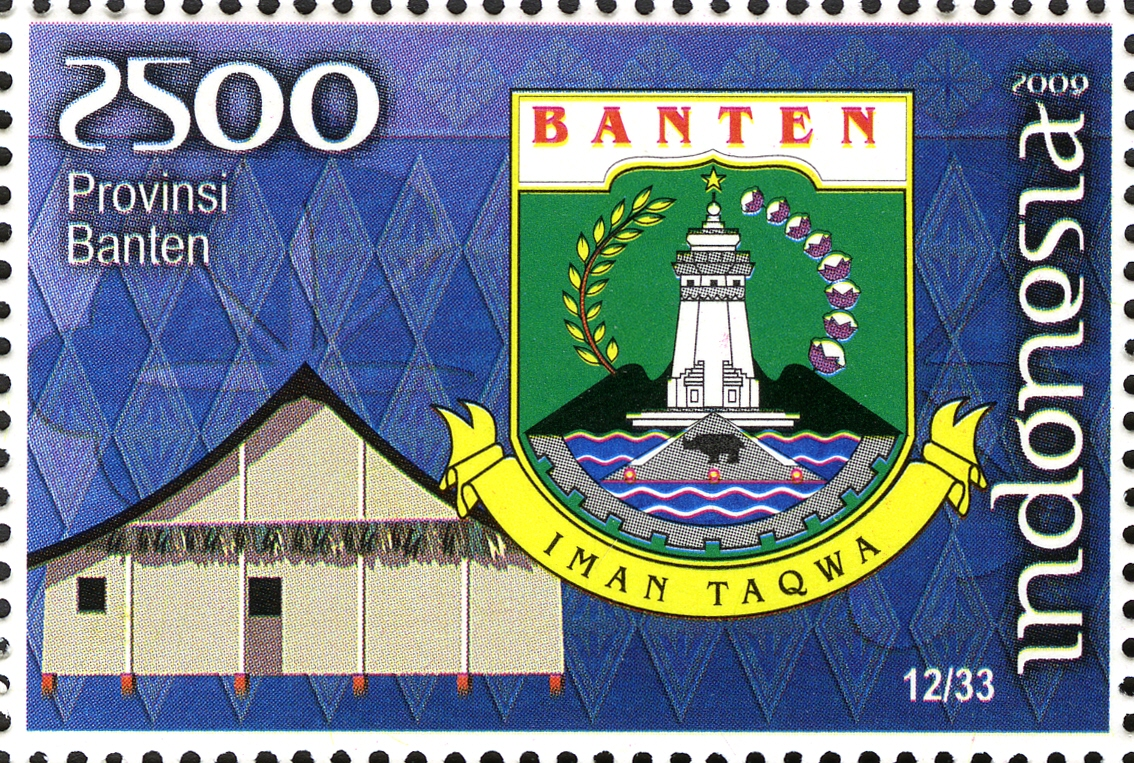
Stamp depicting the coat of arms of Banten

=== References ===
- "Coat of arms of Banten". Government of Banten. Archived from the original on 1 December 2022.
