= 2024 Serang mayoral election =

- 27 November 2024
- Turnout: 72.76% (▲3.93pp)
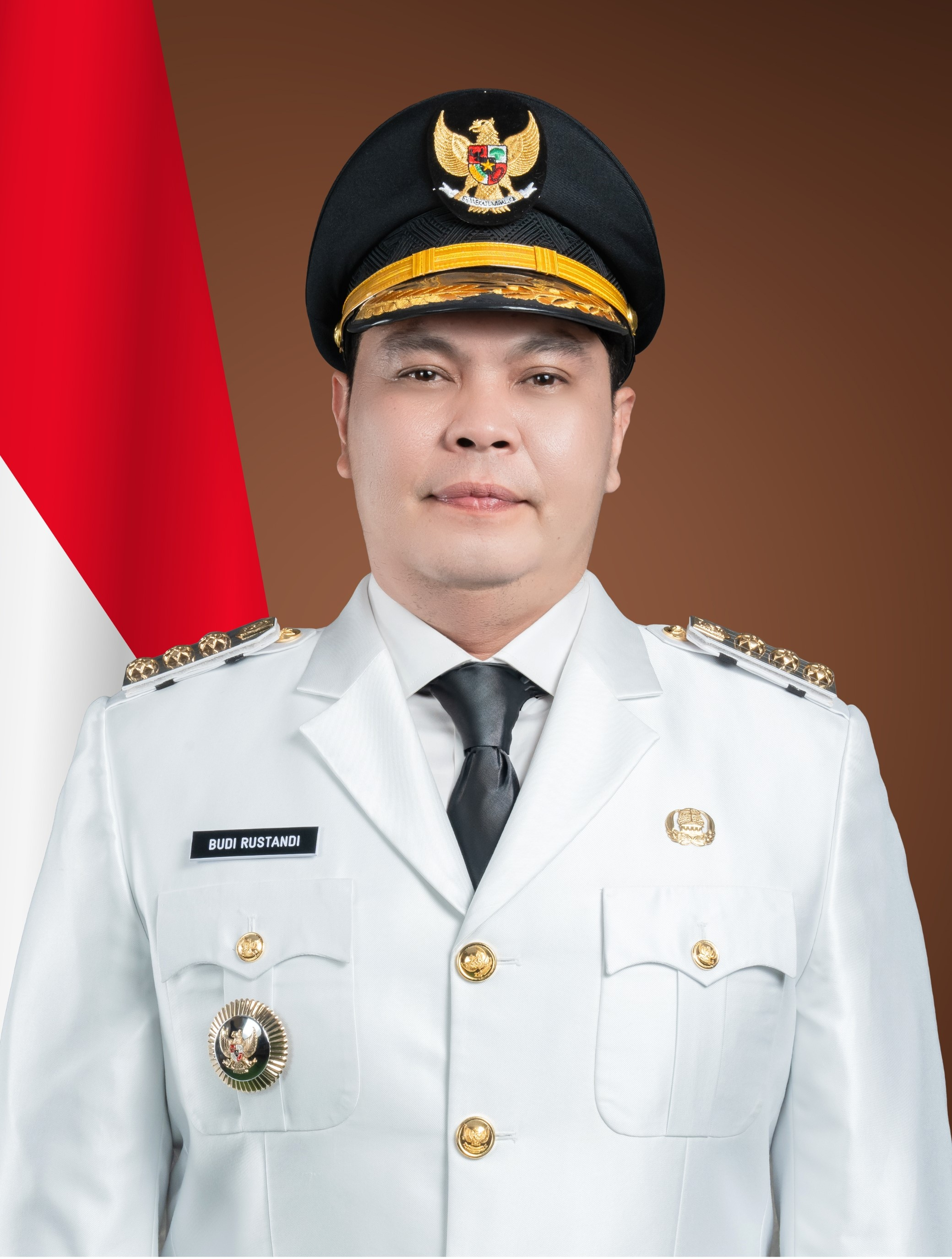

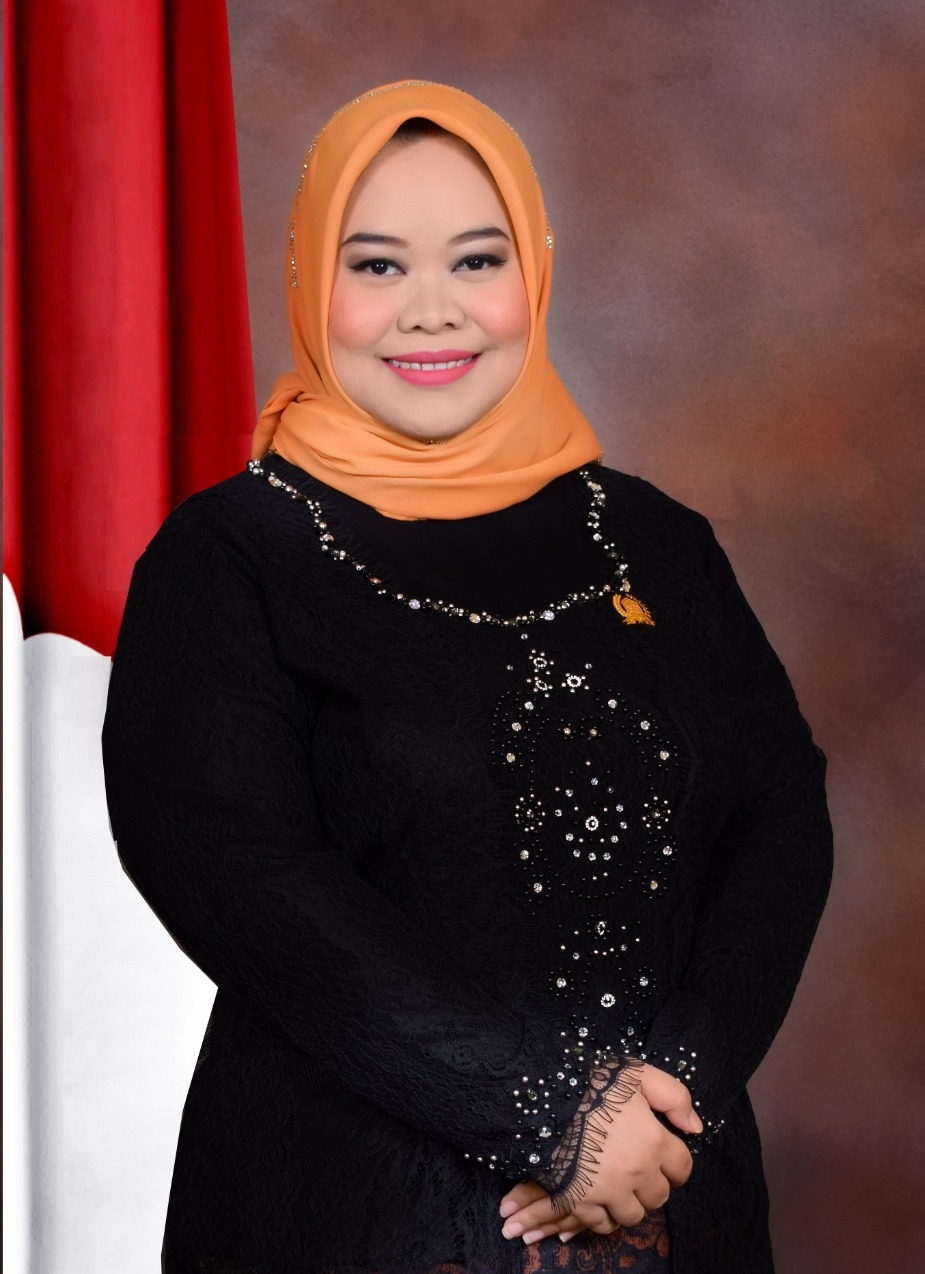

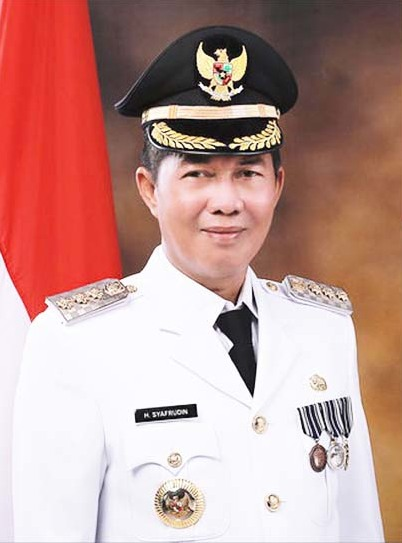
Candidate	Budi Rustandi	Ratu Ria Maryana	Syafrudin Syafe'i
Party	Gerindra	Golkar	PAN
Running mate	Nur Agis Aulia	Subadri Ushuludin	Heriyanto Citra Buana
Popular vote	212,262	78,607	61,446
Percentage	60.25%	22.31%	17.44%
Mayor before election
Nanang Saefudin (acting)
Independent
Elected mayor
Budi Rustandi
Gerindra

An election of the mayor and vice mayor of Serang, Banten, for a five-year term, was held on 27 November 2024. The election was held alongside nationwide local elections. The previous election was held in 2018. City legislator Budi Rustandi of the Gerindra Party won the election in a landslide, defeating former mayor Syafrudin Syafe'i of the National Mandate Party (PAN), and Golkar candidate Ratu Ria Maryana.

== Electoral system ==
The election, like other local elections in 2024, follow the first-past-the-post system where the candidate with the most votes wins the election, even if they do not win a majority. It is possible for a candidate to run uncontested, in which case the candidate is still required to win a majority of votes "against" an "empty box" option. Should the candidate fail to do so, the election will be repeated on a later date.

The Serang City General Elections Commission (KPU) announced on 20 September 2024 that there would be 513,851 eligible voters in the election. Rp 35.2 billion (USD 2.3 million) was set aside from the city's budget for the election.

== Candidates ==
Syafrudin Syafe'i, the previous mayor of Serang who served from 2018 to 2023, ran for a second term in the election with Banten Regional House of Representatives legislator, Heriyanto Citra Buana, as his running mate. The pair was endorsed by PAN, NasDem Party, and the Ummat Party. Syafei's candidacy had been confirmed by PAN since December 2023, with Syafe'i being the party's provincial chairman.

Speaker of the Serang City DPRD for the 2019–2024 term and head of Serang's Gerindra Party branch, Budi Rustandi, also contested the election. As running mate, Rustandi selected Prosperous Justice Party city councillor and businessman Nur Agis Aulia. The pair received further endorsements from three other parties not in the city council.

Golkar selected Ratu Ria Maryana, a deputy speaker of the city council and stepsister of former governor of Banten Ratu Atut Chosiyah. Her running mate was Subadri Usuludin, who was the vice mayor under Syafe'i from 2018 to 2023. The pair also received endorsements from Indonesian Democratic Party of Struggle, the National Awakening Party, the United Development Party and the Democratic Party, in addition to four other parties not represented in the city council.

== Campaign ==
Two rounds of public debates were scheduled to be held between the candidates, on 29 October and 12 November 2024. During the second debate, groups of candidate supporters who were not allowed to enter the debate venue ended up jeering at one another, resulting in a brief scuffle where two supporters and one police officer were injured. Another scuffle between supporters had previously occurred in September 2024 during the drawing of candidate ballot numbers, though nobody was injured.

== Results ==
Candidate	Running mate	Party	Votes	%
Budi Rustandi	Nur Agis Aulia	Gerindra Party	212,262	60.25
Ratu Ria Maryana	Subadri Ushuludin	Golkar	78,607	22.31
Syafrudin Syafe'i	Heriyanto Citra Buana	National Mandate Party	61,446	17.44
Total			352,315	100.00
Valid votes			352,315	94.23
Invalid/blank votes			21,567	5.77
Total votes			373,882	100.00
Registered voters/turnout			513,851	72.76
Source: KPU
