= Ats-Tsauroh Great Mosque of Serang =

Mosque in Serang, Banten, Indonesia

Coordinates: 6.1168°S 106.1570°E

Ats-Tsauroh Great Mosque of Serang Masjid Agung Ats-Tsauroh Serang
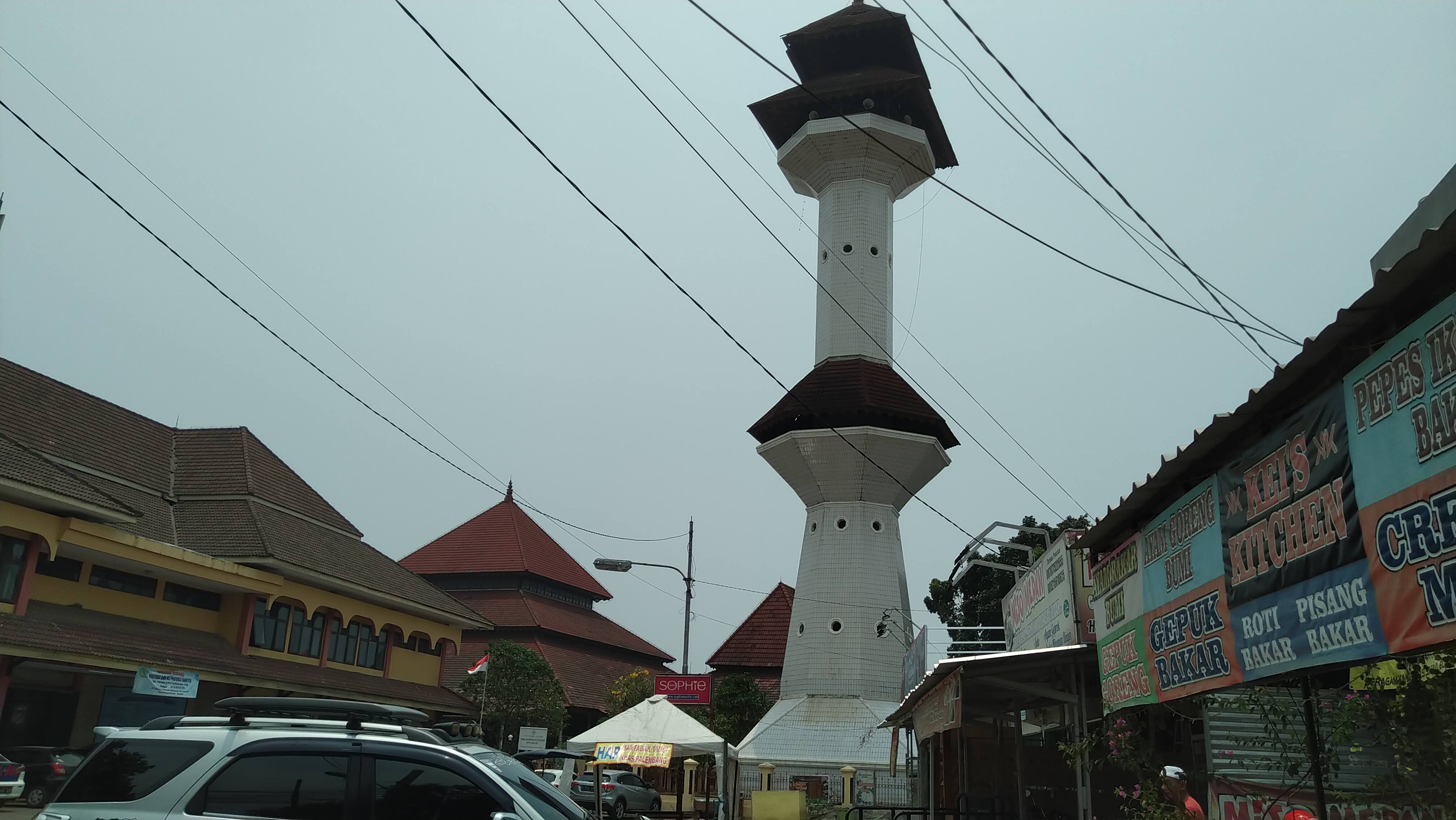

Religion
- Affiliation: Islam
- Branch/tradition: Sunni

Location
- Location: Serang, Banten, Indonesia
- Interactive map of Ats-Tsauroh Great Mosque of Serang; Masjid Agung Ats-Tsauroh Serang

Architecture
- Type: Mosque
- Style: Javanese
- Completed: 1870; Renovated 1930, 1956, 1974, 1993

Specifications
- Capacity: 2,500
- Dome: 0
- Minaret: 1

Ats-Tsauroh Great Mosque of Serang is a congregational mosque in the city of Serang, Banten, Indonesia. Founded in 1870, it is one of the oldest mosques in Banten province.

== History ==
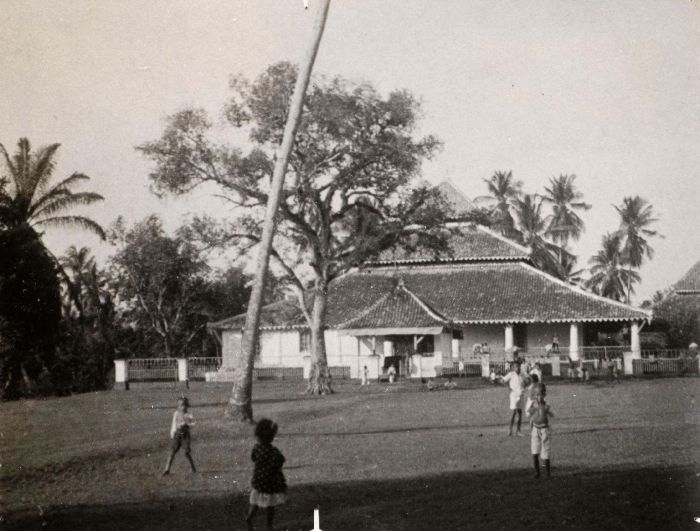
Pegantungan Mosque, ca. 1915–1926

The mosque was formerly known as Pegantungan Mosque and the Muslim community in the surrounding area initiated the establishment. The former regent of Pandeglang as well as Serang, Raden Tumenggung Basudin Tjondronegoro, endowed the current land of approximately 2.6 ha to facilitate the construction of the mosque.

Since its foundation, the mosque has been renovated several times throughout history. In the beginning, the mosque did not equip the minaret, just like the traditional Javanese Islamic architecture style. In 1930, the mosque was renovated to resemble the Great Mosque of Banten but without a minaret. In 1956, the minaret was attached after the renovation.

In 1968 the mosque was renamed to Ats-Tsauroh which means "struggle". The mosque was renovated again in 1974 and 1993.

== Architecture ==
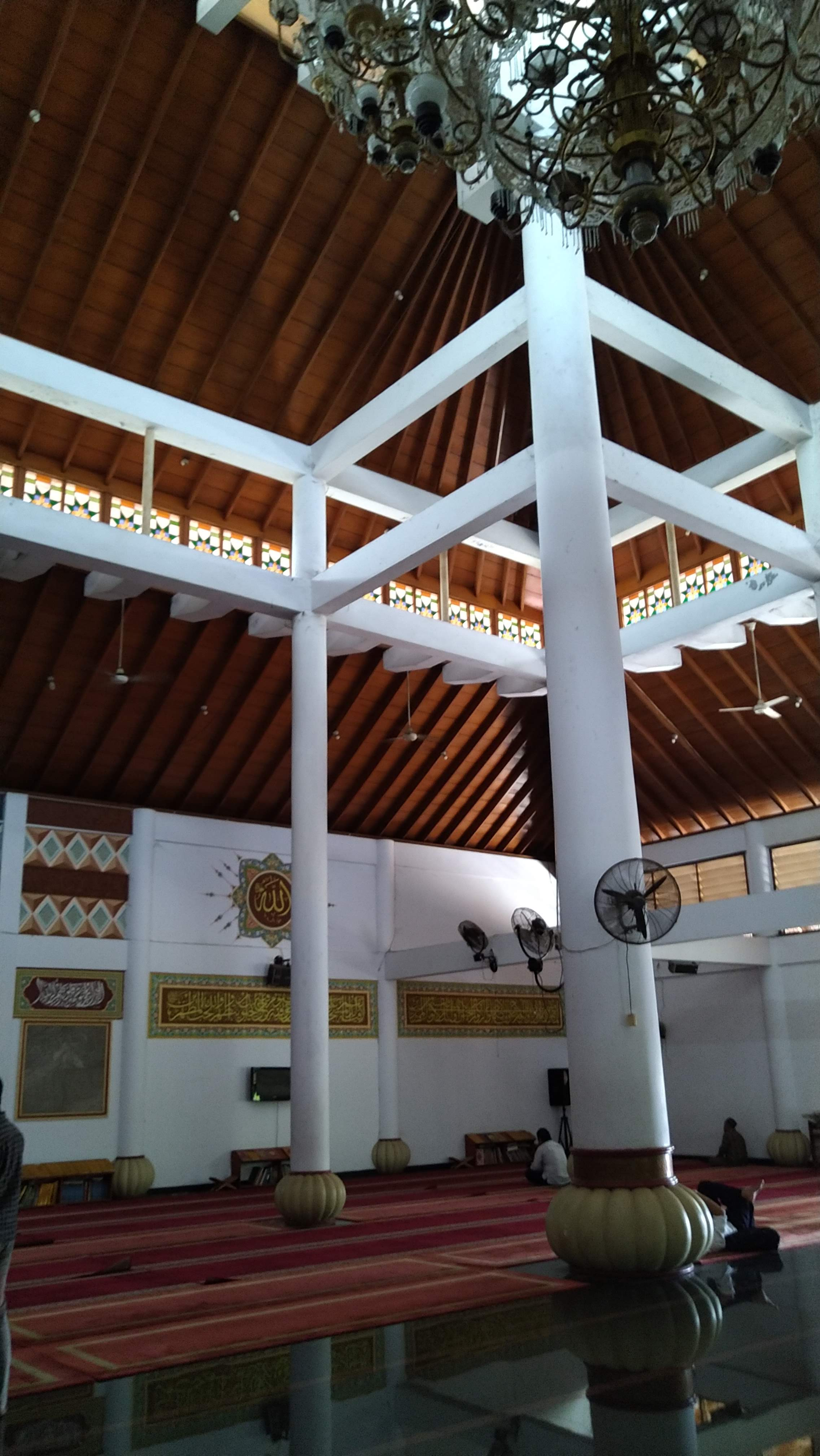
Interior, seen with pillars

Today, the mosque is built in a Javanese Islamic architectural style, most profoundly seen in the three-layered pyramidal roofs and an open pavilion-style typical to the Joglo traditional houses. The three layers signify Islamic philosophy of Iman, Islam and Ihsan. On top of the roof is a traditional Bantenese memoro ornament in the shape of a goose, built with terracotta clay ceramic.

The open-pavilion-style prayer space is supported by 16 columns, four of which are the main pillars. The use of four main pillars follows the Javanese architectural tradition, which signifies the presence of guru or mentor. These "mentor's pillars" have Islamic inscriptions written in Arabic. The base of all the columns is built in the shape of a pumpkin, which symbolizes the fertility of the Banten region.

The mihrab is decorated in Arabic calligraphy as well as Islamic geometric patterns and shaped in Chinese style.

The minaret, which was added in 1956, is hexagonal in shape and built with pyramidal roofs and memoro. The minaret is built to increase the resonance of adhan prayer call.

The location of the mosque symbolizes religious harmony; the mosque is surrounded by cathedrals of Batak Christian Protestant Church and Kristus Raja Church.
