= Kasunyatan Mosque =

Mosque in Kasunyatan, Serang, Banten, Indonesia

- Masjid Kasunyatan
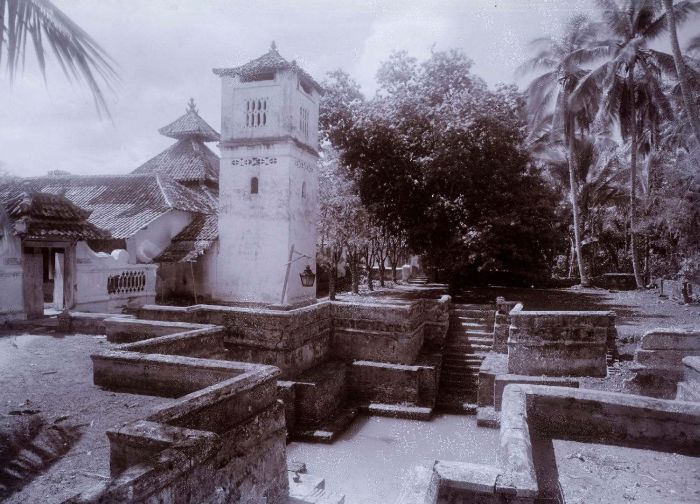
- The water well of Kasunyatan Mosque in the 1920s

Religion
- Affiliation: Islam
- Branch/tradition: Sunni
- Province: Banten
- Status: Active

Location
- Location: Kasunyatan, Serang Regency, Banten, Indonesia
- Interactive map of Kasunyatan Mosque
- Coordinates: 6.050932°S 106.157169°E

Architecture
- Type: Mosque
- Style: Eclectic Javanese, Portuguese, Hinduism
- Founder: Kyai Dukuh (Pangeran Kasunyatan)
- Completed: Between 1570 and 1596

Specifications
- Direction of façade: east
- Length: 11.50 metres (37.7 ft)
- Width: 11.30 metres (37.1 ft)
- Minaret: 1
- Minaret height: 10.82 metres (35.5 ft)
- Materials: brick, clay tiles

Kasunyatan Mosque (Indonesian: Masjid Kasunyatan) is a small mosque in the village of Kasunyatan, Banten, Indonesia. Established between 1570 and 1596, it is one of the oldest mosques in Indonesia. The mosque is located in close proximity to the ruins of Old Banten, and functioned as a 16th-century centre of Islamic study. The mosque received a heritage status during the Dutch colonial period in 1932.

== History ==
Kasunyatan Mosque is one of several mosques located around Old Banten; the other mosques are the Great Mosque of Banten and Masjid Kanari. There are remnants of other mosques in the area, such as the tower of the ruined Masjid Pecinan Tinggi, the already demolished Kraton Kaibon mosque, and the ruins of Koja Mosque. It is located outside the walled city of Surosowan Kraton, Old Banten.

Kasunyatan Mosque was founded by Kyai Dukuh, the leader of the Islamic school of thought in Banten and the teacher of the Sultan Maulana Muhammad. Kyai Dukuh, who received the title Pangeran Kasunyatan, gave his name to the village and to the mosque. The mosque was built for the community of Islamic scholars in the Kasunyatan Village. There are differing opinions about the precise date that the mosque was founded, but it was during the reign of Maulana Yusuf, somewhere between 1570 and 1596.

== The mosque complex ==
The mosque is located in the village of Kasunyatan, 500 metres south of Kraton Kaibon in Old Banten.

The mosque complex is surrounded by walls with three main gates on the west, south, and east sides. The western gate is the main entrance for the tombs on the north of the mosque complex, and also acts as a boundary between the northern tomb area and the eastern tomb area. The southern gate allows entry to the eastern tomb area. Both the western and the southern gate feature a simple curving form with ornaments; the eastern gate is the main entrance to the complex. it is 7.1 metres in length and 3.1 in height, and features the Semar Tinandhu decoration, showing Hindu-Javanese influence.

At the centre of the complex is the mosque itself. The mosque consists of a main prayer hall, surrounded by three porches (serambi) to the north, east, and south. The layout of the main prayer hall is square-shaped and measures 11.3 by 11.5 metres. The roof is built in typical Javanese mosque architecture with three tiers, supported by four main posts (saka guru) and topped with a terracota roof top decoration (mustaka). The main prayer hall's interior is constructed of white-washed brick. Two doors provide entrance to the north and south of the hall. The mihrab is located to the west of the main prayer hall and contains motifs of false columns and plant-like arabesque on top, reminiscent of the kala makara motif of classical candi architecture. The serambi of Kasunyatan Mosque is enclosed with wall, which is unusual for Javanese mosque architecture which usually has its serambi wall-less like a porch. The northern serambi includes a bedug, with an inscription marking the year the Kasunyatan Mosque received its heritage status in 1932, granted by Suria Nata Atmadja. The eastern serambi contains 18 tombs, including the tomb of Ratu Asiyah and Syekh Abdul Syukur Putra, while the southern serambi contains 5 tombs.

The mosque features a minaret, which is unusual in Javanese mosque architecture. The minaret is located on the southwest corner of the mosque. It is an 11-metre tower of white-washed brick, consisting of three floors and topped with a clay roof tiles topped with a terracotta mustaka. The minaret shows Portuguese influence. The design of the minaret shares similarities with that of the ruined Masjid Pecinan Tinggi in Old Banten.

To the west of the mosque complex is a 1.7 metre deep stepwell with a pond 3.8 metres deep, used to perform ablution. Normally, a stepwell is located in the front of a mosque; however, the stepwell of the Kasunyatan Mosque is located at the back, in order to be closer to a former river (now a lake) to the west of the mosque. This water well is now covered with corrugated steel roof.

== See also ==
- Old Banten
- List of mosques in Indonesia
