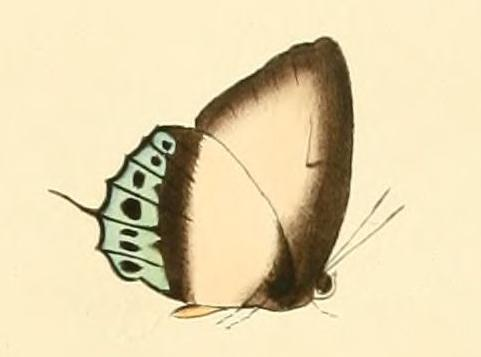

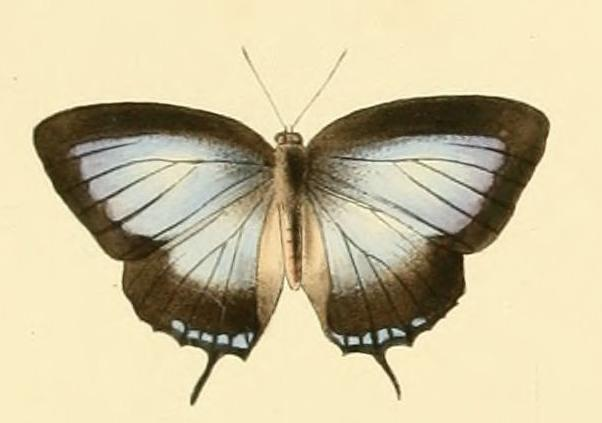

Scientific classification
- Kingdom: Animalia
- Phylum: Arthropoda
- Clade: Pancrustacea
- Class: Insecta
- Order: Lepidoptera
- Family: Lycaenidae
- Genus: Arhopala
- Species: A. critala

Binomial name
- Arhopala critala (Felder, 1860)

Synonyms
- Amblypodia critala Felder, 1860

= Arhopala critala =

Species of butterfly

Arhopala critala is a species of butterfly of the family Lycaenidae. It is found on Serang and Ambon.

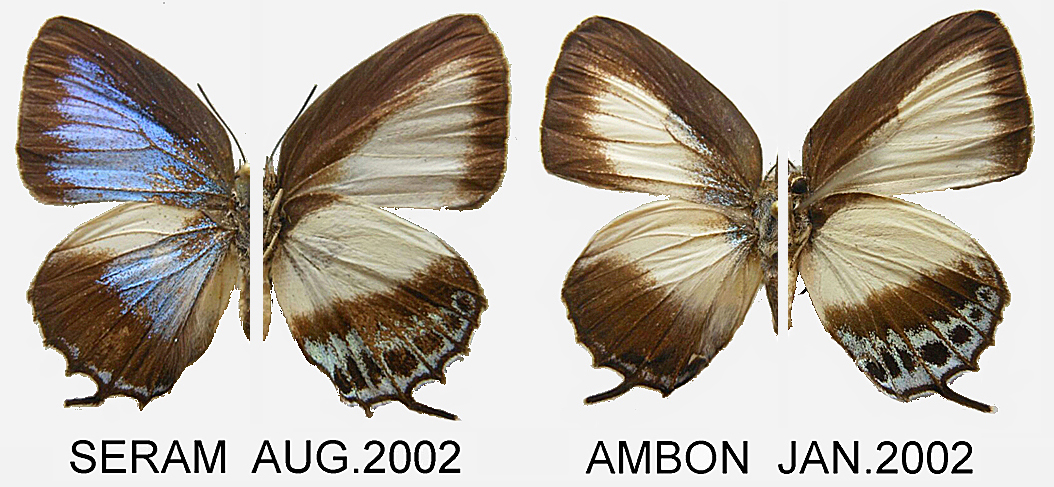

The female is above blue with a broad blackish-brown margin of the wings, in the hindwing along the posterior part of the border with a series of white-blue spots. Beneath blackish-brown with a broad, joint, whitish band, hindwing with a broad, greenish-blue, black-spotted marginal band.
