= Drangong, Taktakan =

Drangong
- Administrative village
- Interactive map of Drangong
- Coordinates: 6°06′03″S 106°08′08″E
- Country: Indonesia
- Province: Banten
- City: Serang
- District: Taktakan

Area
  - Total: 5.61 km^{2} (2.17 sq mi)

Population (2019)
  - Total: 19,354
  - Density: 3,450/km^{2} (8,940/sq mi)
- Postal code: 42162

Drangong is an administrative village or kelurahan in the district of Taktakan, Indonesia. The village has an area of 5.61 km^{2} and a population of approximately 19 thousands, making it the most populous village in the district.

The Jakarta–Merak Toll Road which connects Jakarta and Port of Merak can be accessed from the village at the Serang Barat Toll Gate.
