= Post - 1500 Southeast Asia Archaeology =

Archaeology is the study of human activity through recovery and analysis of material culture. Within Southeast Asia, this practice, within the western tradition, was introduced by European colonization. During the colonial period, the vast majority of the lands of Southeast Asia were under European control. This left the lands riddled with the remnants of this colonial history, as well as those of the peoples who sought to resist their rule. This article covers the archaeological study of those remnants.

== European colonization of Southeast Asia ==
The source of many material distributions in Southeast Asia was a result of the Silk Road era; it consisted of historical sea and land trade routes across Afro-Eurasian that connects East, South, and Western Asia with the Mediterranean and the European world. It also included North and East Africa. The Silk Road consisted of trade routes that were expanding overtime due to different colonies’ desires for specific items.

=== The Silk Road Trade ===
The 15th to 17th centuries was a time known as the “age of discovery” in Southeast Asia because of the recognition and demand of SE Asia's natural resources from European powers. In SE Asia, spices were useful and popular for creating flavor in food. Spices were in high demand and were imported and exported through the Silk Road, which flourished during the colonization period. It included black pepper, cinnamon, cardamom, ginger, turmeric, nutmeg, and cloves, etc. Nutmeg was the most popular and most expensive to get because of how scarce it was.

=== European colonization of Southeast Asia ===
The European colonization of Southeast Asia began in the 16th century when the Dutch and Portuguese colonized Southeast Asia for their spices. Throughout the 17th and 18th century, the British and Dutch began to colonize Southeast Asia. The Dutch arrived in Batavia and established Dutch East Indies. The British established themselves in the Straits Settlements, British Malaya, Borneo, and Burma. In the 19th century, the French established French Indochina. All of Southeast Asia was colonized, except Thailand.

Not only spices, but also ceramics, stoneware, and porcelain were popular items used for trading in Southeast Asia. Mainland Southeast Asia is distinguished by the ongoing complementary coexistence of two major ceramic traditions-earthenware and stoneware. The first evidence of earthware ceramics was in Japan 12,000 years ago. Pottery and clay vessels originated from China 20,000 years ago. The earliest forms of stoneware were found in Indus Valley Civilisation and China. The Xia dynasty, during 1700–1050 BCE, had evidence of the earliest forms of stoneware, which is a source of where the product originated from. Stoneware production has continued for more than three thousand years. These two basic types of clay bodies have been used for processing, amending, and forming of the clay body; the use of resins, pigments, slips, and glazes; and the development of firing procedures and kilns.

=== Dutch colonization of Indonesia ===
The Dutch used trade to change the political and physical geography of Indonesia. The first Dutch fleet arrived in Indonesia in 1596 and in 1619 they seized Jakarta (the Capital of Indonesia) and established the city of Batavia. Forts were established to ensure they maintained power and control, some of the most historic forts can be found in the Banda Islands, also known as the spice islands. A well-known fort is Fort Nassua, in the Banda Islands. It was built by the Dutch in 1609, it was the center for the Vereenigde Oost-Indische Compagnie (VOC), "United East India Company", which was the primary trading company of the Dutch. Similarly to Batavia, the Banda Islands were used as a center for trade and a place to capitalize on the spice market. In the 16th century the Banda Islands were the only known source of nutmeg, consequently making them a major site for power in the world of trade.

==== Archaeological Evidence in Dutch Forts and the Banda Islands ====
The Dutch forts, Fort Diamond and Fort Speelwijk in Banten, Java were studied and analyzed to shed light on the interaction between Bantanese elite and the Dutch East India Company (VOC). Archaeological evidence, such as utensils and vessels that were used to prepare and serve meals show that there was a sort of “reverse” colonialism were indigenous Bantanese culture had a greater influence on the Dutch, than vice versa.

Another site of archaeological work can be found in the Banda Islands. The Banda Islands, specifically an area known as Groot Walling, was studied to find whether nutmeg plantations were used as a signal of social identity. The study thus focused on material culture to see if inhabitants reacted to shifts in social and political control and the different trade distributions of goods. Findings, such as a combination of ceramic, funal remains, and starch grins were analyzed, there was evidence of both European and Chinese tradeware but European, specifically English and Dutch tradeware dominates. Findings thus suggest that indigenous inhabitants may have adopted symbols of elite power through trading. Another study, conducted by archaeologists, Carlson and Jordan, also studied Groot Walling and the culture of the plantation in the 16th century. They tested the hypothesis that the plantation was used to produce inequality and as a way for inhabitants to patrol and surveil each other. They studied the design of the plantation compound; their findings eventually refuted their hypothesis and instead suggested a different form of surveillance. A system, unlike those in the Caribbean islands which adhere to strong social control.

=== Spanish colonization of the Philippines ===
An expedition led by Ferdinand Magellan was the headwind of the Spanish conquest of the Philippine islands, followed by expeditions headed by López de Villalobos, who in 1542, named the islands after King Philip. Archeological evidence in the form of the wreckage of the San Diego ship, and the artifacts left behind suggest that the Spaniards arriving in the Philippines were there for conquest. San Diego's Astrolabe was a part of the San Diego's shipwreck, found along with many other artifacts including cannons and guns off the coast of Nasugbu, dates back to December 14, 1600. The heavy load of artillery brought over by the Spanish correlates strongly with the time of the Spanish colonization of the Philippines.

In 1564 the first moves towards colonizing were taken by Miguel Lopez de Legaspi. The Spanish city of Manila was established in the Philippines in 1571, effectively establishing Spanish roots in the Philippines. The Spanish colonizers began cutting out all threats to their grip on power, starting with the increasing Chinese population in 1603, massacring thousands of Chinese people.

==== Evidence of Philippine Archaeology ====
Archeological evidence of the presence of the Chinese in the Philippines was present in the form of the Oton Death Mask. The death mask, dated between the 14th and the 15th century A.D., was discovered by Alfredo Evangelista and F. Landa Jocan in the city of San Antonio, Oton. This archeological find suggests that the Southern Chinese traders brought this practice over to the Philippines. This mask was used to protect the dead from evil spirits. Another piece of archeological evidence that suggests Chinese presence in the Philippines is the Flying Elephant of Leona Shoal. The Flying Elephant was a blue and white china dish dating to the 15th century A.D. from the Ming dynasty in China. Not only was their cultural diffusion between the Chinese and Philippines, through diffusion of religious practices, but also material culture.

In 1941, WWII hit the Philippines with the Japanese invasion, which ultimately resulted in the Philippine-US forces being defeated in 1942. Many Japanese artifacts are still being found until this day in the Philippines, including five Japanese warships from the battle of Surigao Strait in 1944.

=== British colonization of Singapore ===
Insular Southeast Asia is known as one of the most beautiful regions on earth today. When people immerse themselves into the various cultures that are a part of Southeast Asia, they find that influences from colonialism have shaped the native people's perspectives and ways of life. For example, Singapore has been colonized by British influence, and has resulted in adaptation to their culture. Through this adaptation, colonization from Britain has allowed the native people of Singapore to develop interest in finding their roots through archaeological excavations. Archaeology in Singapore is relatively new, with excavations beginning in the 20th century. The findings, however, have dated back to ancient China.

Taking it back to the beginning of colonization, Stamford Raffles of Britain colonized Singapore in 1819. He identified the island as a choice for a new port, and began negotiations with the ruler of the land at the time, the Sultan of Johor. Upon agreement, a treaty was signed and modern Singapore was born. Not until 1824 did the entire region of Singapore land in Britain's possession. In 1826, Singapore was included in the Straits Settlements, which were a larger collection of Southeast Asian countries that were made British colonies. Trade and export became a huge part of Singapore, and through this was once considered the main place for trading and exporting by the British. The people of Singapore had then acclimated the surrounding culture, allowing them to adopt British mannerisms and ideologies which are still valid in modern Singapore. World War II prompted a change in ruling for Singapore. The failure of Britain to successfully defend Singapore had destroyed their credibility and trust. After a decline in order of the country, the infrastructure and economy started to steadily rise with the rising demand of tin and rubber from other regions.

==== Singaporean archaeology ====
Interest in Singaporean Archaeology had not risen until 1984, but there was a long history of findings by Raffles himself upon first contact with the land. He discovered abundant remains of ancient settlement, with ruins of buildings made from brick, Chinese antiques and remains dating back to the ninth century. What these findings confirmed was the following of ancient Malay tradition and culture. Due to lack of interest, this was not pursued or investigated further, even after the discovery of stone tools in the 1890s and ancient jewelry in 1920s. 1984 was the year when the National Museum of Singapore was interested and received a grant from a Dutch petroleum company to begin a ten-day excavation. The site of interest was Fort Canning, Singapore, where an artillery fort had been built in 1858. The hill also was the site of an ancient palace which existed when Britain landed there in 1819. The most common items found within this excavation were ancient Chinese porcelain pottery and stoneware from the Yuan dynasty. Evidence of ancient Singapore economy and trading had been found when bronze Chinese coins were discovered, the main form of trade during pre-colonial times. These bronze coins served as a wider piece of evidence for the growth of metals in Southeast Asia, proving the heavy use of iron, copper, and gold, especially in Fort Canning. Items used in daily life were found as well, among the most popular were Chinese cast iron pans, commonly known as woks. Copper used in Singapore was found to be exported from another Southeast Asian country, most likely Sumatra. Pottery was found to be one of the biggest forms of art in ancient Singapore. It was admired so much that pieces of pottery were included in burials of the people living in Singapore.

=== French and British colonization of Vietnam ===
Alongside a new world for Vietnam, it was a change that many had to adjust to; as this was their new home. Recent findings allowed archeologist to conclude that the main exports were “tobacco, indigo, tea and coffee”. These are just some of the new changes that the people were beginning to see during this time. The French had influenced those living in Vietnam, which essentially became referred to as the “French Indochina”. This was a combination of 3 Vietnamese regions (North, Centre and South).

==== Architecture and Archaeological Evidence ====
As archaeologists continued to study and find evidence of the colonization of the Vietnamese, it was very clear within their architecture. In the city of Hanoi, “enclaves of colonial architecture are still very visible. The French settlers wanted to turn this city into the capital of their Asian Empire, and made many grand constructions in pursuit of this”. The main goals for a lot of these architectures were to essentially forget that one was living in Vietnam as though it was not a very settling and calming place. Instead, they were motivated to execute the idea of originality and culture of the country they were in, and intertwine what they believed to be the superior culture. Another example, which was found, was that of the Hanoi Opera House. Within this structure, it had a heavy focus on “European balconies and pillars” alongside French style cafes and cinemas. Aside from these influences that the French had on Vietnam there were influences on religion that took place after the 16th century.

The British in the 16th century wanted to open Vietnam up for trade. However the ruler at the time was against foreign ideas. The authors Jennifer Llewellyn, Jim Southey, and Steven Thompson (2014) found that the Vietnamese rulers wanted to abolish Catholicism and bring back Confucian ideology. Eventually the trade deals were accepted from the French, and around the 1750s Pope Clement XII wanted Vietnam to be split up into two spheres. The first being the Portuguese missionaries and the second being French missionaries.

=== British colonization of Brunei ===
Brunei, a state located on the island of Borneo in Southeast Asia, first established itself as significant and powerful territory but declined from contact with the British government in Borneo's expansion of trade in the Southeast Asian area. From severed relationships from alleged piratical acts with the Spanish, Borneo suffered leading to Early European intrusions in trading ports. By the end of the 17th century, Borneo's own decline led to Brunei's own deterioration over control of neighboring territories.

When Brunei was made a conquest for an expedition by the Portuguese, the island was found to be linked into Southeast Asia and China's trading network. Brunei developed a strong commercial and political relationship with the other Southeast Asian states. This relationship soon severed and Brunei's political and commercial power began to decline from the result of British ports in Southeast Asia. These ports allowed for goods to be imported and exported from local traders at a cheaper price compared to Malay ports. Evidence of the relationship with India, China, and the Spanish was found in archaeological history in the 18th century on the island of Labuan as settlement for the East India company. In 1775, the company was driven away by piracy and the E.I.C gained exclusive rights to trade in pepper in return for protection. However, trade policies were threatened with the Portuguese in spice islands, Spanish in the Philippines, and the Dutch in the South. Direct trade suffered and pepper territories became expired. By the 18th century, Brunei sultans had minimal control over trade districts, leading to more piracy and oppression towards pepper traders and planters.

==== Treaty of Labuan and North Borneo Charted Company ====
In mid-19th century, British addressed Brunei on the suppression of piracy and decreased the extension and promotion of trade. In year 1847, a treaty was reached between Great Britain and Brunei to allow for mutual suppression of piracy and commercial relations. During the 1980s, the Sultan had made multiple treaties with the British consul which eventually led to the British forming the British North Borneo Company. Brunei began to dwindle from these treaties, but sociocultural changes appeared in the 20th century when a coal mining lease in 1882 was granted in Muara, Brunei and oil was discovered in 1926.

==== Archaeological Evidence in Coal and Oil Mining ====
Archaeological evidence of a variety of copper, antimony ores, gold and plumbago were found in these locations. Brunei improved as a state when revenues acquired from years of coal and oil mining. Discovery of oil led to economic freedom, demographic changes, infrastructure, and educational opportunities. Centuries of trade oppression with the British weakened Brunei as a state, eventually leading to limited findings of data and material culture of the Brunei community and archaeological work today.

== See also ==
- Silk Road
- Dutch East Indies
- French Indochina
- Ferdinand Magellan
- Japanese occupation of the Philippines
- Straits Settlements
- East India Company
- Treaty of Labuan
- North Borneo Chartered Company
