= Budi Rustandi =

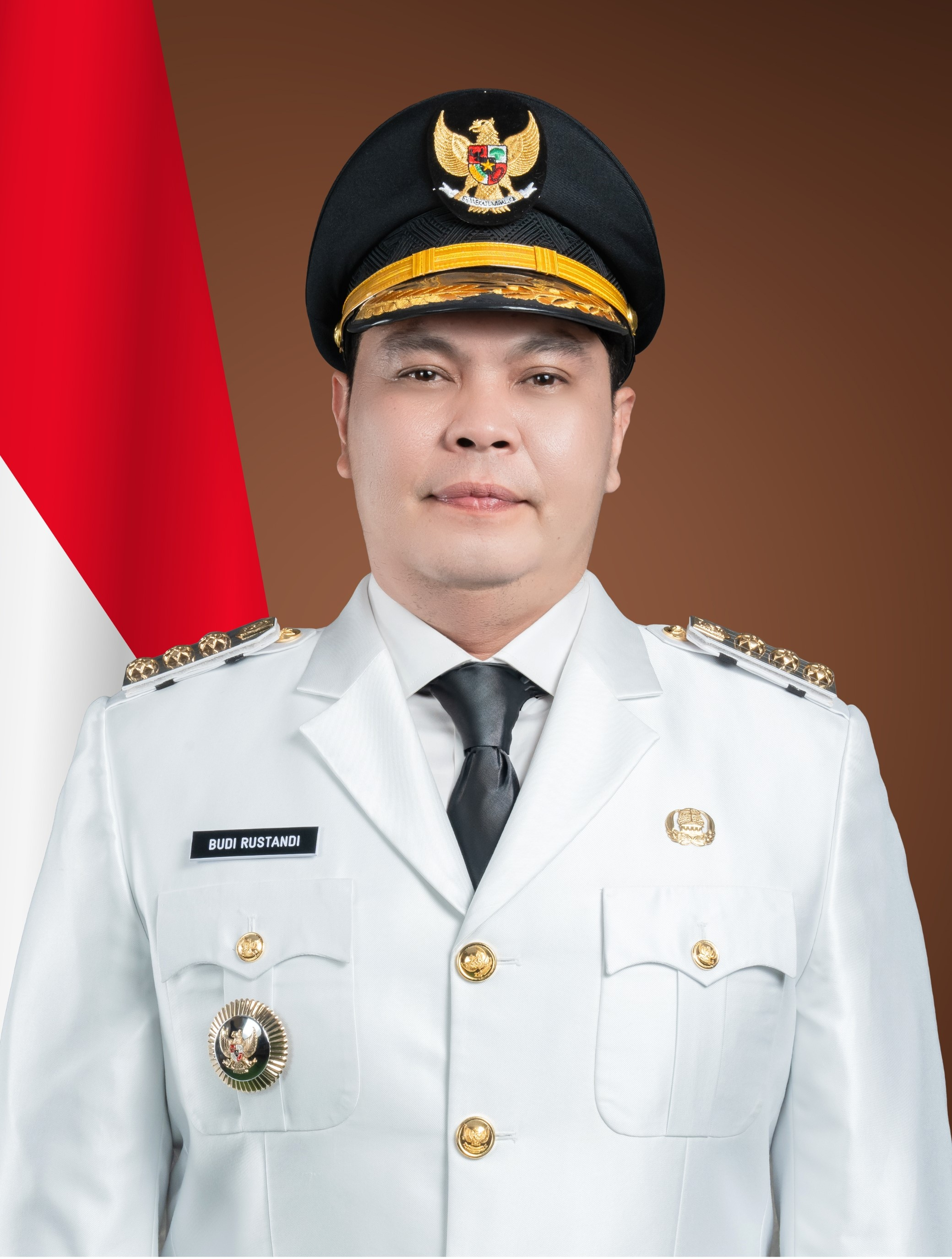
- 2025 portrait

Mayor of Serang
- Incumbent
- Assumed office 20 February 2025
- Preceded by: Nanang Saefudin (act.); Syafrudin Syafe'i

Personal details
- Born: 28 November 1979 (age 46) Serang, West Java, Indonesia
- Party: Gerindra

Budi Rustandi (born 28 November 1979) is an Indonesian politician of the Gerindra Party and businessman who is the mayor of Serang, Banten. He had previously served as a member of Serang's city council in 2014–2024 and was its speaker from 2019–2024.

== Early life ==
Budi Rustandi was born in Serang on 28 November 1979. He studied at a public elementary and public middle school there, before graduating from high school in 1998. He later received his bachelor's degree in 2019 from Bina Bangsa University in Serang.

== Career ==
Rustandi engaged in business before his entry to politics in the 2014 election, when he was elected into Serang City's Regional House of Representatives (DPRD) as a Gerindra Party member. He was elected for a second term in 2019 election, and was elected speaker of the DPRD. As DPRD speaker, Rustandi pressured the municipal government to increase tax revenues, and called for infrastructure improvements to a designated 1,000-hectare industrial zone in the city.

In 2024, Rustandi ran in Serang's mayoral election, with the support of Gerindra, PKS, and three smaller parties. His running mate was PKS' DPRD member Nur Agis Aulia. The pair won 212,262 votes (60.25%) in a three-way race, defeating previous mayor Syafrudin Syafe'i. Rustandi and Aulia were sworn in as mayor and vice-mayor on 20 February 2025.

As mayor, Rustandi announced a river engineering program on the Ci Banten section within the city for flood control purposes, in addition to providing an irrigation source for farmers around the city. As part of the program, the Sukadana neighborhood within the city was displaced and relocated to government-owned flats.

== Personal life ==
He is married to Arfina, and the couple has five children.
