= Taktakan, Serang =

Taktakan
- District
- Location within Java
- Country: Indonesia
- Province: Banten
- City: Serang

Area
  - Total: 47.88 km^{2} (18.49 sq mi)

Population (2019)
  - Total: 92,361
  - Density: 1,929/km^{2} (4,996/sq mi)
- Postal code: 42162
- Area code: (+62) 254

Taktakan is a district of Serang Municipality, the capital city of Banten, Indonesia. It's the westernmost district of the city which borders the regency.

The municipal landfill, TPAS Cilowong, is located in the west part of the district.

== Kelurahan (Administrative Villages) ==
Taktakan District is divided into thirteen kelurahan or administrative villages:

- Cibendung
- Cilowong
- Drangong
- Kalang Anyar
- Kuranji
- Lialang
- Pancur
- Panggungjati
- Sayar
- Sepang
- Taktakan
- Tamanbaru
- Umbul Tengah
