= Al-Bantani Grand Mosque =

Mosque in Serang, Banten, Indonesia

Coordinates: 6.1722°S 106.1589°E

Al-Bantani Grand Mosque Masjid Raya Al-Bantani

Religion
- Affiliation: Islam
- Branch/tradition: Sunni

Location
- Location: Serang, Banten, Indonesia
- Interactive map of Al-Bantani Grand Mosque; Masjid Raya Al-Bantani

Architecture
- Type: Mosque
- Style: Bantenese; Ottoman
- Groundbreaking: 2008
- Completed: October 4, 2010
- Construction cost: 94.3 billion Rp. (6.4 million USD)

Specifications
- Capacity: 10,000
- Dome: 1
- Minaret: 8

Al-Bantani Grand Mosque is a congregational mosque in the city of Serang, Banten, Indonesia. With a capacity of 10,000 pilgrims, it is the second largest mosque in Banten province after the Al-Azhom Grand Mosque.

== History ==
The groundbreaking of the mosque began in 2008, and the construction was completed in 2010. The completion year of the mosque was adjusted to match the ten-year anniversary of Banten province. The mosque was inaugurated by the then governor of Banten province, Ratu Atut Chosiyah. The inauguration of the mosque was held together with the release of 30,000 Mus'haf (religious manuscripts) of Al-Qur'an al-Bantani, as well as the launch of hajj administration office which covers the Banten area.

The mosque was initially planned to be named after then governor Chosiyah, and several names were proposed, including "Al-Chosiyah Grand Mosque", "Al Chosiin Mosque", "Baitul Chosiin Mosque", "Al Chosiyain Mosque", as well as "Al-Chosiyah Al Bantani Mosque". However, this caused controversy among the Muslim community in the region.

The mosque was later officially given the current name based on the government decree No. 451.2/Kep.546-Huk/2010. The name "Bantani" is an Arabic term for Banten, and many ulamas from the Banten region who served in Saudi Arabia used the term "Al-Bantani" to describe their names. This includes the renowned Muslim scholar from Serang, Nawawi al-Bantani who served the imam of the Masjid al-Haram in Mecca, who is celebrated through the current name of the mosque.

== Design ==
The architectural design employs element of the traditional Javanese/Bantenese Islamic architectural styles, as well as the Ottoman architectural style. Ottoman influence is seen in the use of four minarets that surround the building in the four corners, which resembles the arrangement of the Sultan Ahmed Mosque in Istanbul. The "Nusantara" style or the vernacular Indonesian style can be seen from the use of three-layered roofs topped with a dome. This construction resembles the design of the Great Mosque of Central Java in Semarang, which is also known for an eclectic mixture of the Indonesian, Middle Eastern, and European architectural styles.

The interior is noted for the absence of any columns, which creates an additional space for congregational prayer and the roomy impression. The mosque is notable for its capacity of 10,000 pilgrims which makes it the largest in Banten province. The interior is decorated with the Islamic calligraphy adorned with Javanese motifs.

== Gallery ==
Minaret of the mosque

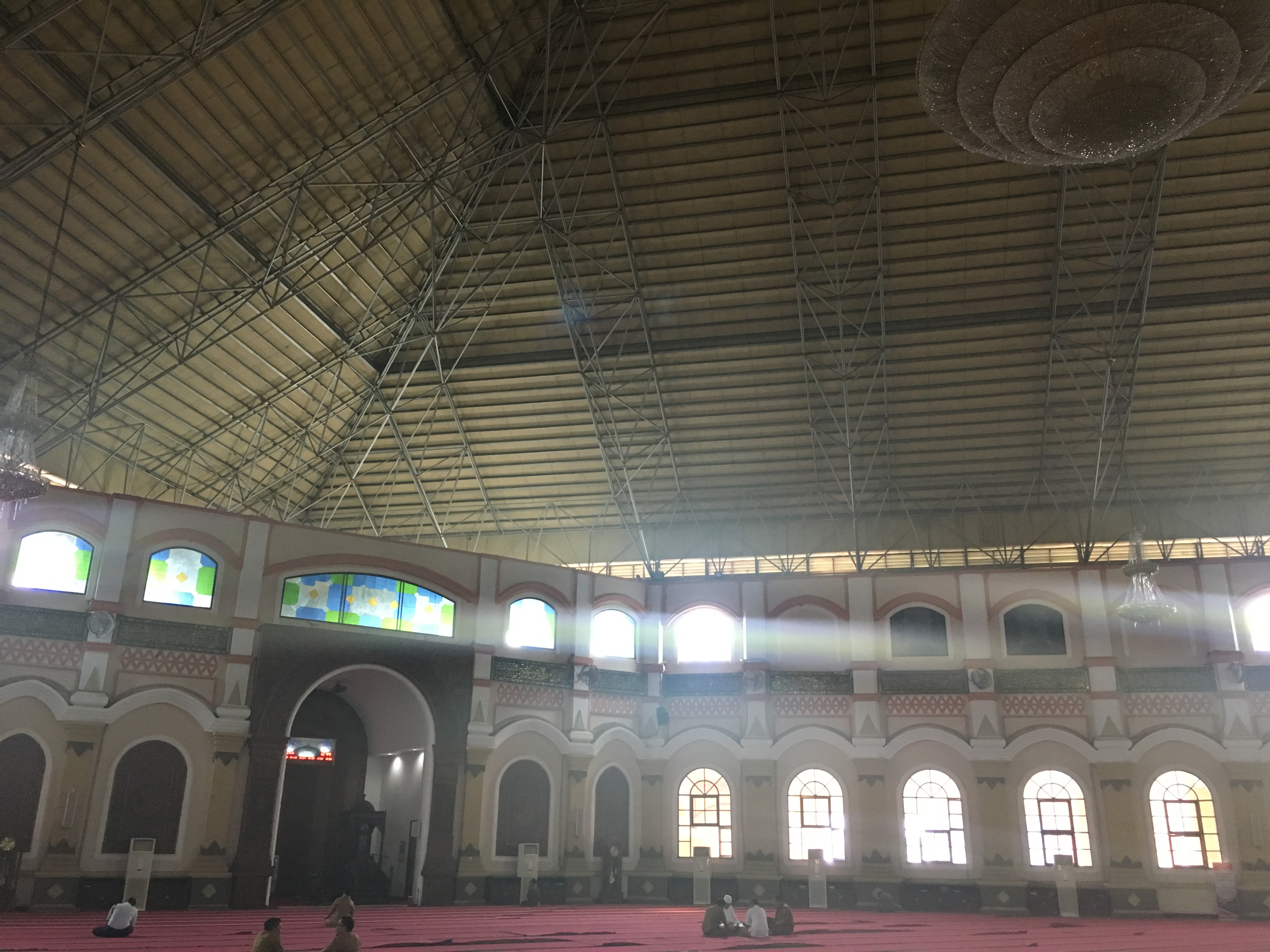
interior
