= Great Mosque of Banten =

Mosque in Banten, Indonesia

- Masjid Agung Banten
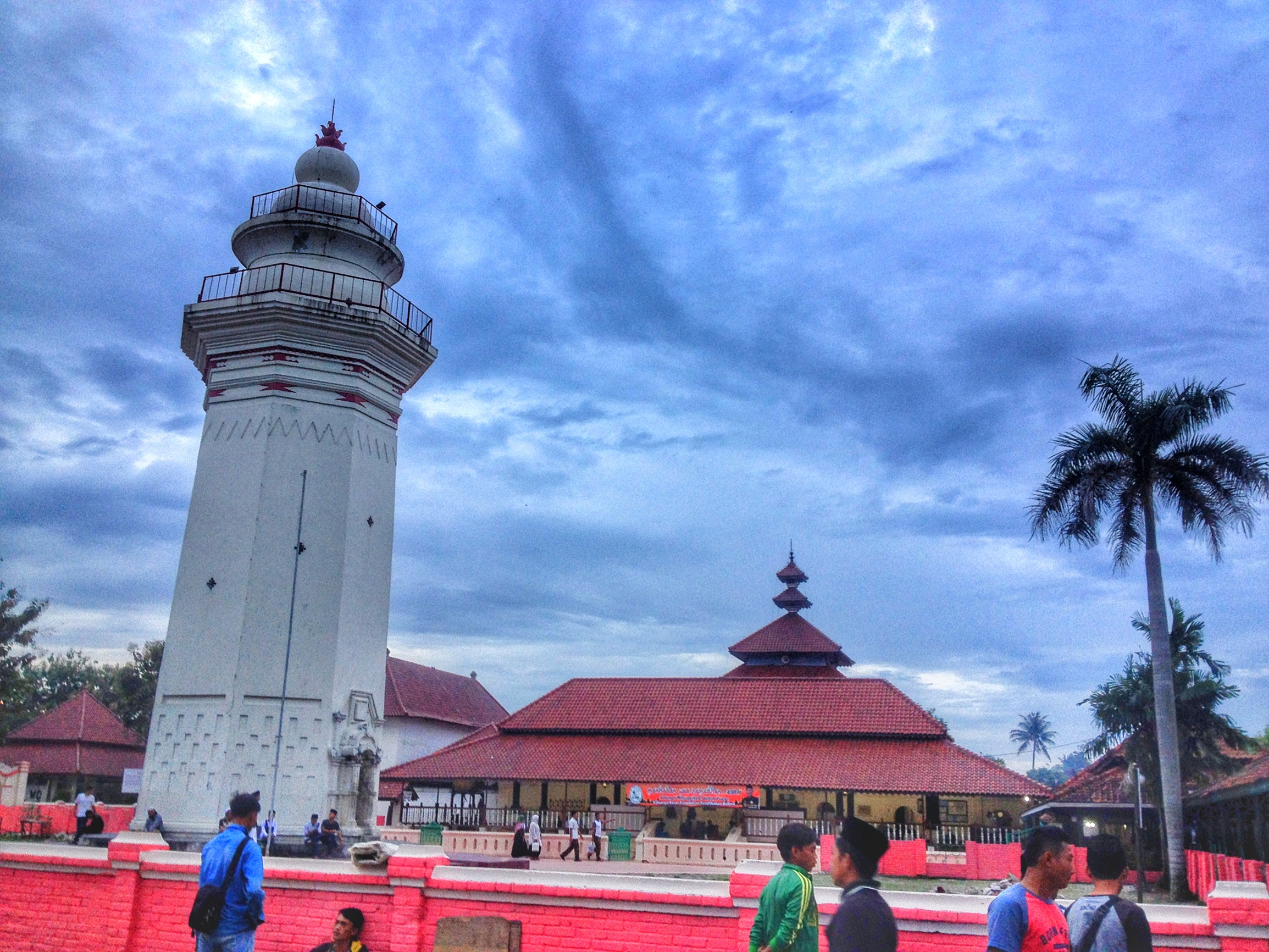

Religion
- Affiliation: Islam
- Branch/tradition: Sunni
- Province: Banten
- Status: Active

Location
- Location: Old Banten, Indonesia
- Interactive map of Great Mosque of Banten
- Coordinates: 6.035999°S 106.154017°E

Architecture
- Type: Mosque
- Style: Javanese vernacular
- Completed: 1566

Specifications
- Direction of façade: East
- Minaret: 1
- Minaret height: 24 metres (79 ft)

Great Mosque of Banten (Indonesian: Masjid Agung Banten) is a historic mosque in Old Banten, 10 km (6.2 mi) north of Serang, Indonesia. The 16th-century mosque was one of the few surviving remnants of what used to be the port city of Banten, the most prosperous trading center in the Indonesian archipelago after the fall of Demak Sultanate in mid-16th century.

== History ==
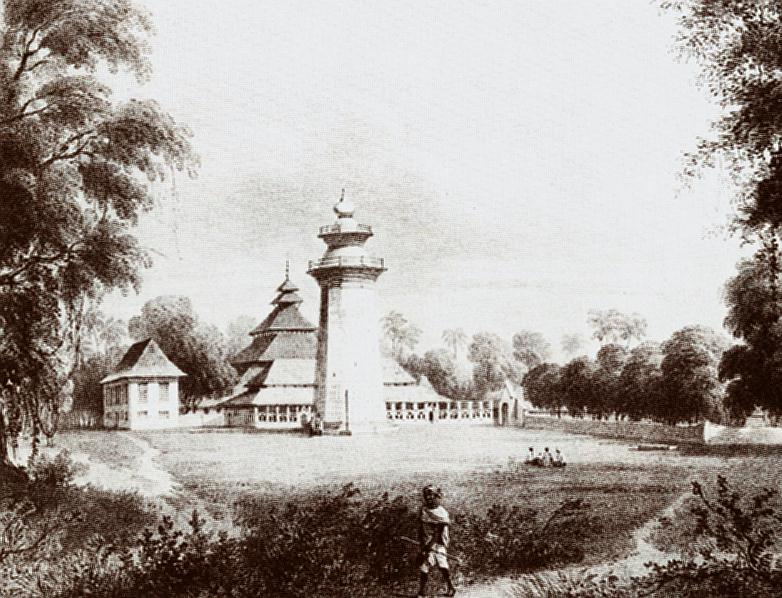
This sketch shows from right to left: the Mughal style minaret, the Javanese style mosque, and the Dutch style tiyamah.

The Great Mosque of Banten shows eclectic design, a proof of the international influence in Banten at the time of its construction in 1552. The mosque was constructed in Javanese style during the reign of Sultan Maulana Yusuf, the third Sultan of Banten Sultanate, in Dzulhijjah ah 966 (1566 CE).

A Javanese-styled pawestren (side hall, used for female's praying hall) was added during the reign of Maulana Muhammad (1580–1586). The southern serambi (porch) of the mosque was converted into a tomb containing about 15 graves.

In 1632, a 24-metre-tall (79 ft) minaret was added to the mosque complex. The minaret was designed by a Chineseman Cek-ban-cut. Around a similar period the Dutch-styled tiyamah was added to the mosque following the design of Hendrik Lucaasz Cardeel, a Dutchman who was converted to Islam.

The design elements of the Great Mosque of Banten have religious and cultural influences from Islam, Hinduism, Buddhism, the Chinese and the Dutch. These cultures have imposed their values and styles on the architecture of the Great Mosque of Banten, but have also blended well with the Javanese culture of Indonesia. For example, there is a blend of Hindu and Javanese architectural elements that consist of Dutch brick construction. Cardeel incorporated early European Baroque architectural features in his design of the mosque, which can mainly be seen in the minaret, tiyamah building, and mosque wall. This has set the Great Mosque of Banten apart from other traditional mosques in Indonesia, as there is a medley of different cultures embedded in its architectural design and elements.

== Architecture ==
The roof of the mosque has the traditional pyramidal roof style of the typical Javanese mosque.

=== Layout ===
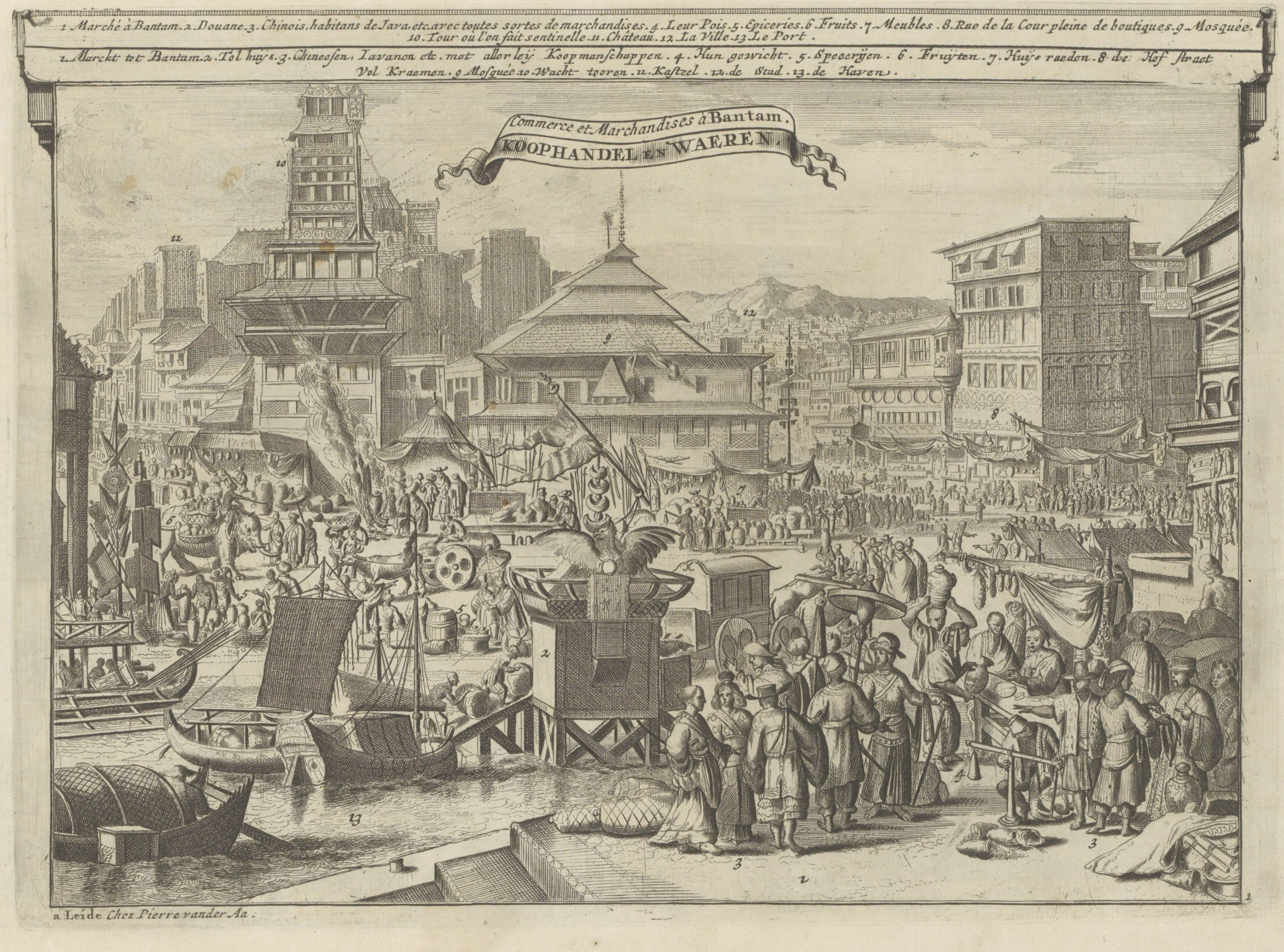
View of the mosque from the market, ca. 1682–1733.

Being a port town, the Great Mosque of Banten features eclectic elements, which appear in the overall enclosed space of the mosque, the minaret, and the tiyamah building. The minaret is a popular icon of the Great Mosque of Banten. It is a 24-metre-tall (79 ft) brick minaret, with a 10 m (33 ft) diameter octagonal base. The shape is reminiscent of a lighthouse. The architecture features a mix of Indian Mughal pattern and ancient candi decoration.

Beside the mosque is a two-floored building built in the 17th-century Dutch style. This building, known as the tiyamah, was erected at the order of Sultan Haji of Banten and designed by a Dutchman, Hendrik Lucaasz Cardeel. Cardeel converted to Islam, became a member of the Banten court with the title Pangeran Wiraguna, and designed this building which now stands on the southwest side of the Great Mosque. It is still used as a center for Islamic study. The tiyamah building is where social gatherings are held, and it is the only traditional mosque in Indonesia that has such building next to it. The tiyamah building was built to accommodate the tropical climate of Indonesia, which is seen through the open-floor plan with maximum ventilation and lighting and through features that protect the building such as a roof with acute angles to handle heavy rain. Construction materials included wood, bricks, and tiles. Windows and doors have a symmetrical design of horizontal and vertical lines.

Also included in the Great Mosque of Banten is a women's prayer room, called a pewastren, and several tombs in the mosque complex, such as the tomb of Sultan Maulana Hasanuddin and his wife, Sultan Ageng Tirtayasa, and that of Sultan Abu Nasir Abdul Qohhar. Because these were included in the layout of the mosque, the mosque's 24 columns were not located in the centre of the room, like they traditionally are. Unlike most of the traditional mosques that have a square base, the Great Mosque of Banten is built in a rectangular base. This is primarily because of the inclusion of the pewastren and the tombs.

==== Exterior ====
In a typical architecture of Javanese mosque, the Great Mosque of Banten consists of the main prayer hall and a covered veranda (serambi). The serambi is a semi-attached porch-like structure which provides entrance to the main prayer hall. The main prayer features a five-tiered roof supported by four main posts (saka guru). The three uppermost tier is arranged rather uniquely, appearing more like a Chinese pagoda than the regular multi-tiered roof of Javanese architecture. There is a dispute over the original number of the tiers of the main prayer hall; sketches of the city in 1596, 1624, 1661 and 1726 shows the number of the tier as not more than three tiers, while Valentijn (1858) mentioned the number of the tier is five as it is today. The covered verandas were added to the main mosque building, built in the north and south side of the mosque.

==== Interior ====
The interior of the Great Mosque of Banten is not very decorative or intricate as there is no calligraphy or ornamental art forms. The only decorative elements can be found in the air ventilation openings, where there are geometrical patterns. This minimalist style of interior design is similar to that of the Pecinan Tinggi Mosque, a mosque for the Chinese community of Indonesia.

There is large Buddhist influence in the column stumps of the mosque. The circular shape and form of the detailed lotus motif at the top and bottom of each column comes from a Chinese cultural approach, which has Buddhist influence. This round circular shape brings balance to the mosque, as it represents balance of all forces and strength. Additionally, it has been found that this detailed lotus motif is compatible with the Buddhist mediation layers, known as the sixty levels. This compatibility is seen through the columns being the focal point of prayers that occur in the mosque, their energy traveling up the columns to the highest point of the mosque.

== Sociocultural activities in the Mosque Complex ==
There are three main areas of the Great Mosque of Banten complex: the Great Mosque, the tiyamah building, and the cemetery area. The tiyamah building served as a space for social gatherings while the cemetery remained a cultural tradition that housed the graves of royalty. The cemetery had the most influence on the social and cultural activities that occur within the Mosque complex. Many visitors of the Great Mosque complex were there with the intention of visiting the tombs and graves of Sultan Maulana Hasanuddin and his family members. This influenced the type of traditional activities that were carried out in the area.

The Great Mosque of Banten was initially built to function as a location for Muslims to fulfill their religious needs and perform religious activities. Concurring with the needs for more to learn about Islam, Indonesia also had a rising Muslim-convert population. The variety and coexistence of architectural forms that reference cultural exchanges with other religious including Buddhism and Hinduism seen in the Great Mosque of Banten are meant to symbolize this convergence.

== See also ==
- List of mosques in Indonesia

== Works cited ==
- "Banten abounds in arceological treasures". the Jakarta Post - Life. Jakarta. July 10, 1999.
- Branti (July 15, 2015). "Keistimewaan Masjid Agung Banten" [The uniqueness of Banten Great Mosque]. Kebudayaan Indonesia (in Indonesian). Direktorat Jenderal Kebudayaan Republik Indonesia.
- Jo Santoso (1998). Gunawan Tjahjono (ed.). Cities of the Pesisir. Indonesian Heritage. Vol. 9. Singapore: Archipelago Press. ISBN 9813018585.
- Miksic, John (1998). Gunawan Tjahjono (ed.). Architecture of the Early Islamic Period. Indonesian Heritage. Vol. 9. Singapore: Archipelago Press. ISBN 9813018585.
- Zein, Abdul Baqir (1999). Masjid-masjid bersejarah di Indonesia [Historic mosques in Indonesia] (in Indonesian). Jakarta: Gema Insani. ISBN 9789795615675.
