= Old Banten =

- Banten Lama (Indonesian)
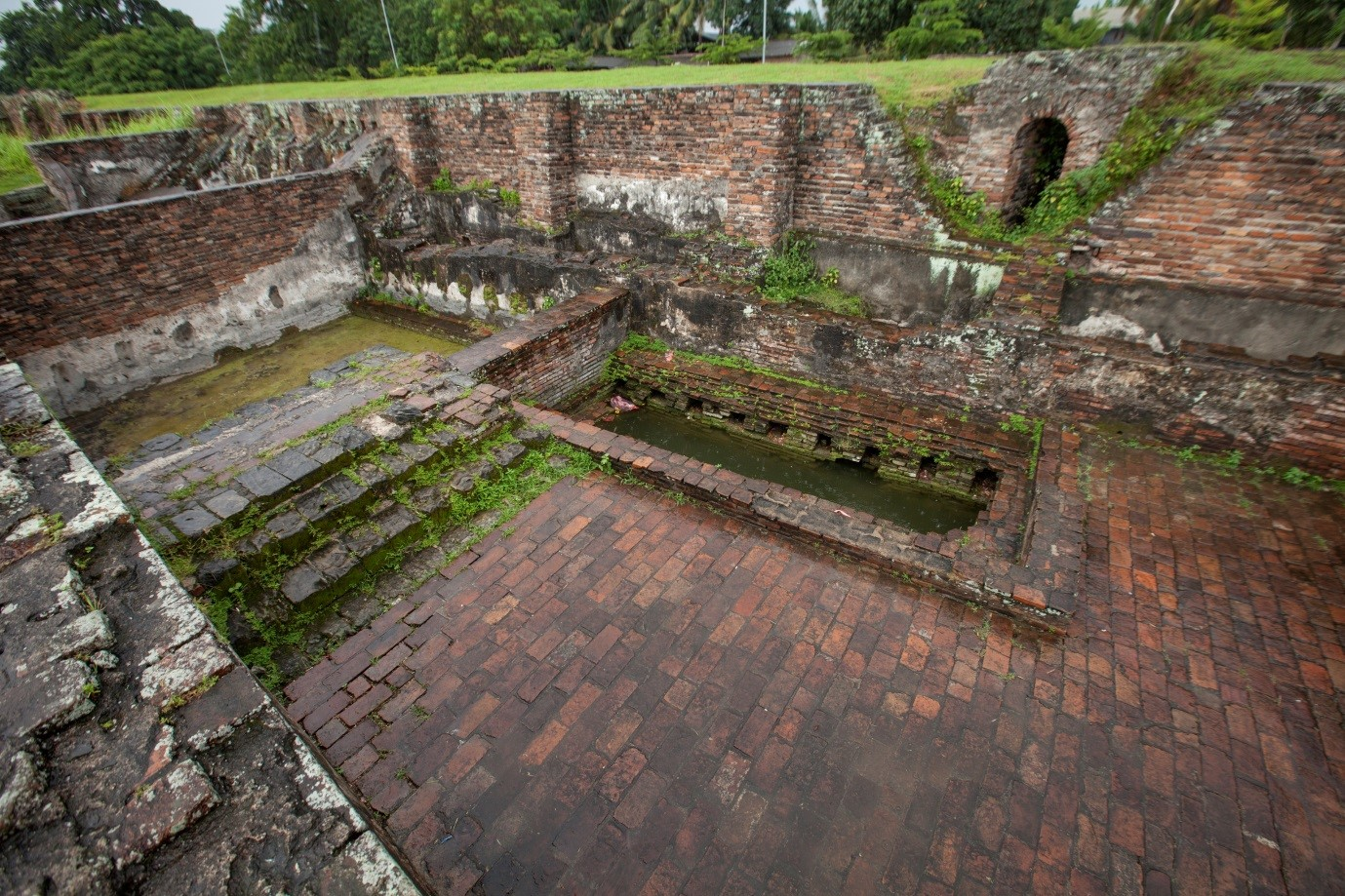
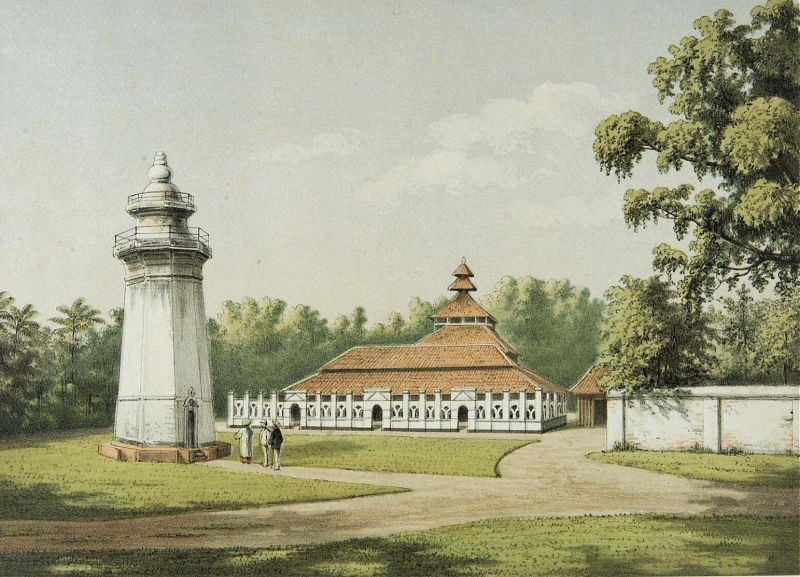
- Kraton Surosowan and Old Mosque of Banten

- Location within Indonesia
- 6°02′33″S 106°09′39″E
- Type: Settlement, Port city
- Location: Banten, West Java
- Nearest city: Cilegon

History
- Founded: 16th century
- Founder: Maulana Hasanuddin

Site notes
- Architectural styles: Javanese-Islamic, Dutch architecture

Old Banten (Indonesian Banten Lama) is an archaeological site in the northern coast of Serang Regency, Banten, Indonesia. Located 11 km north of Serang city, the site of Old Banten contains the ruin of the walled port city of Banten, the 16th-century capital of the Sultanate of Banten.

Since 1995, Old Banten has been proposed to UNESCO World Heritage.

== History ==
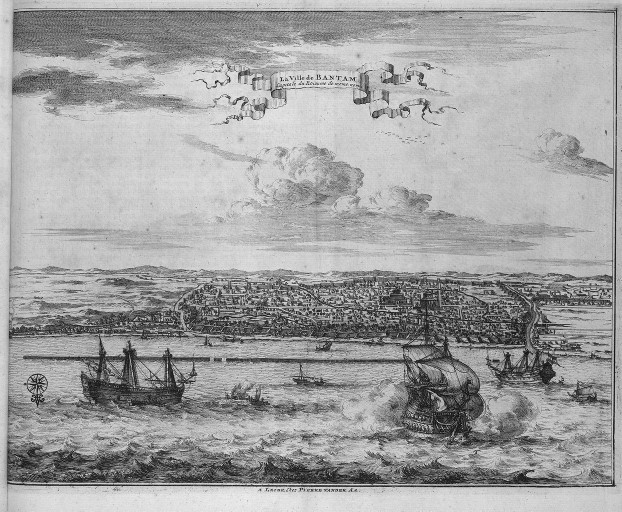
Banten in the 16th century corresponds to the archaeological site of Old Banten.

Banten was a 16th-century port city known for its pepper. The city flourished when the Islamic Banten Sultanate reached its peak during the 17th century. There was a period of intense conflicts with the Dutch East India Company (VOC) over the trade of spices, which eventually led to the dissolution of the Sultanate in Banten and to the city's decline.

Today, the site where the city of Banten remains is known as Old Banten. It is a well-known tourist attraction, where many locals visit to pay their respects and pray at the graves of Sultan Maulana Hasanuddin and his descendants; or visits the Great Mosque. The area reflects the sultanate's earlier glory. Notable buildings include the impressive Great Mosque of Banten, ruins of two important Kraton (palaces), the watch tower, the water systems and the artifacts at the Museum of Banten Artifacts.

== Archeological sites ==
The city of Banten was laid out in accordance with precepts imported from Java rather than mirroring local Sundanese ideas. In 1596, the city housed roughly 100,000 people. It was a walled city. Transport within the city was mainly by water: rivers, canals, and bridges. Artificial reservoir and drainage system provides clean water for the city from the southern region of the city via aqueducts and underground pipes. The area within the wall was divided into a northern and a southern half. Only Indonesians were allowed to live within the city wall; foreigners were located outside, with foreign Muslims on the northeast, foreign non-Muslims on the west, both along the shore.

The northern section contained the remains of the residential compounds of the elite. There is a mosque facing a Javanese alun-alun, a typical layout of Javanese city. The compound of the shahbandar or the harbor master was located on the eastern side of the alun-alun. the Kraton of Surosowan, as well as the Great Mosque of Banten, is located in this area. Banten population was engaged in common craft such as pottery making, many of these are found and kept in a site museum.

The city now has been reduced to a mere village, with squatters filling empty space in between archaeological area. Despite encouraged tourism, especially for the Great Mosque of Banten, the rest of the site received lack of proper conservation.

=== Kraton of Surosowan ===
The Surosowan Kraton is a ruined palace where the Sultans of Banten resided. The palace was built in 1552. Unlike the Kaibon Kraton, there is little left inside the kraton. The only visible remains of the kraton is the half to two meter wall — of red stone and coral stone — surrounding the perimeter of the kraton complex. The layout of former buildings are visible from the foundation's layout. One of the visible remains is a rectangular pool, assumed to be the pleasure pool where the princess of Banten took a bath, not different from the pleasure pool of Yogyakarta Kraton. The fort was destroyed by the Dutch during a conflict with Sultan Ageng Tirtayasa in 1680.

There was a plan for reconstruction of the compounds within Kraton Surosowan in early 2013, however it is not clear how to finance the reconstruction process.

=== The mosques ===
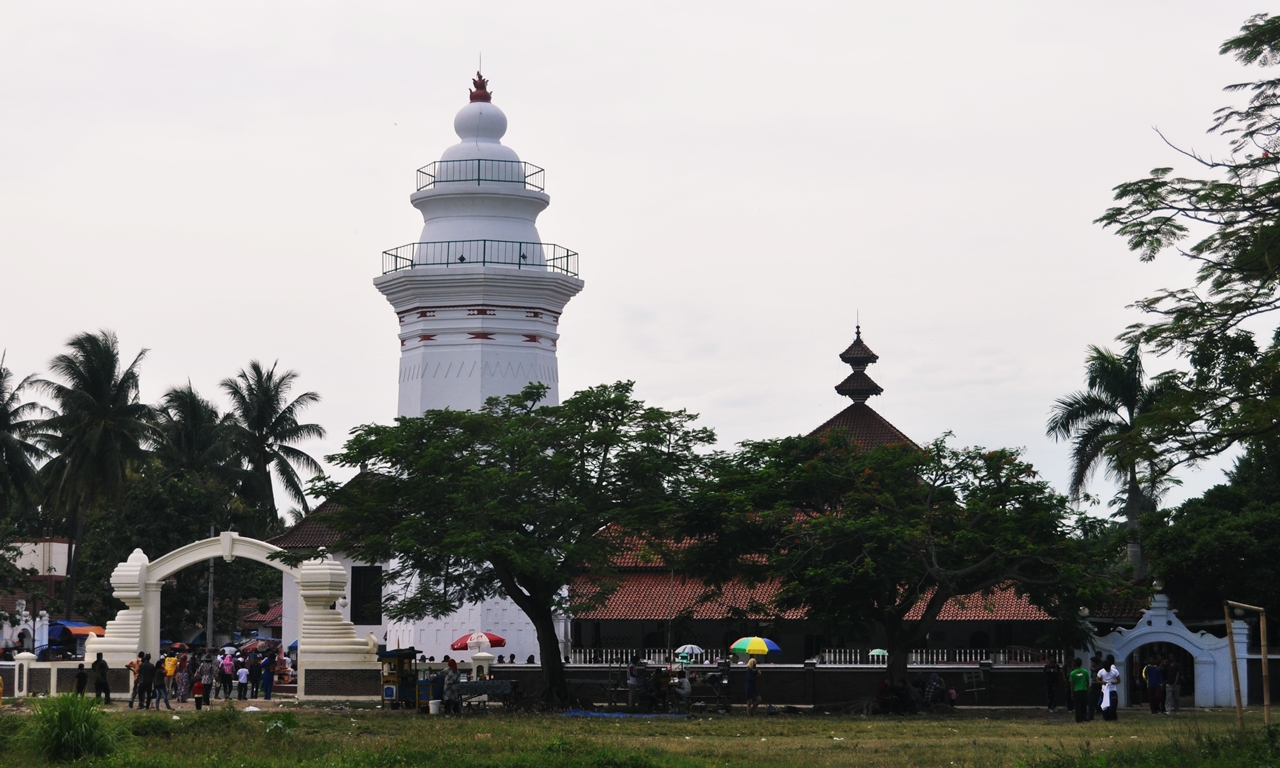
The 16th-century Great Mosque of Banten.

There are several mosques inside and outside the walled city of Old Banten. The largest mosque, and the only surviving building within the Old Banten walled city, is the Great Mosque of Banten. Well-maintained by its followers, the Great Mosque complex contains several buildings which shows a mixture of architectural style. The mosque shows a mixture of local Javanese and Chinese influence, the lighthouse-shaped minaret shows Portuguese influence, the tiyamah building (where Islamic studies are conducted), which was built by a Dutchman who converted into Islam, features a typical Dutch colonial style with its high sash window.

Other remains of mosques around Old Banten are the Masjid Kanari, a tower of the ruined Masjid Pecinan Tinggi, the already demolished mosque of the Kraton Kaibon, and ruins of Koja Mosque.

=== Kraton of Kaibon ===
The Kaibon Kraton is the ruined palace and residence of Ratu Aisyah, the queen and mother of Sultan Syaifuddin. The Kraton was destroyed in 1832 following the order of Daendels, partly because unlike other Sultanates in Indonesia, the Sultanate of Banten never bowed to the colonial government. Several buildings are still visible.

=== Avalokiteshvara Vihara ===
The Chinese temple is one of the oldest in Indonesia. The existence of this vihara in Old Banten means that the Buddhist religion was tolerated in the overall Muslim city of Banten.

=== Fort Speelwijk ===
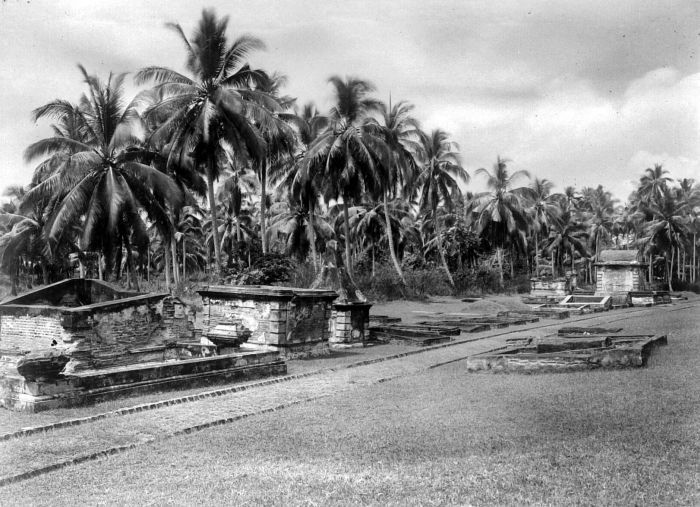
European cemetery near Fort Speelwijk

Not far from the Great Mosque of Banten is a Dutch fort built in 1682. The fort is square shaped. There is a European cemetery to the southeast of the fort.

=== Museum of Old Banten ===
The Museum of Old Banten (Indonesian "Museum Situs Kepurbakalaan Banten Lama") is a museum located between Surosowan Kraton and the Great Mosque. The museum kept archaeological remnants such as ceramic vases, roof, and coins related with the historic port city of Banten. Other important artifacts are Meriam Ki Amuk (a 2.5 meter long Ottoman cannon) and a stone pepper mill.

=== Vicinity of Old Banten ===
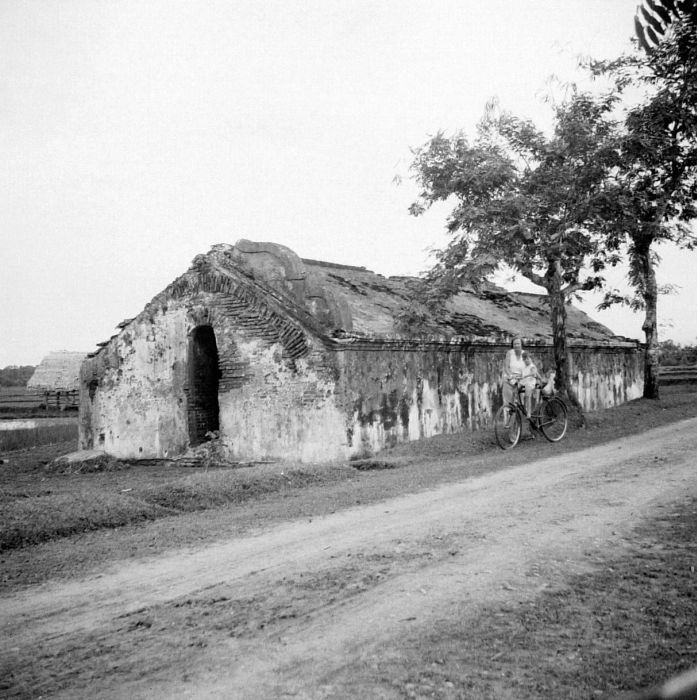
Remains of a water treatment station south of Old Banten. Three of these water reservoirs can still be seen today.

There are remnants of infrastructures outside the walled city of Banten. Tasik Ardi (Ardi Lake) is a rectangular 5 hectare artificial lake formerly used as a water reservoir for the city of Banten. From this reservoir, water are channeled via pipes and viaducts to the city, passing a series of water treatment stations. Some of these water treatment stations are still visible today.

The village of Kasunyatan, several meter south of Old Banten, was once an Islamic learning center for the Sultan of Banten. There are several tombs and 16th-century Kasunyatan Mosque in the village.

== See also ==
- Bantam

== Works cited ==
- Fidrus, Multa (April 20, 2013a). "Historic Grand Mosque to get new look". the Jakarta Post. Jakarta. Archived from the original on November 21, 2015.
- Fidrus, Mufta (May 15, 2013b). "Banten called to revive Sultanate legacy". the Jakarta Post - Tangerang. Tangerang. Archived from the original on November 21, 2015.
- Jo Santoso (1998). Gunawan Tjahjono (ed.). Cities of the Pesisir. Indonesian Heritage. Vol. 9. Singapore: Archipelago Press. ISBN 9813018585.
- Nasution, Isman Pratama (1994). "Mesjid Kasunyatan" [Kasunyatan Mosque] (PDF) (in Indonesian). Depok: FIB UI. Archived from the original (PDF) on November 14, 2015.
- "Banten abounds in archeological treasures". the Jakarta Post - Life. Jakarta. July 10, 1999. Archived from the original on November 21, 2015.
