= Serang =

Capital city of Banten, Indonesia

- City
- City of Serang; Kota Serang

Name transcription(s)
  - Javanese: ꦏꦶꦛꦱꦺꦫꦁ
  - Sundanese: ᮓᮚᮩᮂ ᮞᮦᮛᮀ
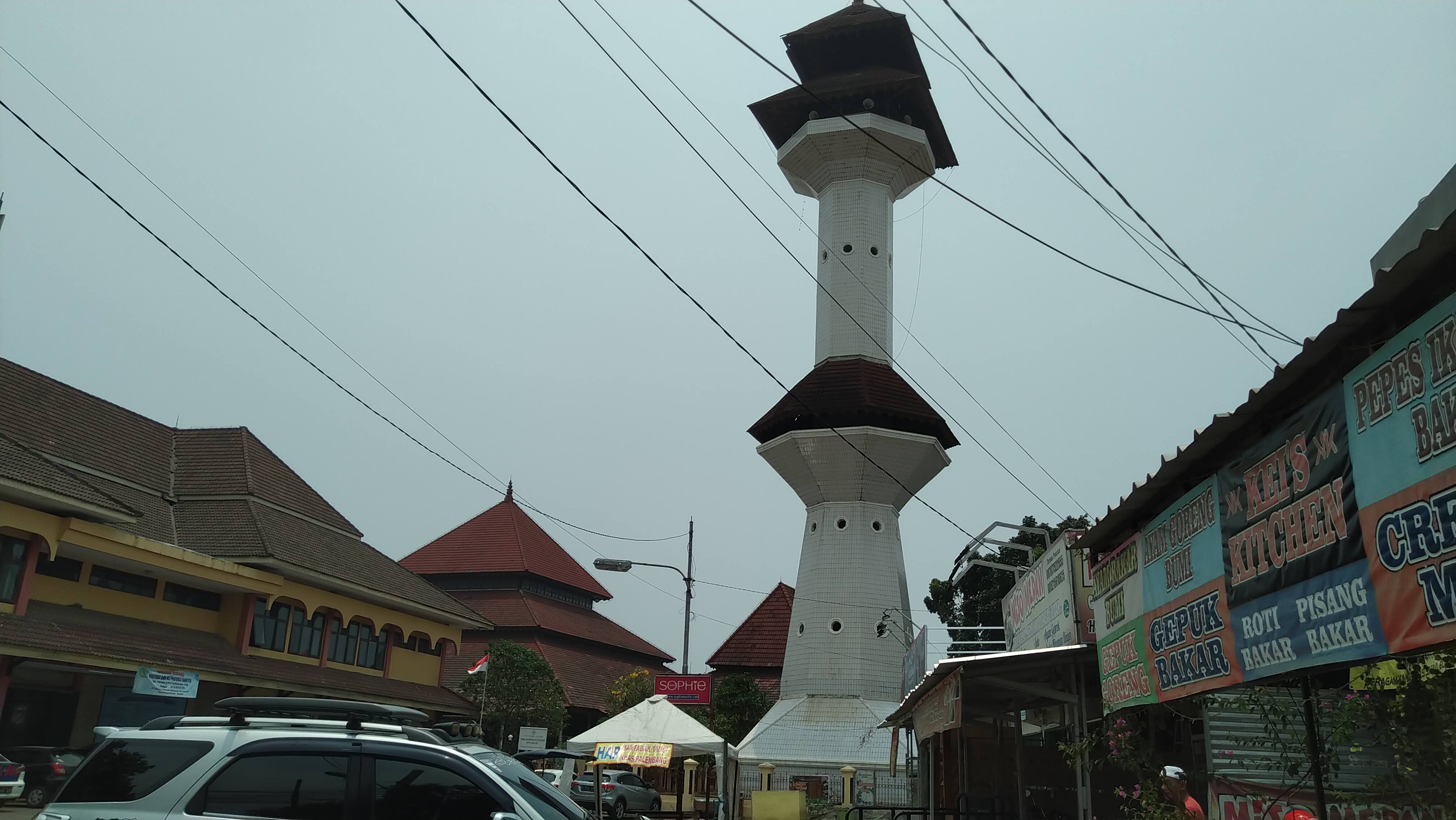
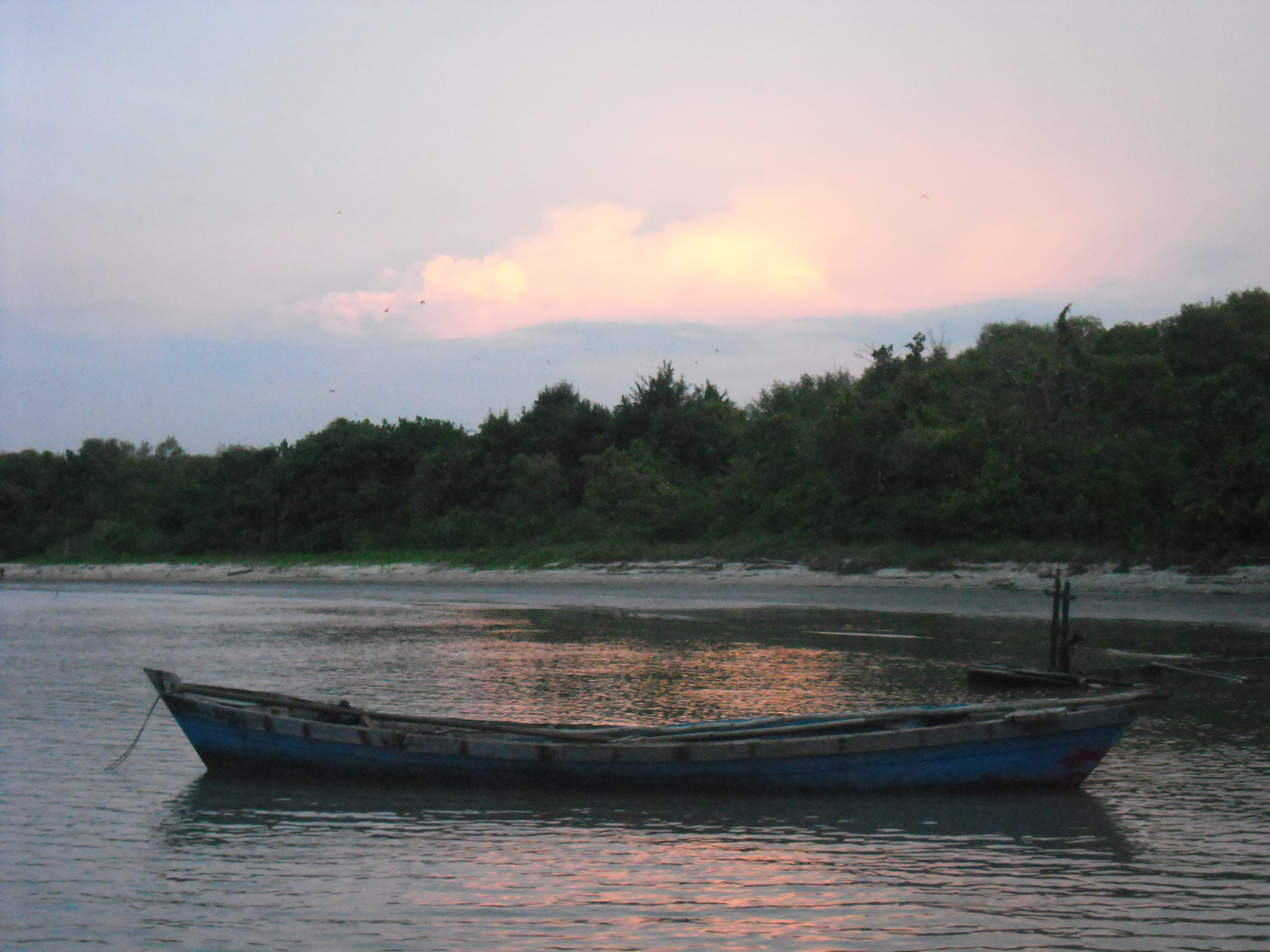
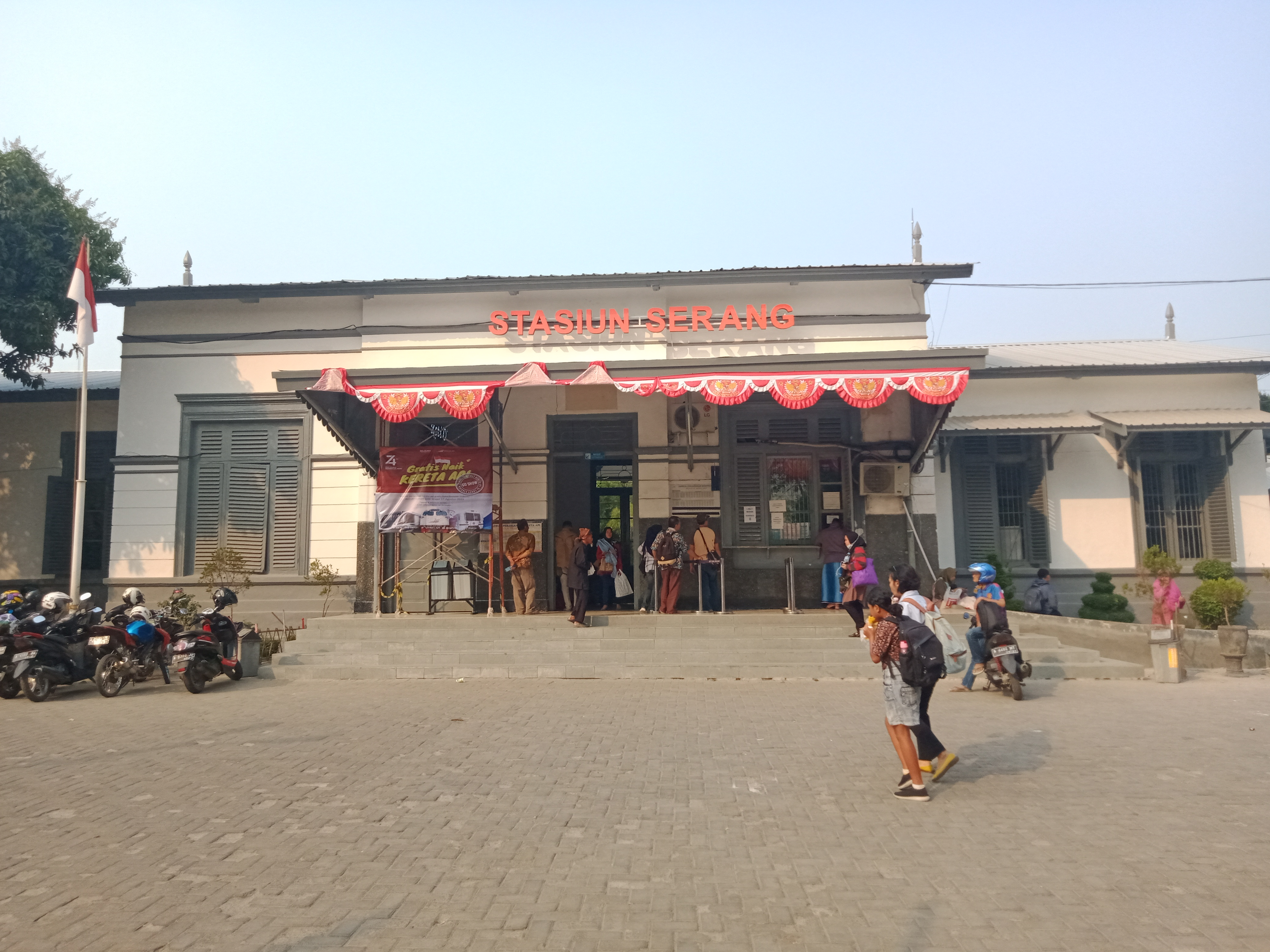
- Ats-Tsauroh Great Mosque of Serang Pulau Dua Nature Reserve Serang railway station

- Flag Seal
- Nickname(s): Kota Sawah "City of Paddy Fields"
- Motto: Kota Serang Madani "The self-reliant City of Serang"
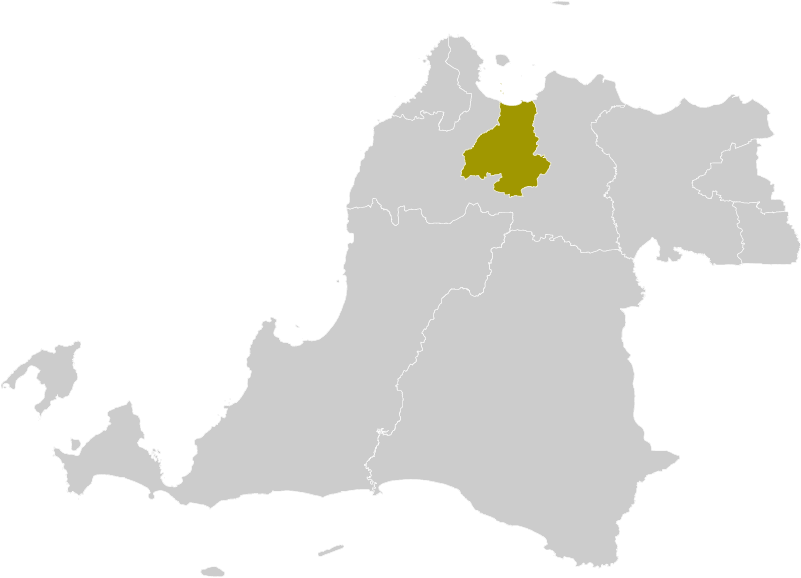
- Location within Banten

- Location in Java Location in Indonesia
- Coordinates: 6°7′12″S 106°9′1″E
- Country: Indonesia
- Province: Banten
- Established: 2 November 2007

Government
  - Type: Mayor–council
  - Body: Serang City Government
  - Mayor: Budi Rustandi (Gerindra)
  - Vice Mayor: Nur Agis Aulia
  - Legislature: Serang City Regional House of Representatives (DPRD)

Area
  - City: 263.16 km^{2} (101.61 sq mi)
- Elevation: 17 m (56 ft)

Population (2026 estimate)
  - City: 756,141
  - Rank: 24th in Indonesia
  - Density: 2,873.3/km^{2} (7,441.8/sq mi)
  - Urban: 1,250,000
  - Metro: 2,908,510 (Part of Jakarta Combined Area)
- Time zone: UTC+7 (Indonesia Western Time)
- Area code: (+62) 254
- Registration plate: A
- Website: serangkota.go.id

Serang (Indonesian: Kota Serang, Indonesian pronunciation: ['seraŋ], Javanese: ꦱꦺꦫꦁ; Sundanese: ᮞᮦᮛᮀ) is a city and the capital of Banten province and was formerly also the administrative center of Serang Regency in Indonesia (the Regency's capital is now at Ciruas). The city is located towards the north of Banten province, on the island of Java; the north part of the city (Kasemen District) contains the coast zone facing onto Banten Bay, and includes the historical site of Old Banten, after which the province is named. Before Banten province was formed in 2000, Serang city was part of West Java province.

Serang has a tropical rainforest climate, with no dry season month. It faces the Java Sea, which is home to the Thousand Islands.

Serang had a population of 576,961 in the 2010 census, making it the third most populous city in the province of Banten. The 2020 Census gave a total of 692,101; the official estimate as of mid-2023 was 735,651. Serang is located approximately 15 km from the border of Jabodetabek (the Jakarta Metropolitan Area), and is sometimes considered as amalgamated with Greater Jakarta.

== Culture ==
=== Religion ===
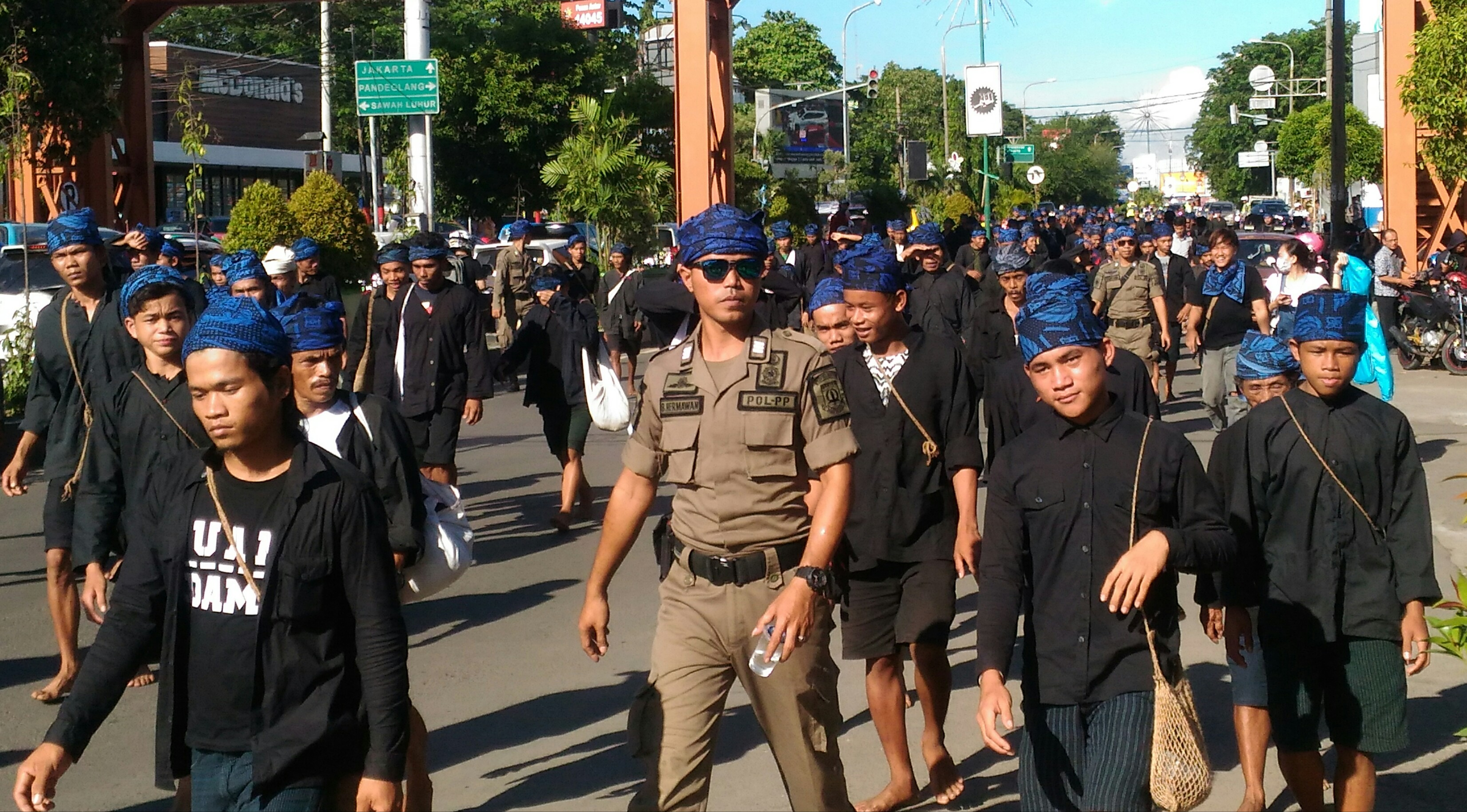
Seba Baduy festival of the indigenous Baduy people.

The majority of people in Serang and Banten Province embrace Islam, but other religions coexist peacefully. Serang is often known as "kota santri" or the "city of pious people", due to the history as a traditional center of Islamic learning. The city hosts two of the major congregational mosques in Banten province, Ats-Tsauroh Great Mosque of Serang and Al-Bantani Grand Mosque, which hold the capacity of 2,500 and 10,000 worshippers respectively.

=== Language ===
Compared with the majority in Banten Province who speak the Sundanese language, some local residents in Serang also speak the Javanese language with a dialect similar to the Cirebon dialect of Javanese. The reason for this is that many Javanese migrants arrived in early 1527 to build the Banten Sultanate, and remained to form the base of today's population.

== Transportation ==
The city is served by Serang station, operated by Indonesia's rail operator PT Kereta Api Indonesia.

The Tangerang–Merak Toll Road, part of the Trans-Java toll road, passes through the city of Serang.

The road to the proposed Sunda Strait Bridge would start in Serang, pass through Merak in neighboring Cilegon city to cross over the Sunda Strait to Sumatra.

The nearest airport is Soekarno-Hatta International Airport in nearby Jakarta which is located approximately 29 km from the city centre.

== Administrative districts ==
Serang was formerly a part of Serang Regency. On 2 November 2007, the status of Serang was changed into a municipality (kota madya), independent of the Regency. Since that time, Serang City is a semi-enclave within Serang Regency, as the city borders the regency in the south, east, and west, while it borders with Java Sea in the north.

The City of Serang is divided into six districts (kecamatan), tabulated below with their areas and their populations at the 2010 Census and the 2020 Census, together with the official estimates as of mid-2023. The table also includes the number of administrative villages (all classed as urban kelurahan) in each district, and its postal codes.

Kode Wilayah	Name of District (kecamatan)	Area in km^{2}	Pop'n Census 2010	Pop'n Census 2020	Pop'n Estimate mid 2023	No. of villages	Post codes
36.73.04	Curug	49.60	47,308	57,346	63,299	10	47171
36.73.03	Walantaka	41.80	75,672	102,543	109,398	14	47183
36.73.05	Cipocok Jaya	31.54	80,930	98,907	105,853	8	47121 - 47128
36.73.01	Serang (district)	25.88	208,017	226,196	234,993	12	47111 - 47119
36.73.06	Taktakan	57.98	78,184	100,296	108,129	13	47162
36.73.02	Kasemen	56.36	87,674	106,813	113,979	10	47191
	Totals	263.16	577,785	692,101	735,651	67	

== Climate ==
Serang has a tropical rainforest climate (Köppen: Af) with heavy rainfall year-round. Rain gets noticeably heavier from December to March.

Climate data for Serang
Month	Jan	Feb	Mar	Apr	May	Jun	Jul	Aug	Sep	Oct	Nov	Dec	Year
Mean daily maximum °C (°F)	30.4 (86.7)	30.9 (87.6)	31.4 (88.5)	32.0 (89.6)	32.3 (90.1)	32.2 (90.0)	32.3 (90.1)	32.3 (90.1)	32.8 (91.0)	32.8 (91.0)	32.4 (90.3)	31.7 (89.1)	32.0 (89.5)
Daily mean °C (°F)	26.4 (79.5)	26.9 (80.4)	27.5 (81.5)	27.9 (82.2)	27.5 (81.5)	27.1 (80.8)	27.1 (80.8)	27.2 (81.0)	27.3 (81.1)	27.9 (82.2)	27.9 (82.2)	27.2 (81.0)	27.3 (81.2)
Mean daily minimum °C (°F)	22.5 (72.5)	22.6 (72.7)	22.5 (72.5)	22.7 (72.9)	22.8 (73.0)	22.1 (71.8)	21.6 (70.9)	21.4 (70.5)	21.8 (71.2)	22.3 (72.1)	22.7 (72.9)	22.8 (73.0)	22.3 (72.2)
Average precipitation mm (inches)	305 (12.0)	257 (10.1)	197 (7.8)	154 (6.1)	132 (5.2)	85 (3.3)	86 (3.4)	82 (3.2)	82 (3.2)	119 (4.7)	162 (6.4)	217 (8.5)	1,878 (73.9)

== Emblem ==
The emblem of Serang consists of

- A hexagon with an image of the gerbang Kaibon and a star.
- The streamer at the foot of the emblem contains the motto of Serang city, Kota Serang Madani ("Self-reliant Serang").

== Notable people ==
- Arif Cahyono (born 1975) - army general
