= Purwakarta-Bandung–Cileunyi Toll Road =

Toll Road in West Java, Indonesia

Purwakarta–Cileunyi Toll Road
- Purbaleunyi Toll Road
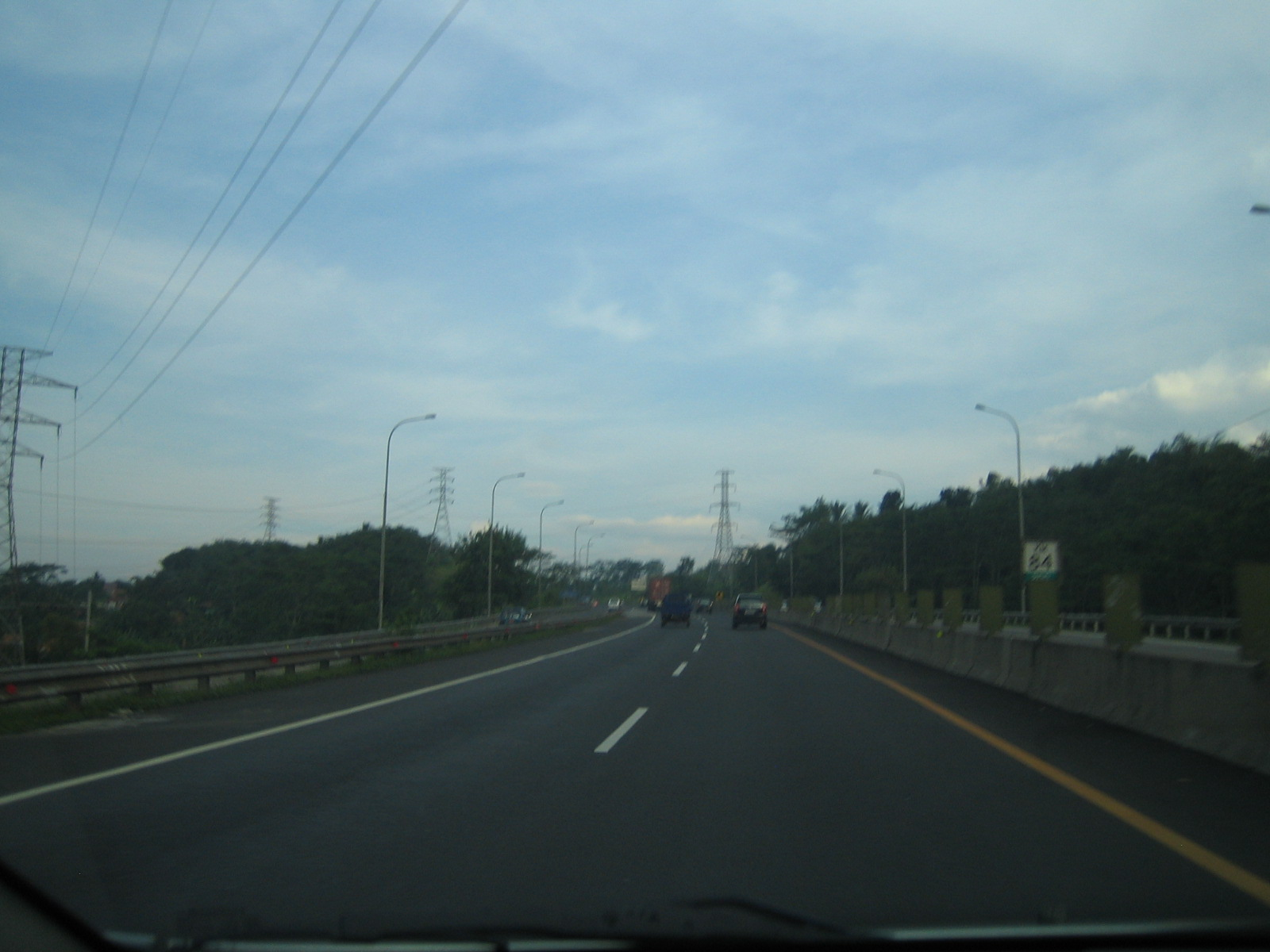
- Purbaleunyi Toll Road in KM 84 at Jatiluhur exit heading southeastbound in 2010

Route information
- Part of AH2
- Maintained by PT Jasa Marga Tbk
- Length: 89 km (55 mi)
- Existed: 1989–present
- History: Built in 1989–1992 (km 122–155) and 2003–2005 (km 67–122)

Major junctions
- North end: Kalihurip Interchange
- AH2 – Jakarta–Cikampek Toll Road; Jakarta-Cikampek II South Toll Road (under construction); Soreang–Pasir Koja Toll Road; Cisumdawu Toll Road
- South end: Cileunyi Interchange

Location
- Country: Indonesia
- Provinces: West Java
- Major cities: Purwakarta Regency; West Bandung Regency; Cimahi; Bandung; Bandung Regency

Highway system
- Transport in Indonesia

Purwakarta–Bandung–Cileunyi Toll Road or shortened as Purbaleunyi Toll Road is a controlled-access toll road in Indonesia, connecting Purwakarta Regency, West Bandung, Cimahi and the city and regency of Bandung.

Before fully connected, this toll road segment was Padalarang–Cileunyi only. From 2003 until 2005, the segment of Cikampek–Padalarang was constructed. Since then, this toll road is part of Jakarta–Cikampek Toll Road. The junction of both toll roads is located at kilometer 67. This toll road is famous for its scenic views, as well as notoriously known for its accidents on the Cipularang Segment.

== Sections ==
=== Kilometres 67–122 ===
The Purbaleunyi toll road starts from kilometre 67. This section is known as Cipularang. It has a length of 58 kilometres (36 mi). It connects Purwakarta Regency and West Bandung. This segment runs to a hill without any electricity, thus solar street lights have been installed. This section is notoriously known for its accidents, especially around kilometres 92–97. This section ends at Padalarang.

For technical aspects, Cipularang Toll Road has 2 lanes in each direction (with some little segments having a climbing lane for heavy vehicles). Unfortunately, this toll road may sometimes be closed for heavy vehicles traffic due to the difficult terrain to repair its condition. The famous event for this closure is Cisomang Bridge pillars break.

On 18 December 2022, Darangdan Toll Gate has been opened functionally as an access to Purwakarta Regency and West Bandung Regency. The toll gate was planned to be opened until 8 January 2022, and has remained operating since.

This toll road holds the record of longest exit-to-exit spans in Indonesia with Padalarang to Jatiluhur spans for 38 km without any other exits (for southbound) before being surpassed by Pematang Panggang–Kayuagung Toll Road in Sumatra, where the spans between Pematang Panggang and Kayuagung spans 91 km (KM239-KM330) without any exits between them.

=== Kilometres 122–155 ===
This section is known as Padaleunyi. It has length of 33 kilometres (21 mi) for mainline and a grand total of 7.7 kilometres (4.8 mi) for Bandung City Main Links (5 kilometres (3.1 mi) in Pasteur Link and 2.7 kilometres (1.7 mi) in Pasir Koja link). It crosses South Bandung, also acts as the third southern ring roads of Bandung Metropolitan Areas; the second ring road is Soekarno-Hatta Street, Bandung, while the first ring road consists of many city roads. It ends at Cileunyi, although there's an extension project to go to Sumedang and Kertajati International Airport via Cisumdawu Toll Road. For the future, this toll road will be used a main line for Southern Java toll roads network through Gedebage–Tasikmalaya–Cilacap Toll Road.

Famous destinations on this segment are:

- Bandung
- Dago
- Dayeuhkolot
- Cibaduyut Shoe Market
- Mount Tangkuban Perahu
- Lembang
- Soreang
- Ciwidey

From KM125 to KM150, Jakarta-Bandung High Speed Railway parallels this toll road.

== Facilities ==
=== Rest areas ===
Note that the toll road goes east–west from KM122-KM155, while from KM67-KM122, the direction is suggested south–north.

KM	Direction	Toilet	Mosque	Restaurant	Convenience Store	ATM	Gas Station	Rest Area
72	Northbound	check	check	check	check	check	check	check
72	Southbound	check	check	check	check	check	check	check
88	Northbound	check	check	check	check	check	check	check
88	Southbound	check	check	check	check	check	check	check
97	Northbound	check	check	check	check	check	check	check
125	Westbound	check	check	check	check	check	check	check
147	Eastbound	check	check	check	check	check	check	check
149	Westbound	check	check	check	check	check	check	check

== Toll gate ==
=== Cipularang Toll Road ===
Province	Location	km	mi	Exit	Name	Destinations	Notes
West Java	Cikampek, Karawang Regency	0	0.0	67; (0)	Kalihurip Interchange	Jakarta–Cikampek Toll Road; Westbound; Karawang; Bekasi; Jakarta; Eastbound; Cikopo–Palimanan Toll Road; Cikampek; Subang; Cirebon	Northwest terminus
West Java	Cikampek, Karawang Regency	0.33	0.21	Kalihurip Utama Toll Gate			
West Java	Babakancikao, Purwakarta Regency	9.21	5.72	76; (9)	Sadang Interchange	Eastbound; Sadang; Purwakarta; Subang; Westbound; Jakarta–Cikampek South Toll Road (Under Construction)	
West Java	Jatiluhur, Purwakarta Regency	17.21	10.69	84; (17)	Jatiluhur Toll Gate	Jatiluhur; Purwakarta; Ciganea	
West Java	Darangdan, Purwakarta Regency	32.73	20.34	99; (32)	Darangdan Toll Gate	Darangdan; Cikalongwetan; West Bandung Regency	Southeast-bound only
West Java	Ngamprah, West Bandung Regency	49.76	30.92	116; (49)	Cikamuning Toll Gate	Cikamuning; Cikalongwetan; Purwakarta	North-bound only
West Java	Ngamprah, West Bandung Regency	54.87	34.09	121; (54)	Padalarang Timur Toll Gate	Padalarang; Cikalongwetan; Cianjur	
West Java	Ngamprah, West Bandung Regency	55.90	34.73	Padalarang–Cileunyi Toll Road			
West Java	1.000 mi = 1.609 km; 1.000 km = 0.621 mi: Electronic toll collection; Incomplete access; Route transition						

=== Padalarang–Cileunyi Toll Road ===
Province	Location	km	mi	Exit	Name	Destinations	Notes
West Java	Ngamprah, West Bandung Regency	55.90	34.73	Cipularang Toll Road			
West Java	South Cimahi, Cimahi	60.82	37.79	127; (60)	Pasteur Interchange	Pasteur Link; Cimahi; Bandung; Lembang	
West Java	Bandung Kulon, Bandung	65.7	40.8	132; (65)	Pasir Koja Interchange	Northbound; Pasir Koja; Leuwipanjang Terminal; Bandung; Southbound; Soreang–Pasir Koja Toll Road; Margaasih; Ciwidey	
West Java	Babakan Ciparay, Bandung	68.79	42.74	135; (68)	Kopo Toll Gate	Kopo; Margahayu; Soreang	
West Java	Bojongloa Kidul, Bandung	72.40	44.99	139; (72)	Moh. Toha Toll Gate	Muhammad Toha; Banjaran	
West Java	Bandung Kidul, Bandung	75.51	46.92	142; (75)	Buah Batu Toll Gate	Buah Batu; Dayeuhkolot	
West Java	Gedebage, Bandung	148.60	92.34	149; (82)	Gedebage Toll Gate	Gedebage; Tegalluar	
West Java	Cileunyi, Bandung Regency	89.18	55.41	155; (82)	Cileunyi Toll Gate	Cibiru; Cileunyi; Garut; Tasikmalaya	Southeast Terminus
West Java	Jatinangor, Sumedang Regency	89.71	55.74	Cisumdawu Toll Road			
1.000 mi = 1.609 km; 1.000 km = 0.621 mi: Electronic toll collection

==== Pasteur Link ====
Province	Location	km	mi	Exit	Name	Destinations	Notes
West Java	South Cimahi, Cimahi	0	0.0	127; (60)	Pasteur Interchange	Northbound; Padalarang; Cipularang Toll Road; Jakarta; Southbound; Soreang-Pasir Koja Toll Road; Kopo; Cileunyi	Western terminus
West Java	Central Cimahi, Cimahi	0.84	0.52	1	Baros Toll Gate	Baros; Cimahi; Leuwigajah	
West Java	Central Cimahi, Cimahi	1.17	0.73	Pasteur Toll Gate			
West Java	Cicendo, Bandung	5.19	3.22	5	Pasteur Toll Gate	Bandung; Lembang; Husein Sastranegara International Airport	Eastern terminus
1.000 mi = 1.609 km; 1.000 km = 0.621 mi: Electronic toll collection

== Bridges ==
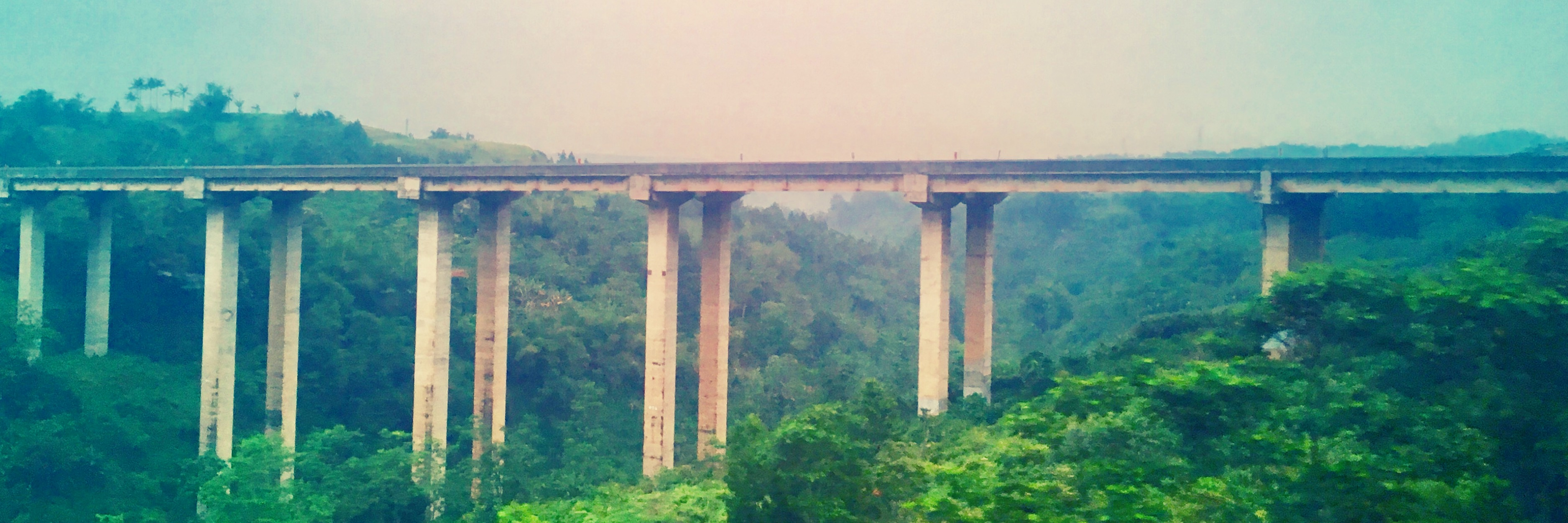
Cisomang Bridge in Km 101

KM	Name	Length
95	Ciujung	550 metres
101	Cisomang	252 metres
110	Cikubang	500 metres
110	Cipada	720 metres
117	Cimeta	400 metres

== See also ==
- Jakarta–Cikampek Toll Road
- Cisumdawu Toll Road
