= Padalarang–Cileunyi Toll Road =

Toll Road in Indonesia

Coordinates: 06°51′34.48″S 107°30′17.85″E

- Jalan Tol Padaleunyi
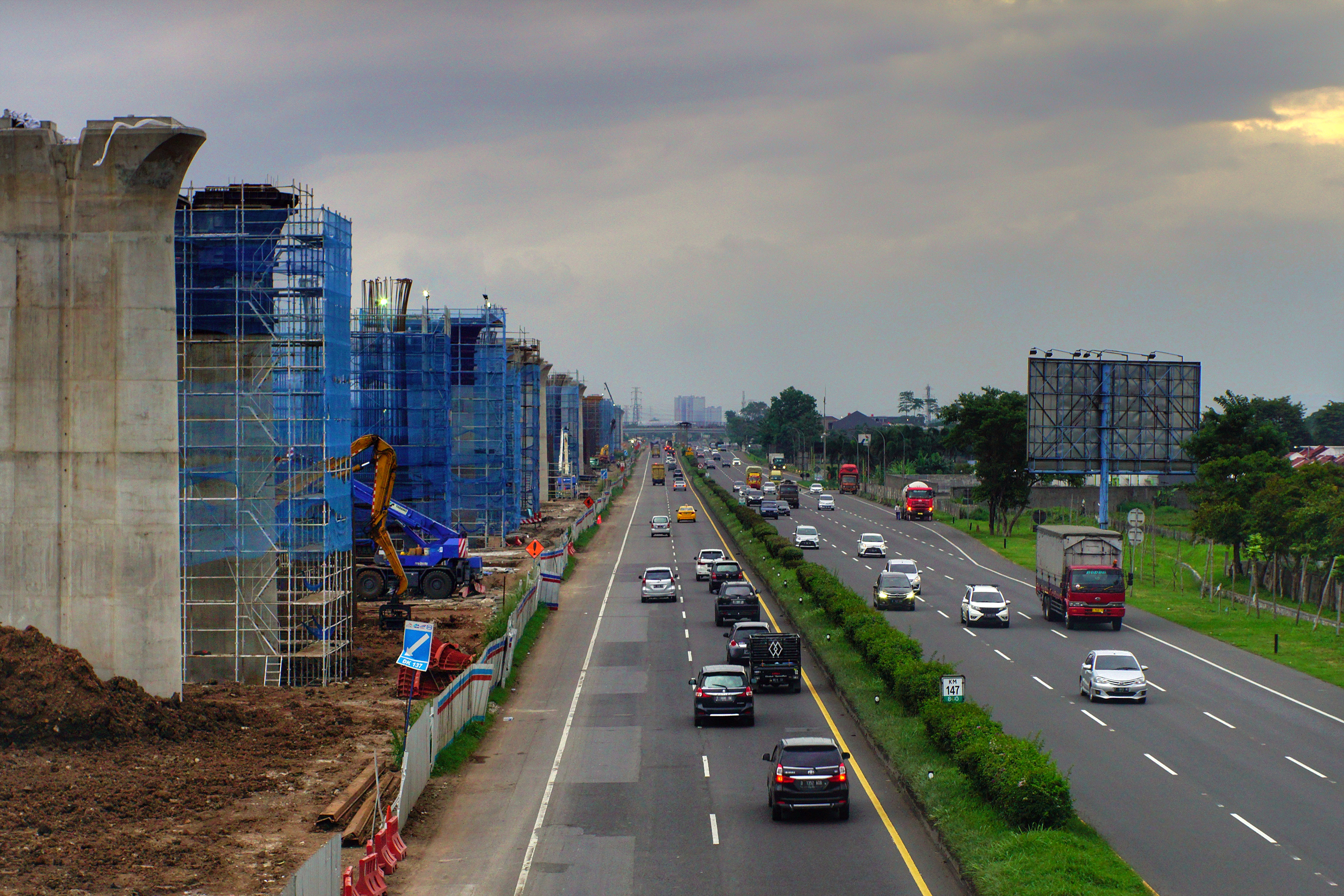
- Padalarang-Cileunyi Toll Road in 2020

Route information
- Part of AH2
- Maintained by PT Jasa Marga Tbk
- Length: 64.4 km (40.0 mi)
- Existed: 1991–present
- History: As a part of Cipularang Toll road. Also connects Padalarang-Bandung-Cileunyi

Major junctions
- West end: Padalarang Interchange
- Cipularang Toll Road; Soreang–Pasir Koja Toll Road; Cisumdawu Toll Road
- East end: Cileunyi Interchange

Location
- Country: Indonesia
- Major cities: West Bandung Regency; Cimahi; Bandung; Bandung Regency

Highway system
- Transport in Indonesia

Padalarang–Cileunyi Toll Road or Padaleunyi is a controlled-access toll road located in Bandung, West Java. It is a part of the Purbaleunyi Toll Road (Purwakarta-Bandung-Cileunyi) connecting Cileunyi, Bandung Regency with Purwakarta and onwards to Jakarta. This particular segment of the toll road bypasses the city of Bandung and is also used for local transportation between locations passed.

== Description ==
This toll road was constructed between 1989 and 1992. It is amongst the oldest toll road constructed in Indonesia. For years this toll road stands unconnected, until 2005 when construction of the Cipularang Toll Road was finished, connecting this toll road to the Jakarta-Cikampek Toll Road. A new toll road is under construction from the current terminus of Cileunyi towards the northeast with the goal of connecting this toll road to the Cikopo-Palimanan Toll Road with an expected completion date of 2023.

This toll road begins at the Padalarang interchange, the site of the intersection of roadways towards Jakarta via Puncak, Purwakarta, and Bandung. The interchange also marks the end of the Cipularang Toll Road. From there, the toll road passes through the southern side of Bandung, mostly running parallel with (although placing more southern) the conventional Bandung bypass (more commonly known as the Soekarno-Hatta road or Soetta after the founding fathers of Indonesia). The terminus of this toll road is located at the Cileunyi interchange, near the Bandung city boundary, where it continues as the Cisumdawu Toll Road. This terminus also leads towards the road heading towards the southern coast of Java via Garut, Tasikmalaya, Banjar and onwards, considered one of the most important roadways of the country.

This toll road also runs parallel with the Jakarta-Bandung High Speed Rail from Gedebage to the border between Cimahi and West Bandung where it splits, heading towards the existing railway line.

As the toll road bypasses downtown Bandung, it is also often used by local travellers, especially those working and living in the surrounding areas.

Currently, the toll road also links Bandung (and also points northwest such as Jakarta) towards popular holiday destinations such as Ciwidey (via the Soreang-Pasirkoja Toll Road), Puncak, and Lembang (via conventional roads). As such this toll road often gets congested, especially during the weekends or national holidays.

This toll road is not considered as part of the Trans-Java Toll Road network, although it is considered an auxiliary route.

== Exits ==
Province	Location	km	mi	Exit	Name	Destinations	Notes
West Java	Ngamprah, West Bandung Regency	55.90	34.73	Cipularang Toll Road			
West Java	South Cimahi, Cimahi	60.82	37.79	127; (60)	Pasteur Interchange	Pasteur Link; Cimahi; Bandung; Lembang	
West Java	Bandung Kulon, Bandung	65.7	40.8	132; (65)	Pasir Koja Interchange	Northbound; Pasir Koja; Leuwipanjang Terminal; Bandung; Southbound; Soreang–Pasir Koja Toll Road; Margaasih; Ciwidey	
West Java	Babakan Ciparay, Bandung	68.79	42.74	135; (68)	Kopo Toll Gate	Kopo; Margahayu; Soreang	
West Java	Bojongloa Kidul, Bandung	72.40	44.99	139; (72)	Moh. Toha Toll Gate	Muhammad Toha; Banjaran	
West Java	Bandung Kidul, Bandung	75.51	46.92	142; (75)	Buah Batu Toll Gate	Buah Batu; Dayeuhkolot	
West Java	Gedebage, Bandung	148.60	92.34	149; (82)	Gedebage Toll Gate	Gedebage; Tegalluar	
West Java	Cileunyi, Bandung Regency	89.18	55.41	155; (82)	Cileunyi Toll Gate	Cibiru; Cileunyi; Garut; Tasikmalaya	Southeast Terminus
West Java	Jatinangor, Sumedang Regency	89.71	55.74	Cisumdawu Toll Road			
1.000 mi = 1.609 km; 1.000 km = 0.621 mi: Electronic toll collection

=== Pasteur Link ===
Province	Location	km	mi	Exit	Name	Destinations	Notes
West Java	South Cimahi, Cimahi	0	0.0	127; (60)	Pasteur Interchange	Northbound; Padalarang; Cipularang Toll Road; Jakarta; Southbound; Soreang-Pasir Koja Toll Road; Kopo; Cileunyi	Western terminus
West Java	Central Cimahi, Cimahi	0.84	0.52	1	Baros Toll Gate	Baros; Cimahi; Leuwigajah	
West Java	Central Cimahi, Cimahi	1.17	0.73	Pasteur Toll Gate			
West Java	Cicendo, Bandung	5.19	3.22	5	Pasteur Toll Gate	Bandung; Lembang; Husein Sastranegara International Airport	Eastern terminus
1.000 mi = 1.609 km; 1.000 km = 0.621 mi: Electronic toll collection

== Rest Area ==
KM	Direction	Toilet	Mosque	Restaurant	Convenience Store	ATM	Gas Station	Rest Area
125	Westbound	check	check	check	check	check	check	check
147	Eastbound	check	check	check	check	check	check	check
149	Westbound	check	check	check	check	check	check	check
