= KJT =

KJT or kjt may also refer to:

- IATA code for Kertajati International Airport in northeastern West Java, Indonesia.
- Katarina Johnson-Thompson an English track and field athlete
- Karjat railway station, Maharashtra, India
