= Cileunyi–Sumedang–Dawuan Toll Road =

Toll Road in West Java, Indonesia

- Cisumdawu Toll Road
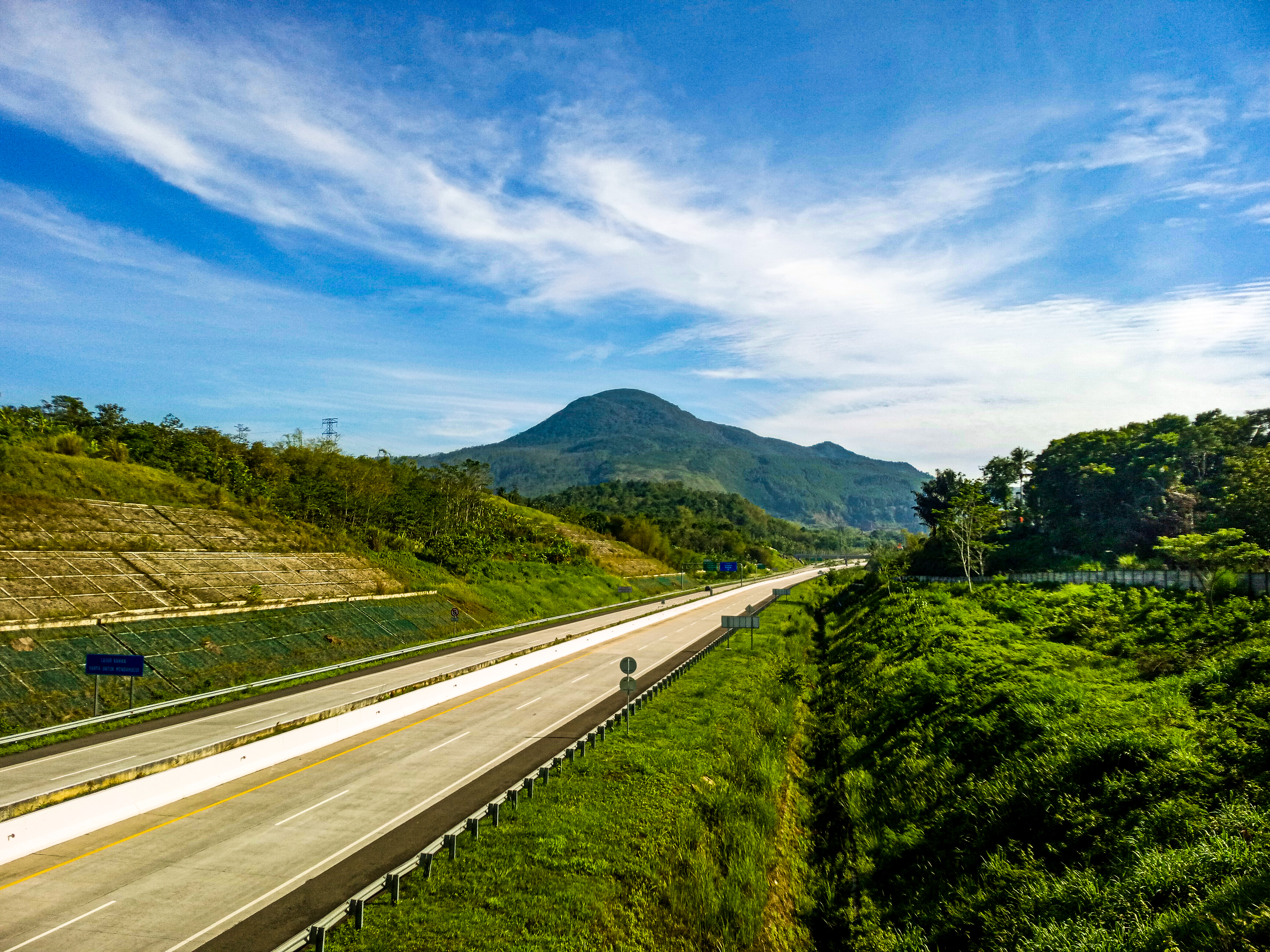
- Cisumdawu Toll Road in 2023

Route information
- Part of AH2
- Maintained by Citra Karya Jabar Tol (CKJT)
- Length: 60.3 km (37.5 mi)
- Existed: 2011–present
- History: Section I completed and opened in January 2022; Section II and III completed and opened in December 2022; Others completed and opened in July 2023

Major junctions
- Southwest end: Cileunyi Interchange
- Padalarang–Cileunyi Toll Road; AH2 – Cikopo–Palimanan Toll Road
- Northeast end: Kertajati Interchange

Location
- Country: Indonesia
- Major cities: Bandung Regency; Sumedang Regency; Majalengka Regency

Highway system
- Transport in Indonesia

Cileunyi–Sumedang–Dawuan Toll Road (Indonesian: Jalan Tol Cileunyi-Sumedang-Dawuan) or Jalan Tol Cisumdawu/Cisumdawu Toll Road is a controlled-access toll road in West Java, Indonesia, which was opened on 11 July 2023, thereby reducing the trip durations of Bandung-Cirebon to around 1 hour, Bandung-Kertajati to 40 minutes, and Cirebon-Kertajati to 20 minutes.

This will be the only toll road in Indonesia that has two tunnel (twin tunnel) length of 472 metres (1,549 ft) each and a diameter of 14 metres (46 ft) in Section II. The toll road will pass through Cileunyi, Tanjung Sari, Sumedang, Cimalaka, Legok, Ujung Jaya and Kertajati. This toll road will connect Padaleunyi Toll Road with Cikopo-Palimanan Toll Road. The toll road will connect Bandung with Kertajati International Airport, which opened in 2018.

== Construction ==
Due to the fact that the entire toll road is not feasible for investors, the government agreed to construct Section I and Section II. In Section II there is a 472-metre-long (1,549 ft) tunnel. Total cost of construction and acquisition of Cisumdawu Toll area is Rp 14 trillion. This fund is a combination of the State Budget (APBN) and loans from China. The remaining sections III to VI will be managed by Toll Road Enterprises (BUJT), namely PT Citra Marga Nusaphala Persada consortium, PT Waskita Toll Road, PT Pembangunan Perumahan, PT Brantas Abipraya, PT Jasa Sarana along 30.9 kilometres (19.2 mi).

This toll road is the first toll road in Indonesia to have a tunnel, there are located in section II, with a length of 472 meters and a diameter of 14 meters. The tunnel has two lanes in each directions.

The first section, connecting between Cileunyi and Rancakalong (now Pamulihan) for 11 kilometers, is officially open for use on 25 January 2022.

On 15 December 2022, sections II and III has been functionally opened, which connects Rancakalong (now Pamulihan)-Sumedang-Cimalaka for 21 kilometers as preparations for the 2022 Christmas and 2023 New Year holidays.

As of July 2023, both ends of the toll road have been connected and it was opened by the President of Indonesia Joko Widodo and the Chief Director of Citra Karya Jabar Tol Co. Ltd., Mohamad Jusuf Hamka.

== Sections ==
With the completion and opening of the toll road on 11 July 2023, it is expected to shorten the travel time between Bandung and Sumedang. At the same time share the traffic load on Cadas Pangeran Road which is always crowded and will be connected to the Cikopo-Palimanan Toll Road, which is part of the Trans Java Toll Road. The toll road will consists of 6 sections, concession of Section I is held by Shanghai Construction Group, Wijaya Karya and Waskita Karya, while concessions for Section II-VI are held by Citra Marga Nursaphala Persada (IDX:CMNP):

- Section I: Cileunyi–Tanjungsari (Pamulihan) (12.0 km (7.5 mi))
- Section II: Tanjungsari (Pamulihan)–Sumedang (17.5 km (10.9 mi))
- Section III: Sumedang–Cimalaka (3.7 km (2.3 mi))
- Section IV: Cimalaka–Legok (7.2 km (4.5 mi))
- Section V: Legok–Ujungjaya (15.9 km (9.9 mi))
- Section VI: Ujungjaya–Dawuan (4.0 km (2.5 mi))

== Toll gate ==
Note: The number on the exits is based on the distance from the western terminus of the Jakarta-Cikampek Toll Road, while the distance numbers are based on the distance from the western terminus of this toll road only

Province	Location	km	mi	Exit	Name	Destinations	Notes
West Java	Cileunyi, Bandung Regency	89.71	55.74	Padaleunyi Toll Road			
West Java	Cileunyi, Bandung Regency	89.71	55.74	156; (89)	Cileunyi Toll Gate	Cileunyi; Cibiru; Tasikmalaya; Garut	
West Java	Jatinangor, Sumedang Regency	94.17	58.51	161; (94)	Jatinangor Toll Gate	Jatinangor; Sukasari; Cimanggung	Northeast-bound exit & Southwest-bound entry only
West Java	Pamulihan, Sumedang Regency	99.58	61.88	166; (99)	Pamulihan Toll Gate	Pamulihan; Tanjungsari; Rancakalong	
West Java	Sumedang Utara, Sumedang Regency	116.39	72.32	183; (116)	Sumedang Toll Gate	Sumedang; Darmaraja; Wado	
West Java	Cimalaka, Sumedang Regency	119.95	74.53	186; (119)	Cimalaka Toll Gate	Cimalaka; Tanjungkerta; Tanjungmedar	
West Java	Paseh, Sumedang Regency	127.35	79.13	194; (127)	Paseh Toll Gate	Paseh; Conggeang; Buahdua	
West Java	Ujungjaya, Sumedang Regency	144.20	89.60	211; (144)	Cisumdawu Jaya Toll Gate	Ujungjaya; Palasah; Sakurjaya	
West Java	Ujungjaya, Sumedang Regency	150.80	93.70	Cisumdawu Utama Toll Gate			
West Java	Kertajati, Majalengka Regency	150.96	93.80	217; (150)	Kertajati Interchange	Cikopo–Palimanan Toll Road; Westbound; Cikedung; Subang; Jakarta; Eastbound; Kertajati International Airport; Sumberjaya; Palimanan	
1.000 mi = 1.609 km; 1.000 km = 0.621 mi: Electronic toll collection; Incomplete access; Route transition
