= Jakarta–Cikampek Toll Road =

Toll Road in Indonesia

Coordinates: 06°14′50.99″S 106°53′0.69″E

Jakarta-Cikampek Toll Road
- Jalan Tol Jakarta–Cikampek
- Japek Toll Road
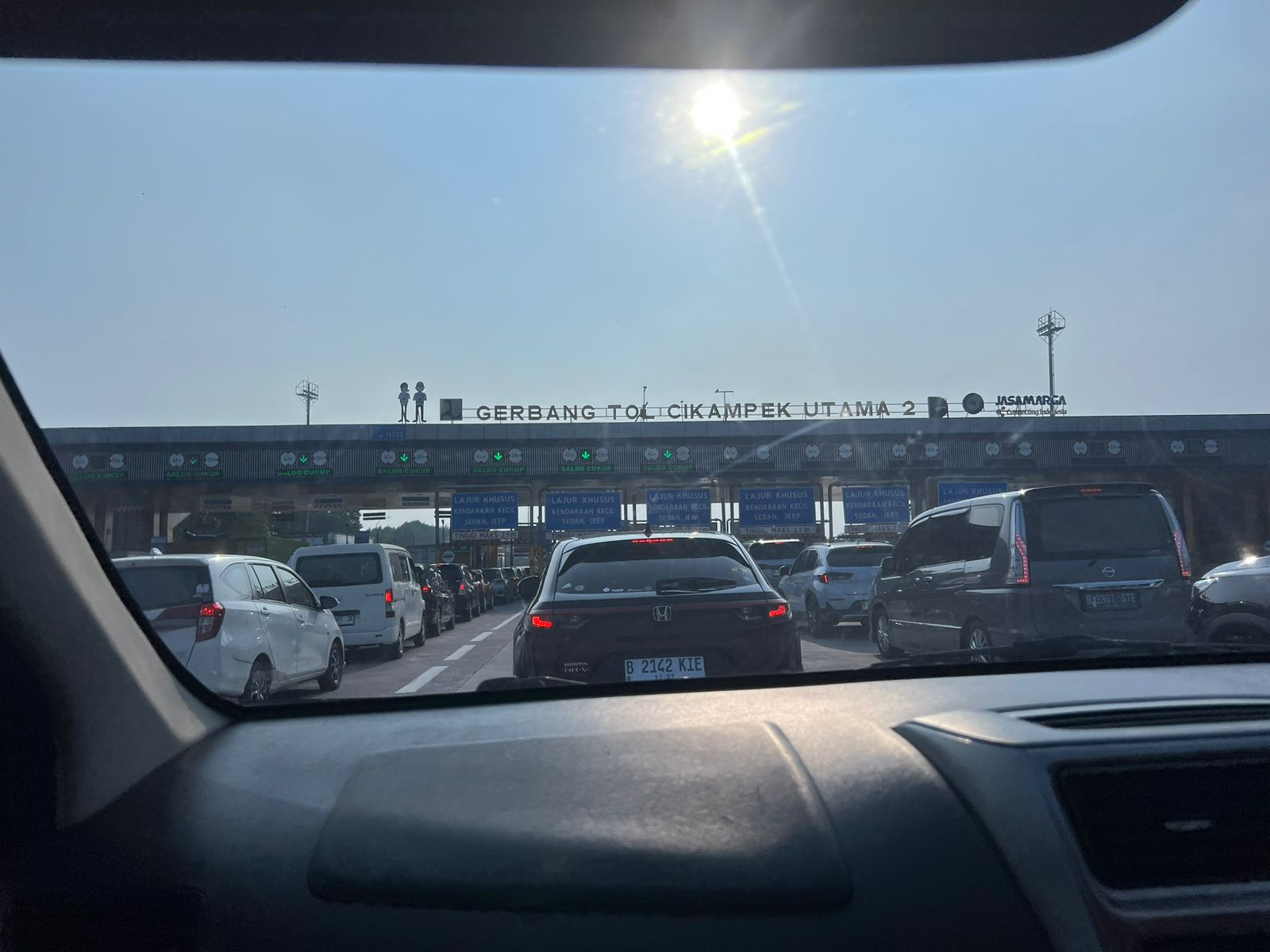
- Westbound Jakarta–Cikampek Toll Road In Cikampek Utama Toll Gate towards Jakarta in 2026

Route information
- Part of AH2
- Maintained by PT Jasamarga Transjawa Tol
- Length: 73 km (45 mi)
- Existed: 1988–present

Major junctions
- West end: Cawang
- Jakarta Inner Ring Road; Jakarta Outer Ring Road; Jakarta Outer Ring Road 2; Cipularang Toll Road; AH2 – Cikopo–Palimanan Toll Road
- East end: Cikampek IC

Location
- Country: Indonesia
- Provinces: DKI Jakarta; West Java
- Major cities: East Jakarta; Bekasi; Bekasi Regency; Karawang Regency; Purwakarta Regency

Highway system
- Transport in Indonesia

The Jakarta–Cikampek Toll Road (Indonesian: Jalan Tol Jakarta-Cikampek) or Japek is a controlled-access toll road in Indonesia that was inaugurated in 1988. A part of the Trans-Java Toll Road network, the highway links Jakarta with cities to its east in the province of West Java. Its 36.84 kilometer-long Cikunir–West Karawang section overlaps with the Sheikh Mohammed bin Zayed Skyway.

== History ==
Jakarta–Cikampek Toll Road was inaugurated on 19 November 1988, linking Jakarta, Bekasi, Bekasi Regency, Karawang Regency, and Purwakarta Regency. The loan was financed by the International Bank for Reconstruction and Development (IBRD).

Since 2005, this toll road also connects Bandung and Jakarta via the separate Cipularang Toll Road; the interchange to Bandung was built before the Kalihurip exit. AH2 This toll road is also part of AH2. The toll road is operated by PT Jasa Marga Tbk. In June 2015, the Cikopo–Palimanan Toll Road was opened, which means Jakarta and Cirebon are now connected via toll roads. An elevated toll road is built to reduce congestion of this toll road.

After the closure of Cikarang Utama Toll Gate on 23 May 2019, the central toll gate is relocated to Cikampek Utama (to/from Cirebon-Semarang-bound) and Kalihurip Utama (to/from Purwakarta–Cileunyi Toll Road-bound).

== Exits and Gates ==
Province	Location	km	mi	Exit	Name	Destinations	Notes
DKI Jakarta	Jatinegara, East Jakarta	0	0.0	0	Cawang Interchange	Jakarta Inner Ring Road; Westbound; Grogol; Tangerang; Soekarno-Hatta International Airport; Northbound; Jatinegara; Ancol; Tanjung Priok	Western terminus, End of Toll Route 7
DKI Jakarta	Makasar, East Jakarta	2.0	1.2	Halim Utama Toll Gate (westbound tolls only)			
DKI Jakarta	Makasar, East Jakarta	2.09	1.30	2	Halim Toll Gate	Cawang; Halim Airport; Jagorawi Toll Road	Westbound exit only
DKI Jakarta	Makasar, East Jakarta	4.02	2.50	4	Pondok Gede Barat Toll Gate	Pondok Gede; Jatiwaringin; Pondok Kelapa	
West Java	Pondok Gede, Bekasi	8.00	4.97	8	Pondok Gede Timur Toll Gate	Jatibening; Cikunir	Eastbound exit & Westbound entry only.
West Java	Pondok Gede, Bekasi	9.25	5.75	10	Cikunir Interchange	Jakarta Outer Ring Road; Northbound; Pondok Kelapa; Bintara; Tanjung Priok; Southbound; Jatiasih; Jatiwarna; Jagorawi Toll Road	
West Java	Pondok Gede, Bekasi	9.45	5.87	10		Sheikh Mohammed bin Zayed Skyway; East Karawang; Bandung; Cikampek	Small vehicles only, Westbound terminus, Eastbound entrance
West Java	South Bekasi, Bekasi	13.10	8.14	14	Bekasi Barat Toll Gate	West Bekasi; Pekayon; Kalimalang	
West Java	East Bekasi, Bekasi	16.59	10.31	16	Bekasi Timur Toll Gate	East Bekasi; Bulak Kapal; Bantar Gebang	
West Java	South Tambun, Bekasi Regency	21.06	13.09	21	Tambun Toll Gate	Tambun; Setu; Mustika Jaya	
West Java	Cikarang, Bekasi Regency	24.18	15.02	24	Cibitung Interchange	Jakarta Outer Ring Road 2; Northbound; Cibitung; Telaga Asih; Cibitung–Cilincing Toll Road; Tanjung Priok; Southbound; Setu; Cimanggis–Cibitung Toll Road; Depok	
West Java	Cikarang, Bekasi Regency	29.40	18.27	30	Cikarang Utara Toll Gate	Cikarang Dry Port	
West Java	Cikarang, Bekasi Regency	30.84	19.16	31	Cikarang Barat Toll Gate	North Cikarang; Lemahabang; Cibarusah	
West Java	Cikarang, Bekasi Regency	34.43	21.39	34	Cibatu Toll Gate	Cibatu; Jayamukti; Industrial Complex	
West Java	Cikarang, Bekasi Regency	37.02	23.00	37	Cikarang Pusat Toll Gate	East Cikarang; Pasirranji; Sukamahi	
West Java	West Telukjambe, Karawang Regency	46.84	29.11	47	Karawang Barat Toll Gate	West Karawang; Rengasdengklok	
West Java	West Telukjambe, Karawang Regency	47.45	29.48	47		Sheikh Mohammed bin Zayed Skyway; Jakarta; Bogor	Small vehicles only, Eastbound terminus, Westbound entrance
West Java	Klari, Karawang Regency	54.04	33.58	54	Karawang Timur Toll Gate	East Karawang; Klari	
West Java	Cikampek, Karawang Regency	66.96	41.61	67	Kalihurip Interchange	Cipularang Toll Road; Bandung	Northern end of Toll Route 4
West Java	Cikampek, Karawang Regency	67.93	42.21	68	Kalihurip Toll Gate	Dawuan; Kalihurip; Bukit Indah	
West Java	Cikampek, Karawang Regency	69.88	43.42	Cikampek Utama Toll Gate (Main toll gate)			
West Java	Bungursari, Purwakarta Regency	72.50	45.05	72	Cikampek Toll Gate	Cikampek; Bungursari; Purwakarta	Eastern terminus
West Java	Bungursari, Purwakarta Regency	73.80	45.86	Cikopo–Palimanan Toll Road			
1.000 mi = 1.609 km; 1.000 km = 0.621 mi: Concurrency terminus; Electronic toll collection; Incomplete access; Route transition

== Rest area ==
Rest area In Jakarta–Cikampek

KM	Direction	Facilities
06	Westbound	ATM, gas station, restaurant, mosque, mini market, service station
19	Eastbound	ATM, gas station, restaurant, mosque, mini market, service station
34	Westbound	restaurant, mosque, mini market, service station
39	Eastbound	ATM, gas station, restaurant, mosque, mini market, service station
42	Westbound	ATM, gas station, restaurant, mosque, mini market, service station
50	Eastbound	restaurant, mosque, mini market, service station (demolished)
57	Eastbound	ATM, gas station, restaurant, mosque, mini market, service station
62	Westbound	ATM, gas station, restaurant, mosque, mini market, service station
71	Westbound	ATM, gas station, restaurant, mosque, mini market, service station

== Road Information ==
Jakarta–Cikampek Toll Road is nominated as the most congested highway in Indonesia, especially in the area of Cikunir JCT- Bekasi Barat (although half of the expressway is 8-lanes dual carriageway (KM0-KM37) and another half is 6 lanes (KM37-KM73). By the completion of the Jakarta–Cikampek Elevated Toll Road spanning 36.45 kilometres (22.65 mi) from Cikunir to West Karawang, the capacity is expanded and congestion is slightly decreasing along this stretch (another stretch after Karawang Barat eastbound is, unfortunately, more congested.)

As of 2021, the Jakarta-Cikampek toll road is surrounded by 2 main projects which are under construction : LRT Cawang-Bekasi Timur (north section, KM0-KM18, under construction) and Jakarta-Bandung High-Speed Railway (south section, KM0-KM38).

The lane management along this expressway is provided in this table.

note : "JCT" here labels the interchange(s) connecting expressway-to-expressway, although in Indonesia, this specification is not used
Stretch	Length (km)	Lanes	Note
Cawang JCT-Cikunir JCT	10	8 (2x4)	Future expansion to 5 lanes per direction (if needed, to cater the influx of vehicles going Jakarta from both main expressway and elevated segment)
Cikunir JCT- Cikarang Utama	20	12 (2x4 on the main expressway + 2x2 on the elevated expressway)	Jakarta-Cikampek Elevated Toll Road begins here : the lane management on the main expressway is currently not consistent due to the incomplete repavement as for now.
Cikarang Utama-Cikarang Barat	1	14 (2x3 on the main expressway, 2x2 on the elevated expressway, 2x2 lanes as the local road serving Cikarang Utama and Cikarang Barat exits)	Cikarang Utama is formerly the main tollgate for motorists until it is demolished in 2018 due to Jakarta-Cikampek Elevated Tollway construction. The said location is now the eastbound exit and westbound exit only to Jababeka
Cikarang Barat-Cikarang Timur	6	12 (2x4 on the main expressway + 2x2 on the elevated expressway)	
Cikarang Timur-Karawang Barat JCT	11	10 (2x3 on the main expressway + 2x2 on the elevated expressway)	The elevated expressways veer to the side (from the median). The JCT in this segment is actually an offramp to the east (from the elevated expressway) and onramp to the west.
Karawang Barat JCT-Cikampek	25	6 (2x3)	Future to be dual-4-lanes from Karawang Barat JCT to Kalihurip JCT (going to Bandung (via Cipularang Toll Road) and Cirebon). Currently, the KM48-KM50 stretch has been expanded to 4 lanes per direction, also for KM67-62 which has since expanded to 7 lanes (4 lanes westbound + 3 lanes westbound) even when the elevated expressway is not built yet.

Jakarta–Cikampek Toll Road is implementing full open-toll system after the demolition of Cikarang Utama Toll Gate (where the west part is open-toll while the rest is closed-toll). The toll fare for this expressway is shown in this table starting from January 17, 2020.

Stretch	Toll fare (IDR) per class				
Stretch	I	II	III	IV	V
Cawang JCT-Pondok Gede Timur	4000	6000		8000	
Cawang JCT-Cikarang Barat	7000	10500		14000	
Cawang JCT-Karawang Barat	12000	18000		24000	
Cawang JCT-Cikampek	20000	30000		40000	
