= Cikampek–Purwakarta–Padalarang Toll Road =

Toll Road in Indonesia

Coordinates: 06°25′58.78″S 107°25′29.25″E

Cikampek-Purwakarta-Padalarang Toll Road
- Cipularang Toll Road
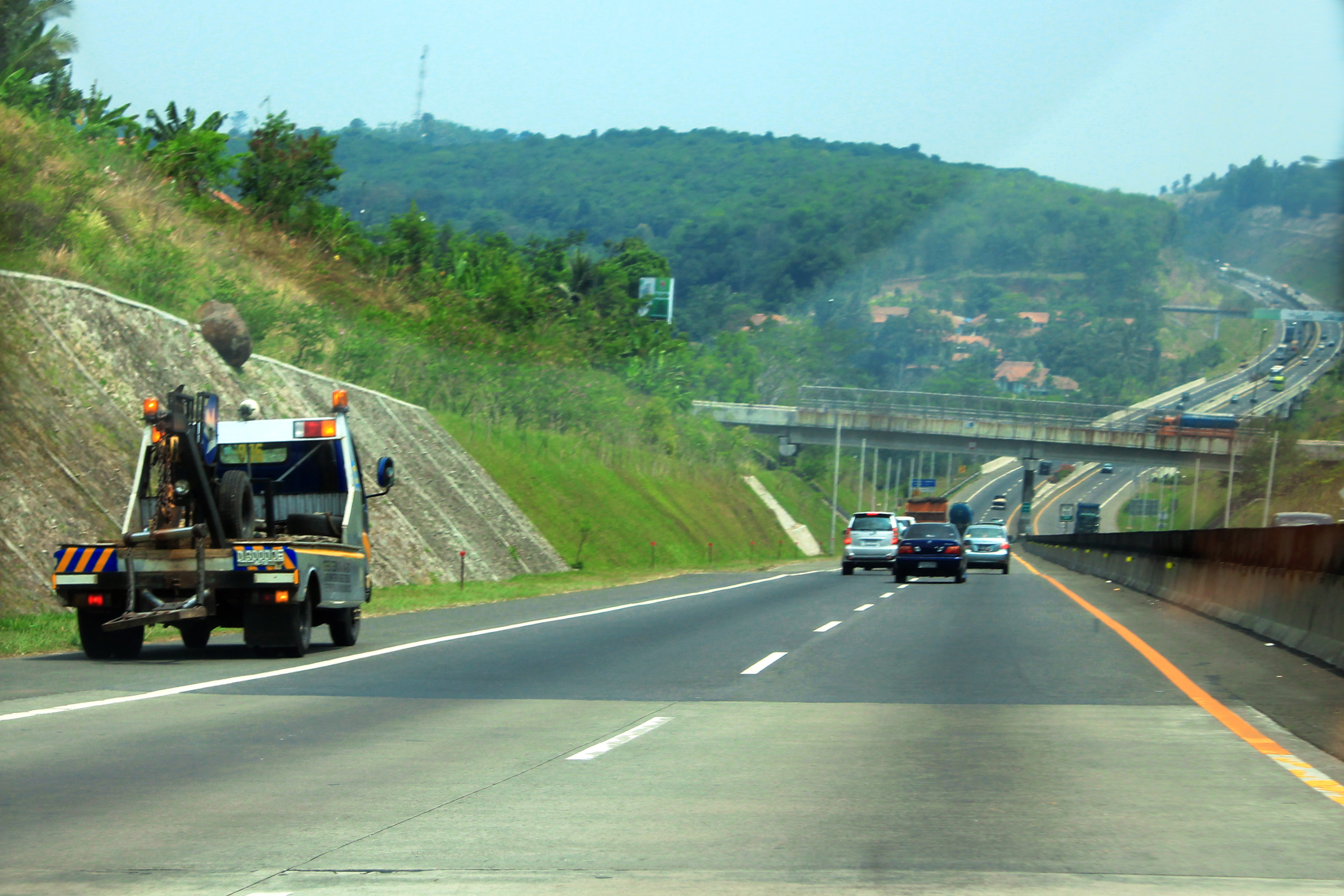
- Cipularang Toll Road in 2011

Route information
- Part of AH2
- Maintained by PT Jasa Marga Tbk
- Length: 58.5 km (36.4 mi)
- Existed: 2005–present

Major junctions
- North end: Kalihurip Interchange
- AH2 – Jakarta–Cikampek Toll Road; Padaleunyi Toll Road
- Southeast end: Padalarang Interchange

Location
- Country: Indonesia
- Major cities: Purwakarta Regency; West Bandung Regency

Highway system
- Transport in Indonesia

Cikampek–Purwakarta–Padalarang Toll Road or Cipularang Toll Road is a controlled-access toll road in Java, Indonesia. Opened in 2005, this road connects the Jakarta–Cikampek Toll Road and the Padaleunyi Toll Road. The toll road is operated by PT Jasa Marga Tbk. The names comes from abbreviation of Cikampek - Purwakarta - Padalarang. This toll road stretches along the mountains so the track is going up and downhill and many bends and bridges.

== Toll gate ==
| Province | Location | km | mi | Exit | Name | Destinations | Notes |
|---|---|---|---|---|---|---|---|
| West Java | Cikampek, Karawang Regency | 0 | 0.0 | 67; (0) | Kalihurip Interchange | Jakarta–Cikampek Toll Road; Westbound; Karawang; Bekasi; Jakarta; Eastbound; Cikopo–Palimanan Toll Road; Cikampek; Subang; Cirebon | Northwest terminus |
| West Java | Cikampek, Karawang Regency | 0.33 | 0.21 | Kalihurip Utama Toll Gate | | | |
| West Java | Babakancikao, Purwakarta Regency | 9.21 | 5.72 | 76; (9) | Sadang Interchange | Eastbound; Sadang; Purwakarta; Subang; Westbound; Jakarta–Cikampek South Toll Road (Under Construction) | |
| West Java | Jatiluhur, Purwakarta Regency | 17.21 | 10.69 | 84; (17) | Jatiluhur Toll Gate | Jatiluhur; Purwakarta; Ciganea | |
| West Java | Darangdan, Purwakarta Regency | 32.73 | 20.34 | 99; (32) | Darangdan Toll Gate | Darangdan; Cikalongwetan; West Bandung Regency | Southeast-bound only |
| West Java | Ngamprah, West Bandung Regency | 49.76 | 30.92 | 116; (49) | Cikamuning Toll Gate | Cikamuning; Cikalongwetan; Purwakarta | North-bound only |
| West Java | Ngamprah, West Bandung Regency | 54.87 | 34.09 | 121; (54) | Padalarang Timur Toll Gate | Padalarang; Cikalongwetan; Cianjur | |
| West Java | Ngamprah, West Bandung Regency | 55.90 | 34.73 | Padalarang–Cileunyi Toll Road | | | |
| West Java | 1.000 mi = 1.609 km; 1.000 km = 0.621 mi: Electronic toll collection; Incomplete access; Route transition | | | | | | |

== Rest areas ==
| KM | Direction | Toilet | Mosque | Restaurant | Convenience Store | ATM | Gas Station | Rest Area |
|---|---|---|---|---|---|---|---|---|
| 72 | Northbound | check | check | check | check | check | check | check |
| 72 | Southbound | check | check | check | check | check | check | check |
| 88 | Northbound | check | check | check | check | check | check | check |
| 88 | Southbound | check | check | check | check | check | check | check |
| 97 | Northbound | check | check | check | check | check | check | check |

== Lighting ==
As this toll road runs along hills that don't have access to electricity, PT Jasa Marga Tbk installs many solar street lights to brighten the road at night. Along KM 104 - 105, many solar street lights are installed on the two lanes of the road. Nevertheless, there are also some electric street lights along the toll road, such as around KM 91 and KM 95.

== Road width ==
Generally, each lane of the toll road has only two rows because of the ground contour. But, in some narrow curves in the road, there is an extra row on the left side of each lane which is used by heavy trucks and buses.
