= Majalengka Regency =

Regency in West Java, Indonesia

Majalengka Regency Kabupaten Majalengka
- Regency

Other transcription(s)
  - Sundanese: ᮊᮘᮥᮕᮒᮦᮔ᮪ ᮙᮏᮜᮦᮀᮊ
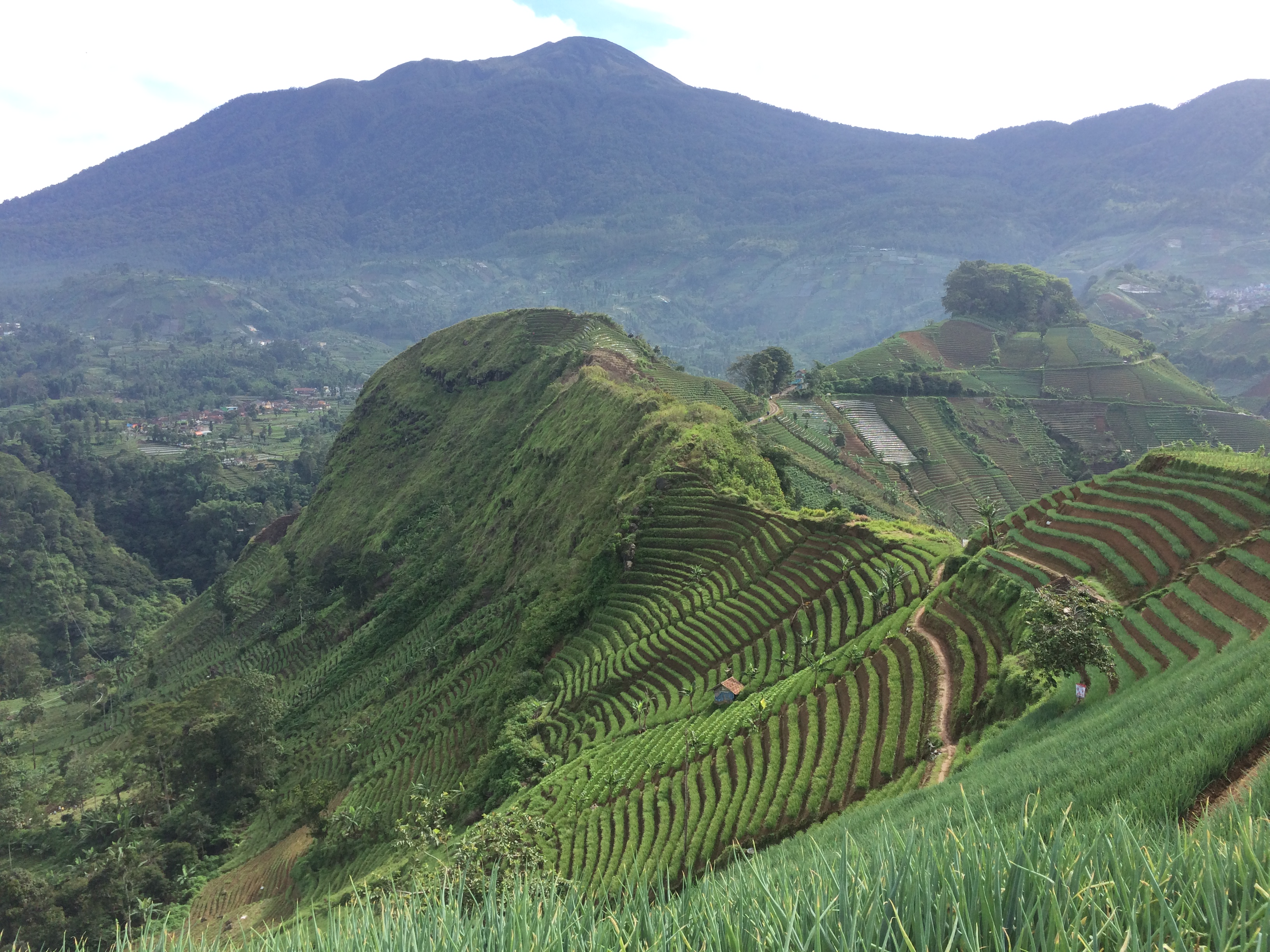
- Panyaweuyan Rice field in Argapura

- Coat of arms
- Motto(s): Sindang Kasih Sugih Mukti ᮞᮤᮔ᮪ᮓᮀ ᮊᮞᮤᮂ ᮞᮥᮌᮤᮂ ᮙᮥᮊ᮪ᮒᮤ
- Location within West Java

- Location in Java and Indonesia Majalengka Regency (Indonesia)
- Coordinates: 6°50′07″S 108°13′39″E
- Country: Indonesia
- Province: West Java

Government
  - Regent: Eman Suherman
  - Vice Regent: Dena Muhamad Ramdhan

Area
  - Total: 1,204.24 km^{2} (464.96 sq mi)

Population (mid 2025 estimate)
  - Total: 1,374,601
  - Density: 1,141.47/km^{2} (2,956.39/sq mi)
- Time zone: UTC+7 (WIB)
- Area code: +62 233
- Website: majalengkakab.go.id

Majalengka Regency is the landlocked regencies (kabupaten) in West Java, Indonesia. It covers an area of 1,204.24 square kilometres (464.96 sq mi) and had a population of 1,166,473 at the 2010 Census and 1,305,476 at the 2020 Census; the official estimate as of mid 2025 was 1,374,601 (comprising 688,244 males and 686,357 females). The administrative capital is the town of Majalengka.

== History ==
=== Administrative and politics ===
A besluit (decree) number 23 issued on 5 January 1819 by the Commissioners-General of the Dutch East Indies formally created Maja Regency. This new regency incorporated the former Rajagaluh and Talaga Regencies. The first regent appointed was Raden Adipati Denda Negara. Initially, districts of Maja were Talaga, Sindangkasih, and Rajagaluh with total area of 625 pal. Maja bordered Sumedang Regency to the west, Cirebon Regency and Kuningan Regency to the east, Indramayu Regency to the north, and Galuh and Sukapura to the south. In 1830s, districts of Maja were expanded to six: Maja, Sindangkasih, Rajagaluh, Talaga, Palimanan, and Kadongdong.

On 11 February 1840, Governor-General D. J. de Eerens enacted besluit no. 2, officially renaming Maja Regency to Majalengka Regency. The government seat, formerly located in Sindangkasih, was likewise redesignated as Majalengka. In 1862, the colonial government revised the administrative boundaries once again. Through besluit no. 4 dated 24 May 1862, the Governor-General reassigned Palimanan District to Cirebon Regency, citing its closer proximity to Cirebon's government seat compared to Majalengka's.

=== Socio-economics ===
In 1890, agricultural land covered 47,469 bau (1 bau ≈ 7,096.49 m^{2}). Of this area, about 40,704 bau or 85.75% consisted of irrigated rice fields. Another 5,678 bau or 11.9% was tegalan (non-irrigated dry fields), while the remaining 2.29% was coffee plantations.

Jatiwangi had the largest share of rice fields at 36.19%, followed by Talaga (21.12%), Rajagaluh (18.30%), Majalengka (16.12%), and Maja (8.27%). Dry fields were most extensive in Talaga, accounting for 38.76% of the total tegalan, while Rajagaluh had the smallest portion, covering 263 bau or 4.63%. Coffee cultivation was concentrated mainly in Talaga and Maja, each respectively contributed 55.29% and 32.94% totaling 959 bau or 88.22% of the coffee-growing area.

In December 1896, coffee estates employed 164,113 workers across 165 villages. By 1900, the workforce had increased by 2.92% to 168,905 people, and the number of participating villages rose to 167. Within the Cirebon Residency, Majalengka's share of the coffee labor force rose from 26.56% in 1896 to 36.67% in 1900. Its share of villages involved in coffee cultivation also increased, from 24.77% to 34.58% of all coffee-producing villages in the residency.

Between 1890 and 1902, Majalengka produced a total of 8,094 pikul (1 pikul ≈ 61.76kg) of coffee. During the same period, the Cirebon Residency produced 26,062 pikul, meaning Majalengka contributed 31.06% of the residency's total output. Majalengka's production was only second to Galuh Regency which produced 8,217 pikul. Majalengka's peak production occurred in 1892 reaching 2,105 pikul while the lowest output was recorded in 1902 at 52 pikul. The highest proportional contribution to the residency's production occurred in 1894 when Majalengka supplied 47.75% of the total, while the lowest was in 1902 at 6.88%.

Sugarcane cultivation in Majalengka began in Jatitujuh following the enactment of the 1870 Agrarian Law. In 1876, the colonial administration established a sugar factory in Kadipaten, operated by a company named Suiker Fabrick. The facility was expanded in 1896, along with an increase in production capacity. In the same year, another sugar factory was opened in Sutawangi, Jatiwangi District.

By 1901, sugarcane estates were operating in three districts: Rajagaluh with 615 bau, Majalengka with 1,091 bau, and Jatiwangi with 1,163 bau. With the factories in Kadipaten and Jatiwangi, and the additional plant in Parungjaya, total sugar output reached 200,466 pikul consisting of 153,233 pikul of top-grade sugar and 47,243 pikul of second-grade ones.

In 1904, the Governor-General granted erfpacht rights over 229 bau of land in Kadipaten to J. F. Vogel, Wilemine de Vogel, and Julius Charlotte de Vogel for sugarcane plantation. In 1906, these rights were sold to NV Cultuur Maatschappij Kadipaten.

In 1885, tea plantations in Majalengka covered 368 bau, concentrated in two areas: Carenang and Pasir Buntu.

In the commerce sector, the colonial administration recorded a total salt trading volume of 53,425 pikul from 1894 to 1899. The highest sales were reported in 1894, reaching 9,202 pikul, while the lowest occurred in 1897, amounting to 8,761 pikul.

In 1900, the colonial government constructed the Jatitujuh Dam to regulate the Cimanuk River. In 1911, work began on another structure, a manually operated movable dam called Gerak Dam (gerak means move) located about 500 meters away. It entered operation in 1916.

In the industrial sector, roof-tile production emerged in 1905 in Cikarokok, Burujul Wetan Village, Jatiwangi District. The industry initially grew slowly due to local taboos against using clay tiles. It began to expand around 1930 following the construction of colonial government housing that adopted clay roofing.

A livestock report submitted by Resident C. J. A. E. T. Hiljee on 3 June 1930 described the condition of animal husbandry in Majalengka Regency for the year 1926. The livestock raised consisted of horses, cattle, buffalo, pigs, sheep, and goats. Nearly all onderdistriks kept every type of livestock. Exceptions were noted: pigs were only raised in Liangjulang, Talaga, Cikijing, Jatiwangi, and Jatitujuh onderdistriks, while cattle were not raised in Sukahaji, Cikijing, and Leuwimunding onderdistriks.

The district with the largest number of livestock was Majalengka District recording 32,100 animals (approx. 32.17% of the total), while Rajagaluh District had the lowest count with 12,840 animals (approx. 12.87%). The most common animals raised were sheep, buffalo, and goats, which together accounted for 97,627 head (approx. 97.83%). Cattle were the least numerous with only 138 head (approx. 0.14%). Pigs, numbering 490 (approx. 0.49%), were more prevalent than cattle by comparison and were concentrated primarily in Jatiwangi and Talaga to meet demand from non-pribumi residents.

== Administrative districts ==
The Majalengka Regency consists of 26 districts (kecamatan), subdivided into 13 urban villages (kelurahan) and 318 rural villages (desa); 10 of the kelurahan are in Majalengka (town) District, and the other three are in Cigasong District. These districts are listed below with their areas and populations at the 2010 and 2020 Census together with the official estimates as of mid 2025. The table also includes the locations of the district administrative centres, the number of villages in each district (totalling 330 rural desa and 13 urban kelurahan), and their postcode(s).

Kode Wilayah	Name of District (kecamatan)	Area in km^{2}	Pop'n 2010 Census	Pop'n 2020 Census	Pop'n mid 2025 estimate	Admin centre	No. of villages	Post code(s)
32.10.01	Lemahsugih	78.64	57,038	63,223	66,571	Lemahputih	19	45465
32.10.02	Bantarujeg	66.52	42,634	46,289	48,740	Babakansari	13	45464
32.10.26	Malausma	45.04	40,936	47,784	50,314	Malausma	11	45460
32.10.03	Cikijing	43.54	59,577	67,467	71,039	Sukamukti	15	45466
32.10.23	Cingambul	37.03	35,719	42,604	44,860	Cingambul	13	45467
32.10.04	Talaga	43.50	43,045	47,742	50,270	Talagakulon	17	45463
32.10.22	Banjaran	41.98	23,903	25,015	26,340	Banjaran	13	45468
32.10.05	Argapura	60.56	33,460	36,470	38,401	Sukasari Kidul	14	45462
32.10.06	Maja	65.21	48,396	52,155	54,917	Maja Selatan	18	45461
32.10.07	Majalengka (town)	57.00	68,871	73,052	76,920	Majalengka Wetan	14 ^{(a)}	45411: 45419
32.10.20	Cigasong	24.17	33,937	37,763	39,763	Cicenang	10 ^{(b)}	45476
32.10.08	Sukahaji	32.52	39,579	46,943	49,429	Cikalong	13	45470
32.10.25	Sindang	23.97	14,409	16,912	17,807	Sindang	7	45471
32.10.09	Rajagaluh	34.37	41,377	46,819	49,298	Rajagaluh	13	45472
32.10.21	Sindangwangi	31.76	30,290	34,315	36,132	Sindangwangi	10	45474
32.10.10	Leuwimunding	32.46	55,736	63,932	67,317	Leuwimunding	14	45473
32.10.19	Palasah	38.69	45,661	53,275	56,096	Waringin	13	45475
32.10.11	Jatiwangi	40.03	82,524	90,174	94,949	Sutawangi	16	45454
32.10.12	Dawuan	23.80	44,491	47,633	50,155	Bojongcideres	11	45453
32.10.24	Kasokandel	31.61	45,858	52,808	55,604	Kasokandel	10	45451
32.10.18	Panyingkiran	22.98	29,576	32,691	34,422	Panyingkiran	9	45459
32.10.13	Kadipaten	21.86	43,346	47,294	49,798	Heuleut	7	45452
32.10.14	Kertajati	138.36	42,263	47,578	50,097	Kertajati	14	45457
32.10.15	Jatitujuh	73.66	50,864	55,192	58,114	Jatitengah	15	45458
32.10.16	Ligung	62.25	56,328	65,770	69,293	Ligung	19	45456
32.10.17	Sumberjaya	32.73	56,655	64,576	67,995	Sumberjaya	15	45455 ^{(c)}
	Total	1,204.24	1,166,473	1,305,476	1,374,601	Majalengka	343	

Note: (a) comprising 10 kelurahan (Babakan Jawa, Cicurug, Cijati, Cikasarung, Majalengka Kulon, Majalengka Wetan, Munjul, Sindangkasih, Tarikolot and Tonjong) and 4 desa. (b) comprising 3 kelurahan (Cicenang, Cigasong and Simpeureum) and 7 desa.
(c) except for the village (desa) of Banjaran, which has a postcode of 45468.

The incumbent regency officer (Bupati) of this regency is Dr. H. Karna Sobahi.

== Transportation ==
=== Road ===
In the colonial period, Majalengka became more accessible after the Anyer Panarukan post Road was routed through the regency. The government also improved the Majalengka-Ciamis road via Cikijing.

=== Tram ===
A decree issued by the Cirebon Resident on 31 March 1900 authorized construction of a tram line from Kadipaten to Cirebon funded by sugar factories in Majalengka. Although initially designed to transport sugar, the tram later served public passengers and as military transport.

=== Toll Road Access ===
KM	Toll Road	Destination
156	Padaleunyi Toll Road	Cileunyi, Cirebon, Tasikmalaya, Majalengka
158	Cikopo-Palimanan Toll Road	Kertajati, Majalengka, Sumedang

=== Kertajati International Airport ===
The new airport serves Bandung and West Java. The construction was started in 2015 and inaugurated in 2018 after the completion of the first phase.

== Tourism ==
=== Mount Panten ===
In March 2012, two foreign national champion paragliders surveyed Mount Panten. Landing area, wind velocity, and mainly take-off area are suitable for paragliding world championship. The take-off area is very vast, possible to make take-off for several paragliders at the same time, and cannot be found in other countries.

== Demographics ==
The earliest recorded census was conducted in 1829 by Cirebon Residency. The population was 132,257 people, of which 99.26% were pribumi. The remaining non-native population was dominated by the Chinese community making up 98.07% of that group. There were 32,271 households typically with two to three children each.

In 1891 census, the population was 268,805 people. In 1930, with population of 444,163 people and an area of 1,091 square kilometers, the density reached 407.12 people per square kilometer. Within the Cirebon Residency, Majalengka ranked second in density just below Cirebon Regency. At the Provincie West Java level, it place third, following Cirebon Regency and Batavia.

Total population of Majalengka Regency (1829–1930)
Year	Population
1829	132,257
1847	128,218
1867	184,782
1873	201,211
1874	202,017
1875	201,987
1876	202,022
1891	268,805
1892	273,078
1893	274,675
1894	276,960
1930	444,163

Demographic distribution by district (1930)
No.	District	Area (km^{2})	Indigenous	European	Chinese	Other Asian	Total Population	Density (per km^{2})
1	Majalengka	215	119,441	222	1,188	121	120,972	562.66
2	Jatiwangi	460	126,275	92	1,247	224	127,838	277.91
3	Rajagaluh	159	82,201	61	557	46	82,865	521.16
4	Talaga	257	111,699	18	768	3	112,488	437.70
Total		1,091	439,616	393	3,760	394	444,163	407.12

== Works cited ==
- Falah, Miftahul (June 2011). "Sejarah Sosial Ekonomi Majalengka pada Masa Pemerintahan Hindia Belanda (1819–1942)". Patanjala: Jurnal Penelitian Sejarah dan Budaya (in Indonesian). 3 (2). Balai Pelestarian Sejarah dan Nilai Tradisional Bandung: 190–209.
