= Soreang–Pasir Koja Toll Road =

Toll Road in Indonesia

- Soroja Toll Road
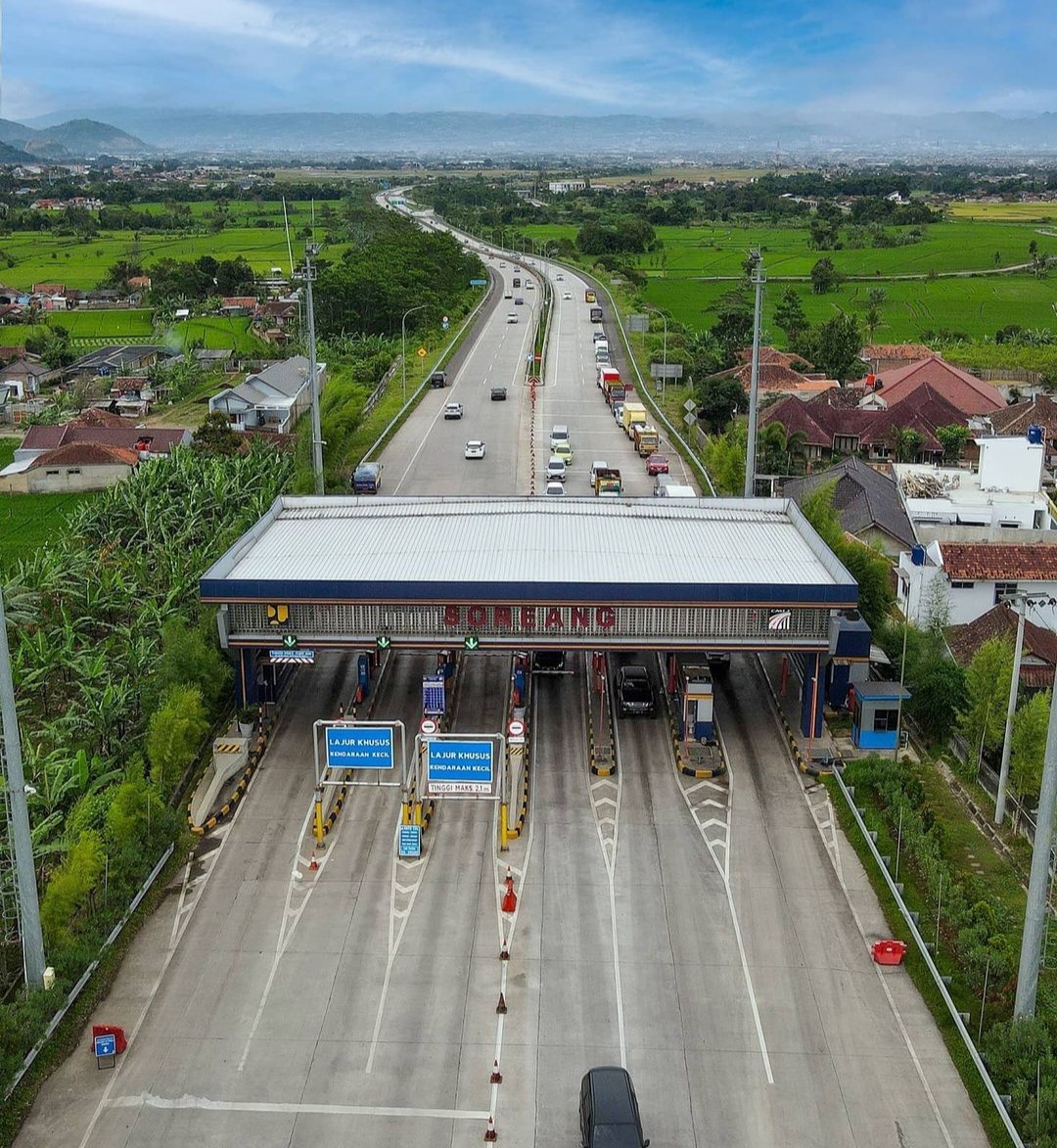
- Soroja Toll Road at Soreang Toll Gate.

Route information
- Part of AH2
- Maintained by PT Citra Marga Lintas Jabar (CMLJ)
- Length: 10.6 km (6.6 mi)
- Existed: 2017–present

Major junctions
- South end: Soreang
- Padalarang-Cileunyi Toll Road
- North end: Pasir Koja Interchange

Location
- Country: Indonesia
- Major cities: Bandung; Bandung Regency

Highway system
- Transport in Indonesia

Soreang–Pasir Koja Toll Road or Soroja is a controlled-access toll road connecting Soreang to Pasir Koja in Bandung Regency, West Java, Indonesia. The 10.6-kilometer toll road section connects with the existing Purbaleunyi Toll Road, linking Soreang, the capital of Bandung Regency, with a direct access to the capital city Jakarta and the Cikarang industrial area to the north. The toll road will connect directly to Purbaleunyi Toll Road at KM 132, which connects westward to Cikampek and Jakarta and eastward to Cileunyi. The toll road was inaugurated by Indonesian President Joko Widodo on 4 December 2017.

== Sections ==
The toll road has 3 sections,

- Pasirkoja-Margaasih-3.05 km
- Margaasih-Katapang −2.2 km
- Katapang-Soreang −2.9 km

== Exits ==
Province	Location	km	mi	Exit	Name	Destinations	Notes
West Java	Margaasih, Bandung Regency	0	0.0	0	Pasir Koja Interchange	Purbaleunyi Toll Road; Northbound; Pasir Koja; Leuwipanjang Terminal; Jamika; Westbound; Pasteur; Padalarang; Jakarta; Eastbound; Kopo; Muhammad Toha; Cileunyi	Northern terminus
West Java	Margaasih, Bandung Regency	3	1.9	3.6	Marga Asih Timur Toll Gate	Marga Asih; Cipatik; Nanjung	
West Java	Margaasih, Bandung Regency	4	2.5	4	Marga Asih Barat Toll Gate	Marga Asih; Kopo; Nanjung	
West Java	Kutawaringin, Bandung Regency	6.8	4.2	6	Kutawaringin Barat Toll Gate	Katapang; Kutawaringin; Cipatik; Si Jalak Harupat Stadium	
West Java	Kutawaringin, Bandung Regency	7.4	4.6	7	Kutawaringin Timur Toll Gate	Katapang; Kutawaringin; Cipatik; Si Jalak Harupat Stadium	
West Java	Soreang, Bandung Regency	8.8	5.5	Soreang Toll Gate			
West Java	Soreang, Bandung Regency	9.2	5.7	9	Soreang Ramp	Soreang; Banjaran; Ciwidey	Southern terminus
1.000 mi = 1.609 km; 1.000 km = 0.621 mi: Electronic toll collection; Incomplete access; Route transition

== See also ==
- Trans-Java toll road
