= South Bekasi =

South Bekasi Bekasi Selatan
- District
- Location in Bekasi, Java and Indonesia South Bekasi (Java) South Bekasi (Indonesia)
- Coordinates: 6°15′20″S 106°58′07″E
- Country: Indonesia
- Province: West Java
- City: Bekasi

Area
  - Total: 15.81 km^{2} (6.10 sq mi)

Population (mid 2023 estimate)
  - Total: 214,493
- Time zone: UTC+7 (IWST)
- Area code: (+62) 21
- Vehicle registration: B
- Villages: 5
- Website: kec-bekasiselatan.bekasikota.go.id

South Bekasi (Indonesian: Bekasi Selatan) is one of the twelve administrative districts (kecamatan) within the municipality of Bekasi, in Jabodetabek (Jakarta's metropolitan area) on the island of Java, Indonesia. The district covers an area of 1,581 hectares (3,907 acres), and had a population of 203,654 at the 2010 Census and 210,805 at the 2020 Census; the official estimate as at mid 2023 was 214,493 - comprising 106,105 malkes and 108,388 females.

The administrative centre is located in Pekayon Jaya, and the district is sub-divided into five urban "villages" or communities (kelurahan), as listed below with their areas, their populations as at the 2020 Census and th official estimates as at mid 2023, together with their postcodes.

Kode Wilayah	Name of kelurahan	Area in km^{2}	Population 2020 Census	Population mid 2023 estimate	Post code
32.75.04.1001	Pekayon Jaya	4.34	58,269	58,898	17148
32.75.04.1002	Marga Jaya	1.67	16,337	17,532	17141
32.75.04.1003	Jaka Mulya	3.08	37,410	36,490	17146
32.75.04.1004	Jaka Setia	3.86	42,270	43,517	17147
32.75.04.1005	Kayuringin Jaya	2.86	56,519	58,056	17144
32.75.04	Totals	15.81	210,805	214,493	

Public schools were started in the district in 1994. As of 2013 all of the villages had health centres except for Jaka Setia.

== Geography ==
South Bekasi lies in the lowlands with elevations from 0 to 25 metres. The area is flat lying with an average slope of 2%, and is subject to flooding during and after heavy rains.
