= Cikopo–Palimanan Toll Road =

Toll road in Indonesia

- Jalan Tol Cikopo–Palimanan
- Cipali Toll Road
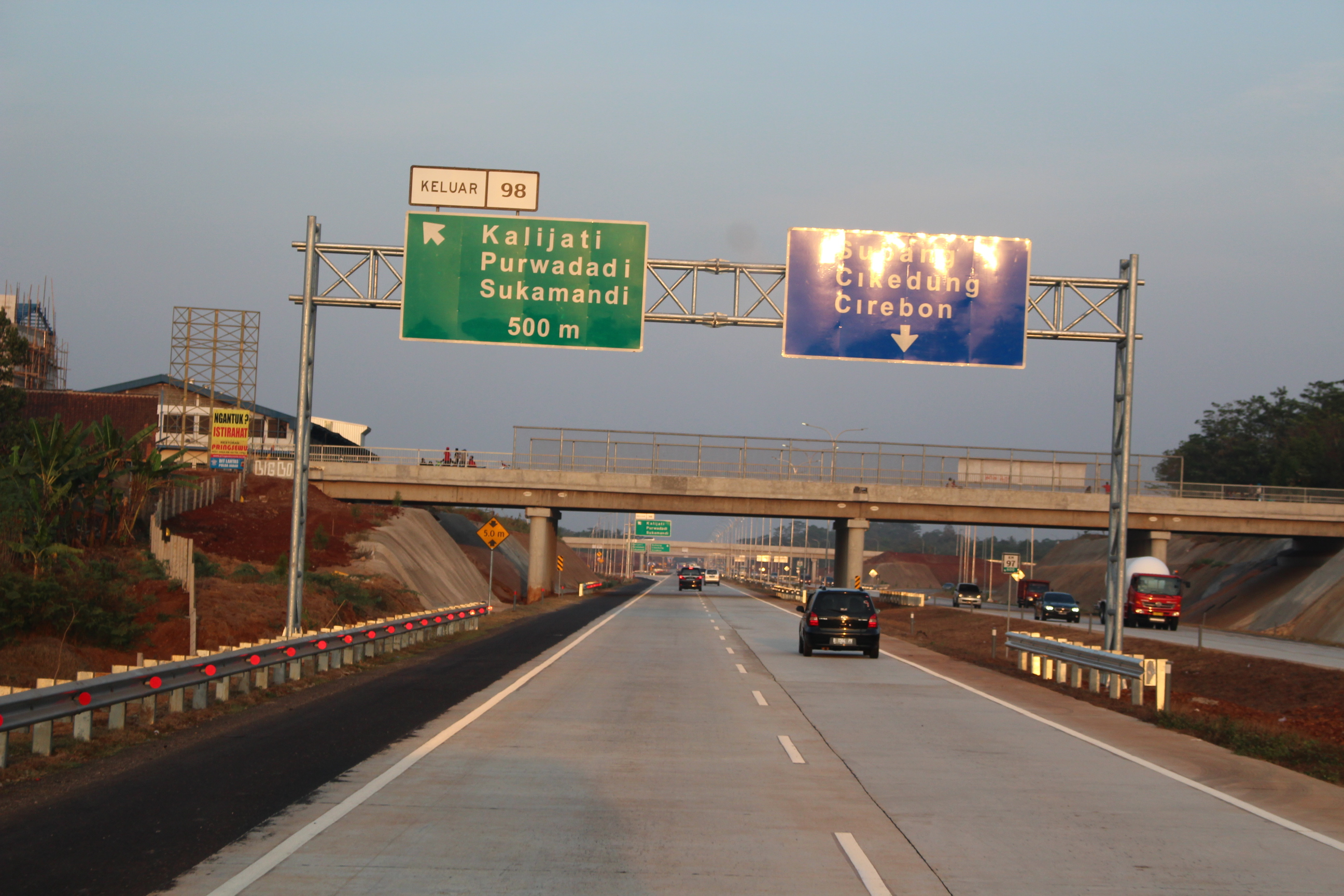
- Eastbound Cikopo–Palimanan Toll Road heading to Palimanan, Cirebon Regency in 2015

Route information
- Part of AH2
- Maintained by Lintas Marga Sedaya (Astra Infra Toll Road Cikopo Palimanan)
- Length: 116 km (72 mi)
- Existed: 13 June 2015–present
- History: Built in 2011-2015

Major junctions
- West end: Cikopo
- AH2 – Jakarta–Cikampek Toll Road; Cisumdawu Toll Road; AH2 – Palimanan–Kanci Toll Road
- East end: Palimanan

Location
- Country: Indonesia
- Major cities: Purwakarta, Subang, Majalengka, Indramayu, Cirebon

Highway system
- Transport in Indonesia

The Cikopo–Palimanan Toll Road (shortened to Cipali Toll Road) is a controlled-access toll road that connects Cikopo with Palimanan in the province of West Java, Indonesia. Being a part of the Trans-Java Toll Road, it was opened on 13 June 2015. At 116 kilometres (72 mi) in length, it is the longest toll road in Java. The toll road is also 40 kilometres (25 mi) shorter than the traditional North Coastal Road of West Java.

== Sections ==
Cikopo–Palimanan Toll Road is 116 kilometres (72 mi) in length and consists of 6 sections:

- Section I, Cikopo–Kalijati (29.12 km (18.09 mi))
- Section II, Kalijati–Subang (9.56 km (5.94 mi))
- Section III, Subang–Cikedung (31.37 km (19.49 mi))
- Section IV, Cikedung–Kertajati (17.66 km (10.97 mi))
- Section V, Kertajati–Sumberjaya (14.51 km (9.02 mi))
- Section VI, Sumberjaya–Palimanan (13.78 km (8.56 mi))

== History ==
Following the completion of the Jakarta–Cikampek Toll Road in 1988, the Indonesian government began studying the extension of the toll road network eastward to accommodate increasing traffic volumes on the North Coast Road (Jalan Raya Pantura), which had become increasingly congested. Initial planning for the project commenced in 1988, when the government commissioned the Japan International Cooperation Agency (JICA) to conduct a feasibility study for a toll road linking Cikampek and Cirebon. The study was carried out between 1988 and 1990.

The JICA study proposed a two-phase development programme. The first phase included seven toll plazas located at Cikampek, Subang, Cikedung, Dawuan, Palimanan, Cirebon, and East Cirebon. The second phase proposed additional toll plazas at Kalijati, South Haur (Haur Selatan), Sumberjaya, and West Cirebon. The toll road was planned as a four-lane controlled-access highway and was projected to open to traffic in 1998. The estimated construction cost for the first phase was Rp747 billion.

However, only the section between Palimanan and Kanci was completed as originally planned, opening to traffic in 1998 as the Palimanan–Kanci Toll Road. The remaining sections of the proposed Cikampek–Cirebon toll road were postponed and were not realized until 17 years later, when they were developed as the Cikopo–Palimanan Toll Road (Cipali).

Development of the Cikopo–Palimanan Toll Road formally commenced with a groundbreaking ceremony on 8 December 2011, officiated by Minister of Public Works Djoko Kirmanto during the presidency of Susilo Bambang Yudhoyono.

The project is estimated at Rp12.562 trillion ($1.4 billion) and is owned by a joint venture company PT Lintas Marga Sedaya with portion 55 percent is owned by PLUS Expressways Berhad and 45 percent is owned by PT Bhaskara Utama for 35 years concession.

In July 2012, 95 percent of land acquisition has been done and bank loan commitment of Rp9 trillion has been got, but the loan only can be withdrawn after 100 percent of land acquisition has been finished. Inline with already finished of all land acquisitions, in September 2012, twenty two banks agreed to initial disburse the fund of the project. At end of January 2014, 15 percent physical project has been finished and predicted the toll road will be operated at end of 2014 or early 2015. On 29 October 2014, PT Lintas Marga Sedaya announced that the toll road would be completed by June 2015.

=== Naming controversy ===
Purwakarta Regent, Dedi Mulyadi, protested the naming of the Cikampek - Palimanan toll road due to the location of the toll road segment is located in Cikopo, Purwakarta Regency, instead of Cikampek which is located at Karawang Regency. He pointed out past mistakes in naming the Jakarta-Cikampek toll road. The location of the interchanges are geographically located in Cikopo, Purwakarta. The distance between the interchanges and the toll gate to the boundary of Cikopo with Cikampek is still 3 kilometres (1.9 mi) away. Finally, during the inauguration in June 2015 the name of this toll road was changed from the Cikampek-Palimanan Toll Road (Cikapali) to Cikopo–Palimanan Toll Road (Cipali).

=== Opening and accidents ===
On 13 June 2015, Cikopo–Palimanan toll road was opened by Indonesian president, Joko Widodo. Since then, Jakarta and Cirebon are now directly connected by toll road. Within six months of being inaugurated by President Jokowi, there have been 88 accidents in this Cikopo-Palimanan toll causing a number of people to be killed and injured. According to Ofyar Z. Tamin, Transport Expert from Bandung Institute of Technology, argued that there are 3 possible major factors that caused accidents and incidents in this toll road:

- Design flaws

Although Tamin argued that this factor isn't as significant as it involves Planning Consultant in the design.

- Vehicles that are Being used

Tamin argued that most vehicles who were involved in the accidents can range from brake failures or overloaded capacity.

- Driver's condition

Tamin argued that drivers who are feeling tired or drowsy or even those who are chasing schedules, are forcing themselves to drive in unfit conditions. He further explained that one of the efforts that can be done to reduce the high number of accidents on the Cipali Toll Road is to increase the number of signs, markers, and road signs, including warning signs.

== Facilities ==
=== Exits ===
The entire route is located in West Java.

Note: The number on the exits is based on the distance from the western terminus of the Jakarta-Cikampek Toll Road, while the distance numbers are based on the distance from the western terminus of this toll road only

Legend:

- I/C - Interchange, I/S - Intersection, RSA - Rest and service area, OBR - Overhead bridge restaurant, R/R - Restaurant and rest plaza, L/B - Layby, V/P - Vista point, TN - tunnel, T/P - Toll plaza, BR - Bridge
- C - Cloverleaf, S - Stack, T-A - Trumpet-A, T-B - Trumpet-B, DT - Directional-T/Y, SDT - Semi-Directional-T/Y, P-Y - Partial-Y, D - Diamond, P-C - Partial cloverleaf, D-D - Diverging diamond, D-R - Direct ramp

Regency	Location	km	mi	Exit	Name	Destinations	Notes
Purwakarta	Bungursari	0.0	0.0	72	Cikampek Toll Gate	Cikampek, Bungursari, Purwakarta; Jakarta–Cikampek Toll Road	Western terminus
Subang	Kalijati	25.51	15.85	98	Kalijati Toll Gate	Kalijati, Purwadadi, Sukamandi	
Subang	Subang	37.06	23.03	109	Subang Toll Gate	Subang, Pamanukan, Lembang	
Indramayu	Terisi	65.42	40.65	137	Cikedung Toll Gate	Cikedung, Cikamurang, Indramayu	
Majalengka	Kertajati	79.61	49.47	152	Kertajati Junction	Cisumdawu Toll Road – Sumedang, Bandung	
Majalengka	Kertajati	85.85	53.34	159	Kertajati Toll Gate	Kertajati International Airport, Kertajati, Majalengka	
Majalengka	Sumberjaya	101.98	63.37	174	Sumberjaya Toll Gate	Sumberjaya, Jatiwangi, Bandung	
Cirebon	Palimanan	116.06	72.12	188	Palimanan Interchange	Palimanan, Jatibarang, Indramayu	Eastern terminus
Cirebon	Palimanan	116.26	72.24	Through to Palimanan–Kanci Toll Road			
1.000 mi = 1.609 km; 1.000 km = 0.621 mi: Route transition

*Although Kertajati International Airport will be connected directly to Cisumdawu Toll Road, the design of construction might won't realize the plan since the Kertajati Airport Link is being constructed in the place where Kertajati Trumpet Exit is. The number of km is just the assumption, regarding the safety connections in the expressway.

=== Rest areas ===
Location (KM)	Direction	Type	Gas Station	Mosque	Restaurant	Toilet
86	Eastbound	B		check	check	check
86	Westbound	B		check	check	check
102	Eastbound	A	check	check	check	check
101	Westbound	A	check	check	check	check
130	Eastbound	B		check	check	check
130	Westbound	B		check	check	check
166	Eastbound	A	check	check	check	check
164	Westbound	A	check	check	check	check

== Future ==
Due to the operational of Jakarta–Cikampek Elevated Toll Road (renamed as Sheikh Mohammed bin Zayed Skyway in April 2021), the government will expand this toll road gradually to 3-4 lanes per direction from the current 2, with the priority seeks for Cikampek terminus, to handle more traffic influx using this toll road. The toll road is believed to be overcap in the near term since the operation of the said elevated toll road.

The Cisumdawu Toll Road also connects this toll road to Bandung and Kertajati International Airport in the Kertajati proper area. Patimban Deep Sea Port is planned to be connected by Patimban Access Toll Road to Cipali Toll Road.
