= Cikampek =

- District
- Interactive map of Cikampek
- Coordinates: 6°25′02″S 107°25′58″E
- Country: Indonesia
- Province: West Java
- Regency: Karawang Regency

Area
  - Total: 36.34 km^{2} (14.03 sq mi)
- Elevation: 46 m (151 ft)

Population (mid 2024 estimate)
  - Total: 127,173
  - Density: 3,500/km^{2} (9,064/sq mi)
- Time zone: +7

Cikampek is an administrative district (kecamatan) of Karawang Regency, West Java, Indonesia and is divided into 10 administrative villages (kelurahan). It covers a land area of 36.34 km^{2}, and had a population of 127,173 as at mid 2024. The distance from Cikampek to Karawang city is 21 miles (34 km).

== Transportation ==
Cikampek District is situated in an area where many routes pass through from Jakarta to Central Java and East Java, including railway stations linking the cities of Jakarta, Bandung and Cirebon by rail, and is a main intersection of routes between the three cities.

Cikampek has two railway stations:

1. Cikampek Station (Operations Area 1 Jakarta)
2. Dawuan Station (Operations Area 1 Jakarta)

Public transport routes:

- Bus: Cikampek - Bekasi (Bekasi Trans), Cikampek–Tasik, Cikampek–KP.Rambutan, Cikampek–Bogor, Cikampek–Pulogadung
- Train: Services to the major cities of Cirebon, Semarang, Yogyakarta, Bandung, Surabaya.
- Transport ELF: Cikampek–Bandung, Cikampek–Pamanukan, Cikampek–Pabuaran, Cikampek–Plered

Cikampek is also the name of a toll road that links the district to Jakarta and two other toll roads connect Cikampek to other cities in Java:

1. Jakarta–Cikampek Toll Road
2. Cipularang Toll Road
3. Cikampek–Palimanan Toll Road

The distance from Cikampek to the North Coast of West Java is 19 miles (30 km).

== Economy ==
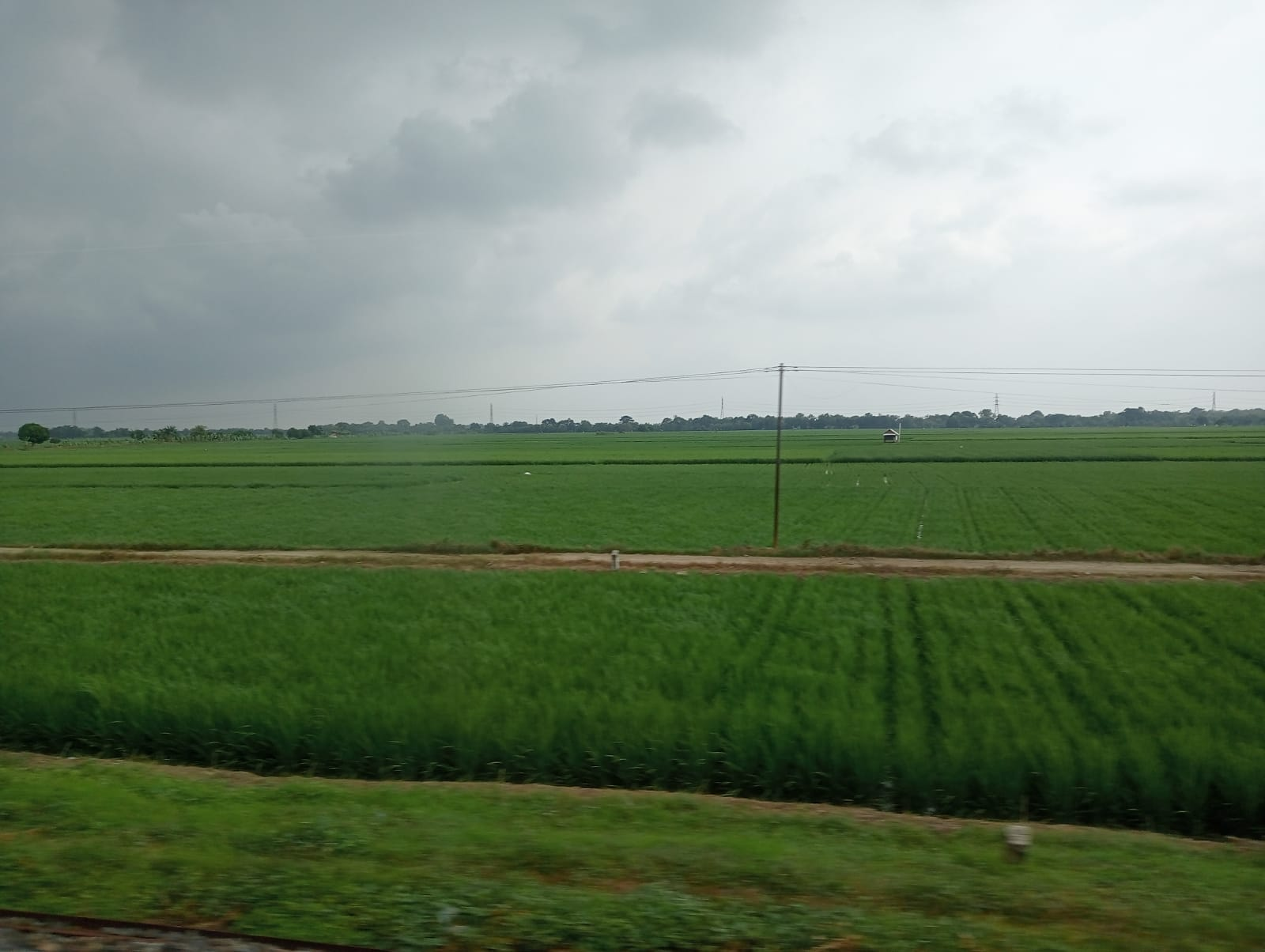
Rice field in Cikampek area in 2024.

Cikampek's main sources of income are industry, agriculture and trade and the city is known as the center of trade and industry in the Karawang Regency. The people of Cikampek are predominantly merchants, factory workers and civil servants, or work in the private sector. There are at least 4 major industrial areas in the district:

1. Bukit Indah City
2. Autocar Cikampek Industrial Zone
3. Industrial Area Indotaisei
4. PT.Pupuk Kujang Cikampek (Persero), a subsidiary of PT Pupuk Sriwijaya, Palembang

The Pertamina Fuel Depot has operated since 2006to serve consumers in the wider area east of Jakarta, including the city of Bekasi, Karawang Regency, Purwakarta Regency, Indramayu Regency, the city of Cirebon and Cirebon Regency.
