= South Cimahi =

South Cimahi Kecamatan Cimahi Selatan
- District
- Interactive map of South Cimahi
- Coordinates: 6°52′59″S 107°32′29″E
- Country: Indonesia
- Province: West Java
- City: Cimahi

Population (2014)
  - Total: 238,792
- Time zone: UTC+7 (WIB)
- Postal Code: 40531–40535

South Cimahi is a district of Cimahi, West Java, Indonesia. South Cimahi had a population of 238,792 in 2014.

== Villages ==
South Cimahi is divided into five villages:

- Cibeber (40531)
- Leuwigajah (40532)
- Utama (40533)
- Melong (40534)
- Cibeureum (40535)
