= Central Cimahi =

Central Cimahi Kecamatan Cimahi Tengah
- District
- Interactive map of Central Cimahi
- Coordinates: 6°52′59″S 107°32′29″E
- Country: Indonesia
- Province: West Java
- City: Cimahi

Population (2014)
  - Total: 163,961
- Time zone: UTC+07.00 (WIB)
- Postal Code: 40521–40526

Central Cimahi is a district of Cimahi, West Java, Indonesia. Central Cimahi had a population of 163,961 in 2014.

== Villages ==
Central Cimahi is divided into six villages:

- Baros (40521)
- Central Cigugur (40522)
- Karangmeka (40523)
- Setiamanah (40524)
- Cimahi (40525)
- Padasuka (40526)
