= Kertajati International Airport =

Airport serving Bandung and Cirebon, West Java, Indonesia

Kertajati International Airport Bandar Udara Internasional Kertajati ᮘᮔ᮪ᮓᮁ ᮅᮓᮛ ᮄᮔ᮪ᮒᮨᮁᮔᮞᮤᮇᮔᮜ᮪ ᮊᮨᮁᮒᮏᮒᮤ

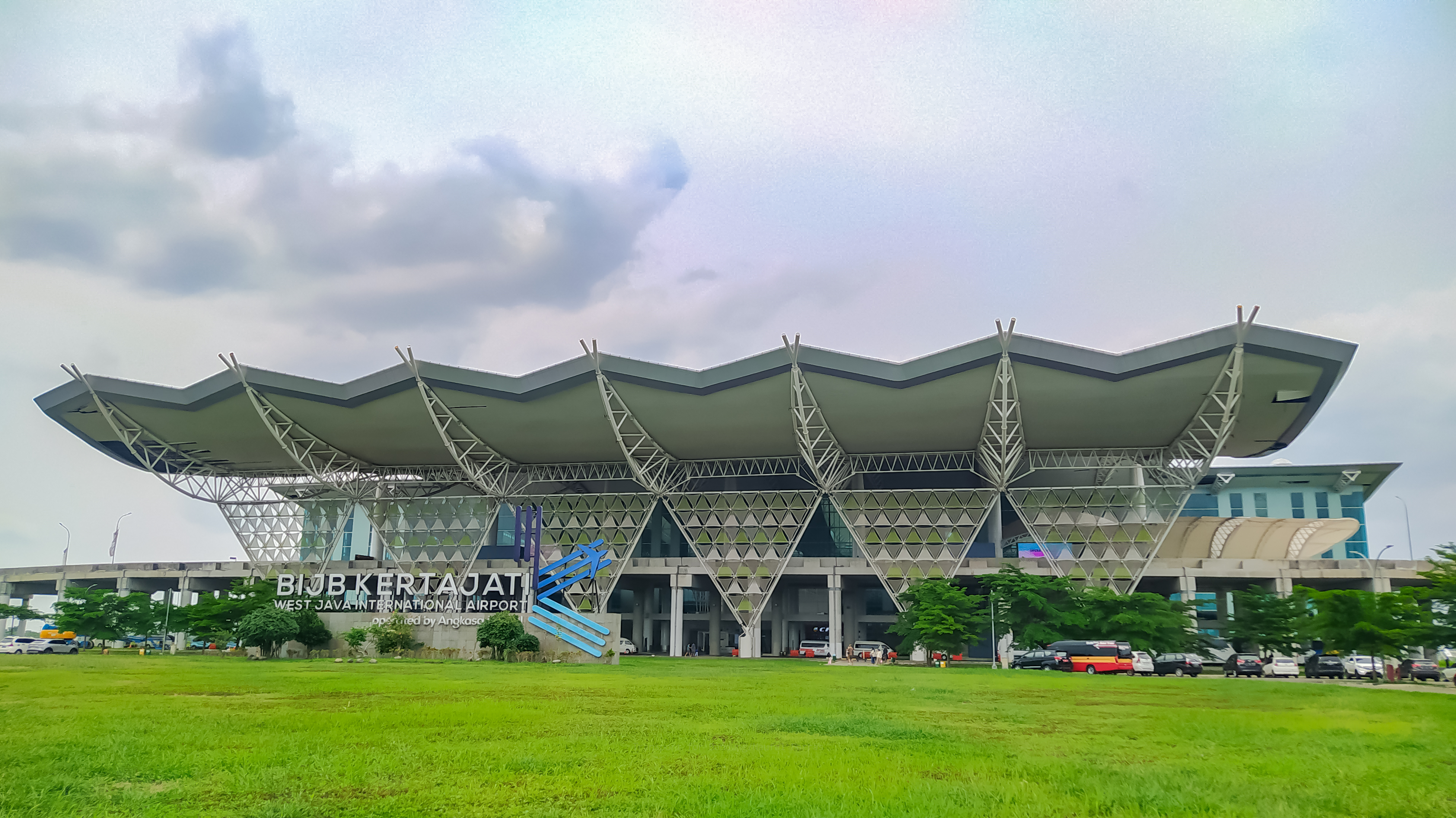
- IATA: KJT; ICAO: WICA

Summary
- Airport type: Public
- Owner: Provincial Government of West Java, Indonesia via PT Bandar Udara Internasional Jawa Barat
- Operator: InJourney Airports
- Serves: Greater Bandung; Cirebon; West Java; Western part of Central Java
- Location: Majalengka Regency, West Java, Indonesia
- Opened: Operational: 24 May 2018; 8 years ago; Official: 1 July 2019; 7 years ago
- Time zone: WIB (UTC+07:00)
- Elevation AMSL: 134 ft (41 m)
- Coordinates: 6°40′09″S 108°11′28″E
- Website: www.bijb.co.id

Map
- Location in Majalengka Regency Location in Java Location in Indonesia

Runways
| Direction | Length | | Surface |
| Direction | ft | m | Surface |
|---|---|---|---|
| 14/32 | 9,843 | 3,000 | Asphalt |

Statistics (2019)
- Passengers: 460,848 (July–December)

Kertajati International Airport (IATA: KJT, ICAO: WICA) is an international airport serving the Greater Bandung and Cirebon metropolitan areas, as well as parts of the West Java and Central Java provinces, Indonesia. It is the second largest airport in Indonesia by land area, after Soekarno–Hatta International Airport in Jakarta. Located in Majalengka Regency, the airport is approximately 68 kilometres (42 mi) northeast of Bandung city centre.

The airport began operations on 24 May 2018 when the Indonesia One presidential aircraft landed at the airport. A grand opening took place in July 2019. The new airport is supposed to function as a reliever airport for Soekarno Hatta, providing additional spillover capacity. Upon completion, the airport will have a total capacity of 29 million passengers annually, with additional space for expansion. The airport planned to operate cargo terminals with an official estimate of 1.5 million tons of cargo by 2020.

The airport was "mostly deserted" after opening, leading the government to mandate that all flights to Bandung must operate from the new airport.

== Development ==
In order to ensure completion of Kertajati Airport, construction of Karawang Airport has been put on hold and Kertajati was fast-tracked for completion. The 1,800 hectares airport is estimated to cost Rp 25.4 trillion. The plan includes three 60-meter-wide runways (measuring 3000, 3750 and 4025 meters) capable of accommodating large aircraft such as the Airbus A380, Boeing 747-8, Antonov and Airbus A350. The airport is also to be equipped with the technology needed to handle the most recent and modern aircraft, such as the Boeing 787. The project will include a 3,400-hectare aerotropolis known as Kertajati Aerocity. Twice the size of the airport, this aerotropolis is to be a center of economic growth and is located north of the Cipali Toll Road, east of the Manuk River.

Project implementation consists of Five Phases: Preparation (2015), Phase I (2015–2020), Phase I-II (2016–2025), and purpose Phase III and IV after 2025. During Phase I, the project focused on airport development. Phases I-II are Kertajati Aerocity development, Phase III will be the growth of Kertajati as aerotropolis, and as the final Phase, Kertajati Aerocity will act as an enabler of the sustainable economic center. Based on the strategic development plan, in addition to regular large passenger jet and cargo flights, the airport facilities have been optimized for Low Cost Carriers (LCC) and Hajj flights to Saudi Arabia. This will eventually shift Bandung and West Java passengers and traffic to Kertajati, alleviating congestion at Soekarno–Hatta International Airport.

The airport features a single runway with the apron capable of accommodating 22 aircraft. In April 2019, work extending the runway to 3,000 metres was completed, and wide bodies such as Boeing 747s have landed. And, in April 2026, three Boeing 787 Dreamliners of Korean Air, EVA Air, and XiamenAir were diverted to Kertajati International Airport from Soekarno–Hatta International Airport due to bad weather in Jakarta successfully landed perfectly at Kertajati Airport, even though some people who were spotting witnessed the landing. It seemed that when the 787 landed, it stopped far away and took off and almost ate the runway.

On 11 July 2023, Indonesian President Joko Widodo announced that Husein Sastranegara Airport will be retired and all commercial flights will be moved to Kertajati starting October 2023 when it is fully operational. However, as of December 2024, the airport continues to serve some commercial flights.

== Terminal ==
Initially, the terminal area was 121,000 square metres (1,302,433 sq ft) and included two concourses with domestic and international gates, handling 11 million passengers a year. As construction proceeds, the terminal was to expand to 209,151 square metres (2,251,283 sq ft), with a passenger capacity of 30 million passengers per year by 2019, with plenty of space left over for phase II expansion. Citilink was the first airline to obtain permission to fly the Kertajati-Juanda route, starting in June 2018 and using an Airbus A320 aircraft.

== Airlines and destinations ==
=== Passenger ===
| Airlines | Destinations |
|---|---|
| Saudia | Seasonal: Jeddah |
| Scoot | Singapore |

=== Cargo ===
| Airlines | Destinations |
|---|---|
| Asia Cargo Airlines | Pekanbaru |

== Statistics ==
Frequency of flights at KJT
| Rank | Destinations | Frequency (weekly) | Airline(s) |
|---|---|---|---|
| 1 | (Singapore) Changi Airport | 2 | Scoot |

== Ground transportation ==
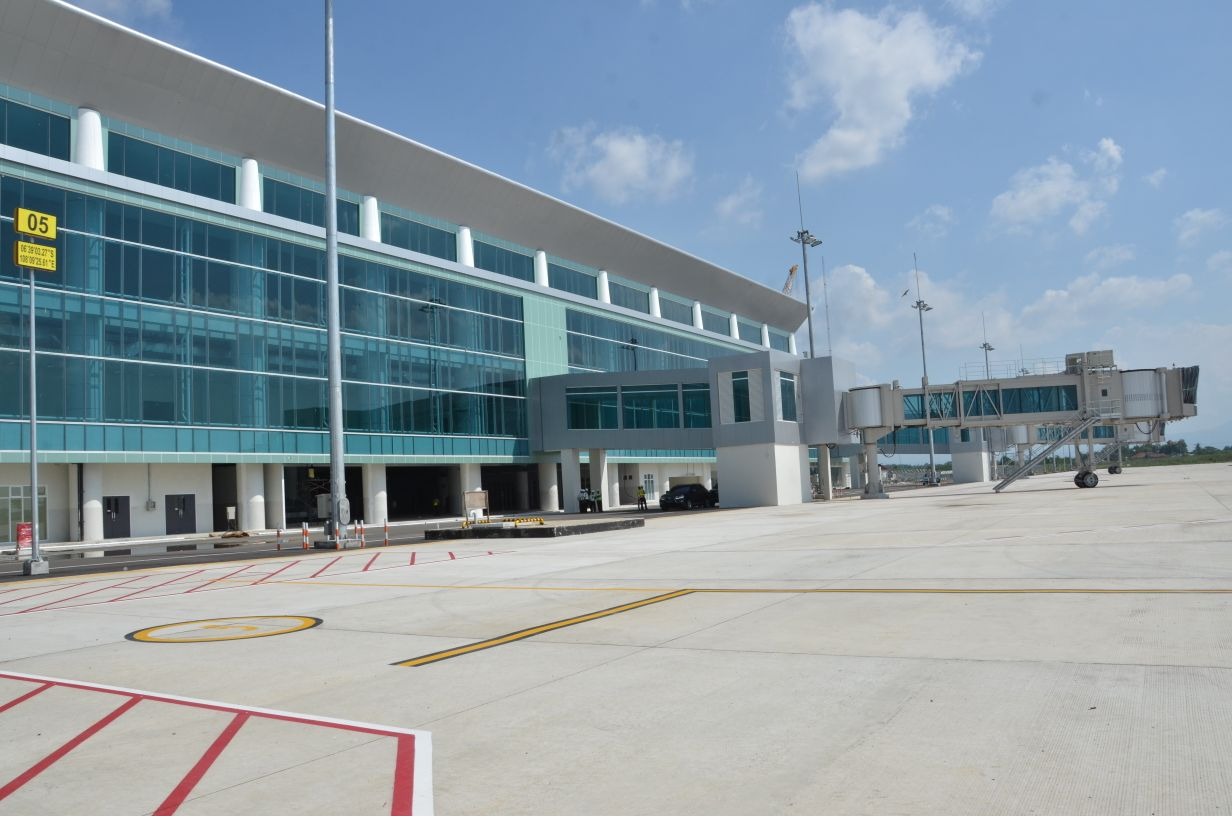
Terminal

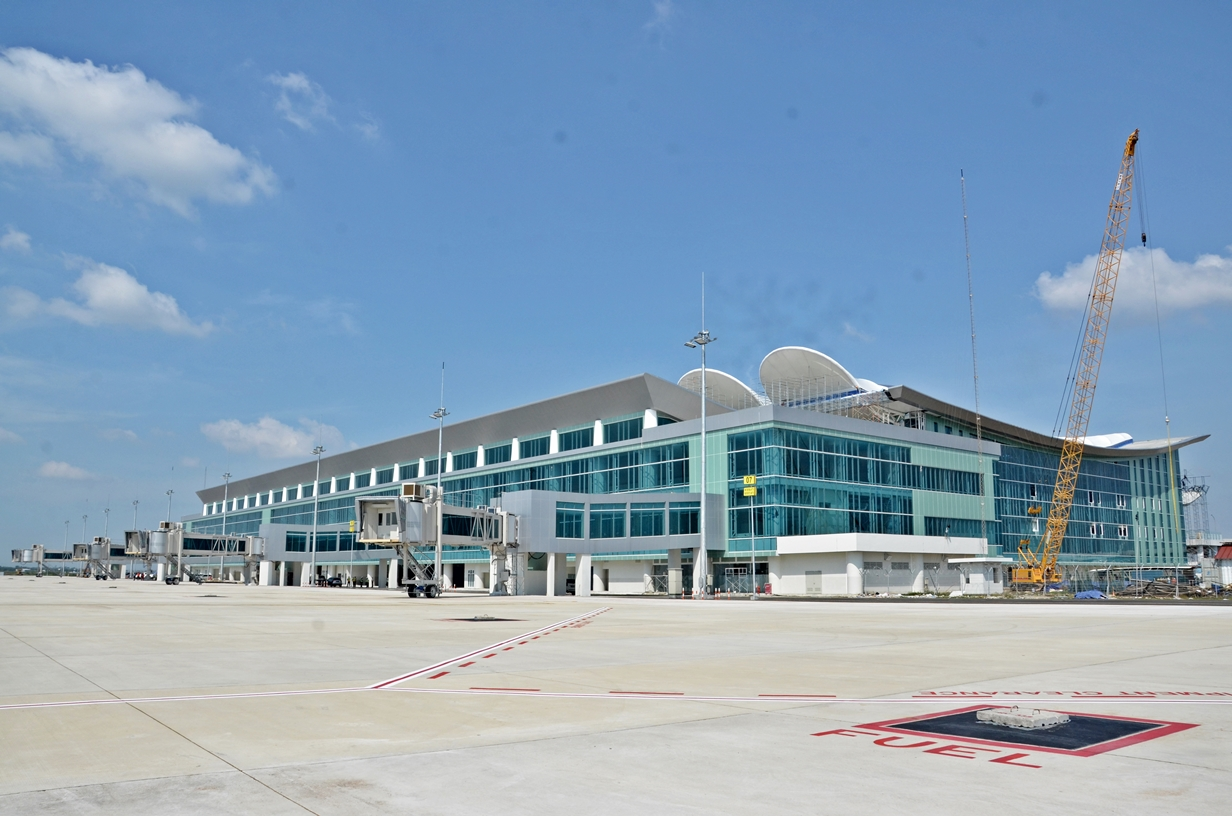
Terminal under construction

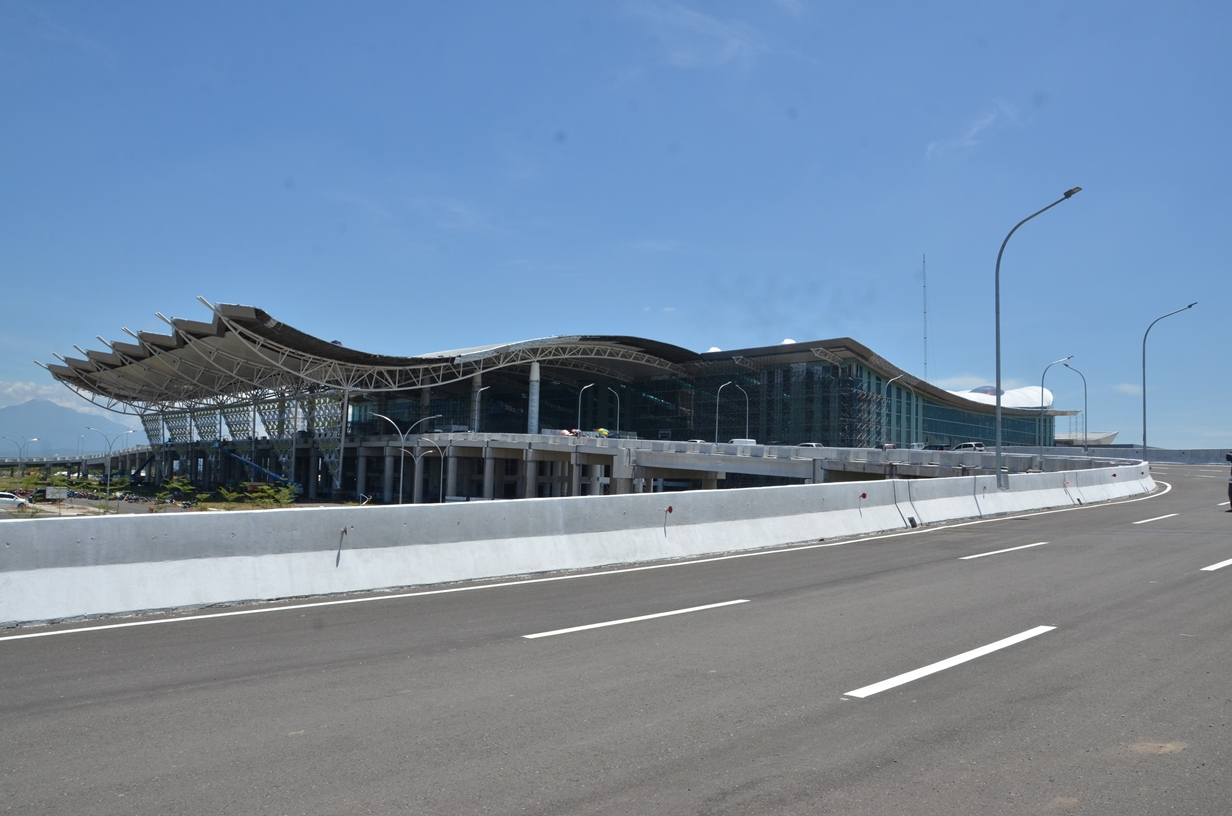
Terminal under construction

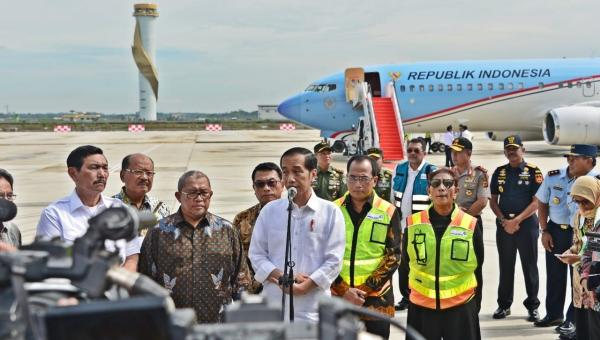
Former Indonesian President Joko Widodo arrived at Kertajati International Airport and gave a speech on 24 May 2018.

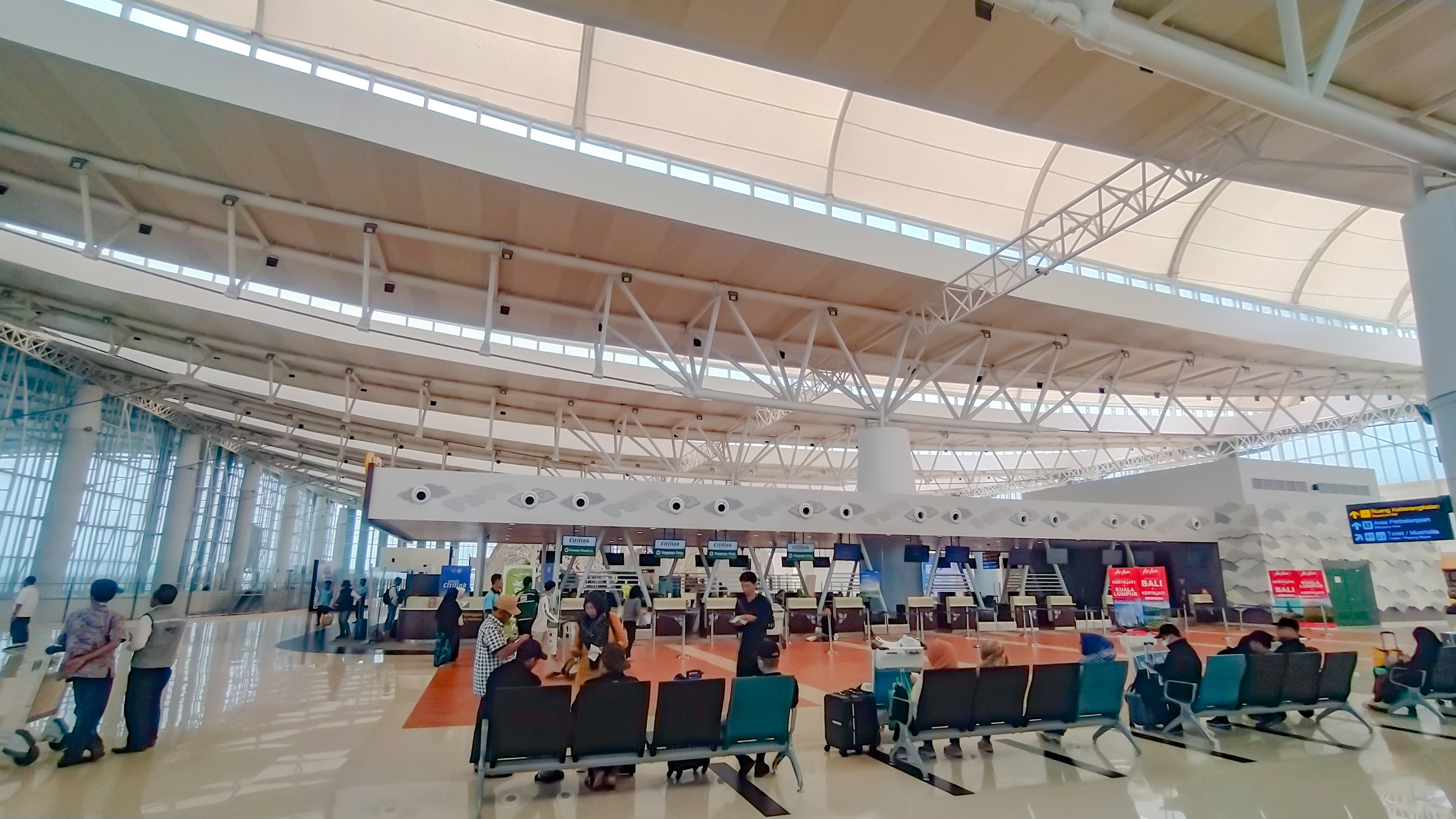
Inside of the terminal

Several bus companies, including Perum DAMRI and private operators provide services from the airport to various destinations of West Java roundtrip.

Service:

- CTU Shuttl4: Bandung, Tasikmalaya
- Damri: Bandung, Cirebon, Cikarang, Kuningan
- LINTAS Shuttle: Bandung,
- ECA Shuttle: Bandung, Kuningan, Indramayu
- Bhinneka Shuttle: Bandung, Cirebon
- P-Trans: Purwakarta
- Arnes: Majalengka, Sumedang
- BJT: Cirebon
- Budiman: Tasikmalaya
- Baraya: Bandung
- Mekarsari: Majalengka

The central government is currently providing a transportation subsidy by operating free Damri buses for one year, from Karawang, Cirebon and Bandung. The airport can be accessed by Cisumdawu Toll Road, which was completed in 2023. The airport is also connected to Cikopo-Palimanan Toll Road with an extension.

Train routes of Bandung-Garut and Cianjur-Bandung will also be forwarded to Kertajati Airport for accessibility support. Although still pushing for high speed rail project that will extend from Bandung to the airport, PT Bandara Internasional Jawa Barat (BIJB), and Railink have signed an MOU to build rail tracks and airport train system, when necessary.

== Criticism ==
During the soft opening, the airport suffered from mismanagement owing to lack of passengers utilizing the airport. Vice President Jusuf Kalla also criticized the local authorities for not doing proper research when developing the airport. Similarly, the Indonesian Ombudsman criticized failures and lack of effort by the airport company, BIJB in consulting airlines when developing the airport. Poor occupancy caused Indonesia's national airline Garuda Indonesia to eventually pull out of the airport in September 2019.

On 1 July 2019, all domestic flights from Husein Sastranegara Airport (located within the city of Bandung) were diverted to Kertajati Airport. Many passengers and airlines complained that the airport was too far from the city of Bandung that it served. The diversion of all domestic flights from Husein to Kertajati was also criticized as being too soon. Prior to the completion of the Cisumdawu Toll Road, access to the airport to and from Bandung was inconvenient and poor. These factors caused domestic visitors from outside of Java to shun Bandung, resulting in a decline of hotel and restaurant revenue in the city. Many domestic flights to Kertajati were returned to Husein on 20 August 2020. All domestic operation ceased on 2 June 2025.
