= Soreang =

- District

Regional transcription(s)
  - Sundanese: ᮞᮧᮛᮦᮃᮀ
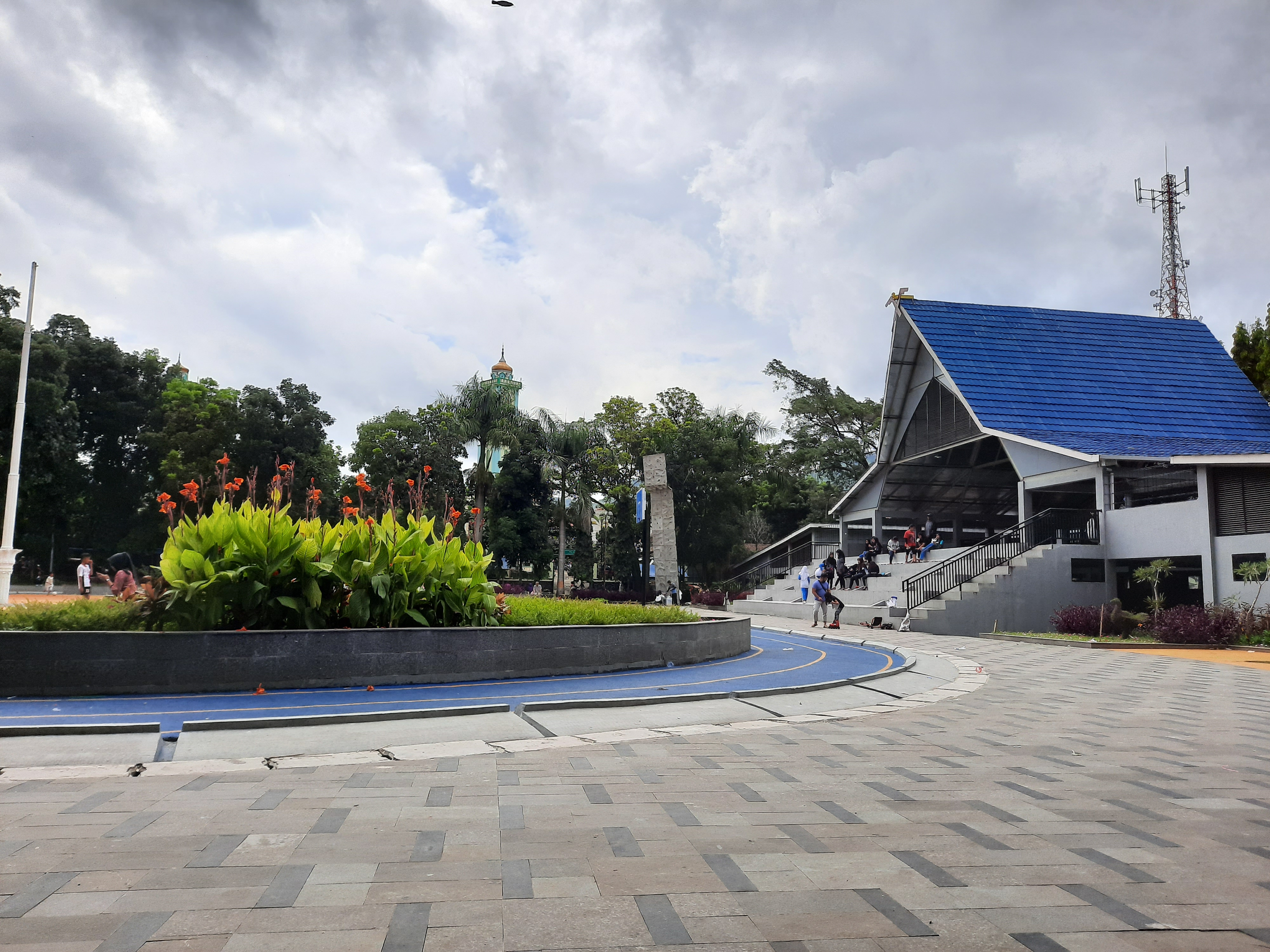
- Alun-alun Soreang (Soreang main square)

- Location in Java and Indonesia Soreang (Indonesia)
- Coordinates: 7°2′14″S 107°31′0″E
- Country: Indonesia
- Province: West Java
- Regency: Bandung Regency

Government
  - Camat: Rusli Baijuri
  - Secretary: Ahmad Kurtubi

Area
  - Total: 25.05 km^{2} (9.67 sq mi)
- Elevation: 725 m (2,379 ft)

Population (mid 2024 estimate)
  - Total: 124,049
  - Density: 4,952/km^{2} (12,830/sq mi)
- Time zone: UTC+7 (IWT)
- Postal code: 4091x
- Area code: (+62) 22
- Villages: 10
- Website: Official website

Soreang (Sundanese: ᮞᮧᮛᮦᮃᮀ) is a town and an administrative district (kecamatan) of Bandung Regency, West Java, Indonesia. Located 18 km from Bandung city, Soreang is the regency seat of Bandung Regency, where the regent's office and local legislature are located at Kopo-Soreang Highway.

== Transportation ==
Soreang is a transportation hub for the southern parts of the regency. In the colonial times, there used to be a railway connecting Bandung and Ciwidey, but was discontinued in 1982 following a collapse of the track in 1972.

A toll road connecting the city of Bandung and Soreang directly was opened in December 2017, reducing travel time to around 10 minutes from previously up to 2 hours.

=== Toll Road Access ===
KM	Toll Road	Destination
135	Purbaleunyi Toll Road	Kopo, Soreang
0	Soreang-Pasir Koja Toll Road	Soreang

== Administrative divisions ==
Soreang District is divided into the following ten administrative villages (desa), listed below with their areas and populations as at mid 2024, and their post codes.

Kode wilayah	Village	Area in km^{2}	Population estimate mid 2024	Post code
32.04.37.2002	Sadu	2.39	11,222	40913
32.04.37.2010	Sukajadi	5.43	9,154	40911
32.04.37.2018	Sukanagara	3.79	6,879	40911
32.04.37.2004	Panyirapan	1.71	8,491	40915
32.04.37.2017	Karamatmulya	2.25	9,295	40914
32.04.37.2001	Soreang (village)	2.54	21,567	40911
32.04.37.2011	Pamekaran	1.65	14,250	40912
32.04.37.2020	Parungserab	1.81	9,359	40914
32.04.37.2021	Sekarwangi	1.29	9,154	40914
32.04.37.2019	Cingcin	2.18	24,678	40914
	Totals	25.05	124,049	

== Climate ==
Soreang has a tropical rainforest climate (Af) with moderate rainfall from June to September and heavy rainfall from October to May.

Climate data for Soreang
Month	Jan	Feb	Mar	Apr	May	Jun	Jul	Aug	Sep	Oct	Nov	Dec	Year
Mean daily maximum °C (°F)	26.9 (80.4)	27.2 (81.0)	27.7 (81.9)	28.1 (82.6)	28.1 (82.6)	27.7 (81.9)	27.6 (81.7)	28.1 (82.6)	28.8 (83.8)	28.8 (83.8)	28.0 (82.4)	27.6 (81.7)	27.9 (82.2)
Daily mean °C (°F)	22.9 (73.2)	23.0 (73.4)	23.3 (73.9)	23.5 (74.3)	23.4 (74.1)	22.5 (72.5)	22.2 (72.0)	22.3 (72.1)	23.0 (73.4)	23.4 (74.1)	23.2 (73.8)	23.3 (73.9)	23.0 (73.4)
Mean daily minimum °C (°F)	19.0 (66.2)	18.9 (66.0)	18.9 (66.0)	19.0 (66.2)	18.7 (65.7)	17.3 (63.1)	16.8 (62.2)	16.6 (61.9)	17.2 (63.0)	18.1 (64.6)	18.5 (65.3)	19.0 (66.2)	18.2 (64.7)
Average rainfall mm (inches)	246 (9.7)	219 (8.6)	266 (10.5)	262 (10.3)	179 (7.0)	87 (3.4)	80 (3.1)	82 (3.2)	95 (3.7)	198 (7.8)	284 (11.2)	298 (11.7)	2,296 (90.2)
Source: Climate-Data.org

== See also ==
- Greater Bandung
- Soreang-Pasir Koja Toll Road
