= Purwakarta Regency =

Regency in West Java, Indonesia

Purwakarta Regency Kabupaten Purwakarta
- Regency

Other transcription(s)
  - Sundanese: ᮊᮘᮥᮕᮒᮦᮔ᮪ ᮕᮥᮁᮝᮊᮁᮒ
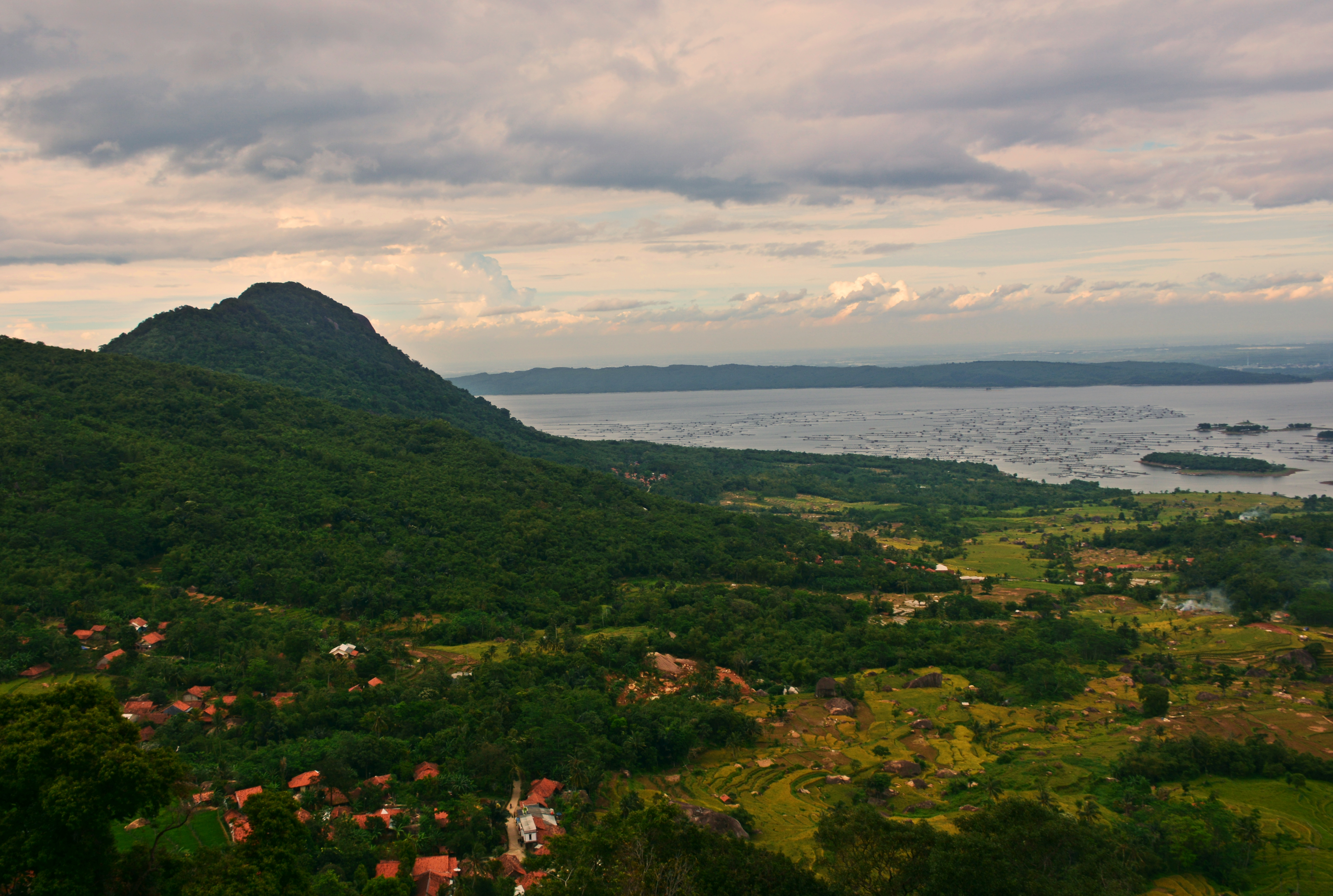
- Jatiluhur Dam

- Coat of arms
- Motto: Wibawa Karta Raharja
- Location within West Java

- Location in Java and Indonesia Purwakarta Regency (Indonesia)
- Coordinates: 6°33′22″S 107°26′32″E
- Country: Indonesia
- Province: West Java

Government
  - Regent: Saepul Bahri Binzein
  - Vice Regent: Abang Ijo Hapidin

Area
  - Total: 971.72 km^{2} (375.18 sq mi)

Population (mid 2026 estimate)
  - Total: 1,075,243
  - Density: 1,106.5/km^{2} (2,865.9/sq mi)
- Time zone: UTC+07:00 (WIB)
- Area code: 0264
- HDI: ▲0.678 (Medium)
- Website: purwakartakab.go.id

Purwakarta Regency (Sundanese: ᮕᮥᮁᮝᮊᮁᮒ) is a district area located in the Province of West Java, Indonesia. The administrative capital is the large town of Purwakarta, which is approximately 80 km southeast of Jakarta and 44 km northwest of Bandung. This district borders Karawang Regency in the west and Subang Regency in the east, while to the south it borders West Bandung Regency and Cianjur Regency.

The land area of the Regency is 971.72 km2, and it had a population of 852,521 in the 2010 Census and 997,869 in the 2020 Census, while the official estimate as projected for mid 2026 was 1,075,243 (comprising 544,524 males and 530,719 females) - for a density of 1,067.2 people per km^{2}. The west of the regency includes the huge reservoir of the Waduk Jatiluhur (which forms a freshwater lake with a surface area of 83 km^{2}), west of Purwakarta town and 70 km from Jakarta, created by the Jatiluhur Dam on the Tarum River.

== Administrative districts ==
The Purwakarta Regency is divided into seventeen districts (kecamatan), listed below with their areas and their populations at the 2010 Census and 2020 Census, together with the official estimates as projected for mid 2026. The table also gives the locations of the district administrative centres, the number of administrative villages in each district (totaling 183 rural desa and 9 urban kelurahan - the latter are 9 of the 10 villages in Purwakarta (town) District), and its post code.

| Kode Wilayah | Name of District (kecamatan) | Area in sq. km | Pop'n 2010 Census | Pop'n 2020 Census | Pop'n mid 2026 Estimate | Admin centre | No. of villages | Post code |
|---|---|---|---|---|---|---|---|---|
| 32.14.03 | Jatiluhur | 60.11 | 61,931 | 73,953 | 80,410 | Jatiluhur | 10 | 41152 - 41161 |
| 32.14.15 | Sukasari ^{(a)} | 92.01 | 14,455 | 17,258 | 18,760 | Kertamanah | 5 | 41116 |
| 32.14.07 | Maniis | 71.64 | 31,205 | 36,052 | 38,580 | Citamiang | 8 | 41166 |
| 32.14.08 | Tegalwaru | 73.23 | 44,160 | 53,184 | 58,060 | Sukahaji | 13 | 41165 |
| 32.14.04 | Plered | 31.48 | 71,099 | 83,425 | 89,940 | Plered | 16 | 41162 |
| 32.14.05 | Sukatani | 95.43 | 63,730 | 76,907 | 84,040 | Sukatani | 14 | 41167 |
| 32.14.06 | Darangdan | 67.39 | 59,705 | 70,894 | 76,870 | Darangdan | 15 | 41163 |
| 32.14.11 | Bojong | 68.69 | 44,757 | 52,998 | 57,390 | Sukamanah | 14 | 41164 |
| 32.14.09 | Wanayasa | 56.55 | 38,921 | 43,303 | 45,500 | Wanayasa | 15 | 41174 |
| 32.14.17 | Kiarapedes | 52.16 | 23,594 | 28,387 | 30,980 | Kiarapedes | 10 | 41175 |
| 32.14.10 | Pasawahan | 36.96 | 40,518 | 49,458 | 54,350 | Sawah Kulon | 12 | 41171 & 41172 |
| 32.14.16 | Pondoksalam | 44.08 | 26,329 | 30,734 | 33,050 | Salammulya | 11 | 41115 |
| 32.14.01 | Purwakarta (town) | 24.83 | 165,447 | 179,233 | 185,900 | Nagri Kaler | 10 ^{(b)} | 41111 - 41119 |
| 32.14.12 | Babakancikao | 42.40 | 47,476 | 59,909 | 66,900 | Babakancikao Desa | 9 | 41151 |
| 32.14.02 | Campaka | 43.60 | 40,907 | 50,342 | 55,540 | Campaka | 10 | 41180 |
| 32.14.14 | Cibatu | 56.50 | 26,989 | 31,267 | 33,500 | Cibatu | 10 | 41182 |
| 32.14.13 | Bungursari | 54.66 | 51,298 | 60,565 | 65,490 | Bungursari | 10 | 41181 |
| | Totals | 971.72 | 852,521 | 997,869 | 1,075,243 | Purwakarta | 192 | |

Note: (a) Sukasari District lies to the west and north of the vast Waduk Jatiluhur Reservoir, which largely separates it from the rest of the regency.
(b) comprising the 9 kelurahan (Cipaisan, Ciseureuh, Purwamekar, Munjuljaya, Nagrikaler, Nagrikidul, Nagritengah, Sindangkasih and Tegalmunjul), plus one desa.

== Toll Road Access ==
| KM | Toll Road | Destination |
| 72 | Japek Toll Road | Cikampek, Purwakarta, Bungursari |
|---|---|---|
| 76 | Cipularang Toll Road | Sadang, Purwakarta, Subang |
| 84 | Cipularang Toll Road | Jatiluhur, Purwakarta, Ciganea |

== Harmoni Award 2016 ==
The Ministry of Religion has awarded a Harmoni Award in 2016 to Purwakarta Regency for religion tolerance in this area. It is one of the only ten such awards across Indonesia. West Java Province is categorized by the Setara Institute as the best for tolerance in Indonesia, although West Java Province itself has not received an award.
