= Subang, Subang =

Subang
- District

Regional transcription(s)
  - Sundanese: ᮞᮥᮘᮀ
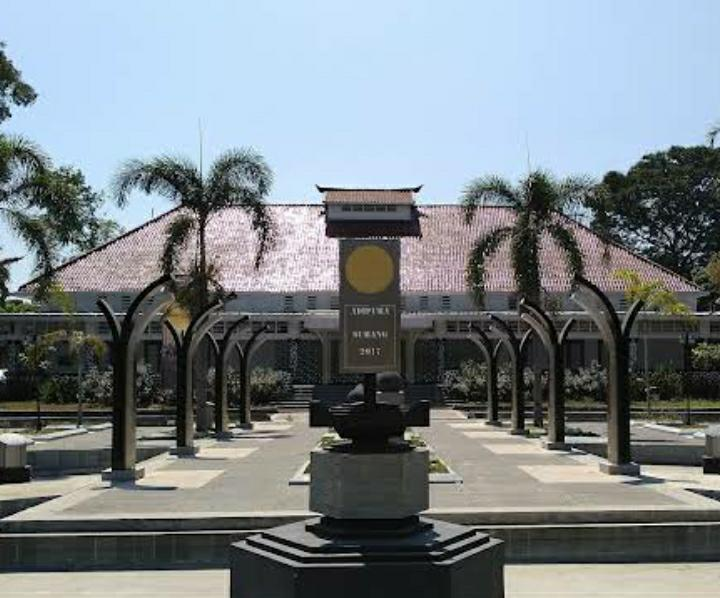
- Wisma Karya is a historic building in Subang town.

- Location in Java and Indonesia Subang (Indonesia)
- Coordinates: 6°34′17″S 107°45′41″E
- Country: Indonesia
- Province: West Java
- Regency: Subang Regency

Government
  - Camat: Deni Setiawan

Area
  - Total: 60.22 km^{2} (23.25 sq mi)
- Elevation: 88 m (289 ft)

Population (mid 2024 estimate)
  - Total: 144,658
  - Density: 2,402/km^{2} (6,222/sq mi)
- Time zone: UTC+7 (IWT)
- Postal code: 4121x
- Area code: (+62) 260
- Villages: 12
- Website: Official website

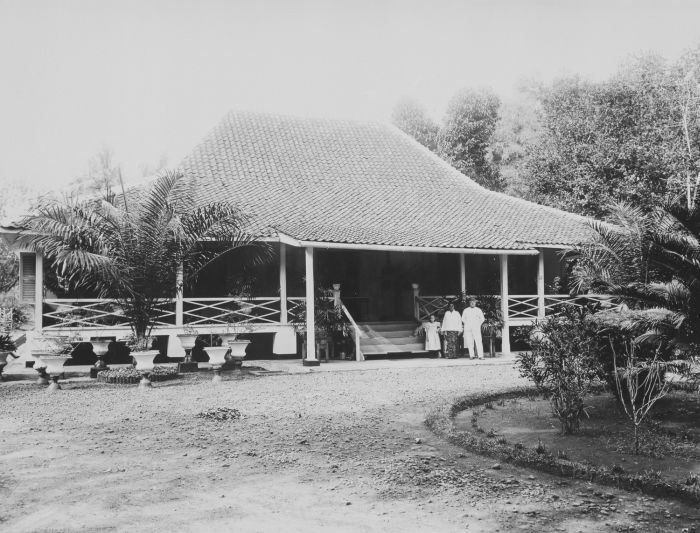
Residence of a Dutch plantation manager in Subang (1930's)

Subang is a town and the capital of the Subang Regency in West Java, Indonesia. It lies approximately 125 kilometres (78 mi) southeast of Jakarta and 54 kilometres (34 mi) northeast of Bandung by road. The district had a population of 120,346 in 2010 which grew to 137,284 at the 2020 Census; the official estimate as at mid 2024 was 144,658 (comprising 72,262 males and 72,396 females).

== History ==
In April 1952 the Harian Rakjat stated that the Communist Party of Indonesia had organized a course in Subang along with Karawang.

== Landmarks ==
The government office Dinas Kesehatan Kabupaten Subang, the House of Representatives of Subang District, the park Alun Alun Kabupaten Subang, and Al-Musabaqoh Grand Mosque are in the town centre. The University of Subang is in the southeast and the football pitch Stadion Persikas lies in the south of the town. P. T. Taekwung Industrial Estate lies on the northeastern outskirts of the town as does a Class II prison in the north. The principal hospital is Rumah Sakit PTPN VIII Hospital.

The Wisma Karya Museum is a colonial period building and museum in Subang. It contains a range of items from ancient fossils to a bronze statue of P.W. Hofland, which was made in 1878.

== Administration ==
The district is composed of eight administrative urban villages (kelurahan), listed below with their areas together with the official estimates as of mid-2024. The table also includes the post codes.

Kode Wilayah	Name of District (kecamatan)	Area in km^{2}	Pop'n estimate mid 2024	Post code
32.13.03.1001	Parung	9.00	10,285	41211
32.13.03.1003	Pasirkareumbi	5.94	17,866	41211
32.13.03.1005	Soklat	2.95	17,070	41215
32.13.03.1004	Karanganyar	3.42	27,305	41211
32.13.03.1002	Cigadung	4.91	26,658	41213
32.13.03.1007	Dangdeur	9.85	19,340	41212
32.13.03.1006	Sukamelang	6.92	18,668	41211
32.13.03.1008	Wanareja	17.23	7,466	41211
	Totals	60.22	144,658	

== Climate ==
Subang has a borderline tropical rainforest climate (Af) and tropical monsoon climate (Am) with exactly 60 millimetres (2.4 in) in the driest month, August. It has moderate rainfall from June to September and heavy to very heavy rainfall from October to May.

Climate data for Subang
Month	Jan	Feb	Mar	Apr	May	Jun	Jul	Aug	Sep	Oct	Nov	Dec	Year
Mean daily maximum °C (°F)	30.2 (86.4)	30.3 (86.5)	30.8 (87.4)	31.5 (88.7)	31.8 (89.2)	31.7 (89.1)	31.8 (89.2)	32.5 (90.5)	33.1 (91.6)	33.2 (91.8)	32.0 (89.6)	31.1 (88.0)	31.7 (89.0)
Daily mean °C (°F)	26.1 (79.0)	26.2 (79.2)	26.4 (79.5)	26.9 (80.4)	27.0 (80.6)	26.5 (79.7)	26.4 (79.5)	26.8 (80.2)	27.2 (81.0)	27.4 (81.3)	27.0 (80.6)	26.6 (79.9)	26.7 (80.1)
Mean daily minimum °C (°F)	22.1 (71.8)	22.1 (71.8)	22.1 (71.8)	22.3 (72.1)	22.2 (72.0)	21.4 (70.5)	21.1 (70.0)	21.1 (70.0)	21.3 (70.3)	21.7 (71.1)	22.1 (71.8)	22.2 (72.0)	21.8 (71.3)
Average rainfall mm (inches)	468 (18.4)	398 (15.7)	411 (16.2)	325 (12.8)	237 (9.3)	118 (4.6)	94 (3.7)	60 (2.4)	70 (2.8)	166 (6.5)	304 (12.0)	398 (15.7)	3,049 (120.1)
Source: Climate-Data.org
