= North Coast Road (Java) =

Road in Indonesia

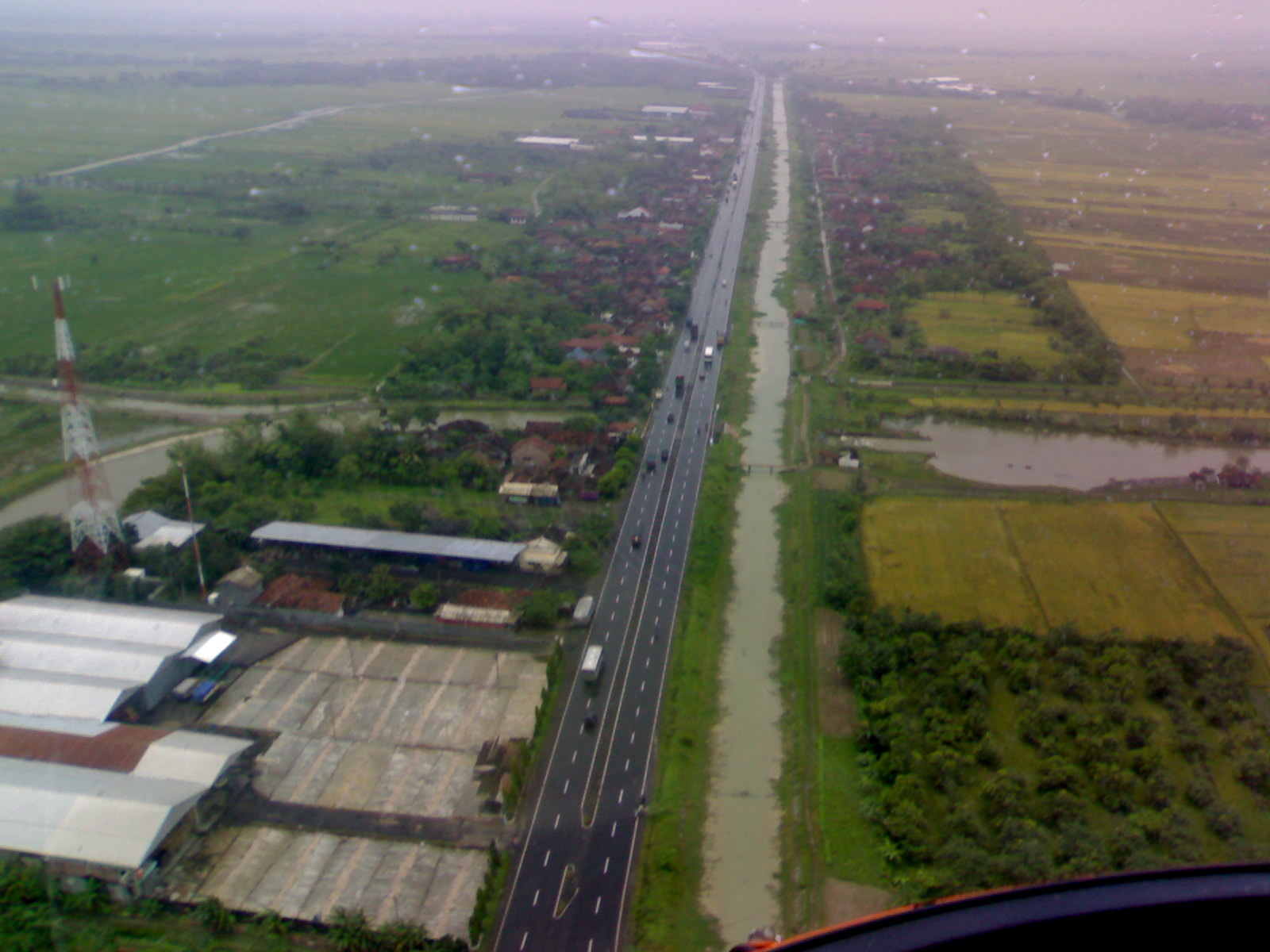
Part of Java North Coast highway aerial view.

The North Coast Road (Indonesian: Jalur Pantai Utara (Jalur Pantura)) is a 1,430-kilometre (889-mile) road, that connects Cilegon and Banyuwangi along the northern coast of Java, particularly between Jakarta and Surabaya.

Most of Java's north coast road was built during the reign of governor-general Herman Willem Daendels (1808–1811) and was originally known as the Great Post Road (Indonesian: Jalan Raya Pos Dutch: De Grote Postweg).

== History of construction ==
The Great Post Road was a military road which was built under the order of King Lodewijk Napoleon who ruled the Kingdom of Holland at that time. The road was intended to ease military support, e.g. transfer of soldiers, in order to defend Java from a possible British invasion. It connects Anyer in its western end and Panarukan in the eastern end of Java. After the reign of Daendels, the eastern road was later extended to Banyuwangi. The Java Great Post Road consists of most of the present Java North Coast Road. However, the original post road runs through the Preanger (Priangan, West Java) highlands, from Meester Cornelis (Jatinegara) going south to Buitenzorg (Bogor), and going east to Cianjur, Bandung, Sumedang, and Cirebon. The current north coast road runs through coastal northern West Java which was built later after the construction of Daendels' post road. It connects Bekasi, Karawang, Pamanukan, and Cirebon.

Most of the current national road network in Java was built during the Dutch East Indies era. However, during the Suharto era around the 1980s, the toll road network system was introduced within the Java transportation network. The Java toll network highway has been continuously expanded, and today some of these toll roads forms Java north coast road.

== Extent ==
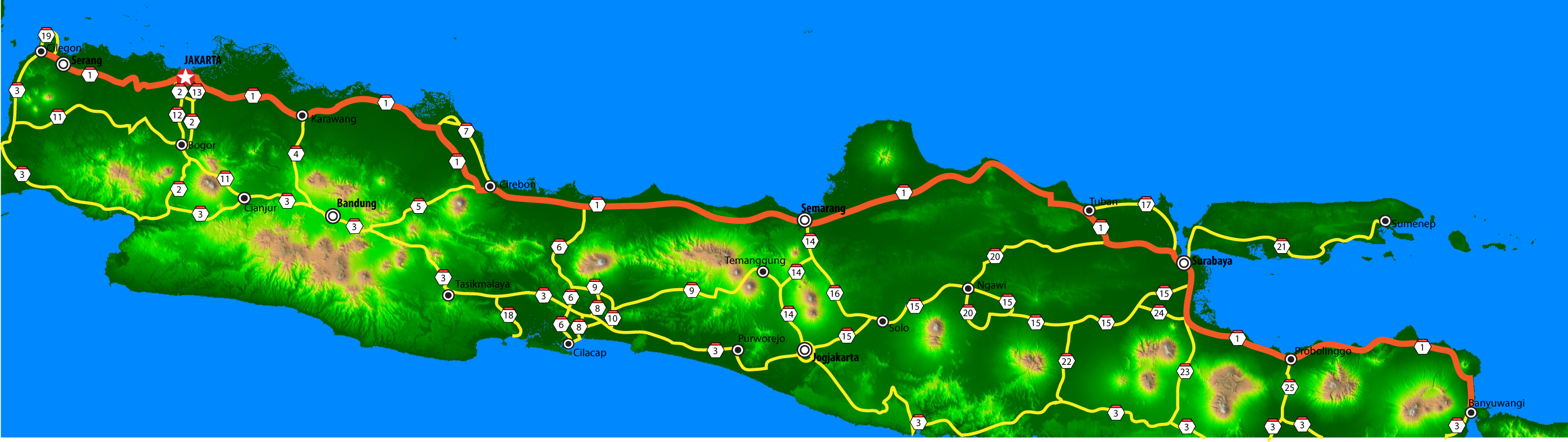
Java's North Coast Road

As the Great Post Road, it originally ran from Anyer in the west of Java to Panarukan in the east, but was later extended to Banyuwangi. In its current form the North Coast Road runs through five provinces: Banten, DKI Jakarta, West Java, Central Java and East Java. The port of Merak forms the western terminus, connecting with Bakauheni in Sumatra, the southern end of the Trans-Sumatran Highway. The eastern end is situated at Ketapang with connections to Gilimanuk in Bali. Sections of the North Coast Road are going to be part of the 13,177 km AH2 route of the Asian Highway Network route, which links Denpasar, Bali with Khosravi, Iran, since some of the AH2 is still under construction. AH2 is a freeway limited to vehicles having at least 4 wheels. The North Coast Road also comprises National 1, which is open to any vehicle.

== Cities ==
The road connects the largest cities in Java, including Jakarta, Cilegon, Tangerang, Bekasi, Cirebon, Tegal, Pekalongan, Semarang, Rembang, Tuban, Surabaya, Pasuruan, Probolinggo and Banyuwangi.

== Toll roads ==
Toll roads network of Java (2025)

The traffic of North Coast Road is gradually easing by the Trans-Java toll road and its complement toll roads.

- Tangerang–Merak Toll Road (Banten)
- Jakarta–Tangerang Toll Road (Banten)
- Jakarta Outer Ring Road (DKI Jakarta)
- Jakarta–Cikampek Toll Road (West Java)
- Cikopo–Palimanan Toll Road (West Java)
- Palimanan–Kanci Toll Road (West Java)
- Kanci–Pejagan Toll Road (Central Java)
- Pejagan–Pemalang Toll Road (Central Java)
- Pemalang–Batang Toll Road (Central Java)
- Batang–Semarang Toll Road (Central Java)
- Semarang Toll Road (Central Java)
- Semarang–Solo Toll Road (Central Java)
- Solo–Kertosono Toll Road (Central Java)
- Kertosono–Mojokerto Toll Road (East Java)
- Surabaya–Mojokerto Toll Road (East Java)
- Surabaya–Gempol Toll Road (East Java)
- Gempol–Pasuruan Toll Road (East Java)
- Pasuruan–Probolinggo Toll Road (East Java)
- Probolinggo–Banyuwangi Toll Road (East Java)

== Volume and hazards ==
This road is a major route for land transportation, being used by a range of 20,000 to 70,000 vehicles daily. The state of the road varies in condition, which can seriously affect traffic-flow.

The North Coast Road is a major artery during the celebration of the Lebaran holiday, where transit is primarily west to east.
