= Trans-Java Toll Road =

Toll road network in Java, Indonesia

- Jalan Tol Trans Jawa
- Main route of Trans Java Toll Road

- Trans-Java Toll Road interconnections (2025)

Route information
- Part of AH2; Merak, Jakarta, Cikampek, Cirebon, Tegal, Semarang, Solo, Surabaya, Banyuwangi
- Maintained by PT Jasamarga Transjawa Tol
- Length: 1,167 km (725 mi)
- Existed: 1983–present
- History: 1983 (Semarang Ring Road section completed); 1984 (Jakarta-Tangerang section completed); 1986 (Surabaya-Gempol section completed); 1988 (Jakarta-Cikampek section completed); 1992 (Tangerang-Merak section completed); 1998 (Palimanan-Kanci section completed); 2010 (Kanci-Pejagan section completed); 2015 (Cikampek-Palimanan section completed); 2017 (Mojokerto-Surabaya section completed); 2018 (Pejagan-Semarang, Semarang-Mojokerto, Surabaya-Pasuruan section completed); 2019 (Pasuruan-Probolinggo section completed); TBA (Probolinggo-Banyuwangi planned completion)

Major junctions
- West end: Merak
- Serang–Panimbang Toll Road; Jagorawi Toll Road; Jakarta Inner Ring Road; Jakarta Outer Ring Road; Jakarta Outer Ring Road 2; Cipularang Toll Road; Cisumdawu Toll Road; Semarang–Demak Toll Road; KLBM Toll Road; Surabaya–Gresik Toll Road; Waru–Juanda Toll Road; Gempol–Malang Toll Road
- East end: Banyuwangi

Location
- Country: Indonesia
- Provinces: Banten, West Java, Central Java, East Java
- Major cities: Cilegon, Serang, Tangerang, Jakarta, Bekasi, Karawang, Subang, Indramayu, Majalengka, Cirebon, Brebes, Tegal, Pemalang, Pekalongan, Batang, Kendal, Semarang, Salatiga, Boyolali, Solo, Sragen, Ngawi, Madiun, Nganjuk, Jombang, Mojokerto, Surabaya, Sidoarjo, Pasuruan, Probolinggo, Situbondo, Banyuwangi

Highway system
- Transport in Indonesia

The Trans-Java Toll Road (Indonesian: Jalan Tol Trans-Jawa) is a tolled expressway network in the island of Java, Indonesia, runs from Port of Merak in Cilegon, the main link between the island of Sumatra and Java, to Banyuwangi, the eastern end of the island in Indonesia and the main link between the island of Java and Bali. It mainly runs through the northern coast of the island, except for the section between Semarang and Surabaya, where it runs through the centre and south of the island. It runs through five of the six provinces on the island of Java (DI Yogyakarta being the sole exception), connecting the major cities of Jakarta, Cirebon, Semarang, Solo, and Surabaya. The toll road is the land transportation backbone of the island and is the most important toll road network of the country. The toll road has a total length of 1,167 kilometres (725 mi).

The Trans-Jawa toll network was first conceived in whole in 1995, by President Soeharto as a means to connect both ends of the island to help with distribution and general traffic between the major cities that it runs through. But, the 1997 Asian financial crisis which affected the country, halted any developments. The project was later revived by President Joko Widodo, with the construction of the remaining sections starting between 2014 and 2016. This revival is mainly due to the main Pantura road getting increasingly congested, especially during the Eid and Christmas seasons.

Several sections of the toll road were completed in December 2018, fully connecting the sections between Port of Merak and Surabaya. Meanwhile, the section connecting Surabaya and Probolinggo was completed a year later. As of 2023, the section between Probolinggo and Banyuwangi had its ground breaking with targeted completion date of 2025.

There are also many other complementary toll networks connecting this toll road. Trans-Java toll road is part of Asian Highway 2, which extends from Denpasar, Indonesia to Khosravi, Iran.

== History ==
During the Dutch colonial era, the colonial government ordered Governor-General Herman Willem Daendels to build a road connecting the two major ports of Anyer, part of modern-day Banten and Panarukan in modern-day Situbondo. Following the Indonesian independence. The road becomes the main route connecting the major cities of Jakarta, Semarang, and Surabaya, albeit with several deviations, instead of going through the old Preanger cities of Bogor, Cianjur, Bandung, Sumedang, before rejoining the coast in Cirebon, the new road instead follows the northern Java coast and is more commonly known as Pantura (Jalur Pantai Utara, literally meaning North Coast Road). Over the years, the highway became increasingly congested, the volume of cars using it increases each year, especially during Eid or Christmas seasons. The congestion is also caused by the fact that the highway is open-access, meaning that everyone, including pedestrians could use this road, not just intercity traffic. Frequent roadworks along the routes also hampers traffic.

In order to combat congestion, President Suharto started commissioning toll roads along the corridor in the 1980s, following the construction of Indonesia's first toll road, the Jakarta-Bogor-Ciawi (Jagorawi) Toll Road. Soeharto also created a state-owned enterprise PT. Jasa Marga to regulate and operate toll roads in Indonesia.

During this era, the highway was completed in sections. The first section to be fully completed was the section between Tangerang and Jakarta, this section was completed in 1984. Two years later, the section between Surabaya and Gempol (near Pasuruan. Semarang Outer Ring Road was the next section to be fully opened (after having sections of it partially opened starting from 1983), opened in 1988. The next major section to be fully operational is the Jakarta-Cikampek section, spanning 72 km, this highway would become one of the most important and most used highway in Indonesia, as it is the fastest link between Jakarta and cities in eastern West Java, Central Java, and East Java. The Tangerang-Merak section was the next to be completed, also spanning 72 km; this section was opened in 1992, fully connecting the Port of Merak with Jakarta, although links further east and south is not yet available through toll roads. Following the completion of the Tangerang-Merak section, construction along this network stagnated.

In 1995, Soeharto proposed to accelerate the construction of several toll roads, including several along this network. But this instruction was quickly hampered by the 1997 Asian financial crisis, leading to a Presidential Instruction calling off a large number of constructions along the country. During this era, only two sections of the toll road is completed, namely parts of the Jakarta Outer Ring Road completed in 1995 and the Palimanan-Kanci section (bypassing Cirebon).

Following Reformasi, toll road construction still stagnated; remarkably, no toll road in this corridor was completed during the first few years of Reformasi. During the presidency of Susilo Bambang Yudhoyono formed Badan Pengurus Jalan Tol (lit. Highway Operator Board). Following the formation of this board, highway construction, especially in this corridor continued, starting with the completion of several sections of the Jakarta Outer Ring Road and the 33 km Kanci-Pejagan section creating the first highway link between West Java and Central Java, several sections along the Surabaya-Mojokerto section was also completed during this period.

The government of Joko Widodo initiated the process to accelerate the construction of the remaining uncompleted sections of this network, starting with finishing the construction of the 116 km Cikampek-Palimanan section, started during Yudhoyono's presidency. This is regarded as the most important and long-awaited section along this network, as it finally connects Jakarta and Cirebon and onwards to Central and East Java, significantly cutting travel time between the regions, as it allows travellers to bypass one of the busiest sections between the region along the West Java coast.

Following the opening of the Cikampek-Palimanan section, Widodo instructed involved parties, particularly the Ministry of Public Works to accelerate the completion of the remaining sections in both Central Java and East Java. The remaining sections then simultaneously started construction in 2016, along with the finishing of partially completed sections and the construction of a new road on the Porong-Gempol section to replace the one washed out by the Lapindo floods.

After years of construction, this toll road network was finally completed and unveiled by President Joko Widodo on 20 December 2018, with the unveiling taking place on two locations, in Mojokerto and the Kalikuto Bridge, Batang (which became the icon for the new highway), officially connecting Merak and Surabaya. The section connecting Surabaya and Probolinggo was completed and unveiled the next year.

As of 2023, the only uncompleted portions of the Trans-Java Toll Road is the section between Probolinggo and Banyuwangi. The 170 km section, which would connect both Java coasts, is currently under construction at a slow pace due to several problems, mainly arising from land ownership.

== Maps ==
=== Main route ===
Here is the map of the main route section of the Trans-Java Toll Road in 2025

=== Interconnection ===
The following is the updated interconnection map of the Trans-Java Toll Road as of July 2025

=== Previous map ===
For reference, below is the Trans-Java Toll Road map as of July 2020

== Main route ==
=== Tangerang–Merak Toll Road ===
The length of the Tangerang–Merak Toll Road is 72.45 kilometres (45.02 mi). Although this road has been operating since 1981, it continues to lose money because the traffic is lower than expected. From 2005 to 2009, Astratel Nusantara (a subsidiary of Astra International) acquired the concession to build and manage this section of the toll road.

In January 2012, a 1 metre (3.3 ft) flood submerged the toll road at kilometer 58–59, making the road inaccessible to trucks, so the road was rerouted. This caused a traffic jam of up to 35 kilometres (22 mi). Around 2,000 flood refugees occupied the shoulder of the toll road at that time.

=== Jakarta–Tangerang Toll Road ===
The length of the Jakarta–Tangerang Toll Road is 33 kilometres (21 mi), and it is operated by Jasa Marga. By January 2011, the number of vehicles using this highway reached more than 250,000 per day. To ease congestion, the toll road was expanded to 3 lanes in each direction.

=== Jakarta–Cikampek Toll Road ===
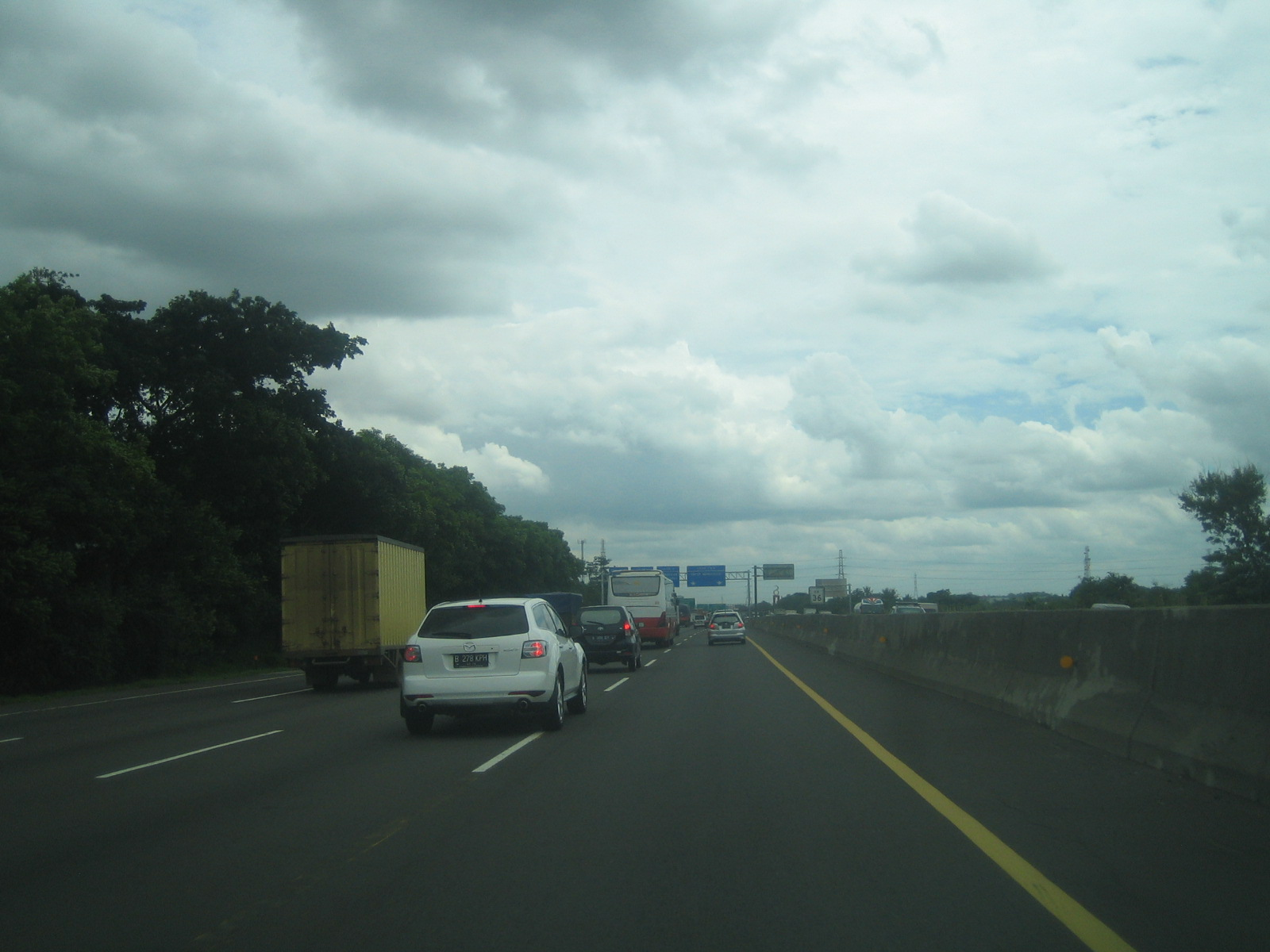
Jakarta-Cikampek toll road is part of the whole Trans-Java toll road

The Jakarta–Cikampek Toll Road is operated by Jasa Marga. The west part of the toll road, near Jakarta, consists of 4 lanes in one direction and 3 lanes in the other direction. This toll road is considered to be one of the most profitable in Java; it collected an average of 2 billion rupiahs (Rp) per day in tolls. The Jakarta-Cikampek Toll Road is heavily congested as it connects Jakarta and several of its satellite cities like Bekasi and Karawang. It also connects to the main routes to Bandung and the North Coast Road.

PT Lippo Cikarang Tbk (IDX:LPCK) and PT Kawasan Industri Jababeka Tbk (IDX:KIJA) constructed a new tollroad gate (Cibatu Gate) at km 34.700 with a 1.5 kilometer access road to their industrial complexes. The tollroad gate was officially opened on 5 April 2014.

There is also the Jakarta–Cikampek Toll Road II Elevated from interchange Cikunir to West Karawang (Sta 9+500 till Sta 47+500) without any exit in between, because this toll road is planned for long trip drivers. PT Jasamarga Jalanlayang Cikampek has the concession and it has formally opened for small vehicles only on 15 December 2019, buses and trucks are not allowed to use it, so at the entrance gates there are portal for it.

=== Cikampek–Palimanan Toll Road ===
The Cikampek–Palimanan Toll Road (Cikopo-Palimanan (Cipali) Toll Road) is the former longest toll road in Indonesia, at 116 kilometres (72 mi). It runs through Cikopo, Kalijati, Subang, Cikedung, Kertajati, Sumberjaya and Palimanan. Total investment in the toll road reached Rp 12.8 trillion (US$1 billion) and the main investor is PT Lintas Marga Sedaya, a subsidiary of PT Surya Semesta Internusa Tbk (IDX:SSIA). Construction started on 8 December 2011, after eight national and international banks committed to provide funds for the project. The toll road was formally opened on 13 June 2015. It allows drivers to travel from Cikampek to Cirebon in 1.5 hours instead of 3.5 hours, and is projected to ease traffic on the North Coast Road by 50%.

On the first week when the road opened, 15 accidents occurred and 3 people were killed. By 8 July 2015 (three weeks after the toll road was opened), there were 56 accidents with 12 people killed. Most of the accidents were caused by driver errors such as sleep-deprived driving, speeding, and using the emergency lane at high speed. As of 2026, its shares are owned by Astra International.

=== Palimanan–Kanci Toll Road ===
The length of the Palimanan–Kanci Toll Road is 26.3 kilometres (16.3 mi). It is operated by Jasa Marga.

=== Kanci–Pejagan Toll Road ===
The Kanci–Pejagan Toll Road was formally opened on 26 January 2010, and was operated originally by PT Bakrie Toll Road, a subsidiary of PT Bakrieland Development Tbk (IDX:ELTY), but in December, 2012, the shares were sold to PT Media Nusantara Citra (MNC) Group. At end of 2015, Waskita Karya has 99.99 percent shares of the toll road.

=== Pejagan–Pemalang Toll Road ===
The Pejagan–Pemalang toll road is 57.5 kilometres (35.7 mi) and was built with an investment of about Rp 5.5 trillion. The concession for the road was held by PT Bakrie Toll Road, which is owned by Aburizal Bakrie, but in December, 2012, the shares were sold to MNC Group. On 16 July 2014, PT Waskita Toll Road, a subsidiary of PT Waskita Karya Tbk (IDX:WSKT), bought all shares of the toll road.

Construction on Sections I and II of the toll road began on 23 July 2014. On 16 June 2016, Section I & II of Pejagan-Pemalang Toll Road has been formally opened/operated. On 9 November 2018, Section III & IV of Pejagan-Pemalang Toll Road has been formally opened/operated.

The toll road consists of 4 sections:

- Section I, Pejagan–West Brebes, 14.25 kilometres (8.85 mi)
- Section II, West Brebes–East Brebes, 6 kilometres (3.7 mi)
- Section III, East Brebes–East Tegal, 10.4 kilometres (6.5 mi)
- Section IV, East Tegal–Pemalang, 26.9 kilometres (16.7 mi)

=== Pemalang–Batang Toll Road ===
Construction of the Pemalang–Batang Toll Road has reached 97% in June 2017. The concession was given to PT Pemalang Batang Toll Road for 39 kilometres (24 mi) for an investment of about Rp 4.0 trillion. On 9 November 2018, Section I of the toll road has been formally opened and operated.

=== Batang–Semarang Toll Road ===
The length of Batang–Semarang Toll Road is 75 kilometres (47 mi) with a cost of Rp 7.21 trillion ($0.8 billion). Initially the concession was owned by PT Bakrie Toll Road, but in December, 2012, the shares were sold to MNC Group. In April 2016, Jasamarga Semarang Batang which owned by Jasamarga 60 percent and Waskita Karya 40 percent got the concession for 45 years through government tender due to there are no progress of the toll road when it has been held by previous owners.

The toll road consists of five sections:

- Section-1: 3.2 km, in East Batang
- Section-2: 36.35 km, connecting East Batang and Weleri
- Section-3: 11.95 km, connecting Weleri and Kendal
- Section-4: 13.5 km, connecting Kendal and Kaliwungu
- Section-5: 10.9 km, connecting Kaliwungu and Krapyak

All the lands affected by the toll road were acquired in February 2017 and the toll road is predicted to be opened for the 2017 Eid Al-Fitr. The toll road is expected to be fully operational by 2018.

=== Semarang–Solo Toll Road ===
The Semarang–Solo Toll Road is 72.64 kilometres (45.14 mi). It is operated by PT Trans Marga Jateng, a joint-venture company owned by PT Sarana Pembangunan Jawa Tengah (40%) and PT Jasa Marga (IDX:JSMR) Tbk (60%).

Section E1, which is 11.3 kilometres (7.0 mi), was officially opened for commercial operation on 12 November 2011. Section II (Ungaran–Bawen), is 11.95 kilometres (7.43 mi) and was opened on 4 April 2014. Section III (Bawen-Salatiga) with 17.6 kilometres (10.9 mi), was opened on 15 September 2017, temporary for small vehicles only, and formally opened on 25 September of that same year. Section IV Salatiga-Boyolali is 24.50 kilometers and Section V Boyolali-Solo is 7.74 kilometers. Land acquisition of both sections are 98.8 percent when section III was formally operated.

=== Solo–Kertosono Toll Road ===
Solo–Kertosono Toll Road (Soker) connects to Semarang-Solo Toll Road at its west end, and to Kertosono–Mojokerto Toll Road at its east end. Soker Toll Road, with a total length of 176.7 kilometres (109.8 mi), is actually composed of two toll roads, Solo–Mantingan–Ngawi (Solman) Toll Road and Ngawi–Kertosono (Manker) Toll Road. The length of Solo–Mantingan–Ngawi Toll Road is 90.1 kilometres (56.0 mi), while the length of Ngawi–Kertosono is 86.6 kilometres (53.8 mi). It is jointly operated by PT Jasamarga Solo Ngawi and PT Jasamarga Ngawi Kertosono Kediri.

Soker Toll Road is divided into 4 sections, Solman I and Solman II in Central Java, and Manker I and Manker II in East Java Province. In July 2012, the land acquisition of the each section was about at 65%. Although the land acquisition is unfinished, construction of section 1 has begun. The sections of the Soker toll road are:

- Colomadu–Karanganyar Section: 1.7 kilometres (1.1 mi) of access road in Ngasem, Colomadu plus 20.9 kilometres (13.0 mi) of toll road with a total cost of Rp 1.8 trillion (government-support portion)
- Karanganyar–Saradan Section: 120 kilometres (75 mi) with a total cost of Rp 5.57 trillion (investor portion)
- Saradan–Kertosono Section: 40.1 kilometres (24.9 mi) with a total cost of Rp 1.7 trillion (government-support portion)

On 29 March 2018, a 52 kilometers toll road of Klitik-Wilangan has been inaugurated as a part of 87.5 kilometers of Ngawi-Kertosono Toll Road. On 15 July, a 35.2 kilometers toll road of Kartosuro-Sragen has been inaugurated as a part of 176.7 kilometers of Solo-Kertosono Toll Road. On 28 November, a 51.0 kilometers toll road of Sragen-Ngawi has been inaugurated.

=== Kertosono–Mojokerto Toll Road ===
The length of the Kertosono–Mojokerto Toll Road is 40.5 kilometres (25.2 mi), divided into 4 sections:

- Section 1 (Bandar–Jombang) – 14.7 kilometres (9.1 mi)
- Section 2 (Jombang–West Mojokerto) –19.9 kilometres (12.4 mi)
- Section 3 (West Mojokerto–North Mojokerto) – 5.0 kilometres (3.1 mi)
- Section 4 (connection with Ngawi-Kertosono Toll Road) – 0.9 kilometres (0.56 mi).

The concession is held by PT Marga Harjaya Infrastructure (MHI), whose majority owner (95%) is Astratel Nusantara (a subsidiary of Astra International). Marga Harjaya Infrastructure is funding the entire project without bank loans. The toll road was free for a month of trial operation, and on 20 November 2014, Section 1 was opened formally with a toll rate of Rp 10,000 for small vehicles. From the opening until the end of December 2014, only about 800 vehicles per day used Section 1, rather than the 11,000 vehicles per day that was predicted. MHI officials suggested that the toll road has not been used because it is too short and that the numbers will increase when the other sections open. Section 3 has been opened in December 2016, on 10 September 2017, Section 2 is formally opened. Section 4, which is only 0.9 kilometres (0.56 mi) will be opened together with Ngawi-Kertosono Toll Road.

=== Mojokerto–Surabaya Toll Road ===
The length of the Mojokerto-Surabaya Toll Road is 36.27 kilometres (22.54 mi), and is also known as Sumo (Surabaya–Mojokerto) Toll Road. It is operated and maintained by PT Jasamarga Surabaya Mojokerto. It connects with the Surabaya–Gempol Toll Road and the Waru-Juanda Toll Road. All sections of the toll road is already operated:

- Section IA, Waru-Sepanjang, 2.3 kilometres (1.4 mi), open since August 2011.
- Section IB, Sepanjang-WRR 4.3 kilometres (2.7 mi), open since 19 December 2017.
- Section II, WRR-Driyorejo, 5.1 kilometres (3.2 mi), open since 19 December 2017.
- Section III, Driyorejo-Krian, 6.1 kilometres (3.8 mi), open since 19 December 2017.
- Section IV, Krian-Mojokerto, 18.47 kilometres (11.48 mi), open since 19 March 2016.

=== Surabaya–Gempol Toll Road ===
The length of the Surabaya–Gempol Toll Road is 49 kilometres (30 mi), and the concession is owned by PT Jasa Marga. The road is open through Porong, but beyond that a 2-kilometer section of the old Porong Toll Road was damaged by the Lapindo Mudflow on 29 May 2006. To avoid this problem in the future, there is a plan for a new, 10 kilometres (6.2 mi), Porong-Gempol Toll Road.

=== Gempol–Pasuruan Toll Road ===
The length of the Gempol–Pasuruan Toll Road is about 34.15 kilometres (21.22 mi). It consists of three sections: Section I, Gempol–Rembang, is 13.9 kilometres (8.6 mi); Section II, Rembang–Pasuruan, is 6.6 kilometres (4.1 mi); and Section III, Pasuruan-Grati, is 13.65 kilometres (8.48 mi). Concession of the toll road is 45 years belong to PT Trans Marga Jatim Pasuruan, a joint venture between PT Jasa Marga (Persero) Tbk and PT Jatim Prasarana Utama with composition shares 98,81 percent and 1,19 percent respectively.

On 31 March 2017, Section IB from Bangil to Rembang has been opened. And on 3 August 2017, Section IIA from Gempol to Bangil has been opened. Section II from Rembang to Pasuruan has formally opened on 22 June 2018. Other toll roads that relieve congestion in this area are the Kejapanan-Gempol and Gempol-Pandaan Toll Roads which opened in May 2015.

=== Pasuruan–Probolinggo Toll Road ===
The concession of Pasuruan–Probolinggo Toll Road was owned by PT Bakrie Toll Road, but in December 2012, the shares were sold to MNC Group. Now PT Waskita Tol Road (WTR) is the owner of this toll road. Section 1, 2 and 3 are formally opened on 10 April 2019.

The toll road consists of:

- Section-1: Grati–Nguling, 8 kilometers
- Section-2: Nguling–Sumberasih, 6 kilometers
- Section-3: Sumberasih–Leces, 16 kilometers
- Section-4: Leces–Gending, 14 kilometers

=== Probolinggo–Banyuwangi Toll Road ===
Concession of the 172.91 kilometers Probolinggo–Banyuwangi Toll Road has been got by PT Jasa Marga, PT Waskita Toll Road and PT Brantas Abipraya (Persero). The segment of Situbondo–Banyuwangi will pass by the Ketapang Ferry Terminal, a harbor that connects Java and Bali. The Probolinggo-Banyuwangi Toll Road consists of three sections,

- Section I: Probolinggo-Besuki (46.5 kilometers),
- Section II: Besuki-Asembagus (59.6 kilometers), and
- Section III: Asembagus-Ketapang (66.8 kilometers).

== Complementary toll roads ==
=== Jakarta Inner & Outer Ring roads ===
Jakarta Inner Ring Road is connected directly with the Jakarta–Cikampek Toll Road at Cawang/Halim. At Tomang, a non-toll road connects the Inner Ring Road with Jakarta–Tangerang Toll Road. The length of the Inner Ring Road is 50.6 kilometres (31.4 mi). It is operated by Citra Marga Nusaphala Persada (IDX:CMNP), which controls 55% of the shares, and PT Jasa Marga (IDX:JSMR), which controls the remaining 45%. In 2010, PT CMNP received 93% of the company revenue from this toll road.

Jakarta Outer Ring Road (JORR) is connected with the Jakarta–Tangerang Toll Road at Kebon Jeruk and with Jakarta-Cikampek Toll Road at Cikunir. JORR is a 7-section toll road spanning 65 kilometres (40 mi).

The W1 section (JORR-W1) between Penjaringan and Kebon Jeruk is operated by PT Nusantara Infrastructure Tbk (IDX:META) while the rest is operated by PT Jasa Marga.

The W2 section (JORR-W2), between Kebon Jeruk and Ulujami, is almost 8 kilometres (5.0 mi) long and has 4 sections: section 1 from Kebun Jeruk (Kembangan) to South Meruya is 1.95 kilometres (1.21 mi); section 2 from South Meruya to Joglo is 1.5 kilometres (0.93 mi); section 3 from Joglo to Ciledug is 2.35 kilometres (1.46 mi); and section 4 from Ciledug to Ulujami is 2.07 kilometres (1.29 mi). The concession for JORR-W2 is held by PT Marga Lingkar Jaya (MLJ) which is a joint-venture company. PT Marga Lingkar Jakarta owns 50% of PT MLJ and Jakarta Marga Jaya owns 35%. Sections 1, 2, and 3 of the JORR-W2, from Kebun Jeruk to Ciledug, were opened on December 27, 2013, while Section 4 was opened on July 21, 2014. With the completion of the W2 section, 53.24 kilometers of toll road between Rorotan and Penjaringan were fully connected. The toll road can hold about 100,000 vehicles per day and is expected to ease about 30% of the congestion on the Jakarta Inner Ring Toll Road.

The section between Koja and Tanjung Priok Port consists of 5 sub-sections and is predicted to be completed by mid-2015:

- Section E1, Rorotan–Cilincing, 34 kilometres (21 mi) (has been opened, no toll fee)
- Section E2, Cilincing–Jampea, 2.75 kilometres (1.71 mi)
- Section E2A, Cilincing–Simpang Jampea, 1.92 kilometres (1.19 mi)
- Section NS, Yos Sudarso–Simpang Jampea, 2.24 kilometres (1.39 mi)
- Section NS, Direct Ramp, 1.1 kilometres (0.68 mi)

To reduce traffic jams, trucks with a weight of 5 tonnes and above are not allowed to use the Cawang-Semanggi-Pluit segments from 05:00am to 10:00pm.

=== Jakarta Outer Ring Road 2 ===
Jakarta Outer Ring Road 2 Toll Road from Cengkareng to (access to) Tanjung Priok is 110.4 kilometers length, but until end of 2019 only 11,135 kilometers (Kunciran – Serpong) has been operated.

=== Jagorawi Toll Road ===
The Jagorawi Toll Road was the first toll road in Indonesia. It is 59 kilometres (37 mi) and connects Jakarta, Bogor and Ciawi. The Jagorawi Toll Road was built to connect Jakarta and Bandung via Puncak, but since the Purbaleunyi Toll Road opened, it is used primarily for tourists to travel to Puncak. There are plans to extend this toll road to reach Bandung so that there will be two ways to travel from Bandung, via Jakarta-Cikampek Toll Road and Purbaleunyi Toll Road, or using the Jagorawi Toll Road.

=== Cinere–Jagorawi Toll Road ===
Cinere-Jagorawi Toll Road or Cijago Toll Road is a 14.64 kilometers toll road which extends from Jagorawi Toll Road to Cinere. Section I from Cisalak to Jagorawi was inaugurated on January 27, 2012, which is 3.7 kilometers. Cinere – Cisalak section is expected to complete by the end of 2018. Metro and long distance and long or medium distances from Depok bus terminal will cross this toll road, without passing Lenteng Agung and Pasar Minggu. This toll road is part of the Jakarta Outer Ring Road 2.

=== Cinere–Serpong Toll Road ===
Cinere-Serpong Toll Road will connect the Kunciran-Serpong Toll Road in the west and the Cinere-Jagorawi Toll Road in the east. This toll road that connects South Tangerang with Depok. It is part of the Jakarta Outer Ring Road 2, which is expected to be completed in 2019. This toll road is divided into two sections. Section 1 is 6.67 kilometers from Serpong to Pamulang, while Section 2 is 3.64 kilometers from Pamulang to Cinere.

=== Cibitung–Cilincing Toll Road ===
The 34 kilometres (21 mi) Cibitung–Cilincing Toll Road will run between Cibitung and Cilincing. This is part of Jakarta Outer Ring Road 2. It will be composed of 4 sections:

- Section-1, Cibitung–SS Telaga Asih, 2.65 kilometres (1.65 mi)
- Section-2, SS Telaga Asih–SS Tembalang 9.72 kilometres (6.04 mi)
- Section-3, SS Tembalang–SS Tarumajaya, 14.29 kilometres (8.88 mi)
- Section-4, SS Tarumajaya–Cilincing, 7.27 kilometres (4.52 mi).

From Cibitung it will connect to the Jakarta–Cikampek Toll Road, and from Cilincing it will connect to Jakarta Inner Ring Road via the Koja-Tanjung Priok Port Toll Road. At Cimanggis Interchange, the toll road will be connected to the Jagorawi Toll Road and the Cinere-Jagorawi Toll Road which are currently under construction. The road concession is shared by three companies: MTD Capital Bhd (50%); PT Akses Pelabuhan Indonesia (45%); and PT Nusacipta Eka Pratama (5%). Construction is scheduled to begin in 2016 and the road to open in 2018.

=== Depok–Antasari Toll Road ===
Depok-Antasari Toll Road will connect South Jakarta with Depok and Bogor. This toll road extends from Jalan Pangeran Antasari of South Jakarta to Depok. The toll road will be extended to Bogor, precisely to Bogor Ring Road and Dramarga Toll Road – Bocimi. Depok-Antasari along 21.54 km consists of 5 sections of work, currently the development of physical construction has reached 60%.

=== Bogor–Ciawi–Sukabumi Toll Road ===
The Bogor-Ciawi–Sukabumi Toll Road or Bocimi is 54 kilometres (34 mi) and is an expansion of the Jagorawi Toll Road. The full expansion project is to create a second toll route from Jakarta to Bandung. Groundbreaking for Section-1 (Ciawi-Cigombong), which is 15.35 kilometres (9.54 mi), took place on February 9, 2015; all of the necessary land had been acquired by this time. The initial concession for the road belonged to PT Bakrie Toll Road, but it was sold to MNC Group.

=== Jakarta–Cikampek II South Toll Road ===
Concession of the 62 kilometers Jakarta–Cikampek II South Toll Road has been got by PT Jasamarga Japek Selatan. The toll road connects Jakarta Outer Ring Road Toll and Purbaleunyi Toll Road at Jatiasih Gate and Sadang Gate. The other gates are Bantar Gebang, Setu, Sukaragam, Taman Mekar, and Kutanegara. There are 3 sections:

- Section 1: Jati Asih – Setu, 9.3 kilometers
- Section 2: Setu – Taman Mekar, 24.85 kilometers
- Section 3: Taman Mekar – Sadang, 27.85 kilometer.

In July 2019, 60 percent of land acquisitions have been done and initial constructions have been done also.

=== Cipularang Toll Road ===
Cipularang Toll Road is a controlled-access toll road in Java, Indonesia. Opened in 2005, this road connects the Jakarta–Cikampek Toll Road and the Padaleunyi Toll Road. It runs from the north to south with the north end at Jakarta-Cikampek Toll Road and the south end at Cisumdawu Toll Road. Since it opened, this toll road has cut the time of car travel from Jakarta to Bandung to 2 hours.

=== Cisumdawu Toll Road ===
Cisumdawu Toll Road connects the cities of Cileunyi, Sumedang, and Dawuan. The toll road will connect Kertajati International Airport.

=== Surabaya–Gresik Toll Road ===
The Surabaya–Gresik Toll Road connects Surabaya with Gresik. Gresik is an important port for East Java, and it is the location of PT Semen Gresik (Gresik Cement). This toll road is operated by PT Margabumi Matraraya.

=== Surabaya–Tanjung Perak Toll Road ===
The Surabaya–Tanjung Perak Toll Road or SERR (Surabaya East Ring Road) connects the city of Surabaya with its port at Tanjung Perak.

=== KLBM Toll Road ===
Ngoro-Krian-Legundi-Bunder-Manyar Toll Road or abbreviated as KLBM Toll Road is a 38.39 kilometer toll road that connects the Krian area, Sidoarjo Regency and Manyar, Gresik Regency, East Java Province. This toll road is connected with the planned Tuban-Gresik Toll Road to the north and the Surabaya-Mojokerto Toll Road to the south. This toll road crosses the Sidoarjo and Gresik Regencies. KLBM Toll Road is a toll road that connects the main industrial areas in the main buffer areas of Surabaya, namely Sidoarjo and Gresik. This toll road is planned to start operating in 2019.

=== Waru–Juanda Toll Road ===
The Waru–Juanda Toll Road connects Surabaya with its airport (Juanda International Airport). This toll road is fully operated by Citra Margatama Surabaya, a subsidiary of Citra Marga Nusaphala Persada.

=== Juanda–Tanjung Perak Toll Road ===
The Juanda–Tanjung Perak Toll Road is also called the Surabaya Eastern Ring Road (SERR). It will connect Juanda International Airport with Tanjung Perak Port.

=== Pandaan–Malang Toll Road ===
The 38.5-kilometre (23.9 mi) Pandaan-Malang Toll Road is divided into five sections: Section 1 (15.5 kilometres (9.6 mi)) between Pandaan and Purwodadi, Section 2 (8.1 kilometres (5.0 mi) between Purwodadi and Lawang, Section 3 7.1 kilometres (4.4 mi) between Lawang and Singosari, Section 4 (4.8 kilometres (3.0 mi) between Singosari and Pakis, and Section 5 (3.1 kilometres (1.9 mi) between Pakis and Malang. This toll road connects with Gempol-Pandaan Toll Road. On May 13, 2019, Sections 1, 2 and 3 have been formally opened, whereas Section 4 which is 87 percent completed, is opened for daytime travel only to accommodate travellers leaving for Eid Al-Fitr. The toll road has reduced traffic on arterial roads and national roads, which will facilitate transportation of goods to Malang and Batu, and has cut the travel time between Pandaan and Malang to less than an hour.

=== Solo–Yogyakarta–Kulonprogo Toll Road ===
The Solo–Yogyakarta-Kulonprogo Toll Road will connect the cities of Surakarta and Yogyakarta. The toll road runs from north to south with the north end connected to the Semarang-Solo Toll Road and the south end connected Yogyakarta-Magelang.

=== Semarang–Demak Toll Road ===
On September 23, 2019, a concession to PT Pembangunan Perumahan Semarang Demak signing has been done for building 27 kilometers Semarang Demak Toll Road. The toll road will be also functioned as embankment to avoid land inundation by sea water. Predicted the project will be finished and functioned in 2022.

== Impact ==
The completion of Trans-Java Toll Road connecting Jakarta and Surabaya in 2018 created a surge of intercity bus services in Indonesia. During this time, some intercity bus services began operating fleet of double decker busses.

== Junction lists ==
=== Jakarta–Tangerang–Merak section ===
Note: The distance and exit number are measured from the start of this section

Province	Regency	Location	km	mi	Exit	Name	Destinations	Notes
Jakarta	West Jakarta	Grogol Petamburan	0.0	0.0	0	Tomang Interchange	Jakarta Inner Ring Road – Soekarno-Hatta International Airport, Tanjung Priok, Pluit, Semanggi, Cawang, Cikampek	Western terminus, Start of Toll Route 7
Jakarta	West Jakarta	Grogol Petamburan	0.0	0.0	Tomang Toll Gate (westbound tolls only)			
Jakarta	West Jakarta	Grogol Petamburan	0.0	0.0	0	Tomang Ramp	Tomang, Slipi, Grogol	
Jakarta	West Jakarta	Kebon Jeruk	3.29	2.04	3	Kebon Jeruk Toll Gate	Kebon Jeruk, Kedoya	
Jakarta	West Jakarta	Kembangan	5.93	3.68	6	Meruya Toll Gate	Meruya, Kembangan, Joglo	Westbound exit, eastbound entry only
Jakarta	West Jakarta	Kembangan	7.30	4.54	7	Meruya Interchange	Jakarta Outer Ring Road – Soekarno-Hatta International Airport, Rawa Buaya, Kalideres, Meruya, Joglo, Ciledug	
Banten	Tangerang	Karang Tengah	9.51	5.91	11	Karang Tengah Barat Toll Gate	Karang Tengah, Ciledug, Cipondoh	
Banten	Tangerang	Pinang	15.23	9.46	15	Kunciran Interchange	Jakarta Outer Ring Road 2 – Soekarno-Hatta International Airport, Pinang, Cipondoh, Kunciran, Bintaro, Serpong	
Banten	Tangerang	Pinang	15.23	9.46	15	Kunciran Toll Gate	Kunciran, Alam Sutera, Serpong	Westbound exit, eastbound entry only
Banten	Tangerang	Pinang	18.51	11.50	18	Tangerang Toll Gate	Tangerang, Pakulonan, Serpong	
Banten	Tangerang	Kelapa Dua	20.95	13.02	21	Karawaci Toll Gate	Karawaci, Binong, Legok	
Banten	Tangerang	Curug	26.50	16.47	26	Bitung Toll Gate	Bitung, Curug, Budiarto Airport	
Banten	Tangerang	Cikupa	31.63	19.65	Cikupa Toll Gate (Main toll gate/Border between Jakarta–Tangerang and Tangerang–Merak)			
Banten	Tangerang	Cikupa	35.78	22.23	35	Balaraja Timur Toll Gate	Balaraja, Tigaraksa, Cikupa	
Banten	Tangerang	Balaraja	39.11	24.30	39	Balaraja Barat Toll Gate	Balaraja, Tigaraksa	
Banten	Serang	Cikande	52.33	32.52	52	Cikande Toll Gate	Cikande, Cikande Industrial Complex	
Banten	Serang	Kragilan	59.95	37.25	60	Ciujung Toll Gate	Ciujung, Kragilan	
Banten	Serang	Ciruas	64.10	39.83	64	Walantaka Interchange	Serang–Panimbang Toll Road – Rangkasbitung, Pandeglang, Tanjung Lesung	
Banten	Serang	Cipocok Jaya	72.21	44.87	72	Serang Timur Toll Gate	Serang, Old Banten, Pandeglang	
Banten	Serang	Taktakan	77.62	48.23	77	Serang Barat Toll Gate	Serang, Kramatwatu	
Banten	Serang	Kramatwatu	87.36	54.28	87	Cilegon Timur Toll Gate	Cilegon, Bojonegara	
Banten	Cilegon	Purwakarta	95.19	59.15	95	Cilegon Barat Toll Gate	Cilegon, Anyer, Carita, Krakatau Steel	Westbound exit, eastbound entry only
Banten	Cilegon	Grogol	98.48	61.19	98	Merak Toll Gate	Merak	Westernmost toll gate/exit in Java, Western terminus of Toll Route 1
1.000 mi = 1.609 km; 1.000 km = 0.621 mi: Electronic toll collection; Incomplete access; Route transition

=== Jakarta–Cirebon–Semarang section ===
Note: Distance is measured from the start of name of toll road, meanwhile exit number is measured from the start of this section

Province	Regency	Location	km	mi	Exit	Name	Destinations	Notes
Jakarta	East Jakarta	Jatinegara	0.0	0.0	0	Cawang Interchange	Jakarta Inner Ring Road – Grogol, Tangerang, Soekarno-Hatta International Airport, Jatinegara, Ancol, Tanjung Priok	Western terminus, End of Toll Route 7
Jakarta	East Jakarta	Makasar	2.0	1.2	Halim Utama Toll Gate (westbound tolls only)			
Jakarta	East Jakarta	Makasar	2.09	1.30	2	Halim Toll Gate	Cawang, Halim Airport; Jagorawi Toll Road	Westbound exit only
Jakarta	East Jakarta	Makasar	4.02	2.50	4	Pondok Gede Barat Toll Gate	Pondok Gede, Jatiwaringin, Pondok Kelapa	
West Java	Bekasi	Pondok Gede	8.00	4.97	8	Pondok Gede Timur Toll Gate	Jatibening, Cikunir	Eastbound exit & Westbound entry only.
West Java	Bekasi	Pondok Gede	9.25	5.75	10	Cikunir Interchange	Jakarta Outer Ring Road – Pondok Kelapa, Bintara, Tanjung Priok, Jatiasih, Jatiwarna; Jagorawi Toll Road	
West Java	Bekasi	Pondok Gede	9.45	5.87	10		Sheikh Mohammed bin Zayed Skyway – East Karawang, Bandung, Cikampek	Small vehicles only, Westbound terminus, Eastbound entrance
West Java	Bekasi	South Bekasi	13.10	8.14	14	Bekasi Barat Toll Gate	West Bekasi, Pekayon, Kalimalang	
West Java	Bekasi	East Bekasi	16.59	10.31	16	Bekasi Timur Toll Gate	East Bekasi, Bulak Kapal, Bantar Gebang	
West Java	Bekasi	South Tambun	21.06	13.09	21	Tambun Toll Gate	Tambun, Setu, Mustika Jaya	
West Java	Bekasi	Cikarang	24.18	15.02	24	Cibitung Interchange		
West Java	Bekasi	Cikarang	29.40	18.27	30	Cikarang Utara Toll Gate	Cikarang Dry Port	
West Java	Bekasi	Cikarang	30.84	19.16	31	Cikarang Barat Toll Gate	North Cikarang, Lemahabang, Cibarusah	
West Java	Bekasi	Cikarang	34.43	21.39	34	Cibatu Toll Gate	Cibatu, Jayamukti, Industrial Complex	
West Java	Bekasi	Cikarang	37.02	23.00	37	Cikarang Pusat Toll Gate	East Cikarang, Pasirranji, Sukamahi	
West Java	Karawang	West Telukjambe	46.84	29.11	47	Karawang Barat Toll Gate	West Karawang, Rengasdengklok	
West Java	Karawang	West Telukjambe	47.45	29.48	47		Sheikh Mohammed bin Zayed Skyway – Jakarta, Bogor	Small vehicles only, Eastbound terminus, Westbound entrance
West Java	Karawang	Klari	54.04	33.58	54	Karawang Timur Toll Gate	East Karawang, Klari	
West Java	Karawang	Cikampek	66.96	41.61	67	Kalihurip Interchange	Cipularang Toll Road – Bandung	Northern end of Toll Route 4
West Java	Karawang	Cikampek	67.93	42.21	68	Kalihurip Toll Gate	Dawuan, Kalihurip, Bukit Indah	
West Java	Karawang	Cikampek	69.88	43.42	Cikampek Utama Toll Gate (Main toll gate)			
West Java	Purwakarta	Bungursari	72.50	45.05	72	Cikampek Toll Gate	Cikampek, Bungursari, Purwakarta	Eastern terminus
West Java	Purwakarta	Bungursari	73.80	45.86	Cikopo–Palimanan Toll Road			
West Java	Purwakarta	Bungursari	0.0	0.0	72	Cikampek Toll Gate	Cikampek, Bungursari, Purwakarta; Jakarta–Cikampek Toll Road	Western terminus
West Java	Subang	Kalijati	25.51	15.85	98	Kalijati Toll Gate	Kalijati, Purwadadi, Sukamandi	
West Java	Subang	Subang	37.06	23.03	109	Subang Toll Gate	Subang, Pamanukan, Lembang	
West Java	Indramayu	Terisi	65.42	40.65	137	Cikedung Toll Gate	Cikedung, Cikamurang, Indramayu	
West Java	Majalengka	Kertajati	79.61	49.47	152	Kertajati Junction	Cisumdawu Toll Road – Sumedang, Bandung	
West Java	Majalengka	Kertajati	85.85	53.34	159	Kertajati Toll Gate	Kertajati International Airport, Kertajati, Majalengka	
West Java	Majalengka	Sumberjaya	101.98	63.37	174	Sumberjaya Toll Gate	Sumberjaya, Jatiwangi, Bandung	
West Java	Cirebon	Palimanan	116.06	72.12	188	Palimanan Interchange	Palimanan, Jatibarang, Indramayu	Eastern terminus
West Java	Cirebon	Palimanan	116.26	72.24	Palimanan–Kanci Toll Road			
West Java	Cirebon	Palimanan	0.0	0.0	188	Palimanan Toll Gate	Palimanan, Jatibarang, Indramayu; Cikopo–Palimanan Toll Road	Western terminus
West Java	Cirebon	Plumbon	6.38	3.96	194	Plumbon Toll Gate	Plumbon, Plered, Trusmi	
West Java	Cirebon	Talun	15.22	9.46	203	Ciperna Toll Gate	Ciperna, Cirebon, Kuningan	
West Java	Cirebon	Astanajapura	26.16	16.26	214	Kanci Toll Gate	Kanci, Astanajapura	Eastern terminus
West Java	Cirebon	Astanajapura	26.30	16.34	Kanci–Pejagan Toll Road			
West Java	Cirebon	Astanajapura	0.0	0.0	214	Kanci Toll Gate	Kanci, Astanajapura; Palimanan–Kanci Toll Road	Western terminus
West Java	Cirebon	Ciledug	18.35	11.40	233	Ciledug Toll Gate	Ciledug, Losari, Kuningan	
Central Java	Brebes	Tanjung	33.57	20.86	247	Pejagan Toll Gate	Pejagan, Prupuk, Purwokerto, Cilacap	Eastern terminus
Central Java	Brebes	Tanjung	33.70	20.94	Pejagan–Pemalang Toll Road			
Central Java	Brebes	Tanjung	0.0	0.0	248	Pejagan Toll Gate	Pejagan, Prupuk, Purwokerto, Cilacap; Kanci–Pejagan Toll Road	Western terminus
Central Java	Brebes	Wanasari	14.60	9.07	263	Brebes Barat Toll Gate	Bulakamba, Klampok	
Central Java	Brebes	Brebes	20.63	12.82	268	Brebes Timur Toll Gate	Brebes, Tegal	
Central Java	Tegal	Talang	31.24	19.41	279	Tegal Toll Gate	Slawi, Tegal, Guci	
Central Java	Pemalang	Taman	64.03	39.79	312	Pemalang Toll Gate	Pemalang, Comal	Eastern terminus
Central Java	Pemalang	Taman	64.10	39.83	Pemalang–Batang Toll Road			
Central Java	Pemalang	Taman	0.0	0.0	312	Pemalang Toll Gate	Pemalang, Comal; Pejagan–Pemalang Toll Road	Western terminus
Central Java	Pekalongan	Bojong	19.14	11.89	331	Bojong Toll Gate	Pekalongan, Kajen	
Central Java	Batang	Warungasem	29.74	18.48	341	Batang Toll Gate	Batang, Pekalongan	
Central Java	Batang	Kandeman	36.48	22.67	348	Kandeman Toll Gate	Batang, Subah, Kandeman	Eastern terminus
Central Java	Batang	Kandeman	36.60	22.74	Batang–Semarang Toll Road			
Central Java	Batang	Kandeman	0.0	0.0	348	Kandeman Toll Gate	Batang, Subah, Kandeman; Pemalang–Batang Toll Road	Western terminus
Central Java	Batang	Gringsing	23.96	14.89	371	Gringsing Toll Gate	Gringsing, Industrial Area	
Central Java	Kendal	Weleri	36.10	22.43	384	Weleri Toll Gate	Weleri, Batang	
Central Java	Kendal	Pegandon	47.04	29.23	395	Kendal Toll Gate	Kendal, Pegandon, Patebon	
Central Java	Kendal	Kaliwungu	60.40	37.53	409	Kaliwungu Toll Gate	Kaliwungu, Boja	
Central Java	Semarang	Ngaliyan	64.88	40.31	Kalikangkung Toll Gate (Main toll gate)			
Central Java	Semarang	Ngaliyan	71.30	44.30	419	Krapyak Interchange	Krapyak, Ahmad Yani International Airport; Semarang Toll Road – Demak, Solo, Surabaya	Eastern terminus, Eastern end of Toll Road Route 1, Western end of Toll Road Route 6
1.000 mi = 1.609 km; 1.000 km = 0.621 mi: Concurrency terminus; Electronic toll collection; Incomplete access; Route transition

=== Semarang–Surakarta–Surabaya section ===
Note: Distance is measured from the start of name of toll road, meanwhile exit number is measured from the start of Jakarta section

Province	Regency	Location	km	mi	Exit	Name	Destinations	Notes
Central Java	Semarang	Ngaliyan/West Semarang	0.0	0.0	419	Krapyak Interchange	Batang–Semarang Toll Road – Batang, Pemalang, Jakarta	
Central Java	Semarang	West Semarang	0.8	0.50	Krapyak Toll Gate (Northbound tolls only)			
Central Java	Semarang	West Semarang	2.45	1.52	421	Manyaran Toll Gate		Southbound entrance only
Central Java	Semarang	Gajahmungkur	7.83	4.87	427	Jatingaleh Toll Gate	Jatingaleh, Simpang Lima, Jatidiri Stadium	
Central Java	Semarang	Candisari	10.11	6.28	429	Jangli Interchange	Northbound (Section C) – Port of Tanjung Emas, Demak, Purwodadi; Southbound (Section B) – Tembalang, Srondol; Semarang–Solo Toll Road	
Central Java	Semarang	Banyumanik	0.0	0.0	419 (433)	Tembalang Interchange	Semarang Toll Road – Kota Lama Semarang, Port of Tanjung Emas, Ahmad Yani International Airport	Northern terminus
Central Java	Semarang	Banyumanik	1.67	1.04	Banyumanik Toll Gate (Main toll gate)			
Central Java	Semarang	Banyumanik	1.67	1.04	420 (434)	Banyumanik Ramp	Tembalang, Diponegoro University	Northbound exit, southbound entrance only
Central Java	Semarang	East Ungaran	11.18	6.95	430 (444)	Ungaran Toll Gate	Ungaran, Gunungpati, Bandungan	
Central Java	Semarang	Bawen	23.13	14.37	442 (456)	Bawen Toll Gate	Bawen, Ambarawa, Magelang	
Central Java	Semarang	Tengaran	40.43	25.12	459 (473)	Salatiga Toll Gate	Salatiga, Suruh, Tingkir	
Central Java	Boyolali	Mojosongo	62.40	38.77	483 (497)	Boyolali Toll Gate	Boyolali, Klaten, Yogyakarta	
Central Java	Karanganyar	Colomadu	73.68	45.78	493 (507)	Colomadu Toll Gate	Kartasura, Klaten	
Central Java	Boyolali	Banyudono	74.10	46.04	Solo–Kertosono Toll Road			
Central Java	Karanganyar	Colomadu	0.0	0.0	493 (507)	Colomadu Toll Gate	Kartasura, Klaten, Yogyakarta; Semarang–Solo Toll Road; Solo–Yogyakarta Toll Road	Western terminus
Central Java	Boyolali	Ngemplak	5.15	3.20	498 (512)	Adi Sumarmo Airport Toll Gate	Adisumarmo International Airport	
Central Java	Boyolali	Ngemplak	11.44	7.11	504 (518)	Ngemplak Toll Gate	Solo	
Central Java	Karanganyar	Gondangrejo	13.92	8.65	506 (520)	Gondangrejo Toll Gate	Mojosongo, Gondangrejo, Purwodadi, Solo	
Central Java	Karanganyar	Kebakkramat	21.71	13.49	513 (527)	Karanganyar Toll Gate	Palur, Karanganyar, Tawangmangu	
Central Java	Sragen	Sidoharjo	35.59	22.11	527 (541)	Sragen Toll Gate	Sragen, Gemolong, Purwodadi	
Central Java	Sragen	Sambungmacan	52.19	32.43	544 (558)	East Sragen Toll Gate	Mantingan, Gendingan, Purwodadi	
East Java	Ngawi	Ngawi	86.77	53.92	579 (593)	Ngawi Toll Gate	Ngawi, Cepu, Magetan	
East Java	Ngawi	Ngawi	86.80	53.94	Ngawi–Kertosono Toll Road			
East Java	Ngawi	Ngawi	0.0	0.0	579 (593)	Ngawi Toll Gate	Ngawi, Cepu, Magetan; Solo–Ngawi Toll Road	
East Java	Madiun	Madiun	23.63	14.68	602 (616)	Madiun Toll Gate	Madiun Regency, Madiun, Magetan, Ponorogo	
East Java	Madiun	Balerejo	32.16	19.98	611 (625)	Caruban Toll Gate	Caruban, Karangjati	
East Java	Nganjuk	Sukomoro	67.83	42.15	646 (660)	Nganjuk Toll Gate	Nganjuk, Kediri, Blitar	
East Java	Jombang	Bandarkedungmulyo	93.12	57.86	672 (686)	Bandar Toll Gate	Kertosono, Kediri	Eastern terminus
East Java	Jombang	Bandarkedungmulyo	94.0	58.4	Kertosono–Mojokerto Toll Road			
East Java	Jombang	Bandarkedungmulyo	0.0	0.0	672 (686)	Bandar Toll Gate	Kertosono, Kediri; Solo–Kertosono Toll Road	Western terminus
East Java	Jombang	Tembelang	14.41	8.95	686 (700)	Jombang Toll Gate	Jombang, Ploso	
East Java	Mojokerto	Gedeg	34.55	21.47	707 (721)	Mojokerto Barat Toll Gate	Gedeg, Mojokerto, Lamongan	
East Java	Mojokerto	Jetis	39.84	24.76	712 (726)	Penompo Toll Gate	Mojokerto	Eastern terminus
East Java	Mojokerto	Jetis	40.00	24.85	Surabaya–Mojokerto Toll Road			
East Java	Mojokerto	Jetis	0.0	0.0	712 (726)	Penompo Toll Gate	Mojokerto, Mojosari, Balongbendo; Kertosono–Mojokerto Toll Road	Western terminus
East Java	Gresik	Wringinanom	11.42	7.10	724 (738)	Wringinanom Interchange	Krian–Legundi–Bunder–Manyar Toll Road – Gresik, Lamongan, Tuban, Krian, Wringinanom, Balongbendo	Partially functioning from 31 December 2022 – 3 January 2023.
East Java	Gresik	Driyorejo	16.25	10.10	729 (743)	Krian Toll Gate	Krian, Cerme, Mojosari	
East Java	Gresik	Driyorejo	21.95	13.64	735 (749)	Driyorejo Toll Gate	Driyorejo, Lakarsantri, Benowo	
East Java	Surabaya	Karangpilang	28.46	17.68	Warugunung Toll Plaza (Main toll plaza)			
East Java	Surabaya	Karangpilang	29.86	18.55	742 (756)	Karangpilang Toll Gate	Karangpilang, Wonokromo, Wiyung	Eastbound exit, westbound entrance only
East Java	Sidoarjo	Taman	32.09	19.94	745 (759)	Waru Interchange	Surabaya–Gempol Toll Road – Gunung Sari, Sidoarjo, Pasuruan, Malang; Surabaya–Gresik Toll Road	Eastern terminus of Toll Road 11
East Java	Sidoarjo	Waru	33.00	20.51	Waru–Juanda Toll Road			
1.000 mi = 1.609 km; 1.000 km = 0.621 mi: Electronic toll collection; Incomplete access; Route transition

→=== Surabaya–Pasuruan–Banyuwangi section === The entire section is located in East Java.

Note: Note: Distance is measured from the start of Jakarta section, while exit number is measured from the start of Surabaya section

Regency	Location	km	mi	Exit	Name	Destinations	Notes
Sidoarjo	Taman	745	463	16 (758)	Waru Interchange	Waru; Waru–Juanda Toll Road; Surabaya–Mojokerto Toll Road	
Sidoarjo	Taman	745	463	Waru Utama Toll Gate (central toll gate heading into downtown Surabaya)			
Sidoarjo	Sidoarjo	756	470	28 (770)	Sidoarjo Toll Gate	Sidoarjo, Krian	
Sidoarjo	Tanggulangin	763	474	35 (777)	Tanggulangin Ramp	Tanggulangin, Porong	South-bound exit & North-bound entry only
Pasuruan	Gempol	769	478	Kejapanan Toll Gate (central toll gate from/to Gempol)			
Pasuruan	Gempol	769	478	41 (783)	Kejapanan Ramp	Kejapanan, Tanggulangin, Porong	South-bound entry & North-bound exit only
Pasuruan	Gempol	772	480	44 (786)	Gempol Toll Gate	Gempol, Jabon	
Pasuruan	Beji	775	482	47 (789)	Beji Interchange	Gempol–Pasuruan Toll Road	
Pasuruan	Beji	776	482	Gempol–Pandaan Toll Road			
Pasuruan	Beji	775	482	775 (789)	Beji Interchange	Surabaya–Gempol Toll Road – Sidoarjo, Surabaya; Gempol–Pandaan Toll Road – Pandaan, Malang	Western terminus
Pasuruan	Beji	782	486	782 (796)	Bangil Toll Gate	Bangil, Beji	
Pasuruan	Kraton	789	490	789 (803)	Rembang Toll Gate	Rembang, Industrial Complex, Kraton	
Pasuruan	Purworejo	796	495	796 (810)	Pasuruan Toll Gate	Pasuruan, Kejayan	
Pasuruan	Grati	809.4	502.9	809 (823)	Grati Toll Gate	Grati, Nguling	Eastern terminus
Pasuruan	Grati	810.1	503.4	Pasuruan–Probolinggo Toll Road			
Pasuruan	Grati	809.9	503.2	810 (824)	Grati Toll Gate	Grati, Nguling; Gempol–Pasuruan Toll Road	Western terminus
Pasuruan	Tongas	822.6	511.1	822 (836)	Tongas Toll Gate	Tongas, Wringinanom, Mount Bromo	
Probolinggo	Sumberasih	829.6	515.5	829 (843)	Probolinggo Barat Toll Gate	West Probolinggo, Bee Jay Bakau Resort, Mount Bromo	
Probolinggo	Leces	840.4	522.2	840 (854)	Probolinggo Timur Toll Gate	East Probolinggo, Lumajang	
Probolinggo	Gending	848.5	527.2	849 (863)	Gending Toll Gate	Gending	
Probolinggo	Gending	854.3	530.8	Probolinggo–Banyuwangi Toll Road (Planned)			
1.000 mi = 1.609 km; 1.000 km = 0.621 mi: Electronic toll collection; Incomplete access; Route transition

== See also ==
- List of toll roads in Indonesia
- North Coast Road (Java)
- Trans-Sumatra Toll Road (Sumatra)
