= Solo–Yogyakarta Toll Road =

Road in Indonesia

Solo-Yogyakarta Toll Road
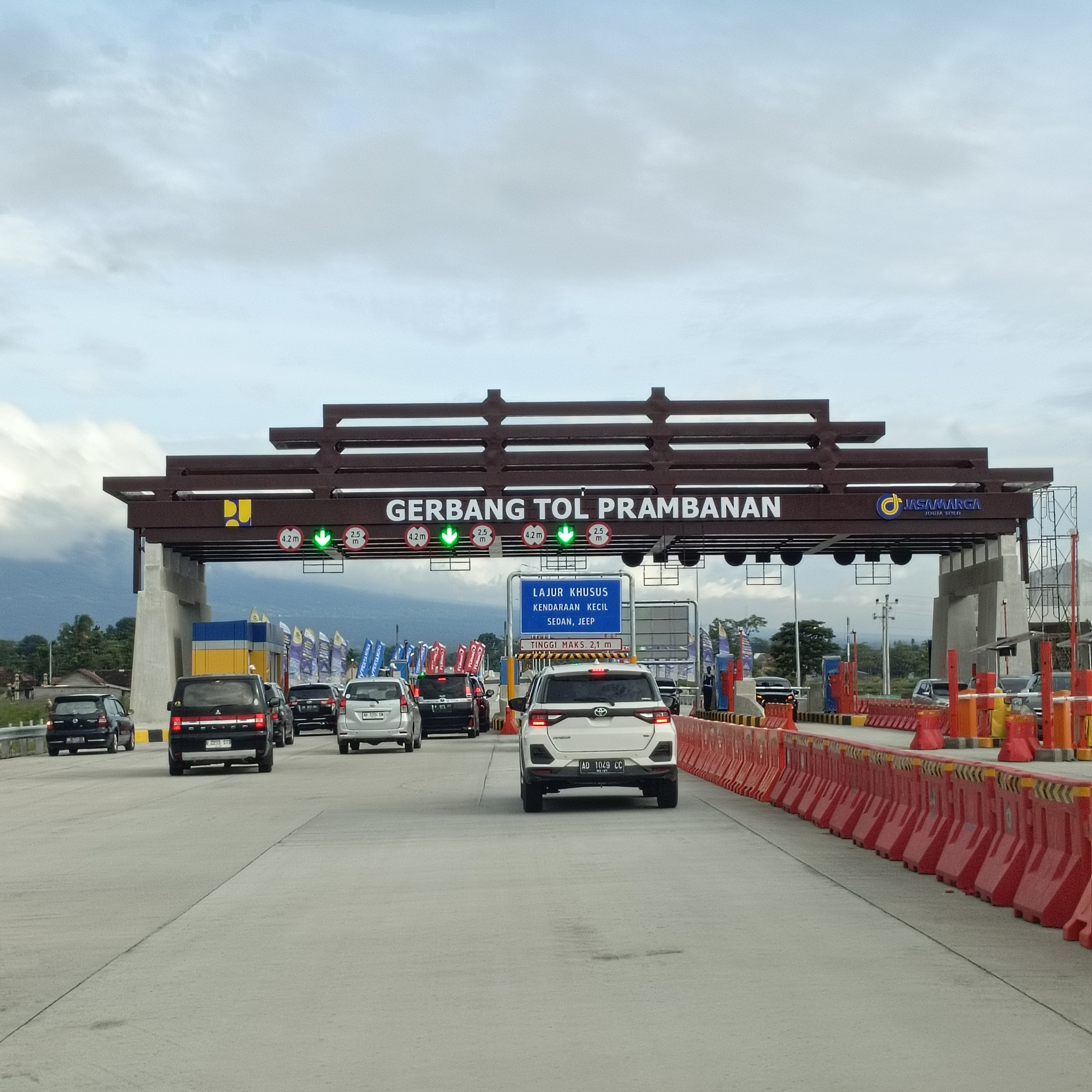
- Prambanan Toll Gate in 2024

Route information
- Maintained by PT Jasa Marga Jogja Solo
- Length: 96.57 km (60.01 mi)

Major junctions
- East end: Colomadu Junction, AH2 – Solo–Kertosono Toll Road
- West end: YIA Kulonprogo Junction

Location
- Country: Indonesia
- Major cities: Boyolali; Klaten; Sleman; Kulon Progo

Highway system
- Transport in Indonesia

The Solo–Yogyakarta–YIA Kulonprogo toll road or Joglo toll road is a controlled-access toll road under construction in Indonesia that connects Surakarta urban area in Central Java with Yogyakarta urban area in Special Region of Yogyakarta. The toll road is part of the Trans-Java Toll Road. Construction of this toll road has begun in 2020 from the direction of Solo. Despite its name, the toll road terminus will not located within Surakarta and Yogyakarta, but in nearby Boyolali Regency and Sleman Regency.

The toll road was built elevated along the Yogyakarta Northern Ring Road (except at the intersection of Jalan Nyi Tjondrolukito/Palagan Tentara Pelajar near Yogya Kembali Monument which will be made at-grade), then continues along the Mataram Canal until it reaches the interchange in the Maguwoharjo area. The toll road will continue to Yogyakarta International Airport (YIA) which stretches from the Sleman interchange for 30.77 km. It is expected that the toll road will facilitate access from YIA to Yogyakarta.

== History ==
To support the government's program in providing toll road infrastructure in the southern region of Java Island, PT. Jogjasolo Marga Makmur (PT. JMM) which is a Toll Road Business Entity (BUJT) a consortium of four companies, namely PT. Daya Mulia Turangga (DMT)–PT. Gamma Group–PT. Jasa Marga (Persero) Tbk and PT. Adhi Karya (Persero) Tbk (ADHI).

PT. Jogjasolo Marga Makmur has won the concession investment tender, and signed a toll road concession agreement contract for the Solo–Yogyakarta–YIA Kulon Progo section, with the Toll Road Regulatory Agency (BPJT) on 9 September 2020. The Solo–Yogyakarta–YIA Kulon Progo toll road section itself is one of the National Strategy Projects (PSN) based on Presidential Regulation No. 3 of 2016, Presidential Regulation No. 56 of 2018 and the latest amendment to Presidential Regulation No. 109 of 2020. The realization of the Solo–Yogyakarta–YIA–Kulon Progo toll road is considered special because it connects two cultural cities. namely Surakarta and Yogyakarta. In addition, this project has received high attention from the central government and regional governments because it is considered very strategic as a solution for mobility and distribution efficiency in the southern region of Java Island.

== Section ==
This toll road is divided into three, namely:

No	Toll section	Length
Section 1 (Kartasura–Purwomartani)		42.38 km
1	(Kartasura–Klaten)	22.30 km
2	(Klaten–Purwomartani)	20.08 km
Section 2 (Purwomartani–Gamping)		23.43 km
3	(Purwomartani–Monjali)	9.43 km
4	(Monjali–Gamping)	14.00 km
Section 3 (Gamping–Purworejo)		30.77 km
5	(Gamping–Wates)	17.45 km
6	(Wates–YIA Kulonprogo)	13.32 km

== Exits ==
Province	Location	km	mi	Exit	Name	Destinations	Notes
Central Java	Karanganyar Regency	0	0.0	0	Kartasura Interchange	Semarang–Solo Toll Road; Northwestbound; Boyolali; Salatiga; Semarang; Eastbound; Solo; Ngawi; Surabaya	
Central Java	Karanganyar Regency/ Boyolali Regency	0.9	0.56	2	Banyudono Toll Gate	Kartasura; Colomadu; Boyolali	
Central Java	Klaten Regency	12.3	7.6	13	Karanganom Toll Gate	Karanganom; Sidomulyo; Delanggu	
Central Java	Klaten Regency	22.3	13.9	22	Klaten/Polanharjo Toll Gate	Klaten; Jatinom	
Central Java	Klaten Regency	30.7	19.1	30	Jogonalan Toll Gate	Jogonalan; Manisrenggo; Prambanan	
Special Region of Yogyakarta	Sleman Regency	42.5	26.4	41	Purwomartani Toll Gate	Kalasan; Piyungan; Wonosari	
Special Region of Yogyakarta	Sleman Regency				Maguwoharjo Ramp	Maguwoharjo; Depok	Eastbound entry and westbound exit only
Special Region of Yogyakarta	Sleman Regency				UPNVY Ramp/Toll Gate	Seturan; Maguwoharjo	Westbound entry and eastbound exit only
Special Region of Yogyakarta	Sleman Regency				Monjali Ramp/Toll Gate	Jombor; Kaliurang; Tugu	Eastbound entry and westbound exit only
Special Region of Yogyakarta	Sleman Regency				Trihanggo Ramp/Toll Gate	Jombor; Trihanggo; Monjali	Westbound entry and eastbound exit only
Special Region of Yogyakarta	Sleman Regency				Sleman Junction	Bawen-Yogyakarta Toll Road; Sleman; Magelang; Semarang	
Special Region of Yogyakarta	Sleman Regency				Gamping Toll Gate	Gamping; Yogyakarta; Bantul	
Special Region of Yogyakarta	Kulon Progo Regency				Sentolo Toll Gate	Sentolo; Sedayu; Palbapang	
Special Region of Yogyakarta	Kulon Progo Regency				Wates Toll Gate	Wates	
Special Region of Yogyakarta	Kulon Progo Regency				YIA Toll Gate	Temon; Yogyakarta International Airport	
Special Region of Yogyakarta	Kulon Progo Regency			Yogyakarta–Cilacap Toll Road			
1.000 mi = 1.609 km; 1.000 km = 0.621 mi: Concurrency terminus; Electronic toll collection; Incomplete access; Route transition; Unopened
