= Vanessa Angel (Indonesian actress) =

Indonesian actress (1993–2021)

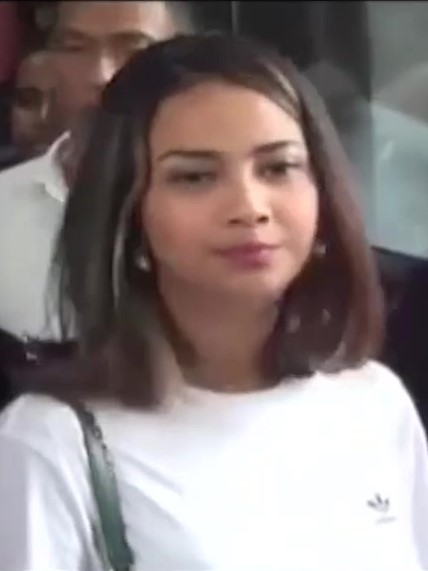
- Born: Vanesza Adzania; 21 December 1993; Jakarta, Indonesia
- Died: 4 November 2021 (aged 27); Jombang, East Java, Indonesia
- Resting place: Ulujami Islamic Public Cemetery
- Occupations: Actress, model and singer
- Years active: 2008–2021
- Spouse: Febri "Bibi" Andriansyah (m. 2020)
- Children: 1

Vanesza Adzania (21 December 1993 – 4 November 2021), better known by the stage name Vanessa Angel, was an Indonesian actress, model and singer.

On 24 November 2021, Vanessa Angel and husband died in a single-vehicle accident on the Jombang-Mojokerto Toll Road KM 672+400A.

== Early life ==
Vanessa Angel was born Vanesza Adzania on 21 December 1993 in Jakarta, Indonesia, as the eldest of two daughters of Doddy Sudrajat and Lucy Maywati.

She had a younger sister, Mayang Lucyana Fitri (b. 2003), and two younger paternal half-sisters, Nachika Septalia (b. 2005) and Aisyahqilla Nareswari Dewi Ramdhani (b. 2016). Her mother died from pulmonary embolism after giving birth to her sister at YPK Maternity Hospital in April 2003, and she was then raised by her paternal grandparents. In June 2004, her father claimed the hospital doctor, Dwiana Ocviyanti, had committed malpractice against her mother, but the claim was denied by the hospital.

== Career ==
Vanessa began her career as a model in teen magazines. In 2008, she played Sandra in Cinta Intan before appearing on MBA: Married By Accident opposite Nikita Willy and Marcell Darwin. She sang with Nicky Tirta and appeared in the music video alongside him for the song "Indah Cintaku" which was released in 2011. She then worked as a presenter and appeared in several television films, such as: Upik Abu Metropolitan (2012), Tukang Jamu Pembawa Cinta (2012), Heart Series 2 (2013), 3 Semprul Mengejar Cinta (2014), and Romansa Sopir Angkot Kece (2015).

== Personal life ==
Vanessa was married to Febri "Bibi" Ardiansyah on 11 January 2020. She announced the birth of their son via Instagram in July 2020.

=== Controversy ===
Vanessa was arrested in Surabaya on 6 January 2019 and was sentenced to 5 months in prison for prostitution-related charges after authorities found she had exchanged "electronic documents containing inappropriate materials" for money.

== Death ==
Vanessa and her husband were both killed in a car accident on the Kertosono–Mojokerto Toll Road in Jombang on Thursday, 4 November 2021, around 12.36 WIB. She was in a white Mitsubishi Pajero Sport with four other people: her husband, her child, a domestic assistant, and the driver. The car was heading to Surabaya. Vanessa had reportedly been asleep in the backseat not wearing a seatbelt when the crash occurred. Siska Lorensa, the family's nanny, sustained serious injuries, while the driver, Tubagus Joddy, and Vanessa's son suffered minor injuries.

The accident reportedly occurred because of driver negligence. Vanessa was thrown out of the car. The accident was confirmed true by East Java Police Street Patrol Unit chief Dwi Sumrahadi on 4 November 2021 around 14.00. After the accident, the 3 injured victims were brought to Kertosono Hospital, while the bodies of Vanessa and her husband were brought to Bhayangkara Surabaya Hospital.

Vanessa and Ardiansyah were buried side by side at TPU Ulujami, a cemetery in East Jakarta. They were survived by their son, Gala Sky Adriansyah.

== Filmography ==
Year	Title	Role	Ref
2008	Cinta Intan	Sandra Levina	
2008	MBA (Married by Accident)	Temi	
2009	Inayah	Rika	
2009	Jiran	Indah	
2010	SKJ (Seleb Kota Jogja)	Presenter	
2010	Taring	Farah	
2011	Upik Abu Metropolitan	Tara	
2012	Pohon Mangga Ajaib		
2012	Tukang Jamu Pembawa Cinta	Zaskia	
2012	Kendy + Dinar 100% Cinta		
2012	Rully Si Bruce Lee	Wina	
2012	Cinta Kan Membawamu Narik Angkot Lagi	Dewi	
2012	Kutukan Cinta		
2012	Layla Majnun	Layla	
2012	Karate & Salsa		
2012	Neng Geulis Pujaan Hati	Lilis	
2012	Bukan Sangkuriang	Kinar	
2013	Cewek Cantik Pasar Burung	Jamilah	
2013	Supir Taksi Naik Haji		
2013	Kujaga Garuda Atas Nama Cinta	Anissa	
2013	Tetanggaku Idolaku	Olive	
2013	Mantan Cap Galau	Naomi	
2013	Heart Series 2	Yunita Wulansari	
2013	My Lovely Charming Boss		
2013	Cinta Bikin Pewe		
2013	Supir Naik Pangkat	Fitri	
2014	Cari Cinta Lewat Blusukan	Novi	
2014	3 Sempruul Mengejar Surga 2	Dinda	
2014	Rahasia Pacar Cadangan		
2014	Mengejar Cinta Tukang Pos Cantik		
2014	Beauty in the Bus		
2014	Kepentok Cinta Cewek Hansip		
2014	Cinta Dibelakang Bak Truk		
2015	Romansa Sopir Angkot Kece	Mai	
2016	Rebutan Lapak Dihatiku	Sri	
2016	Cinta Diantar Pergi Pulang	Rani	
2017	Nadin	Nyi Roro	
2017	Sambalado		
2018	Gue yang PDKT, Lo yang Jadian		
2018	Seribu Kisah: Cantik Cantik Bikin Patah Hati		
2018	Papa Babysitter Mama Keder		
2018	Cintaku Asli 100%		
2018	Jodoh Wasiat Bapak	Hesty	
2018	Menembus Mata Bathin the Series	Cinta (ep 45); Vera (ep 94)	
