= Kanci–Pejagan Toll Road =

Toll road in Indonesia

- Jalan Tol Kanci–Pejagan
- Cijagan Toll Road
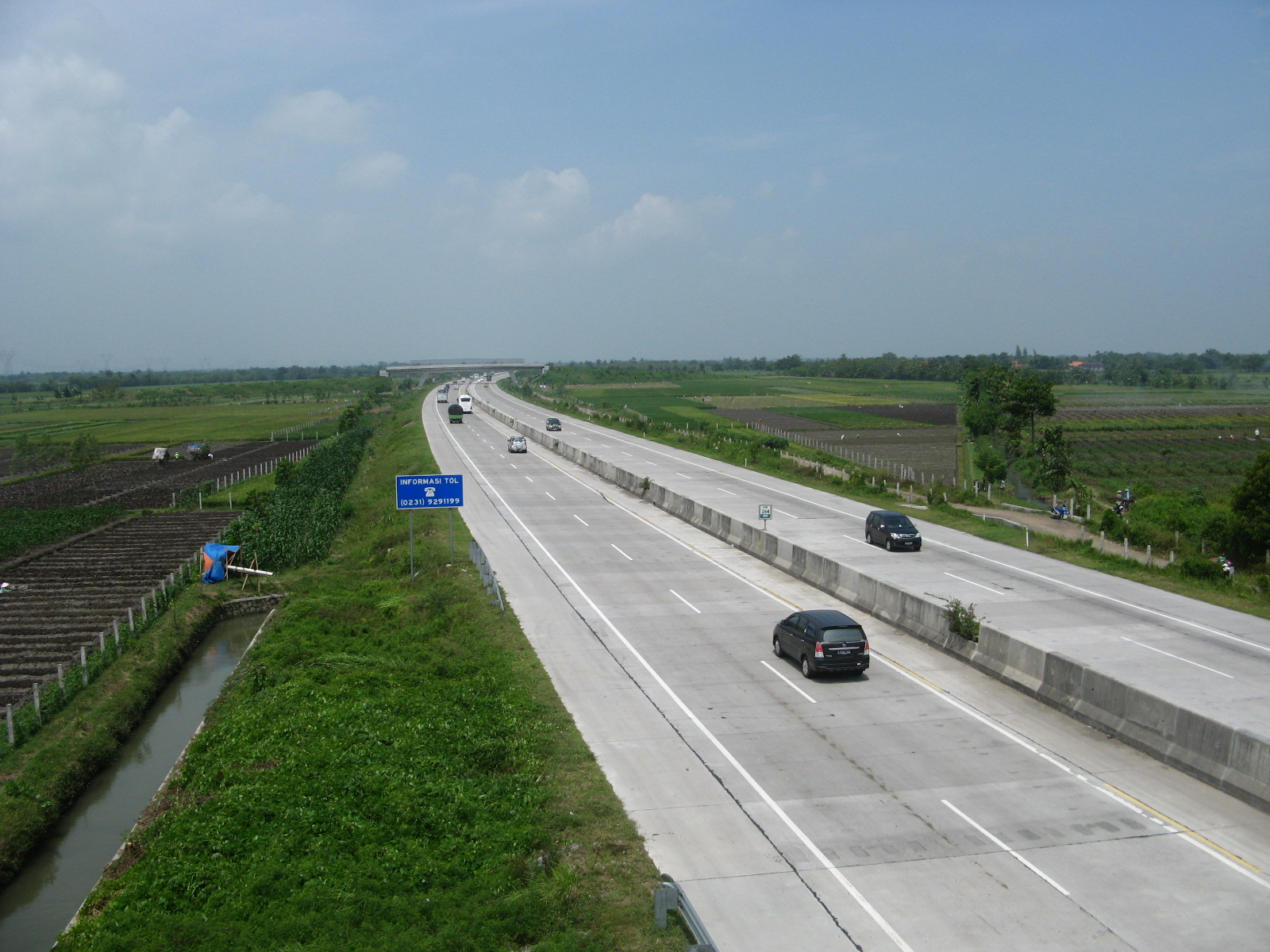
- Westbound Kanci–Pejagan Toll Road heading to Kanci, Cirebon Regency in 2011

Route information
- Part of AH2
- Maintained by: Semesta Marga Raya; Waskita Toll Road
- Length: 36 km (22 mi)
- Existed: 26 January 2010–present

Major junctions
- West end: Kanci
- AH2 – Palimanan–Kanci Toll Road; AH2 – Pejagan–Pemalang toll road
- East end: Pejagan

Location
- Country: Indonesia
- Provinces: West Java; Central Java
- Major cities: Cirebon Regency; Brebes Regency

Highway system
- Transport in Indonesia

The Kanci–Pejagan Toll Road is a controlled-access toll road in Indonesia connecting the village of Kanci in Cirebon Regency, West Java and the village of Pejagan in Brebes Regency, Central Java. It is part of the Trans-Java Toll Road and Indonesian National Route 1, and also a part of Asian Highway 2.

== History ==
The toll road was opened on 26 January 2010. The toll road was previously operated by Bakrie Toll Road. The length of this toll road is about 36 kilometres. In 2013, the toll is acquired by MNC Land and now operated by Waskita Toll Road.

== Exits ==
Note: The number on the exits is based on the distance from the western terminus of the Jakarta-Cikampek Toll Road, while the distance numbers are based on the distance from the western terminus of this toll road only

Province	Location	km	mi	Exit	Name	Destinations	Notes
West Java	Astanajapura, Cirebon Regency	0	0.0	214	Kanci Toll Gate	Kanci; Astanajapura; Palimanan–Kanci Toll Road	Western terminus
West Java	Ciledug, Cirebon Regency	18.35	11.40	233	Ciledug Toll Gate	Ciledug; Losari; Kuningan	
Central Java	Tanjung, Brebes Regency	33.57	20.86	247	Pejagan Toll Gate	Pejagan; Prupuk; Purwokerto; Cilacap	Eastern terminus
Central Java	Tanjung, Brebes Regency	33.70	20.94	Pejagan–Pemalang Toll Road			
1.000 mi = 1.609 km; 1.000 km = 0.621 mi: Route transition
