= Karangtengah =

Karangtengah Karang Tengah
- District
- Interactive map of Karangtengah
- Coordinates: 6.209390°S 106.709592°E
- Country: Indonesia
- Province: Banten
- Municipality: Tangerang City

Area
  - Total: 10.47 km^{2} (4.04 sq mi)

Population (mid 2023 estimate)
  - Total: 117,440
  - Density: 11,220/km^{2} (29,050/sq mi)
- Time zone: UTC+7 (WIB)

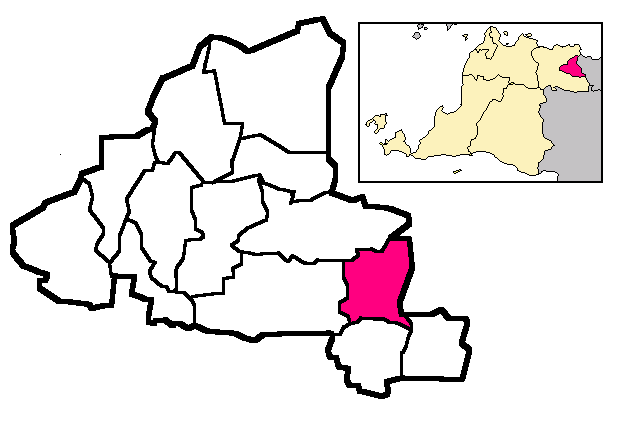
Locator Kecamatan Karangtengah di Kota Tangerang

Karangtengah (or Central Karang) is a town and an administrative district (kecamatan) of Tangerang City, in Banten Province of Indonesia, on the island of Java (not to be confused with other districts of the same name in Garut Regency, Cianjur Regency, Wonogiri Regency and Demak Regency). The district covers an area of 10.47 km^{2}, and had a population of 118,473 at the 2010 Census and 117,721 at the 2020 Census; the official estimate as at mid 2023 was 117,440.

Karangtengah Will Have the future MRT Jakarta East - West Line, connecting Cikarang to Balaraja. MRT Jakarta EWL Phase 2 Kembangan - Balaraja will be built in 2027.

== Communities ==
Karangtengah District is sub-divided into seven urban communities (kelurahan), listed below with their areas and their officially-estimated populations as at mid 2022, together with their postcodes.

Kode Wilayah	Name of kelurahan	Area in km^{2}	Population mid 2022 estimate	Post code
36.71.12.1001	Karang Tengah (town)	1.09	28,465	15157
36.71.12.1002	Karang Mulya	1.36	14,987	15157
36.71.12.1003	Pondok Bahar	1.06	14,174	15159
36.71.12.1004	Pondok Pucung	1.19	13,535	15158
36.71.12.1005	Karang Timur	1.31	17,966	15157
36.71.12.1006	Pedurenan	0.95	19,837	15159
36.71.12.1007	Parung Jaya	1.19	6,814	15159
36.71.12	Totals	8.14	115,778 ^{(a)}	

Notes: (a) comprising 57,942 males and 57,836 females.

== Toll Road Access ==
The Jakarta–Merak Toll Road crosses this district, connecting Jakarta to the Port of Merak in the northwest of Banten Province.

Toll Road	Toll Gate	KM
Jakarta–Tangerang Toll Road	Karang Tengah Barat	11

== Public Transport ==
- BRT Transjakarta: to Tegal Mampang at CBD Ciledug
- Bus Trans Tangerang Ayo: TT3 CBD Ciledug–Tangcity Mall

In the future, Karang Tengah will be connected to the Jakarta MRT East-West Line connecting Cikarang in the east and Balaraja in the west. Karang Tengah will have one MRT station at the Karang Tengah toll gate, specifically at Metland Cybercity and Puri 11.
