= Surya Semesta Internusa =

Indonesian construction and civil engineering company

PT Surya Semesta Internusa Tbk
- Formerly: PT Multi Investments Limited (1971–1995)
- Type: Public
- Traded as: IDX: SSIA
- Industry: Construction, Property development
- Founded: 15 June 1971; 55 years ago
- Headquarters: Jakarta, Indonesia
- Key people: Johannes Suriadjaja (President)
- Revenue: ▲ Rp 3.796 trillion (2016)
- Net income: ▲ Rp 100.854 billion (2016)
- Total assets: ▲ Rp 3.352 trillion (2016)
- Total equity: ▲Rp 146.813 trillion (2016)
- Number of employees: 3,198 (2016)
- Website: www.suryainternusa.com/en/

PT Surya Semesta Internusa Tbk is an Indonesian publicly traded construction company. Surya Semesta Internusa operates in three related sectors: property development and management, construction and hospitality.

The company operates in each sector through numerous subsidiaries including PT Suryacipta Swadaya (SCS), PT TCP Internusa (TCP) and PT Sitiagung Makmur (SAM). TCP develops Tanjung Mas Raya, a residential complex in Jakarta, Indonesia and manages Graha Surya Internusa, a commercial building in Kuningan; SAM develops Banyan Tree Ungasan Resort in Bali. PT Nusa Raya Cipta Tbk. is the main construction subsidiary. PT Suryalaya Anindita International, PT Ungasan Semesta Resort and PT Surya Internusa Hotels are its hospitality subsidiaries.

In July 2015, Suriadjaja began proceedings to buy out the Rajawali Group's stake in Nusantara Infrastructure in order to expand the company's toll road business. In August 2015, Surya Semesta Internusa delayed a US$200 million bond issue due to low demand. In February 2016, Surya Semesta posted a net profit of Rp265 bn, down from the previous year. In April 2016, Surya Semesta Internusa, together with other major hotel chains in Indonesia, reported poor performance due to low occupancy rates. The property development division also reported poor sales due to a sluggish real estate market. As of April 2016, the market capitalization of Surya Semesta Internusa was Rp 3.4 tn (US$250 million).

Surya Semesta Internusa also operates an investment division which holds stakes in other companies through PT Enercon Paradhya International.

The president of Surya Semesta Internusa since 2001 has been Johannes Suriadjaja.

== See also ==
- Valencia Hotel Group
