= Pasuruan–Probolinggo Toll Road =

Toll road in East Java

- Jalan Tol Pasuruan–Probolinggo
- Paspro Toll Road
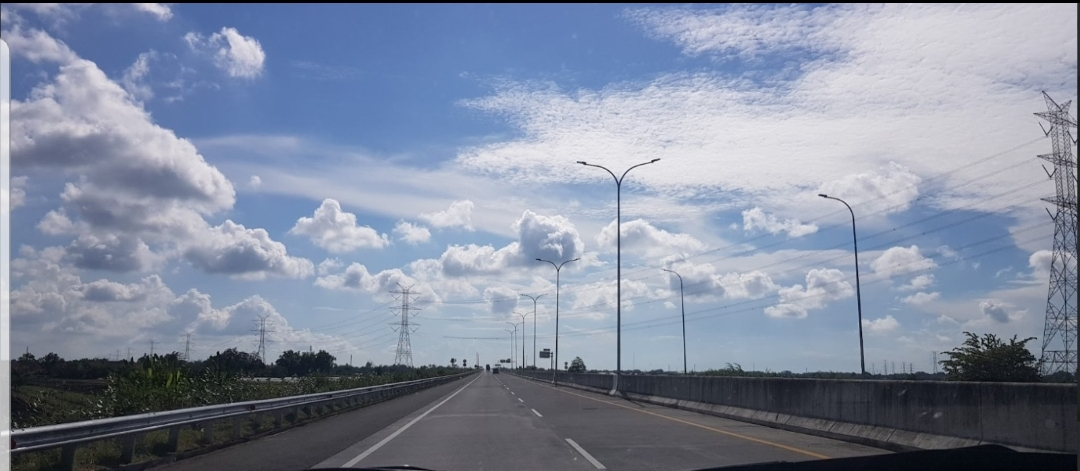
- Westbound Pasuruan–Probolinggo Toll Road heading to Pasuruan Regency in 2023

Route information
- Part of AH2
- Maintained by PT Trans Jawa Paspro Jalan Tol (TJPJT)
- Length: 38.3 km (23.8 mi)
- Existed: 2018–present

Major junctions
- West end: Grati
- AH2 – Gempol–Pasuruan Toll Road; AH2 – Probolinggo–Banyuwangi Toll Road (In progress)
- East end: Gending

Location
- Country: Indonesia
- Provinces: East Java
- Major cities: Pasuruan Regency; Probolinggo Regency

Highway system
- Transport in Indonesia

Pasuruan–Probolinggo Toll Road or Paspro Toll Road is a controlled-access toll road in East Java, Indonesia. This 38.3 kilometers (23.8 mi) highway connects Pasuruan with Probolinggo. The toll road is operational since the end of 2018.

== Sections ==
The Paspro toll road project consists of three sections,

- Section I: 13.5 kilometers (8.4 mi) from Grati, Pasuruan Regency to Tongas, Probolinggo Regency.
- Section II: 6.9 kilometers (4.3 mi) between Tongas and Western Probolinggo city.
- Section III is 10.9 kilometers (6.8 mi) long, starting from Western Probolinggo to Eastern Probolinggo.

== Exits ==
Province	Location	km	mi	Exit	Name	Destinations	Notes
East Java	Grati, Pasuruan Regency	809.9	503.2	810 (824)	Grati Toll Gate	Grati; Nguling; Gempol–Pasuruan Toll Road	Western terminus
East Java	Tongas, Pasuruan Regency	822.6	511.1	822 (836)	Tongas Toll Gate	Tongas; Wringinanom; Mount Bromo	
East Java	Sumberasih, Probolinggo Regency	829.6	515.5	829 (843)	Probolinggo Barat Toll Gate	West Probolinggo; Bee Jay Bakau Resort; Mount Bromo	
East Java	Leces, Probolinggo Regency	840.4	522.2	840 (854)	Probolinggo Timur Toll Gate	East Probolinggo; Lumajang	
East Java	Gending, Probolinggo Regency	848.5	527.2	849 (863)	Gending Toll Gate	Gending	
East Java	Gending, Probolinggo Regency	854.3	530.8	Probolinggo–Banyuwangi Toll Road (Planned)			
East Java	1.000 mi = 1.609 km; 1.000 km = 0.621 mi: Route transition						

== See also ==
- Trans-Java Toll Road
