= Solo–Kertosono Toll Road =

Toll Road in Indonesia

- Jalan Tol Solo–Kertosono
- Soker Toll Road
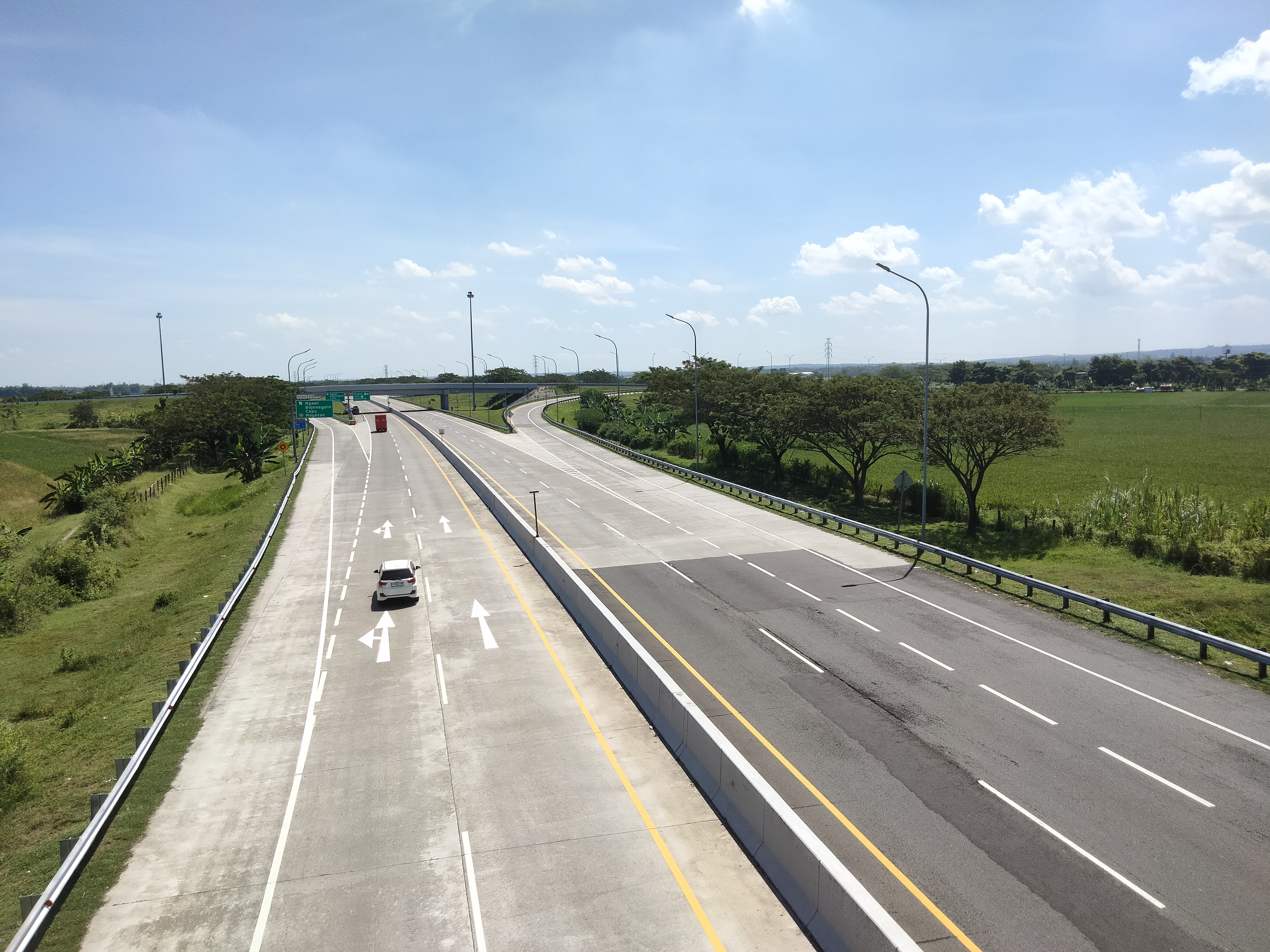
- Solo-Kertosono Toll Road as taken from Ngawi Exit

Route information
- Part of AH2
- Maintained by PT Jasamarga Solo Ngawi and PT Jasamarga Ngawi Kertosono Kediri (PT Jasa Marga Tbk and PT Waskita Toll Road (Waskita Karya))
- Length: 177 km (110 mi)

Major junctions
- West end: Solo
- AH2 – Semarang–Solo Toll Road; Solo–Yogyakarta Toll Road; AH2 – Kertosono–Mojokerto Toll Road
- East end: Kertosono

Location
- Country: Indonesia
- Provinces: Central Java; East Java
- Major cities: Boyolali; Karanganyar; Surakarta; Sragen; Ngawi (regency); Ngawi; Madiun; Nganjuk; Jombang

Highway system
- Transport in Indonesia

Solo–Kertosono Toll Road (Soker Toll Road) is a controlled-access toll road in Central Java, Indonesia. The toll road connects to Semarang–Solo Toll Road in the west, and in the east it connects to Kertosono–Mojokerto Toll Road. This toll road has a total length of 177.12 km comprise two segments, segment Solo–Ngawi and segment Ngawi–Kertosono. The road passes through eight regions: Boyolali Regency, Karanganyar Regency, Solo City, Sragen Regency in Central Java Province, and Ngawi in Ngawi Regency, and Madiun, Nganjuk, Jombang Regency in East Java Province. When commencing operation, Solo–Kertosono Toll Road, known as Soker Toll Road. The toll road is the longest toll road in Indonesia.

== History ==
Administratively, Soker Toll Road with a total length of 177.12 km comprise two segments, segment Solo–Mantingan–Ngawi and segment Ngawi–Kertosono. The length of Solo–Mantingan–Ngawi toll road is 90.1 kilometer, while the length of Ngawi–Kertosono is 87.02 kilometer. Hence, in the beginning, Soker Toll Road was designed as two separate toll roads. However, during its tender process, no investors showed interest in bidding these two toll roads except one bidder, which is PT Thiess Contractors Indonesia. On 28 June 2011, Toll Road Concession Agreement (PPJT) amendment has been signed in Jakarta. With this concession agreement, segment Solo-Mantingan-Ngawi will be under PT Solo–Ngawi Jaya, while segment Ngawi-Kertosono will be under PT Ngawi–Kertosono Jaya. Both of this companies are subsidiaries of PT Thiess Contractors Indonesia. Since both of toll road concessions have been awarded to the same company, these two toll roads usually are referred as Solo–Kertosono Toll Road, or Soker Toll Road. Construction started in 2012 and the company aimed to finish the project in 2014, but the company was only able to acquire 80 percent of the needed land. The construction has been left idle due to financing and land clearing difficulties. Then State-run toll road operator Jasa Marga and state-owned construction company Waskita Karya taken over from Thiess Contractors in 2015, with about Rp 439 billion (US$34.15 million). Jasa Marga now owns 60 percent of the shares in the project, while Waskita Karya owns the remaining 40 percent.

== Segments ==
Soker Toll Road with a total length of 177.12 km comprise two segments,

=== Solo–Ngawi ===
This 90 km length segment namely Phase I, the SS Ngawi-Klitik (Ngawi) segment as long as 4 km has been operating since 30 March 2018, Phase II Kartasura-Sragen was inaugurated on 15 July 2018, and Phase III Sragen-Ngawi was inaugurated on 28 November in the same year. The Sragen- Ngawi Toll Road is equipped with eight toll gates (GT), namely GT Colomadu, GT Adi Airport, GT Ngemplak, GT Gondangrejo, GT Karanganyar, GT Sragen, East Sragen GT, and GT Ngawi (Ngawi City).

=== Ngawi–Kertosono ===
This segment is 87.12 km in length with 2 sections. The 52-kilometer (km)-long section Ngawi-Wilangan was inaugurated in March 2018, which has four toll gates at Ngawi, Madiun, Mejayan, and Wilangan. The remaining part was inaugurated on 20 December 2018.

== Exits ==
=== Solo-Ngawi ===
| Province | Location | km | mi | Exit | Name | Destinations | Notes |
|---|---|---|---|---|---|---|---|
| Central Java | Colomadu, Karanganyar Regency | 0 | 0.0 | 493 (507) | Colomadu Toll Gate | Kartasura; Klaten; Yogyakarta; Semarang–Solo Toll Road; Solo–Yogyakarta Toll Road | Western terminus |
| Central Java | Ngemplak, Boyolali Regency | 5.15 | 3.20 | 498 (512) | Adi Sumarmo Airport Toll Gate | Adisumarmo International Airport | |
| Central Java | Ngemplak, Boyolali Regency | 11.44 | 7.11 | 504 (518) | Ngemplak Toll Gate | Solo | |
| Central Java | Gondangrejo, Karanganyar Regency | 13.92 | 8.65 | 506 (520) | Gondangrejo Toll Gate | Mojosongo; Gondangrejo; Purwodadi; Solo | |
| Central Java | Kebakkramat, Karanganyar Regency | 21.71 | 13.49 | 513 (527) | Karanganyar Toll Gate | Palur; Karanganyar; Tawangmangu | |
| Central Java | Sidoharjo, Sragen Regency | 35.59 | 22.11 | 527 (541) | Sragen Toll Gate | Sragen; Gemolong; Purwodadi | |
| Central Java | Sambungmacan, Sragen Regency | 52.19 | 32.43 | 544 (558) | East Sragen Toll Gate | Mantingan; Gendingan; Purwodadi | |
| East Java | Ngawi, Ngawi Regency | 86.77 | 53.92 | 579 (593) | Ngawi Toll Gate | Ngawi; Cepu; Magetan | |
| East Java | Ngawi, Ngawi Regency | 86.80 | 53.94 | Ngawi–Kertosono Toll Road | | | |
1.000 mi = 1.609 km; 1.000 km = 0.621 mi: Route transition

=== Ngawi-Kertosono ===
| Province | Location | km | mi | Exit | Name | Destinations | Notes |
|---|---|---|---|---|---|---|---|
| East Java | Ngawi, Ngawi Regency | 0 | 0.0 | 579 (593) | Ngawi Toll Gate | Ngawi; Cepu; Magetan; Solo–Ngawi Toll Road | |
| East Java | Madiun, Madiun Regency | 23.63 | 14.68 | 602 (616) | Madiun Toll Gate | Madiun Regency; Madiun; Magetan; Ponorogo | |
| East Java | Balerejo, Madiun Regency | 32.16 | 19.98 | 611 (625) | Caruban Toll Gate | Caruban; Karangjati | |
| East Java | Sukomoro, Nganjuk Regency | 67.83 | 42.15 | 646 (660) | Nganjuk Toll Gate | Nganjuk; Kediri; Blitar | |
| East Java | Bandarkedungmulyo, Jombang Regency | 93.12 | 57.86 | 672 (686) | Bandar Toll Gate | Kertosono; Kediri | Eastern terminus |
| East Java | Bandarkedungmulyo, Jombang Regency | 94.0 | 58.4 | Kertosono–Mojokerto Toll Road | | | |
1.000 mi = 1.609 km; 1.000 km = 0.621 mi: Route transition
