= Kertosono–Mojokerto Toll Road =

Toll road in East Java, Indonesia

- Jalan Tol Kertosono–Mojokerto
- Moker Toll Road
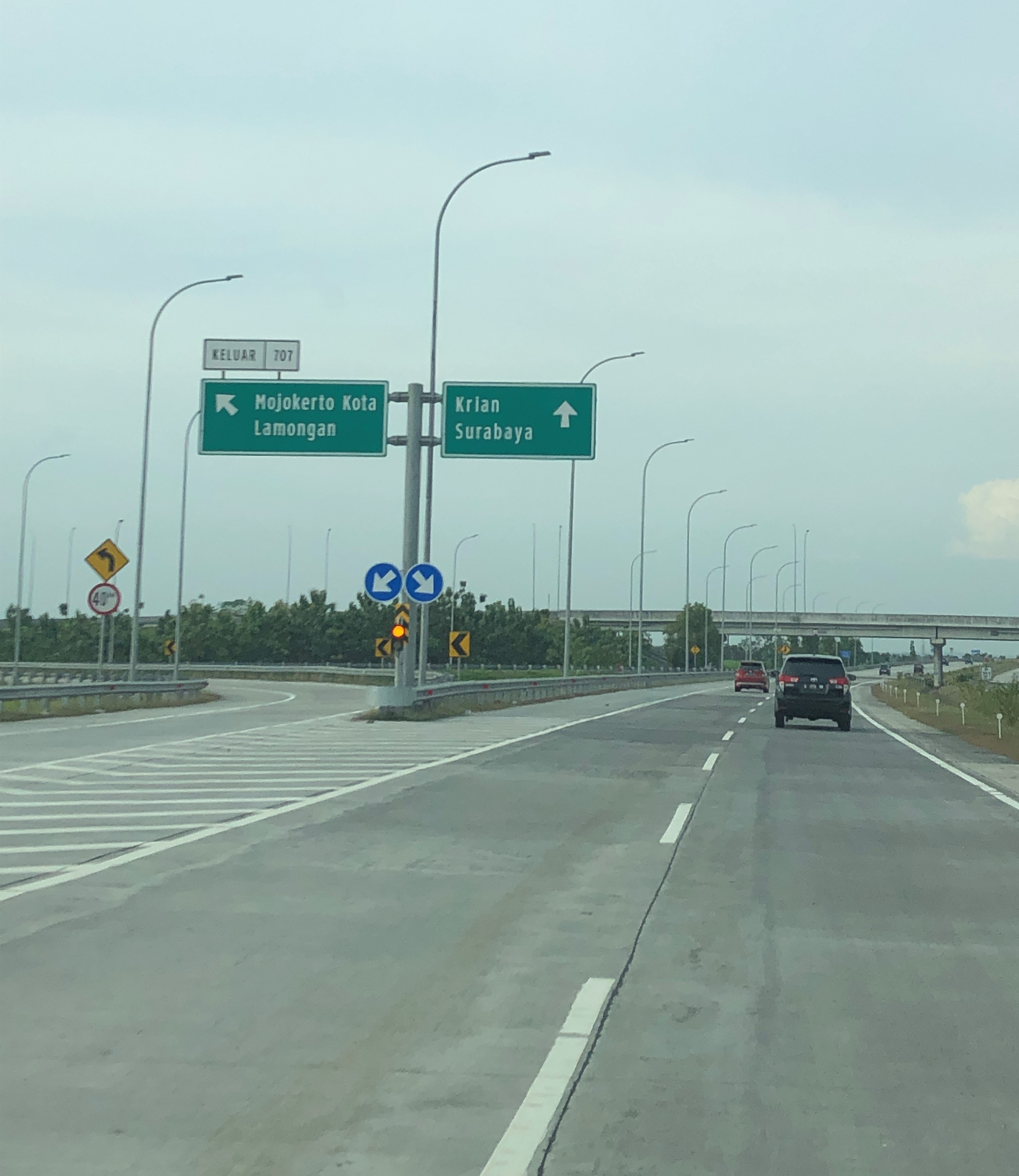
- Kertosono-Mojokerto Toll Road at Mojokerto Barat exit.

Route information
- Part of AH2
- Maintained by PT Marga Harjaya Infrastruktur
- Length: 40.5 km (25.2 mi)

Major junctions
- West end: Kertosono
- AH2 – Solo–Kertosono Toll Road; AH2 – Surabaya–Mojokerto Toll Road
- East end: Mojokerto

Location
- Country: Indonesia
- Major cities: Jombang Regency; Mojokerto Regency

Highway system
- Transport in Indonesia

Kertosono–Mojokerto toll road is a controlled-access toll road in the island of Java, Indonesia. It is located in East Java province. It is part of Trans-Java Toll Road and runs from Kertosono to Mojokerto.

The first 14-kilometre-long (8.7 mi) phase of this toll road connecting Jombang with Bandar Kedungmulyo was opened in October 2014, while the 5-kilometre-long (3.1 mi) Section 3 connecting Mojokerto Barat with Mojokerto started operation in December 2016. The 19.9-kilometre-long (12.4 mi) Section 2 links Kedunglosari-Tembelang-Jombang Village with the Pageruyung-Gedeg Village-Mojokerto District, as well as Section 4. Section 4 connects with the Solo-Kertosono Toll Road, stretching between Gondangmanis and Brodot in Bandar Kedungmulyo, Jombang. This section was inaugurated by Indonesian President Joko Widodo on 10 September 2017.

== Sections ==
The toll road has following sections,

- Section 1: 14 kilometers (8.7 mi), connecting Jombang with Bandar Kedungmulyo.
- Section 2: 19.9 kilometers (12.4 mi), between Kedunglosari-Tembelang-Jombang Village to Pageruyung-Gedeg Village-Mojokerto District,
- Section 3: 5 kilometers (3.1 mi), connecting Mojokerto Regency with Mojokerto city,
- Section 4: Gondangmanis to Brodot, connecting Solo-Kertosono Toll Road.

== Exits ==
Province	Location	km	mi	Exit	Name	Destinations	Notes
East Java	Bandarkedungmulyo, Jombang Regency	0	0.0	672 (686)	Bandar Toll Gate	Kertosono; Kediri; Solo–Kertosono Toll Road	Western terminus
East Java	Tembelang, Jombang Regency	14.41	8.95	686 (700)	Jombang Toll Gate	Jombang; Ploso	
East Java	Gedeg, Mojokerto Regency	34.55	21.47	707 (721)	Mojokerto Barat Toll Gate	Gedeg; Mojokerto; Lamongan	
East Java	Jetis, Mojokerto Regency	39.84	24.76	712 (726)	Penompo Toll Gate	Mojokerto	Eastern terminus
East Java	Jetis, Mojokerto Regency	40.00	24.85	Surabaya–Mojokerto Toll Road			
1.000 mi = 1.609 km; 1.000 km = 0.621 mi: Route transition

== Incidents ==
On 4 November 2021, there was a traffic collision in Jombang Regency that resulted in the death of Vanessa Angel along with her husband, Febri "Bibi" Andriansyah.
