= Gempol–Pasuruan Toll Road =

Toll road in East Java

- Jalan Tol Gempol–Pasuruan
- Gempas Toll Road
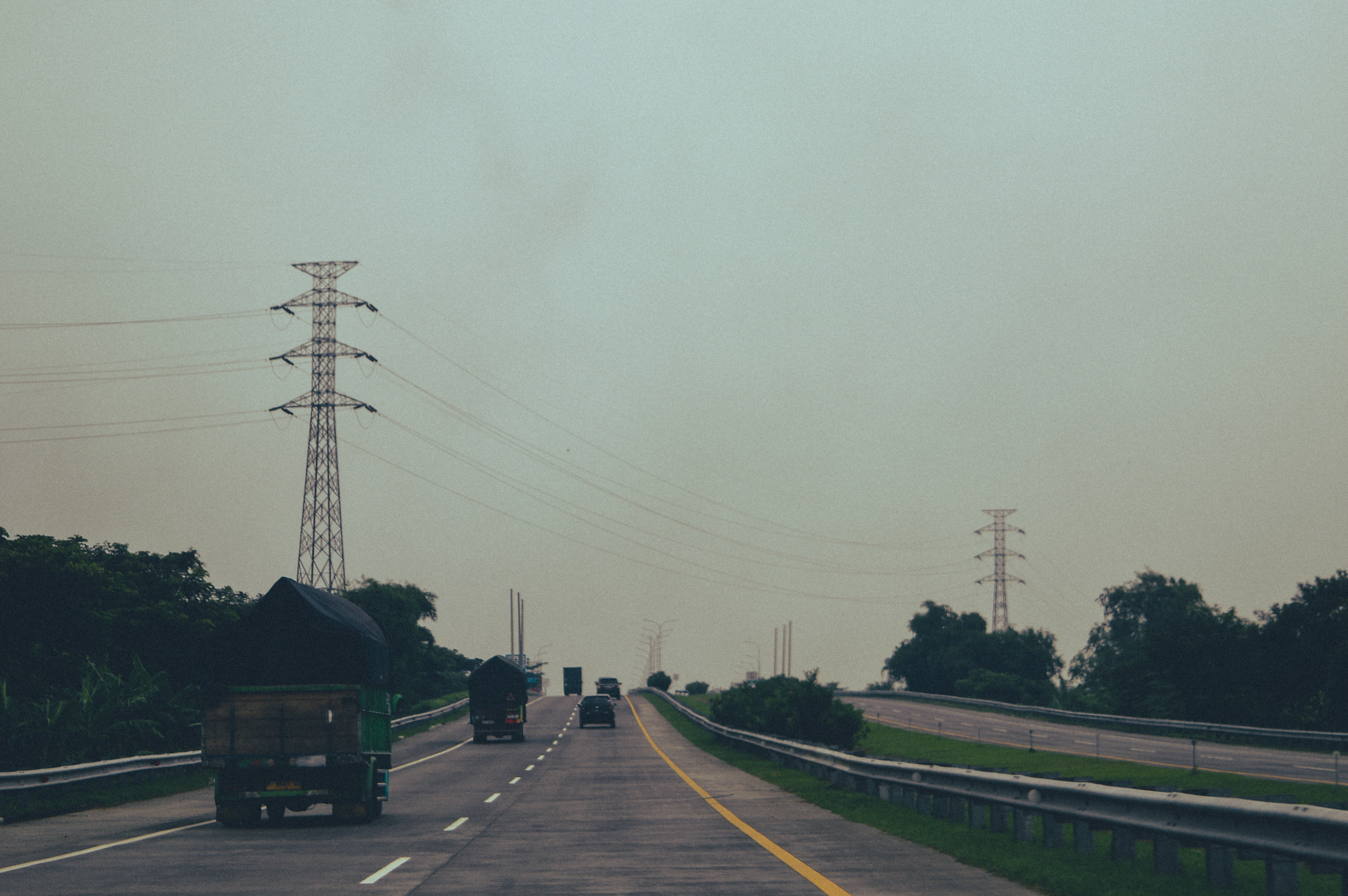
- Gempol–Pasuruan Toll Road in 2024

Route information
- Part of AH2
- Maintained by PT Jasamarga Gempol Pasuruan
- Length: 34 km (21 mi)
- Existed: 2018–present

Major junctions
- West end: Beji Interchange
- Gempol-Pandaan Toll Road; AH2 – Surabaya–Porong Toll Road; AH2 – Pasuruan-Probolinggo Toll Road
- East end: Grati

Location
- Country: Indonesia
- Major cities: Pasuruan Regency; Pasuruan

Highway system
- Transport in Indonesia

Gempol-Pasuran Toll Road or Gempas Toll Road is a controlled-access toll road in East Java, Indonesia. This 34.15 kilometers (21.22 mi) highway connects Gempol with Pasuruan. It is the easternmost part Trans-Java Expressway.

== History ==
On 31 March 2017, Section IB from Bangil to Rembang has been opened, and on 3 August 2017, Section IIA from Gempol to Bangil has been opened. Section II from Rembang to Pasuruan has formally opened on 22 June 2018. The remaining part of the toll road was inaugurated on 20 December 2018.

== Sections ==
It consists of three sections:

- Section I: Gempol–Rembang, is 13.9 kilometres (8.6 mi);
- Section II: Rembang–Pasuruan, is 6.6 kilometres (4.1 mi); and
- Section III: Pasuruan-Grati, is 13.65 kilometres (8.48 mi).

== Exits ==
Province	Location	km	mi	Exit	Name	Destinations	Notes
East Java	Beji, Pasuruan Regency	775	482	775 (789)	Beji Interchange	Northbound; Surabaya–Gempol Toll Road; Sidoarjo; Surabaya; Southbound; Gempol–Pandaan Toll Road; Pandaan; Malang	Western terminus
East Java	Beji, Pasuruan Regency	782	486	782 (796)	Bangil Toll Gate	Bangil; Beji	
East Java	Kraton, Pasuruan Regency	789	490	789 (803)	Rembang Toll Gate	Rembang; Industrial Complex; Kraton	
East Java	Purworejo, Pasuruan	796	495	796 (810)	Pasuruan Toll Gate	Pasuruan; Kejayan	
East Java	Grati, Pasuruan Regency	809.4	502.9	809 (823)	Grati Toll Gate	Grati; Nguling	Eastern terminus
East Java	Grati, Pasuruan Regency	810.1	503.4	Pasuruan–Probolinggo Toll Road			
1.000 mi = 1.609 km; 1.000 km = 0.621 mi: Route transition
