= Thiess Contractors Indonesia =

Company of Indonesia

- Type: Subsidiary
- Industry: Civil engineering, Construction, Mining
- Founded: 1988
- Headquarters: South Quarter, Jakarta, Indonesia
- Parent: Thiess
- Website: www.thiess.com

PT Thiess Contractors Indonesia is a subsidiary of Thiess.

== History ==
Thiess commenced operations in Indonesia in 1972 when it acquired a 50% in Petrosea. After Thiess was taken over by CSR in 1980, the overseas operations including Indonesia operations were sold to Leighton Contractors.

Thiess re-entered the Indonesian market when Thiess Contractors Indonesia was established in 1988 and, working in a joint venture with PT Mintekindo Utama Into, started undertaking mining activities. Its first major mining contract was awarded in March 1989 by BHP at Senakin Mine in East Kalimantan.

== Ownership ==
As at June 2025, Thiess held a 95% shareholding in Thiess Contractors Indonesia.
