= Palimanan–Kanci Toll Road =

Toll Road in Indonesia

- Jalan Tol Palimanan–Kanci
- Palikanci Toll Road
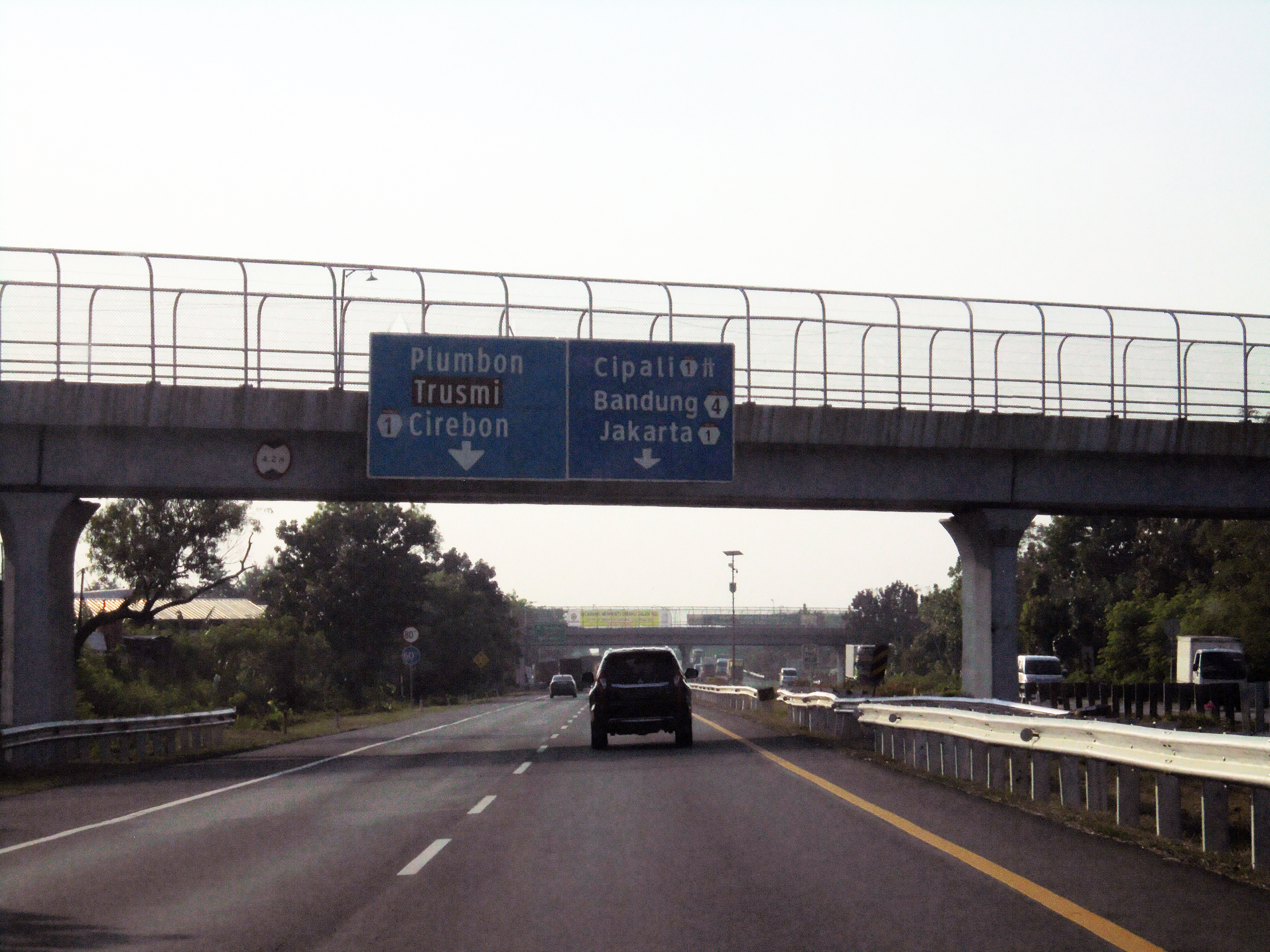
- Palimanan–Kanci Toll Road heading westbound towards Palimanan, Cirebon Regency in 2022.

Route information
- Part of AH2
- Maintained by Jasa Marga Palimanan-Kanci (PT Jasa Marga Tbk)
- Length: 28.8 km (17.9 mi)
- Existed: January 24, 1998–present

Major junctions
- West end: Palimanan
- AH2 – Cikopo–Palimanan Toll Road; AH2 – Kanci–Pejagan Toll Road
- East end: Kanci IC

Location
- Country: Indonesia
- Major cities: Cirebon Regency

Highway system
- Transport in Indonesia

Palikanci, abbreviation from Palimanan–Kanci Toll Road is a controlled-access toll road located in the city of Cirebon, West Java in Indonesia. This toll road has been operating since 1998. Palikanci Toll Road is operated by PT Jasa Marga Tbk.

== Exits ==
Note: The number on the exits is based on the distance from the western terminus of the Jakarta-Cikampek Toll Road, while the distance numbers are based on the distance from the western terminus of this toll road only

Province	Location	km	mi	Exit	Name	Destinations	Notes
West Java	Palimanan, Cirebon Regency	0	0.0	188	Palimanan Toll Gate	Palimanan; Jatibarang; Indramayu; Cikopo–Palimanan Toll Road	Western terminus
West Java	Plumbon, Cirebon Regency	6.38	3.96	194	Plumbon Toll Gate	Plumbon; Plered; Trusmi	
West Java	Talun, Cirebon Regency	15.22	9.46	203	Ciperna Toll Gate	Ciperna; Cirebon; Kuningan	
West Java	Astanajapura, Cirebon Regency	26.16	16.26	214	Kanci Toll Gate	Kanci; Astanajapura	Eastern terminus
West Java	Astanajapura, Cirebon Regency	26.30	16.34	Kanci–Pejagan Toll Road			
1.000 mi = 1.609 km; 1.000 km = 0.621 mi: Route transition

== See also ==
- Transport in Indonesia
