= Semarang–Solo Toll Road =

Toll Road in Indonesia

Semarang–Solo Toll Road
- Jalan Tol Semarang–Solo
- Somar Toll Road
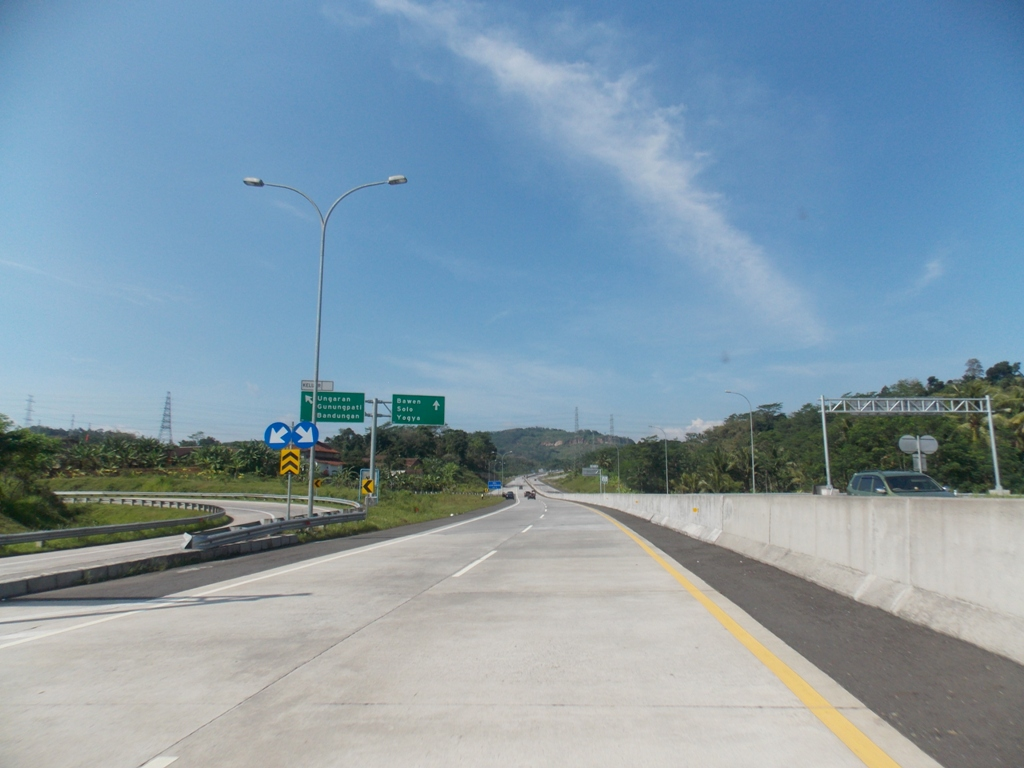
- Southbound Semarang–Solo Toll Road heading to Bawen, Semarang Regency in 2014

Route information
- Part of AH2
- Maintained by PT Trans Marga Jateng (PT Jasa Marga Tbk, Astra Infra, PT Sarana Pembangunan Jawa Tengah (a Central Java government REIT))
- Length: 72.64 km (45.14 mi)
- Existed: 2009–present

Major junctions
- North end: Semarang
- Semarang Toll Road; Bawen–Yogyakarta Toll Road (planned); AH2 – Solo–Kertosono Toll Road
- South end: Surakarta

Location
- Country: Indonesia
- Major cities: Semarang; Semarang Regency; Salatiga; Boyolali Regency; Surakarta

Highway system
- Transport in Indonesia

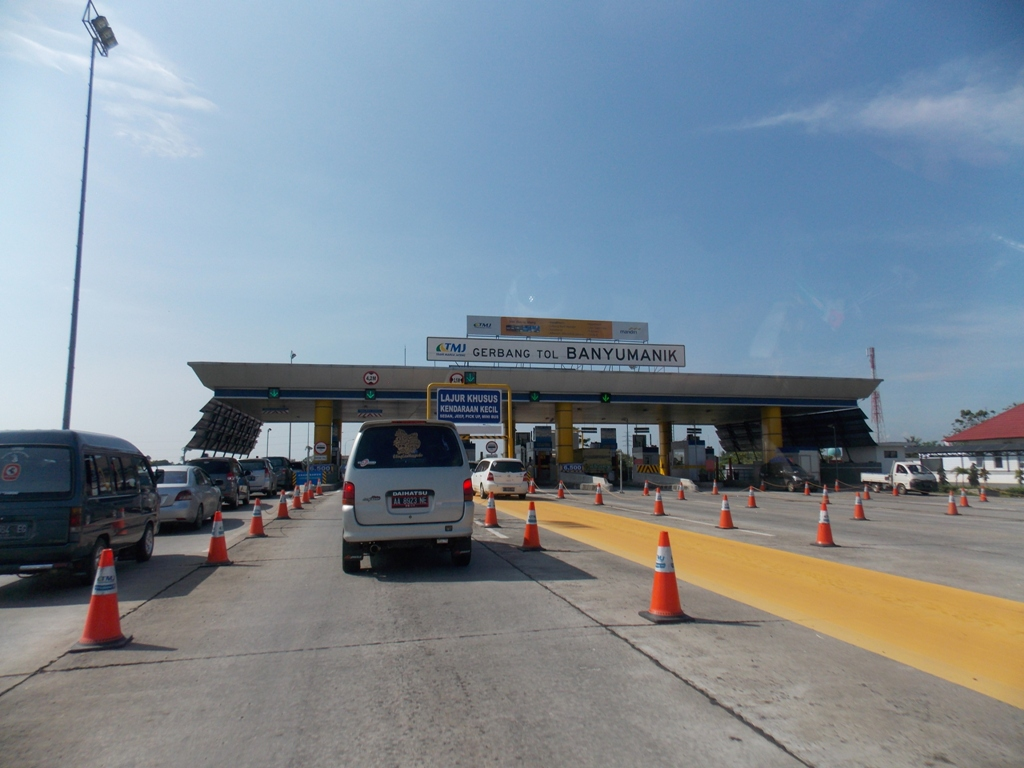
Banyumanik Toll Plaza

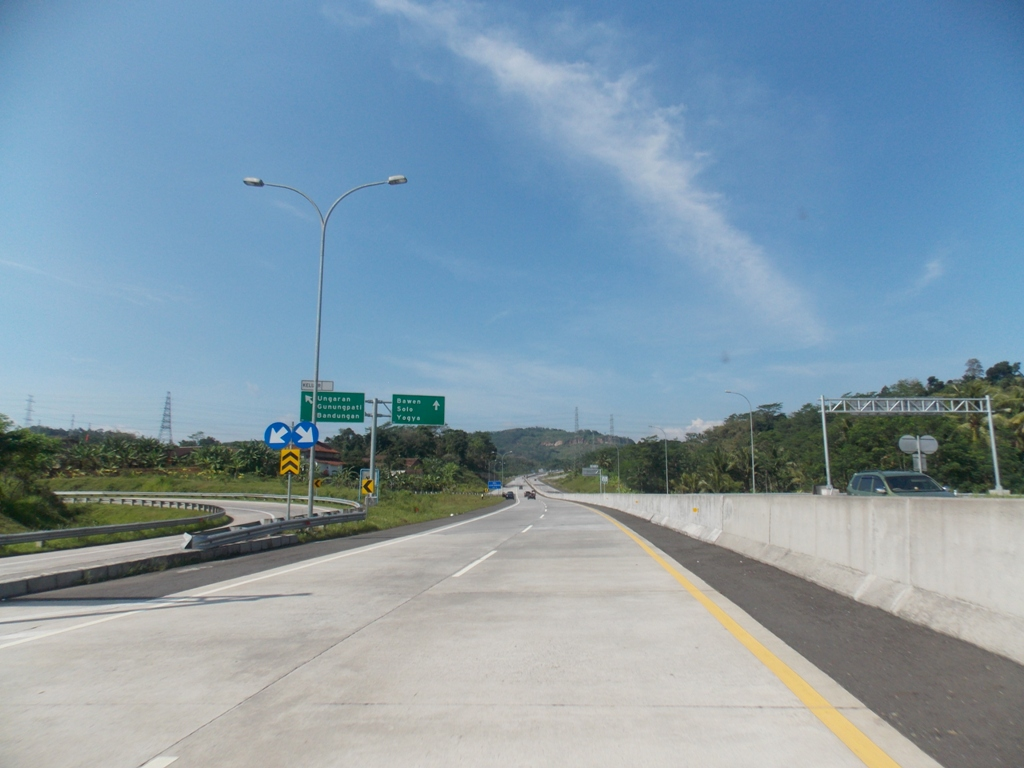
Semarang-Solo Toll Road at Ungaran Interchange

Semarang–Solo Toll Road is a controlled-access toll road that connects Semarang, capital city of Central Java and Surakarta (Solo) via Salatiga in Indonesia. This toll road is 75.7 kilometers length which is directly connected with Semarang Toll Road in Tembalang Interchange. It is operated by PT Trans Marga Jateng, a subsidiary of state-owned toll road developer and operator PT Jasa Marga (IDX:JSMR) Tbk.

== Road sections ==
This toll road is divided into 5 sections :

No	Section	Length	Status
1	Section 1 (Tembalang–Ungaran)	16.3 km	Operated
2	Section 2 (Ungaran–Bawen)	11.3 km	Operated
3	Section 3 (Bawen–Salatiga)	18.2 km	Operated
4	Section 4 (Salatiga–Boyolali)	22.4 km	Operated
5	Section 5 (Boyolali–Karanganyar)	11.1 km	Operated

== Bridges ==
This toll road has few long bridges, which cross over both the river and the valley :
Section 1 (TEMBALANG–UNGARAN)

- Banyumanik 1 (170 m)
- Banyumanik 2 (384 m)
- Gedawang (470 m)
- Susukan (470 m)
- Penggaron (400 m)

Section 2 (UNGARAN–BAWEN)

- Tinalun (335 m)
- Lemah Ireng I (879 m)
- Lemah Ireng II (300 m)

Section 3 (BAWEN-SALATIGA)

- Tuntang (330 m)
- Senjoyo (170 m)

Section 4 (SALATIGA-BOYOLALI)

- Kenteng and Serang Rivers (493 m)
- Cemoro River (200 m)
- Butak River (163 m)
- Cengger River 1 (337 m)
- Cengger River 2 (130 m)
- Pepe River (111 m)
- Bendo River (44 m)
- Kiringan River (37 m)
- Putih River 1 (122 m)
- Putih River 2 (73 m)
- Kali Putih Access Road (120 m)

Section 5 (BOYOLALI-KARTASURA)

- Grenjeng River (73 m)
- Putih River (81 m)
- Pleret River (42 m)
- Pepe River (89 m)

== Exits ==
Province	Location	km	mi	Exit	Name	Destinations	Notes
Central Java	Banyumanik, Semarang	0	0.0	419 (433)	Tembalang Interchange	Semarang Toll Road; Kota Lama Semarang; Port of Tanjung Emas; Ahmad Yani International Airport	Northern terminus
Central Java	Banyumanik, Semarang	1.67	1.04	Banyumanik Toll Gate (Main toll gate)			
Central Java	Banyumanik, Semarang	1.67	1.04	420 (434)	Banyumanik Ramp	Tembalang; Diponegoro University	Northbound exit, southbound entrance only
Central Java	East Ungaran, Semarang Regency	11.18	6.95	430 (444)	Ungaran Toll Gate	Ungaran; Gunungpati; Bandungan	
Central Java	Bawen, Semarang Regency	23.13	14.37	442 (456)	Bawen Interchange	Bawen-Yogyakarta Toll Road; Ambarawa; Magelang; Yogyakarta	
Central Java	Bawen, Semarang Regency	23.13	14.37	442 (456)	Bawen Ramp	Bawen; Bergas; Tuntang	
Central Java	Tengaran, Semarang Regency	40.43	25.12	459 (473)	Salatiga Toll Gate	Salatiga; Suruh; Tingkir	
Central Java	Mojosongo, Boyolali Regency	62.40	38.77	483 (497)	Boyolali Toll Gate	Mojosongo; Boyolali; Jatinom	
Central Java	Colomadu, Karanganyar Regency	73.68	45.78	493 (507)	Colomadu Interchange	Solo-Yogyakarta Toll Road; Kartasura; Klaten; Yogyakarta	
Central Java	Banyudono, Boyolali Regency	74.10	46.04	Solo–Kertosono Toll Road			
1.000 mi = 1.609 km; 1.000 km = 0.621 mi: Electronic toll collection; Incomplete access; Route transition; Unopened
