= Trusmi Batik Village =

Center of Batik industry in Cirebon, West Java

Coordinates: 6°42′11.1″S 108°30′20.28″E

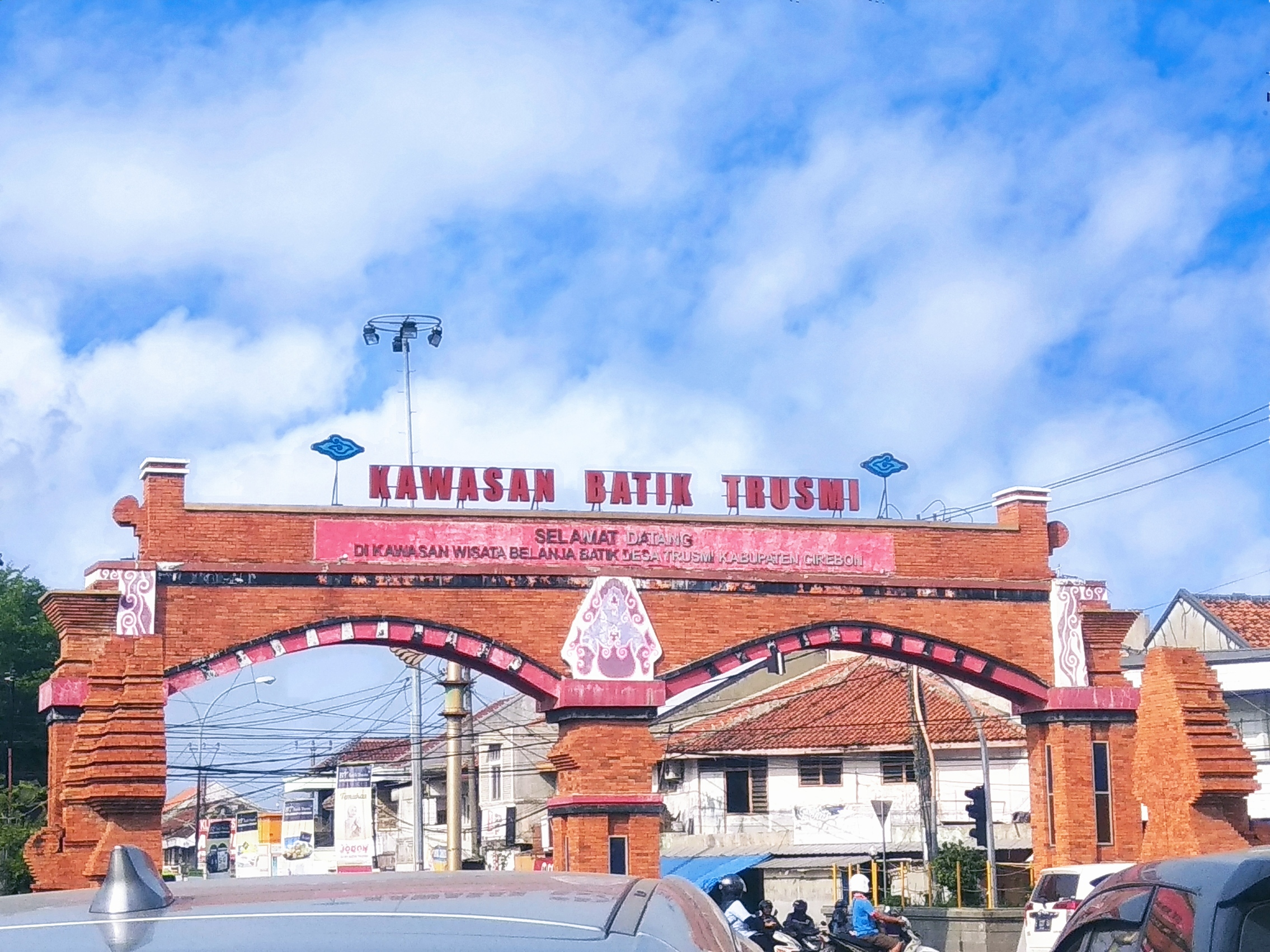
Trusmi Batik Village entrance gate

Trusmi Batik Village is a center of batik industry in Cirebon, West Java. The place is regarded as a tourist spot for batik art as well as local culinary. The village of Trusmi is located in the town of Plered, 4 km (2.5 mi) west of the city of Cirebon. There are over 1,000 batik craftsmen involved in the batik production in Trusmi, who are not only from Trusmi but also from nearby areas, such as Gamel, Kaliwulu, Wotgali, and Kalitengah. In recent years, the Trusmi village has helped boost tourism to Cirebon.

== Description ==
The batik in Cirebon is a legacy of the historical sultanates in this region, including the Kasepuhan Sultanate and the Kanoman Sultanate. Batik from Cirebon had a similar pattern of distribution with the batik of Yogyakarta or Surakarta, namely first appearing in the inner palace environment and then being spread outside by the courtiers who live outside the palace.

The batik production in Trusmi is credited to an Islamic religious leader Ki Gede Trusmi, who was loyal to the Wali Songo saint Sunan Gunung Jati. It is said that Ki Gede Trusmi preached Islam and taught people batik at the same time. Ki Gede Trusmi is still venerated today and his tomb is located in the village. Every four years, villagers conduct traditional rituals of Ganti Welit and Ganti Silap (changing the roofs of the tomb).

While batik of other regions often features one distinct style, such as the Royal Batik (Batik Keraton) of Surakarta or the Coastal Batik (Batik Pesisir) of Pekalongan, batik in Cirebon features both styles. They have unique ornaments that shape the characteristics of Cirebonese batik. Among them is Wadasan, which is often used in their Royal Batik. Wadasan batik is considered the most renowned among the batik produced in Trusmi. Their motifs include the Mega Mendung (clouds), Singa Payung (lion with umbrella), Naga Saba (dragon), and Taman Arum which is inspired by Chinese imperial designs.

Trusmi is also known for local delicacies, including empal gentong (beef soup), nasi jamblang (rice wrapped in teak leaves) and tahu gejrot (fried tofu in sweet spicy sauce).

== See also ==
- Cirebonese people
