= List of roads and highways of Java =

List of roads and highways of Java in Indonesia – this list is for the competed, under construction and project road and highway infrastructure of Java in Indonesia.

== Toll Roads ==
=== Greater Jakarta ===
- Jakarta Inner Ring Road (beltway)
- Jakarta Outer Ring Road (JORR) (beltway)
  - JORR W1 (Pantai Indah Kapuk–Kebon Jeruk Toll Road) (finished)
  - JORR W2 (Kebon Jeruk–Ulujami (Tanah Kusir) Toll Road) (finished)
  - JORR S (Ulujami (Tanah Kusir) –Taman Mini Indonesia Indah Toll Road) (finished)
  - JORR E1 (Taman Mini Indonesia Indah–Cikunir Toll Road) (finished)
  - JORR E2+E3 (Cikunir–Cakung–Cilincing Toll Road) (finished)
  - JORR N (Tanjung Priok Access Toll Road) (finished)
- Jakarta Outer Ring Road 2 (JORR 2) (beltway)
  - Cengkareng–Batu Ceper–Kunciran Toll Road (finished)
  - Kunciran–Serpong Toll Road (finished)
  - Cinere–Serpong Toll Road (finished)
  - Cinere–Jagorawi Toll Road (finished)
  - Cimanggis–Cibitung Toll Road (finished)
  - Cibitung–Cilincing Toll Road (finished)
- Prof. Dr. Ir. Soedijatmo Toll Road (Soekarno–Hatta International Airport Toll Road)
- Jakarta–Serpong Toll Road
- Serpong–Balaraja Toll Road (partially finished)
- Jakarta–Tangerang Toll Road (finished)
- Jakarta–Cikampek Toll Road (finished)
- Bogor Ring Road (partially finished)
- TMII–Bogor Toll Road (contract)

=== Outside Jakarta ===
- Surabaya/Waru–Juanda International Airport Toll Road
- Surabaya–Madura Bridge (Suramadu Bridge) (opened at 9 June 2009)
- Trans-Java Toll Road (major parts are already finished, only Probolinggo–Banyuwangi left) AH2
  - Cilegon–Bojonegara Toll Road (tender preparation)
  - Tangerang–Merak Toll Road (finished)
  - Jakarta–Tangerang Toll Road (finished)
  - Jagorawi Toll Road (finished)
  - Bogor–Ciawi–Sukabumi Toll Road (section 1 & 2 finished, section 3 & 4 under construction)
  - Sukabumi–Ciranjang Toll Road (tender preparation)
  - Ciranjang–Padalarang Toll Road (contract)
  - Jakarta–Cikampek Toll Road (finished)
  - Cikampek–Purwakarta–Padalarang Toll Road (Cipularang Toll Road) (finished)
  - Padalarang–Cileunyi Toll Road (Padaleunyi Toll Road) (finished)
  - Cileunyi-Sumedang-Dawuan Toll Road (Cisumdawu Toll Road) (finished)
  - Cikopo–Palimanan Toll Road (Cipali Toll Road) (finished)
  - Palimanan–Kanci Toll Road (Palikanci Toll Road) (finished)
  - Kanci–Pejagan Toll Road (finished)
  - Pejagan–Pemalang Toll Road (finished)
  - Pemalang–Batang Toll Road (finished)
  - Batang–Semarang Toll Road (finished)
  - Semarang Toll Road (finished)
  - Semarang–Demak Toll Road (section 1 under construction, section 2 finished)
  - Semarang–Solo Toll Road (finished)
  - Solo–Yogyakarta Toll Road (construction)
  - Solo–Mantingan–Ngawi Toll Road (finished)
  - Ngawi–Kertosono Toll Road (finished)
  - Kertosono–Mojokerto Toll Road (finished)
  - Surabaya–Mojokerto Toll Road (finished)
  - Surabaya–Gresik Toll Road (finished)
  - Surabaya–Gempol Toll Road (finished)
  - Gempol–Pandaan Toll Road (finished)
  - Pandaan-Malang Toll Road (finished)
  - Gempol–Pasuruan Toll Road (finished)
  - Pasuruan–Probolinggo Toll Road (finished)
  - Probolinggo–Banyuwangi Toll Road (section 1, 2, 3 under construction, section 4, 5, 6, 7 preparation)
- Jakarta–Surabaya Toll road (parts of Trans-Java Toll road) (finished)
- Yogyakarta Outer Ring Road

=== Planned ===
- Sunda Strait Bridge AH25
- Serang–Panimbang Toll Road (section 2 & 3 under construction)
- Jakarta Harbor Road 2 (Tanjung Priok–Ancol Timur–Pluit) Toll Road (under construction)
- Jakarta Inner Ring Road 2 (JIRR 2) (beltway)
  - Semanan–Grogol–Sunter Toll Road (phase 1)
  - Sunter–Kelapa Gading–Pulogebang Toll Road (phase 1)
  - Duri Pulo–Kampung Melayu Toll Road (phase 2)
  - Kampung Melayu–Kemayoran Toll Road (phase 2)
  - Ulujami–Tanah Abang Toll Road (phase 3)
  - Pasar Minggu–Casablanca Toll Road (phase 4)
- Jakarta/Antasari–Depok Toll Road (section 3 & 4 under construction)
- Bekasi–Cawang–Kampung Melayu Toll Road (Becakayu Toll Road), (section 2B under construction)
- Jakarta Outer Ring Road 3 (JORR 3) (beltway)
  - Kamal–Teluk Naga–Rajeg Toll Road
  - Semanan–Balaraja Toll Road
  - Serpong–Balaraja Toll Road (section 2 & 3 under construction)
  - Serpong–Bitung–Batu Ceper Toll Road
  - Bogor–Serpong (via Parung) Toll Road
  - BORR (Bogor Outer Ring Road) Toll Road (section 3B under construction)
  - Sentul–Karawang Barat Toll Road
  - Karawang Barat–Babelan Toll Road
  - Babelan–Pulogebang Toll Road
- Salabenda Junction Toll Road
- Jakarta–Cikampek 2 South (JAPEK 2 Selatan) Toll Road (under construction)
- Bogor–Ciawi–Sukabumi (section 3 & 4 under construction)
- Sukabumi–Ciranjang Toll Road (awaits for Bocimi to be fully finished)
- Ciranjang–Padalarang Toll Road (awaits for Bocimi to be fully finished)
- BIUTR (Bandung Intra Urban Toll Road) (tender preparation)
- BAndung Outer Ring Road (BAORR) (beltway)
  - Bandung South Ring Road Toll Road (tender preparation)
  - Bandung North Ring Road Toll Road (planned)
- Gedebage–Tasikmalaya–Cilacap Toll Road (tender preparation)
- Cilacap–Yogyakarta Toll Road (awaits for Getaci & Yoglo to be finished)
- Semarang–Demak Toll Road (section 1 under construction, section 2 finished)
- Semarang Harbour Road (Semarang–Kendal) Toll Road (planned)
- Solo–Yogyakarta Toll Road (under construction)
- Probolinggo–Banyuwangi Toll Road (section 1, 2, 3 under construction, section 4, 5, 6, 7 preparation)

== See also ==
- Transport in Indonesia
