= Indonesian Livestock Research Center =

Research institute in Indonesia

Coordinates: 6.668455300000001°S 106.8579759°E

Indonesian Livestock Research Center (Indonesian: Balai Penelitian Ternak) is a research center whose tasks involve the research of poultry, cattle, buffaloes, goats, sheep, etc. It is located in Banjarwaru Street, Ciawi, Bogor Regency, West Java.

== Research ==
Research papers published by this center include:

- Characterization of microsatelite sequences in ducks.
- Analysis of the nutrition value of Aspergillus niger fermentation in palm kernels.
- Synergistic enzyme activity from Eupenicillium javanicum dan Aspergillus niger NRRL 337 fermentation in palm kernel oil.
