= List of main infrastructure projects in Indonesia =

This list of main infrastructure projects in Indonesia includes recently completed projects, activities reported being under way, and main projects which have been announced as likely to start in the near future.

== Currently underway ==
=== Jakarta-Bandung high-speed rail ===
Estimated cost: around $US 5.6 billion

The Jakarta-Bandung high-speed rail is the first high-speed railway project in South East Asia. The railway connects Jakarta, the country's capital and largest city, with Bandung, the capital of West Java, with a total length of nearly 142.3 kilometres. PT. Kereta Cepat Indonesia China (KCIC), a joint venture between China and Indonesia, will be operating the railway. At the same time, the Chinese partner planned to deliver the Fuxing electric multiple unit (EMU KCIC400AF) and inspection trainset (KCIC400AF CIT 22 01 Inspection trainset) to Indonesia in September 2022, and deliver them at the G20 Bali summit in November 2022 during the test run.

- March 2012: It was reported that the Indonesian Government had agreed to funded a feasibility study into the possibility of constructing a super-express train to travel between Jakarta and Bandung (144 km) in as little as 30 minutes. At that time, the trip normally took around three hours. The feasibility study was expected to take perhaps two years to prepare. The completion date of the project was ambitiously mentioned as being perhaps 2017 or 2018.
- August 2015: During 2015, there was extensive discussion in the Indonesian media about vying bids between Japan and China to support the construction of the project. It was suggested that senior officials in the Indonesian Government were leaning towards favouring the Chinese project. President Jokowi later announced that the Chinese proposal was preferred.
- January 2016: It was announced that the government's plan to begin the construction of the high-speed train would kick off later in the month. The plan was for the construction to begin later in 2016 and be finished by 2018.
- August 2016: The Minister for State-Owned Enterprises, Rini Soemarno, said that the process of issuing permits for the project was running smoothly after earlier delays. She said that she believed that construction on the railway could start within a week.
- September 2020: Director of KCIC Xin Xuezhong stated that construction progress had reached 60 percent and land acquisitions had reached 100 percent.
- November 2022: During the G20 Summit in Bali, Indonesian President Joko Widodo and General Secretary of the Chinese Communist Party Xi Jinping remotely attended the trial run of the CIT400AF inspection train, which started a series of its maiden powered test runs on HSR tracks to the west of Tegalluar station.
- March 2023: Construction has been completed.

=== Trans-Java toll road ===
Estimated cost: Rp 51.6 trillion (around $US 5.5 billion) for 619.4 km.

The idea of a trans-Java toll road stretching from the ports of Banyuwangi in the province of East Java to Merak in Banten province in the west of Java has been under discussion in Indonesia for many years. There were plans to get the project underway during the 1990s but work was put on hold following the impact of the 1997-98 Asian Financial Crisis in Indonesia. The length of the major highway road is mentioned, variously, at between 800 km to over 1,100 km depending on precisely which subsections of the overall activity are said to be included. There are usually at least 20 subsections listed as part of the overall project. The status of the subsections currently (early 2013) ranges from operational to still in the planning stage. Land acquisition is often a major problem. There are frequent reports in the national press of land acquisition programs for various sub-projects within the overall scheme. The cost of constructing the major part of the toll road (619 km) is listed in the Indonesian government's Masterplan 2011-2015 (MP3EI, p. 199) as Rp 51.6 trillion (around $US 5.5 billion).

- Sept 2012: Ministry of Public Works officials were reported in the national press as saying that land acquisition and associated financial problems were holding up various sub-projects within the total toll road. It was reported that of a planned 615 km under construction, land acquisition had been arranged for 53% of the total. In principle, the remaining time for project completion was two years but in some cases, the process of land acquisition was completely stalled.
- Mar 2013: The Public Works Minister, Djoko Kirmanto, said that construction of the nine main segments of the road would certainly not be finished by the end of 2014. He said that there were still various delays in implementing the project. Of the total length of 650 km planned for the road segments currently included in the overall project, only 62.3 km had so far been built.

=== Trans-Sumatra toll road ===
Estimated cost: Rp 351 trillion (around $US 36 billion)

The plan is to construct a trans-Sumatra toll road from Banda Aceh at the northern tip of Sumatra to the province of Lampung in the south, a distance of perhaps around 2,000 km or more (depending on the route chosen). The plan is to begin the large project with the construction of a 22-km stretch from Palembang to Indralaya in the province of South Sumatra beginning in March 2013. The state-owned construction firm PT Hutama Karya has been appointed by the Ministry of State-Owned Enterprises to begin work on the overall project of constructing the overall toll road.

- March 2013: It was announced that construction was expected to start during 2013. State-owned construction firm PT Hutama Karya was waiting for the government to issue an official regulation of appointment to carry out the project. Expected date of completion was said to be 2015.
- End 2013: Progress was reported to be slow. Officials were still waiting for the president to sign a Presidential Regulation (Keppres or Keputusan President) to speed up processes for the construction of the project. Land acquisition, especially, had been very slow.
- Early 2018: New toll roads have been opened in Lampung, South Sumatra, and North Sumatra provinces. Ongoing constructions are also taking place in Riau and West Sumatra provinces. Land acquisition is being performed in Aceh for its first toll road project.

=== Jakarta MRT (Mass Rapid Transit) ===
Estimated cost: varies from Rp 15.5 trillion (around US$1.7 billion) to Rp 23 trillion (around US$2.3 billion)

The Jakarta Mass Rapid Transit Project mainly consists of the planned construction of a series (three phases) of MRT rail links across Jakarta.

First phase will be a 15.5 kilometer North-South corridor with 13 stations. The plan is to construct a central MRT station with a line running from Lebak Bulus (South Jakarta) to the Hotel Indonesia traffic circle (Central Jakarta). Initial plans are for six underground stations and seven above-ground stations. Groundbreaking is expected to take place during 2013. The project was originally said to be targeted for completion in late 2016 although more recently a target date of 2018 has been mentioned. The project has support from the Japanese government and major Japanese construction firms have been showing interest in bidding for sections of the activity. Funding will be initially provided from a Yen 120 billion ($US 1.4 billion) soft loan from JICA.

Second phase, it is expected that the line will be extended northwards (with an estimated length of around 8 km through Harmoni and Kota to Kampung Bandan in North Jakarta)

Third phase is the east-west line that will connect Tangerang to Bekasi and will connect to second phase in Kebon Sirih station, Central Jakarta.

- April 2012: One of the main firms involved in the project, PT Mass Rapid Transit Jakarta, announced the letting of contracts for the procurement of rolling stock (96 cars).
- Late 2012: After he took office in October, the new governor of Jakarta Joko Widodo put the MRT project on hold. The governor called for a review of the project. He argued that the project was over-priced and that if it went ahead, the Indonesian central government needed to provide additional financial support. The governor also said that he wanted the two main consortiums bidding for the project—one mainly consisting of private sector firms and the other mainly made up of state-owned firms—to join together into a single consortium. However, previous attempts to arrange this sort of cooperation on the project had not been successful and some of the main firms indicated that they were not willing to adopt the governor's suggestion.
- December 2012: Jakarta Mayor Joko Widodo announced that after a review, the project would go ahead. He listed it as one of the priority projects in the Jakarta city budget for 2013.
- May 2013: Jakarta Mayor Joko Widodo officially launched further arrangements to build the MRT. It was announced that tenders for the first three out of a total of eight work packages had been awarded. A consortium consisting of Shimizu-Obayashi-Wijaya Karya-Java Konstruksi had won tenders to build two underground stations. A consortium consisting of Sumitomo Mitsui Construction Company-Hutama Karya had won the third tender.

=== Jakarta LRT and Greater Jakarta LRT ===
Estimated cost: Rp 23.8 trillion rupiah (around US$1.8 billion).

The Jakarta light rail transit system will connect Jakarta city centre with suburbans in Greater Jakarta such as Bekasi and Bogor.

First phase of Light rail transit (LRT) is planned to include three lines: Cibubur–Cawang–Dukuh Atas: 24.2 km (Phase 1A), and Bekasi Timur–Cawang: 17.9 km (Phase 1B). Construction Phase I began on September 9, 2015 and will be finished by 2021.

Second phase will extent the first phase lines: Cibubur-Bogor Baranangsiang, Dukuh Atas-Palmerah-Senayan, and Palmerah-Grogol. The construction phase of extension for the planned route from Grogol–Pesing–Rawa Buaya–Kamal Raya–Dadap–Soekarno–Hatta International Airport is proposed, but was not mentioned in Peraturan Presiden Republik Indonesia Nomor 98 Tahun 2015.

- September 2015: A groundbreaking ceremony was held on September 9, 2015, with the first phase of the construction will connect Harjamukti in Depok with Dukuh Atas BNI in downtown Central Jakarta, passing through Cawang intersection. This phase will be 42.1 kilometers long, which include 18 stations, and expected to be opened to the public by the first half of 2018, prior of 2018 Asian Games.

== Proposed ==
=== Trans-Sumatra railway ===
Estimated cost (2022): US$7.4billion (Rp 65 trillion)

It was announced (November 2014) that the Transportation Ministry was preparing plans for a 2,168 km rail link from Aceh in the northern tip of Sumatra to Lampung at the southern tip. A feasibility study was expected to be prepared during 2015. In the first stages, selected segments of the proposed Sumatran rail link (such as a link between Pekanbaru and Dumai in the province of Riau) would be given priority.

=== Trans-Sulawesi railway ===
The first phase includes 146 kilometers route from Makassar to Pare-pare.

The Trans-Sulawesi Railway are built with 1,435 mm (4 ft 8+1/2 in) standard gauge which is wider than the 1,067 mm (3 ft 6 in) cape gauge used in Java and Sumatra to accommodate more weight and speed.

== Postponed temporary ==
=== Sunda Strait Bridge ===
Estimated cost: perhaps between $15–20 billion

The Sunda Strait Bridge project is an ambitious plan for a road and railway megaproject between the two Indonesian islands of Sumatra and Java. In October 2007, after years of discussion and planning, the Indonesian government gave the initial go-ahead for a project which included several of the world’s longest suspension bridges, across the 27 km (17 mi) Sunda Strait. The project remained at the feasibility stage during the period of the administration of president Susilo Bambang Yudhoyono, although senior government figures, including the president, repeatedly said that the project would begin before the end of his administration in 2014. A number of ministerial meetings were held in 2010–2014 to discuss steps needed to support the project. However, in November 2014, the incoming Joko Widodo government announced that plans to build the bridge would be shelved.

== See also ==
- Energy in Indonesia
- List of airports in Indonesia
- List of the busiest airports in Indonesia
- List of ports in Indonesia
- List of power stations in Indonesia
- List of railway stations in Indonesia
- List of roads and highways of Java
- List of toll roads in Indonesia
- Rail transport in Indonesia
- Transport in Indonesia
