= Pemalang–Batang Toll Road =

Toll Road in Indonesia

- Jalan Tol Pemalang–Batang
- Pematang Toll Road
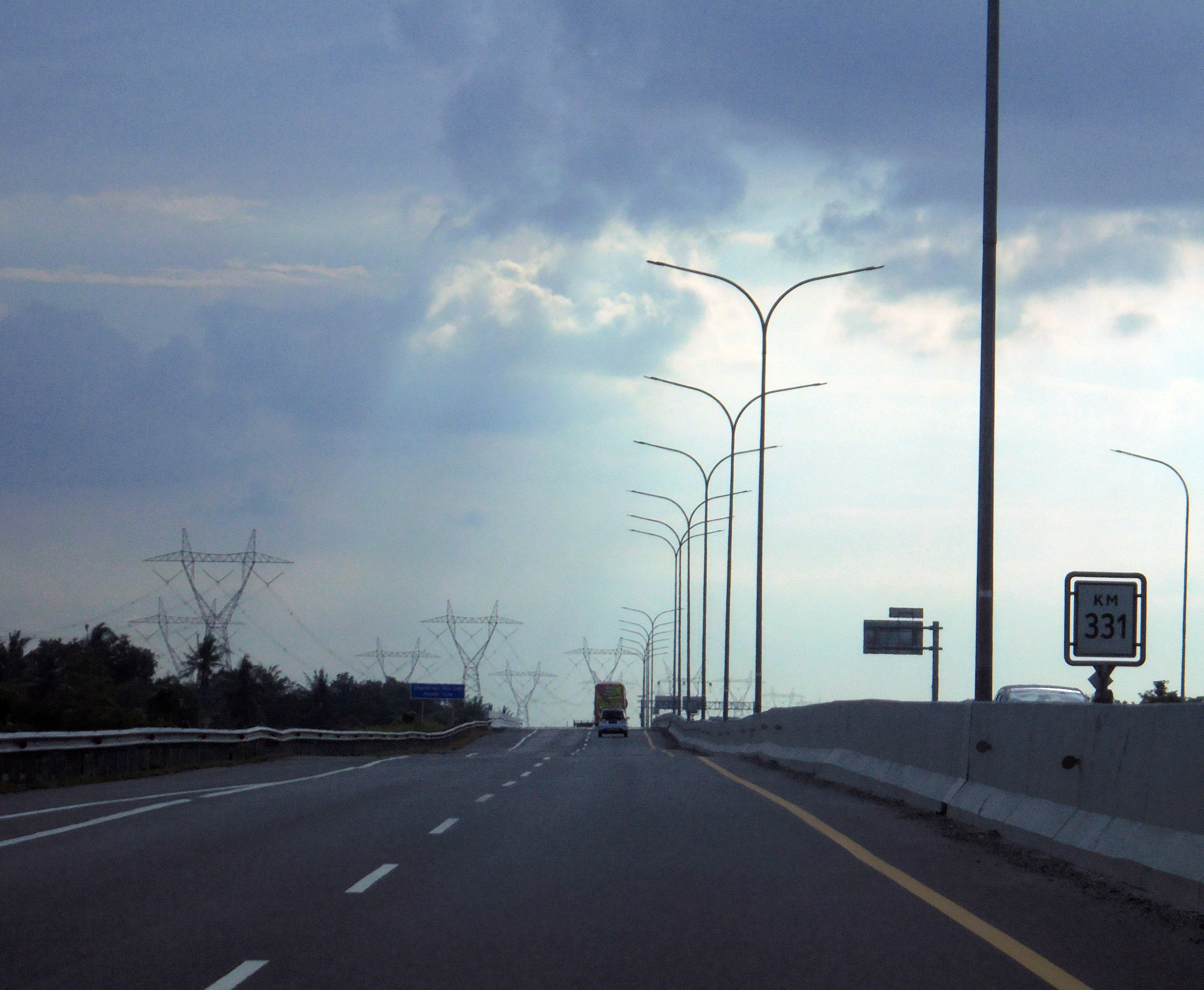
- Pemalang-Batang Toll Road heading westbound in 2023

Route information
- Part of AH2
- Maintained by PT Pemalang Batang Tol Road
- Length: 39 km (24 mi)
- Existed: 2018–present

Major junctions
- West end: Pemalang
- AH2 – Pejagan–Pemalang toll road; AH2 – Batang–Semarang Toll Road
- East end: Batang

Location
- Country: Indonesia
- Major cities: Pemalang Regency; Pekalongan Regency; Pekalongan; Batang Regency

Highway system
- Transport in Indonesia

Pemalang–Batang Toll Road or abbreviated to Pematang Toll Road, is a 39.2 kilometer controlled-access toll road that connects Pemalang area with Batang, Central Java, Indonesia. This toll road is part of Trans-Java Toll Road which will connect Merak to Banyuwangi of the island of Java. The toll road is fully opened on November 9, 2018, by 7th President of Indonesia Joko Widodo.

== Sections ==
This toll road has two sections:

- Section I: (Pemalang - Pekalongan), length 20,05
- Section II: (Pekalongan - Batang), length 16,7 km.

== Toll gates ==
Note: The number on the exits is based on the distance from the western terminus of the Jakarta-Cikampek Toll Road, while the distance numbers are based on the distance from the western terminus of this toll road only

Province	Location	km	mi	Exit	Name	Destinations	Notes
Central Java	Taman, Pemalang Regency	0	0.0	312	Pemalang Toll Gate	Pemalang; Comal; Pejagan–Pemalang Toll Road	Western terminus
Central Java	Bojong, Pekalongan Regency	19.14	11.89	331	Bojong Toll Gate	Pekalongan; Kajen	
Central Java	Warungasem, Batang Regency	29.74	18.48	341	Batang Toll Gate	Batang; Pekalongan	
Central Java	Kandeman, Batang Regency	36.48	22.67	348	Kandeman Toll Gate	Batang; Subah; Kandeman	Eastern terminus
Central Java	Kandeman, Batang Regency	36.60	22.74	Batang–Semarang Toll Road			
1.000 mi = 1.609 km; 1.000 km = 0.621 mi: Route transition
