= Batang–Semarang Toll Road =

Toll Road in Indonesia

Batang–Semarang Toll Road
- Jalan Tol Batang–Semarang
- Semartang/Batarang Toll Road
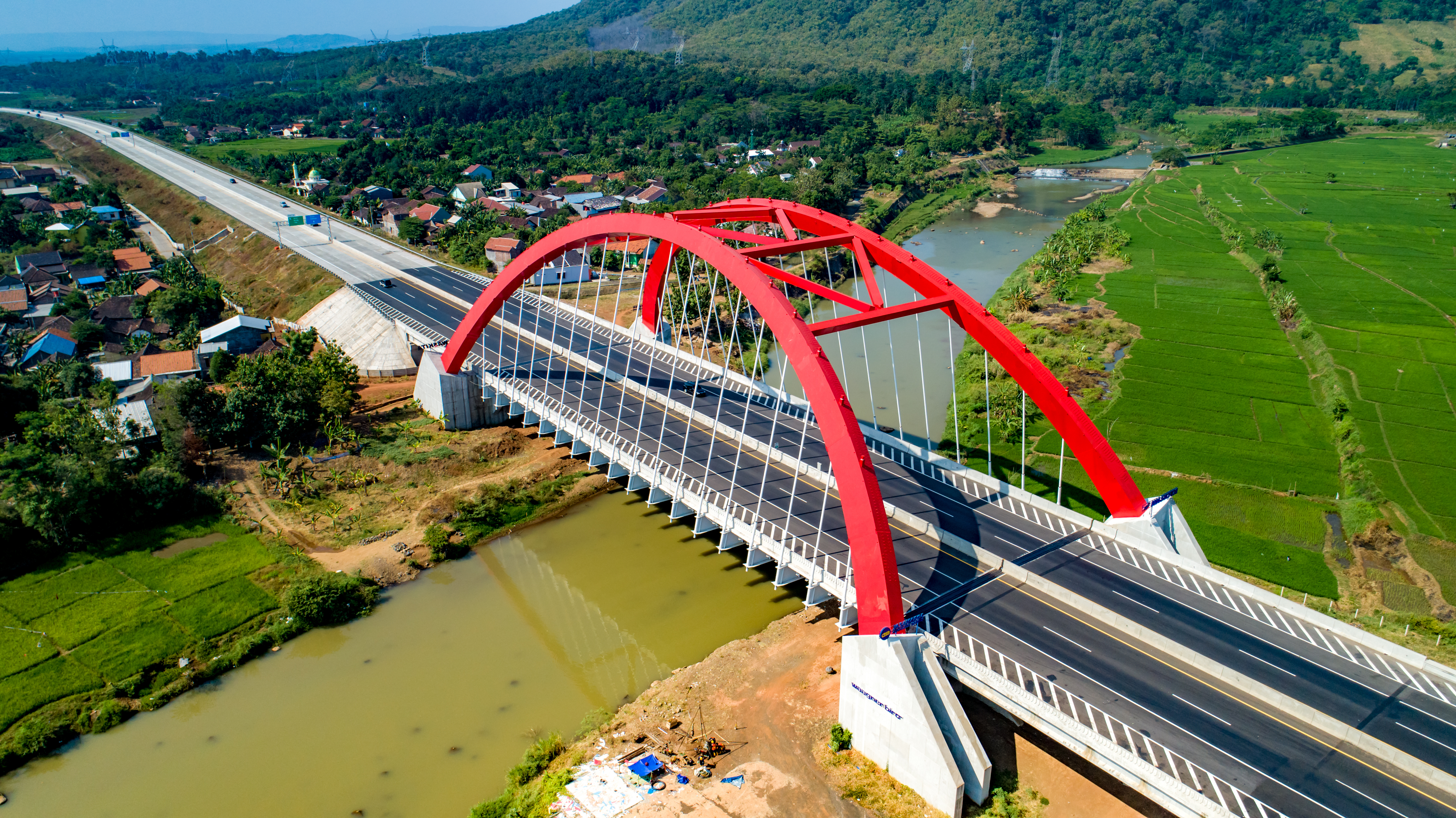
- Kalikuto Bridge on Batang–Semarang Toll Road

Route information
- Part of AH2
- Maintained by PT Jasamarga Semarang Batang (PT Jasa Marga Tbk and PT Waskita Toll Road (Waskita Karya))
- Length: 75 km (47 mi)
- Existed: 2018–present

Major junctions
- West end: Batang
- AH2 – Pemalang–Batang Toll Road; Semarang Toll Road
- East end: Semarang

Location
- Country: Indonesia
- Major cities: Batang Regency; Kendal Regency; Semarang

Highway system
- Transport in Indonesia

Batang-Semarang Toll Road is a 75 kilometers long controlled-access toll road that connects Batang area with Semarang, Central Java, Indonesia. This toll road is part of Trans-Java Toll Road which will connect Merak to Banyuwangi of the island of Java. The toll road is operational since 2018.

== Sections ==
Until November 2017, its construction progress is at 55.7 percent. The construction of this toll road is divided into 5 sections:

- Section I, beginning of project - East Batang (3.2 km)
- Section II, East Batang - Weleri (36.35 km)
- Section III, Weleri - Kendal (11.05 km)
- Section IV, Kendal - Kaliwungu (13.5 km)
- Section V, Kaliwungu - Krapyak (10.9 km)

== Exits and Gates ==
Note: The number on the exits is based on the distance from the western terminus of the Jakarta-Cikampek Toll Road, while the distance numbers are based on the distance from the western terminus of this toll road only

Province	Location	km	mi	Exit	Name	Destinations	Notes
Central Java	Kandeman, Batang Regency	0	0.0	348	Kandeman Toll Gate	Batang; Subah; Kandeman; Pemalang–Batang Toll Road	Western terminus
Central Java	Gringsing, Batang Regency	23.96	14.89	371	Gringsing Toll Gate	Gringsing; Industrial Area	
Central Java	Weleri, Kendal Regency	36.10	22.43	384	Weleri Toll Gate	Weleri; Batang	
Central Java	Pegandon, Kendal Regency	47.04	29.23	395	Kendal Toll Gate	Kendal; Pegandon; Patebon	
Central Java	Kaliwungu, Kendal Regency	60.40	37.53	409	Kaliwungu Toll Gate	Kaliwungu; Boja	
Central Java	Ngaliyan, Semarang	64.88	40.31	Kalikangkung Toll Gate (Main toll gate)			
Central Java	Ngaliyan, Semarang	71.30	44.30	419	Krapyak Interchange	Northbound; Krapyak; Ahmad Yani International Airport; Southbound; Semarang Toll Road; Demak; Solo; Surabaya	Eastern terminus, Eastern end of Toll Road Route 1, Western end of Toll Road Route 6
1.000 mi = 1.609 km; 1.000 km = 0.621 mi: Electronic toll collection; Route transition
