= Semarang–Demak Toll Road =

Toll road in Indonesia

Semarang–Demak Toll Road
- Semarak Toll Road
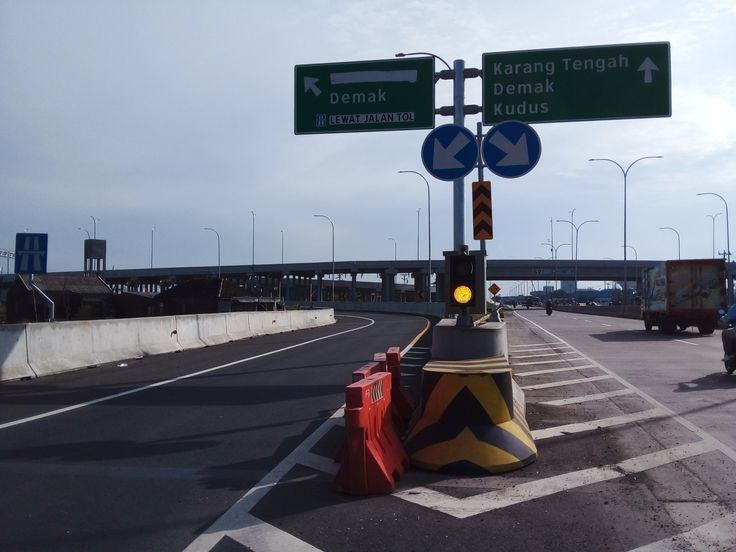
- The entrance to the Semarang–Demak Toll Road in 2023

Route information
- Part of AH2
- Maintained by PT PP and PT Wijaya Karya
- Length: 24.74 km (15.37 mi)
- Existed: 2022–present

Major junctions
- West end: Semarang
- Semarang Toll Road
- East end: Demak

Location
- Country: Indonesia
- Provinces: Central Java
- Major cities: Semarang; Demak Regency

Highway system
- Transport in Indonesia

Semarang–Demak Toll Road (Semarak) is an under-construction controlled-access toll road that will connect Semarang with Demak in Java, Indonesia. The 24.7-kilometre (15.3 mi) toll road will act as a complement to the Trans-Java Toll Road. The toll road will increase accessibility and road network in the northern parts of Java. The toll road will be integrated with a sea dike at the northern beach of Semarang City, all the way until the Sayung River in Demak Regency.

The goal of constructing this toll road is to minimize congestion along the Semarang–Demak-Surabaya northern coast road of Java and also to the tourist cities in Demak, namely; Kadilangu/Sunan Kalijaga Tomb and Demak Great Mosque, as well as to overcome tidal flooding along the northern coast as a retaining sea wall guarder. The toll road is expected to be completed by 2021.

== Sections ==
The toll road is divided into two sections, namely Section I of Semarang City and Section II of Demak Regency.

- Section I Semarang City: District Genuk: Ex. Terboyo Wetan, Terboyo Kulon & Tirtomulyo
- Section II Regency of Demak: District Sayung: Sriwulan Village, Bedono, Purwosari, Sidogemah, Sayung. Loireng & Tambakroto. District Karangtengah: Batu Village, Wonokerto, Kedunguter, Dukun, Karangsari, Pulosari & Grogol. District Wonosalam: Karangrejo Village, Wonosalam & Kendal Doyong. District Demak City: Ex. Kadilangu.

== Exits ==
Province	Location	km	mi	Exit	Name	Destinations	Notes
Central Java	Semarang			Semarang Toll Road			
Central Java	Semarang				Terboyo Ramp	Tanjung Emas; Terboyo; Genuk	
Central Java	Demak	0	0.0	449	Sayung Toll Gate	Sayung; Mranggen; Karangtengah	
Central Java	Demak	15.8	9.8	464	Demak Toll Gate	Demak; Kudus; Pati	
1.000 mi = 1.609 km; 1.000 km = 0.621 mi: Concurrency terminus; Electronic toll collection; Incomplete access; Route transition; Unopened
