= Semarang Toll Road =

Toll Road in Indonesia

Semarang Section ABC Toll Road
- Jalan Tol Semarang Seksi ABC
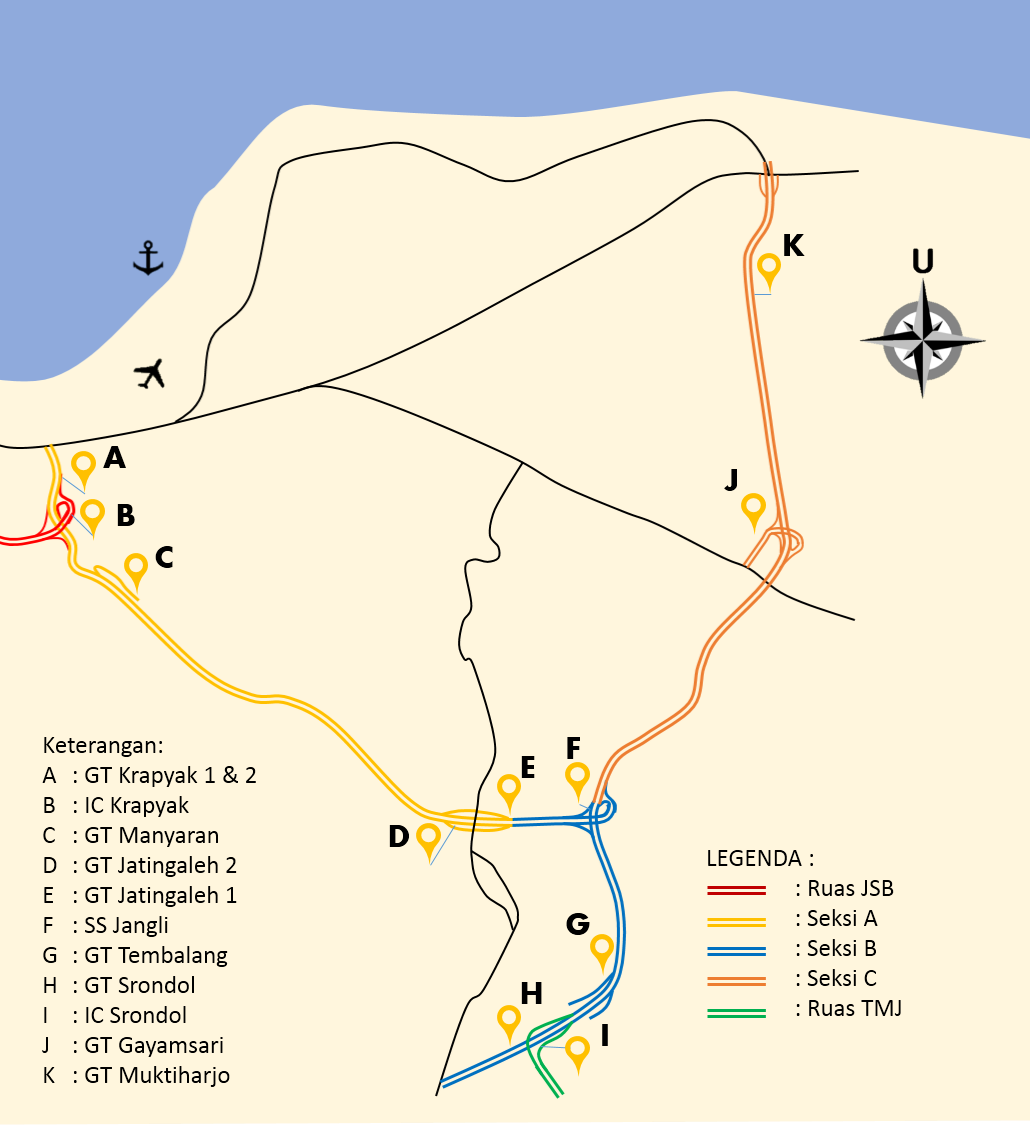
- Layout of Semarang Toll Road

Route information
- Maintained by PT Jasa Marga Tbk
- Existed: 1983–present

Major junctions
- Beltway around Semarang
- AH2 – Batang–Semarang Toll Road; Semarang–Demak Toll Road; AH2 – Semarang–Solo Toll Road

Location
- Country: Indonesia
- Major cities: Semarang

Highway system
- Transport in Indonesia

The Semarang Section ABC Toll Road (Indonesian: Jalan Tol Semarang Seksi ABC) is a controlled-access toll road that connects around areas of Semarang, capital city of Central Java, in Indonesia. This toll road is 24.75 kilometres (15.38 mi) long, and is directly connected with Semarang–Solo Toll Road at Tembalang Interchange and National Highway Route 1 at Krapyak junction and Kaligawe junction.

== Road Section ==
This toll road has been divided into 3 sections :

No	Section	Toll Plaza	Junction/Interchange
1	Section A, Krapyak Junction to Jangli Interchange	Manyaran Toll Plaza	Krapyak Junction; Jalan Siliwangi; Cirebon, Bandung, Jakarta; Ahmad Yani Airport, City Center; Krapyak-Pluit Toll Road Jatingaleh Ramp; Jalan Teuku Umar; City Center, Jatidiri Sport Complex
2	Section B, Srondol Junction to Jangli Interchange	Tembalang Toll Plaza	Srondol Junction; Jalan Setiabudi; Ungaran, Solo/Yogya Tembalang Ramp; Tembalang, Diponegoro University Tembalang Interchange; Semarang–Solo Toll Road; Tembalang–Juanda Airport Toll Road; Ungaran/Bawen; Surakarta, Yogyakarta
3	Section C, Kaligawe Ramp to Jangli Interchange	Muktiharjo Toll Plaza Gayamsari Toll Plaza	Kaligawe Ramp; Tanjung Emas Port; Demak, Surabaya; Kaligawe-Manyar Toll Road (planned) Gayamsari Interchange; City Center; Purwodadi, Blora

Section A has been connected straightly to Jakarta-Cikampek Toll Road since December 21, 2018. Section B also has been connected to Surabaya–Gempol Toll Road (turn left & right) & Waru-Juanda Toll Road (straightly), also since December 21, 2018. And the section C futurely will be connected to Surabaya-Gresik Toll Road.

== Exits ==
Note: The number on the exits is based on the distance from the western terminus of the Jakarta-Cikampek Toll Road, while the distance numbers are based on the distance from the western terminus of this toll road only

=== Section A (Krapyak-Jatingaleh) ===
Province	Location	km	mi	Exit	Name	Destinations	Notes
Central Java	Ngaliyan/West Semarang, Semarang	0.3	0.19	421A	Krapyak Ramp	Krapyak; Mangkang; Ahmad Yani International Airport	
Central Java	Ngaliyan/West Semarang, Semarang	0	0.0	419	Krapyak Interchange	Batang–Semarang Toll Road; Batang; Pemalang; Jakarta	
Central Java	West Semarang, Semarang	0.8	0.50	Krapyak Toll Gate (Northbound tolls only)			
Central Java	West Semarang, Semarang	2.45	1.52	421	Manyaran Toll Gate		Southbound entrance only
Central Java	Gajahmungkur, Semarang	7.83	4.87	427	Jatingaleh Toll Gate	Jatingaleh; Simpang Lima; Jatidiri Stadium	
Central Java	Candisari, Semarang	10.11	6.28	429	Jangli Interchange	Northbound (Section C); Port of Tanjung Emas; Demak; Purwodadi; Southbound (Section B); Tembalang; Srondol; Semarang–Solo Toll Road	
1.000 mi = 1.609 km; 1.000 km = 0.621 mi: Electronic toll collection; Incomplete access; Route transition

=== Section B (Srondol-Jatingaleh) ===
Province	Location	km	mi	Exit	Name	Destinations	Notes
Central Java	Banyumanik, Semarang	0	0.0	429	Jangli Interchange	Westbound (Section A); Jatingaleh; Batang–Semarang Toll Road; Krapyak	
Central Java	Tembalang, Semarang	2.77	1.72	432	Tembalang Ramp	Tembalang; Diponegoro University	Southbound exit and northbound entrance only
Central Java	Banyumanik, Semarang	3.53	2.19	433	Tembalang Interchange	Semarang–Solo Toll Road; Ungaran; Solo	Southbound exit and Northbound entry only
Central Java	Banyumanik, Semarang	3.72	2.31	Srondol Toll Gate			
Central Java	Banyumanik, Semarang	4.84	3.01	434	Srondol Ramp	Srondol; Banyumanik	
1.000 mi = 1.609 km; 1.000 km = 0.621 mi: Electronic toll collection; Incomplete access; Route transition

=== Section C (Jatingaleh-Kaligawe) ===
Province	Location	km	mi	Exit	Name	Destinations	Notes
Central Java	Banyumanik, Semarang	0	0.0	429	Jangli Interchange	Westbound (Section A); Jatingaleh; Batang–Semarang Toll Road; Krapyak	
Central Java	Gayamsari, Semarang	4.41	2.74	434	Gayamsari Interchange	Gayamsari; Simpang Lima; Purwodadi	
Central Java	Gayamsari, Semarang	7.30	4.54	Muktiharjo Toll Gate (Southbound toll only)			
Central Java	Genuk, Semarang	9.10	5.65	439	Kaligawe Ramp	Northbound; Semarang Ring Road; Port of Tanjung Emas; Ahmad Yani International Airport; Westbound; Tawang Station; Kota Lama Semarang; Eastbound; Kaligawe; Terboyo; Demak; Semarang-Demak Toll Road; Tuban; Gresik	Eastern terminus
Central Java	1.000 mi = 1.609 km; 1.000 km = 0.621 mi: Electronic toll collection; Route transition						
