= George Junus Aditjondro =

Indonesian sociologist

George Junus Aditjondro (27 May 1946–10 December 2016) was an Indonesian sociologist.

== Life and career ==
Aditjondro was born in Pekalongan, Central Java and began his career as a journalist for Tempo Magazine. From 1994 to 1995, he became widely known as a critic of President Suharto's government over corruption and East Timor. He left Indonesia for Australia for seven years and was banned by Soeharto's regime in March 1998. He became a sociology lecturer at the University of Newcastle. Previously, he taught at the Satya Wacana Christian University in Indonesia.

On his return from Australia, he wrote several controversial books. In December 2009, during the launch of his book Dismantling Cikeas Octopus, Aditjondro was accused of assault against Ramadhan Pohan, a member of parliament from the Democratic Party. Ex-president of Indonesia Susilo Bambang Yudhoyono expressed his concerns regarding the contents of the book. Soon, the book was taken off the shelves across the nation.

== Death ==
Aditjondro died of stroke at the age of 70 in Palu, Central Sulawesi in 2016.
