= Ciawi, Bogor =

Ciawi
- Town and District
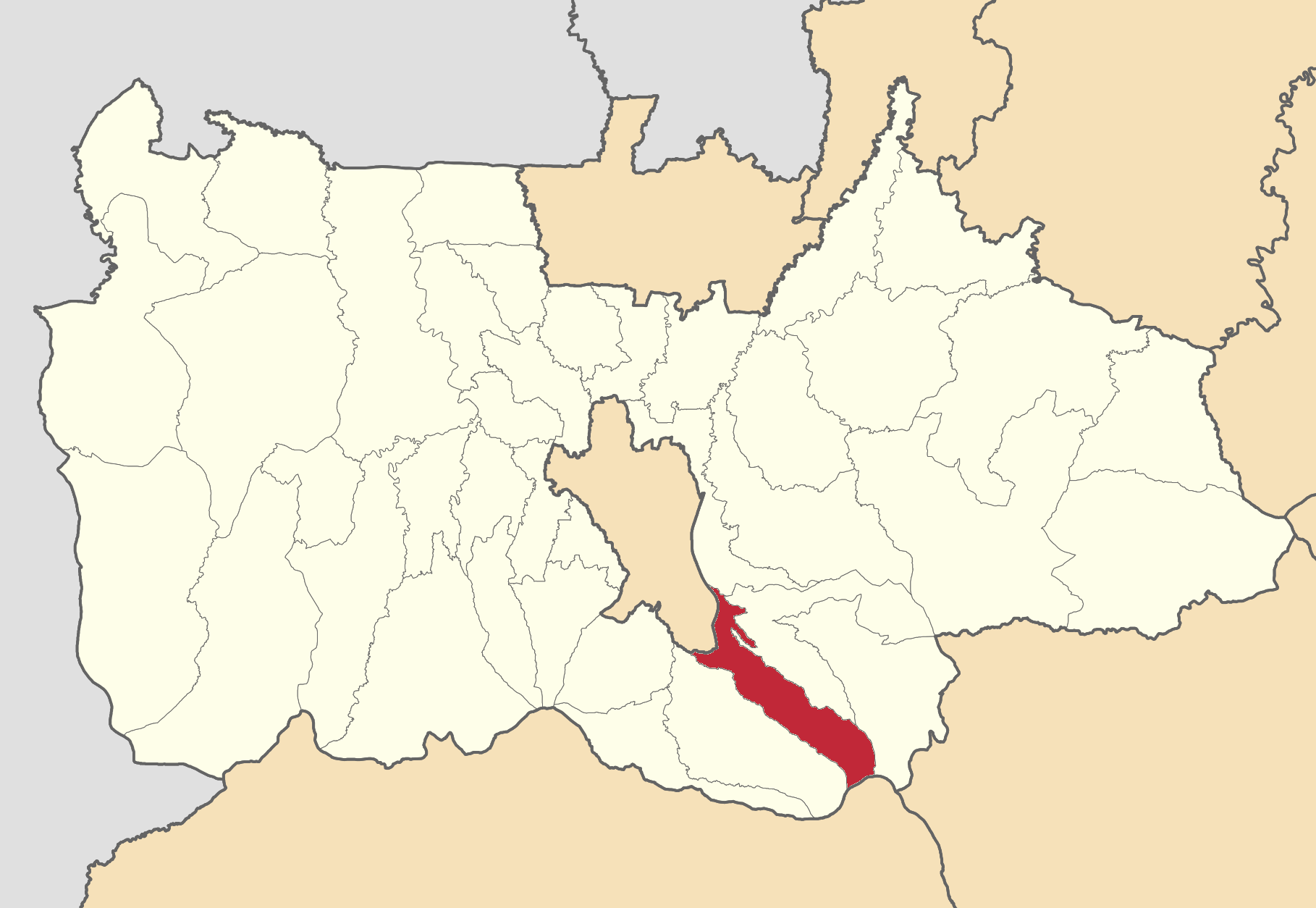
- Ciawi in Bogor Regency
- Coordinates: 6°39′44″S 106°51′12″E
- Country: Indonesia
- Province: West Java
- Regency: Bogor Regency

Area
  - Total: 25.53 km^{2} (9.86 sq mi)
- Elevation: 494 m (1,621 ft)

Population
  - Estimate (mid 2024 estimate): 122,271

Ciawi is a town and an administrative district (Indonesian: kecamatan) in the Bogor Regency, West Java, Indonesia - not to be confused with the similarly named Ciawi District in Tasikmalaya Regency - and is named for the Awi River (the prefix "Ci" mean "river"). Ciawi District borders the city of Bogor to its northwest. It covers an area of 25.53 km^{2}, and had a population of 102,994 at the 2010 Census and 114,853 at the 2020 Census; the official estimate as at mid 2024 was 122,271 (comprising 62,812 males and 59,459 females).

The Indonesian Livestock Research Center is located in Ciawi.

== History ==
When the Bogor Regency was selecting a new regency seat in 1975, Ciawi was considered as an option, but was passed over in favor of Cibinong due to Ciawi being too close to Bogor city proper and thus possibly subject to annexation in the future. Indonesia's first toll road, the Jagorawi Toll Road, was opened in 1978, with Ciawi being its terminus. An extension of the toll road, known as the Bocimi Toll Road, similarly passes through Ciawi, connecting Sukabumi to Bogor.

During 2019, there were plans by the neighboring City of Bogor to annex Ciawi into the city. The regency's government has pushed for the Greater Jakarta LRT to be extended up to Ciawi.

== Transport ==
Ciawi possesses a bus terminal serving intercity buses, and is served by a number of Angkot routes.

== Administration ==
The administrative centre is at the town of Bendungan, and the district is sub-divided into thirteen villages (desa), all sharing the postcode of 16720, as listed below with their areas and their populations as at mid 2024.

Kode Wilayah	Name of desa	Area in km^{2}	Population mid 2024 estimate
32.01.24.2001	Cileungsi	7.01	9,125
32.01.24.2002	Citapen	2.69	11,107
32.01.24.2003	Cibedug	2.60	8,781
32.01.24.2010	Bojong Murni	1.60	6,293
32.01.04.2004	Jambu Luwuk	1.01	7,942
32.01.04.2005	Banjar Sari	1.48	10,417
32.01.24.2011	Banjar Wangi	1.10	9,274
32.01.24.2013	Bitung Sari	1.48	8,358
32.01.24.2006	Teluk Pinang	1.25	9,882
32.01.24.2007	Banjar Waru	1.29	10,763
32.01.24.2012	Ciawi (town)	0.80	8,001
32.01.24.2008	Bendungan	1.33	11,623
32.01.24.2009	Pandansari	1.89	10,705
32.01.24	Totals	25.53	122,271
