= AH2 =

Road in Southeast, South, Central and Western Asia

Asian Highway 2

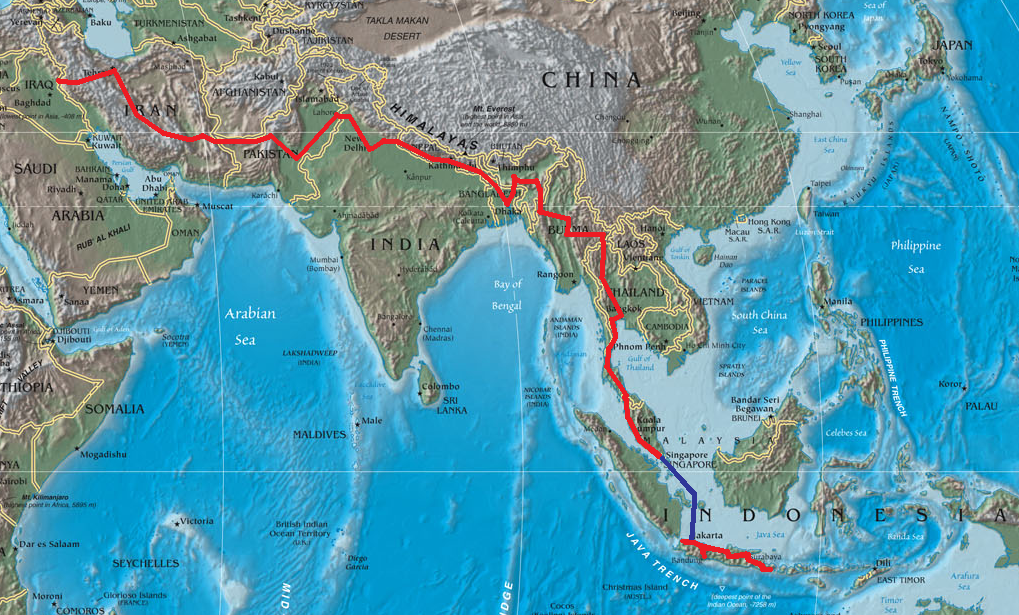

Major junctions
- West end: Khosravi, Iran
- East end: Denpasar, Indonesia

Location
- Countries: Indonesia, Singapore, Malaysia, Thailand, Myanmar, India, Bangladesh, Nepal, Pakistan, Iran

Highway system
- Asian Highway Network
← AH1	→ AH3

Asian Highway 2 (AH2) is a road in the Asian Highway Network running 13,107 kilometres (8,144 mi) from Denpasar, Indonesia to Merak, and Singapore to Khosravi, Iran. The route passes through 10 countries and is connected to routes M10 and M40 of the Arab Mashreq International Road Network. The route is as follows:

== Indonesia ==
Trans-Java Toll Road

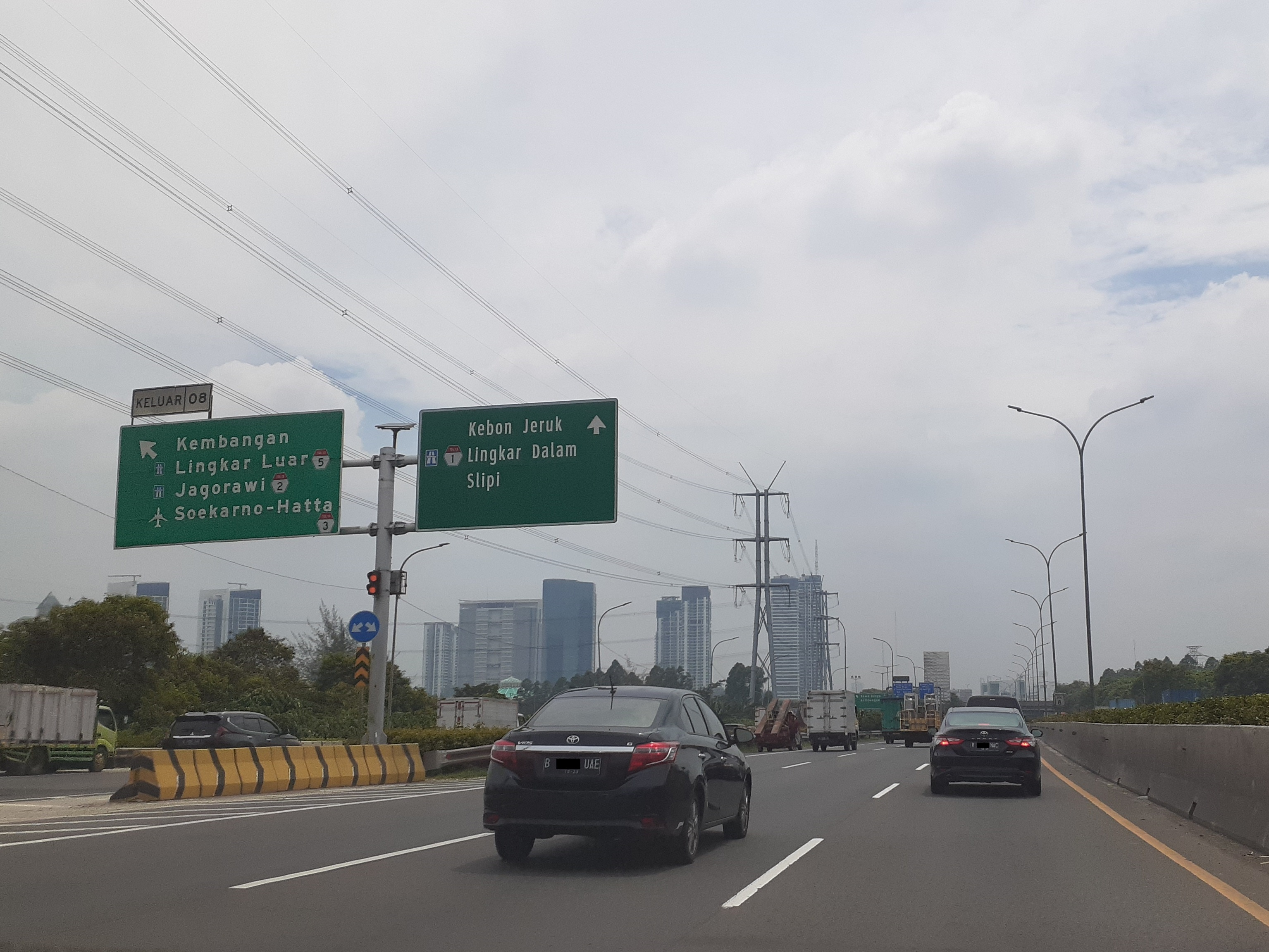
Jakarta–Tangerang Toll Road, in parallel with AH2

National Routes:

- National 1 (Bali Island): Denpasar — Jembrana
- National 1 (Java Island): Banyuwangi — Probolinggo — Surabaya
- National 15: Surabaya — Mojokerto — Ngawi — Surakarta
- National 16: Surakarta — Salatiga — Semarang
- National 1 (Java Island): Semarang — Pekalongan — Tegal — Cirebon — Cikampek — Bekasi — Jakarta — Tangerang — Serang — Cilegon (Merak)
- National 4: Cikampek — Padalarang

Parallel toll roads:

- Bali Mandara Toll Road
- Parts of Trans-Java Toll Road:
  - Gempol–Pasuruan Toll Road, Pasuruan–Probolinggo Toll Road, Probolinggo–Banyuwangi Toll Road (under construction)
  - Surabaya–Gempol Toll Road
  - Kertosono–Mojokerto Toll Road, Surabaya–Mojokerto Toll Road
  - Ngawi–Kertosono Toll Road, Solo–Ngawi Toll Road
  - Semarang Toll Road, Semarang–Solo Toll Road
  - Cikopo–Palimanan Toll Road, Palimanan–Kanci Toll Road, Kanci–Pejagan Toll Road, Pejagan–Pemalang Toll Road, Pemalang–Batang Toll Road, Batang–Semarang Toll Road
  - Jakarta–Cikampek Toll Road
  - Jakarta–Tangerang Toll Road, Tangerang–Merak Toll Road
- Trans-Java Toll Road complements:
  - Cipularang Toll Road

Ferry:

- Port of Gilimanuk, Jembrana Regency
- Port of Ketapang, Banyuwangi Regency
- Port of Tanjung Priok, Jakarta

== Singapore ==
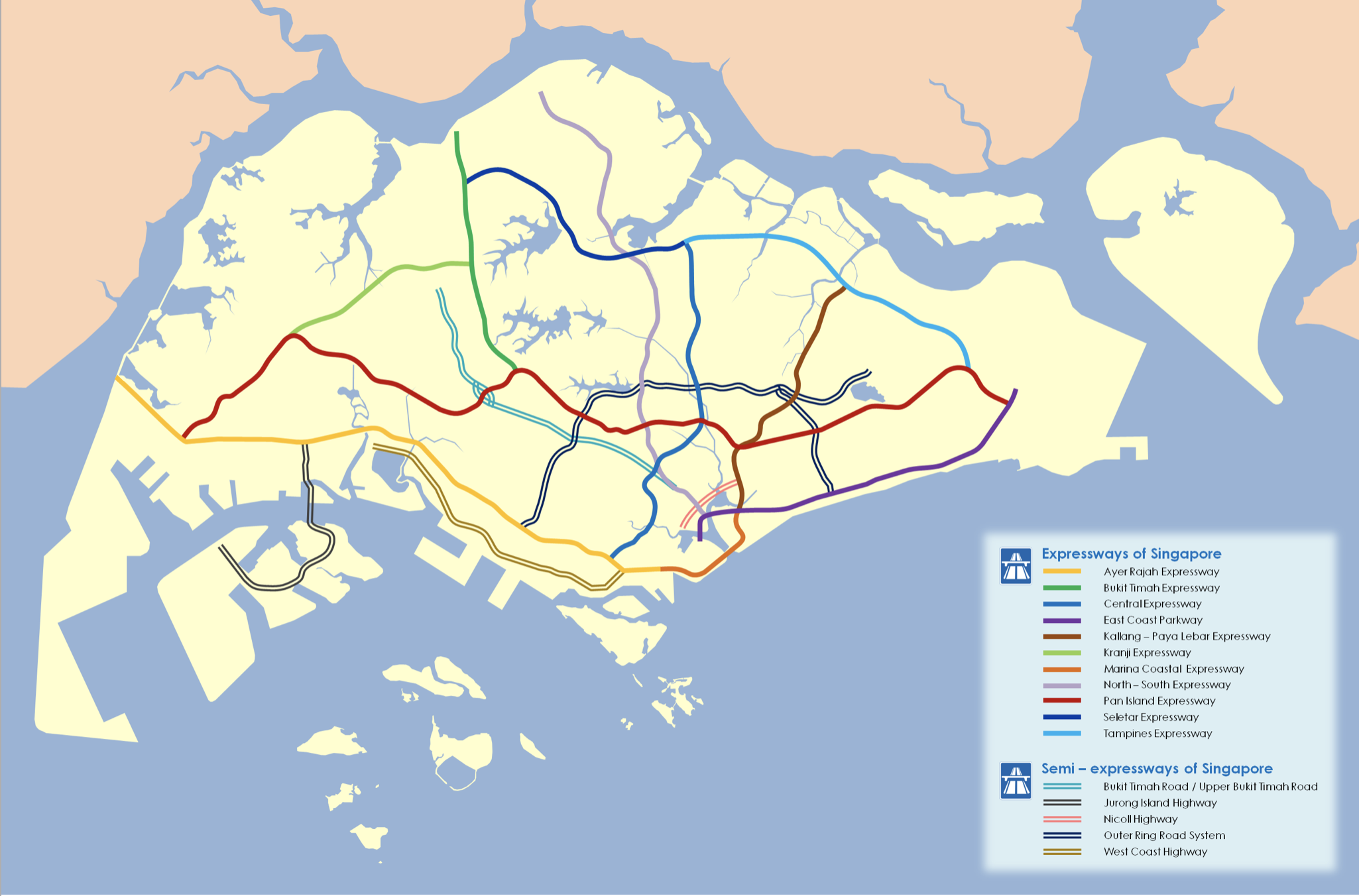

- Clementi Road: West Coast Highway - Jalan Anak Bukit
- Jalan Anak Bukit: Clementi Road - PIE (Anak Bukit Flyover)
- Pan Island Expressway: Jalan Anak Bukit — BKE
- Bukit Timah Expressway: PIE — Woodlands Checkpoint
- Johor–Singapore Causeway

== Malaysia ==
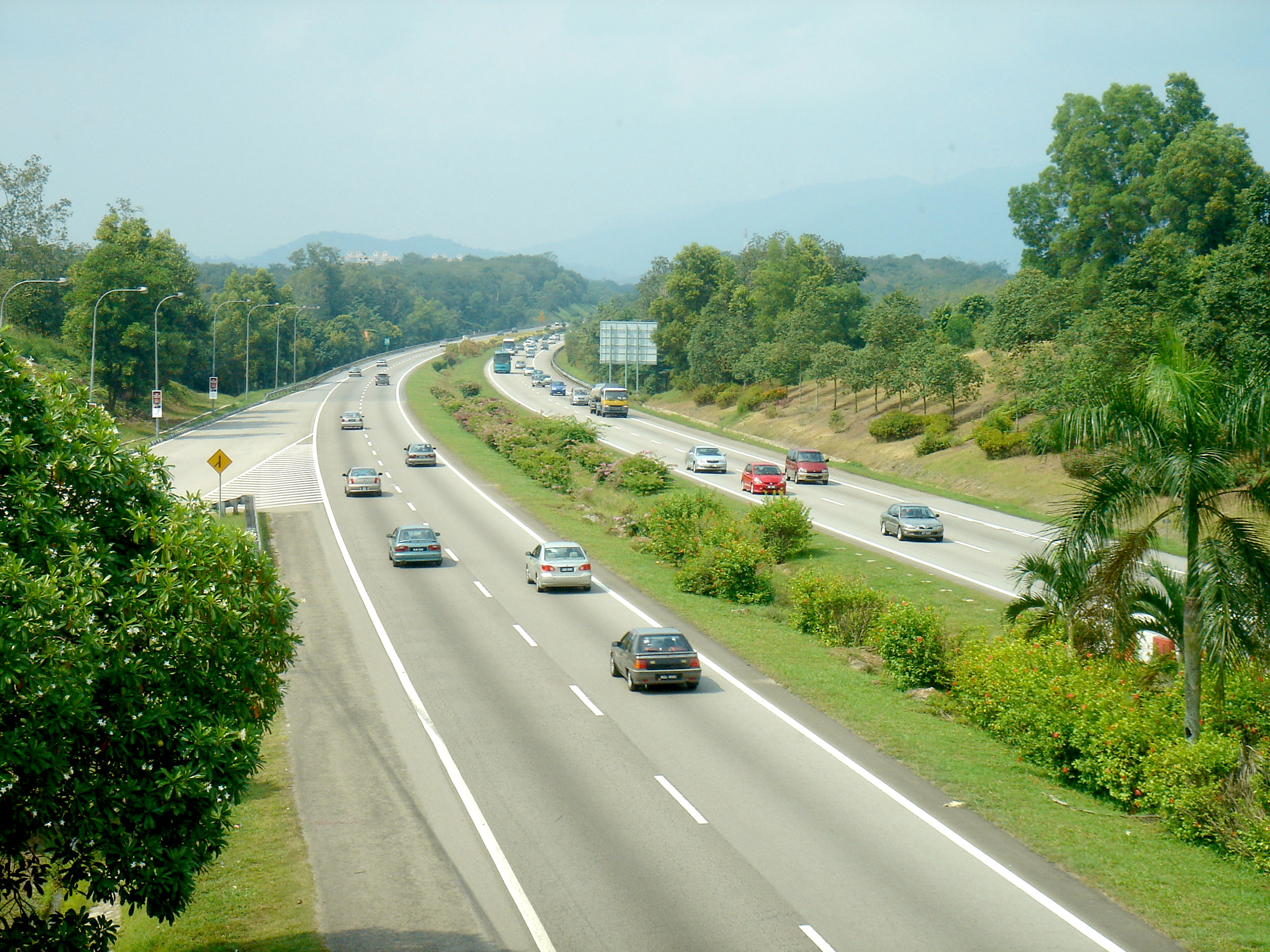
South section of North–South Expressway, facing towards Kuala Lumpur, near Ayer Keroh, Malacca

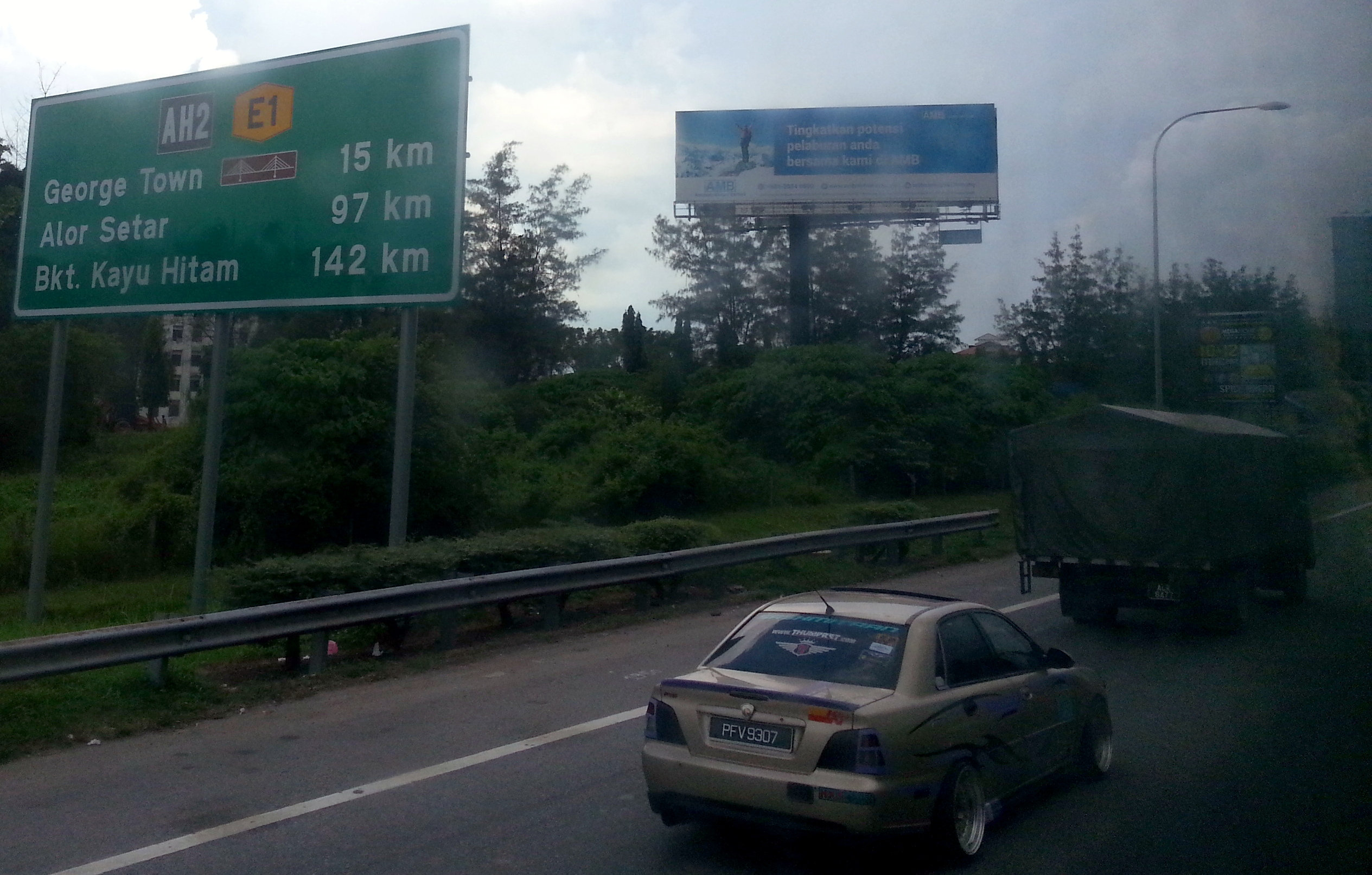
AH2 signage at the Penang section of the North-South Expressway northbound towards Thailand.

- Johor Bahru Eastern Dispersal Link Expressway: Johor Bahru (CIQ checkpoint) — Bakar Batu — Pandan
- North–South Expressway Southern Route: Johor Bahru (Pandan) — Kulai — Batu Pahat — Muar — Ayer Keroh (Malacca) — Seremban — Nilai (North)
- North–South Expressway Central Link: Nilai (North) — Kuala Lumpur International Airport (KLIA) — Bandar Saujana Putra — Putra Heights — USJ — Shah Alam
- New Klang Valley Expressway: Shah Alam — Subang — Damansara — Kota Damansara — Bukit Lanjan (Concurrent with AH141)
- North–South Expressway Northern Route: Bukit Lanjan — Rawang — Tanjung Malim —Tapah — Ipoh — Taiping — Butterworth (Penang) — Sungai Petani — Alor Setar, Bukit Kayu Hitam

== Thailand ==
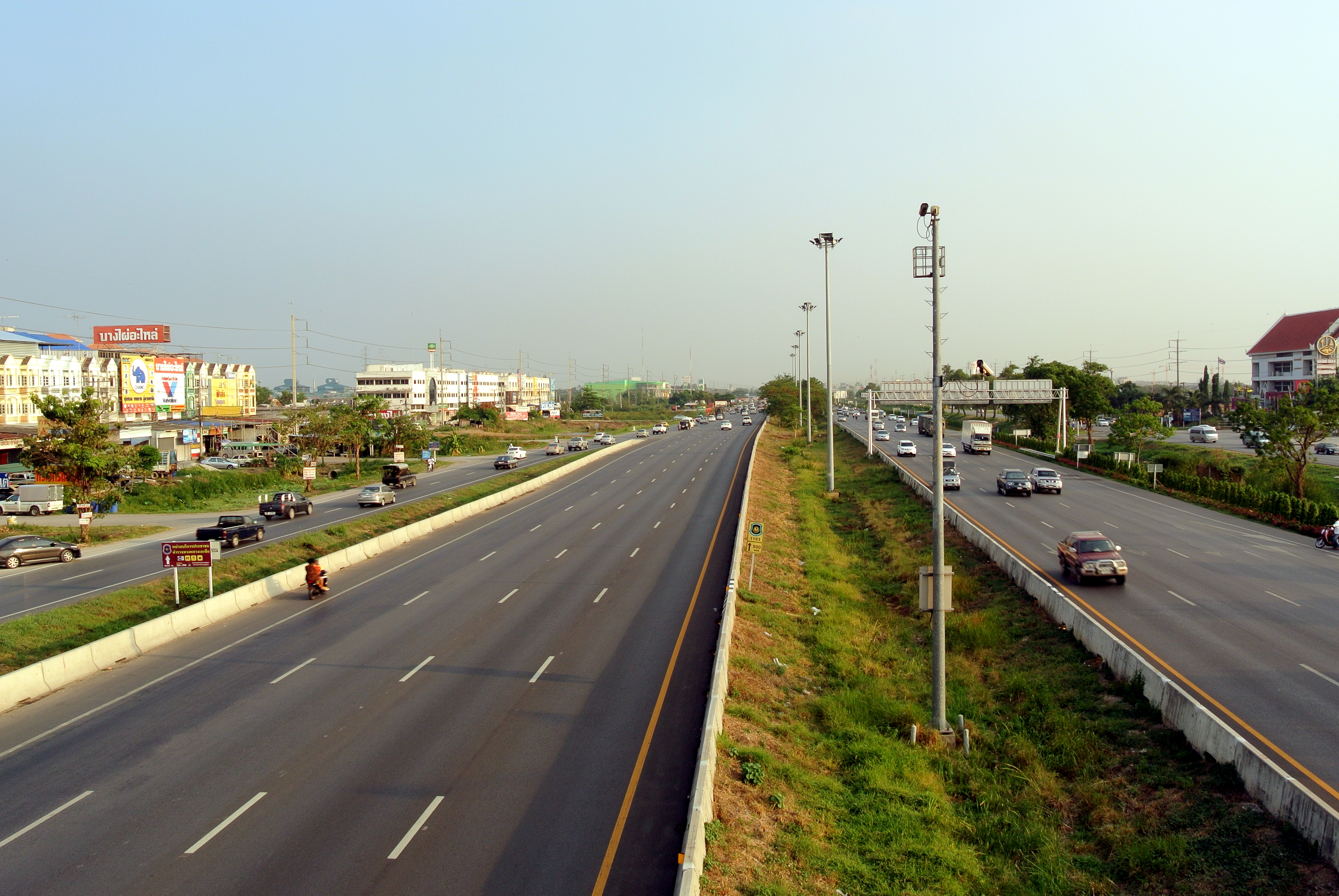
AH1, AH2 and Thailand Route 32 in Ayutthaya

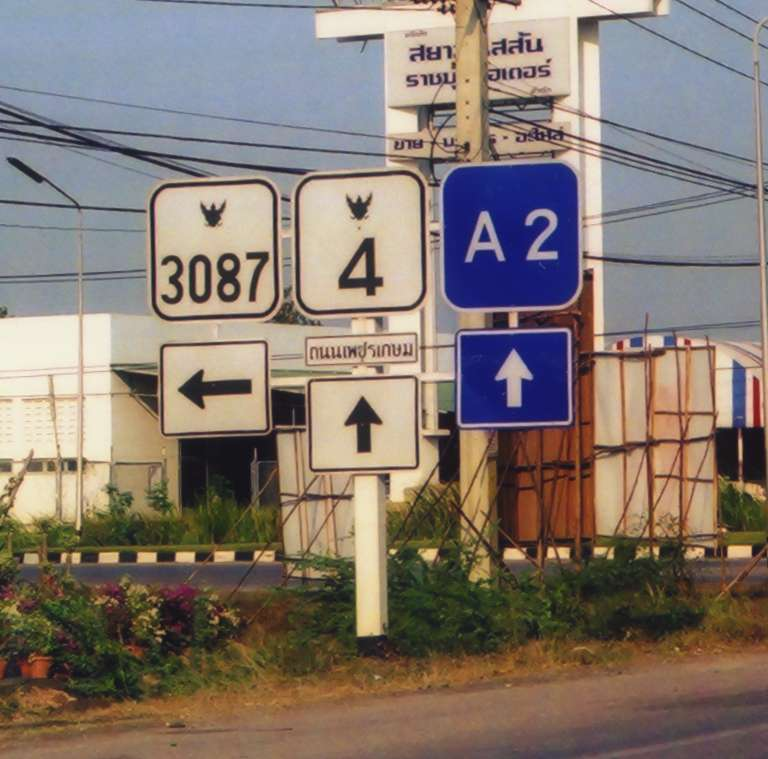
Asian Highway 2 sign near Ratchaburi, Thailand

- Hwy 4: Sa Dao — Hat Yai — Phatthalung, Chumphon — Pran Buri, Cha-am — Nakhon Chai Si (Concurrent with AH123 from Ban Pong — Nakhon Chai Si)
- Hwy 41: Phatthalung — Chumphon
- Hwy 37: Pran Buri — Cha-am (Hua Hin Bypass)
- Hwy 338: Nakhon Chai Si — Bangkok Outer Ring Road (Concurrent with AH123)
- Motorway 9: Bangkok Outer Ring Road — Bang Pa-in
- Hwy 32: Bang Pa-in — Ayutthaya (Bang Pahan) — Chai Nat (Concurrent with AH1) (Merges again at Bang Pahan)
- Hwy 347 :Bang Pa In — Bang Pahan
- Hwy 1: Chai Nat — Nakhon Sawan — Tak — Chiang Rai — Mae Sai (Concurrent with AH1 from Chai Nat — Tak)

== Myanmar ==
- National Highway 4: Tachilek — Kengtung — Meiktila
- Yangon–Mandalay Expressway: Meiktila — Mandalay
- National Highway 7 (Concurrent with AH1): Mandalay — Tamu

== India (Northeast) ==
- NH 102: Moreh — Imphal
- NH 2: Imphal — Viswema — Kohima
- NH 29: Kohima — Chümoukedima — Dimapur — Nagaon — Doboka
- NH 27: Doboka — Jorabat
- NH 6: Jorabat — Shillong
- NH 206: Shillong — Dawki

== Bangladesh ==
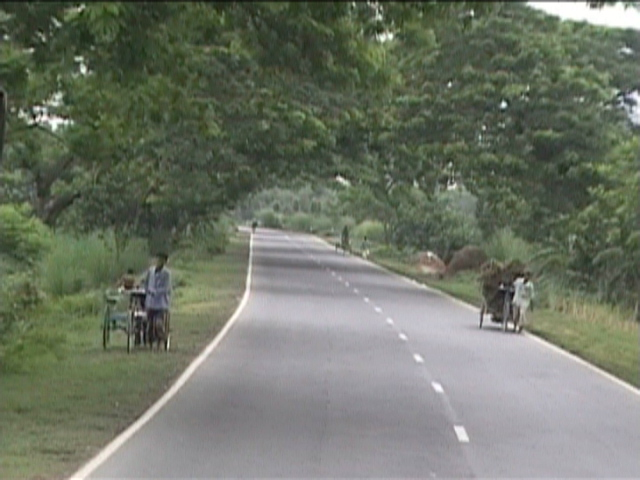
AH2 and N5 national highway in Bogra, Bangladesh

- N2: Tamabil — Sylhet — Kanchpur — Dhaka
- N3: Dhaka — Joydebpur
- N4: Joydebpur — Tangail — Elenga
- N405: Elenga — Hatikumrul
- N5: Hatikumrul — Bogra — Rangpur — Banglabandha

== India (East) ==
- NH 27: Mehsi — Fulbari — Siliguri
- NH 327: Siliguri — Panitanki
- NH 327B: Panitanki — Mechi Bridge

== Nepal ==
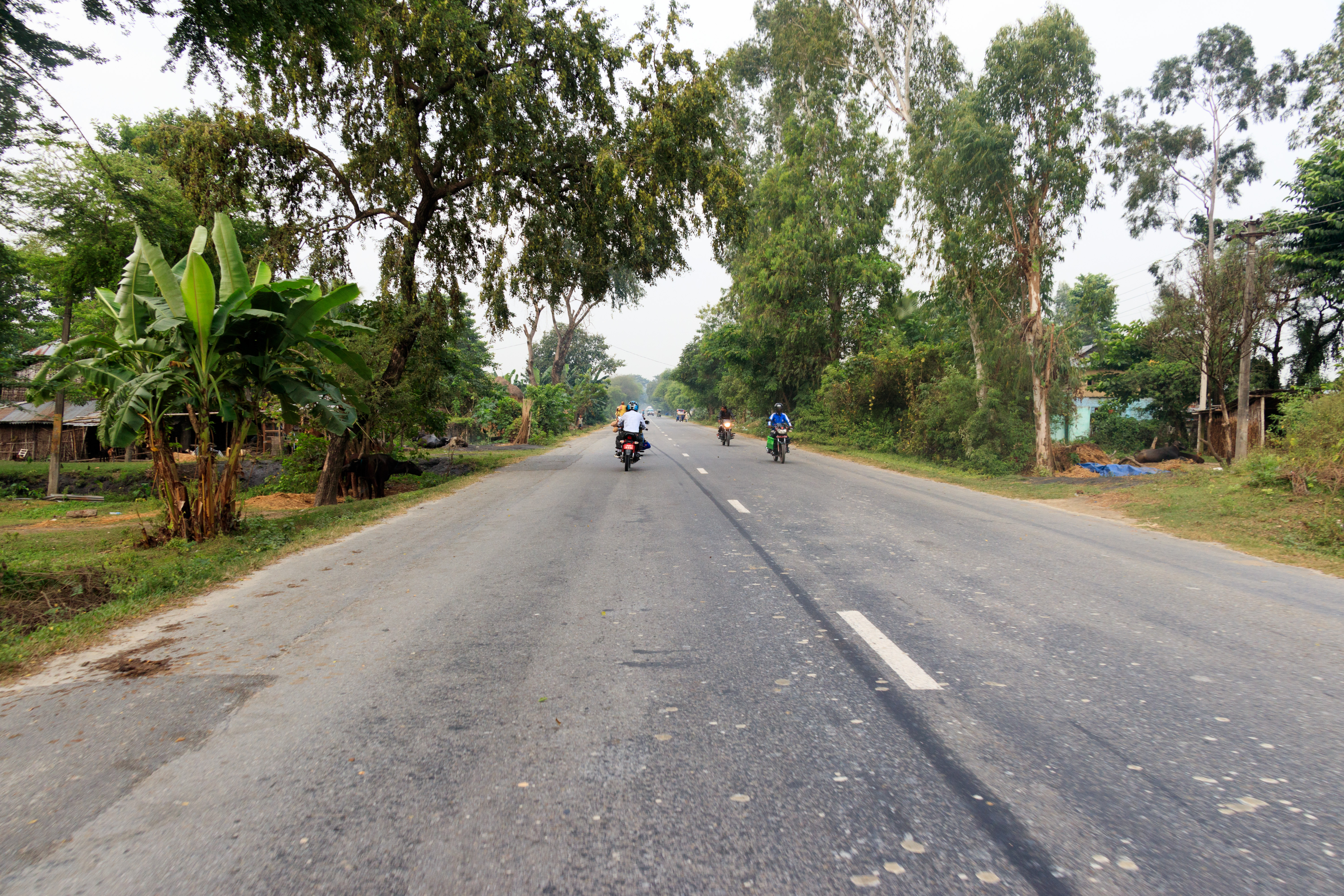
NH01 (Mahendra Highway) in Nepal between Inaruwa and Katan

- NH01 (Mahendra Highway) : Mechi Bridge — Kakarbhitta — Pathlaiya — Hetauda — Narayangarh — Butwal — Kohalpur — Mahendranagar — Mahakali River

== India (North) ==
- Mahakali River — Banbasa — Khatima
- NH 9: Khatima — Sitarganj — Rudrapur — Rampur — Muradabad — Amroha (Gajraula) — Hapur — Delhi
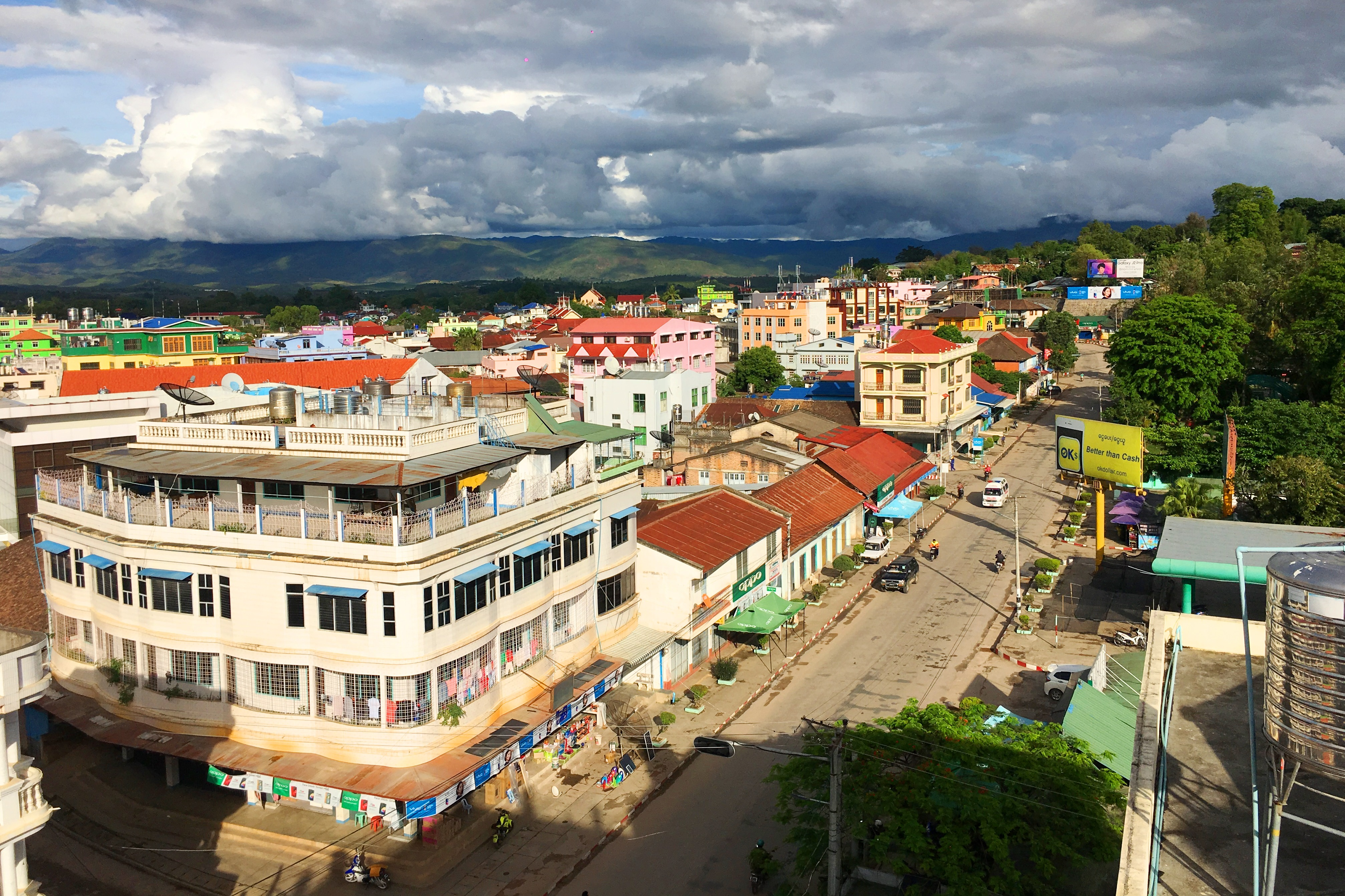
  National Highway (NH4) passes through Kengtung
- NH 44: Delhi — Sonipat- Kurukshetra — Ambala — Ludhiana — Phagwara — Jalandhar
- NH 3: Jalandhar — Amritsar — Attari

== Pakistan ==
- Wagah — Lahore
- Lahore — Okara — Multan — Bahawalpur — Rahim Yar Khan — Rohri
- Rohri — Sukkur — Jacobabad — Sibi — Quetta
- Quetta — Dalbandin — Taftan

== Iran ==
- :Mirjaveh — Zahedan — Kerman — Anar
- :Anar — Kashan — Qom
- :Qom — Salafchegan
- :Salafchegan — Saveh
- :Saveh — Hamadan
- :Hamadan — Kermanshah — Khosravi

== Other roads ==
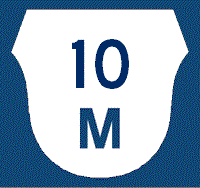
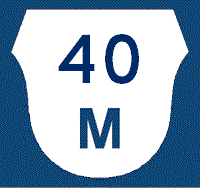
( Arab Mashreq International Road Network)
