= Penicillium javanicum =

Scientific classification
- Kingdom: Fungi
- Division: Ascomycota
- Class: Eurotiomycetes
- Order: Eurotiales
- Family: Aspergillaceae
- Genus: Penicillium
- Species: P. javanicum

Binomial name
- Penicillium javanicum Beyma, F.H. van. 1929

Type strain
- ATCC 9099, Biourge 107, CBS 341.48, CSIR 831, FRR 0707, IFO 31735, IMI 039733, MUCL 29099, MUCL 38760, NBIMCC 1868, NBRC 31735, NRRL 707, QM 1876, Thom 5117

Synonyms
- Carpenteles javanicum, Penicillium ehrlichii, Penicillium oligosporum, Eupenicillium erubescens, Eupenicillium javanicum, Eupenicillium ludwigii, Eupenicillium zonatum

Species of fungus

Penicillium javanicum is an anamorph species of the genus of Penicillium which produces xathomegnin.
