= Bogor–Ciawi–Sukabumi Toll Road =

Toll road in Indonesia

Bogor–Ciawi–Sukabumi Bocimi

Route information
- Maintained by PT Trans Jabar Tol (TJT)
- Length: 53.6 km (33.3 mi)
- Existed: 2018–present

Major junctions
- Northwest end: Ciawi Interchange
- Jagorawi Toll Road; Jakarta Outer Ring Road 2
- Southeast end: Sukabumi Interchange

Location
- Country: Indonesia
- Provinces: West Java
- Major cities: Bogor; Bogor Regency; Sukabumi Regency; Sukabumi

Highway system
- Transport in Indonesia

Bogor–Ciawi–Sukabumi Toll Road or Bocimi Toll Road is a controlled-access toll road of 53.6-kilometre (33.3 mi), which is under construction that will connect Bogor Regency, Bogor city, Sukabumi Regency and Sukabumi city in West Java, Indonesia. The 15.35-kilometre (9.54 mi) first section of the toll road between Ciawi and Cigombong was inaugurated by Indonesia's President Joko Widodo on 3 December 2018.

== Sections ==
Bocimi Toll Road consists of four sections:

- Section I (Ciawi - Cigombong) 15.3 km (9.5 mi), formally opened on 1 December 2018.
- Section II (Cigombong - Cibadak) 12 km (7.5 mi), inaugurated on 4 August 2023.
- Section III (Cibadak - Cisaat) 14 km (8.7 mi), under-construction, and
- Section IV (Cisaat - Sukaraja) 13 km (8.1 mi), pre-development.

Section I of the toll road has been fully operational since 2019. The cost of this toll road is estimated at around Rp 7.7 trillion.

Section II of the toll road was inaugurated on 4 August 2023, with an estimated project cost of around Rp 3.2 trillion.

Section III of the toll road is still under-construction, and scheduled for its completion on 2nd terms of 2026.

Section IV of the toll road still undergoing pre-development and land acquisition.

The whole toll road is expected to be fully functional by 2028.

== History ==
According to BPJT (Indonesian Toll Road Authority), a Concession Toll Road Agreement (PPJT) was initially signed by consortium PT. Bukaka Teknik Utama (PT Bukaka Teknik Utama 35%, PT. Graha Multitama Sejahtera 32.5%, PT. Karya Perkasa Insani 33.5%). In 2011, Bakrie group took over the majority shareholder of this toll road segment with PT. Trans Jabar Toll as operator. The composition of the shareholder were Bakrie Toll Road 60%, PT. Marga Sarana Jabar 25%, and PT. Bukaka Teknik Utama 15%. By the year 2014, MNC group acquired PT Bakrie Toll Road. Unfortunately, the Bocimi Toll Road project was not performed well. Finally, the progress of this project has been increasing significantly since PT. Waskita Toll Road become the shareholder majority of PT. Trans Jabar Toll in 2015. PT. Waskita Toll Road has 81.64% of shareholder while the rest are PT. Bukaka Mega Investama and PT. Jasa Sarana.

== Exits ==
Province	Location	km	mi	Exit	Name	Destinations	Notes
West Java	East Bogor, Bogor	47.2	29.3	Jagorawi Toll Road			
West Java	South Bogor, Bogor	48.5	30.1	48	Ciawi Selatan Toll Gate	Ciawi; Tajur; Puncak	Northern terminus; North-bound exit & South-bound entry only
West Java	Caringin, Bogor Regency	53.2	33.1	53	Caringin Toll Gate	Caringin; Cikereteg; Cijeruk	
West Java	Cigombong, Bogor Regency	60.0	37.3	60	Cigombong Toll Gate	Cigombong; Cicurug	
West Java	Parungkuda, Sukabumi Regency			72	Parungkuda Toll Gate	Parungkuda; Cibadak; Palabuhanratu	
West Java	1.000 mi = 1.609 km; 1.000 km = 0.621 mi: Electronic toll collection; Incomplete access; Route transition; Unopened						

== See also ==
- Trans-Java toll road
