= Probolinggo–Banyuwangi Toll Road =

Toll Road in Indonesia

Probolinggo–Situbondo-Banyuwangi Toll Road
- Jalan Tol Probolinggo-Situbondo–Banyuwangi
- Prosiwangi Toll Road

Route information
- Part of AH2
- Maintained by PT Jasa Marga Probolinggo Banyuwangi (JPB)
- Length: 163.83 km (101.80 mi)
- Status: Under construction

Major junctions
- Northwest end: Probolinggo
- AH2 – Pasuruan–Probolinggo Toll Road
- Southeast end: Port of Ketapang

Location
- Country: Indonesia
- Provinces: East Java
- Major cities: Probolinggo Regency; Situbondo Regency; Banyuwangi Regency

Highway system
- Transport in Indonesia

Probolinggo–Situbondo-Banyuwangi Toll Road (Prosiwangi Toll Road) is a controlled-access toll road in East Java. The toll road will connect Probolinggo Regency, Situbondo Regency and Banyuwangi Regency. The toll road will be integrated with Port of Ketapang to allow crossing from Java to Bali. The toll road is the final phase of Trans-Java Toll Road with Port of Merak on the western end. It is currently under route planning phase, but the construction of the first phase of this toll road was expected to be operational around 2024.

== History ==
The groundbreaking for the first section of the toll road was done on 6 February 2023 by the Minister of Public Works and Housing, Basuki Hadimuljono with expectations that the first phase will be operating in 2024.

== Sections ==
The toll road is divided into 6 sections:

- Section 1: Kraksaan–Paiton, 15.75 km (9.79 mi)
- Section 2: Paiton–Besuki, 21.89 km (13.60 mi)
- Section 3: Besuki–Situbondo, 43.48 km (27.02 mi)
- Section 4: Situbondo–Asembagus, 17.65 km (10.97 mi)
- Section 5: Asembagus–Bajulmati, 43.61 km (27.10 mi)
- Section 6: Bajulmati–Ketapang, 21.45 km (13.33 mi)

== Exits ==
Province	Location	km	mi	Exit	Name	Destinations	Notes
East Java	Gending, Probolinggo Regency	848.5	527.2	849 (863)	Gending Toll Gate	Gending; Probolinggo; Pasuruan-Probolinggo Toll Road	Western terminus
East Java	Kraksaan, Probolinggo Regency	859.2	533.9	860 (874)	Kraksaan Toll Gate	Pajarakan; Kraksaan	
East Java	Paiton, Probolinggo Regency	872.3	542.0	873 (887)	Paiton Toll Gate	Jabung; Paiton	
East Java	Besuki, Situbondo Regency	898.0	558.0	899 (913)	Situbondo Barat Toll Gate	Besuki; Bondowoso; Jember	
East Java	Situbondo Regency			942 (956)	Situbondo Toll Gate	Situbondo; Panarukan	
East Java	Asembagus, Situbondo Regency			959 (973)	Asembagus Toll Gate	Asembagus; Banyuputih; Ijen	
East Java	Bajulmati, Banyuwangi Regency			996 (1010)	Bajulmati Toll Gate	Bajulmati; Baluran; Wongsorejo	
East Java	Ketapang, Banyuwangi Regency			1025 (1039)	Ketapang Toll Gate	Port of Ketapang; Banyuwangi	Planned terminus of the Trans-Java Toll Road
1.000 mi = 1.609 km; 1.000 km = 0.621 mi: Route transition; Unopened

== See also ==
- Trans-Java Toll Road
