= Pekalongan =

City in Central Java, Indonesia

- City
- City of Pekalongan; Kota Pekalongan

Other transcription(s)
  - Hanacaraka: ꦥꦼꦏꦭꦺꦴꦁꦔꦤ꧀
  - Pegon: ڤٓكالَوڠان
  - Chinese: 北加隆岸; Běi jiā lóng àn (Pinyin)
  - Dutch: Pacalongan
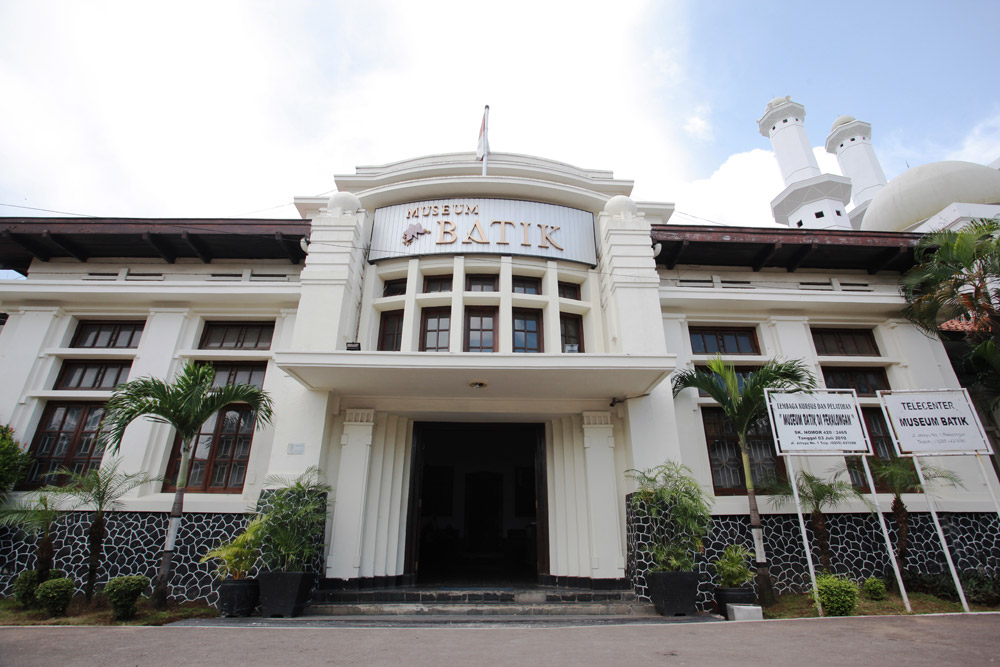
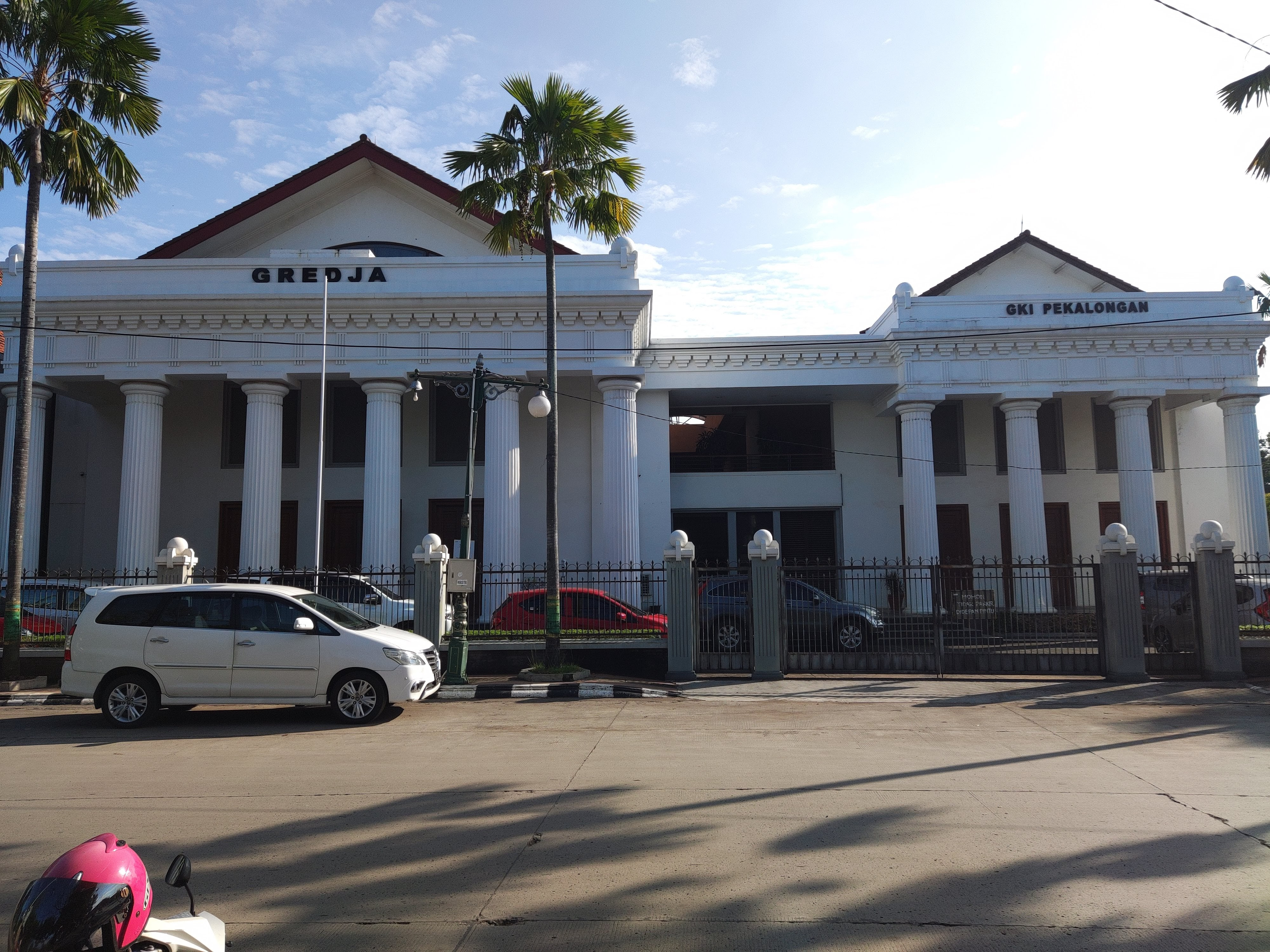
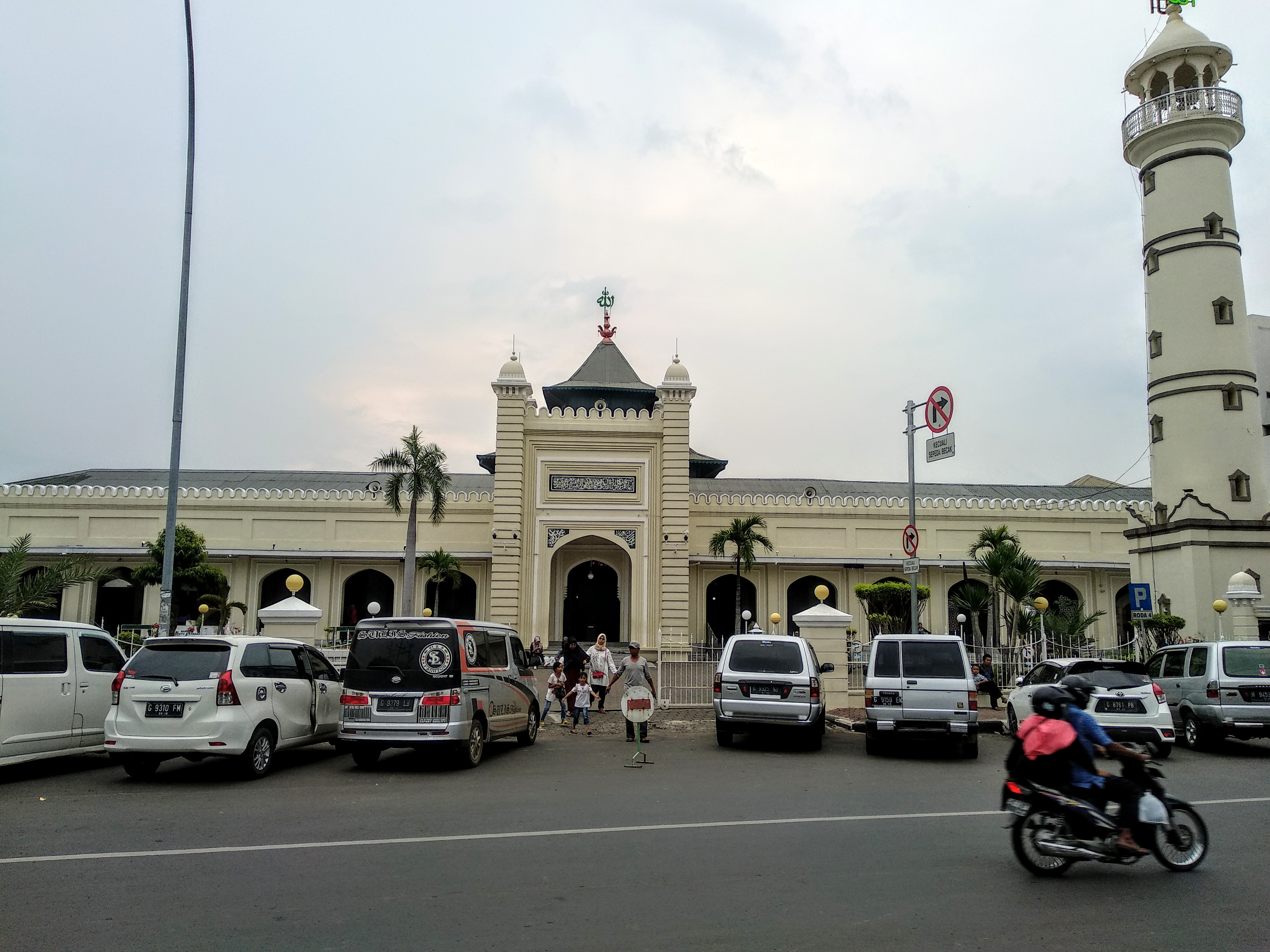
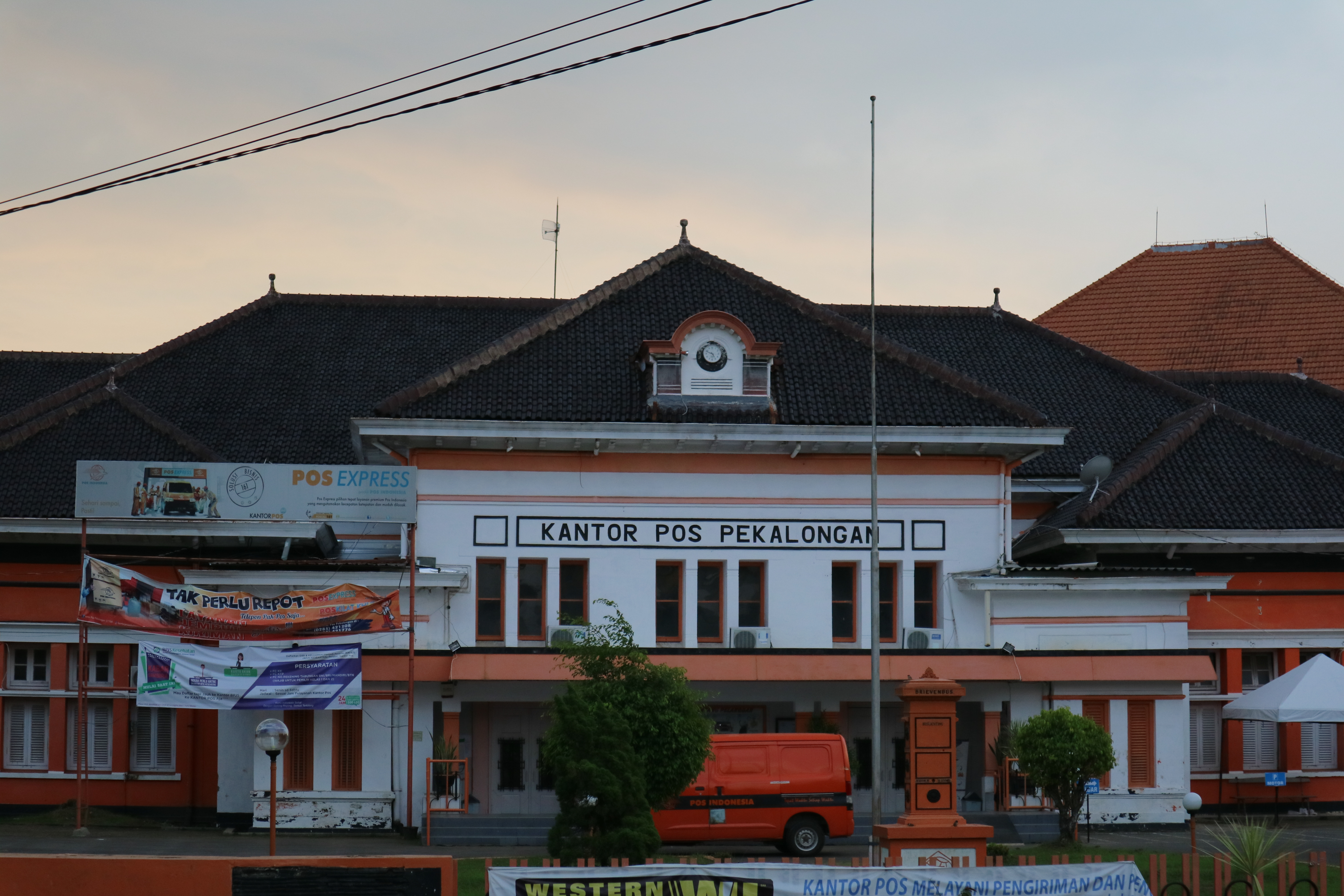
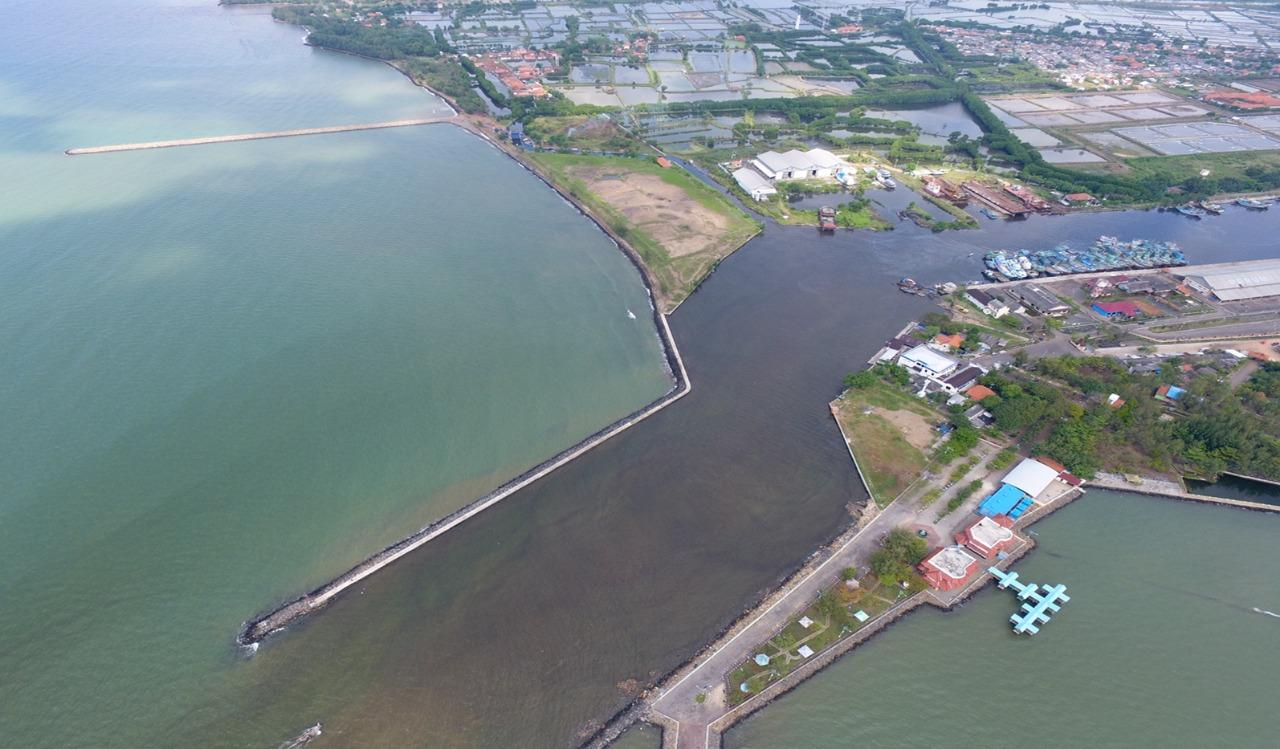
- Clockwise, from above : Pekalongan Batik Museum, Al-Jami' Grand Mosque, Pekalongan Fish Harbour, Pekalongan Post Office, Indonesia Christian Church of Pekalongan

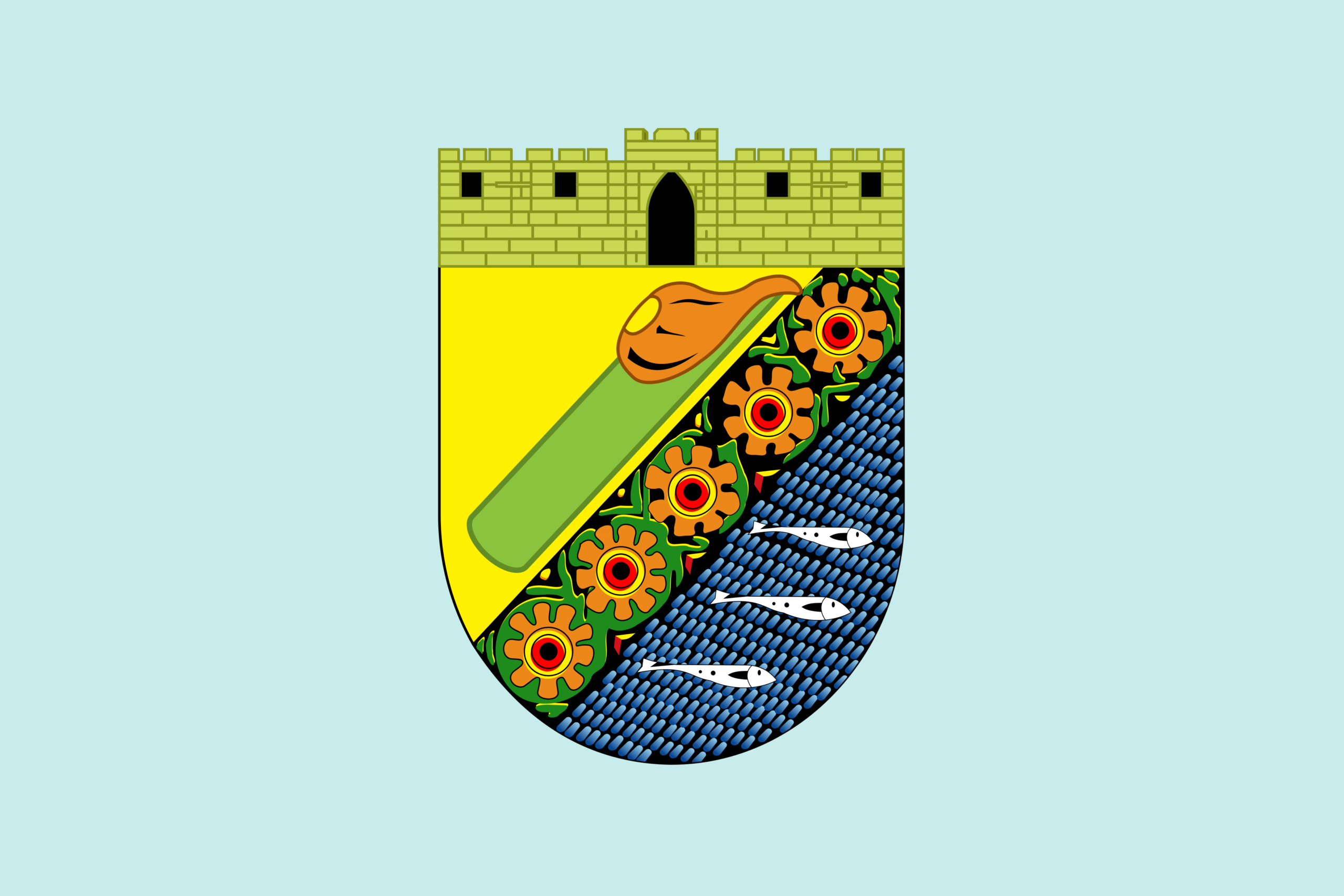
- Flag Coat of arms
- Nickname: Kota Batik (lit. 'the Batik city')
- Motto: Pekalongan Kota BATIK (Bersih (Clean), Aman (Safe), Tertib (Discipline), Indah (Beautiful), Komunikatif (Communicative))
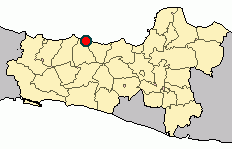
- Location within Central Java

- Location in Java and Indonesia Pekalongan (Indonesia)
- Coordinates: 6°53′S 109°40′E
- Country: Indonesia
- Province: Central Java
- Established: 1 April 1906

Government
  - Mayor: Achmad Afzan Arslan Djunaid
  - Vice Mayor: Salahudin

Area
  - Total: 45.25 km^{2} (17.47 sq mi)

Population (mid 2025 estimate)
  - Total: 324,564
  - Density: 7,173/km^{2} (18,580/sq mi)
- Time zone: UTC+7 (Western Indonesia Time)
- Area code: (+62) 285
- HDI (2023): ▲0.759 (2022); High
- Website: pekalongankota.go.id

Pekalongan (Javanese: ꦥꦼꦏꦭꦺꦴꦁꦔꦤ꧀) is a city of Central Java, Indonesia. It was formerly the seat of Pekalongan Regency on the northern coast of the province, but is now an independent municipality within the province. It covers a land area of 45.25 km^{2} and had a population of 281,434 at the 2010 Census and 307,150 at the 2020 Census; the official estimate as of mid-2025 was 324,564 (comprising 163,880 males and 160,690 females). The city is Central Java's most important port, and is known for its batik. Since December 2014, Pekalongan has been a member of UNESCO's World's Creative Cities Network, the first Southeast Asian city to be added to the list.

The Dutch name of the city is 'Pacalongan'.

== History ==
The coastal area around Pekalongan was part of the ancient Holing (Kalingga) kingdom. The 7th century Sojomerto inscription, discovered in neighboring Batang Regency, Central Java, is linked with Kalingga as well as the ancestor of the Sailendras. The exact location of the Kalingga capital is unclear. It has been suggested that it was somewhere between Pekalongan and Jepara; however it is most likely that it was located in Pekalongan, rather than Jepara, since there is similarity of names between Kalingga and Pekalongan. The name probably slightly shifted over centuries, from Kalingga, Kaling, Kalong, and later added with pe- -an circumfix forming "Pekalongan".

The history of Pekalongan dates back to the early 12th century. A book written in 1178 by a Song dynasty official already had a record of Pekalongan, then known to Chinese merchants as "Pukalong". It was then a seaport of Java (then known as Dvapa). The king of Java lived at Pukalong - he knotted his hair at the back of his head, while his people had short hair and wrapped their body with colorfully woven cloth. A Chinese merchant ship set sail from Canton during November, and with the aid of fair winds sailed nonstop day and night, arriving at Pukalong after about one month. The people made wine from coconuts, and produced delicious red and white cane sugar. The kingdom made coins out of bronze and copper, with 60 copper coins exchanged for one tael of gold. Local produce included pepper, clove, sandalwood, eaglewood and white round cardamom.

Pekalongan became a part of the empire of the Sultanate of Mataram through treaties and marriage alliances by the early 17th century. The area was on the geographic periphery of the empire, which was based in interior central Java. However, it was a wealthy area, and by the end of the 17th century, the substantial money and produce it sent to the center made it a key part of Mataram's realm. The area went into economic decline during the 18th century, and the Dutch East India Company began to gain substantial influence over the area's political and economic life. The Dutch built a fort in the city in 1753; this fort still stands.

Coat of Arms of Pekalongan during colonial era, this version adopted from 1930s.

From the 1830s, the Pekalongan area became a major producer of sugar. Sugarcane had been grown in the area since the early 12th century, as recorded in Chinese history books, but production expanded substantially during the mid-19th century due to Dutch efforts. Initially, production was boosted through compulsory corvée labor. The Dutch colonial government took advantage of longstanding Javanese expectations that the peasantry contribute a part of their labor to the state. Between the 1860s and the 1890s, this system was phased out, and workers were paid directly. The colonial sugar industry collapsed during the Great Depression of the 1930s, but sugar remains a key export of the area in independent Indonesia.

On 8 October 1945, an anti "Swapraja"/anti feudalism movement called Three Regions Movement/"Gerakan Tiga Daerah" was established in Tegal, Pekalongan, and Brebes. The goal of this movement was to replace the blue blood regents (related to the kings from Jogyakarta and Surakarta) with ordinary people. According to the leaders of this movement, the old regents had cooperated with Japanese during World War II and sent people to Japanese slave labor camps.

The main leader of this movement was Sarjiyo, who became the new regent of Pekalongan. Other leaders of this movement were Kutil, K. Mijaya, and Ir. Sakirman. Ir Sakirman was the local leader of Indonesian Communist Party (PKI).

The old regents were arrested, stripped naked, and dragged into the prisons. Other government officials and police officers were kidnapped and massacred at Talang bridge. This movement also started a racial riot against ethnic Chinese in Brebes.

The government of Republic of Indonesia in Jogyakarta disagreed with this movement and declared it was illegal. On 4 November 1945, the movement attacked the Indonesian army HQ and the regent's office in Pekalongan. The rebels were defeated by Indonesian army in a fierce battle on 21 December 1945. Most leaders of this movement were arrested and thrown into the prisons. This rebellion is known as the Three Regions Affair.

== Geography ==
Pekalongan city extends between 6°50'42"–6°55'44" South latitude and 109°37'55"–109°42'19" East longitude. The farthest distance from north to south is ± 9 km, and west to east is ± 7 km. The administrative borders of Pekalongan city are:

North	Java Sea
South	Pekalongan Regency and Batang Regency
West	Pekalongan Regency
East	Batang Regency

The built-up area of Pekalongan extends beyond the city limits to include significant suburban populations in both Pekalongan Regency to the west and south (notably Buaran, Siwalan, Tirto, Wiradesa and Wonokerto Districts which together cover 91.20 km^{2} and had a population of 282,652 in mid 2025) and Batang Regency to the east (particularly Batang District and Warungasem District). At the 1990 Census the urban area (kawasan perkotaan) had a population of 417,744.

== Climate ==
Pekalongan has a tropical rainforest climate (Af) with moderate rainfall from June to October and heavy to very heavy rainfall from November to May.

Climate data for Pekalongan
Month	Jan	Feb	Mar	Apr	May	Jun	Jul	Aug	Sep	Oct	Nov	Dec	Year
Mean daily maximum °C (°F)	29.4 (84.9)	29.7 (85.5)	30.6 (87.1)	31.3 (88.3)	31.5 (88.7)	31.6 (88.9)	31.8 (89.2)	32.0 (89.6)	32.6 (90.7)	32.5 (90.5)	31.5 (88.7)	30.5 (86.9)	31.3 (88.3)
Daily mean °C (°F)	25.5 (77.9)	25.8 (78.4)	26.5 (79.7)	27.0 (80.6)	27.1 (80.8)	26.7 (80.1)	26.5 (79.7)	26.5 (79.7)	27.1 (80.8)	27.3 (81.1)	26.9 (80.4)	26.2 (79.2)	26.6 (79.9)
Mean daily minimum °C (°F)	21.7 (71.1)	21.9 (71.4)	22.4 (72.3)	22.7 (72.9)	22.7 (72.9)	21.8 (71.2)	21.2 (70.2)	21.0 (69.8)	21.6 (70.9)	22.1 (71.8)	22.3 (72.1)	22.0 (71.6)	22.0 (71.5)
Average rainfall mm (inches)	572 (22.5)	408 (16.1)	283 (11.1)	151 (5.9)	144 (5.7)	84 (3.3)	93 (3.7)	87 (3.4)	80 (3.1)	104 (4.1)	147 (5.8)	295 (11.6)	2,448 (96.3)
Source: Climate-Data.org

== Administrative districts ==
Districts of Pekalongan

Pekalongan city is divided into four districts, listed below with their areas and their populations as of 2010 and 2020 Censuses, together with the official estimates as of mid-2025. The table also includes the number of administrative villages (all classed as urban kelurahan) in each district, and their post codes.

Kode Wilayah	Name of District (kecamatan)	Area in km^{2}	Pop'n Census 2010	Pop'n Census 2020	Pop'n Estimate mid 2025	No. of villages	Post codes
33.75.01	Pekalongan Barat (West Pekalongan)	10.05	88,732	94,829	98,757	7	51111-51113, 51116-51117 ^{(a)}
33.75.02	Pekalongan Timur (East Pekalongan)	9.52	62,611	68,750	71,199	7	51122-51124, 51127-51129
33.75.03	Pekalongan Utara (North Pekalongan)	10.80	55,069	65,176	73,051	6	51141, 51143, 51146-51149
33.75.04	Pekalongan Selatan (South Pekalongan)	14.88	75,022	78,395	81,557	7	51132-51135, 51138-51139
	Totals	45.25	281,434	307,150	324,564	27	

Note: (a) except the kelurahan of Tirto, which has a post code of 51151.

== Transportation ==
Pekalongan is a road and rail crossing point between Jakarta and Surabaya. Pekalongan is connected to the Trans-Java Expressway by the Pemalang-Batang Toll Road. All passenger trains from west or east stop at Pekalongan train station.

== Tourism Places ==
Pekalongan has many tourism places, such as:

- Batik Museum
- Kauman Batik Tourism Village
- Pesindon Batik Tourism Village
- Medono ATBM (Non Automatic Weaving Machine) Tourism Village
- Landungsari Canting Tourism Village
- Pasir Kencana Beach
- Slamaran Indah Beach
- Pekalongan Mangrove Park
- Heroes Monument
- Jetayu Culture Area

== Business ==
The city is known for its batik. The dyed fabric is produced both by hand in small-scale businesses, and is printed in larger factories. A mainstay of the economy, the industry collapsed during Indonesia's economic crisis in 1998, but it has partially recovered since. Pekalongan has many business and industries, such as :

- Traditional (wood) and Modern (fiberglass) Shipyard
- Small-scale batik industries
- Small-scale snack industries
- Fishing Port
- Fish canning factory
- Shopping mall
- Luxury Hotels

== Prominent inhabitants ==
- Abdul Halim bin Karto (1860–1943), former Justice of the peace and Islamic missionary
- George Junus Aditjondro, (1946-2016), sociologist
- Beb Bakhuys, (1909-1982), Dutch football player and manager
- Hartono Rekso Dharsono, (1925-1996), first Secretary General of ASEAN
- Abdul Rahman Saleh, (1941-), former Attorney General of Indonesia
- Hoegeng Iman Santoso, (1921-2004), (former Chief of the Indonesian National Police)
- Thio Tjin Boen, (1885-1940), novelist
- Joe Hin Tjio, (1919-2001), scientist
- Muhammad Ridho Djazulie, (1992-), Indonesian professional footballer

== Sources ==
- Knight, G.R. (1995) Gully Coolies, Weed-Women and Snijvolk: The Sugar Industry Workers of North Java in the Early Twentieth Century. Modern Asian Studies 28(1):51-76.
- Ricklefs, M.C. (1986) Some Statistical Evidence on Javanese Social, Economic and Demographic History in the Later Seventeenth and Eighteenth Centuries. Modern Asian Studies 20(1):1-32.

== Gallery ==
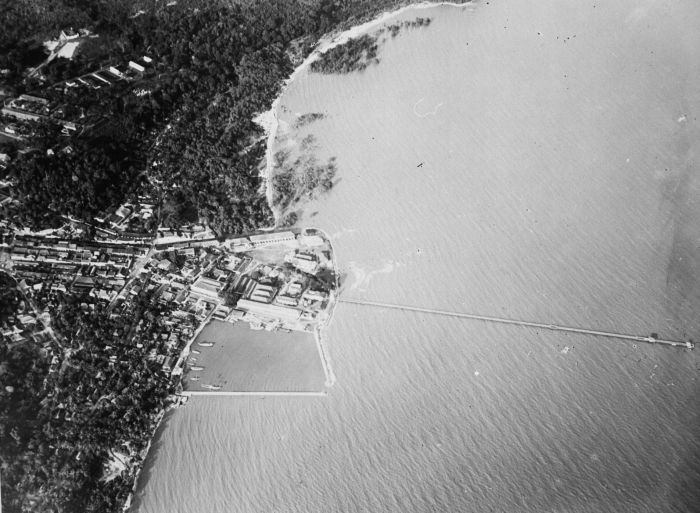
Pekalongan harbour (ca.1933-40)

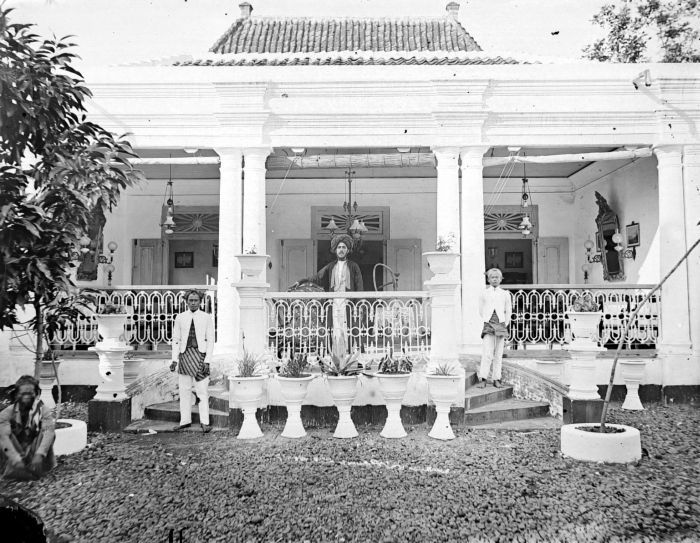
A large residence in Pekalongan used by the "Captain of The Arabs"

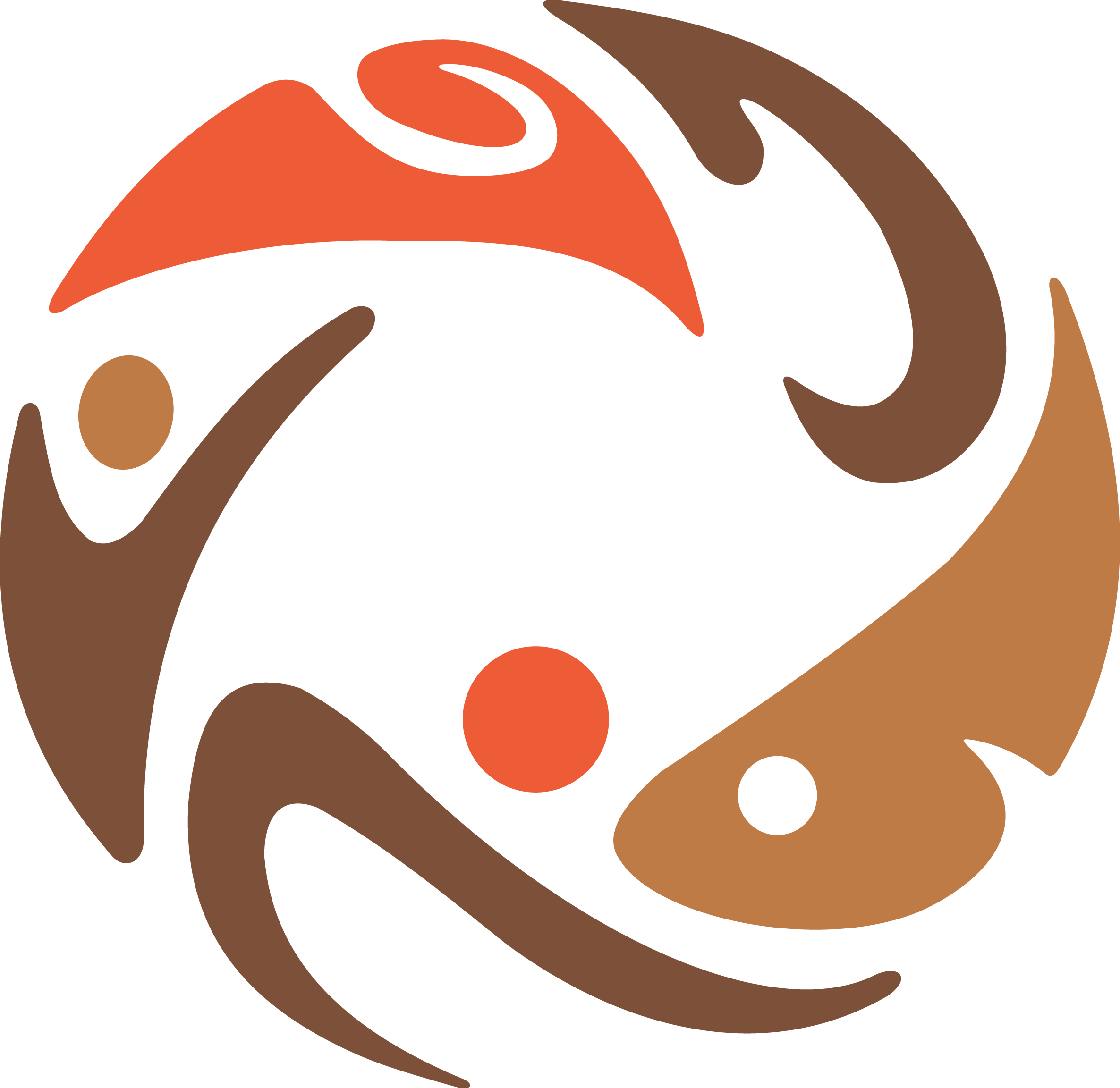
Former emblem of Pekalongan City used from 2014, after negative response the logo was reverted in 2017.

== See also ==
- Pekalongan Regency
