= Batang, Batang =

Batang
- Town
- Location within Java
- Coordinates: 6.908141°S 109.730369°E
- Country: Indonesia
- Province: Central Java
- Regency: Batang Regency

Area
  - Total: 39.39 km^{2} (15.21 sq mi)

Population (mid 2024 estimate)
  - Total: 139,492
  - Density: 3,541/km^{2} (9,172/sq mi)

Demographics
  - Ethnic groups: Javanese; Chinese
- Time zone: UTC+7 (Indonesia Western Standard Time)
- Languages: Indonesian; Javanese

The town of Batang is the administrative capital of Batang Regency, Indonesia. It is a coastal town, situated immediately to the east of the large city of Pekalongan. The town itself forms an administrative district (kecamatan) within that regency, and covers an area of 39.39 km^{2}. It had a population of 118,539 at the 2010 Census; the latest official estimate (as at mid 2024) is 139,492.

The district comprises nine urban villages or kelurahan (Karangasem Selatan, Karangasem Utara, Kasepuhan, Kauman, Proyonanggan Selatan, Proyonanggan Tengah, Proyonanggan Utara, Sambong and Watesalit) and twelve rural villages or desa (Cepokokuning, Denasri Wetan, Denasri Kulon, Kalipucang Kulon, Kalipucang Wetan, Kalisalak, Karanganyar, Kecepak, Klidang Lor, Klidang Wetan, Pasekaran and Rowobelang) - all sharing the postcodes 51211 - 51219.
