= Batang Regency =

Regency in Central Java, Indonesia

Batang Regency Kabupaten Batang
- Regency
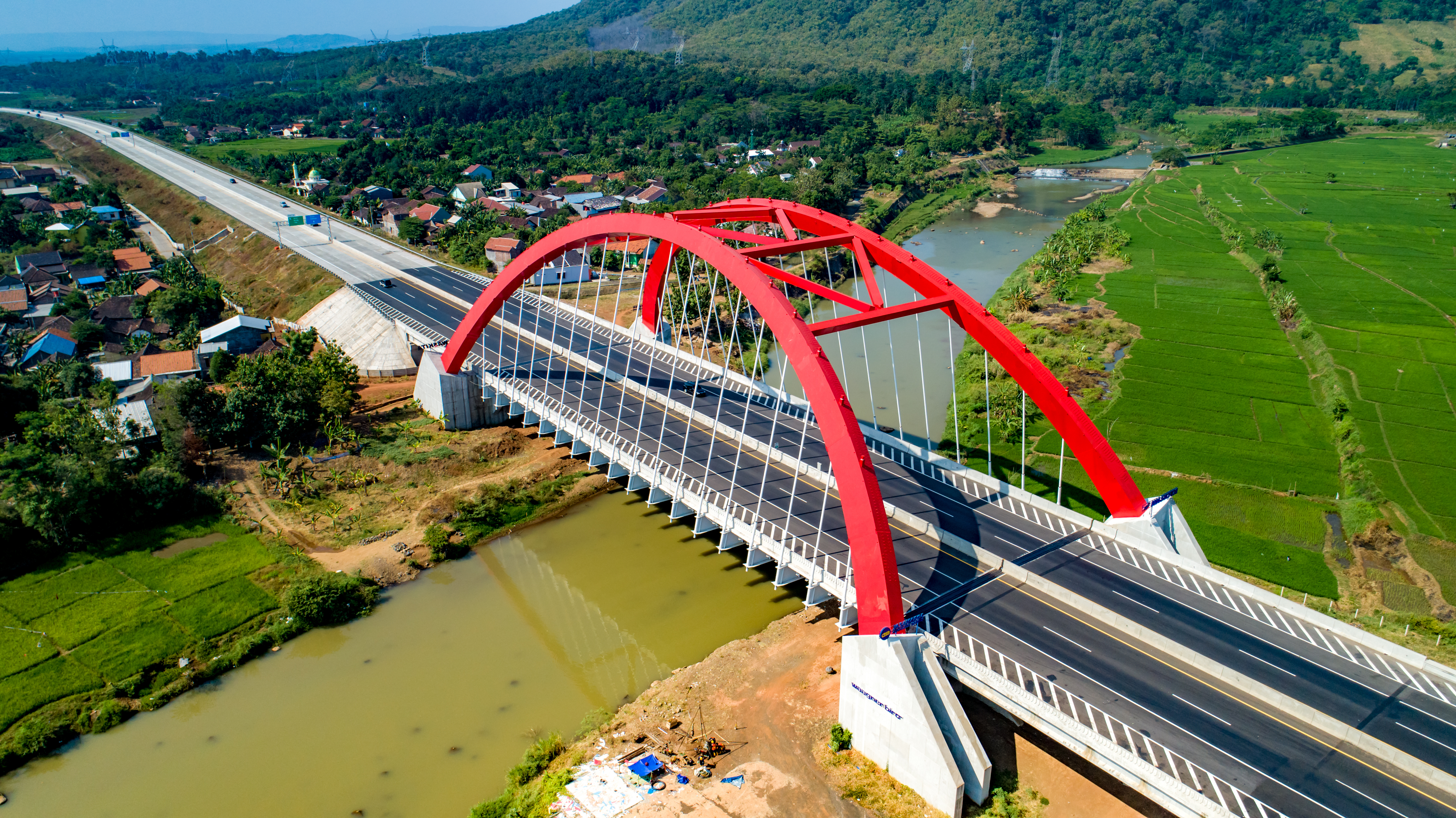
- Kalikuto bridge

- Coat of arms
- Motto: Batang Berkembang
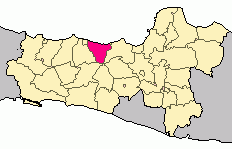
- Location within Central Java

- Location of Batang Regency in Indonesia
- Coordinates: 6°51′46″S 110°3′6″E
- Country: Indonesia
- Province: Central Java
- Capital: Batang

Government
  - Regent: Faiz Kurniawan
  - Vice Regent: Suyono

Area
  - Total: 857.21 km^{2} (330.97 sq mi)

Population (mid 2025 estimate)
  - Total: 847,175
  - Density: 988.29/km^{2} (2,559.7/sq mi)
- Time zone: UTC+7 (WIB)
- Area code: +62 285
- Website: batangkab.go.id

Batang (Javanese: ꦧꦠꦁ) is a regency (Indonesian: kabupaten) on the north coast of Central Java province in Indonesia. It was created on 14 June 1965 from what was previously the eastern half of Pekalongan Regency. It covers an area of 857.21 km^{2} and had a population of 706,764 at the 2010 Census and 801,718 at the 2020 Census; the official estimate as of mid-2025 was 847,175 (comprising 426,493 males and 420,682 females). Its capital is the town of Batang, situated about 100 km west of the province's capital city of Semarang but in effect an eastern suburb of Pekalongan city, whose city centre is just 8 km to the west.

People in Batang are mostly Javanese who speak both Javanese and Indonesian.

The regency comprises both coastal and mountainous landscapes. Batang's town centre is located on the side of the north coast trans-Java highway network, widely known as "the Pantura". Economic activities are concentrated along this highway and also in the vicinity of the town square known as "alun-alun". In the middle of the square, there is a huge old ficus tree which has become one of the Regency's icons.

== Administrative districts ==
Batang Regency comprises fifteen districts (kecamatan), tabulated below with their areas and their populations at the 2010 Census and the 2020 Census, together with the official estimates as of mid-2025. The table also includes the locations of the district headquarters, the number of administrative villages in each district (totaling 239 rural desa and 9 urban kelurahan - the latter all in Batang (town) District), and its postcode.

Kode Wilayah	Name of District (kecamatan)	Area in km^{2}	Pop'n Census 2010	Pop'n Census 2020	Pop'n Estimate mid 2025	Admin centre	No. of villages	Post code
33.25.01	Wonotunggal	55.43	30,915	37,797	41,401	Wonotunggal	15	51253
33.25.02	Bandar	79.37	63,310	71,691	75,666	Bandar	17	51254
33.25.03	Blado	96.45	42,131	45,835	47,448	Blado	18	51255
33.25.04	Reban	69.47	35,353	40,306	42,681	Reban	19	51273
33.25.05	Bawang	76.97	50,705	55,672	57,888	Bawang	20	51274
33.25.06	Tersono	51.36	35,585	40,482	42,822	Tersono	20	51272
33.25.07	Gringsing	79.74	55,859	63,019	66,394	Plelen	15	51291
33.25.08	Limpung	32.72	38,683	43,887	45,363	Limpung	17	51271
33.25.15	Banyuputih	42.33	32,781	36,708	38,535	Sembung	11	51271: 51281
33.25.09	Subah	91.43	48,518	53,186	55,260	Subah	17	51263
33.25.14	Pecalungan	44.05	29,959	32,519	33,626	Pecalungan	10	51262
33.25.10	Tulis	33.42	33,425	38,785	41,422	Kaliboyo	17	51254: 51263
33.25.13	Kandeman	40.64	45,305	54,602	59,394	Kandeman	13	51261
33.25.11	Batang (town)	39.39	118,539	133,738	140,904	Watesalit	21 ^{(a)}	51211: 51116
33.25.12	Warungasem	24.45	45,696	53,491	57,371	Banjiran	18	51252
	Totals	857.21	706,764	801,718	847,175	Batang	248	

Note: (a) comprises nine urban kelurahan (Karangasem Selatan, Karangasem Utara, Kasepuhan, Kauman, Proyonanggan Selatan, Proyonanggan Tengah, Proyonanggan Utara, Sambong and Watesalit) and twelve rural desa.

== Attractions ==
These include:

- Curug Genting 40m waterfall surrounded by pine forest, about 38 km southward (Blado District).
- Ujungnegoro Coast, 4 km northeastward, coast with steep edge, very rare in North Java. Aswotomo cave and small graveyard established by the Muslim missionary Syeikh Maulana Maghribi. Canoes can be hired and there is fishing.
- Curug Gombong: 13 m waterfall that divides naturally layered stones (raj stones), situated in Gombong village, about 6 km south of Subah District.
- Agrotourism: Pagilaran tea plantation in Andongsili hill and others, about 40 km to the mountain. There is a "tea walk" and tea products are on sale. Accommodation is available.
- Batang Beach: About 3 km from town northward. Watch the sunrise and take a look at fishermen's lives.

== Special events ==
Every "Jumat Kliwon" night (the night before a particular Friday, which coincides with the mystical fifth day of Kliwon of the Javanese calendar) people gather in the town square, creating a monthly festival with hundreds of street vendors selling goods. It occurs every 35 days.

== People related to Batang Regency ==
Goenawan Mohamad - democracy activist, writer and also prominent national press figure, was born in Batang.
