= List of Central Java regencies and cities =

The Indonesian province of Central Java comprises the following 29 regencies (kabupaten) and 6 cities (kota, previously kotamadya and kota pradja).

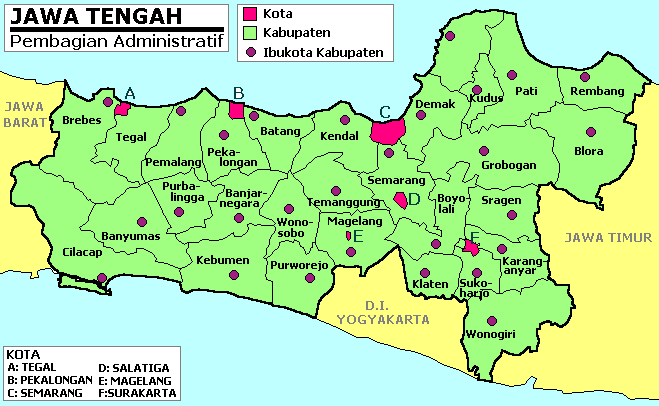
Central Java province, Indonesia.

Code		Coat of arms	Name			Capital	Area (km^{2})	Population (end 2024)	Level 3	Level 4		Location map
# 33.	SNI	Coat of arms	English	Bahasa Indonesia	Javanese (Hanacaraka)	Capital	Area (km^{2})	Population (end 2024)	Dis.	UV	RV	Location map
01	CLP	pus	Cilacap Regency	Kabupaten Cilacap	ꦕꦶꦭꦕꦥ꧀	Cilacap	2,323.93	2,059,748	24	15	269	
02	PWT	pus	Banyumas Regency	Kabupaten Banyumas	ꦧꦚꦸꦩꦱ꧀	Purwokerto	1,391.15	1,868,446	27	30	301	
03	PBG	pus	Purbalingga Regency	Kabupaten Purbalingga	ꦥꦸꦂꦧꦭꦶꦁꦒ	Purbalingga	805.76	1,057,750	18	15	224	
04	BNR	pus	Banjarnegara Regency	Kabupaten Banjarnegara	ꦧꦚ꧀ꦗꦂꦤꦼꦒꦫ	Banjarnegara	1,144.90	1,071,977	20	12	266	
05	KBM	pus	Kebumen Regency	Kabupaten Kebumen	ꦏꦼꦧꦸꦩꦺꦤ꧀	Kebumen	1,334.10	1,446,833	26	11	449	
06	PWR	pus	Purworejo Regency	Kabupaten Purworejo	ꦥꦸꦂꦮꦉꦗ	Purworejo	1,081.97	809,651	16	25	469	
07	WSB	pus	Wonosobo Regency	Kabupaten Wonosobo	ꦮꦤꦱꦧ	Wonosobo	1,011.62	945,955	15	29	236	
08	MKD	pus	Magelang Regency	Kabupaten Magelang	ꦩꦒꦼꦭꦁ	Mungkid	1,129.98	1,345,662	21	5	367	
09	BYL	pus	Boyolali Regency	Kabupaten Boyolali	ꦧꦺꦴꦪꦭꦭꦶ	Boyolali	1,096.59	1,114,070	22	6	261	
10	KLN	pus	Klaten Regency	Kabupaten Klaten	ꦏ꧀ꦭꦛꦺꦤ꧀	Klaten	701.50	1,302,648	26	10	391	
11	SKH	pus	Sukoharjo Regency	Kabupaten Sukoharjo	ꦱꦸꦏꦲꦂꦗ	Sukoharjo	493.53	916,472	12	17	150	
12	WNG	pus	Wonogiri Regency	Kabupaten Wonogiri	ꦮꦤꦒꦶꦫꦶ	Wonogiri	1,905.75	1,057,495	25	43	251	
13	KRG	pus	Karanganyar Regency	Kabupaten Karanganyar	ꦏꦫꦔꦚꦂ	Karanganyar	803.05	953,696	17	15	162	
14	SGN	pus	Sragen Regency	Kabupaten Sragen	ꦯꦿꦒꦺꦤ꧀	Sragen	994.57	1,023,538	20	12	196	
15	PWD	pus	Grobogan Regency	Kabupaten Grobogan	ꦒꦿꦺꦴꦧꦺꦴꦒꦤ꧀	Purwodadi	2,023.85	1,520,974	19	7	273	
16	BLA	pus	Blora Regency	Kabupaten Blora	ꦨ꧀ꦭꦺꦴꦫ	Blora	1,957.29	927,961	16	24	271	
17	RBG	pus	Rembang Regency	Kabupaten Rembang	ꦉꦩ꧀ꦧꦁ	Rembang	1,037.54	665,501	14	7	287	
18	PTI	pus	Pati Regency	Kabupaten Pati	ꦥꦛꦶ	Pati	1,572.90	1,385,904	21	5	401	
19	KDS	pus	Kudus Regency	Kabupaten Kudus	ꦏꦸꦢꦸꦱ꧀	Kudus	447.45	877,821	9	9	123	
20	JPA	pus	Jepara Regency	Kabupaten Jepara	ꦗꦼꦥꦫ	Jepara	1,020.25	1,283,687	16	11	184	
21	DMK	pus	Demak Regency	Kabupaten Demak	ꦢꦼꦩꦏ꧀	Demak	977.77	1,254,204	14	6	243	
22	UNR	pus	Semarang Regency	Kabupaten Semarang	ꦱꦼꦩꦫꦁ	Ungaran	1,019.27	1,088,729	19	27	208	
23	TMG	pus	Temanggung Regency	Kabupaten Temanggung	ꦠꦼꦩꦔ꧀ꦒꦸꦁ	Temanggung	864.83	822,880	20	23	266	
24	KDL	pus	Kendal Regency	Kabupaten Kendal	ꦏꦼꦟ꧀ꦝꦭ꧀	Kendal	1,008.12	1,094,214	20	20	266	
25	BTG	pus	Batang Regency	Kabupaten Batang	ꦨꦠꦁ	Batang	857.27	855,878	15	9	239	
26	KJN	pus	Pekalongan Regency	Kabupaten Pekalongan	ꦥꦏꦭꦺꦴꦔꦤ꧀	Kajen	892.91	1,034,241	19	13	272	
27	PML	pus	Pemalang Regency	Kabupaten Pemalang	ꦥꦼꦩꦭꦁ	Pemalang	1.137.41	1,601,007	14	12	212	
28	SLW	pus	Tegal Regency	Kabupaten Tegal	ꦠꦼꦒꦭ꧀	Slawi	983.90	1,745,278	18	6	281	
29	BBS	pus	Brebes Regency	Kabupaten Brebes	ꦧꦽꦧꦼꦱ꧀	Brebes	1,742.81	2,066,426	17	5	292	
71	MGG	pus	Magelang City	Kota Magelang	ꦩꦒꦼꦭꦁ	—N/a	18.56	128,709	3	17	—N/a	
72	SKT	pus	Surakarta City	Kota Surakarta	ꦯꦸꦫꦏꦂꦡ	—N/a	46.72	589,242	5	51	—N/a	
73	SLT	pus	Salatiga City	Kota Salatiga	ꦯꦭꦠꦶꦒ	—N/a	54.98	198,971	4	23	—N/a	
74	SMG	pus	Semarang City	Kota Semarang	ꦯꦼꦩꦫꦁ	—N/a	370.00	1,702,379	16	177	—N/a	
75	PKL	pus	Pekalongan City	Kota Pekalongan	ꦥꦏꦭꦺꦴꦔꦤ꧀	—N/a	46.20	318,221	4	27	—N/a	
76	TGL	pus	Tegal City	Kota Tegal	ꦠꦼꦒꦭ꧀	—N/a	39.08	294,477	4	27	—N/a	

== See also ==
- Central Java
