= 2024 Pati regency election =

- 27 November 2024
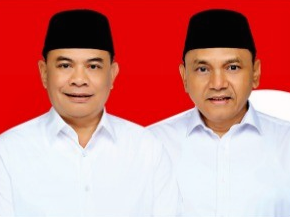

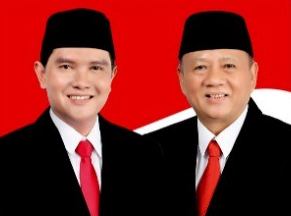
Candidate	Sudewo	Wahyu Indriyanto
Party	Gerindra	PDI-P
Running mate	Risma Ardhi Chandra	Suharyono
Popular vote	419,684	335,318
Percentage	53.53%	42.77%
- Results by district and subdistrict
Regent before election
Sujarwanto Dwiatmoko
Independent
Elected Regent
Sudewo
Gerindra

The 2024 Pati regency election was held on 27 November 2024 as part of nationwide local elections to elect the regent of Pati Regency, Central Java for a five-year term. Gerindra's candidate and House of Representatives member Sudewo defeated PDI-P candidate Wahyu Indriyanto in the election, along with PAN candidate former vice regent Budiyono.

== Electoral system ==
The election, like other local elections in 2024, follow the first-past-the-post system where the candidate with the most votes wins the election, even if they do not win a majority. It is possible for a candidate to run uncontested, in which case the candidate is still required to win a majority of votes "against" an "empty box" option. Should the candidate fail to do so, the election will be repeated on a later date.

== Candidates ==
According to electoral regulations, candidates were required to secure the support of a political party or a coalition of parties which collectively won at least 6.5 percent of votes in the 2024 legislative election. Candidates may alternatively register without party endorsement by submitting photocopies of identity cards. In the case of Pati, no independent candidates registered to run. The previously elected regent, Haryanto, had served two full terms and was ineligible to run in the election.

Sudewo, a member of the House of Representatives (DPR) from the Gerindra Party who has served since 2009, contested the election. He ran with Risma Ardhi Chandra, a National Awakening Party (PKB) member and IT entrepreneur. The candidates were endorsed by a coalition of eight parties, including Gerindra, PKB, Golkar, Nasdem, and four other parties with no seats in Pati's Regional House of Representatives (DPRD).

The Indonesian Democratic Party of Struggle (PDI-P) put forward Wahyu Indriyanto, a local construction businessman and party member, as their candidate in the election. His running mate Suharyono is a retired civil servant who had served as regional secretary under former regent Haryanto. The Indriyanto–Suharyono ticket was endorsed by PDI-P, Demokrat, and PKS. also received the public endorsement of Haryanto.

The third candidate, Budiyono, was Haryanto's vice-regent from 2012 to 2017, and the chairman of the local branch of the National Mandate Party (PAN). He had previously failed to win a DPR seat in the 2024 election. His running mate, Novi Eko Yulianto, is a village head at Jakenan in Pati. The pair was endorsed by PAN and the United Development Party.

== Campaign ==
PDI-P has historically been the largest party in Pati's DPRD and dominated the local legislative elections, but had last placed a member as Pati's regent in the 2006–2011 term before Haryanto became regent and was elected twice. A major issue in the campaign was spreading out industrial development within Pati – the regency has seen manufacturing increase from 12 percent to 28 percent of GRDP between 2003 and 2023, but only in some districts.

Two rounds of public debates between the candidates were organized by the General Elections Commission (KPU), held on 30 October and 13 November 2024.

== Results ==
Candidate	Running mate	Candidate party	Votes	%
Sudewo	Risma Ardhi Chandra	Gerindra	419,684	53.53
Wahyu Indriyanto	Suharyono	PDI-P	335,318	42.77
Budiyono	Novi Eko Yulianto	PAN	28,946	3.69
Total			783,948	100.00
Valid votes			783,948	96.29
Invalid/blank votes			30,200	3.71
Total votes			814,148	100.00
Registered voters/turnout			1,036,887	78.52

Sudewo and Chandra were sworn in as regent and vice regent on 20 February 2025.
