= Amat Antono =

Indonesian politician (born 1958)

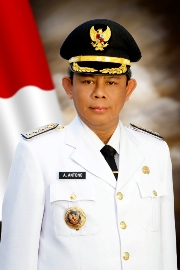

Regent of Pekalongan
- In office 26 June 2011 – 26 June 2016
- Preceded by: Siti Qomariyah
- Succeeded by: Asip Kholbihi
- In office 2001–2006
- Preceded by: Harsono
- Succeeded by: Siti Qomariyah

Personal details
- Born: 5 October 1958 (age 67) Pekalongan, Central Java, Indonesia

Amat Antono (born 5 October 1958) is an Indonesian politician who served as the regent of Pekalongan Regency, Central Java for two terms, 2001–2006 and 2011–2016. Initially elected as regent of his home regency through a legislative vote, he lost in its first direct election to his deputy Siti Qomariyah before defeating her in 2011.

== Background ==
Amat Antono was born in Tegaldowo village, Tirto subdistrict, Pekalongan Regency on 5 October 1958. He graduated from Diponegoro University with a bachelor's degree in 1984, and later a master's degree in 2006. His wife Arini Harimurti was elected as vice regent in the 2016 local election. The couple has two children.

== Career ==
Before entering politics, Antono was a bureaucrat, working in the transmigration body at West Kalimantan's Sambas Regency. In 2001, he ran as a regent for his home regency with local academician Siti Qomariyah as his running mate, and the pair was voted 27-18 into office following a heated two-stage vote at the regency's legislative council. In 2006, he ran for reelection against Qomariyah in Pekalongan's first direct regency election. Although he received the support of a coalition of 15 political parties including his party PDI-P, he would lose to Qomariyah, winning 207,705 votes to Qomariyah's 227,137.

Between his terms, he served in several offices, including head of an inter-regency coordination body, briefly as the acting regent of Tegal Regency, and as a special staff to the governor. He ran once more in 2011 and this time won 254,762 votes (54.75%), defeating Qomariyah following a campaign which strongly focused on infrastructure development programs.

During his second term, he released a legislation prohibiting the hunting of snakes. His second term expired on 27 June 2016, as he could not run for reelection due to term limits.

In the 2019 legislative election, Antono ran as a NasDem Party candidate for the People's Representative Council from Central Java's 10th electoral district.
