= 2025 Pati demonstrations =

Anti-government demonstration in Indonesia

- "Revolusi Dimulai dari Pati" Part of the 2025 Indonesian protests
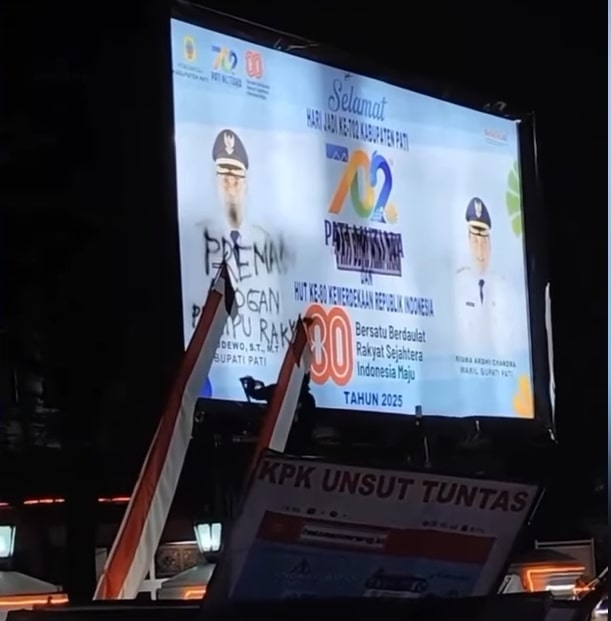
- Defaced banner of Sudewo with the text: "Arrogant Thug, Deceiver of the People."
- Date: 10‒13 August 2025
- Location: Pati Regency, Central Java, Indonesia
- Caused by: Proposed 250% increase in land and building tax (PBB-P2); Unpopular policies of Regent Sudewo
- Goals: Cancellation of PBB-P2 tax hike; Resignation of Regent Sudewo; Rejection of five-day school policy; Halt to Alun-Alun renovation and mosque demolition; Cancellation of jumbotron project; Rehiring of dismissed hospital staff
- Methods: Demonstrations, riots
- Status: Protest dispersed; tax hike cancelled; DPRD Pati launched right to inquiry against the regent
- Result: Tax hike cancelled: DPRD Pati formed special committee to investigate regent

Parties
| United Pati Society Alliance | Pati Regency Government; Indonesian National Police; Indonesian Army; Municipal Police |

Lead figures
| Local protest leaders Supriyono "Zoro"; Ahmad "Luffy" Hussein | (Indonesia) Government; Regent Sudewo; Police Chief Kombes Jaka Wahyudi; Lt. Col. Timotius Berlian Yogi Ananto |

Number
| 85,000‒100,000 | 2,684 security personnel |

Casualties and losses
| 64 injured, 22 detained | 12 injured |

The 2025 Pati demonstrations were a series of mass protests first held on 10 August 2025 in Pati Regency, Central Java, Indonesia, against Regent Sudewo's leadership. Initially triggered by public anger over a proposed 250% increase in the rural and urban land and building tax (Indonesian: Pajak Bumi dan Bangunan Perdesaan dan Perkotaan, PBB-P2), the protest escalated into broader demands for Sudewo's resignation and the reversal of other unpopular local policies. The demonstration drew over 100,000 people, marking the demonstration as the largest in the regency's history.

Organized by the United Pati Society Alliance (Aliansi Masyarakat Pati Bersatu), the rally drew tens of thousands of participants to Pati's Alun-Alun (town square) and the Pendopo Kabupaten Pati. The protest turned violent when the regent refused to meet the crowd, leading to clashes in which police deployed water cannons and tear gas, and protesters burned a police vehicle. In response, the Pati Regional People's Representative Council (DPRD Pati) unanimously invoked its hak angket (right of inquiry) to investigate the regent's conduct, marking the beginning of a potential local impeachment process.

== Background ==
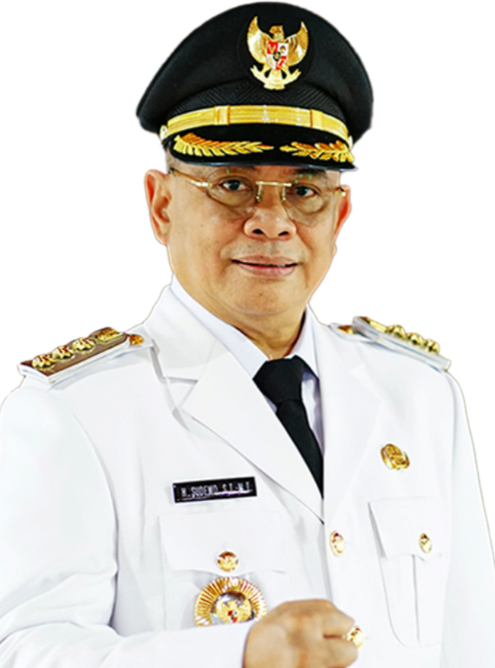
Pati Regent, Sudewo

The protest was sparked by a controversial local tax policy and perceived arrogance from the regent (local chief executive). In mid-2025, Regent Sudewo announced a plan to raise the Rural and Urban Land and Building Tax (Pajak Bumi dan Bangunan Perdesaan dan Perkotaan, or PBB-P2) by up to 250%, the first increase in 14 years. Local authorities argued this was a maximum cap and that many properties would see smaller hikes (some only 50%). However, residents feared the sharp tax rise would burden the community and protested that the policy was decided without sufficient public input.

Tensions escalated when Regent Sudewo responded to early criticism by challenging citizens to protest, saying he would even allow 5,000 or 50,000 people to demonstrate if they wished. This remark was widely viewed as provocative and insensitive, reinforcing perceptions of an arrogant leadership. In defiance, citizens organized through the newly formed United Pati Society Alliance and began collecting donations of protest supplies. Residents symbolically lined the sidewalks in front of the Pendopo (regency hall) with thousands of boxed bottled waters and other logistics, signaling that they were prepared to rally en masse. The movement quickly gained momentum on social media, drawing support both locally and from netizens across Indonesia. Figures who had once backed Sudewo switched sides and became a vocal critic of the regent, now leading the protest. Farmers from Desa Gunungsari (Tlogowungu, Pati) actively participated in the protest by donating logistical support, unloading 3 truckload of banana bunches as a form of solidarity with the United Pati Society Alliance.

Faced with the public outcry, Regent Sudewo attempted to defuse the situation in the days before the planned demonstration: he issued a public apology and rescinded the 250% tax hike plan. On the regency government's official social media, Sudewo clarified that he “never meant to challenge” his own people and expressed regret for his words, pleading, "I apologize... I did not intend to challenge my rakyat". Despite this about-face on the tax policy, anger in the community had reached a boiling point. Citizens decided to proceed with a large-scale demonstration, expanding their demands beyond just the tax issue to a broader indictment of Sudewo's leadership.

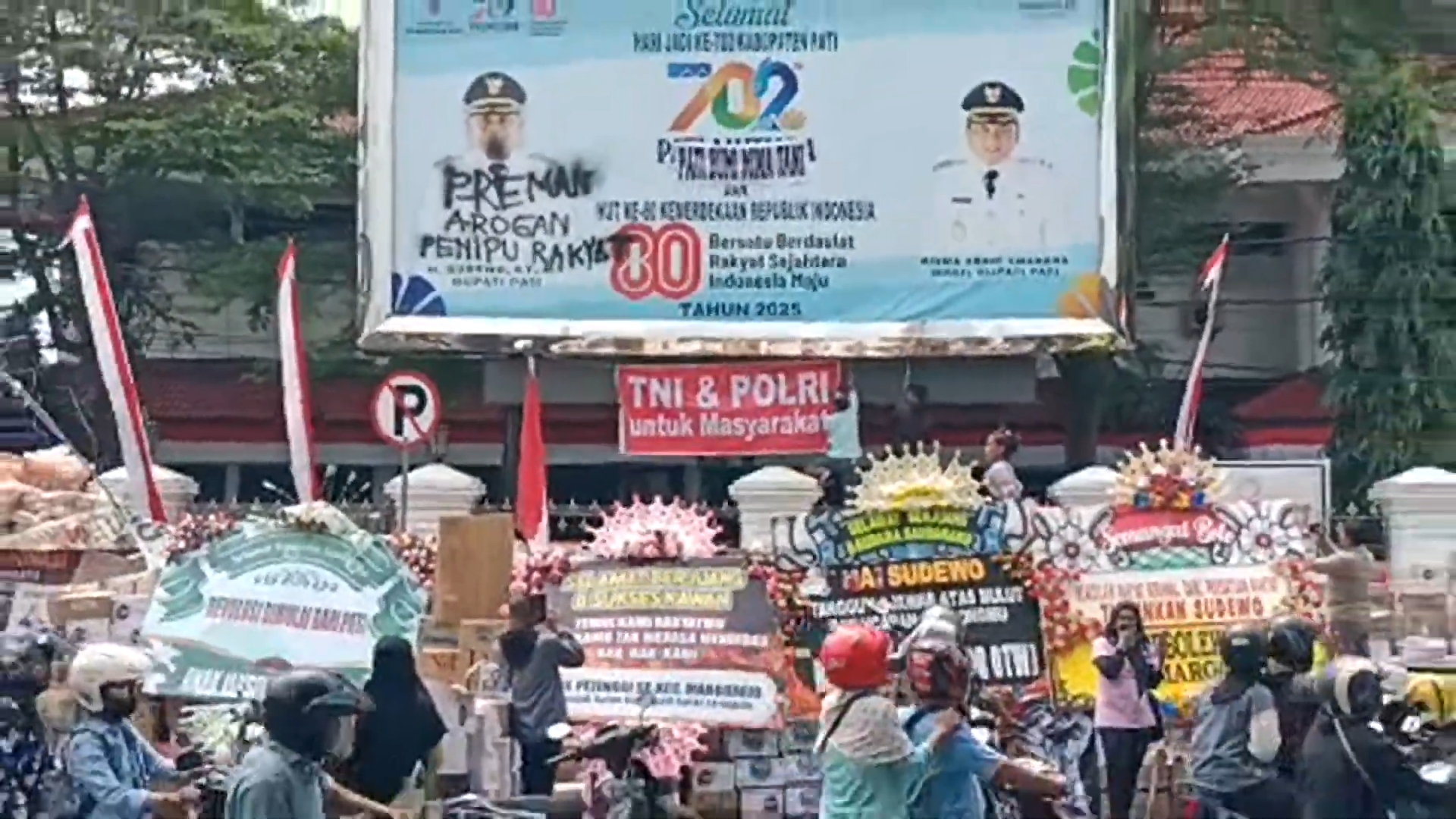
Government personnel putting up a banner of support. Sarcastic congratulatory decorative signs are seen below. 12 August 2025

Additional grievances also fed into the protest agenda. Many residents saw the tax controversy as one symptom of what they called anti-people policies by the regent. Protest organizers listed five major demands:

1. That Sudewo resign as regent;
2. Rejection of a planned “five-day school week” policy for students;
3. Cancellation of a costly Rp2 billion renovation of the town square (Alun-Alun Pati);
4. Opposition to the demolition of a historic mosque on the Alun-Alun; and
5. Scrutiny of a Rp1.39 billion videotron project seen as wasteful.

Issues from education scheduling to preservation of local heritage had been brewing concerns in Pati. The regent's contentious tax hike and remarks effectively became a catalyst that united various groups (students, religious communities, market traders, and even former government employees) under a common protest banner. For example, hundreds of ex-staff of the Soewondo Regional Hospital who had been laid off also joined the cause, demanding their jobs back and calling out Sudewo's governance. On 11‒12 August, in anticipation for the protest the several village heads within the Pati advised stores to close down along the protest timeframe.

== Timeline ==
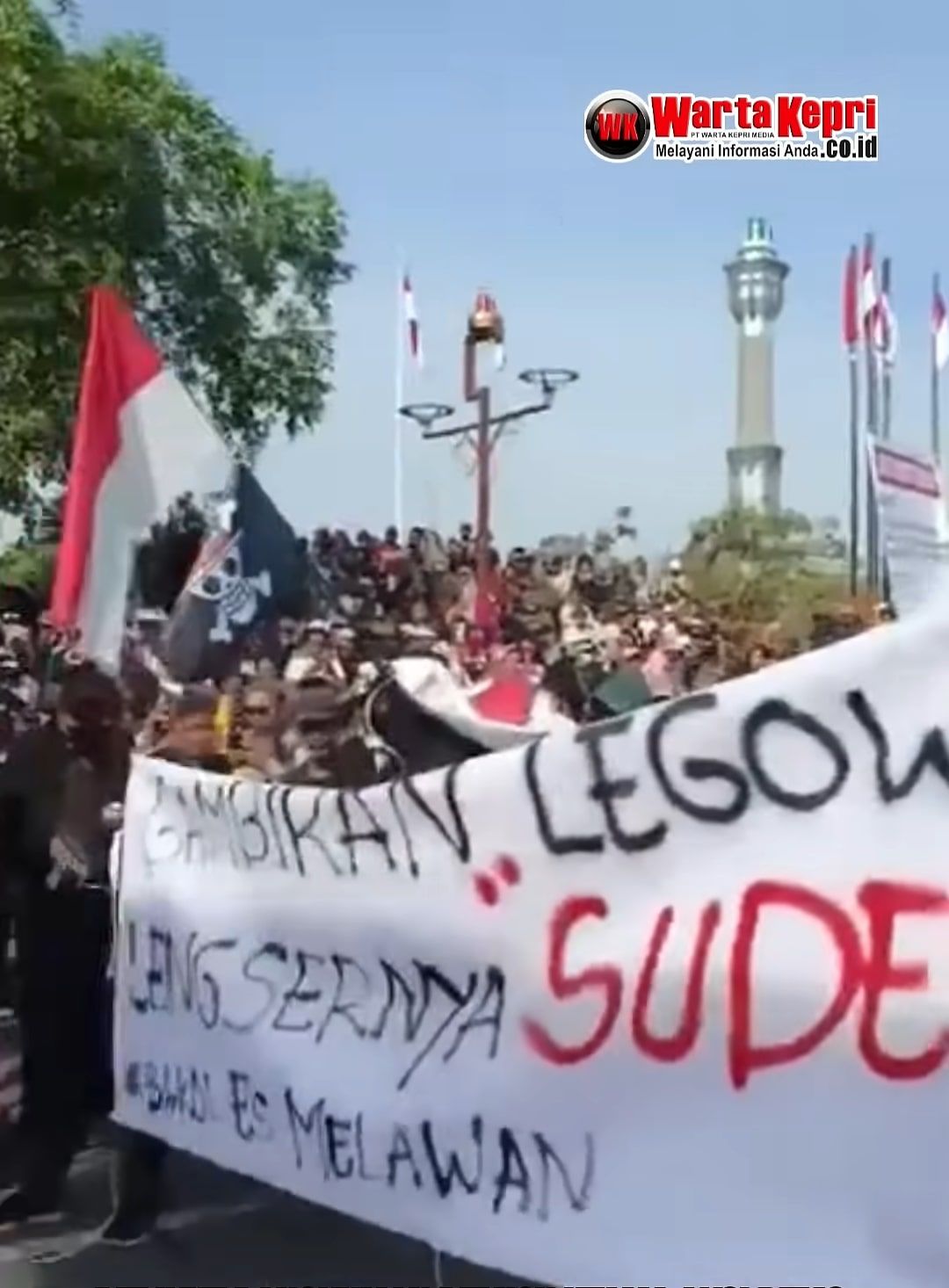
Pati Protest banner calling for the "toppling of Sugowo." The Straw Hat Pirates' Jolly Roger can be seen in the background.

The planned "demonstration" took place on Wednesday, August 13, 2025, and quickly grew into one of the largest mass actions in Pati's history. Starting at 8:00 am, people began to converge at the Alun-Alun Pati (town square) and the adjacent Pendopo Kabupaten Pati (the regent's office pavilion). Many of the protesters were trucked from rural villages across the regency, moving to the city center before dawn. By mid-morning, the crowd carrying Indonesian flags, banners and shouting slogans filled the area in front of the Pendopo. Protesters chanted and held signs demanding Regent Sudewo step down ("Turunkan Bupati Sudewo"). Demonstration leaders took turns giving speeches via loudspeakers, emphasizing that the regent's "arrogant" behavior and unpopular policies could no longer be tolerated. They urged participants to remain disciplined and avoid anarchic acts, framing the protest as a show that "Pati's citizens are polite, peace-loving, and not arrogant." Local businesses and markets closed as traders, farmers, students, and civil society groups joined the rally, including the elderly and youth (Pemuda), heeding the alliance's call for a general mobilization.

Pati's police had coordinated reinforcements from surrounding districts, mobilizing 2,684 personnel (combined police, military, and public order officers) to safeguard the protest. Police Commander Kombes (Commissioner) Jaka Wahyudi, the Pati city police chief, personally stepped into the crowd alongside Lt. Col. Timotius Berlian Yogi Ananto, the local military (Kodim 0718) commander. In a public address through a megaphone, they assured the demonstrators that the authorities “stand with the people” and would facilitate the expression of aspirations. Police Chief Wahyudi announced that officers and TNI (army) troops would escort representatives of the protesters to convey their demands to the regional legislature (DPRD). These initial interactions between security officials and protesters were calm, even amicable as the crowd cheered when the officials said “Hidup rakyat!” (“Long live the people!”) and gave their thumbs-up. By late morning, estimates of the turnout ranged from 25,000 people swelled up to nearly 100,000 participants who had flooded Pati's city center, overwhelming security and government apparatus. As noon approached, tensions spiked over the key issue of Regent Sudewo's absence. The demonstrators’ primary demand was for Sudewo to come out and face the people. In the days prior, protest organizers had obtained a promise that the regent or a representative would meet them during the rally to hear their grievances. However, by midday, Sudewo still had not emerged from the Pendopo, which only aggravated the crowd.

According to on-site reports, around 11:20 WIB, the situation turned chaotic when the promised dialogue failed to materialize. Protest coordinators tried to reorganize efforts to defuse tensions but without progress. Demonstrators began hurling plastic water bottles, rocks, vegetables, and other debris toward the front of the Pendopo and at the lines of riot police guarding it. Some angry protesters tried to push down the front gate and surge into the Pendopo yard. At 11:23 WIB, Protestors were briefly started to dispurse from the Bupati office after police actions. In the midst of this, Regent Sudewo finally made an appearance, Sudewo arrived to the scene of the protest by a Brimob armored vehicle inside the compound around 12:17 WIB to address the crowd over loudspeaker. Flanked by aides holding up a riot shield to protect him, Sudewo publicly apologized to the protesters for his missteps, vowing that he will work to be better. This brief plea, however, did little to calm the situation. Many in the crowd booed and jeered the regent's words, interpreting them as too little, too late. Sudewo's presence further inflame some protesters. as soon as the regent finished speaking, protestors began to hurl plastic bottles, sandals, and blunt objects in the direction of the Pendopo and the regent's vehicle.

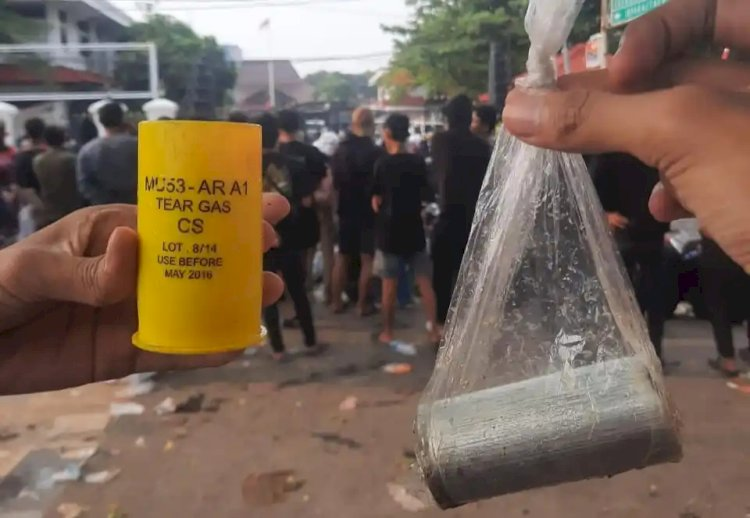
Expired tear gas canisters fired by the Pati Regency Police

Once violence broke out, security forces quickly moved to disperse the protesters by force. At first, officers deployed water cannon trucks, blasting high-pressure jets of water at those attempting to breach the Pendopo gates. When that failed to deter the most aggressive demonstrators, police resorted to firing tear gas canisters into the crowd. Smoke grenades were also used. Pushed back, protesters had to take to take shelter to a local mosque. Tempo reports that police would then deliberately fire tear gas towards the mosque to further dispurse the protestors. Police also shot tear gas towards ambulances leading medical workers to relocate farther west from the square. Approximately 40 individuals were rushed to the hospital after police deployed tear gas against demonstrators. The Jakarta Post describes that most of those treated suffered from breathing difficulties due to tear gas exposure. It also notes that two police officers were wounded in the chaos.

Demonstrators breaching the Pati DPRD

By about midday, the main assembly in front of the Pendopo had been scattered off the Alun-Alun area due to the heavy tear gas and water cannon use. Splinter groups of protesters regrouped in nearby streets. Notably on the west side of the complex, near a church behind the Pendopo on Jalan Dr Wahidin. There, segments of the crowd attacked a police vehicle, overturning a police car belonging to a neighboring district unit trapped and abandoned during the breakdown in chaos, and was set on fire. In response, officers fired a second volley of tear gas to break up the group and prevent further property destruction. Pockets of protesters lingered on the outskirts of the city center (in areas unaffected by tear gas) until after 12:30 WIB, where protestors managed to regroup.

By 15:30 WIB, most storefronts including minimarkets, eyeglass shops, computer stores, and clothing outlets remained shut. The streets near the square were notably empty. The United Pati Society Alliance soon announced that they would open again their commando post at DPRD Pati building, at the night of 18 August. They have also planned for the second wave of protest next week on 25 August, while leader Ahmad Husein called participants to maintain orderliness. However, this plan was later withdrawn by himself and then supported Sudewo's rule. The director of Semarang Legal Aid Institute, Ahmad Syamsuddin Arief, alleged that there are attempts to thwart the second wave of protests.

On 25 August, protesters from United Pati Society Alliance, without Ahmad Husein, walked from the Pati regent office to the Pos Indonesia branch in Pati, located 1.5 kilometer away. They did so in order to send a letter calling for the arrest of Sudewo by the Corruption Eradication Commission (KPK).

== Reactions ==
The founder of Ummah Party, Amien Rais, supported the protesters and called Sudewo to resign as soon as possible. He also called president Prabowo Subianto to take actions against Sudewo over his policies.

== Aftermath ==
Pati DPRD forming a special committee for the right of inquiry, present with members of the demonstrators

Following the protests, Sudewo was called upon by the Corruption Eradication Commission (KPK) over his involvement in a bribery case relating to railway construction and maintenance, occurred between 2022 and 2024. All the bribes have been returned by him, but the investigation on this case still ongoing. Sudewo also received warnings from high-ranking officials of his own Gerindra Party, such as chairman Prabowo Subianto and his deputy Budi Djiwandono.

In Bone Regency, another protest against the 300% hike of land and building tax, was held on 19 August at front of Bone regent office.

On the 7th day after the protests that began on 13 August, residents of Pati staged an impromptu candle-lighting ceremony called "Aksi 1000 Lilin" (lit. 1000 candles action) at the Pati Alun-Alun. Participants placed lit candles around the square since 7 PM as a peaceful gesture and a form of public remembrance. Local sources report that the event was a spontaneous initiative by Pati locals.

The impeachment of Sudewo failed to pass the local legislature on 1 November 2025, although Sudewo would ultimately be removed from his post following his arrest by KPK for a bribery case on 19 January 2026. The protestors would hold a public thanksgiving following Sudewo's arrest.

== See also ==
- 2025 Indonesian protests
  - 2025 Jakarta Fairmont Hotel occupation
  - August 2025 Indonesian protests
- 2026 East Kalimantan protests
