= Siti Qomariyah =

Indonesian academic and politician

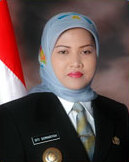

Regent of Pekalongan
- In office 26 June 2006 – 26 June 2011
- Preceded by: Amat Antono
- Succeeded by: Amat Antono

Vice Regent of Pekalongan
- In office 2001–2006
- Regent: Amat Antono
- Succeeded by: Wahyudi Pontjo Nugroho

Personal details
- Born: 8 July 1967 (age 59) Pekalongan, Central Java, Indonesia

Siti Qomariyah (born 8 July 1967) is an Indonesian academic and politician who served as the regent of Pekalongan, Central Java between 2006 and 2011.

Born in Pekalongan into a family with strong santri and kyai connections, she started out as an academic before entering politics in 2001 as her home regency's vice-regent. She then became the first directly-elected regent of Pekalongan in 2006, but lost her reelection campaign in 2011.

== Background ==
Siti Qomariyah was born in Pekalongan on 8 July 1967, the eldest of nine children. Her father was a local kyai and pesantren caretaker in her home village and her mother taught at kindergartens. After completing junior high school at a Pekalongan madrasa, she resumed her education in a state-funded Madrasah Aliyah (senior high school equivalent) in Jombang, East Java. After completing high school, she studied at a state Islamic institute (Institut Agama Islam Negeri) in Pekalongan. Qomariyah continued her education later on, gaining a scholarship for a master's degree at McGill University in Canada and later continued for a PhD at Gadjah Mada University.

== Career ==
Prior to entering politics, Qomariyah lectured at a state-funded Islamic institute (Sekolah Tinggi Agama Islam Negeri) in Pekalongan since 1992.

=== 2001 and 2006 local election ===
In 2001, she ran as the running mate of PDI-P politician Amat Antono as regent and vice-regent of Pekalongan. While initially uninterested in politics, Qomariyah was invited to the position by the National Awakening Party (PKB). The election, which was an indirect vote by the regency's legislative council, required two phases to resolve as Antono/Qomariyah could not secure an initial majority. After a 27-18 vote, Qomariyah became the vice regent of Pekalongan.

She ran again in 2006, still with PKB and NU support, in Pekalongan's first direct regency election. This time she ran as the regent candidate, against Antono who ran for reelection. During the election, she was charged with a sexual scandal, with images allegedly depicting her with her running mate Pontjo Nugroho circulating online. She eventually won the election, receiving 227,137 votes while Antono received 207,705. Once she was elected and sworn in, demonstrations demanding her removal from office due to the images were held.

=== As regent ===
As regent, Qomariyah put significant attention into female representation and issues, although she did not include it in the regency's five-year plans, and women still suffered from less education and gender pay gap. She also initiated the construction of a new building for her alumni IAIN Pekalongan, which was completed in 2018.

She ran for reelection in the 2011 local election. In a four-way race that included herself, her deputy Pontjo Nugroho, Amat Antono, and Imam Djamhuri, she placed second, with 166,210 votes to Antono's 254,762. Following the end of her term, she resumed her lecturing at STAIN Pekalongan.
