= Sumenep Waterfall =

Waterfall in Indonesia

Sumenep Waterfall is a three-tiered waterfall in Jepara, located in the province of Central Java, Indonesia.

== Location ==
Sumenep Waterfall is located 7 km southward of the hall of Jepara Regency.

== Description ==
Sumenep Waterfall consists of three tiers:

- First tier Waterfall

At the bottom is a stone wall with three waterfalls.

- Second Tier Waterfall

The second tier, a 10-minute walk from the first, consists of a semicircular stone wall with three streams that spread across decorated hanging roots, moss, and green grass.

- Third Tier Waterfall

The top tier consists of two large streams and waterfalls.
