= Asip Kholbihi =

Indonesian politician (born 1966)

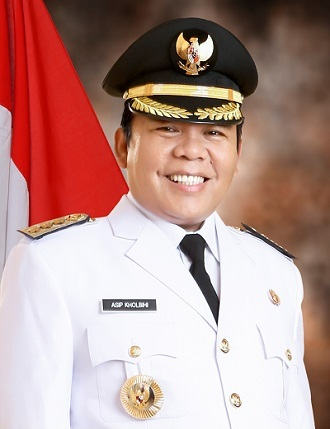

Regent of Pekalongan
- In office 27 June 2016 – 27 June 2021
- Preceded by: Amat Antono
- Succeeded by: Fadia A. Rafiq

Member of Central Java Provincial Council
- In office 2014–2016

Speaker of Pekalongan Regency Council
- In office 2004–2014

Member of Pekalongan Regency Council
- In office 2004–2014

Personal details
- Born: 1 February 1966 (age 59) Banjarnegara, Central Java, Indonesia

Asip Kholbihi (born 1 February 1966) is an Indonesian politician who served as regent of Pekalongan Regency, Central Java from 2016 to 2021. He was elected as regent in 2015.

== Biography ==
Asip Kholbihi was born in Banjarnegara on 1 February 1966. He had graduated from University of Pekalongan and later on getting a masters from Diponegoro University. Prior to becoming regent, he had served two terms in Pekalongan Regency Council as its speaker and was elected in 2014 to Central Java Provincial Council.

He participated in Pekalongan's 2015 local election with Ariani Antono, wife of the previous regent Amat Antono, as running mate. The couple won with 250,523 votes, and the Constitutional Court of Indonesia upheld their win following a lawsuit by their competitor. The pair was sworn in on 27 June 2016.

While regent, he visited Moscow to promote Pekalongan's batik crafts. During his term, the regency's government set up a 1,600-hectare industrial zone, centered on textiles. He also launched a program granting benefits to schoolchildren from low-income families.
