= Kedungwuni =

- District (kecamatan)
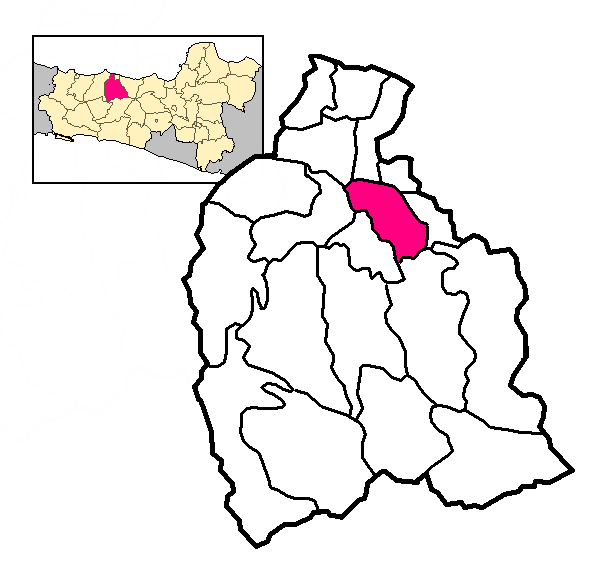
- Location of Kedungwuni District within Pekalongan Regency of Central Java
- Interactive map of Kedungwuni
- Country: Indonesia
- Province: Central Java
- Regency: Pekalongan
- Villages: 16 Rural Villages; 3 Urban Villages or towns

Area
  - Total: 23.06 km^{2} (8.90 sq mi)

Population (mid 2025 estimate)
  - Total: 105,057
  - Density: 4,556/km^{2} (11,800/sq mi)

Kedungwuni is an administrative district (kecamatan) and a town (kelurahan) in Pekalongan Regency in Central Java Province of Indonesia. It covers a land area of 23.06 km^{2}, and had a population of 90,774 at the 2010 Census and 100,796 at the 2020 Census; the official estimate as at mid 2025 was 105,057. It is sub-divided into 3 urban villages or towns (kelurahan) and 16 rural villages (desa), all sharing the postcode of 51173. The administrative headquarters for the district are in West Kedungwuni (Kedungwuni Barat) town.

== Towns (kelurahan) and villages (desa) ==
The district comprises 3 urban and 16 rural villages, tabled below with their populations as at mid 2023, with a combined district population of 104,094:

1. Rowocacing (2,206)
2. Langkap (3,358)
3. Pajomblangan (3,157)
4. Tosaran (2,685)
5. Pakisputih (4,548)
6. Kedungpatangewu (3,382)
7. Podo (5,417)
8. Kwayangan (4,076)
9. Proto (3,181)
10. Salakbrojo (4,438)
11. Ambokembang (8,498)
12. Pekajangan (9,275) - kelurahan
13. Tangkil Tengah (5,098)
14. Tangkil Kulon (5,499)
15. Karangdowo (3,606)
16. Bugangan (2,684)
17. Rengas (3,604)
18. Kedungwuni Barat (13,393) - kelurahan
19. Kedungwuni Timur (15,989) - kelurahan
