= Wonopringgo =

- Village and district
- Location in Java
- Coordinates: 6°59′28″S 109°38′24″E
- Country: Indonesia
- Province: Central Java
- Regency: Pekalongan Regency

Area
  - Total: 20.66 km^{2} (7.98 sq mi)

Population (mid 2025)
  - Total: 50,671
  - Density: 2,453/km^{2} (6,352/sq mi)

Wonopringgo (Indonesian pronunciation: [wɔnɔˈpriŋɡɔ]) is a village (desa) and an administrative district (kecamatan) in Pekalongan Regency in Central Java Province of Indonesia. It is located south of Pekalongan. The village was an important centre of sugar production with the Karang Anjer Factory in the area during the Dutch East Indies from at least the 1830s when the first Chinese person ran the factory in Wonopringgo. The Amsterdam based Netherlands Trading Company (Nederlandsche Handelmaatschappij or NHM) operated in the village.

== Administrative divisions ==
The district contains the following 14 villages (desa), listed with their populations according to the official estimates for mid 2023:

- Jetakkidul (4,298)
- Sastrodirjan (4,234)
- Legokgunung (3,632)
- Galangpengampon (4,973)
- Kwagean (4,122)
- Getas (2,973)
- Rowokembu (5,294)
- Wonopringgo (2,953)
- Sampih (1,696)
- Gondang (5,008)
- Wonorejo (2,206)
- Jetaklengkong (2,092)
- Pegadentengah (3,952)
- Surabayan (2,745)
