= Sudewo =

Indonesian politician (born 1968)

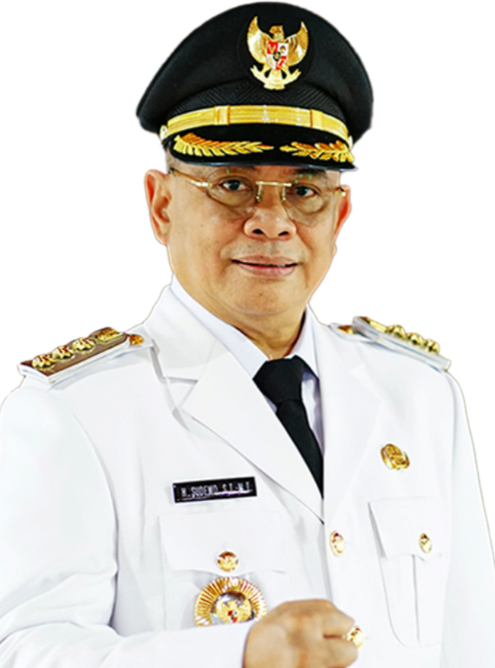
- Official portrait, 2025

Regent of Pati
- In office 20 February 2025 – 19 January 2026
- Governor: Ahmad Luthfi
- Deputy: Risma Ardhi Chandra
- Preceded by: Haryanto

Member of the House of Representatives
- In office 1 October 2019 – 1 October 2024
- Constituency: Central Java III
- Majority: 52,095 (2019); 44,333 (2024)
- In office 1 October 2009 – 2013
- Constituency: Central Java VII

Personal details
- Born: 11 October 1968 (age 57) Pati, Central Java, Indonesia
- Party: Gerindra (since 2013)
- Other political affiliations: Democratic (until 2013)
- Spouse: Atik Kusdarwati
- Children: 4

Sudewo (born 11 October 1968) is an Indonesian politician who served as the regent of Pati from 2025 until his arrest by the Corruption Eradication Commission (KPK) on 19 January 2026. A member of the Gerindra Party, Sudewo previously served as a member of the House of Representatives from 2009 to 2013 and again from 2019 to 2024. As regent, he has faced criticism over a property tax hike which has led to protests demanding his resignation.

== Early life ==
Sudewo was born on 11 October 1968 in Pati, Central Java. He attended high school in Pati, before majoring in civil engineering at Sebelas Maret University. After graduating in 1991, he then pursued a master's degree at Diponegoro University.

== Career ==
After graduating from Sebelas Maret, Sudewo began to work as a civil servant for the Ministry of Public Works.

In 2002, Sudewo put himself forward as a candidate for regent of Karanganyar with Juliyatmono as his running mate, though the pair lost the election. In the 2009 legislative election, he was elected a member of the House of Representatives, representing the electoral district of Central Java VII, as a member of the Democratic Party. In 2013, he left the Democratic Party for the Gerindra Party and was replaced as a House member by RA. Ida Riyanti. He returned to the House following the 2019 election as a member of Gerindra, representing the electoral district of Central Java III. He received 52,095 votes in the election. He was re-elected in the 2024 election with 44,333 votes.

=== Regent of Pati ===
In the 2024 Indonesian local elections, Sudewo announced his candidacy for the regent of Pati with Risma Ardhi Chandra as his running mate. The pair were elected with 419,684 votes or 53.53% of the vote. As regent, he ordered a staff reduction at Pati's Soewondo Regional Hospital due to perceived overcrowding. He also banned the usage of Sound horeg in the regency, though this policy was retracted after protests.

In an attempt at increasing the regional revenue, Sudewo sought to increase the Rural and Urban Land and Building Tax by 250%. This caused protests and demonstrations calling for Sudewo's resignation. On 13 August 2025, protesters gathered in front of the Pati Regional Administration Office carrying banners with anti-Sudewo messages, such as "Step down, Sudewo, or the people will remove you by force." By 14 August, Pati's Regional House of Representatives (DPRD) had agreed to form a special committee to investigate a potential impeachment of Sudewo. On 31 October 2025, the DPRD voted on his impeachment, but the motion failed with only PDI-P voting to impeach while the other six parties in the legislature voted against.

== Personal life ==
He is married to Atik Kusdarwati, and the couple has four children. Kusdarwati unsuccessfully ran for a DPR seat in 2024 from the same district as Sudewo.
