= Jepara =

Town in Central Java, Indonesia

- District and regency seat
- Kecamatan Jepara
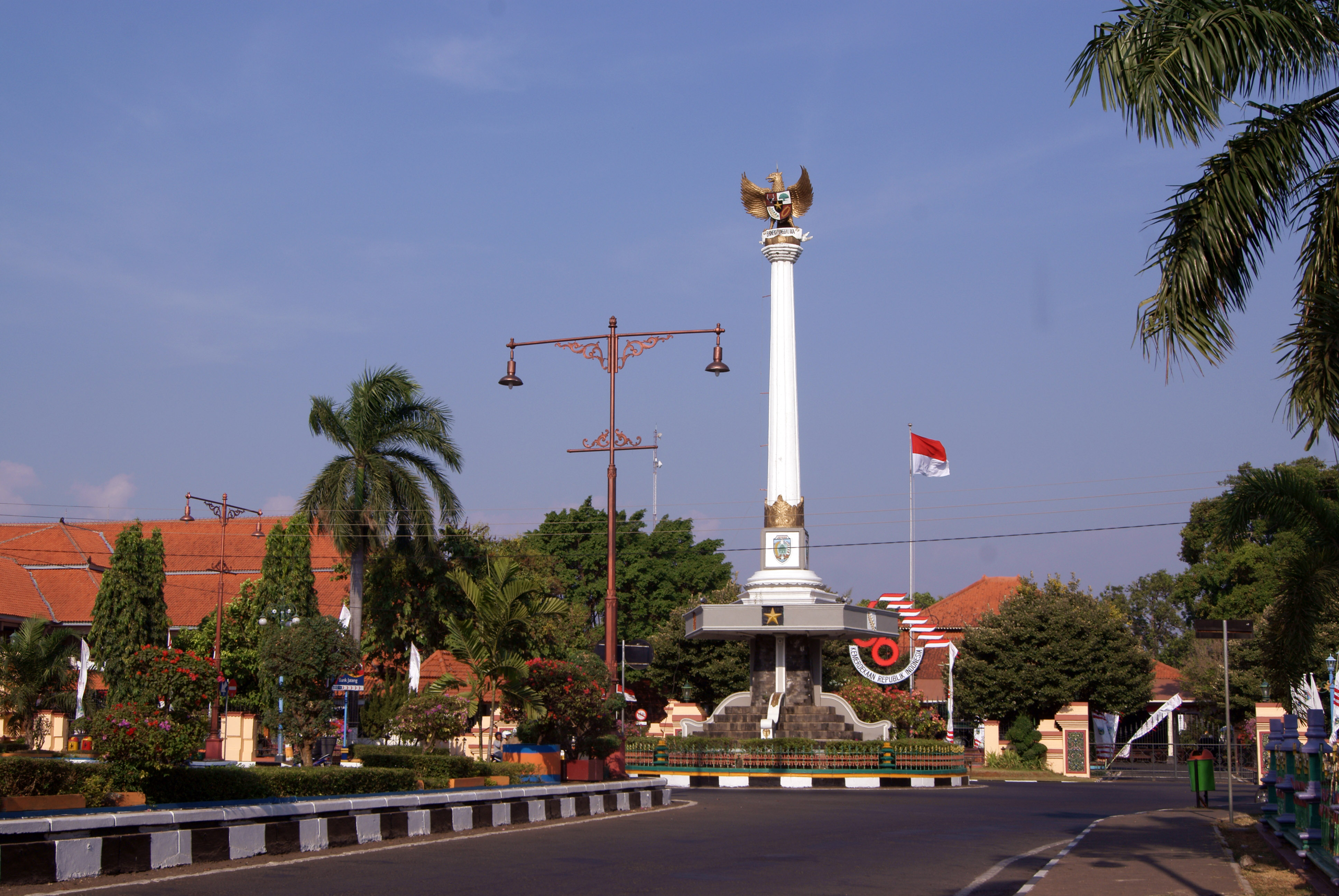
- Jepara Monument near the city square
- Nickname: The World Carving Centre
- Location within Java Location within Indonesia
- Coordinates: 6°32′0″S 110°40′0″E
- Country: Indonesia
- Province: Central Java
- Regency: Jepara Regency

Area
  - Total: 27.05 km^{2} (10.44 sq mi)
- Elevation: 768 m (2,520 ft)

Population (mid 2024)
  - Total: 85,970
  - Density: 3,178/km^{2} (8,231/sq mi)
- Time zone: UTC+7 (WIB)

Jepara is a town in the province of Central Java, Indonesia. Jepara is on the north coast of Java, northeast of Semarang, not far from Mount Muria, with a population of 85,970 in mid 2024. It is also the main town of Jepara Regency. The metropolitan area of the town ("Greater Jepara") had 227,062 inhabitants at the 1990 Census. Jepara is known for the Javanese teak wood carving art as well as the birthplace of Kartini, a pioneer in the area of women's rights for Indonesians.

== Demographics ==
The population of Jepara Regency was 1,283,687 people as at mid 2024 (50.3% males and 49.7% females). On the productivity criteria, those of working group age (between 15 and 64 years of age) dominate Jepara Regency's population at 68.82%, meanwhile 22.935% were the children (under 15) and 8.246% were retired-people (65 and over).

Jepara people are originally rooted as Javanese and religiously speaking, over 98% are Muslim.

The village of Plajan and the village of Tempur have a comparatively multi-religious population.

== History ==
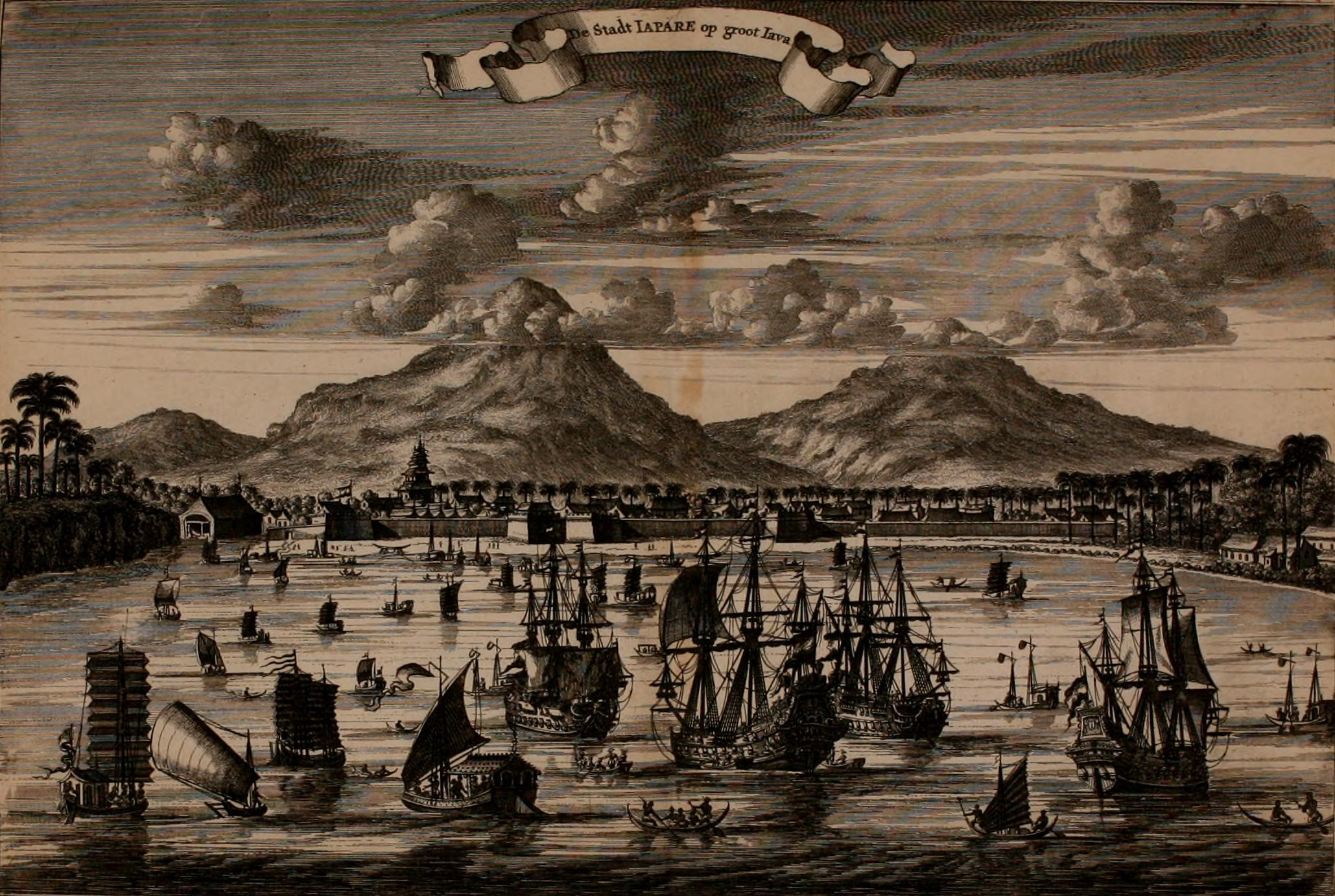
Jepara city views around the year 1650

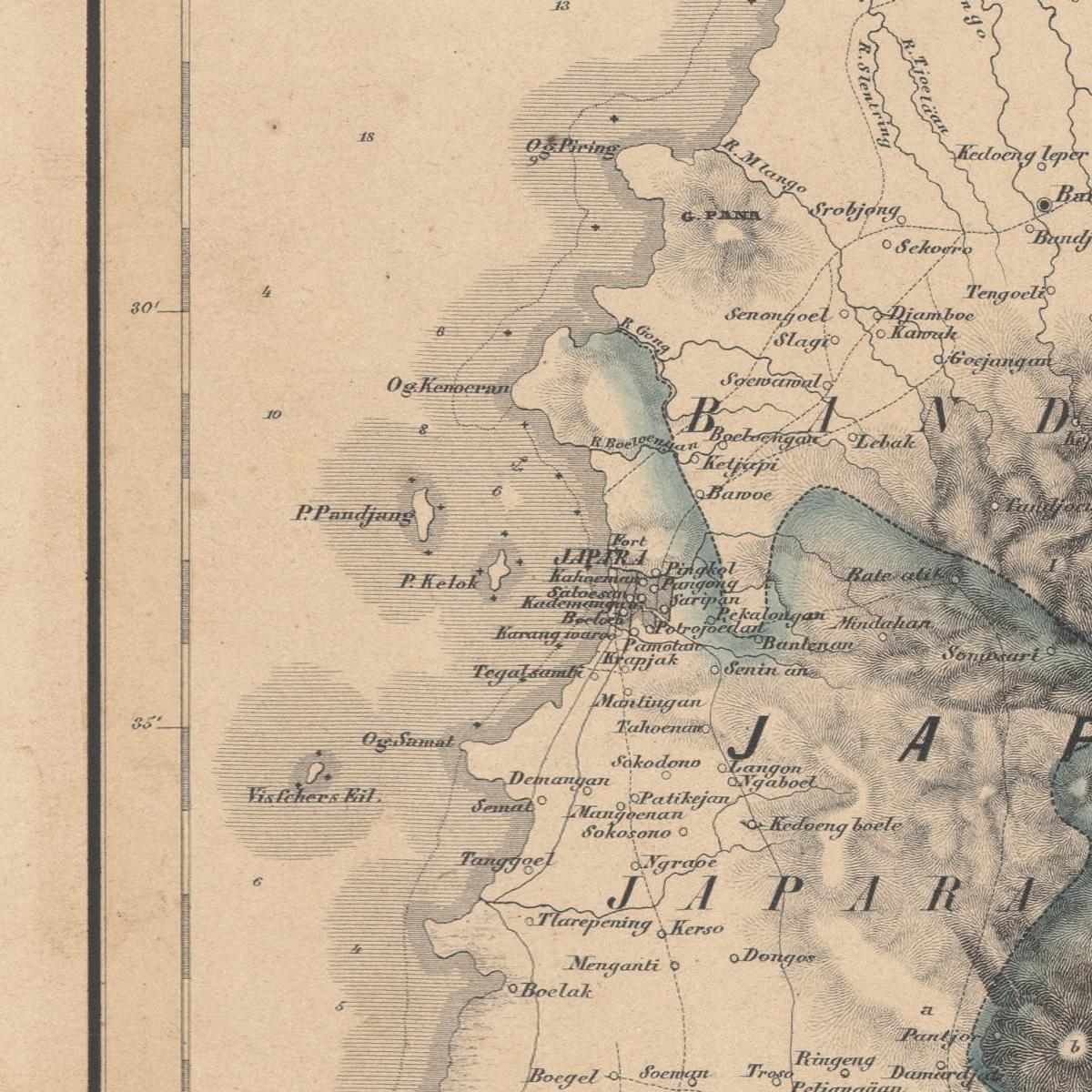
1858 map of Jepara

In the 16th century, Jepara was an important port; in early 1513, its king, Yunnus (Pati Unus) led an attack against Portuguese Malacca. His force is said to have been made up of one hundred ships and 5000 men from Jepara and Palembang but was defeated. Between 1518 and 1521 he ruled over Demak. The rule of Ratu ('Queen') Kalinyamat in the latter 16th century was, however, Jepara's most influential. Jepara again attacked Malacca in 1551 this time with Johor but was defeated, and in 1574 besieged Malacca for three months.

It was the site of a Dutch fort in the 17th century. It is the birthplace of Indonesian national heroine Kartini.

== Contemporary Jepara ==
The population is almost entirely Javanese and over 95% Muslim. As a pesisir ('coastal') area many traders from around the world landed in Jepara centuries ago. As a result, some of Jepara's residents have at part European, Chinese, Arabs, Malay or Bugis ancestry.

== Climate ==
Jepara has a tropical monsoon climate (Am) with moderate to little rainfall from May to October and heavy to very heavy rainfall from November to April.

Climate data for Jepara
Month	Jan	Feb	Mar	Apr	May	Jun	Jul	Aug	Sep	Oct	Nov	Dec	Year
Mean daily maximum °C (°F)	30.6 (87.1)	30.5 (86.9)	30.9 (87.6)	31.8 (89.2)	31.9 (89.4)	32.1 (89.8)	32.5 (90.5)	33.3 (91.9)	34.2 (93.6)	34.2 (93.6)	33.1 (91.6)	31.7 (89.1)	32.2 (90.0)
Daily mean °C (°F)	26.4 (79.5)	26.4 (79.5)	26.5 (79.7)	27.2 (81.0)	27.1 (80.8)	26.8 (80.2)	26.5 (79.7)	26.9 (80.4)	27.7 (81.9)	28.2 (82.8)	27.8 (82.0)	26.9 (80.4)	27.0 (80.7)
Mean daily minimum °C (°F)	22.2 (72.0)	22.3 (72.1)	22.2 (72.0)	22.6 (72.7)	22.4 (72.3)	21.5 (70.7)	20.6 (69.1)	20.6 (69.1)	21.3 (70.3)	22.2 (72.0)	22.6 (72.7)	22.2 (72.0)	21.9 (71.4)
Average rainfall mm (inches)	646 (25.4)	481 (18.9)	363 (14.3)	180 (7.1)	103 (4.1)	55 (2.2)	27 (1.1)	20 (0.8)	41 (1.6)	86 (3.4)	199 (7.8)	442 (17.4)	2,643 (104.1)
Source: Climate-Data.org

== Kingdoms ==
- Kalingga Kingdom
- Kalinyamat Kingdom

== Sport ==
- Persijap
- Jepara United

== Gallery ==
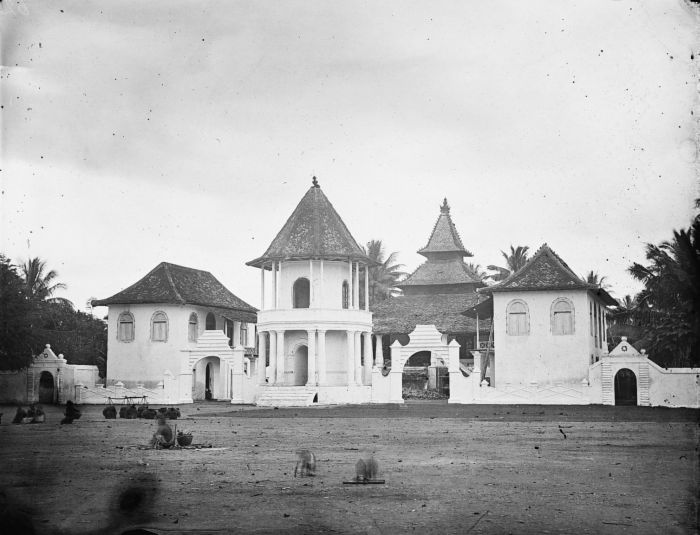
Mosque in Jepara, Pati Regency
