= Pati, Pati =

District in Central Java, Indonesia

Pati
- District-level town
- Interactive map of Pati
- Country: Indonesia
- Province: Central Java
- Regency: Pati Regency

Area
  - Total: 42.49 km^{2} (16.41 sq mi)

Population (mid 2024)
  - Total: 108,931
  - Density: 2,564/km^{2} (6,640/sq mi)
- Time zone: UTC+07:00 (WIB)
- Postal code: 59111 - 59119

Pati is the capital and the namesake of the Pati Regency in Central Java, Indonesia. According to the 2020 census, its population was 108,398; the official estimate (for mid 2024) was 108,931.

== Climate ==
Pati has a tropical monsoon climate (Am) with moderate to little rainfall from May to October and heavy to very heavy rainfall from November to April.

Climate data for Pati
Month	Jan	Feb	Mar	Apr	May	Jun	Jul	Aug	Sep	Oct	Nov	Dec	Year
Mean daily maximum °C (°F)	31.2 (88.2)	31.1 (88.0)	31.4 (88.5)	32.1 (89.8)	31.9 (89.4)	32.0 (89.6)	32.4 (90.3)	33.3 (91.9)	34.4 (93.9)	34.7 (94.5)	33.8 (92.8)	32.4 (90.3)	32.6 (90.6)
Daily mean °C (°F)	26.7 (80.1)	26.7 (80.1)	26.9 (80.4)	27.3 (81.1)	27.0 (80.6)	26.6 (79.9)	26.2 (79.2)	26.7 (80.1)	27.6 (81.7)	28.4 (83.1)	28.2 (82.8)	27.3 (81.1)	27.1 (80.9)
Mean daily minimum °C (°F)	22.3 (72.1)	22.4 (72.3)	22.4 (72.3)	22.5 (72.5)	22.2 (72.0)	21.2 (70.2)	20.1 (68.2)	20.2 (68.4)	20.9 (69.6)	22.1 (71.8)	22.7 (72.9)	22.3 (72.1)	21.8 (71.2)
Average rainfall mm (inches)	356 (14.0)	270 (10.6)	245 (9.6)	156 (6.1)	112 (4.4)	60 (2.4)	42 (1.7)	51 (2.0)	52 (2.0)	103 (4.1)	191 (7.5)	238 (9.4)	1,876 (73.8)
Source: Climate-Data.org
