= Kajen =

- Location in Central Java and Indonesia Kajen (Indonesia)
- Coordinates: 7°2′4.31″S 109°34′35.76″E
- Country: Indonesia
- Province: Central Java
- Regency: Pekalongan Regency
- District: Kajen District

Area
  - Total: 33.07 sq mi (85.65 km^{2})
- Elevation: 115 ft (35 m)

Population (mid 2025 Estimate)
  - Total: 80,919
  - Density: 2,447/sq mi (944.8/km^{2})
- Time zone: UTC+7 (Indonesia Western Standard Time)
- Postal code: 51161

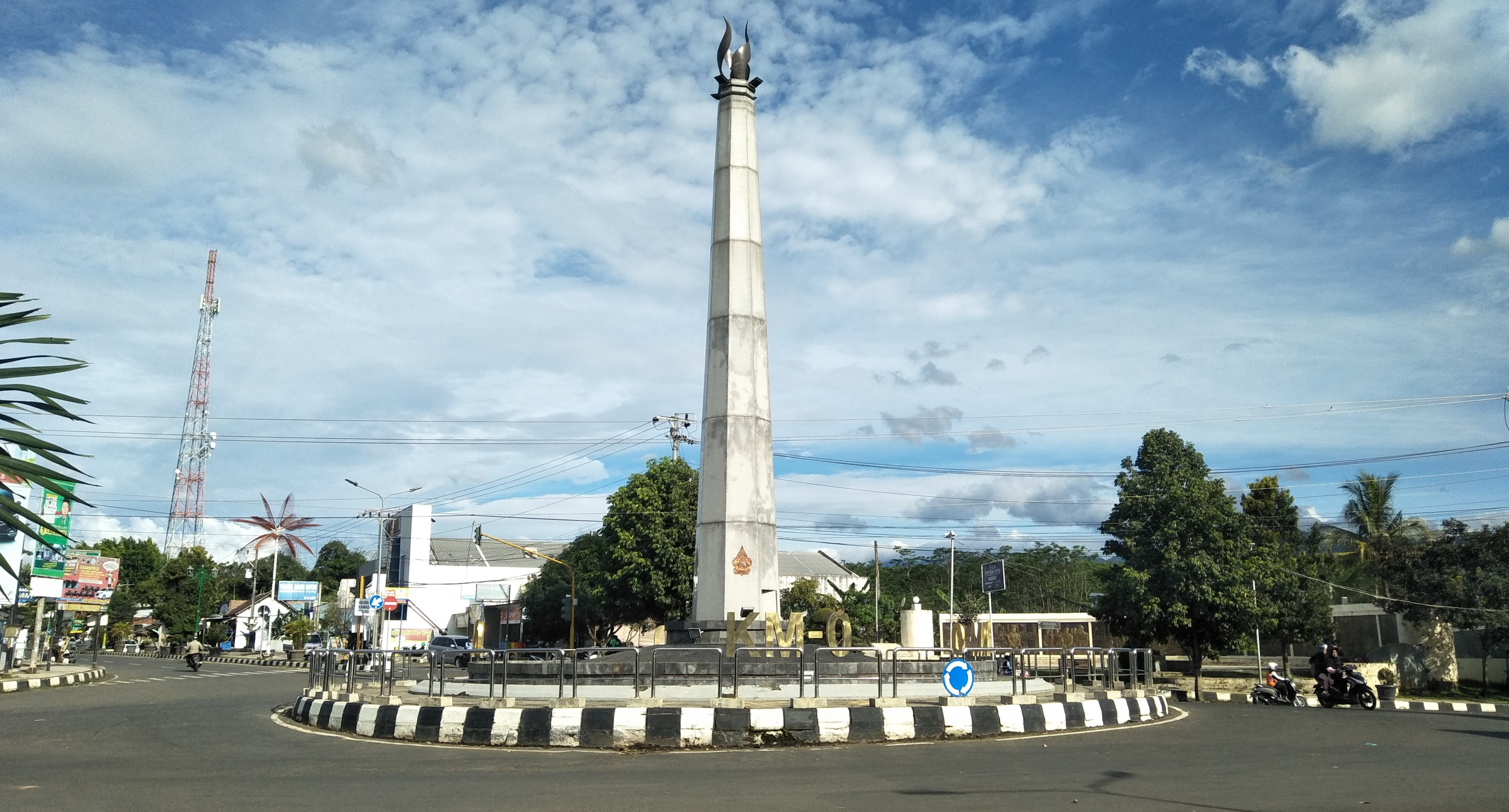
Tugu Kajen building, Kajen City, Pekalongan Regency.

Kajen is an administrative district (kecamatan) and a town (kelurahan) in Central Java Province of Indonesia, and is the administrative centre of the Pekalongan Regency in that province. It covers a land area of 75.15 km^{2}, and had a population of 58,048 at the 2010 Census and 73,067 at the 2020 Census; the official estimate as at mid 2025 was 80,919. It is sub-divided into the town (kelurahan) of Kajen and 24 rural villages (desa), all sharing the postcode of 51161. The town had 2,982 inhabitants as at mid 2023.

== Climate ==
Kajen has a tropical rainforest climate (Af) with moderate rainfall from June to September and heavy to very heavy rainfall from October to May.

Climate data for Kajen
| Month | Jan | Feb | Mar | Apr | May | Jun | Jul | Aug | Sep | Oct | Nov | Dec | Year |
|---|---|---|---|---|---|---|---|---|---|---|---|---|---|
| Mean daily maximum °C (°F) | 29.9 (85.8) | 30.1 (86.2) | 30.8 (87.4) | 31.2 (88.2) | 31.5 (88.7) | 31.3 (88.3) | 31.4 (88.5) | 31.5 (88.7) | 32.1 (89.8) | 32.2 (90.0) | 31.4 (88.5) | 30.6 (87.1) | 31.2 (88.1) |
| Daily mean °C (°F) | 25.9 (78.6) | 26.1 (79.0) | 26.6 (79.9) | 26.9 (80.4) | 27.1 (80.8) | 26.4 (79.5) | 26.2 (79.2) | 26.1 (79.0) | 26.7 (80.1) | 27.1 (80.8) | 26.8 (80.2) | 26.4 (79.5) | 26.5 (79.8) |
| Mean daily minimum °C (°F) | 22.0 (71.6) | 22.1 (71.8) | 22.5 (72.5) | 22.7 (72.9) | 22.7 (72.9) | 21.6 (70.9) | 21.0 (69.8) | 20.8 (69.4) | 21.4 (70.5) | 22.0 (71.6) | 22.3 (72.1) | 22.2 (72.0) | 21.9 (71.5) |
| Average rainfall mm (inches) | 528 (20.8) | 403 (15.9) | 337 (13.3) | 213 (8.4) | 181 (7.1) | 104 (4.1) | 98 (3.9) | 89 (3.5) | 88 (3.5) | 160 (6.3) | 225 (8.9) | 350 (13.8) | 2,776 (109.5) |
Source: Climate-Data.org

== Rural villages (desa) ==
Besides the town of Kajen, the district comprises 24 rural villages, tabled below with their populations as at mid 2023, with a combined district population of 76,818:

- Tambakroto (5,217)
- Kutorojo (2,681)
- Linggoasri (1,619)
- Brengkolang (2,054)
- Pringsurat (1,022)
- Sokoyoso (1,996)

- Sinangohprendeng (1,444)
- Kajongan (2,838)
- Pekiringanageng (1,863)
- Gandarum (1,776)
- Sabarwangi (6,076)
- Kalijoyo (2,033)

- Wonorejo (2,984)
- Pekiringan Alit (2,264)
- Kutorejo (4,218)
- Kajen (town) (2,972)
- Nyamok (3,990)
- Tanjungkulon (2,634)

- Tanjungsari (3,613)
- Gejlig (6,816)
- Kebonagung (5,825)
- Sangkanjoyo (2,007)
- Salit (2,528)
- Sambiroto (3,475)
- Rowolaku (2,873)
