= Pati Regency =

Regency in Central Java, Indonesia

Pati Regency Kabupaten Pati
- Regency
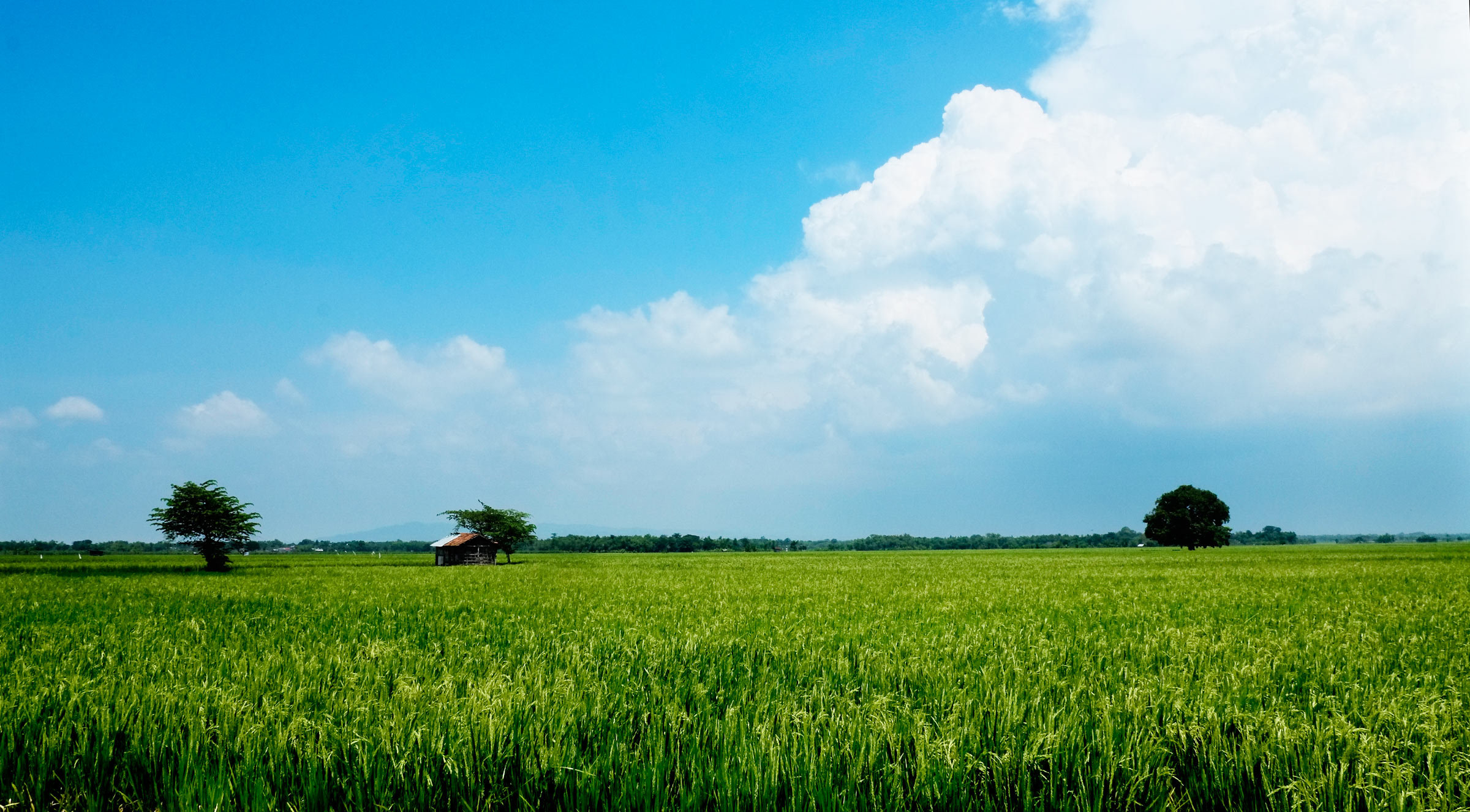
- Mintorahayu, Winong, Pati Regency

- Coat of arms
- Motto: BUMI MINA TANI acronym of Berdaya Upaya Menuju Identitas Pati Makmur Ideal Normatif Adil Tertib Aman Nyaman Indah (Powerful, Work, Towards Pati Identity, Ideal, Normative, Just, Orderly, Secure, Comfortable, Beautiful)
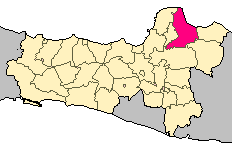
- Location of Pati Regency in Central Java

- Location of Pati Regency in Indonesia
- Coordinates: 7°35′46″S 110°57′3″E
- Country: Indonesia
- Province: Central Java
- Capital: Pati

Government
  - Regent: Sudewo
  - Vice Regent: Risma Ardhi Chandra

Area
  - Total: 1,572.90 km^{2} (607.30 sq mi)

Population (mid 2025 estimate)
  - Total: 1,381,912
  - Density: 878.576/km^{2} (2,275.50/sq mi)
- Time zone: UTC+7 (WIB)
- Area code: +62 295
- Website: patikab.go.id

Pati Regency (Javanese: Pathi, ꦥꦛꦶ) is a regency (Indonesian: kabupaten) in the northeastern region of Central Java Province, on the island of Java in Indonesia. The regency covers an area of 1,572.90 km^{2}, on the coast of the Java Sea. It had a population of 1,193,202 at the 2010 census and 1,324,188 at the 2020 census, comprising 660,484 males and 663,704 females; the official estimate as of mid 2025 was 1,381,912 (comprising 689,964 males and 691,948 females). The administrative capital of Pati Regency is the town of Pati.

== Administrative districts ==
The regency comprises twenty-one districts (kecamatan), tabulated below with their areas and their populations at the 2010 census and the 2020 census, together with the official estimates as of mid 2025. For convenience, this is divided into two sectors, south and north of the Kali Godi River (with no administrative significance). The table also includes the locations of the district administrative centres, the number of administrative villages in each district (totaling 401 rural desa and 5 urban kelurahan - the latter all in Pati town district), and its postcode.

Kode Wilayah	Name of District (kecamatan)	Area in km^{2}	Pop'n Census 2010	Pop'n Census 2020	Pop'n Estimate mid 2025	Admin centre	No. of villages	Post code
33.18.01	Sukolilo	163.02	84,703	90,270	92,394	Sukolilo	16	59172
33.18.02	Kayen	104.08	69,982	78,540	82,342	Kayen	17	59171
33.18.03	Tambakromo	79.53	47,849	55,616	59,293	Tambakromo	18	59174
33.18.11	Gabus	56.25	51,732	62,279	67,476	Gabus	24	59173
33.18.04	Winong	91.01	49,201	63,638	71,387	Winong	30	59181
33.18.05	Pucakwangi	121.12	41,170	47,934	51,100	Pucakwangi	20	59183
33.18.09	Jakenan	54.39	40,144	47,568	51,143	Jakenan	23	59182
33.18.06	Jaken	69.13	42,052	46,174	47,847	Sumberarum	21	59184
33.18.07	Batangan	57.29	40,847	44,619	46,189	Batursari	18	59186
33.18.08	Juwana	62.97	90,203	95,933	99,075	Doropayung	29	59185
Sub-totals	Southern sector	858.79	557,883	632,571	668,247	Pati	216	
33.18.10	Pati (town)	45.37	103,060	108,398	110,123	Pati Kidul	29 ^{(a)}	59111 -59119
33.18.12	Margorejo	70.25	55,982	64,091	68,015	Margorejo	18	59163
33.18.13	Gembong	74.81	42,210	47,370	49,686	Gembong	11	59162
33.18.14	Tlogowungu	87.33	49,088	54,300	56,513	Tlogoprejo	15	59161
33.18.15	Wedarijaksa	43.68	57,594	63,808	66,495	Wedarijaksa	18	59152
33.18.21	Trangkil	43.44	59,266	63,275	64,748	Trangkil	16	59153
33.18.16	Margoyoso	63.14	70,288	74,267	75,623	Waturoyo	22	59154
33.18.17	Gunungwungkal	71.07	34,969	37,898	39,046	Gunungwungkal	15	59156
33.18.18	Cluwak	73.04	42,345	47,338	49,505	Plaosan	13	59157
33.18.19	Tayu	53.00	64,318	70,022	72,258	Tayu Wetan	21	59155
33.18.20	Dukuhseti	88.98	56,199	60,850	62,654	Alasdowo	12	59158
Sub-totals	Northern sector	714.11	635,319	691,617	713,666	Pati	190	
	Totals	1,572.90	1,193,202	1,324,188	1,381,912	Pati	406	

Note: (a) comprises 5 urban kelurahan (Pati Wetan, Pati Kidul, Pati Lor, Parenggan and Kalidoro) and 24 rural desa.

=== Public services ===
The Regency has provided a 'public service mall' - a single building that houses access to all of the various government functions available to the public. This includes computers that can provide requested statistical data free of charge to citizens at any time that the building is open. In 2018, the Ministry of Manpower asked regional governments to improve such established one-stop integrated service centers focusing on workers' needs, integrating human resources, health services, police services, and immigration services which includes cultural education for Indonesians seeking work abroad.

Licensing services are expected to be available through electronic processing in mid-2024.

=== 2024 election controversies ===
Two messages were sent to 20 officials inviting them to a meeting scheduled on 19 January 2024. The second message indicated that the purpose of the meeting was to discuss which candidate to support in the upcoming election, a matter which Didik Rusdiartono – the official invited from the Pati Regency – stated did not come up at the meeting.

In February, a sign stating that Partai Buruh had been 'annulled' was identified as having originated in central Java. The Party had been disallowed in Pati Regency, but only at the Regional House of Representatives (DRPD) level, due to not having submitted required forms. The posted notice was not thought to have been issued from the elections commission.

A complete recount was finalized on 2 March 2024. This followed a demonstration on 1 March 2024 where the DRPD supported the right of the people to demand an inquiry into the election results, which the Pati Regency Community Alliance sued for.

Eleven seats on the DPRD were contested in Dapil Pati 2.

== Economy ==
Unemployment in Pati Regency was 4.29% in 2023, a decrease from 4.45% in 2022. In 2024, the minimum wage was set to 2,190,000 IDR, an increase from 2,107,698 IDR in 2023. Inflation in 2023 lowered to 2.49% in 2023 from 6% in 2022.

=== Community business development ===
In order to support the growth of the economy and continued job creation, the Regency supports the creation of community businesses. Bank Indonesia has identified 40 micro, small, and medium enterprises (MSMEs) in Pati Regency, with all but one in the processing industry.

An effort is being made by the Pati DPRD to include MSME products in local supermarkets and minimarts but the requirements of the system to distribute funds to the MSMEs from sales are proving to be an obstacle.

==== People's Business Credit (KUR) ====
To help support the growth of small business, the national government instituted the Kredit Usaha Rakyat (KUR) [id] in 2007 to provide loans to MSMEs. Between 2015 and 2021, KUR loans grew from 25% of borrowers to 74%.

On 8 April 2020, the MSME Financing Committee decided to waive interest and allow deferrals for up to six months, retroactive to 1 April 2020, in acknowledgement of the pandemic's effect on businesses.

=== Corporate development ===
The Regency government coordinates with the DRPD to create plans which allow for land development within the Regency. Industrial development must take green areas into consideration, and citizens can lodge complaints in the event that construction permits are issued against such land.

==== Cement factory controversy ====
In 2014, citizens wrote to the President of Indonesia seeking relief regarding the Regency's plans to build a cement factory in Tambakaromo and Kayen districts. There was great concern over selling rice fields and farms as these are considered sources of generational prosperity. PT Indocement Tunggal Prakarsa Tbk had stated that they expected to be able to commence construction in 2018, and claimed that farming in the region would not suffer as a result, despite social and nature issues not having been addressed and 60% of residents in the community voting against the plant. In protest against the factory and Regent Haryanto's decision to issue the permit without hearing citizen concerns first, residents held a rally that blocked roads from 9 AM until after 3 PM in Sukokulon Village.

On 17 November 2015, the permit issued by the Regency to Sahabat Mulia Sakti, a subsidiary of Indocement, was declared void by the Chief Justice of the Semarang State Administrative Court. That decision was overturned in 2016 by the Surabaya High State Administrative Court. Nine women engaged in protest outside the Merdeka Palace in Jakarta, encasing their feet in cement. President Joko Widodo ordered a Strategic Environmental Study in August 2016 along with the cessation of mining in the Kendeng Mountains, with the Supreme Court ruling on 5 October 2016 to revoke the mining permit in Rembang Regency. The presidential order called for a one-year moratorium on the construction sites, but Governor Ganjar Pranowo issued a new permit in 2017, which was considered to be a circumvention of the Supreme Court's decision to prevent the factory's construction.

Protests continued in 2017 against the company, including a demonstration outside the Merdeka Palace where 40 German citizens protested the involvement of Heidelberg Cement in Indocement, concerned over German involvement in the environmental issues citizens believe the factory would create in the Kendeng Mountains region. Protesters from Pati and Rembang encased their feet in cement. One woman died. Following a Supreme Court hearing in March 2017 which found in favor of the cement company, Indocement's president, Christian Kartawijaya, claimed that Pati residents had no legal basis to argue against the construction.

A complaint was filed with the OECD on 9 September 2020 against both Heidelberg Cement and the subsidiary PT Indocement, stating that the companies had violated human rights standards. Additionally, complaints were also filed with the International Finance Cooperation of the World Bank and the Germany's National Contact Point for Responsible Business Conduct.

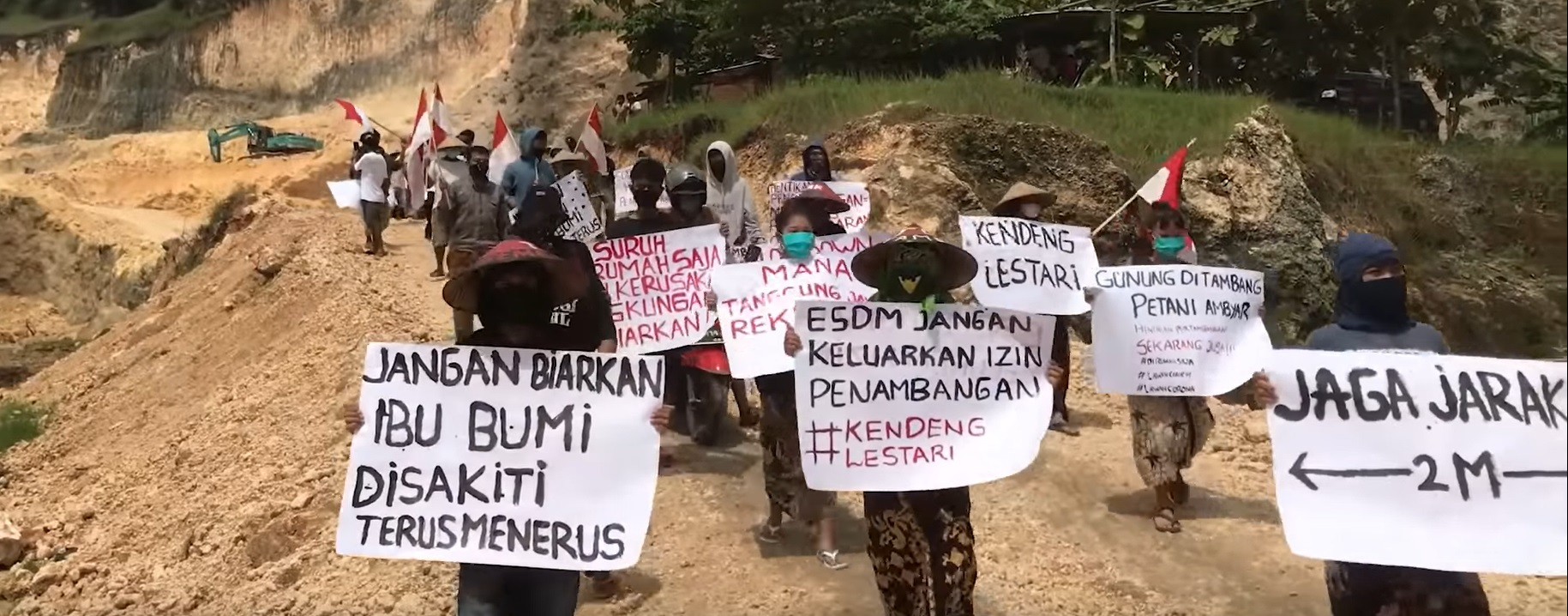
Environmental protestors in Pati Regency

In a revised regulation after the COVID-19 pandemic, the Tambakromo district was designated as industrial, despite residents' concerns that the flood-prone region will be negatively impacted by the establishment of a cement factory.

== Tourism ==
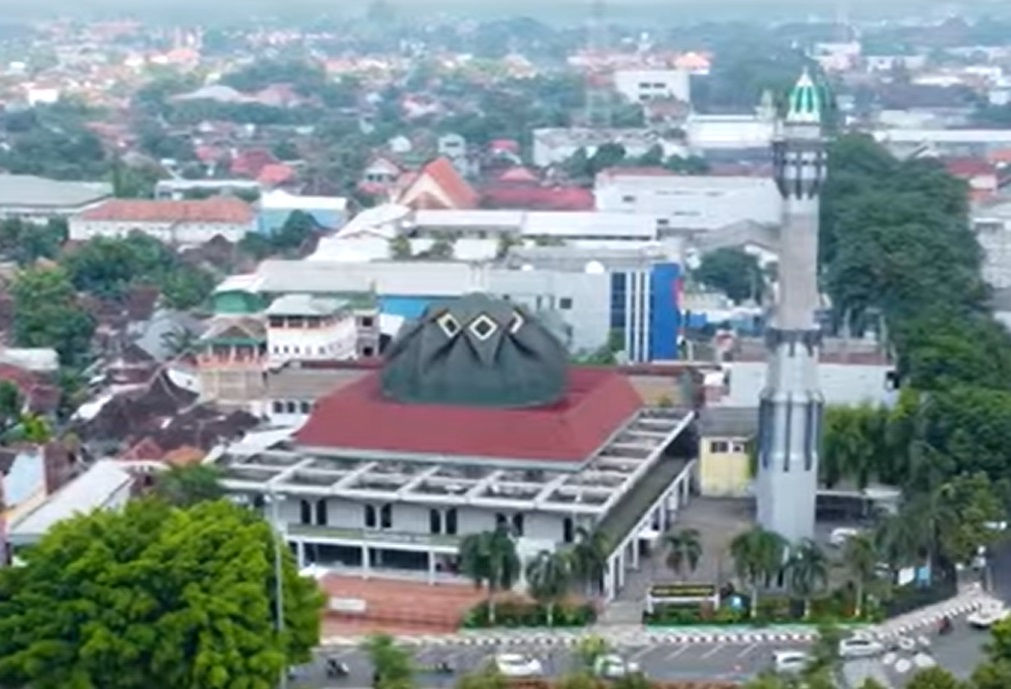
Grand Mosque in Pati City, 2022

=== Nature sites ===
- Wareh Cave [id], in Kedumulyo Kayen Village
- Pancur Cave [id], in Jimbaran Kayen Village
- Seloromo Reservoir [id], in Gembong Village

=== Historical sites ===
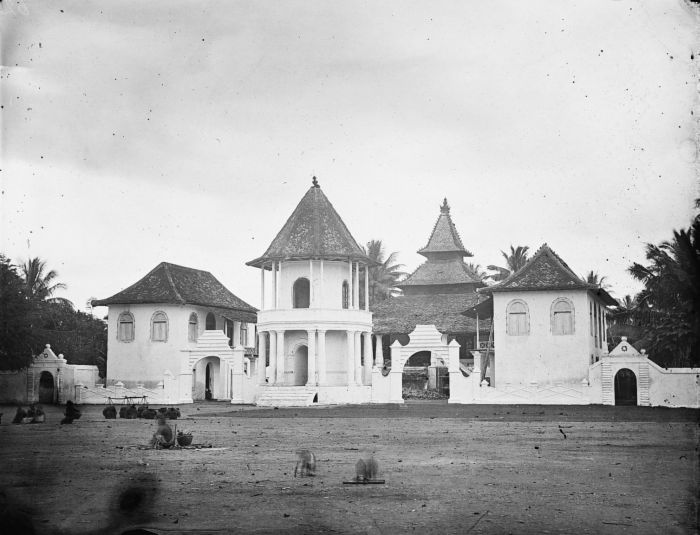
Pati mosque (c.1900-1940).

- Pati Grand Mosque [id], in Pati City
- Majapahit Gate [id], in Muktiharjo / Rendole Village

=== Pilgrimage ===
- Tomb of Nyai Ageng Ngerang [id], in Tambakromo Village
- Tomb of KH. Sahal Mahfudz, in Kajen Village
- Tomb of Sunan Prawoto [id] (King of the Fourth Demak Kingdom), in Prawoto Village

== Regional agricultural production ==
=== Crops ===
Farmers in this area of Indonesia utilise sustainable farming techniques, and as of 2020, the land could still support the needs of the population in producing rice. It is predicted that Pati Regency's rice production will continue to be able to support its population through at least 2030. Some paddy farmers have joined the Asuransi Usaha Tani Padi, an agricultural insurance provided in the Pati Regency, to protect their interests should they experience crop failure.

In 2020, Pati Regency produced 1,030,757 tonnes of Kopyor coconuts.

=== Livestock ===
==== Beef cattle ====
Indonesia imports between 70,000 and 150,000 tonnes of beef on a nearly annual basis from Australia, Brazil, and India, making the cultivation of cattle farming an economic priority. Pati Regency accounted for 6.12% of the beef cattle industry in Central Java in 2019. Cattle comprised 74.26% of livestock in the Regency in 2021.

One of the determining factors regarding beef cattle farming in Pati Regency has been the long return-on-investment; it is estimated that it takes nine years, nine months, and nine days to simply break even. One third of the administrative districts show the industry as superior, and one third as prospective, with five of the remaining districts showing it as needing improvement to be sustainable. Only Sukolilo and Margoyoso show enough sustainability in cattle farming for it to be a primary commodity.

One reason for the difficulty in achieving sustainable cattle farming is difficulty breeding, as records in 2021 showed that farmers were required to attempt insemination between two and five times before the cow was impregnated. The head of the Animal Husbandry Division discussed assistance in obtaining bovine sperm for artificial insemination to aid in increasing breeding in 2021, when 34 people were employed as artificial insemination officers. The Regency has multiple programs in place to help livestock farmers, though a focus on turning the resulting waste (manure) into a useful by-product has been recommended to increase sustainability.

The government provided vaccinations against lumpy skin disease and hoof-mouth disease throughout the Regency to prevent outbreaks in 2023.

==== Chickens ====
Regency farmers have described difficulties in maintaining chicken coops in 2023. A decrease in egg prices at the end of 2023 with feed prices still being relatively high has resulted in smaller chicken farms failing. The problem with falling egg prices began to threaten the viability of egg farming in 2021, with hundreds of farmers facing the possible failure of their farms due to the disparity between the price of feed and the price of eggs.

A particular breed known as the Asil chicken sells for more than the average chicken due to its more aesthetically-pleasing appearance.

==== Sheep and goats ====
There is a breeders group for goats and sheep in the Regency to help spread methods of animal husbandry called the Pati Regency Sheep and Goat Breeders Association (PPDK).

Goats are raised in part as sacrificial animals, though production is not as high as demand in the region. The difference in price during Eid al-Adha can reach 500,000 IDR.

Goats have also been provided by the Central Java government as livestock to villages which are deemed to be extremely impoverished, with the goal being to encourage goat farming.

=== Companies ===
In addition to the famous Bandeng Presto/Bandung Juwana, Pati is one of the two largest mangosteen producing districts in Central Java besides Cilacap.

- Cashew Industrial Center, in Margorejo village.
- Mangosteen Center, in Jepalo and Gunungsari Villages
- Brass Craft, in Juwana Village
- Cow milk business, in Sukoharjo Village
- Salt Industry, in District Batangan
- Trangkil Sugar Factory, in Trangkil Village
- New Pakis Sugar Factory, in Pakis village
- Cassava kripik with various flavours, in Banyuurip village
- Kapuk randu Industry, in Karaban Village, Gabus District.
- The center of rice and green beans, in Jambean Kidul Village, Margorejo Pati.
- Coffee Plantation, in Jrahi Village, Gunungwungkal and Sitiluhur
- Tapioca Flour Industry, in Ngemplak Village, Margoyoso
- Batik Bakaran Industrial Fabrics, in Bakaran Village, Juwana
- Brick Industry, in Trangkil Village
- Shrimp paste Industry, in Juwana Village, Margoyoso and Tayu

== Regency achievements ==
Pati Regency is not only famous as a city of agricultural land, Pati also has many achievements thanks to the performance and efforts of the government, as well as the people of Pati themselves who have a work ethic and abilities that are rarely known by the local community. Pati's achievements include:

- Pati city received the "cleanest small town" award from the President of the Republic of Indonesia on 5 June 1996, commemorated by a statue.
- Langse Village, Margorejo District, was chosen to represent Pati Regency to become an Energy Independent Village for Central Java Province. The "Submarine" reactor is the name of the installation of equipment for processing rabbit, goat and other waste, namely a biogas and fertilizer factory produced by local residents.
- Pati is one of the 13 districts in Indonesia that has 100% implemented Siskudes. Pati Regency has received an Unqualified Opinion (WTP) three times in a row from the Financial Audit Agency (BPK) Representative of Central Java Province.
- Student Melati Alfatannafiah from SD Muhammadiyah Represents Indonesia in the International Mathematics Competition appointed by the Director General of Primary and Secondary Education, Ministry of Education and Culture of the Republic of Indonesia to represent Indonesia in the Bulgarian International Mathematics Competition (BIMC) in Burgas, Bulgaria.

== Education ==
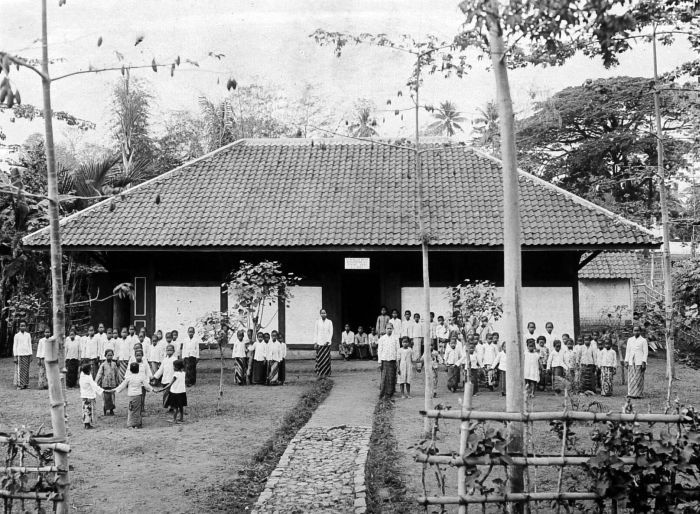
A school in Pati, colonial Dutch East Indies era.

There are a total of 879 elementary, 224 junior high, and 135 high schools in Pati Regency. The federal government has implemented a system of compulsory basic education, which must be provided without charge. For students aged seven to twelve, the Regency still did not have 100% enrollment as of 2022.

In 2018, Indonesia was ranked sixth lowest in world literacy. It was suggested that comics be used as a vehicle for increasing literacy as well as preserving cultural knowledge in the area. These alternative materials have been deemed necessary as the books provided by the Indonesian government have been determined to be unable to adapt to the specific needs of students in the Pati Regency.

The border regions and suburban areas are demonstrably less developed than urban areas, and often have infrastructure issues which present difficulties in increasing education for the residents in these areas. During the rainy season, schools are often flooded and students must take classes online. This has resulted in some teachers asking the government to intervene, to build the schools at elevation in hopes of preventing the annual floods. The secondary schools in these parts of the Regency are supported in large part by the Islamic community.

There are also non-formal education classes offered to the community through activity centres and groups that provide an alternative for those who are unable to afford formal education. Included among these are life skills classes.

The Regency provides annual financial assistance to teachers. In April 2024, assistance payments were made to 12,443 instructors. They also receive holiday pay equivalent to one month's salary.

== COVID-19 ==
Pati Regency was located in one of the 'red zones' as a result of having a greater number of fatalities than other areas. Data regarding the infection through 13 December 2020 showed that the Regency accounted for 17.45% of the total cases in Central Java. During the pandemic, the government issued restrictions on physical distance and mobility. This affected several industries, such as the fishing industry where prices decreased by about 50%. Market demand declined as well, with a reduction of about 30% in exports and 15% domestically. Unemployment generally increased throughout 2020 and 2021, and already impoverished families in the area became increasingly destitute.

Coaches and trainers at the Pati Training Archery Club used online platforms to attempt to keep athletes in shape during the pandemic, in accordance with the government-issued Circular Number 4.

Students engaged in online learning during the pandemic did report that they were able to quickly find information to complete assignments; however, there was also a decline in eye health due to constantly staring at a digital screen.

A 2021 assessment of funding found that the economic strain on local communities, a direct result of the pandemic, would require the Regency government to provide shared funding for elementary and junior high students in order to compensate for the difference in what the national funding already provided.

As of February 2022, the Pati Regency had a 37% rate for children having received the COVID-19 vaccine. Nationwide, parents of multiple or older children were more likely to obtain the vaccine. It was suggested that educating the parents on the vaccine would increase area vaccination totals, with some concern that parents were not even aware of the vaccination policies for children.

On 11 February 2022, the government issued Circular Number 440/426, suspending all in-person learning after testing at multiple schools returned positive results for the virus among both teachers and students.

As of January 2024, nearly 80% of the population of the Regency had not been vaccinated, despite the availability of vaccines at Community Health Centers and a spike in COVID-19 cases at the end of 2023.

== Radio and TV broadcasting institutions ==
=== Radio ===
list of Radio in Pati is as follows:

- Radio Suara Pati FM Jl. P. Tombronegoro No.1 Pati
- Pt. Radio BOSWIN/ Radio Boswin FM Jl. Pati-Gabus No.1 Pati
- PT. Radio HARBOS / Radio Harbos FM Jl. Raya Pati-Gabus No. 1A
- PT. Radio Pati Adi Suara/ Radio PAS FM Jl. P. Sudirman Km 3 Pati
- PT.RADIO SESANTI MANDIRI/ Radio POP FM Jl Banyuurip Km 3 Margorejo, Pati
- PT. RADIO PRAGOLA/ Radio BEST FM Jl Banyuurip Km 3 Margorejo, Pati
- PT.RADIO PESANTENAN/ Radio PST FM Jl. Syeh Jangkung No.164 Pati
- Radio Swara Juana Sakti FM Jl. Sunan Ngerang No. 2A Juwana
- Radio Foster FM Jl. RA Kartini No.03
- Radio ISMA FM KH. Mansyur Ds. Kauman Rt 01/02 Pati
- Radio Komunitas Kristen Elshaday Radio Komunitas Kristen Elshaday
- PT. Radio Cendekia Winong/ Radio Cendekia FM Jl. Raya Jakenan- Winong Km. 05 Pati
- PT. Radio Ndholo Kusumo/ Radio Ndholo Kusumo FM Ds. Margoyoso RT.02 Rw. II Kec.

=== TV ===
List of TVs in Pati include the following:

- Kartika TV Jl. Dr Wahidin Ruko Salza No. 15-16 Pati
- TV Simpanglima address Perum Gunung Bedah Jl. P Sudirman Km.5 Pati
- PT. Merdeka Sarana Media / SM TV address Jl. Raya Pati-Kudus Km. 4 Pati
- Kudus Televisi Indonesia address GriAlamat Griya Kencana 2 jl. Gaharu raya no. 48 kel. Sidokerto Pati
- ANTV Pati address Pati
- Viva Sport Indonesia 1 address Pati
- TV One Pati address Jl. Dr. Susanto 98 Parenggan Pati
- Lingkar TV address Jl. Dr Wahidin No. 2 Pati Lor Kec. Kota Pati Kab. Pati

== Health ==
=== Hospital ===
- RS Kristen Tayu
- RSUD RAA Soewondo
- RS Keluarga Sehat Hospital (KSH)
- RS Mitra Bangsa
- RS Fastabiq
- RSB Harapan
- RS Budi Agung Juwana (RSBA) Terakreditasi Paripurna
- RSB Asifa
- RS Paru-paru
- RS Islam Pati
- RS Assuyuthiyyah Guyangan
- RSU Kayen
- RS Internasional Pengging Wangi (Tahap perencanaan)

=== Clinic ===
- Klinik Sejahtera
- BKIA Bhayangkari
- Klinik Keluarga Sehat
- Klinik Ben Mari Juwana

=== Puskesmas ===
Source: Perkuat Kolaborasi, Tingkatkan Solidaritas Menuju Ending Aids 2030

- SUKOLILO I jl. Raya. Sukolilo, Kec.Sukolilo
- SUKOLILO II Sunan Prawoto, Kec.Sukolilo
- KAYEN Pati Purwadadi, Kec.Kayen
- TAMBAKROMO Jl. Raya Gabus Kayen, Kec.Tambakromo
- WINONG I Jl. Raya Winong, Kec.Winong
- WINONG II Danyang Mulyo, Kec.Winong
- PUNCAKWANGI I Ds. Puntadewa, Kec. Puncakwangi
- PUNCAKWANGI II Ds. Tegalwero, Kec.Pucakwangi
- JAKEN Jaken Jakenan, Kec.Jaken
- BATANGAN Juana Rembang, Kec.Batangan
- JUWANA Kihajar Dewantara, Kec.Juwana
- JAKENAN Ds. Dukuhmulyo, Kec. Jakenan
- PATI I Jl. Supriyadi No. 51, Kec. Pati
- PATI II Jl. Raya Pati Tayu, Kec. Pati
- GABUS I Ds. Gabus Tlogo Ayu, Kec.Gabus
- GABUS II Pati Kayen, Kec.Gabus
- MARGOREJO Jl. Raya Pati Kudus, Kec. Margorejo
- GEMBONG Jl. Raya Gembong, Kec.Gembong
- TLOGOWUNGU Jl. Raya Patitlogowungu 61, Kec.Tlogowungu
- WEDARIJAKSA I Ds. Wedarijaksa, Kec. Wedarijaksa
- WEDARIJAKSA II Ds. Sidoarjo, Kec.Wedarijaksa
- TRANGKIL Ds. Trangkil, Kec. Trangkil
- MARGOYOSO I Jl. Kyai Cebolang No. 16, Kec.Margoyoso
- MARGOYOSO II Jl. Raya Pati Tayu, Kec.Margoyoso
- GUNUNG WUNGKAL Tayu Gunung Wungkal, Kec. Gunungwungkal
- CLUWAK Ds. Plaosan, Kec. Cluwak
- TAYU I Jl. Sudirman 17, Kec.Tayu
- TAYU II Ds. Pundenrejo, Kec.Tayu
- DUKUHSETI Ds. Alas Dowo, Kec.Dukuhseti
