= Pekalongan Regency =

Regency in Central Java, Indonesia

Pekalongan Regency Kabupaten Pekalongan
- Regency

Other transcription(s)
  - Javanese: ꦑꦧꦸꦥꦠꦺꦤ꧀ꦦꦼꦏꦭꦺꦴꦔꦤ꧀
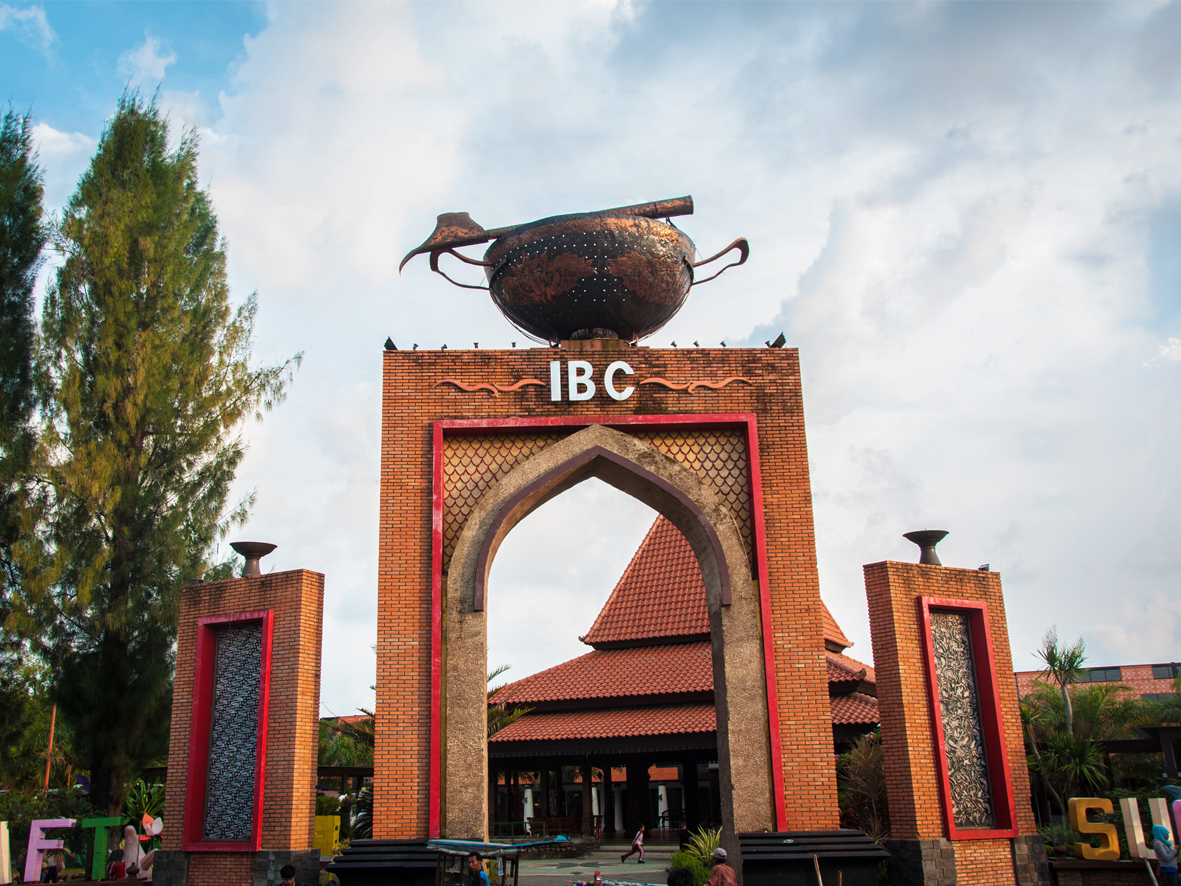
- International Batik Center

- Coat of arms

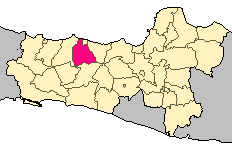
- Location within Central Java

- Location in Java and Indonesia Pekalongan Regency (Indonesia)
- Coordinates: 6°52′57″S 109°40′12″E
- Country: Indonesia
- Region: Java
- Province: Central Java
- Capital: Kajen

Government
  - Regent: Fadia A. Rafiq
  - Vice Regent: Riswadi

Area
  - Total: 892.91 km^{2} (344.75 sq mi)

Population (mid 2025 estimate)
  - Total: 1,030,342
  - Density: 1,153.9/km^{2} (2,988.6/sq mi)
- Time zone: UTC+7 (Indonesia Western Standard Time)
- Area code: (+62) 285
- Website: pekalongankab.go.id

Pekalongan Regency is a regency (Indonesian: kabupaten) on the north coast of Central Java province in Indonesia. It covers an area of 892.91 km^{2} and had a population of 838,621 at the 2010 census and 968,821 at the 2020 census; the official estimate as at mid 2025 was 1,030,342 (comprising 523,526 males and 506,816 females). Its administrative centre was formerly at Pekalongan City, but since that city was administratively separated from the regency, the regency's capital is now at Kajen, which is located in the middle of the regency, about 28 km south of Pekalongan City. The regency was originally much larger, but on 14 June 1965 its eastern half was split off and formed into a separate Batang Regency. Pekalongan residents are well known for their pursuit of perfection regarding the Indonesian traditional clothing called Batik.

The Dutch name of the regency was Pacalongan.

== Etymology ==
According to the popular legend, the word Pekalongan is believed to be derived from the Javanese word, Topo Ngalong, which means "bat-like meditation". Meanwhile, Javanese toponymical pattern of Pa/Pe- -An actually means place of-, so the name Pa- Kalong -An means place of Kalong or fruit bat in Javanese.

== Geography ==
The northern part of the Pekalongan Regency is lowland, while the southern part of the regency is highland. The districts of Buaran, Siwalan, Tirto, Wiradesa and Wonokerto in the north coastal area together cover 91.20 km^{2} and had a population of 282,652 in mid 2025, essentially the western and southern suburbs of Pekalongan city.

== Administrative districts ==
Pekalongan Regency comprises nineteen districts (kecamatan), tabulated below with their areas and their populations at the 2010 census and the 2020 census, together with the official estimates as at mid 2025. The table also includes the locations of the district administrative centres, the number of administrative villages in each district (totaling 272 rural desa and 13 urban kelurahan), and its post code.

Region code	Name of District (kecamatan)	Area in km^{2}	Pop'n census 2010	Pop'n census 2020	Pop'n estimate mid 2025	Admin centre	No. of villages	Post code
33.26.01	Kandangserang	76.31	31,808	35,745	37,473	Kandangserang	14	51163
33.26.02	Paninggaran	97.71	34,221	41,837	45,684	Paninggaran	15	51164
33.26.03	Lebakbarang	63.11	9,885	11,116	11,657	Lebakbarang	11	51183
33.26.04	Petungkriyono	83.08	11,882	13,179	13,729	Yosorejo	9	51193
33.26.05	Talun	49.77	25,412	30,667	33,277	Kalirejo	10	51192
33.26.06	Doro	77.12	37,071	45,207	49,303	Doro	14	51191
33.26.07	Karanganyar	57.68	35,698	45,088	50,016	Legokkalong	15	51182
33.26.08	Kajen (district)	85.65	58,048	73,067	80,919	Kajen	25 ^{(a)}	51161
33.26.09	Kesesi	68.82	61,228	71,708	76,691	Kaibahan	23	551162
33.26.10	Sragi	34.14	60,665	65,451	67,274	Bulak Pelem	17 ^{(b)}	51155
33.26.17	Siwalan	27.95	37,573	41,447	43,062	Siwalan	13	51137
33.26.11	Bojong	43.09	62,460	74,681	80,675	Bojong Minggir	22	51156
33.26.12	Wonopringgo	20.66	41,186	47,656	50,671	Rowokembu	14	51181
33.26.13	Kedungwuni	23.06	90,774	100,796	105,057	Kedungwuni Barat	19 ^{(c)}	51173
33.26.18	Karangdadap	21.51	33,413	41,255	45,264	Karangdadap	11	51174
33.26.14	Buaran	9.06	42,495	47,022	48,927	Wonoyoso	10 ^{(d)}	51171
33.26.15	Tirto	20.39	65,002	74,687	79,142	Pacar	16	51151 -51182
33.26.16	Wiradesa	13.39	56,065	62,139	64,708	Kepatihan	16 ^{(e)}	51127 -51152
33.26.19	Wonokerto	20.41	43,735	46,073	46,813	Wonokerto Kulon	11	51153
	Totals	892.91	838,621	968,821	1,030,342	Kajen	285	

Notes: (a) including one kelurahan - Kajen. (b) including one kelurahan - Bulak Pelem.
(c) including three kelurahan - Kedungwuni Barat, Kedungwuni Timur and Pekajangan.
(d) including three kelurahan - Bligo, Sapugarut and Simbang Kulon.
(e) including five kelurahan - Bener, Gumawang, Kepatihan, Mayangan and Pekuncen.

== Tourism ==
Pekalongan has long been known as a "batik city", and one of the centers of batik production is in the Districts of Buaran and Wiradesa. Some of the names of batik producers that are quite well known include Batik Humas (short for Husein Mohammad Assegaff). While the famous sarong (palekat fabric) factory in Pekalongan includes "Gajah Duduk" and "WadiMoor". There is also a batik center in Wiradesa which is International Batik Center (IBC).

Pekalongan Regency possesses significant tourist potential. Notable natural and cultural attractions include Sunter Beach Depok, Watu Bahan, Wonokerto Beach, Petungkriyono Ecotourism, Curug Siwatang Paninggaran, Trenggalek Temple, Anjir Peak, and Bukit Pawuluhan in Kandangserang. The region is also home to less-accessible natural sites, such as the Curug Bajing waterfall, which currently lacks developed roads.

For food connoisseurs, Pekalongan provides culinary tourism in the form of Taoto and megono rice, Taoto is a kind of soto that is made with taco sauce and with meat and buffalo spices. Medium megono is chopped young jackfruit flavored with grated coconut and steamed which is suitable to be enjoyed while still hot

For those of you who like historical tours, you can visit the Pabrik Gula Sragie sugar factory located in the Sragi District. The factory is a Dutch colonial factory.

In the southern part of regency there is a mountainous tourist area named Linggo Asri, which includes bathing area, relics of lingga and yoni, playground and pine forest. There are also Pekalongan Hindu communities here.

== Transportation ==
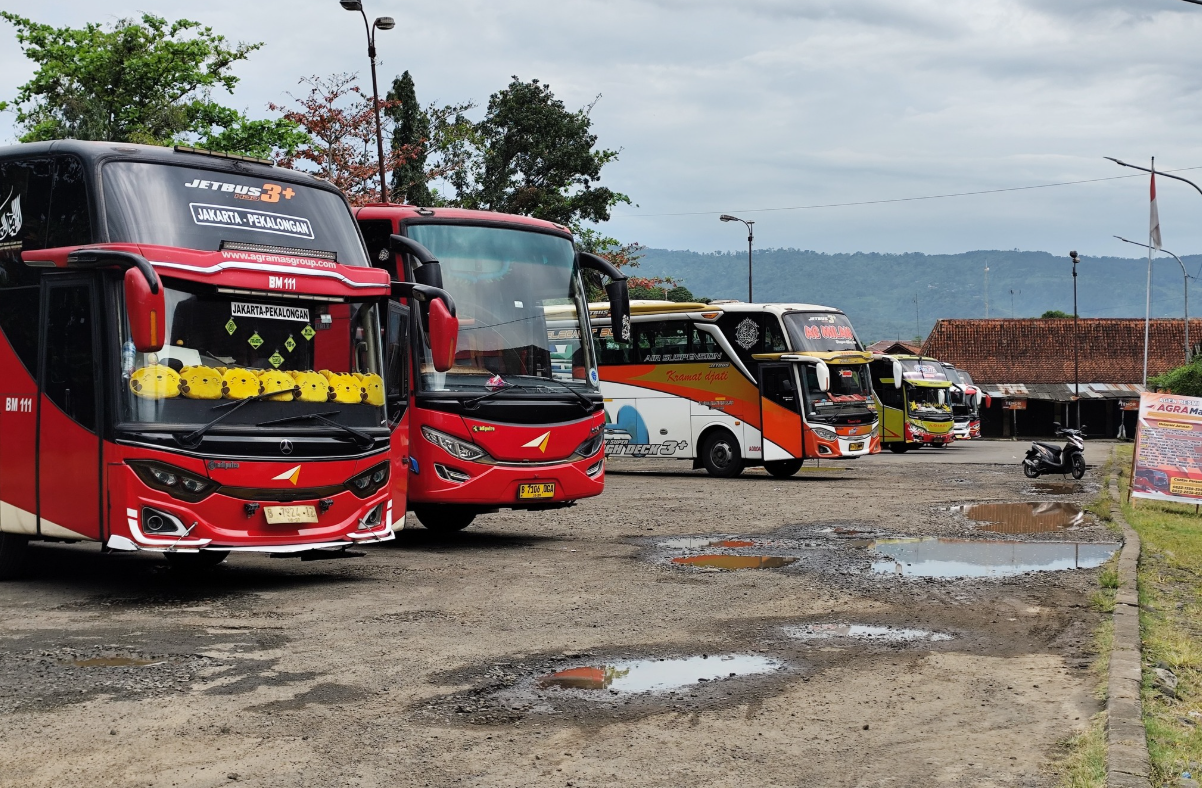
Bus company at Kajen Bus Terminal

For travelers who are going on an adventure in Pekalongan Regency, there are many modes of transportation, including bus or angkot. In Kajen there is a bus terminal which is quite large namely Kajen Main Terminal which serves the Jakarta - Pekalongan route. Buses serving these routes include Dewi Sri, Dedy Jaya, Sinar Jaya, Kurnia Jaya, Garuda Mas, Laju Prima, etc.

There is also the only station in Pekalongan Regency, namely Sragi Station. Unfortunately, this station does not serve passengers because its status is a small station. However, for those of you who choose the train transportation mode, you don't need to worry because there are still other alternative stations, namely Pekalongan Station located in Pekalongan City. This station is a class A station that serves the entire train journey (except Argo Anggrek Malam) both from Jakarta and Surabaya.

== Traditional foods ==
Pekalongan offers several traditional foods, such as:

=== Sego Megono (Megono Rice) ===
Sego Megono is rice with sliced young jackfruit and grated coconut. It is savory and spicy, it's usually served while still hot with an additional menu of fresh vegetables and fried fish. Sego megono is usually wrapped in teak leaves or banana leaves. Some people also call it "Sego Gori" (Jackfruit Rice).

=== Soto Tauto Pekalongan (Pekalongan Tauto Soup) ===
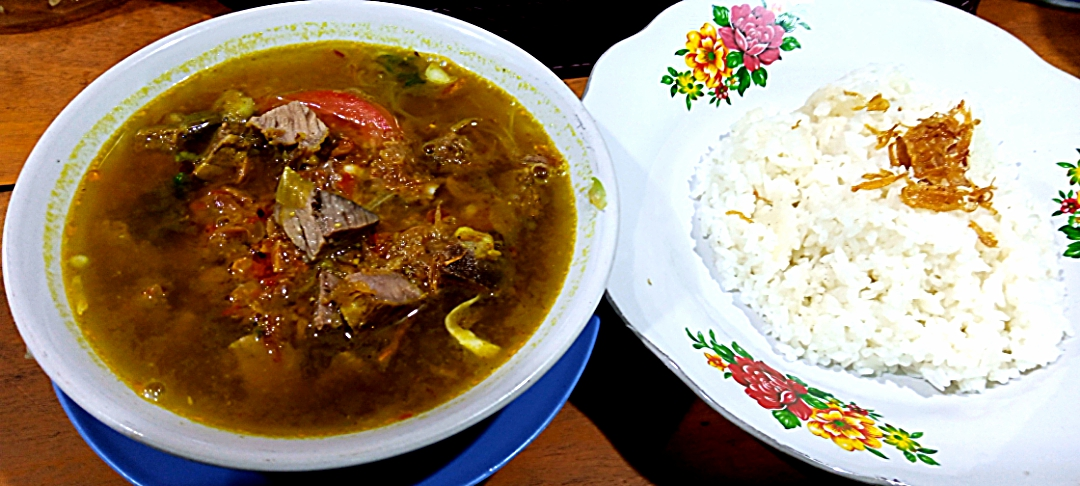
Tauto meat soup and rice

Soto tauto is a kind of meat soup with thick sauce made with tauto (fermented soy), buffalo meat and bowel.

=== Pindang Tetel ===
A kind of soup, where the seasoning sauce are processed with ripe pucung fruit.

=== Iwak Panggang (Smoked Fish) ===
This food is made of fish that is processed by smoking the fish, the fish will change its color, flavor and aroma. This food can be found in Pekalongan traditional markets.

=== Wajik Kletik ===
Wajik Kletik is some kind of cake with diamond shape made from glutinous rice plus brown sugar and grated coconut mixed together.

=== Kopi Tahlil ===
Kopi tahlil is made from a blend of pure coffee with spices like ginger, cardamom, cloves, cinnamon, pandanus leaves, lemongrass, and nutmeg.

=== Apem Kesesi ===
Apem kesesi is made from rice flour and palm/red sugar, the food was famous in pekalongan surrounding areas particularly in the western part up to the Comal, because it also markets to Comal traditional markets. Many people also recognize this food as Apem Comal.

=== Usek Krenyes ===
Is a typical food Paninggaran a type of cracker made from tapioca flour and fried using river sand which of course has also been cleaned. "Krenyes" in Indonesian is a spice up on the usek. There are two variants of taste, namely spicy and sweety.

=== Ondhol ===
Namely a kind of food typical of Paninggaran which is made from grated cassava.

=== Bothok Pecel ===
It's typical simple food from vegetables with corn and grated coconut. PECEL= grated spinach, winged bean, bean sprouts etc, mixed with chili sauce.

=== Kroco ===
Kroco is freswater snail boiled with natural spices and served with chili sauce, they are eaten with a small bamboo stick.

== Education ==
There are several colleges and academies in Pekalongan Regency.

- The State Institute for Islamic Study (IAIN) Pekalongan
- Muhammadiyah Polytechnic Pekalongan, Kajen
- College of Health Sciences (STIKES) Muhammadiyah Pekajangan
- Academy of Health Analysis (AAK) Pekalongan
- STIKAP (Islamic High School Kyai Ageng Pekalongan) YMI Wonopringgo Pekalongan
- Indonesia Open University (UPBJJ)
- UNIKAL (University of Pekalongan), Pekalongan.

=== Higher Education ===
- NU Pekalongan University
- Pekalongan State Islamic Institute (IAIN)
- Pekalongan University (UNIKAL) Pekalongan
- Kajen Community Community Academy (AKN)
- Muhammadiyah University Pekajangan Pekalongan (UMPP)
- Pekalongan Academy of Health Analysis (AAK)
- STIKAP (Kyai Ageng Islamic High School Pekalongan) YMI Wonopringgo Pekalongan
- UT Pekalongan Regency

=== Vocational High School ===
- State Vocational School Sragi, Kedungwuni, Lebakbarang, Karangdadap
- SMK Yapenda 01 Kedungwuni
- SMK Yapenda 02 Wiradesa Pekalongan
- Muhammadiyah Bligo Vocational School
- Muhammadiyah Bojong Vocational School
- SMK Muhamaduyah Kesesi
- SMK Muhamadiyah Kajen
- Kedungwuni Muhamadiyah Vocational School
- Muhammadiyah Karanganyar Vocational School
- Muhamadiyah Wiradesa Vocational School
- Muhammadiyah Talun Vocational School
- Muhamadiyah Doro Vocational School
- SMK Muhamadiyah Pencongan
- SMK Islamiyyah Sapugarut
- Bojong Islamic Vocational School
- Salakbrojo Kedungwuni Islamic Vocational School
- 45 Islamic High School Wiradesa
- Al-Fusha Kedungwuni Vocational School
- SMK Ar Rahman Watusalam
- Vocational School Ma'arif NU Tirto
- Vocational School Ma'arif NU Kajen
- SMK Ma'arif NU Kesesi
- Vocational School Ma'arif NU Doro
- Wira Bahari Wiradesa Vocational School
- Gondang Vocational School
- SMK Nurul Ummah Paninggaran
- SMK Diponegoro Karanganyar
- Vocational High School Siwalan Community Development
- Prima Kesesi Vocational School
- SMK NU Sragi
- SMK NU Kesesi

=== High school ===
- Public High School ( Bojong, Doro, Kajen, Kedungwuni, Kesesi, Kandangserang, Kesesi, Sragi, Paninggaran, Petungkriono, Talun, Wiradesa)
- Muhammadiyah I Pekajangan High School
- Muhammadiyah II Pekajangan High School
- SMA PGRI 1 Wiradesa
- SMA PGRI 2 Kajen
- Yapenda Karanganyar High School
- Doro Islamic High School
- YMI Wonopringgo Islamic High School
- Hasbullah Karanganyar Islamic High School
- MAN Pekalongan
- MA Ath-Thohiriyyah
- MA NU Karangdadap
- MA Salafiyah Simbangkulon Buaran
- MA Dr. Ibnu Mas'ud Wiradesa
- MA Muhammadiyah Pekajangan
- MA Hasbullah Karanganyar
- MA Nahdliyah Talun
- MA Salafiyah Syafiiyah Proto
- MA Yappi Kesesi
- MA Walisongo Kedungwuni
- MA Walisongo Pekajangan
- MA YMI Wonopringgo
- SMA N Wiradesa

=== Junior high school ===
- Middle School Bojong, Buaran, Doro, Kajen, Kesesi, Karangdadap, Kedungwuni, Kandangserang, Lebakbarang, Wiradesa, Tirto, Paninggaran, Petungkriyono, Sragi, Siwalan, Talun, Wonopringgo, Wonokerto, (2 State Junior High Schools in Each Sub-District)
- Pajomblangan NU Middle School
- Karangdadap NU Middle School
- Muhammadiyah Wiradesa Middle School, Bligo, Pekajangan, Wonopringgo, Kesesi
- Junior "NU" Kesesi, Kajen, Pajomblangan, Karangdadap
- YMI Wonopringgo Islamic Middle School
- Islamic Rembun Middle School, Simbang Wetan, Wonopringgo
- Walisongo Islamic Kedungwuni Middle School
- MTS Ath-Thohiriyyah
- MTS Muhammadiyah Pekajangan
- MTS Kajen Pekajangan
- MTS Gondang Wonopringgo, Pekalongan
- MTS "Kalijambe" Sragi
- MTsS Balanced kulon 1
- MTS Salafiyah Simbang Kulon 2, Buaran, Pekalongan
- MTs S Wonoyoso
- MTS YMI Wonopringgo Pekalongan
- MTS Al-Hikmah Tangkil Kulon, Kedungwuni, Pekalongan
- MTS Yapik Kutosari, Karanganyar, Pekalongan
- MTS Salafiyah Kadipaten, Wiradesa, Pekalongan
- MTS Al-Hikmah Proto, Kedungwuni, Pekalongan
- MTS Salafiyyah Paninggaran, Pekalongan.
- MTs Negeri 2 Pekalongan

== Health facilities ==
There are several health facilities in Pekalongan Regency.

- Pekajangan Islamic Hospital (RSI) in Ambokembang, Kedungwuni District
- Kajen General Hospital (RSU) in Karanganyar District
- Kraton General Hospital (RSU) in Pekalongan

== Natives ==
- Adi Kurdi, Indonesian actor
- Dharsono Hartono Rekso, 1st ASEAN Secretary General
- Abdul Hakim Garuda Nusantara, lawyer, human rights defender
- Zainal Abidin Domba, Indonesian actor
- Rudy Hadisuwarno, professional hairdresser
- Beb Bakhuys, Dutch footballer
- Joe Hin Tjio, scientist
- Asip Kholbihi, Regent of Pekalongan Regency (2015–2020)

== Dialects ==
Pekalongan people have their own dialect. The dialects usually ending an order sentence with the word "ra". For example: "ojo koyo kui ra" (don't be like that). On the southern regency the dialect differs a little, where most possibility sentence is followed by the word "ndean", other typical southern pekalongan dialect is the use of word Cok-e which means "maybe". Some example are: "wis mangan, ndean!? wis mangan, cok-e!?" ("have he eat? maybe he has?"). There are other typical dialect like the use of the word "pak ora si" which means "It doesn't matter".

== People ==
- Abdul Rahman Saleh, advocate, actor, former Supreme Court judge, former Attorney General, former Indonesian Ambassador to the Kingdom of Denmark
- Adi Kurdi, actor (film player, Cemara Family)
- Hartono Rekso Dharsono, ASEAN Secretary General 1
- Abdul Hakim Garuda Nusantara, lawyer, human rights activist
- Zainal Abidin Domba, actor
- Rudy Hadisuwarno, a professional hairdresser
- Fadia A. Rafiq, singer and deputy regent of Pekalongan Regency
- Beb Bakhuys, former football player soccer and coach from Netherlands
- Joe Hin Tjio, the discoverer of human chromosomes number 23
- R.T.A Milono, first Central Kalimantan governor and former East Java governor

== See also ==
- Kedungwuni
