= List of presidential palaces in Indonesia =

List of palaces that are used as the official residences of the President of Indonesia.

Name	Images	Location	Construction started	Architectural style	Remarks
Bogor Palace; Istana Bogor ᮄ᮪ᮒᮔ ᮘᮧᮌᮧᮁ Paleis te Buitenzorg		Bogor, West Java; 6.5980°S 106.7973°E	1744	Indies Empire	The original colonial building on the site of Istana Bogor was a mansion named Buitenzorg (also Sanssouci, meaning without a care in Dutch), which dates back to 1745 as a country retreat for the Dutch governors-general to escape the heat and diseases of Batavia.
Cipanas Palace; Istana Cipanas ᮄ᮪ᮒᮔ ᮎᮤᮕᮔᮞ᮪ Tjipanas Paleis		Cianjur Regency, West Java; 6.7336°S 107.0412°E	1740	Dutch Colonial Revival	The palatial residence was erected by a Dutch landlord named Van Heuts in 1740 during the rule of Governor-General Gustaaf Willem van Imhoff. The area's reputation was for clean, fresh and cool mountain air and the building was made into a resort for Dutch governors-general.
Garuda Palace; Istana Garuda		Nusantara, Kalimantan; 0.9606°S 116.6937°E	2022	Indonesian	Official residence of the president of Indonesia
Gedung Agung; Gedung Agung ꦒꦣꦸꦁꦲꦒꦸꦁ		Yogyakarta, Special Region of Yogyakarta; 7.8002°S 110.3643°E	1869	Indies Empire	It was initially built in 1824 on an estate owned by the 18th Dutch resident of Yogyakarta, Anthonie Hendriks Smissaert. The first building was designed by an architect named A. Payen, with typical Indies tropical architecture design. The construction of the building was delayed by the ongoing Java War, a rebellion led by Diponegoro and was only completed in 1832.
Istana Negara; Istana Negara; Paleis te Rijswijk		Central Jakarta, Jakarta; 6.1702°S 106.8242°E	1796	Neoclassical, Indies Empire	The building today known as Istana Negara (State Palace) was originally built as the residence for a Dutch businessman, J. A. van Braam in Rijswijk-Molenvliet (presently known as Harmoni).
Merdeka Palace; Istana Merdeka; Paleis te Koningsplein		Central Jakarta, Jakarta; 6.1702°S 106.8242°E	1873	Neoclassical, Indies Empire	The history of the Merdeka Palace starts with the mansion of merchant Jacob Andries van Braam, built in Rijswijk (today known as Harmonie) in 1804.
Tampaksiring Palace; Istana Tampaksiring ᬧᬸᬭᬶ ᬢᬫᬄᬧᬓᬄᬲᬶᬭᬶᬂ		Gianyar Regency, Bali; 8.4390°S 115.3104°E	1957	Modern, Balinese	Tampaksiring Palace was built after the independence of Indonesia.
