= Taman Sari (Yogyakarta) =

Former royal garden in Yogakarta, Indonesia

Taman Sari Water Castle
- Taman Sari ꦠꦩꦤ꧀ꦱꦫꦶ
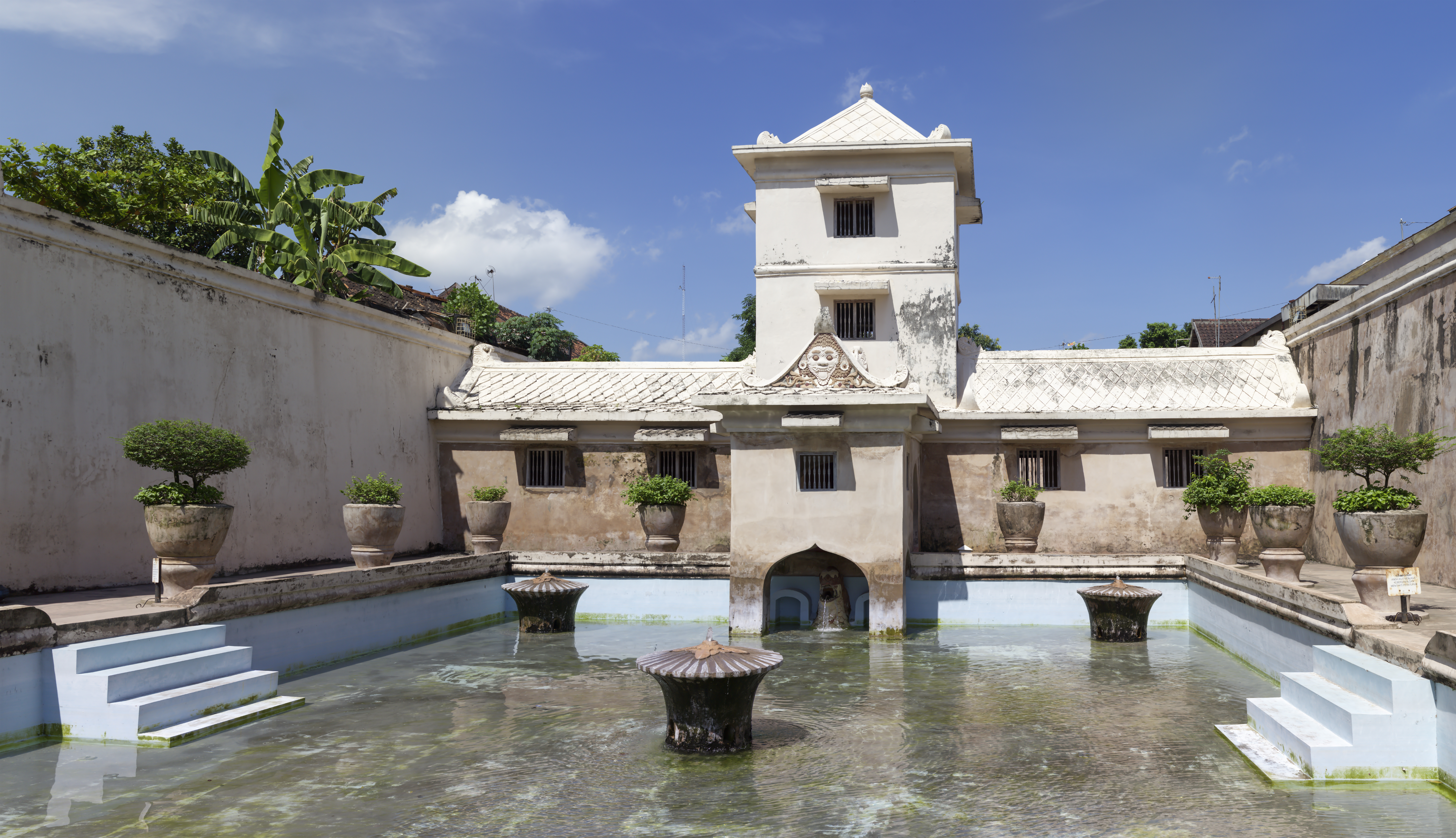
- The Umbul Pasiraman bathing complex of Taman Sari

- Location in Yogyakarta

General information
- Type: Royal Palace
- Architectural style: Javanese
- Location: Jl. Ngasem, Yogyakarta, Indonesia
- Coordinates: 7.810151°S 110.358946°E
- Construction started: 1758
- Completed: 1765/9
- Client: House of Hamengkubuwono
- Owner: Yogyakarta Sultanate

Technical details
- Structural system: Water Castle

Design and construction
- Architects: Tumenggung Mangundipura, Demang Tegis (legendary)

The Cosmological Axis of Yogyakarta and its Historic Landmarks
UNESCO World Heritage Site
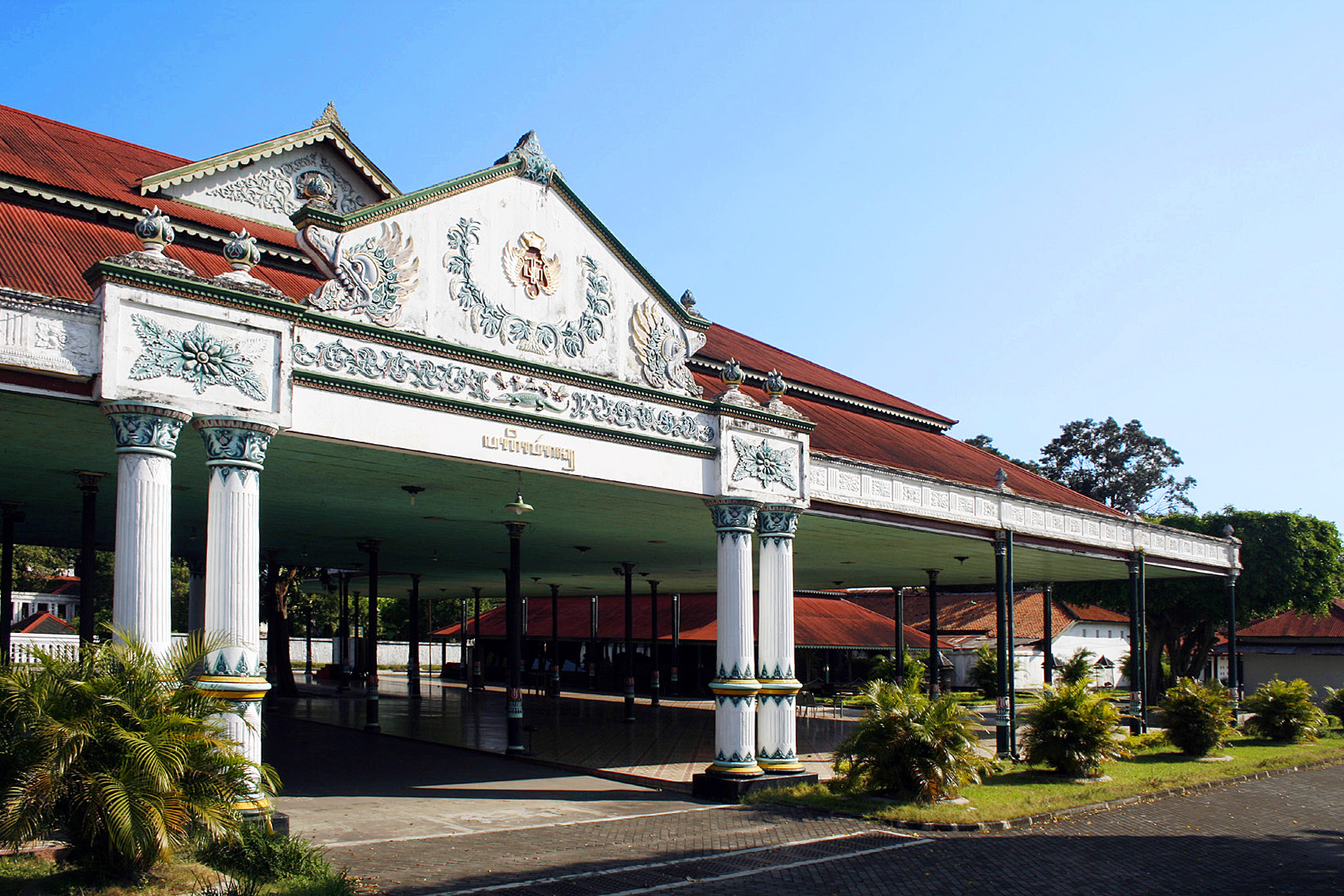
- Pagelaran hall of Kraton Yogyakarta
- Interactive map of The Cosmological Axis of Yogyakarta and its Historic Landmarks
- Criteria: Cultural: ii, iii
- Reference: 1671
- Inscription: 2023 (45th Session)

Taman Sari Water Castle, also known as Taman Sari (Javanese: ꦠꦩꦤ꧀ꦱꦫꦶ), is the site of a former royal garden of the Sultanate of Yogyakarta. It is located about 2 km south within the grounds of the Kraton, Yogyakarta, Indonesia. Built in the mid-18th century, the Taman Sari had multiple functions, such as a resting area, a workshop, a meditation area, a defense area, and a hiding place.

Taman Sari consisted of four distinct areas: a large artificial lake with islands and pavilions located in the west, a bathing complex in the centre, a complex of pavilions and pools in the south, and a smaller lake in the east. Today only the central bathing complex is well preserved, while the other areas have been largely occupied by the Kampung Taman settlement.

Since 2017, the Historical City Centre of Yogyakarta including Taman Sari has been listed as a tentative World Heritage Site.

== Etymology ==
The name Taman Sari comes from the Javanese words taman, meaning a 'garden' or 'park' and sari, which means 'beautiful' or 'flowers'. Hence, the name Taman Sari means an area of a beautiful garden adorned with flowers. An old article described it as a "water castle" (Dutch: waterkasteel); as by shutting the watergates, the complex would be completely immersed in water, leaving tall structures standing out.

== History ==
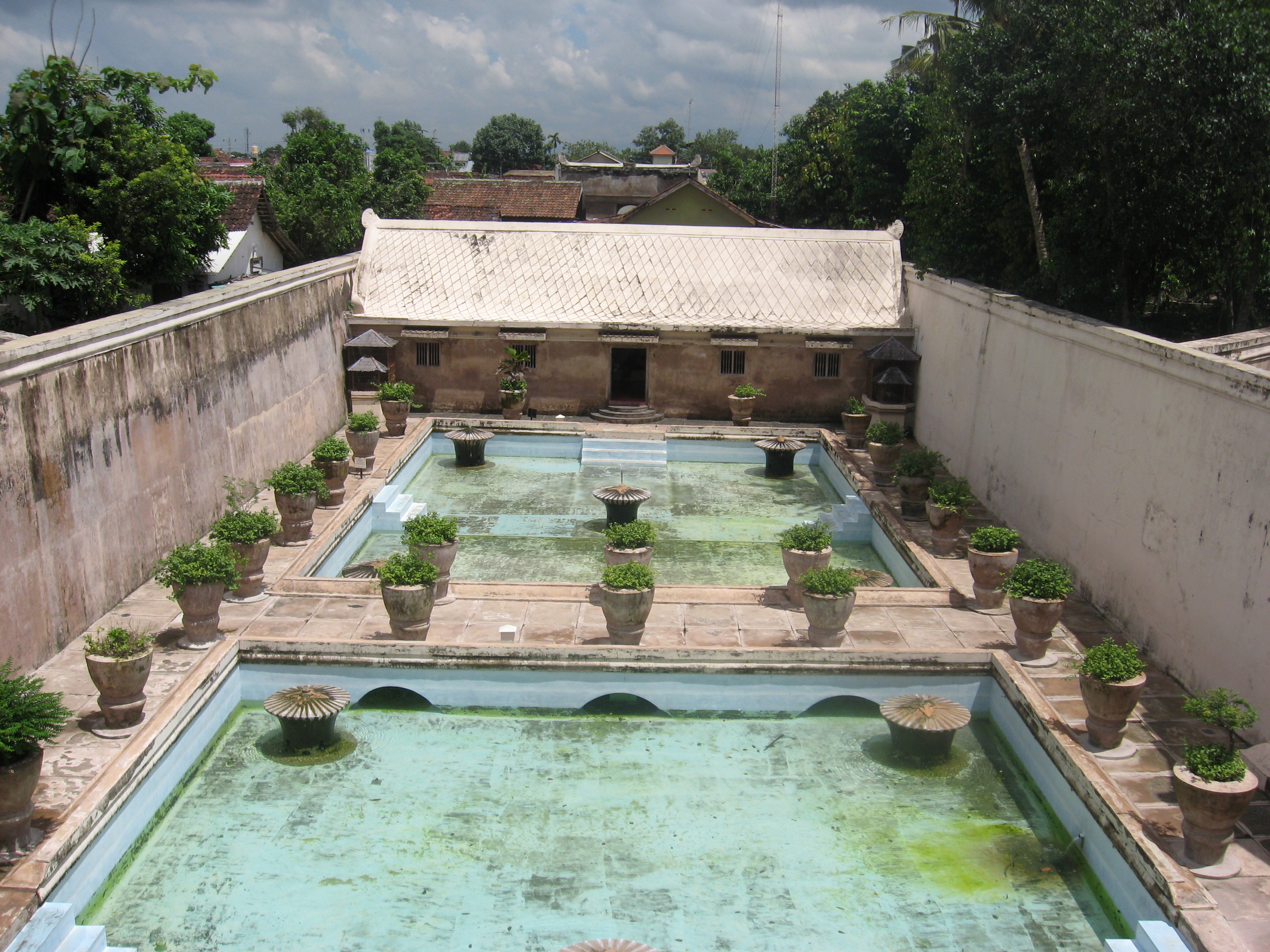
The bathing area where the concubines would bathe while waiting for the sultan to choose one.

The building of Taman Sari commenced during the reign of Sultan Hamengkubuwono I (1755–1792), the first sultan of the Yogyakarta Sultanate, and was completed by the time of Sultan Hamengkubuwono II. The building site, however, had already been known as a bathing place called Pacethokan Spring since Sunan Amangkurat IV’s reign (1719–1726). According to Kitab Mamana in Yogyakarta Kraton, the project leader for the construction of Taman Sari was Tumenggung Mangundipura. He had travelled twice to Batavia to learn about European architecture, which is the reason why the architecture of Taman Sari has marks of European style. Taman Sari was built three years after the Giyanti Agreement as a resting place for Sultan Hamengkubuwono I. The complex consists of about 59 buildings including a mosque, meditation chambers, swimming pools, and a series of 18 water gardens and pavilions surrounded by artificial lakes. The complex was effectively used between 1765 and 1812.

The Regent of Madiun, Raden Rangga Prawirasentika, participated in funding the construction of Taman Sari. Prawirasentika also beseeched the Sultan to be relieved of Madiun's tax obligation. He offered other alternative ways of payment. The Sultan accepted his proposal. In 1758, the Sultan commanded the Regent to supervise the making of bricks and various complements, which would be used to build a beautiful garden. The sultan wanted a place where he could spend some time to relax after many years of wars that he had just experienced. Raden Tumenggung Mangundipura, under supervision of Raden Arya Natakusuma (who later became Sri Pakualam II), was responsible for the construction. The building was started in 1684 Javanese year (1758 AD). After finding out how large the complex was, Raden Rangga Prawirasentika realized that the cost would have been greater than the taxes. He resigned from the project and was replaced by Prince Natakusuma who continued the project to completion.

The British invasion of the Yogyakarta Kraton saw considerable parts of the complex destroyed in 1812.

The building of Taman Sari ended upon the completion of the gates and the walls. A sengkalan memet (a Javanese chronogram) on the western gate (Gedhong Gapura Hageng) marks the year with the Javanese words Lajering Kembang Sinesep Peksi, denoting the Javanese year of 1691 or about 1765: lajering, 'core' for 1; kembang, 'flower' for 9; sinerep, 'suck' or 'drink' for 6; peksi, 'bird' for 1; the sentence can be read as "birds gathering nectar of the flower". The relief around this sengkalan memet shows birds siphoning honey from flowery trees.

The maintenance of Taman Sari was abandoned shortly after Hamengkubuwono I died, partly because the elaborate hydraulic works were so difficult to maintain. The gardens were neglected and the buildings suffered some damage during the Java War of 1825–1830.

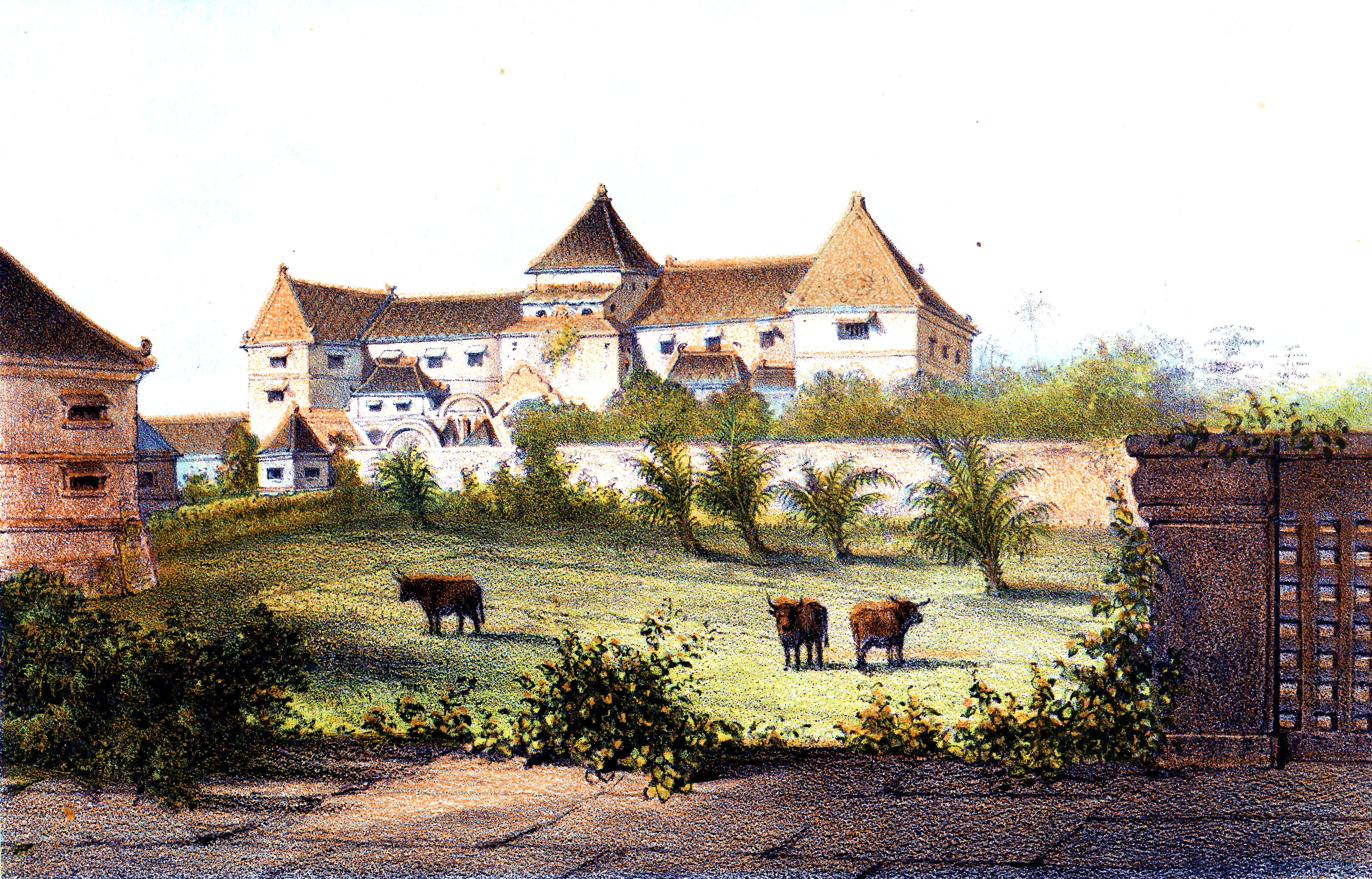
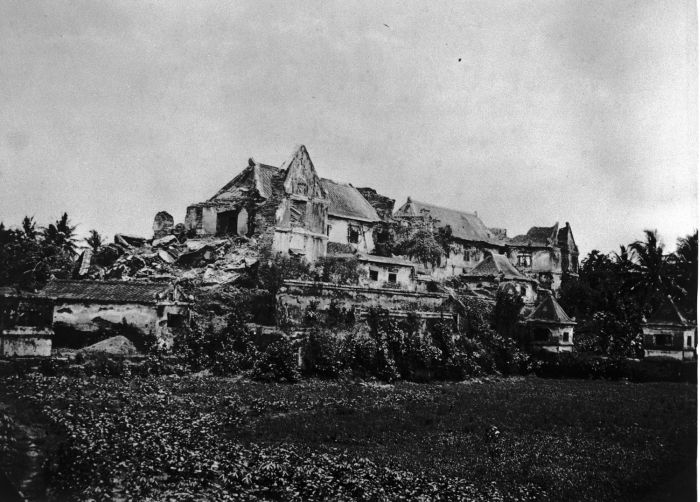
A 19th century pictures showing the Kenongo building before and after the 1867 earthquake. The surrounding area, once the Segaran lake, has dried out and filled with plants. Today the lake bed is settled with squatter buildings and the Kenongo building is still in ruin.

The palace complex fell out of use following an earthquake in 1867, which destroyed several buildings and drained the water features. Over time, squatters began to inhabit the site, surrounding the ruins of the deserted pavilions and filling the empty lakebeds.

In early 1970s, effort at restoration was made. Only the bathing complex has been completely restored.

=== Demang Tegis ===
The manuscript of Serat Rerenggan mentions the story of Demang Tegis, a Portuguese man said to be one of the architect of Taman Sari. According to the manuscript, a strange man suddenly appeared in Mancingan Village (a locality name on the south coast of Java near Parangtritis). With long nose, white complexion, and a foreign language, the villagers suspected that the person was some kind of spirit or forest fairy. They presented him to the current sultan, Hamengkubuwono II. Apparently the sultan found interest in the person and took the strange man as his servant. Some years had passed and the man had finally learned to talk in Javanese. According to him, he was Portuguese (or in Javanese, Portegis) who was stranded from a shipwreck. He also claimed to have been a housebuilder, so the sultan ordered him to erect a fortress. Satisfied by the man's work, the sultan gave him the title demang. From then on that person was known as Demang Portegis or Demang Tegis.

There is a controversy whether Demang Tegis was actually the architect of Taman Sari, as the design resembles a hybrid of Javanese and Dutch styles, rather than Portuguese. In light of this, P.J. Veth commented:

Local research says that [Taman Sari's architecture] was designed by either a Spanish or Portuguese engineer, who was stranded off his sunken ship at the southern beach. However, [the architecture] that strongly shows Javanese character contradicts this.

The evidence about Demang Tegis remains an inconclusive, yet the architecture of Taman Sari moved a number of Portuguese experts on architecture and cultural heritage to examine the Taman Sari in 2001.

The widespread assumption of European influence in the design of Taman Sari has been also challenged by the research of Hélène Njoto-Feillard from the University of Pantheon-Sorbonne, presented in a 2003 conference paper. Analysing the historic context and architectural style of the complex, the conclusion is that the creators are most likely local Javanese. The absence of any mention of European involvement in the construction of Taman Sari in Dutch historic descriptions is presented as further evidence in support of this hypothesis.

== Buildings ==
Taman Sari can be divided into four areas. The first area is the artificial lake Segaran located in the west. The second area is a bathing complex in the south of the Segaran lake, called the Umbul Binangun bathing complex. The third area, now completely gone, is the Pasarean Ledok Sari and Garjitawati Pool, located in the south of the bathing complex. The fourth area is the east side of the first and second area, which extend far to the east and to the southeast complex of Magangan.

=== Segaran lake area ===
The Segaran lake area was the main complex of the Taman Sari during its era. This complex consisted of a man-made lake called Segaran ('artificial sea') with some buildings located on artificial islands in the middle of a lake. The buildings are connected by an underwater tunnel. It was used as the starting point for the royal family to reach the Taman Sari pools via a vessel. Today, the Segaran lake cannot be seen any longer as the water had been drained and the lake bed is now filled with human settlements. The underwater tunnel, which is now underground after the water had gone, still exists and can be accessed.

In the middle of Segaran was an artificial island known as Kenongo Island (Javanese: Pulo Kenongo). It was named after the cananga trees which once covered the island. On this island is a one-storeyed structure called the Kenongo building (Javanese: Gedhong Kenongo), now in ruins.

On the south side of Kenongo Island is a row of small buildings called the Tajug. These buildings were originally used as air vents for the tunnel located below the lake. This tunnel, constructed in 1761,was an alternative way to reach the Kenongo Island other than by a vessel. Also on the south side of the Kenongo Island is another artificial island called Cemethi Island (Javanese: Pulo Cemethi) or Panembung Island (Javanese: Pulo Panembung). It is a one-storeyed structure for the Sultan to meditate, or some said, a hiding place for the royal family during an attack. Another name for this island is Sumur Gumantung, because on the south side of this island is a well that hangs above the ground. This place could only be reached via the underwater tunnel. The building of Cemethi Island is now also in ruin.

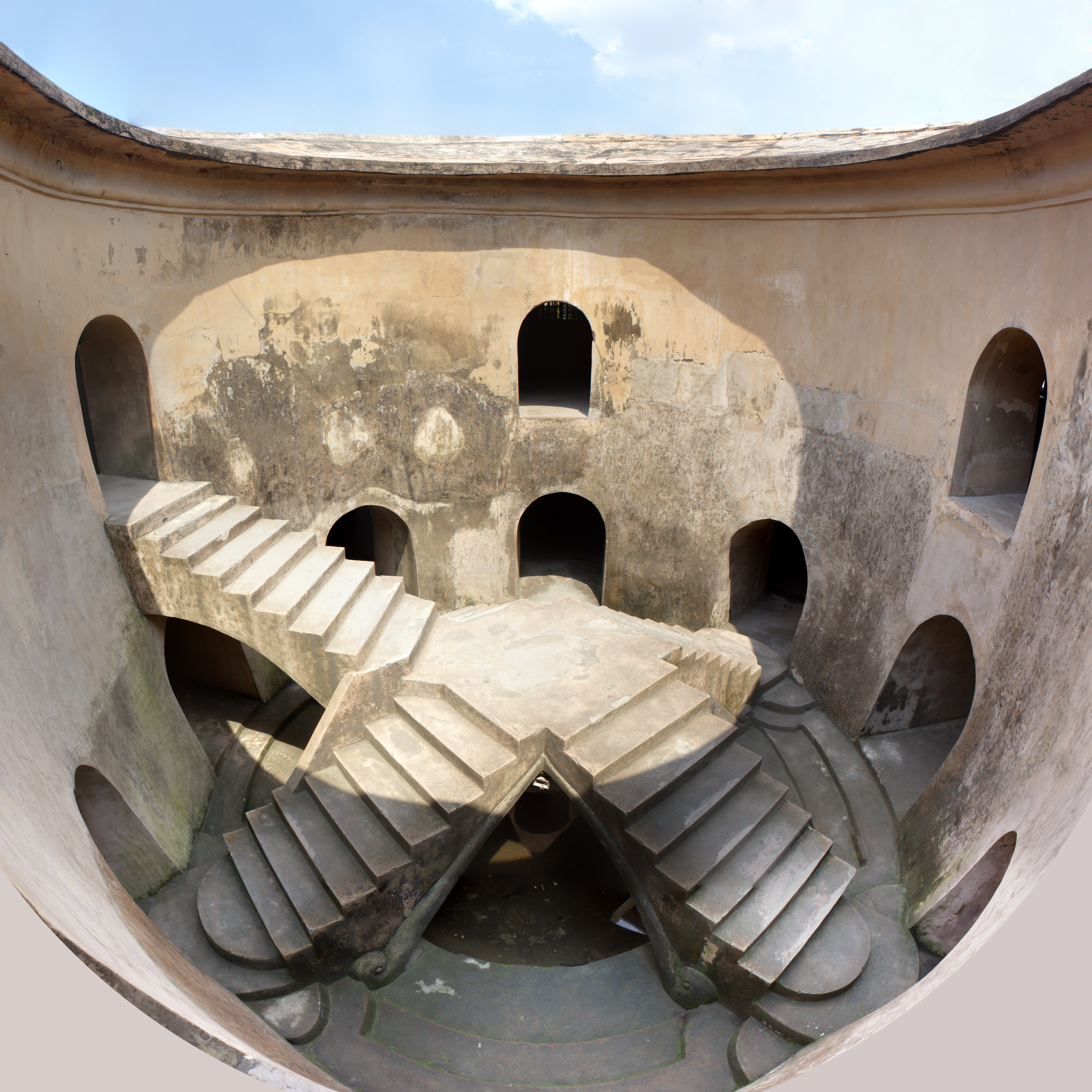
The elevated platform inside Sumur Gumuling where the four staircases meet in the center

On the west side of Kenongo Island is another one-storeyed circular structure that forms another artificial island in the past called Gumuling Well (Sumur Gumuling). These one-storeyed building can only be entered via the underwater tunnel. The building was used as a mosque. A niche in the wall of this building was used as a mihrab. The central area of this building is an elevated platform where four staircases meet, and then from the platform, one staircase reach the first floor. On the ground level of this platform is a small pool that was used for Muslim ritual ablution.

=== Bathing complex ===
The second area is located on the south of the former artificial lake of Segaran. Even though this area was not the focal point of Taman Sari, it is the best preserved area in the complex and is currently the most popular tourist attraction. The area is accessed via two gates on the east and the west side, each of these gates leads to the center of the complex, first to an inner octagonal-shaped courtyard on the east and the west, and then each of these courtyards leads to a central bathing complex in the center.

==== Gates ====
The two gates into the Taman Sari bathing complex: west (top) and east

There are two gates that lead to the bathing complex, the western one called Gedhong Gapura Hageng and the eastern one called Gedhong Gapura Panggung. Both gates are decorated with ornaments of stylized birds and flowering foliages.

The west entrance, the Gedhong Gapura Hageng, was formerly used as the main entrance to the bathing complex. The east facade of the gate is still visible today, but the west facade is blocked by settlements. The construction of this gate was finished in 1691 Javanese Year (about 1765 AD). The east entrance, the Gedhong Gapura Panggung, is still functioning as a gate and is now the main entrance for tourists. The east entrance is a building with four staircases, two on the west side and two on the east side. Four nagas once decorated this gate, now there are only two nagas left. The building was finished in 1684 according to the Javanese calendar (about 1758 AD).

==== Octagonal courtyards ====
Each of the gates leads to an octagonal-shaped courtyard. The western gate leads to a western octagonal-shaped enclosed courtyard. In the past, a building stood in the center of this courtyard, which was called the Lopak-lopak building (Javanese: Gedhong Lopak-lopak).

The eastern gate leads to an octagonal-shaped enclosed courtyard as well. It has a similar layout to the Gedhong Lopak-lopak courtyard, but within it, there are four pavilions known as Gedhong Sekawan. These pavilions were used as the resting place for the royal family.

The eastern and the western octagonal courtyards lead to the central bathing complex.

==== Umbul Pasiraman bathing complex ====
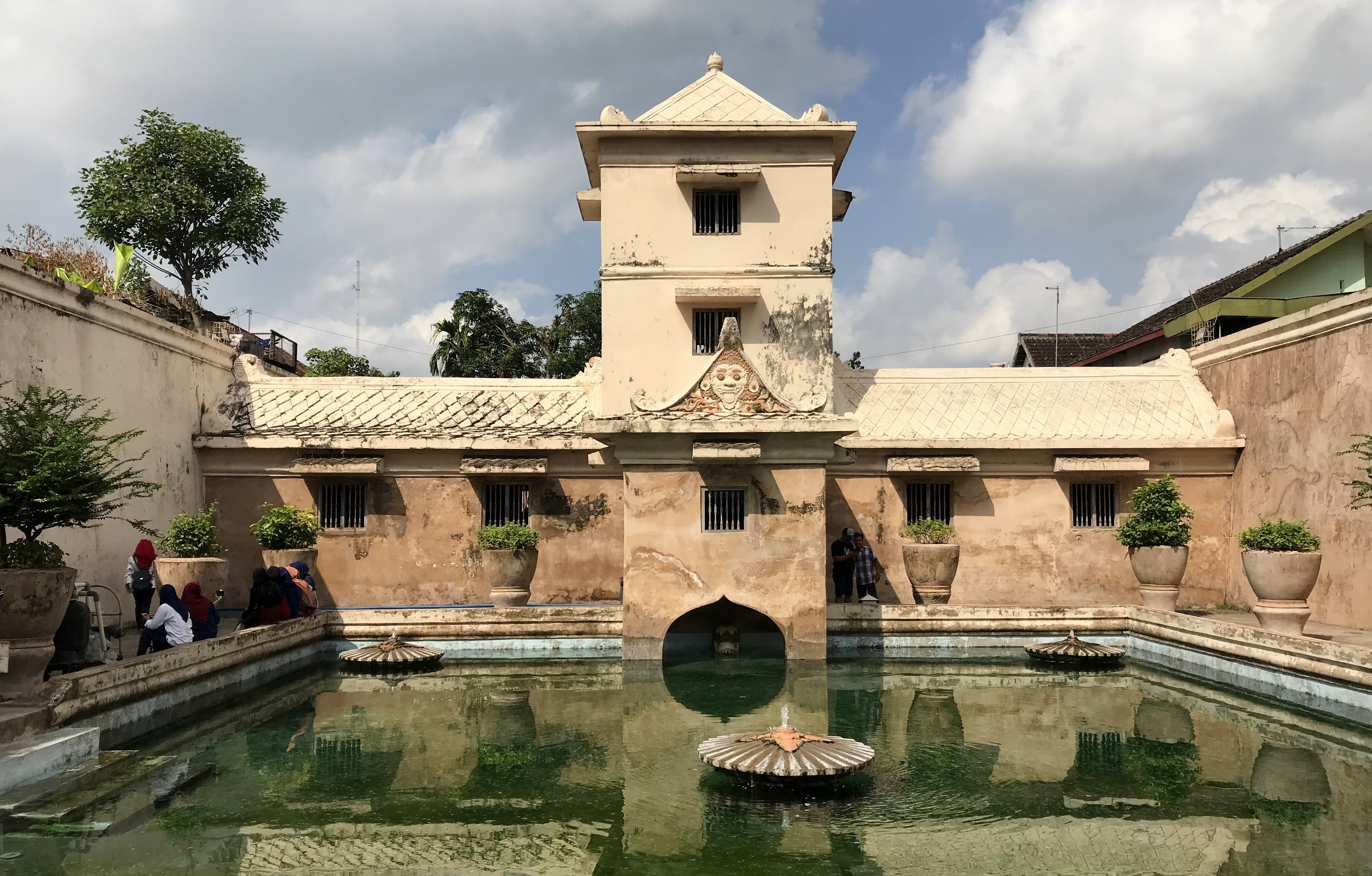
Part of the Umbul Pasiraman bathing complex, showing the tower from which the sultan observed the bathing women

Umbul Pasiraman, also known as Umbul Binangun or Umbul Winangun, is a bathing complex for the royal family. The bathing complex is an enclosed space surrounded by tall structures. It consists of three pools decorated with mushroom-shaped springs and large flower pots.

There are two buildings in the bathing complex. The northernmost building was used as the resting place and changing room for the daughters and concubines of the sultan. On the south side of this building is a pool known as Umbul Muncar. The pool is divided into two by a central pathway (known as Blumbang Kuras) that runs east–west. The next building on the south is a building with a tower in its center. The right wing of the building was used as the sultan's changing room, the east wing was used as his resting place. The central tower was used by the sultan to observe his daughters and concubines bathing in the pool.

On the south of this building is the third pool that was used only by the sultan and his concubines. During its era, only females and the sultan were allowed to enter this bathing complex.

==== Gedhong Temanten ====
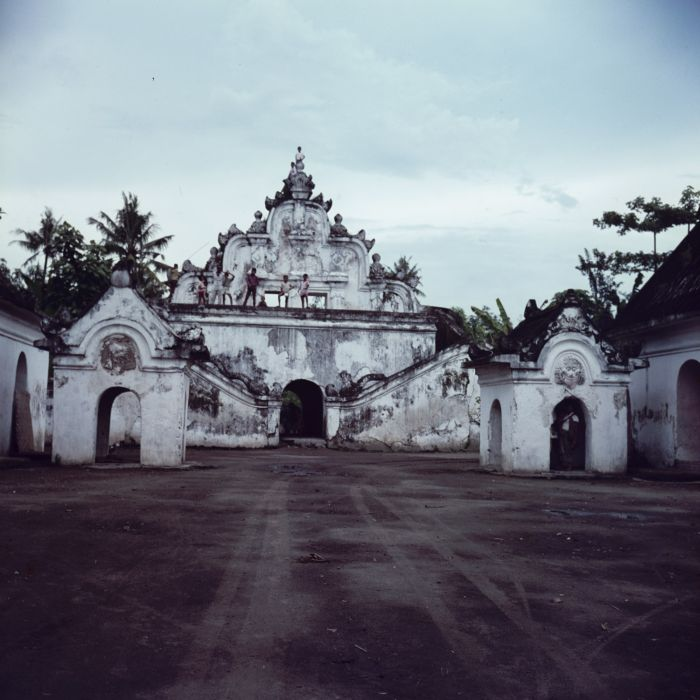
Gedhong Temanten buildings. In the background is the eastern gate, Gedhong Gapuro Panggung

On the southeast and northeast of the Gedhong Gapuro Panggung are two buildings known as Gedhong Temanten. The buildings were formerly used by the castle guard. According to archeological study, on the south side of this building was another building and a garden whose remain cannot be seen anymore and is filled with settlements.

=== Third area ===
This area that is located south of the bathing complex, but no visible remains are left. According to a reconstruction of the site, this complex consisted of the complex of Pasarean Dalem Ledok Sari and the pool complex of Garjitawati with several pavilions and a garden. Pasarean Dalem Ledok Sari is the only part of the complex that is still protected. Pasarean Dalem Ledok Sari was probably used as a meditation place for the sultan, or some said as the meeting place for the sultan and his concubines. In the middle of the building was also a sleeping room for the sultan with water flowing beneath it. There was also a kitchen, a looming room, a storage, two pools for the servants, and a garden.

=== Fourth area ===
The fourth complex is the part of the Taman Sari complex that is practically has no visible remains, except for a former hanging bridge and remains of a pier. The description of this area is retrieved from a reconstruction made from the 1812 English army sketch of the Yogyakarta kraton. This area extends about 600 meters to the east of the Segaran lake area. This area consisted of another artificial lake on the southeast of the Magangan complex toward the northeast of Siti Hinggil Kidul complex. In the middle of this artificial lake is another artificial island called Kinupeng Island (Javanese: Pulo Kinupeng). A building, known as Gading building (Javanese: Gedhong Gading) stood in the middle of the island.

This artificial lake is connected to the east side of the Segaran Lake via a 380-meter long canal that runs east to west. The canal was about 20 meter wide and there are two bottlenecks that are thought to be the place where a hanging bridge once stood. One of the bridge is now located in the street that connects the kraton complex of Magangan with the Kamandhungan Kidul. The layout of the bridge can still be recognized, although the bridge itself has gone. On the west side of the hanging bridge is a pier that was used by the sultan as his starting point for his journey to the Taman Sari pool on his royal vessel.

The canal is bounded on the south and north with a garden, now located on the west side of the kraton complex of Kamanghungan Kidul and Siti Hinggil Kidul. Today, all of these canals, bridges, lakes, and gardens have been filled with local settlements; the garden becomes the Kampung Ngadisuryan, the lake becomes the kampung Segaran.

== Around Taman Sari ==
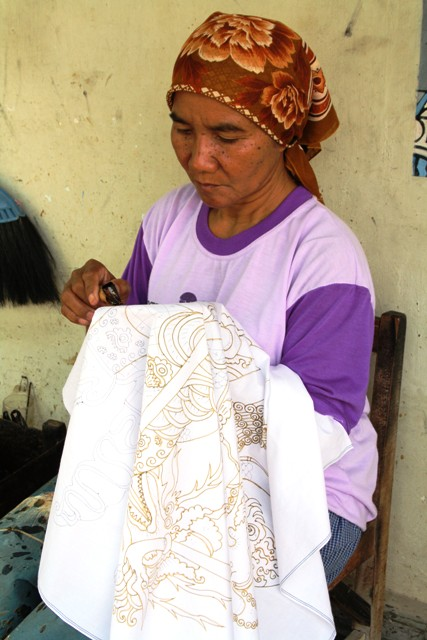
2010 Photo of female Batik painter living around Taman Sari (Kampung Taman) crafting batik.

Today, the area around the Taman Sari castle complex is occupied by a settlement called Kampung Taman with 2,700 residents. The community is known for their batik and traditional painting craft traditions. Also located in this area is the Ngasem Traditional Market (Pasar Ngasem), which hosted the biggest bird market in Yogyakarta for a long time (until the bird market was relocated to PASTY on Jl. Bantul in 2010), and the Sokotunggal mosque, a unique mosque built in the early 20th century with a single pillar that is different from the usual Javanese traditional architecture.

== Notable visitors ==
- King Charles III, King of Britain
- Malia and Sasha Obama, Daughters of former US President
- Mark Zuckerberg, CEO of Meta
- Tharman Shanmugaratnam, President of Singapore
- Queen Maxima and King Willem-Alexander, Royals of the Netherlands

== See also ==
- Fort Vredeburg
- Gedung Agung
