= Battle of Fort Vredeburg =

Coordinates: 7°48′01″S 110°21′58″E

- Part of Java War
Date	June 1825
Location	Fort Vredeburg
Result	Javanese victory

Belligerents
Netherlands	Diponegoro forces

Commanders and leaders
Unknown	Diponegoro

Strength
Unknown	Unknown

Casualties and losses
200 soldier killed	Few wounded

The Battle of Fort Vredeburg was an 1825 conflict at Fort Vredeburg, Yogyakarta, between Prince Diponegoro and the Dutch East Indies. Diponegoro's forces captured the fort and killed 200 Dutch soldiers.

== Events ==
Diponegoro's forces wanted to attack Fort Vredeburg because of its strategic location and its use by the Dutch as their headquarters in Siege of Yogyakarta.

In June 1825, Prince Diponegoro's forces attacked Fort Vredeburg. They captured it and killed 200 Dutch soldiers.
