= Tampaksiring Palace =

Building in Bali, Indonesia

Coordinates: 8.4156°S 115.3124°E

- Istana Tampaksiring
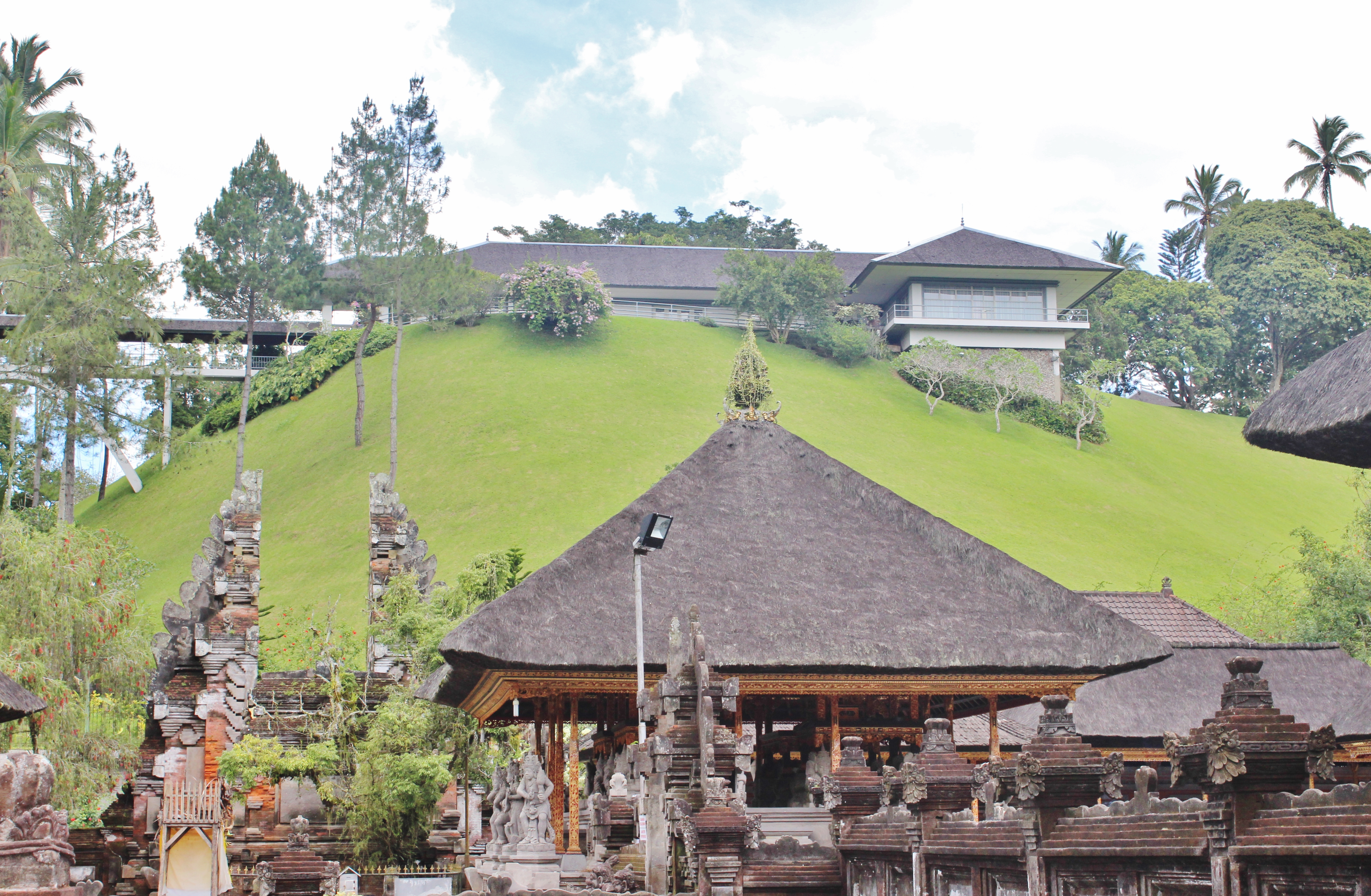
- Istana Tampaksiring, on a hill overlooking Pura Tirta Empul
- Interactive map of the Tampaksiring Palace area

General information
- Architectural style: Modernism combined with Balinese architecture
- Location: Jalan Tampaksiring, Manukaya, Tampaksiring; Gianyar Regency, Bali 80552, Indonesia
- Construction started: 1957-1963
- Client: Republic of Indonesia

Design and construction
- Architect: R.M. Soedarsono

The Tampaksiring Palace (Indonesian: Istana Tampaksiring) is one of 7 Presidential Palaces of Indonesia, it is located in Tampaksiring, Gianyar Regency, Bali. Built in 1957 and finished in 1963, unlike other presidential palaces of Indonesia that mostly were inherited from the colonial period of Dutch East Indies, Istana Tampaksiring was built after the independence of Indonesia, and built not in colonial Indies Empire style, but in modernism combined with elements of Balinese architecture.

The buildings of the complex are scattered around on an area covering 19 hectare. The main palace building are built on a higher ground overlooking Tampaksiring Tirta Empul Temple and Mount Agung.

== History ==
The idea to construct a new Indonesian Presidential Palace was initiated by Indonesia's first president, Sukarno. In the mid 1950s, as the newly independent state, Sukarno wished to showcase Indonesian culture to visiting state guests, and the fame of Bali as a cultural and natural attraction. The construction was prompted by the need to provide the lodging or villa befitting very important person, state guest, royalties, heads of state or heads of government during their stay in Bali.

Previously in the location stood a guesthouse belongs to the king of Gianyar. The guestshouse was often used by visiting foreign dignitaries, guests and officials of East Indies. Sukarno visited the location several times in 1955, learning Sukarno's interest, the King of Gianyar gave the land and building to the Government of Indonesia. In 1957 Sukarno appointed R.M. Soedarsono to design a new palace and the preparation commenced, thus the old guesthouse of Gianyar's King was demolished. The construction stated in 1957 and finished in 1963.

== See also ==
- Bogor Palace, main residence of the Governor-General and another Presidential Palace.
- Cipanas Palace
- Gedung Agung
- Vice Presidential Palace (Indonesia)
- Official residence

== Gallery ==
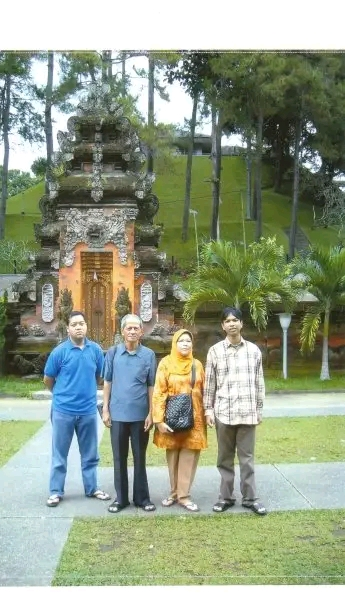
Tampaksiring Palace in 2008

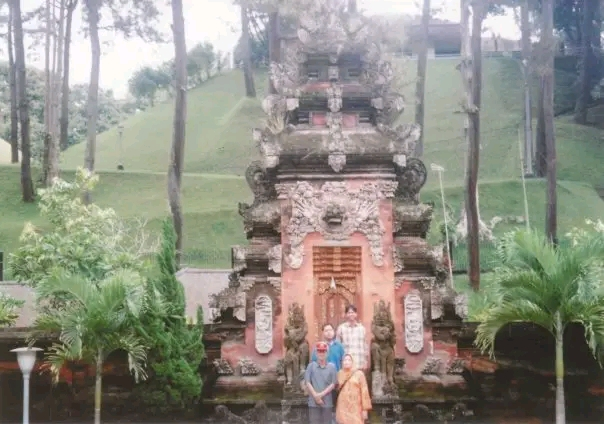
Tampaksiring Palace in 2000s

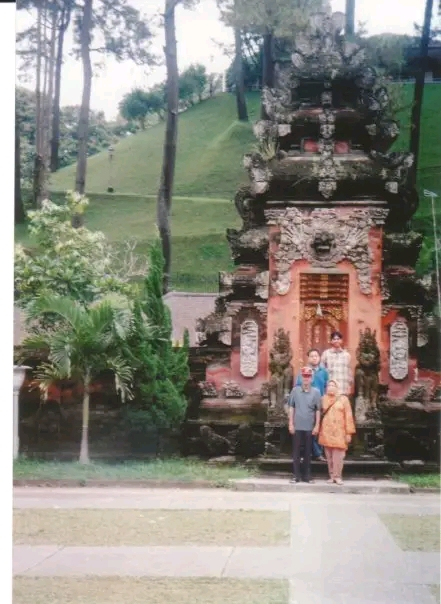
Tampaksiring Palace in the era of Susilo Bambang Yudhoyono President
