= Istana Negara =

Istana Negara (meaning "State Palace" in Malay/Indonesian language) may refer to:

- Istana Negara, Nusantara, Indonesia
- Istana Negara, Jakarta, Indonesia
- Istana Negara, Jalan Tuanku Abdul Halim, Kuala Lumpur, Malaysia - National Palace of Malaysia since 2011
- Istana Negara, Jalan Istana, Kuala Lumpur, Malaysia - Former National Palace of Malaysia, now the Royal Museum
- Istana Negara Singapura, the official residence and office of the President of Singapore.
