= Bogor Palace =

Presidential palace in West Java, Indonesia

Coordinates: 6°35′52.92″S 106°47′50.41″E

- Istana Bogor
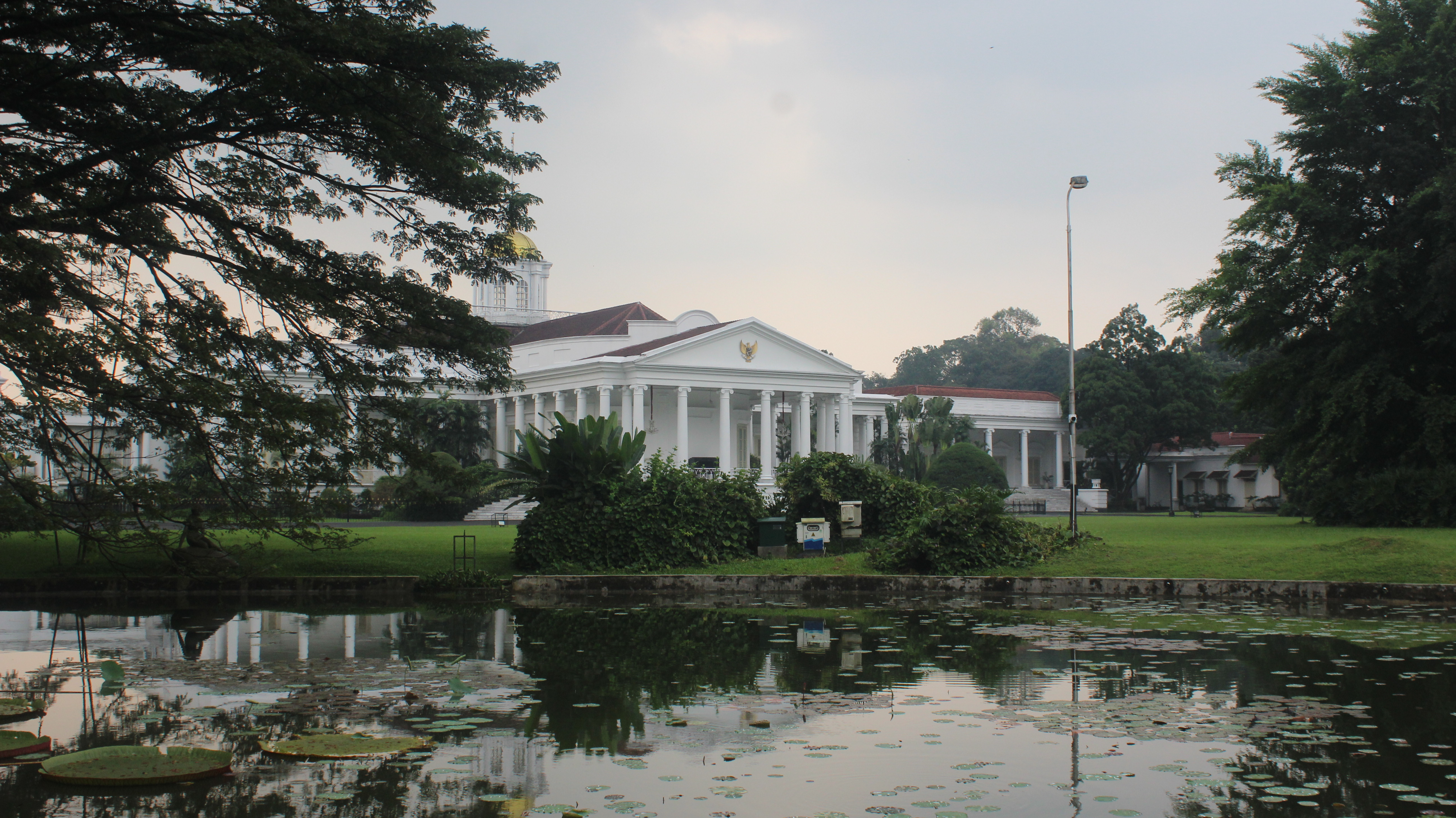
- Bogor Palace in 2024
- Interactive map of the Bogor Palace area
- Former names: Het Paleis te Buitenzorg

General information
- Architectural style: Indies Empire style
- Location: Jalan Ir. H. Juanda, Bogor Tengah; Bogor, West Java, Indonesia
- Construction started: 1744
- Renovated: rebuilt 1856
- Client: Dutch East Indies Governors-General

The Bogor Palace (Indonesian: Istana Bogor; Dutch: Het Paleis te Buitenzorg) is one of seven presidential palaces of Indonesia, it is located in the city of Bogor, West Java. The palace is noted for its distinctive architectural and historical features, as well as the adjoining botanical gardens. Istana Bogor was opened to the public in 1968 to public tour groups (not individuals), with the permission of the acting President of Indonesia Suharto. The gardens of the palace covers an area of 284,000 square metres (28.4 hectares).

During the colonial era the palace became the favorite residence of the governors-general due to Bogor's more adaptable climate. It was also favored by the late President Sukarno and became the official presidential residence until his downfall in 1967. The palace remained mostly unused until February 2015, when the new president Joko Widodo moved the president's office from Merdeka Palace to Bogor Palace.

== History ==
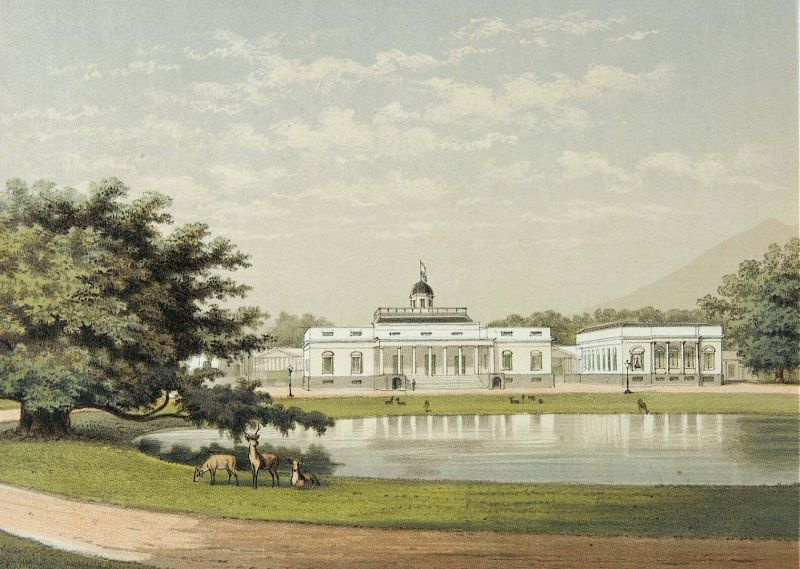
Lithograph of the palace in 1889.

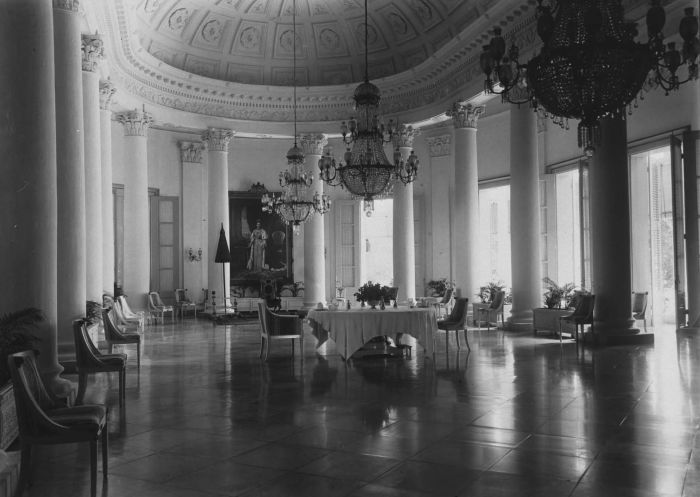
Interior of the palace in 1921, depicting the main hall of the palace

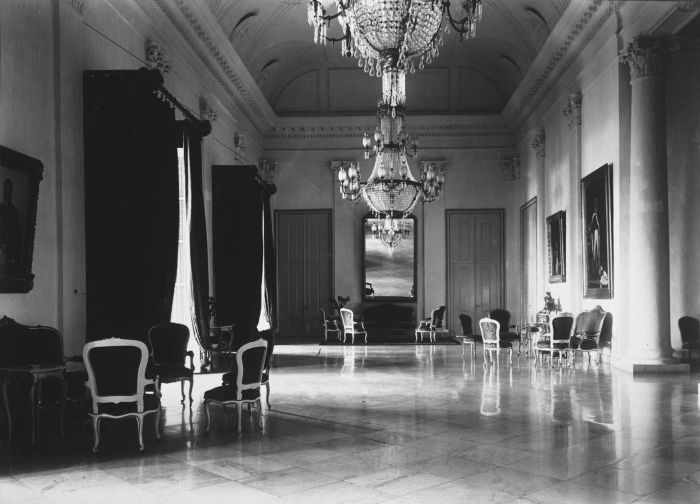
Interior of the palace in 1921

The original colonial building on the site of Istana Bogor was a mansion named Buitenzorg, meaning "without a care" in Dutch (also Sans Souci, meaning "without a care" in French), which dated back to 1745 as a country retreat for the Dutch governors to escape the heat and diseases of Batavia. The location for the new palace was discovered by Baron van Imhoff on 10 August 1744, in a village named Kampong Baroe. On the site he ordered a mansion to be built, however the construction was not completed by the end of his term in 1750, and thus it was continued by his successor Jacob Mossel.

An extensive renovation of the palace occurred under Governor-General Herman Willem Daendels (1808–1811). The palace was further expanded into two floors, with a new wing added in the east and west of the original structure.

In 1811 Stamford Raffles led a successful invasion of Java and Britain took possession of the colony until 1816. Raffles had Buitenzorg Palace as his residence due to the temperate climate of the hills of Bogor, while conducting most of the council meeting in the Palace of Rijswijk in Batavia. During his stay he had the garden of the Buitenzorg palace transformed into an English garden, which became an inspiration for the later botanical garden.

Later the new governor general Baron van der Capellen (1817–1826) added a small dome on the roof of the main building and founded the botanical garden next to the palace ground. However, in 1834, an earthquake triggered by the volcanic eruption of Mount Salak, heavily damaged the old palace of Buitenzorg. The ruined palace was then demolished and rebuilt into its present form in 1856— this time with only one storey instead of the original two, as a precaution against further earthquakes.

From 1870 to 1942 the Istana Bogor served as the official residence of the Dutch governor general, however state affairs were still largely conducted in Batavia. Since its foundation, a total of 44 governors-general of the Dutch East Indies had resided in the palace. After the Indonesian independence, several feature of the palace was renovated in 1952. Major changes include an additional porch at the main entrance and connecting corridors for the main buildings to its wings. The palace became the main residence of President Sukarno, but was later neglected by Suharto when he came to office.

== Bogor Palace complex area ==
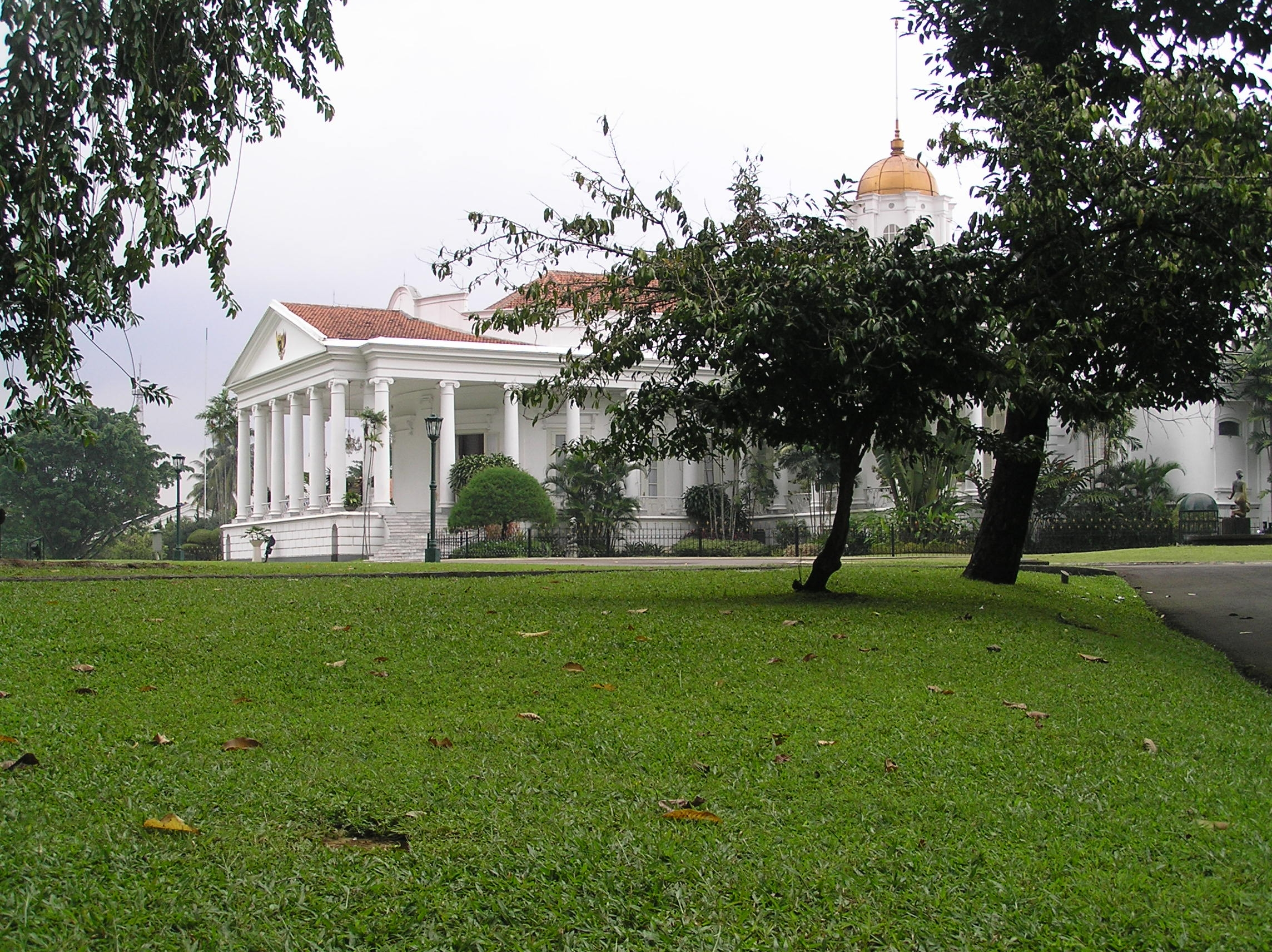
View from the side of the main entrance

The grounds of the estate contain several buildings, the largest are the Gedung Induk (main palace) and its two wings. The main palace building contains private offices for the head of state, library, dining room, theater room, the ministers' waiting room, the Teratai room (the living room) and the Garuda room (the main reception hall).

Two wing buildings are located east and west of the main building. The eastern wing is used as a guesthouse for foreign heads of state; during the colonial period this wing was used for the governor-general's personal guest. Meanwhile, the western wing has two main rooms: one is used as a guesthouse for ministers who accompany the main guest during a state visit, and the other is used as a conference room; during the colonial period this wing was used by the staff of the governor-general.

The palace is decorated with an extensive art collection (448 paintings, 216 sculptures and 196 ceramics), 90% of which were accumulated by Sukarno. The original historic collection of the palace was looted by Japanese and Allied force during World War 2, leaving nothing but five mirrors in the palace.

Other buildings in the palace include six pavilions: Paviliun Dyah Bayurini, Paviliun Jodipati, Paviliun Amarta, Paviliun Madukara, Paviliun Pringgondani, and Paviliun Dwarawati. Paviliun Dyah Bayurini was built in 1964 and is used by the head of state and his or her family during a stay in Bogor, the pavilion also include a swimming pool. Other buildings are used as guesthouses for government ministers and officials. There is also a multi-purpose building which was built in 1908.

=== Gardens ===
The garden covers an area of 28.4 hectare and are adjacent to Kebun Raya Bogor. A herd of spotted deer can be seen roaming around the palace garden; they are native to India and Nepal. The deer were originally brought by the governor-general Herman Willem Daendels for hunting and sport.

There are many sculptures of various origin decorating the palace garden, some of them are noteworthy:

- Dhyani Boddisatta, from 9th century Central Java.
- a replica of Hand of God by Carl Milles, a gift from Swedish government.
- a replica of The Little Mermaid.
- a replica of The Archer, made by Zsigmond Kisfaludi Strobl in 1914.

=== Balai Kirti Presidential Museum ===
In the Bogor Presidential Palace area there is a museum called the Indonesian Presidential Museum Balai Kirti. The idea of building this museum was initiated by President Susilo Bambang Yudhoyono in 2012 and was inaugurated by him on October 18, 2014. Balai Kirti can be interpreted as a building that houses various historical objects, relics of the historical journey of the leadership of the Presidents of the Republic of Indonesia.

The Balai Kirti Presidential Museum can be interpreted as a building that stores historical relics of the leadership of the Presidents of the Republic of Indonesia. The ideas and works of the presidents are a reflection of a nation's civilization and should be a memory for all time that is arranged in a special room that stores many important memories. There are a number of important rules that must be followed for visitors coming to the museum, locals and foreigners alike.

== Hotel Salak The Heritage ==
In 1856, along with the rebuilding of the Bogor Palace, the Dutch government built a hotel to serve as a guesthouse in Bogor Palace. The hotel was first named the Dibbets Hotel for the founder, J. Dibbets. The hotel was also once known as the Binnenhof Hotel or Bellevue Hotel.

During the Japanese occupation (1942–1945), the hotel was used as the Kempetai Headquarters (Japanese Military Police). After Indonesia's independence, the hotel was handed over to the Indonesian government and was renamed the Hotel Salak The Heritage after the name of Mount Salak, the largest mountain in Bogor. The word "The Heritage" was used to express to the public that this hotel is indeed one of the heritages of the city of Bogor.

Hotel Salak The Heritage is currently managed professionally, with 120 rooms, 12 meeting rooms, 3 restaurants, the Kinanty Music Café, a swimming pool, and other facilities. Hotel Salak The Heritage is still preserved by the government as one of the historical witnesses supporting the existence of the Bogor Palace in particular and the long history of the city of Bogor.

== See also ==
- Cipanas Palace
- Gedung Agung
- State Palace (Indonesia)
- Vice Presidential Palace (Indonesia)
