= Garuda Palace =

- Istana Garuda
- The palace seen from the Ceremonial Plaza park
- Interactive map of the Garuda Palace area
- Former names: Kantor Presiden (Presidential Office, during planning and construction)

General information
- Status: Completed
- Architectural style: Indonesian
- Location: Nusantara, Indonesia
- Coordinates: 0.95846°S 116.69657°E
- Construction started: 2022
- Completed: 2025
- Opening: 2025

Design and construction
- Architect: Nyoman Nuarta

The Garuda Palace (Indonesian: Istana Garuda) is one of seven presidential palaces in Indonesia, situated atop a hill facing southwest to Plaza Seremoni (Ceremony Plaza) and Bukit Bendera (Flag Hill) in Nusantara, the future capital city of Indonesia. The 2,400 m^{2} (26,000 sq ft) palace was built by the Joko Widodo administration and placed in one complex with the State Palace (Istana Negara, situated beneath and southeast of the Garuda Palace), the Presidential Secretariat Office, and four coordinating ministries.

The architectural design is based on the Garuda design created by Nyoman Nuarta, a renowned sculptor. The design was approved by President Joko Widodo in 2022. The palace is part of the 55.7 hectare Nusantara Presidential Complex.

As a landmark and a point of interest of Nusantara, the palace is enclosed with a Garuda sheath. The Garuda sheath is 77 m (253 ft) in height and 177 m (581 ft) in wingspan. The sheath consists of 4,650 copper bars, each weighing 300 kg (660 lb), arranged in the shape of a flying Garuda. The palace is considered an architectural and construction marvel exhibiting Indonesian capability in art, science, and technology. Garuda Palace is the second Indonesian presidential palace to be built after the Proclamation of Independence in 1945, the first being Tampaksiring Palace in Bali. Both are the only presidential palaces located outside Java.

== See also ==
- Merdeka Palace — Jakarta
- List of presidential palaces in Indonesia
