= Merdeka Palace =

Official Indonesian presidential residence, in Jakarta

- Istana Merdeka
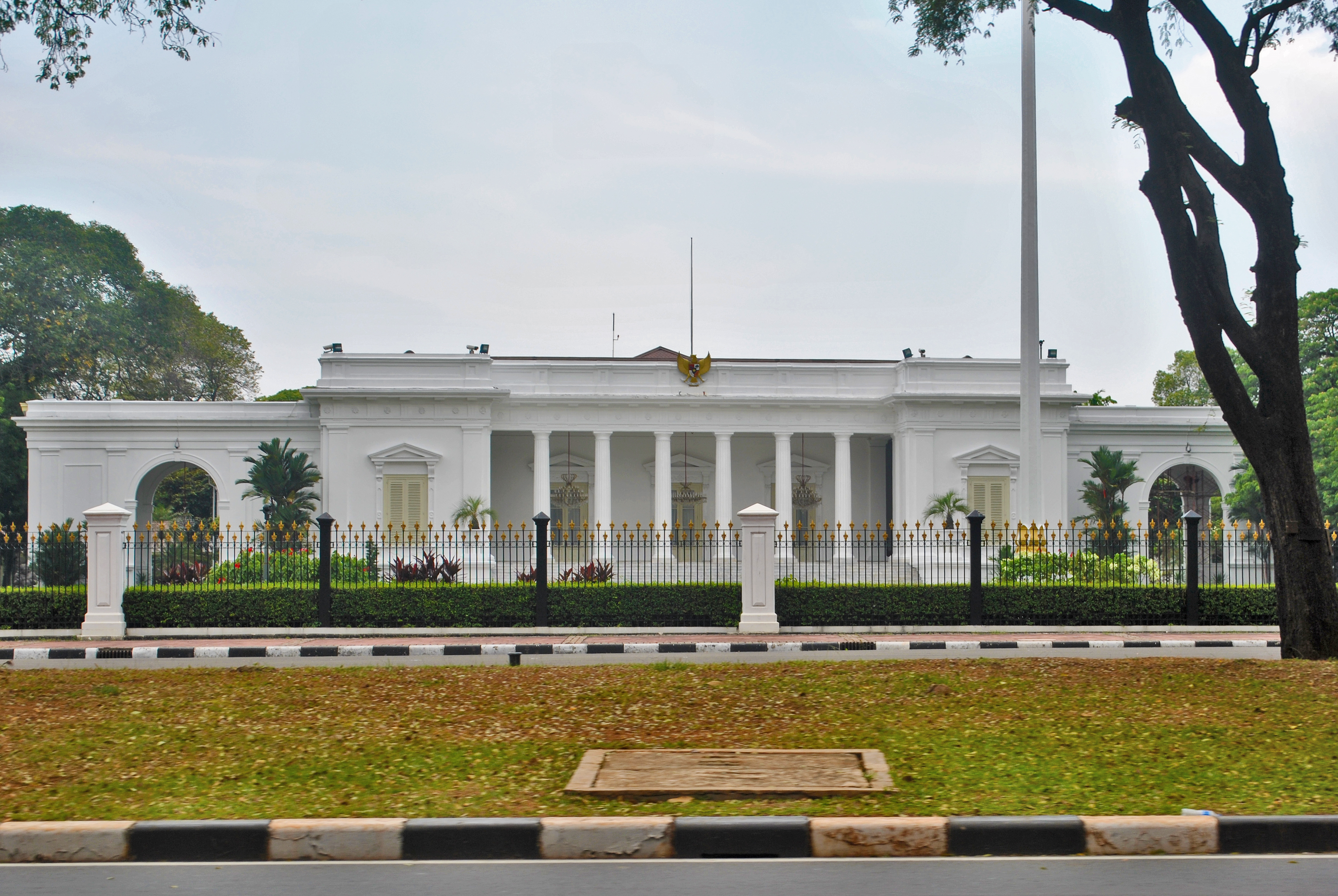
- Front facade of the Merdeka Palace, 2016
- Former names: Paleis te Koningsplein

General information
- Type: Official residence
- Architectural style: Indies Empire style
- Location: Jalan Medan Merdeka Utara Gambir, Central Jakarta, Indonesia
- Coordinates: 06°10′13″S 106°49′27″E
- Current tenants: President of Indonesia
- Construction started: 1873
- Completed: 1879
- Client: Governor-General of the Dutch East Indies
- Owner: Government of Indonesia

Design and construction
- Architect: Jacobus Bartholomeus Drossaers

The Merdeka Palace (Indonesian: Istana Merdeka; also known in Indonesian as Istana Gambir and during the Dutch colonial times as Paleis te Koningsplein) is one of seven presidential palaces in Indonesia. It is located on the north side of the Merdeka Square in Central Jakarta, Indonesia, and was used as the official residence of the president of the Republic of Indonesia.

The palace was a residence for the governor-general of the Dutch East Indies during the colonial era. In 1949, the palace was renamed Merdeka Palace, "(ke)merdeka(an)" meaning "freedom" or "independence".

The Merdeka Palace is part of the 6.8 ha (17 acres) Jakarta Presidential Palace Complex, which also includes the Negara Palace, Wisma Negara (state guest house), Sekretariat Negara (State Secretariat), and the Bina Graha building. It is the center of the Indonesian executive authority.

== History ==
=== Construction and first use ===
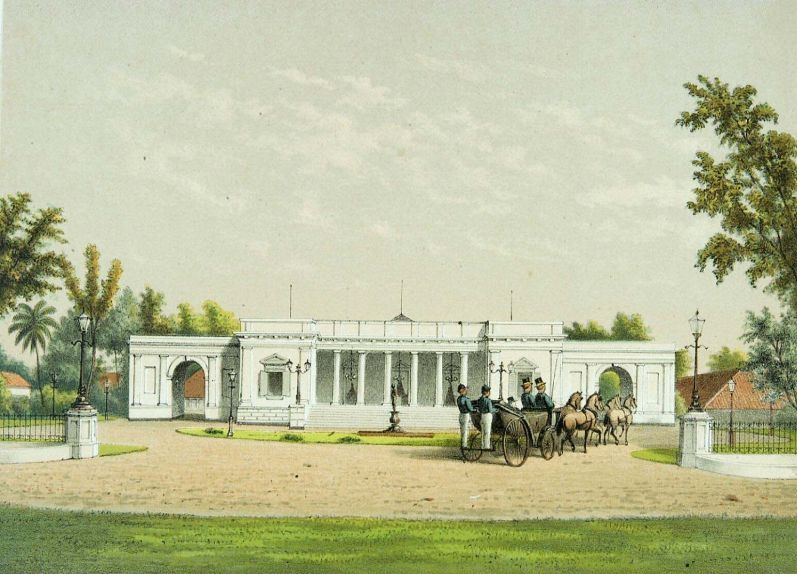
Lithograph of the Paleis te Koningsplein in the 1880s (now Merdeka Palace)

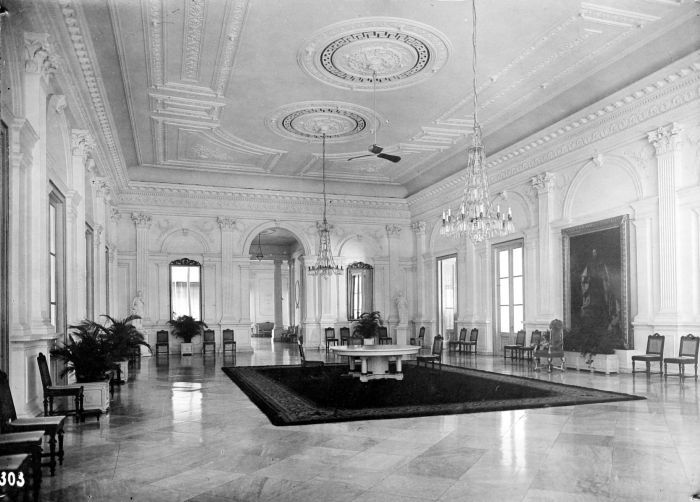
Reception room of the palace in 1936

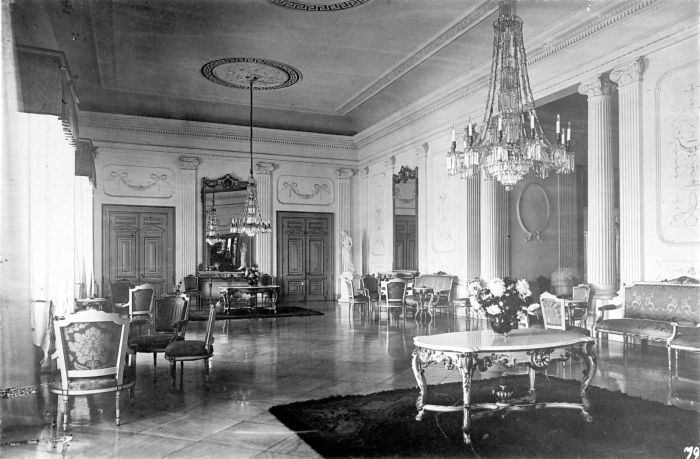
Interior of the palace in 1936

The building that is now the Merdeka Palace was built on the premise of the Rijswijk Palace (present Istana Negara) when it was considered no longer sufficient for administrative purposes e.g. big receptions and conferences during the mid-19th century. In 1869, the instruction to construct a new palace was given by Governor-General Pieter Mijer. Construction took place on the south lawn of the Rijswijk Palace on 23 March 1873 during the tenure of Governor-General James Loudon.

The Neo-Palladian palace was designed by Jacobus Bartholomeus Drossaers and was built by the Department of Public Works and the contracting firm Drossaers & Company for ƒ 360,000. The new building was built in the southern part of the Rijswijk Palace grounds, directly facing Koningsplein (now Merdeka Square).

Construction of the palace was finished in 1879 during the tenure of Governor-General Johan Wilhelm van Lansberge. The new palace was given the official name Paleis van de Gouverneur Generaal ("Palace of the Governor-General"), the official residence of the governor-general of the Dutch East Indies and his family.

Governor-General Johan Wilhelm van Lansberge (1875–1881) was the first to reside in the building. Governor-General Tjarda van Starkenborgh Stachouwer (1936–1942) was the last Dutch governor-general to reside in the Palace.

=== Japanese occupation ===
During the Japanese occupation of the Dutch East Indies (1942–1945), the Army Commander (Japanese: 最高指揮官, romanized: saikō shiki-kan, lit. 'Commander-in-chief') of the Japanese garrison resided in the Rijswijk Palace compound. Three Japanese commanders have taken residence in the Merdeka Palace.

=== Post-independence ===
The Indonesian National Revolution (1945–1949) ended with the Netherlands' recognition of the Republic of Indonesia. The Indonesian declaration of independence from the Dutch in 1949 was announced in Gambir Palace. During the ceremony, the Dutch flag was substituted with the flag of Indonesia. Many spectators were rejoicing when the flag was hoisted, and yelled "Merdeka! (Freedom!)". From that moment, Gambir Palace became known as Merdeka Palace. Tony Lovink, the high commissioner of the Dutch Crown was the last man representing the Dutch power to leave the palace. The name of the palace officially changed to Istana Merdeka ("Indendepence Palace") on 28 December 1949 at 17.55 hours.

On 27 December 1949, a day after the ceremony, President Sukarno and his family arrived from Yogyakarta. For the first time, the president of the Republic of Indonesia settled in Merdeka Palace.

The first annual Independence Day ceremony was held at the Merdeka Palace in 1950.

== Evolution of the Merdeka Palace ==
The building has remained unchanged since the building was finished in 1879. After the Indonesian independence, the Merdeka Palace compound was expanded to include not only Istana Negara (State Palace), but also to construct theWisma Negara, Sekretariat Negara (State Sectreatiat), and Bina Graha. Several colonial buildings and residences were demolished in the Weltevreden area to make way for today's State Palace compound.

A small octagonal gazebo located in the courtyard of the palace was used as a private school for Sukarno's and the palace staff's children. This gazebo was previously used by Dutch colonial officials as muziekkoepel (music gazebo), where music performances were played during formal balls.

When Suharto became president of Indonesia, he made changes to the previously residential function of the palace. Sukarno's bedroom was converted into Ruang Bendera Pusaka (Regalia Room) and the room of Sukarno's wife Fatmawati became the president's bedroom. An old wooden building in the palace complex known as "Sanggar" was demolished to make way for the Puri Bhakti Renatama building, and was used as a museum to store valuable artifacts, artwork, and gifts from foreign emissaries. Later he also built the Bina Graha building on the palace grounds, which he used as his office.

When Megawati took office, the Puri Bhakti Renatama building was converted into the President's office, while its contents moved to the Bina Graha building. She also restored the furniture and decorations of the palace to the way it was under Sukarno. Suharto's Jepara wood carving furniture was removed, except the Ruang Jepara (Jepara Room, as a reminder of Suharto's regime), and replaced with the old colonial refurbishment.

== The Merdeka Palace now ==
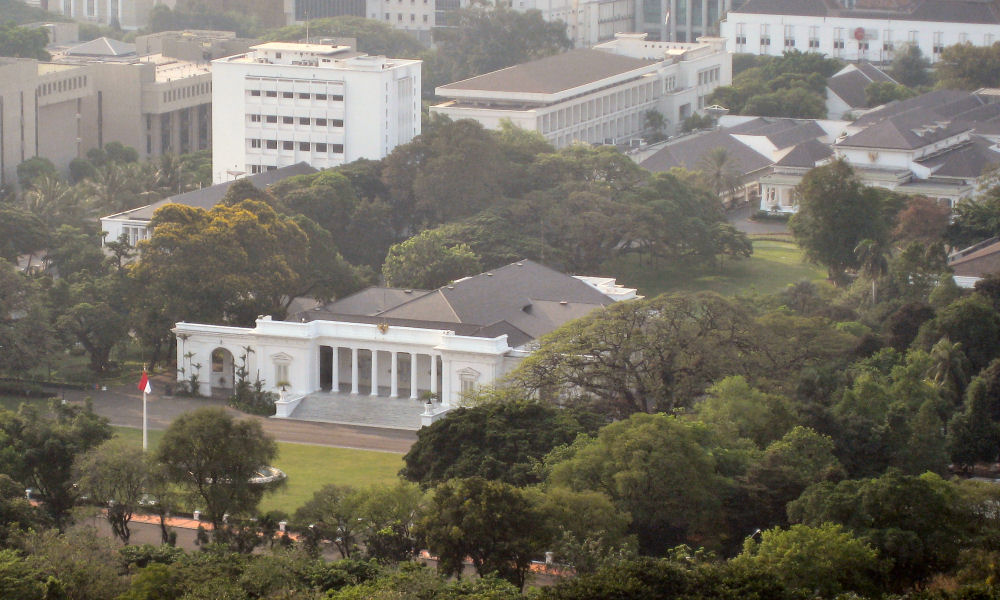
Aerial view of the palace compound

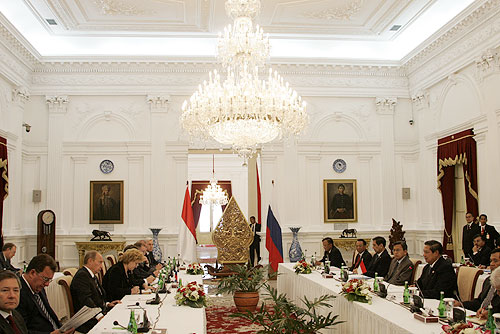
Vladimir Putin meeting Yudhoyono at the Merdeka Palace during the Russian state visit of 2007

The Merdeka Palace serves as an official venue for state events such as the Independence Day ceremony, welcoming (foreign) dignitaries, cabinet meetings, state banquets, and reception of letters of credence from foreign ambassadors. Additionally, it still contains the president's private quarters and offices.

The administrative role that the palace once had has been shifted to the State Palace and State Secretariat, while the Merdeka Palace remains a symbol of authority.

=== Layout of the palace ===
A 17 m tall flagpole and a fountain are located on the front lawn of the Merdeka Palace. The annual flag-raising ceremony takes place during Indonesian Independence Day on 17 August. During the Independence ceremony, the veranda is often used as a ceremonial stage for the President and dignitaries.

Notable rooms in the Palace include:

- Ruang Kredensial (credential hall) provides entrance to the palace and is the place where most diplomatic activities are conducted, such as receiving state guests and ambassadors. The credential hall is decorated with furniture that dates back to the colonial days, as well as paintings and ceramic works.
- Ruang Jepara (Jepara room) was a former study room of Sukarno and named after the Central Javanese town of Jepara, the source of the room's carved wooden furniture and ornaments.
- Ruang Raden Saleh (Raden Saleh's room) is located in front of Ruang Jepara. The room was previously used as the First Lady's office and living room. Megawati used the room to store 5 paintings by Indonesian painter Raden Saleh.
- Ruang Resepsi (reception room) is the largest room in the palace. It is usually used for state banquets, state gala dinners, national meetings, and cultural performances. There are two paintings by Basuki Abdullah. On the eastern wall hangs "Pergiwa Pergiwati", a painting theme from Mahabharata, and on the west wall hangs the Javanese "Jaka Tarub" painting.
- Ruang Bendera Pusaka (the heirloom flag room), or Regalia room. The room is used to store "Bendera Pusaka", the first Indonesian flag that was raised during the Indonesian Declaration of Independence on 17 August 1945.

The presidents after Sukarno no longer use the palace as a residence, although it is still the official presidential residence. The palace's offices are still in use by the current Indonesian president. During the Suharto administration, Suharto preferred to reside in his house at Jalan Cendana, Menteng, while the palace and Bina Graha only served as his office. The palace once again became the official presidential residence during the Abdurrahman Wahid and Megawati administrations. Susilo Bambang Yudhoyono sometimes resides in Merdeka Palace, however just like Suharto, he often prefers to reside in his own house, at Puri Cikeas, Gunung Putri district of Bogor Regency – West Java, south of Jakarta. The 7th former president Joko Widodo preferred to live in Istana Bogor.

== Changing of the guard ==
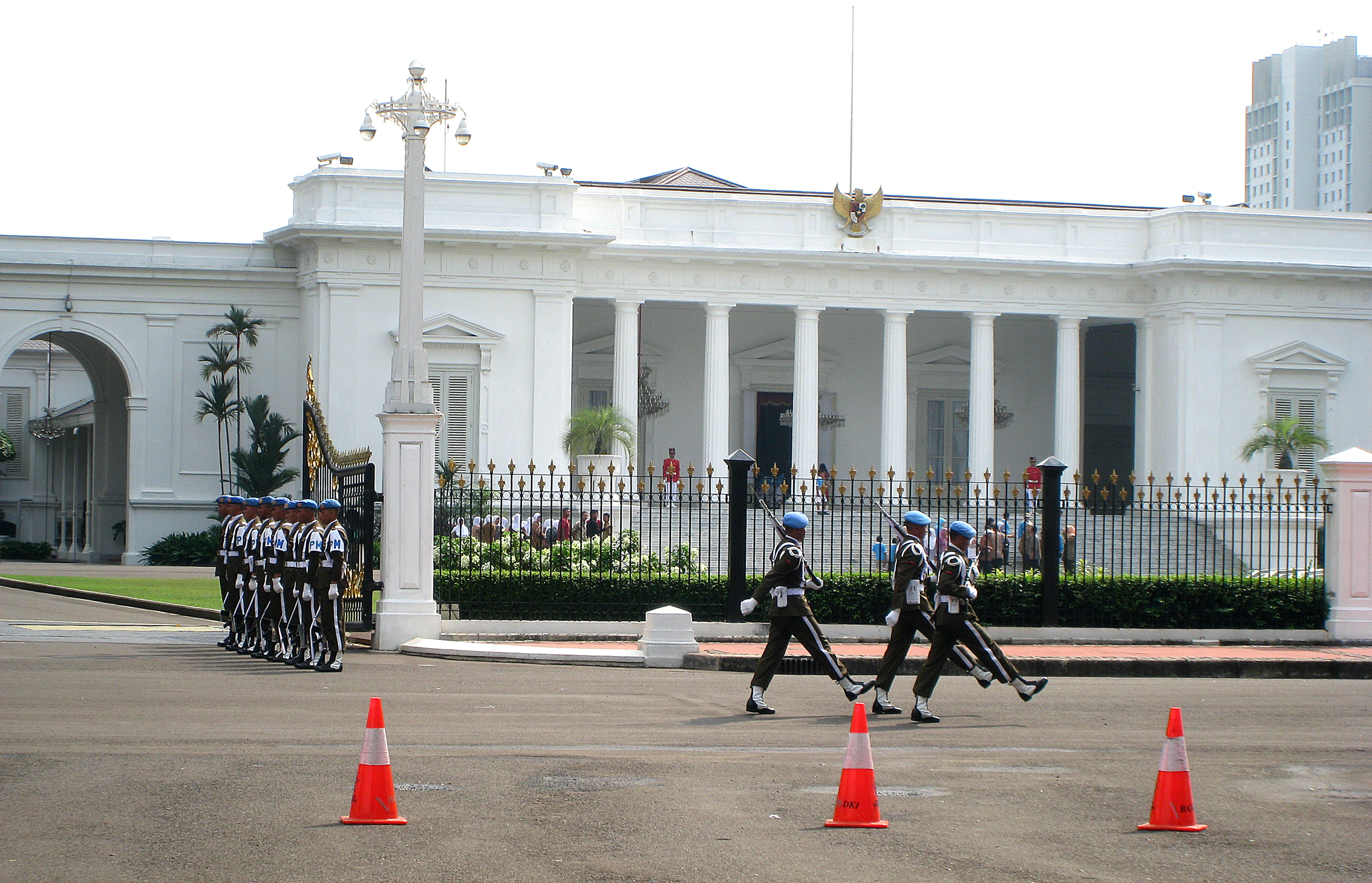
Changing of the guard ceremony at the Merdeka Palace

Since 17 July 2016, the changing of the guard ceremony by the Paspampres has been opened to the public. It is held at 8am on every last Sunday of the month in front of the palace yard.

== See also ==
- Garuda Palace - Nusantara
- List of presidential palaces in Indonesia
  - Bogor Palace
  - Cipanas Palace
  - Gedung Agung
- Vice Presidential Palace (Indonesia)
- Official residence

== Cited works ==
- Djawatan Penerangan Kotapradja Djakarta Raya (1957). Djakarta Dewasa Ini [Jakarta Today] (in Indonesian). Jakarta: Djawatan Penerangan Kotapradja Djakarta Raya.
