= Vice Presidential Palace (Indonesia) =

- Istana Wakil Presiden
- Interactive map of the Vice Presidential Palace area

General information
- Status: Completed
- Architectural style: Indonesian
- Location: Nusantara, Indonesia
- Coordinates: 0.978129°S 116.705005°E
- Construction started: 2024
- Completed: 2026
- Opening: 2026

Design and construction
- Architect: Daliana Suryawinata

The Vice Presidential Palace (Indonesian: Istana Wakil Presiden) is the official residence of the Vice President of Indonesia, located on Sumbu Kebangsaan Sisi Barat Road in Nusantara. The palace is in use since 2026, when offices of the Vice President of Indonesia began relocation process from the old palace in Jakarta. Vice President Gibran Rakabuming Raka, his wife Second Lady Selvi Ananda Putri, and their 2 children will start to reside in the palace within 2026.

== See also ==
- Istana Negara (Nusantara)
- Garuda Palace
