= Fort Vredeburg Museum =

History museum in Jalan Ahmad Yani No. 6, Yogyakarta

- Museum Benteng Vredeburg Yogyakarta ꦩꦸꦱꦶꦪꦸꦩ꧀ꦧꦺꦠꦺꦁꦮ꦳ꦿꦺꦢꦼꦧꦸꦂꦒ꧀
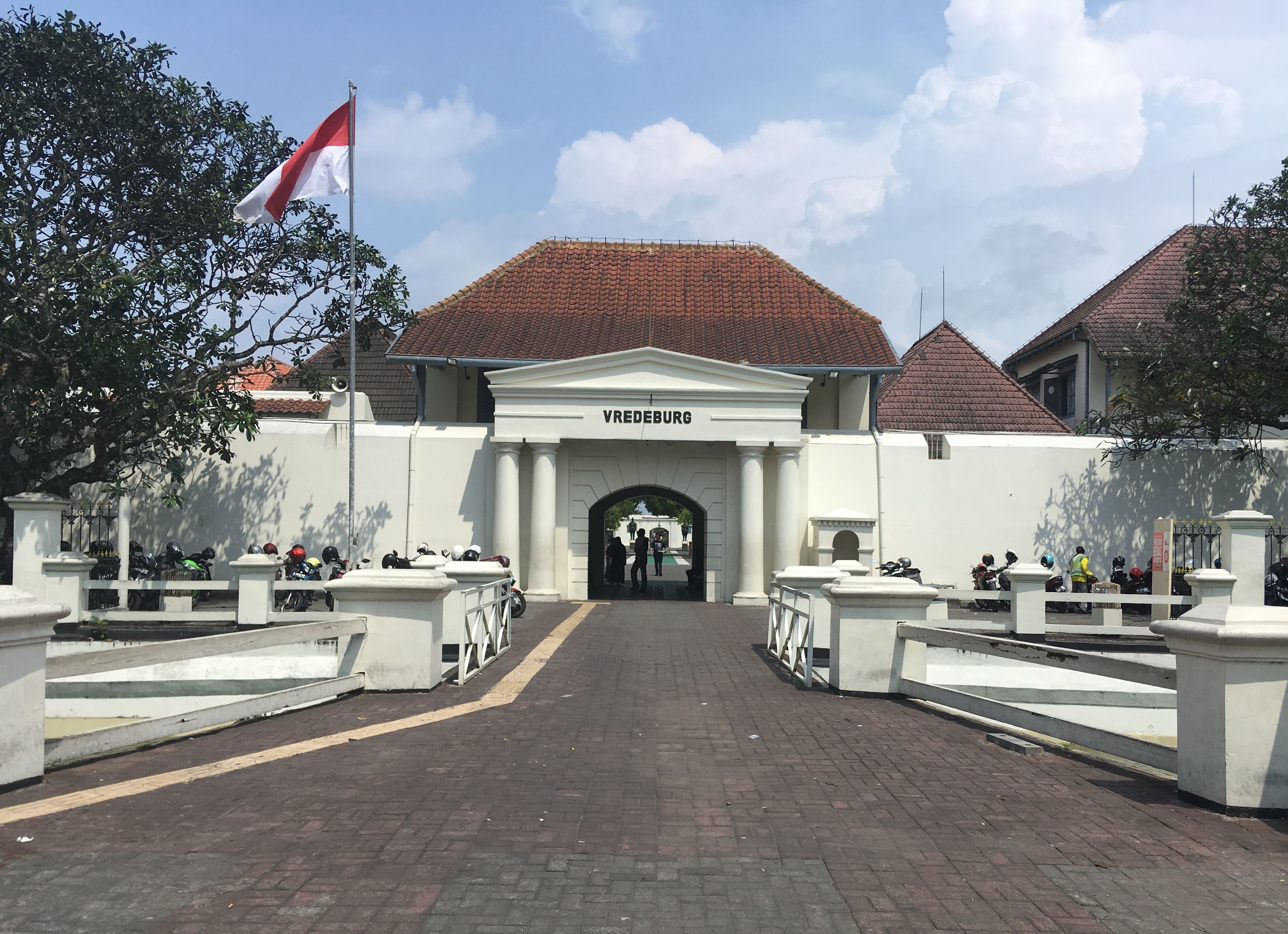
- Entrance to Fort Vredeburg

- Location in Yogyakarta
- Established: March 11, 1987
- Location: Jalan Ahmad Yani No. 6, Yogyakarta, Special Region of Yogyakarta, Indonesia
- Coordinates: 7.8003°S 110.3663°E
- Type: History museum
- Collection size: Dioramas, historical objects, replicas
- Architect: Frans Haak
- Owners: Yogyakarta Sultanate (land owner); Ministry of Culture via Indonesian Heritage Agency (operator)
- Public transit access: Trans Jogja: 1A, 2A, 3A, 8 (Ahmad Yani)
- Website: vredeburg.id

Fort Vredeburg Museum (Indonesian: Museum Benteng Vredeburg; Javanese: ꦩꦸꦱꦶꦪꦸꦩ꧀ꦧꦺꦠꦺꦁꦮ꦳ꦿꦺꦢꦼꦧꦸꦂꦒ꧀, romanized: Musiyum Bètèng Vrèdeburg) was a former colonial fortress located in the city of Yogyakarta, Special Region of Yogyakarta, Indonesia. The military complex—owned by the Yogyakarta Sultanate, but leased to the central government and managed by an agency of the central government—has been converted into a museum of the Indonesian independence struggle which was opened in 1992. It is located in front of Gedung Agung and near the Kraton Yogyakarta (Sultan's Palace).

== History ==
=== The Fortress ===
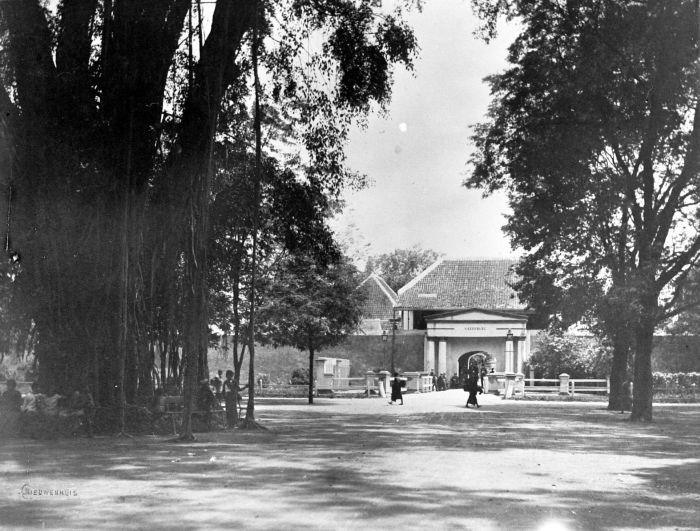
Fort Vredeburg in the early 20th century.

In 1760, after the foundation of the new Kraton Ngayogyakarta Hadiningrat, the Dutch governor of North Java coast Nicolaas Harting requested a fort to be built in Yogyakarta. The barracks was built on a plot provided by Sultan Hamengkubuwono I, the first fort was a simple wooden fort with four bastions. Later in 1767 the fortress was extended and converted into a more permanent structure under supervision of a Dutch architect Frans Haak. After its completion in 1787 the fort was named Fort Rustenburg ("resting fort" in Dutch).

In 1867 the old fort was destroyed by an earthquake. The fort was rebuilt and renamed Fort Vredeburg, which in the Dutch language means "peace fort" due to peaceful co-existence of the fort and the Kraton of the Sultan.

Later in 1942, during the Japanese occupation of the Dutch East Indies, the fortress was taken over by the Japanese army and made into the army's headquarters and war prison. After the Japanese left in 1945, Fort Vredeburg served the Indonesian Army as a military command post, barracks and prison for suspected members of the communist party.

=== The museum ===
In 1947 the ceremonies on honoring Budi Utomo's 40th founding anniversary was held in the fort. At the occasion, Ki Hadjar Dewantara expressed the idea of converting the fortress into a cultural institution. To realize this, a newly set up foundation took charge of the gradual restoration of the former fort.

An agreement was concluded to have a cultural institution in the fort, between Daoed Joesoef, the Minister of Education and Culture and Sultan Hamengkubuwono IX in 1980. As a result, major renovation of the building took place in 1982. In 1984 Nugroho Notosusanto, the new Minister, changed the original plans and instead, created a museum intended to showcase Indonesia's struggle for independence. The museum was officially opened on 23 November 1992.

In 2006, Yogyakarta was devastated by an earthquake that damaged a large number of buildings and cultural properties in the region, including the fort. It was repaired later afterwards.

== Exhibition ==
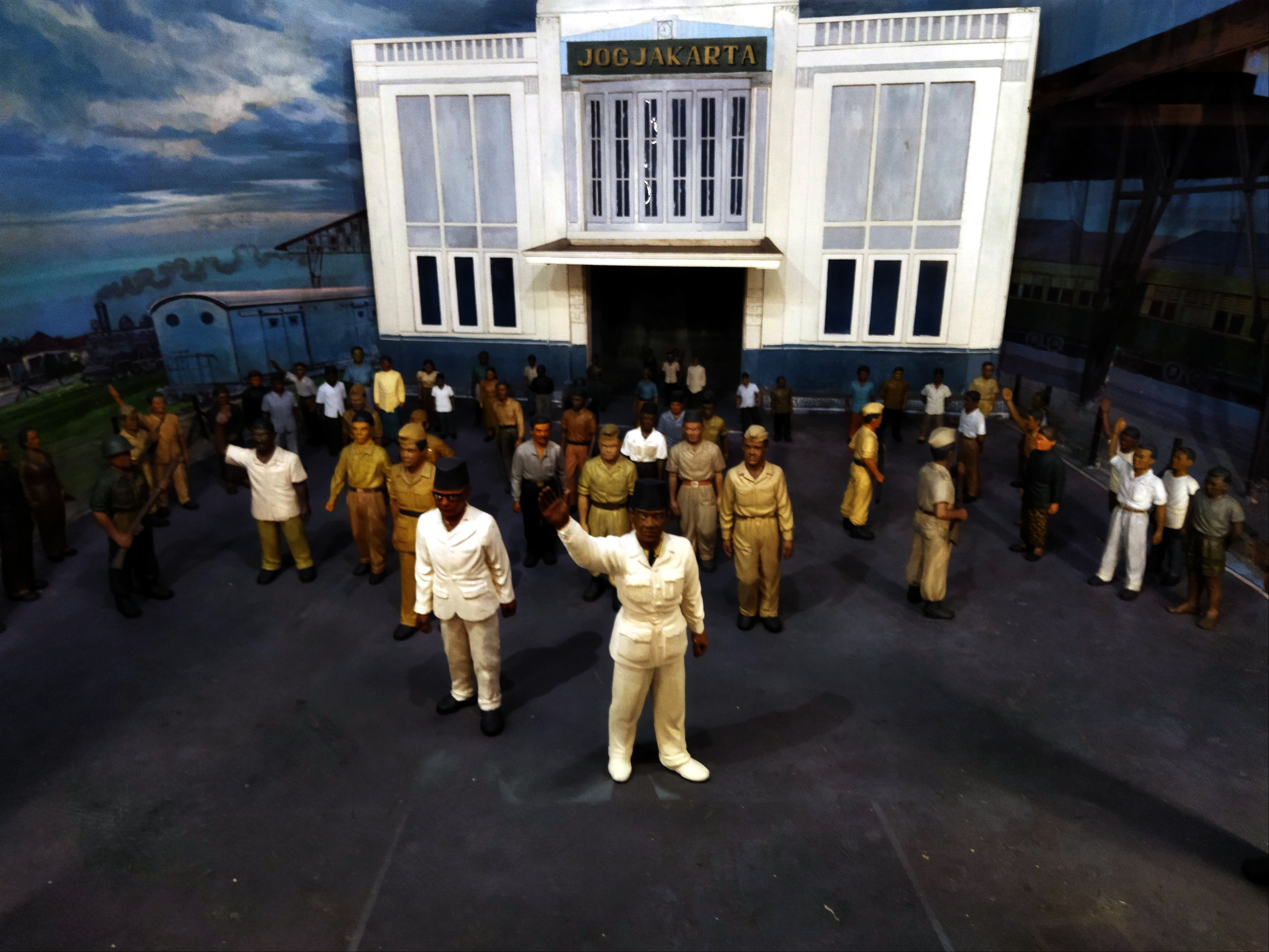
A diorama inside Fort Vredeburg museum

The museum includes collections of old photographs, historical objects and replicas. A diorama portraying Indonesia's journey for independence is also displayed in the museum. The original design included 93 of these diorama showcases, however when the museum opened in 1992, only 30 of them were finished. Another 18 showcases have been added as of March 1996.

All events depicted in the diorama's showcases took place in Yogyakarta and its surrounding region. The dioramas cover various events from the capture of Pangeran Diponegoro in 1830 to Sukarno's return to Jakarta in 1949. The dioramas are divided into 2 sections: one depicts remarkable events (33), such as the founding of Muhammadiyah or Taman Siswa; and another focusing on war and struggle (15) such as guerrilla warfare during the independence war.

== Architecture ==
This fort was built as the center of government and defense for the Dutch residents at that time, surrounded by a moat (jagang) of which some of the remains have been reconstructed and can be seen today. This square-shaped fort has four bastions (watch towers) in each of the corners.

== Gallery ==
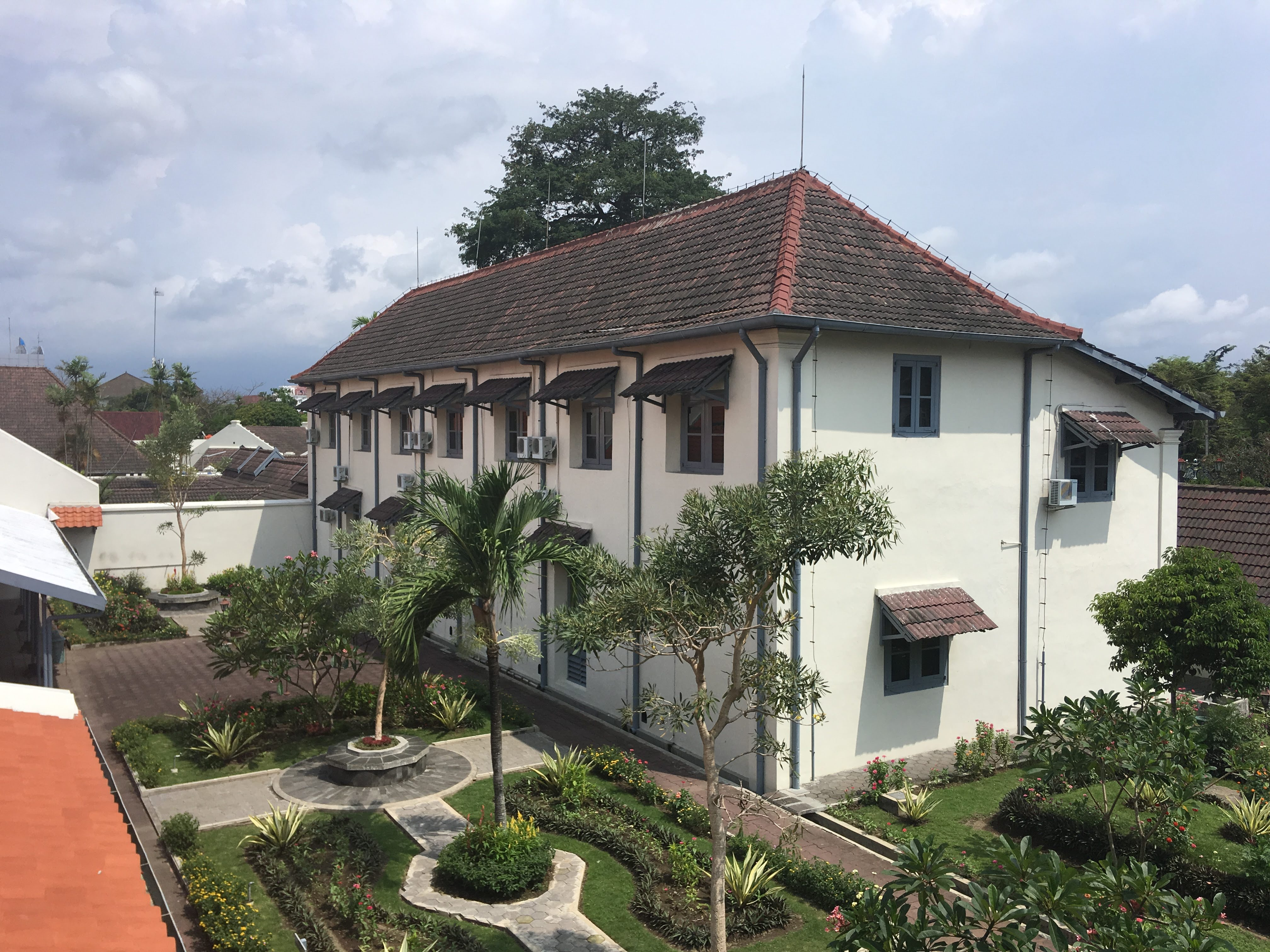

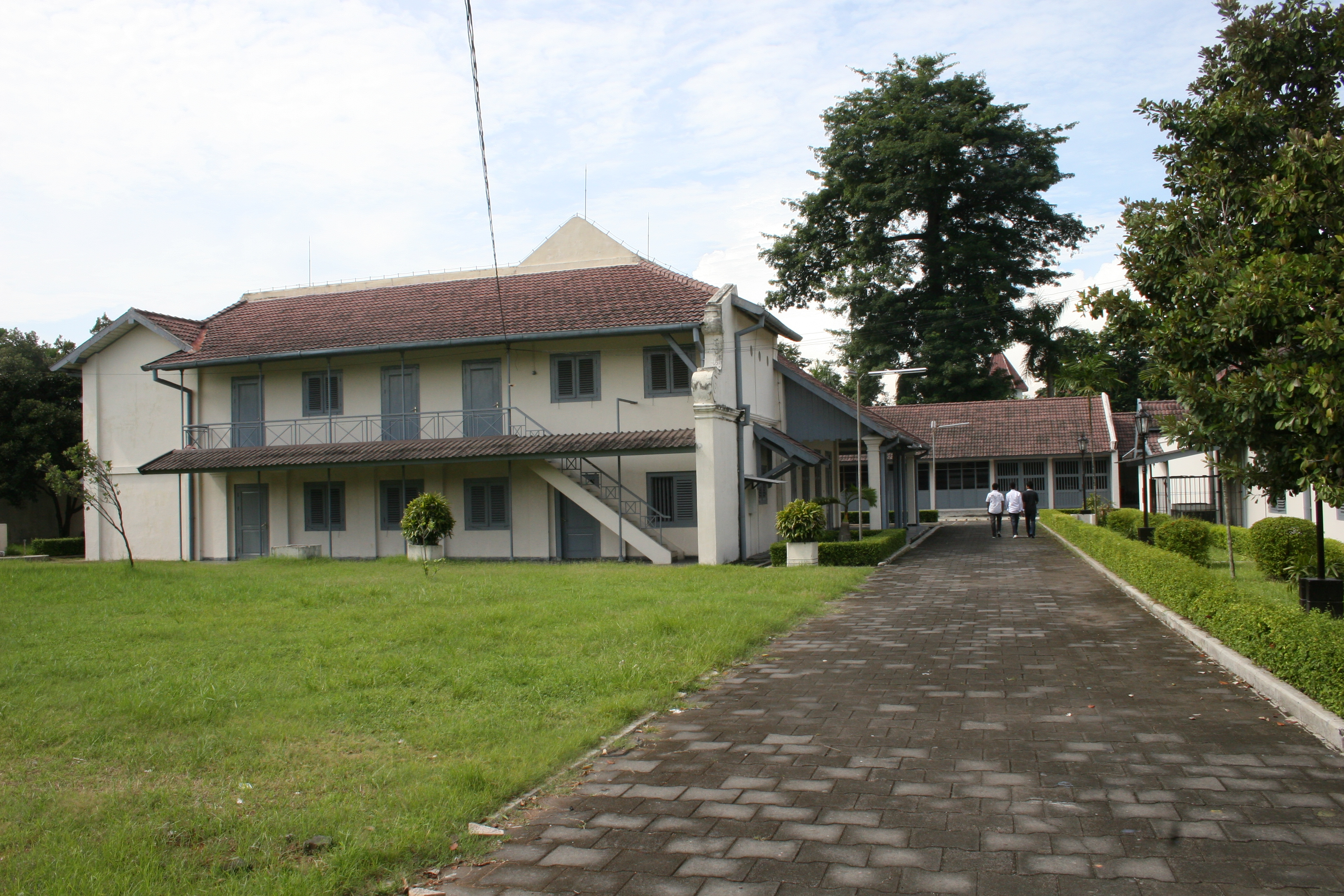

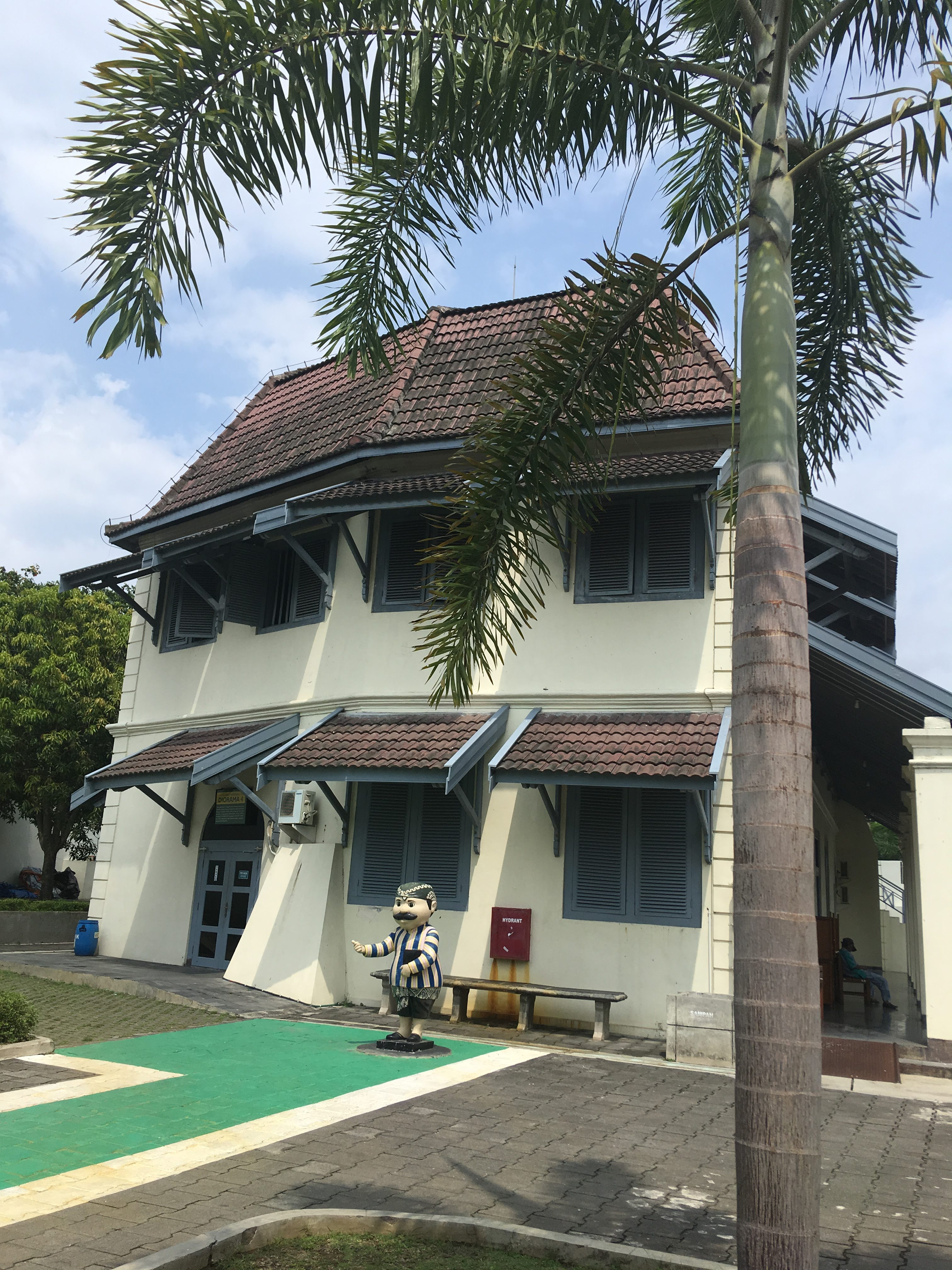

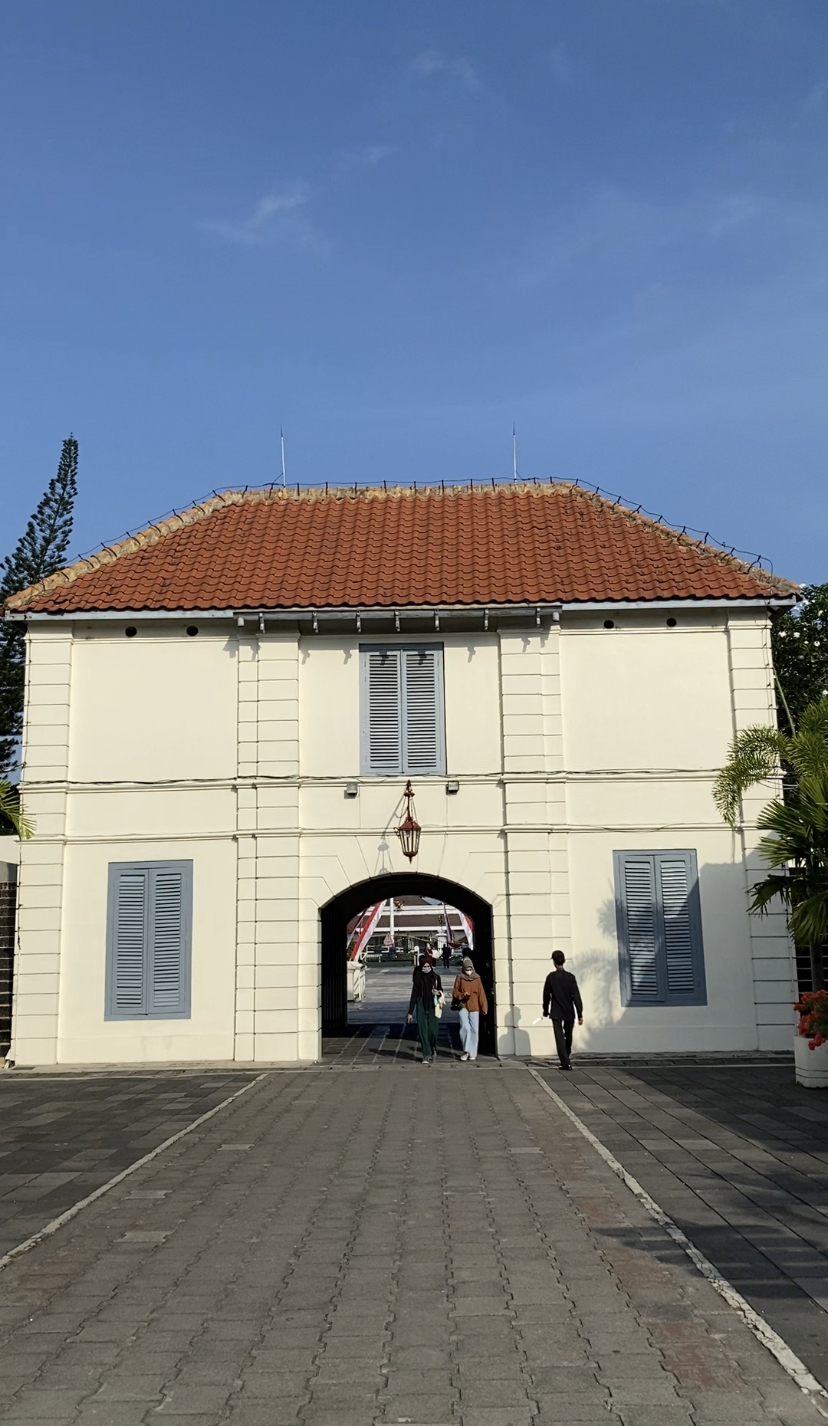

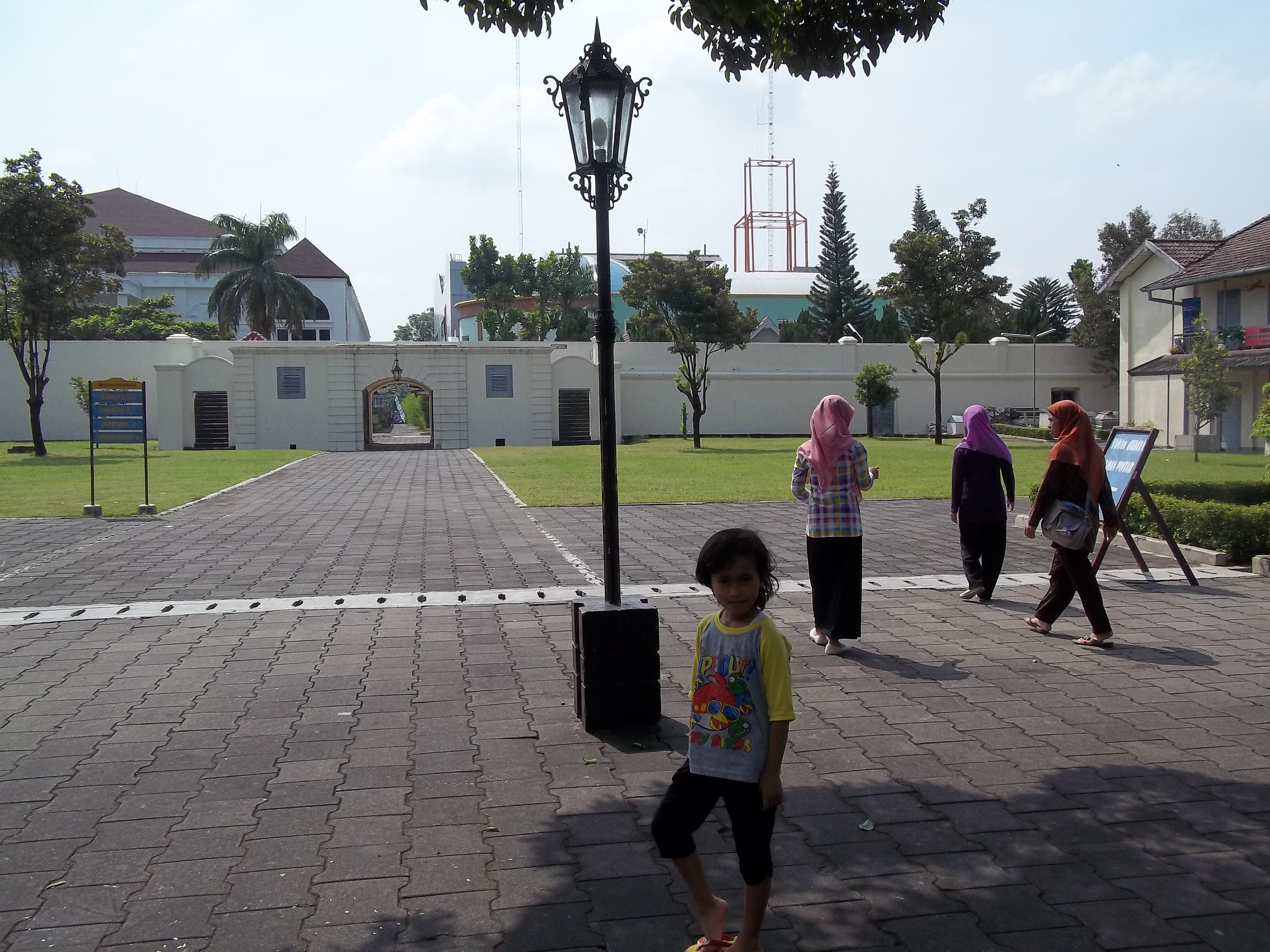

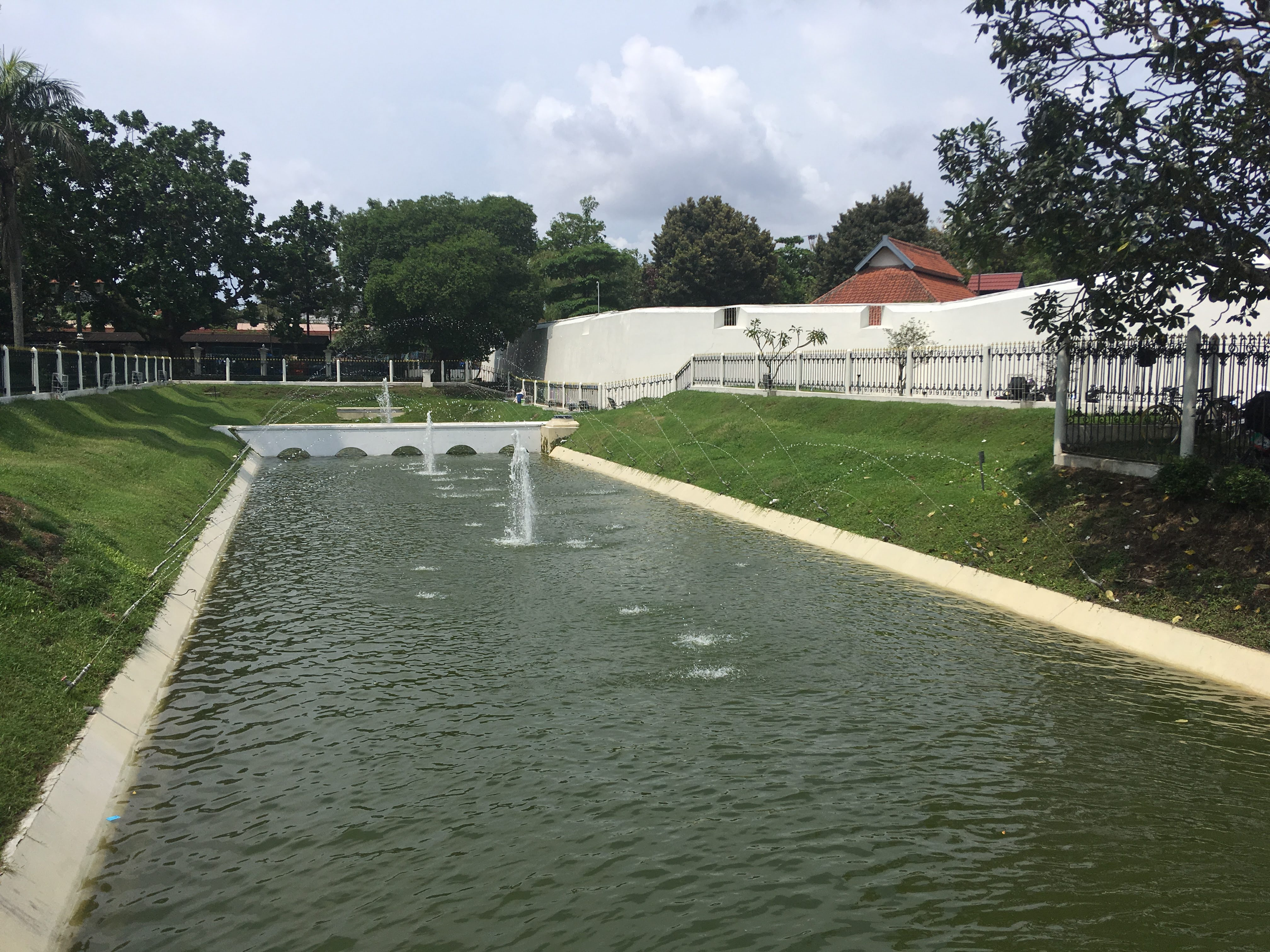
