= Gedung Agung =

The Great Building
- Gedung Agung ꦒꦼꦝꦺꦴꦁꦄꦒꦼꦁ
- Gedung Agung in Yogyakarta

- Location within Yogyakarta

General information
- Architectural style: Indies Architecture
- Location: Jalan Ahmad Yani, Gondomanan, Yogyakarta
- Coordinates: 7.800227358721231°S 110.3645401729129°E
- Construction started: 1869
- Client: Resident of Yogyakarta, Governor of Yogykarta

The Gedung Agung (English: The Great Building; Javanese: ꦒꦼꦝꦺꦴꦁꦄꦒꦼꦁ, romanized: Gedhong Ageng) is one of seven presidential palaces of Indonesia, it is located in the city of Yogyakarta. The palace complex covers an area of approximately 4.4 hectares. It is located in front of Fort Vredeburg.

== History ==
It was initially built in 1824 on an estate owned by the 18th Dutch resident of Yogyakarta, Anthonie Hendriks Smissaert. The first building was designed by an architect named A. Payen, with typical Indies tropical architecture design. The construction of the building was delayed by the ongoing Java War, a rebellion led by Prince Diponegoro and was only completed in 1832.

An earthquake shook and toppled the first palace on 10 June 1867 and the building was initially rebuilt in 1869. The status of Yogyakarta was changed from Resident to a province on 19 December 1927, thus the building changed its purpose as the governor's office.

During the struggle for Independence, the capital city of Jakarta was occupied by Allied forces and the government was moved to Yogyakarta on 6 January 1946. The palace became the residence of president Sukarno between 1946 and 1949, until the government was moved back to Jakarta on 28 December 1949.

After Suharto's became the 2nd president of Indonesia, the palace was made a venue for afternoon parade on every 17 August to commemorate Indonesia's independence. Later in 1991 the building is used to celebrate every moment of seconds of the declaration of the independence.

== Feature ==
On the yard of the building stands two guardian statues of Dwarapala with heights of 2 meters (6.6 ft) and an obelisk made of andesite named Tugu Dagoba (Dagoba Monument), or Tugu Lilin (Candle Monument) by locals, which stands at 3.5 meters (11 ft) in height. In total there are 26 buildings in the palatial complex with Gedung Induk (main building) as the main audience hall for receiving guests.

== See also ==
- Bogor Palace
- Cipanas Palace
- Merdeka Palace
- State Palace (Indonesia)
- List of palaces in Indonesia
