= 1867 Java earthquake =

Earthquake in the Dutch East Indies (present-day Indonesia)

1867 Central Java earthquake
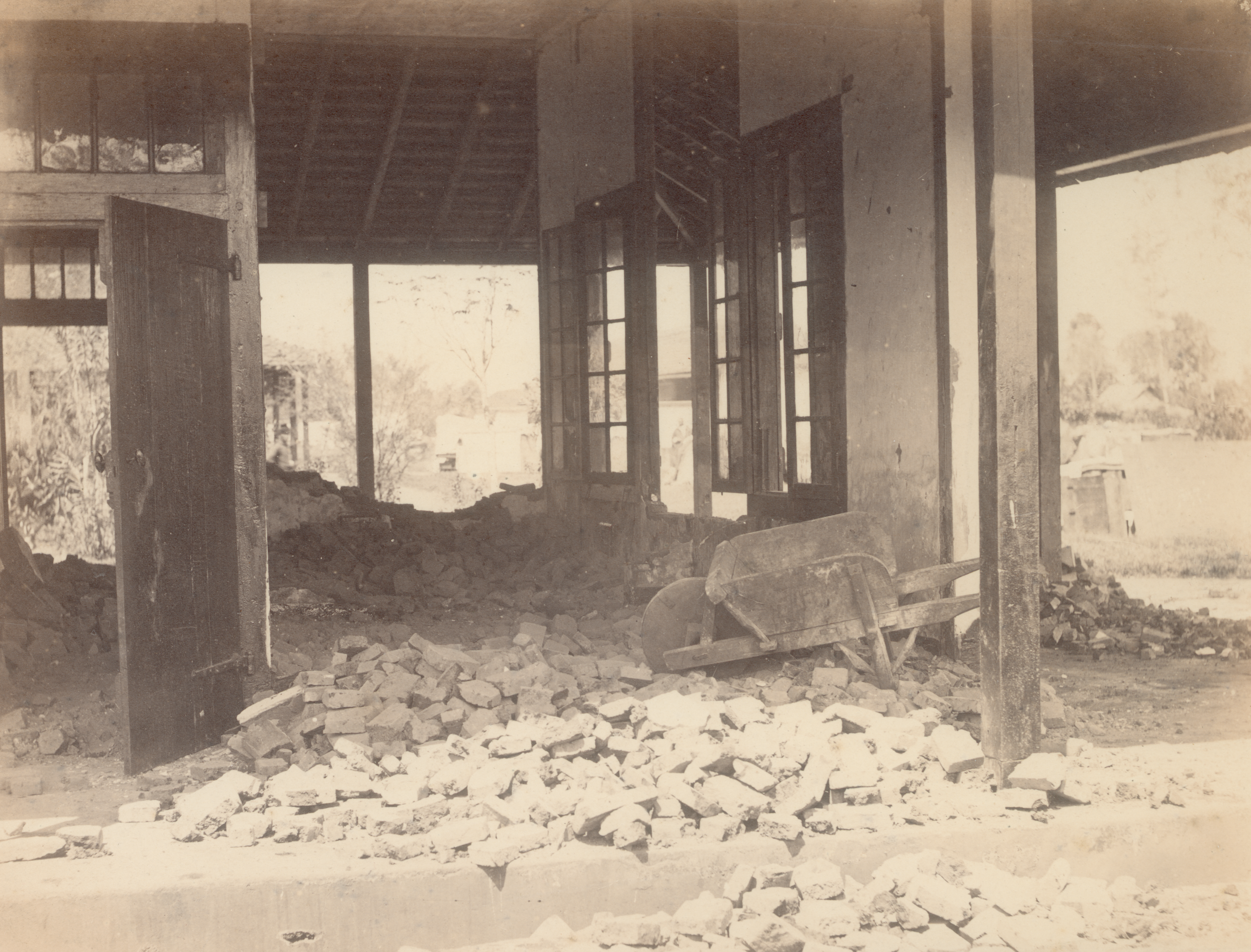
- A damaged barracks in Fort Willem I near Ambarawa

- Location within Indonesia
- Local date: June 10, 1867
- Local time: 04:20–04:30
- Magnitude: 7.8 M_{w}
- Epicenter: 8.7°S 110.6°E
- Type: Intraslab
- Areas affected: Java
- Max. intensity: MMI IX (Violent)
- Landslides: Yes
- Casualties: ≤700 dead

The 1867 Central Java earthquake occurred on June 10 at between 04:20 and 04:30 local time. It struck off the southern coast of the Indonesian island with an estimated moment magnitude of 7.8 (M_{w}). Widespread devastation occurred in Central Java, where as many as 700 people were killed. The intermediate-depth intraslab earthquake did not cause a tsunami.

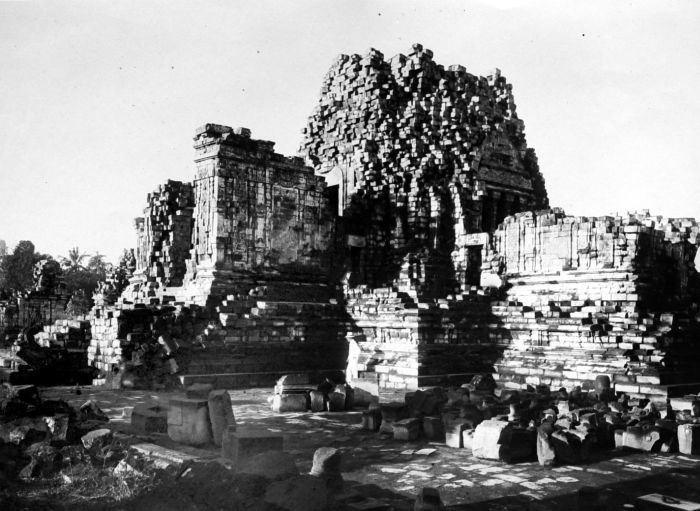
The Sewu temple ruins

== Tectonic setting ==
Off the southern coast of Java lies an active convergent boundary that separates the Sunda Plate to the north and the Australian Plate in the south. At the boundary, marked by the Sunda Trench, the northward-moving Australian Plate subducts beneath the Sunda Plate. The subduction zone is capable of generating earthquakes of up to magnitude 8.7, while the Australian Plate may also host deeper earthquakes within the downgoing lithosphere (intraslab earthquakes) beneath the coast of Java. The subduction zone produced two destructive earthquakes and tsunamis in 2006 and 1994. An intraslab earthquake in 2009 also caused severe destruction.

== Earthquake ==
The mainshock may have been accompanied by a less intense but significant foreshock on May 17, 1865, and an aftershock on March 28, 1875, respectively. These events are thought to represent seismic unrest within the subducting Australian Plate. Simulation models of a shallow crustal and large subduction zone earthquake were inconsistent with the historical reports. The lack of an observed tsunami disproves the subduction zone earthquake theory, while the shallow crustal earthquake theory is not in alignment with the tectonic understanding of the island. Modelling an intraslab earthquake of magnitude 7.8 at a depth of 80 km (50 mi) agrees with the reports of widespread, high-intensity, and heavy damage.

== Damage ==
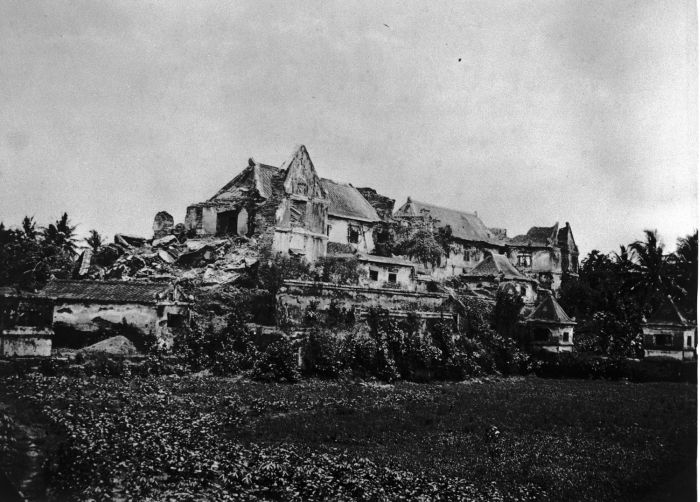
The Taman Sari after the earthquake

The earthquake was felt from Banten, in the western part of Java, to Negara, Bali, a distance of 900 km (560 mi). It was most destructive in the central and eastern parts of Java. An estimated Modified Mercalli intensity of VIII–IX (Severe–Violent) was assigned in Yogyakarta. Shaking was felt for over two minutes in some areas.

In Surakarta and Yogyakarta, approximately 372 homes were destroyed or heavily damaged. A total of 1,000 homes were destroyed. The Kraton Ngayogyakarta Hadiningrat was heavily damaged. Several buildings in the Taman Sari palace complex were destroyed. Water features in the area were drained. The damaged complex eventually became a place for squatters to reside in. The Sewu temple in Klaten suffered a complete collapse of its main dome structure. Despite the extent of damage, only five fatalities were reported, though it may be as high as 327, 500 or 700. In Surakarta, at least 236 people were killed. Twelve of the fatalities were Europeans. Four people were killed by collapsing stone construction at a camp in the Pekalongan Regency. Great damage was also reported in Bantul. At Salatiga, the earthquake caused a clock to stop at the time of its occurrence: 04:21, but the shaking lasted until 04:22.

On Mount Merapi, many landslides were triggered. Ground fissures were also observed. In the Java Sea, a seaquake was observed but there were no reports of a tsunami. Moderate damage to factory and industrial facilities was reported in Bandjardjawa. Effects from the quake were also felt on ships docked at Batavia and those located hundreds of miles away. Several houses collapsed in the Semarang Regency. In Surabaya, a church suffered cracks and a sugar factory was damaged.

In the book Raden Saleh: kehidupan dan karyanya by Werner Kraus, the death toll was in the "thousands" although no exact figure was provoded. Among the people who felt and witnessed the destruction was Alfred Russel Wallace.

== Future hazard ==
According to the simulation results, if an earthquake of the same intensity occurred today, it is estimated to cause about 60,000 deaths.

== See also ==
- List of earthquakes in Indonesia
- List of historical earthquakes
