= Istana Negara (Nusantara) =

- Istana Negara
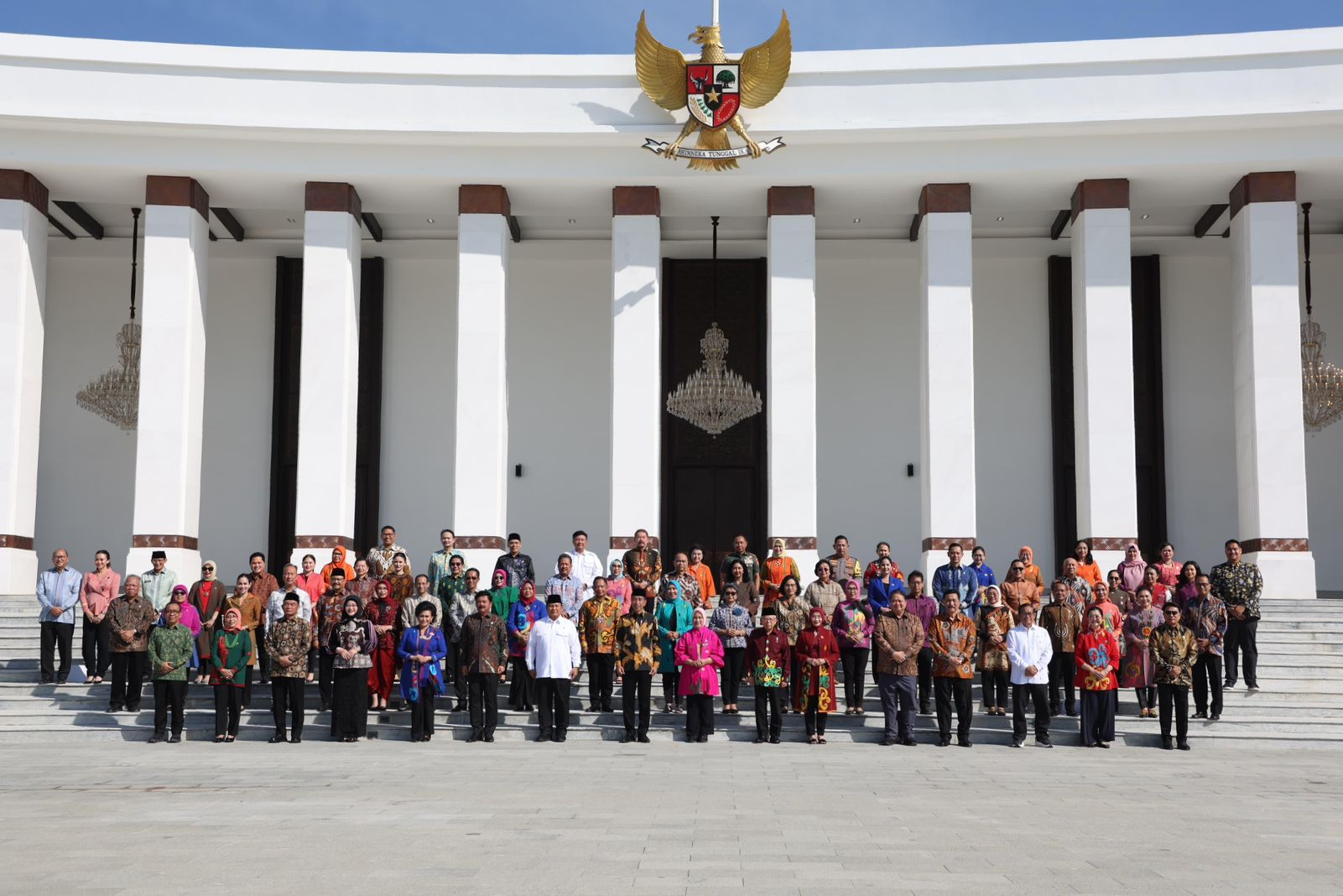
- Onward Indonesia Cabinet in front of the palace
- Interactive map of the Istana Negara area

General information
- Type: Official residence
- Location: Jalan Grande, Nusantara, Indonesia
- Coordinates: 0.960784°S 116.698094°E
- Current tenants: President of Indonesia
- Construction started: 2022
- Completed: 2024
- Owner: Government of Indonesia

Design and construction
- Architect: Nyoman Nuarta

The Istana Negara ("State Palace") is an Indonesian presidential palace located in the Central Government Core Area (KIPP) of Nusantara. It was officially inaugurated by President Joko Widodo on 11 October 2024.

The palace is situated in the lower or southeastern section of the Istana Garuda complex, a layout mirroring the relationship between the Istana Negara and the Istana Merdeka in Jakarta. The complex is built on a 100-hectare (1,000,000 m^{2}) site; 50 hectares are dedicated to the palace grounds (including Istana Garuda), while the remaining 50 hectares consist of a botanical garden.

Designed under the "smart forest city" concept, the landscaping features 40% endemic plants and 60% non-endemic species from Kalimantan. The grounds include 2,509 trees from 35 different species, 82,948 shrubs across 24 species, and Zoysia matrella grass for the flag ceremony field. Architectural details include flamed granite and andesite stone, granite planter boxes, textured paint, and various water features.

== Design ==
The Istana Negara was designed with a prominent monumental and symmetrical appearance. Its facade features 34 tall pillars finished with White Thassos marble. The windows are equipped with sun energy glass, clear glass, and bulletproof glass. The structure's walls consist of 20 cm thick concrete layered with high-craftsmanship wood carvings by artists from Java and Bali. Other wall sections are finished with woven banana fiber, porcelain tiles, marble, granite, and labradorite.

The building contains 11 primary rooms, each featuring interior concepts centered around Indonesian cultural themes:

- Great Guest Plaza: Designed with an interior concept depicting gotong royong (mutual cooperation).
- Front Terrace/Lobby: Features motifs related to mutual cooperation.
- Official Activity Room: Themed around national unity.
- Credential Room: Themed around mutual cooperation.
- Prefunction Area: Features themes of heroes and heroism.
- Audience Room: Decorated with Indonesian folklore themes.
- Banquet Hall: Centered around Indonesian Wayang.
- Meeting Room: Features Batik motifs.
- VIP Waiting Room: Decorated with Tenun (traditional weaving) themes.
- First Lady's Banquet Room: Features Batik motifs.
- Sacred Flag Room: Dedicated to the history of the Indonesian flag.
