= Nasi lengko =

Indonesian rice dish

Nasi Lengko
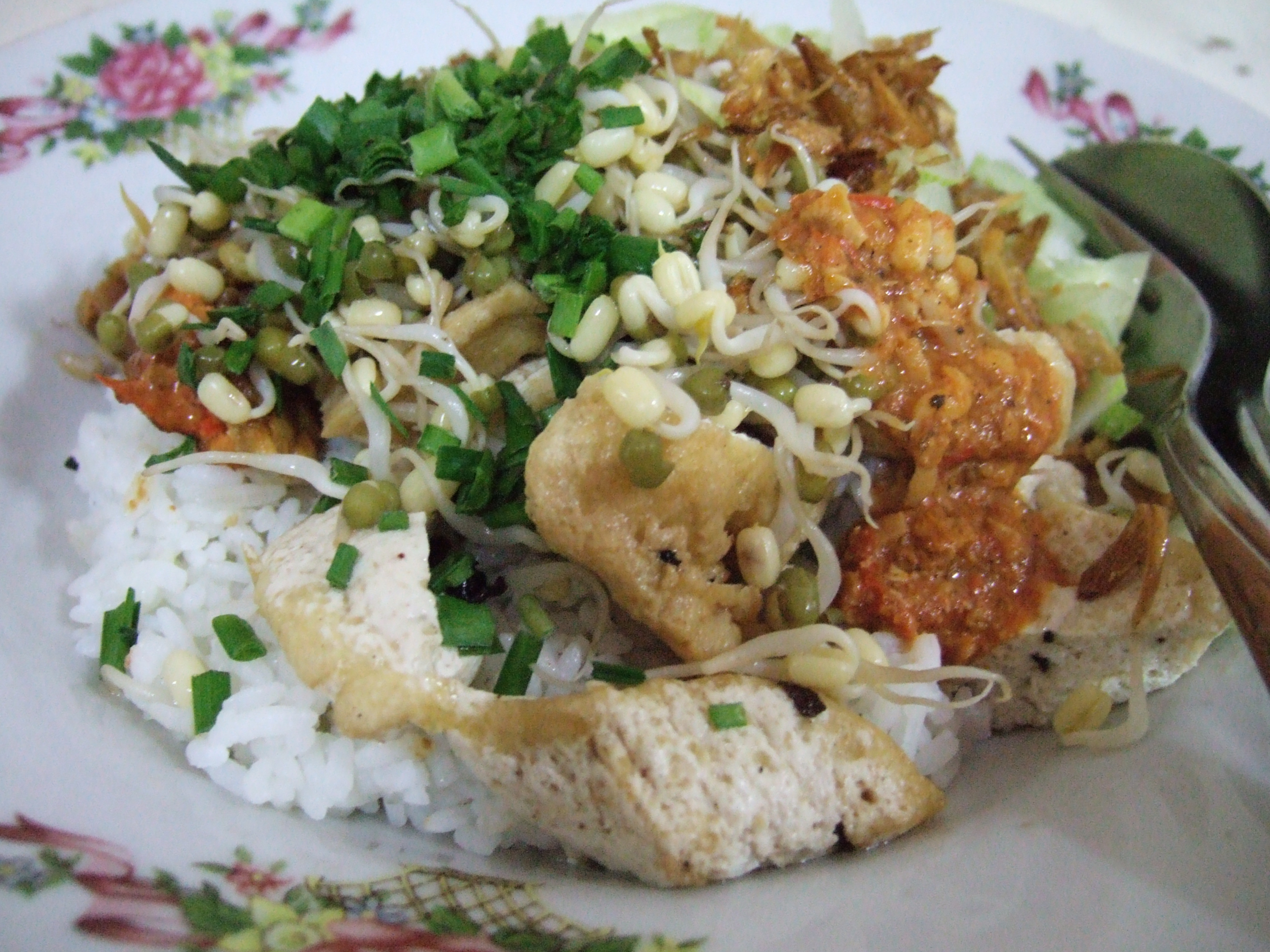
- A plate of nasi lengko
- Alternative names: Sega lengko (Cirebonese or Javanese)
- Course: Main course
- Place of origin: Indonesia
- Region or state: West Java and Central Java
- Created by: Cirebonese and Javanese
- Serving temperature: hot

Nasi lengko in Indonesian, also known as sega lengko (Lengko rice in English) is a typical dish in Cirebon, Indramayu, Brebes, Tegal and surrounding areas.

The key components of the dish are:

- white rice (ideally hot),
- fried tempeh,
- fried tofu,
- cucumbers (raw, freshly chopped),
- boiled bean sprouts,
- chives (cut into small pieces),
- fried onions,
- peanut sauce (like salad seasoning, spicy or not depending on taste),
- light soy sauce (poured over the top)

The fried tempeh and tofu are cut into small pieces and placed on a plate of rice. Chopped cucumber is sprinkled on top. Bean sprouts and peanut sauce are poured over it, with pieces of chives or spring onion leaves. After this, the soy sauce is drizzled over. Lastly, the dish is given a sprinkle of fried onions. Aci crackers, (white, round or square crackers) smeared with ketchup are a popular accompaniment to the dish.

Nasi lengko is usually served with five to ten sticks of satay on the side.

== See also ==
- Sega Jamblang
- Empal gentong
