= Cirebonese people =

Ethnic group in Indonesia

Cirebonese
ꦮꦺꦴꦁꦕꦶꦉꦧꦺꦴꦤ꧀ (Javanese) Wong Cirebon ᮅᮛᮀ ᮎᮤᮛᮨᮘᮧᮔ᮪ (Sundanese) Urang Cirebon
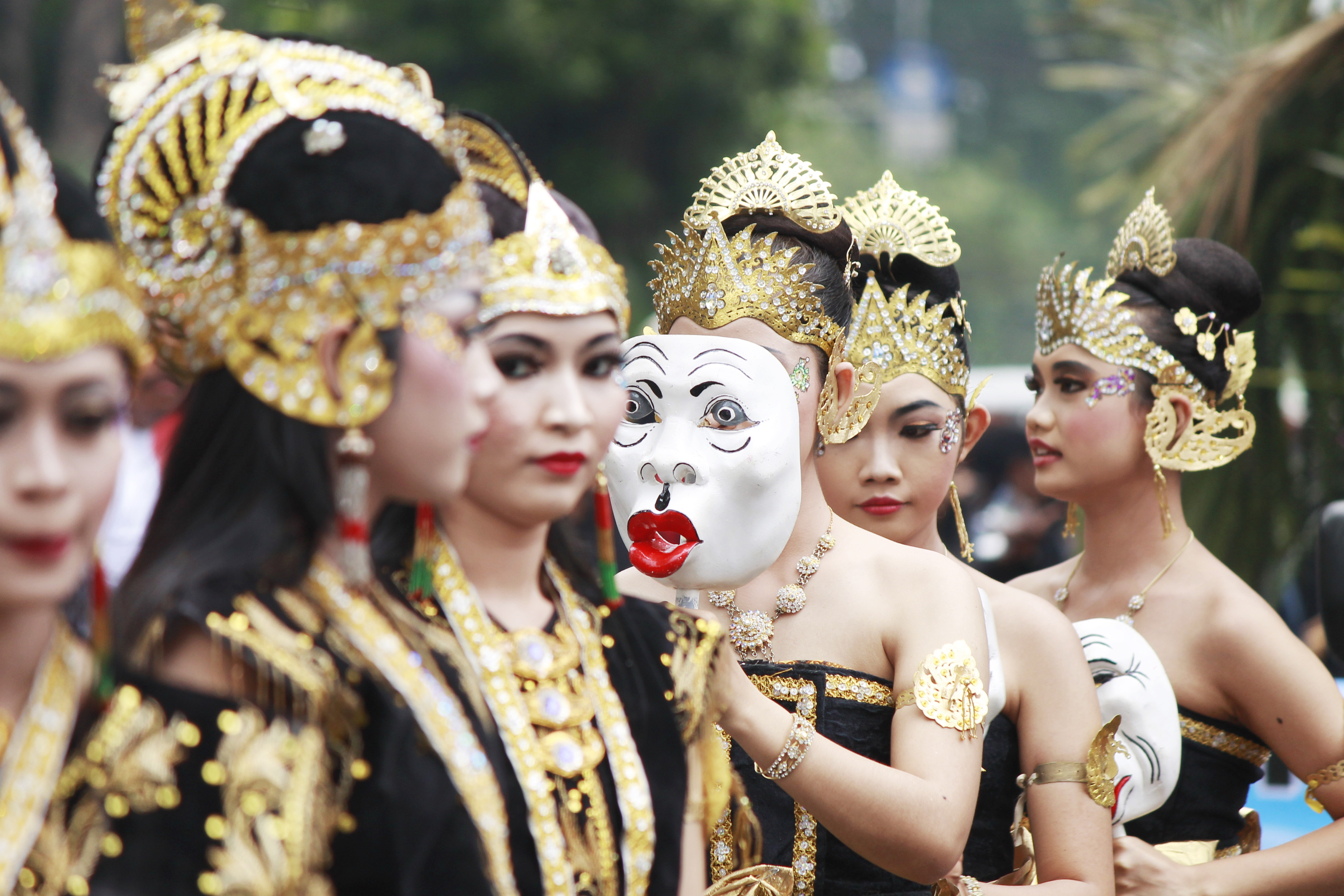
- A Cirebonese mask dancer

Total population
- 1,877,514 (2010 census)

Regions with significant populations
- Indonesia (West Java) Their population is concentrated in Ciayumajakuning/Rebana (Greater Cirebon) that including region of: Cirebon; Cirebon Regency; Indramayu Regency; small part of Kuningan Regency, Majalengka Regency, and Subang Regency

Languages
- Native: Cirebonese; Standard Cirebon; Jawareh Cirebon; Gegesik Cirebon; Dermayon Cirebon; Plered Cirebon; Bagongan Cirebon; Also: Sundanese; Javanese; Indonesian

Religion
- Sunni Islam

Related ethnic groups
- Other Javanese sub-ethnic groups such as: Osing, Banyumas, Tenggerese, etc, Sundanese

The Cirebon or Cirebonese (Javanese: ꦮꦺꦴꦁꦕꦶꦉꦧꦺꦴꦤ꧀, romanized: Wong Cirebon; Sundanese: ᮅᮛᮀ ᮎᮤᮛᮨᮘᮧᮔ᮪, romanized: Urang Cirebon; Indonesian: Orang Cirebon) are an Javanese sub-ethnic native to Cirebon in the northeastern region of West Java Province of Indonesia. With a population of approximately 2 million, the Cirebonese population are mainly adherents of Sunni Islam. Their native language is Cirebonese, which combines elements of both Javanese and Sundanese, but with a heavier influence from Javanese.

== Recognition ==
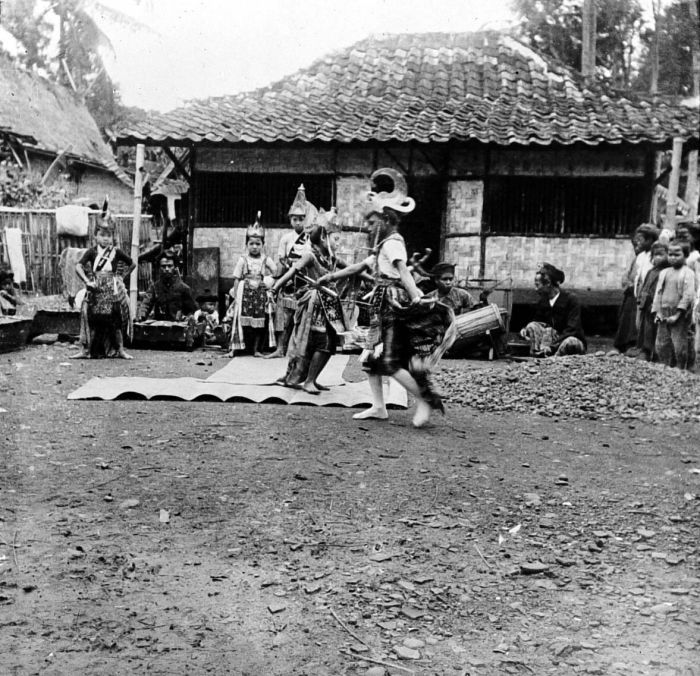
Javanese dance in a backyard in Cirebon.

Initially, Cirebonese ethnicity was closely associated with that of the Javanese people and Sundanese. However, its presence later led to the formation of its own culture, ranging from a variety of coastal batik that does not follow the standards of the Javanese palace style commonly known as interior batik, until the emergence of traditional Islamic patterns that came about following the construction of the Cirebon palace in the 15th century, which was fully based on Islam. The existence of the Cirebonese ethnic group that does not consider themselves as Javanese people or Sundanese was finally answered in the 2010 population census whereby a column that specifically mentions Cirebonese was made available (although this did not happen for Osing people, another ethnic group closely related to Javanese). This meant that the existence of the Cirebonese ethnic group has been recognized nationally as a separate tribe, according to Erna Tresna Prihatin:-

The indicators (Cirebonese tribe) seen from the local language used by the Cirebonese is not the same as with the Javanese or Sundanese people. The Cirebonese community also has a distinct identity that makes them feel as they are their own ethnicity. Other indicators that characterizes a person as a Cirebonese is the name, which is unlike of those Javanese and Sundanese people. However, there have been no further research that could explain the characteristics identity of the Cirebonese. In order to search for a person's ethnicity, it can be done through the biological patrilineal lineage. In addition, if a person identifies him or herself with the area (Cirebon) in soul and in spirit, then he or she is entitled to feel as part of the tribe in question.

== Language ==
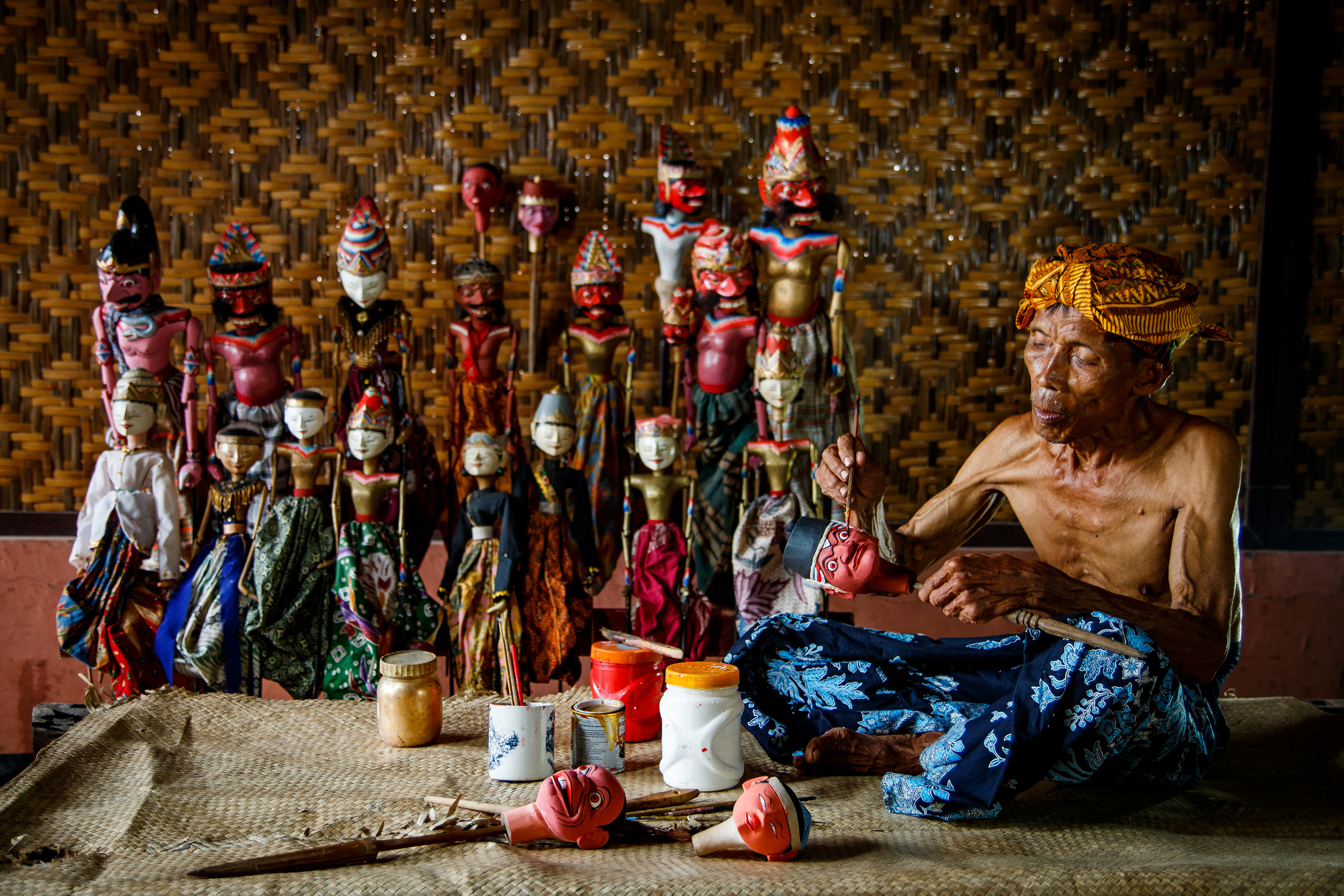
Wayang cepak, a traditional Cirebonese puppet made from wood

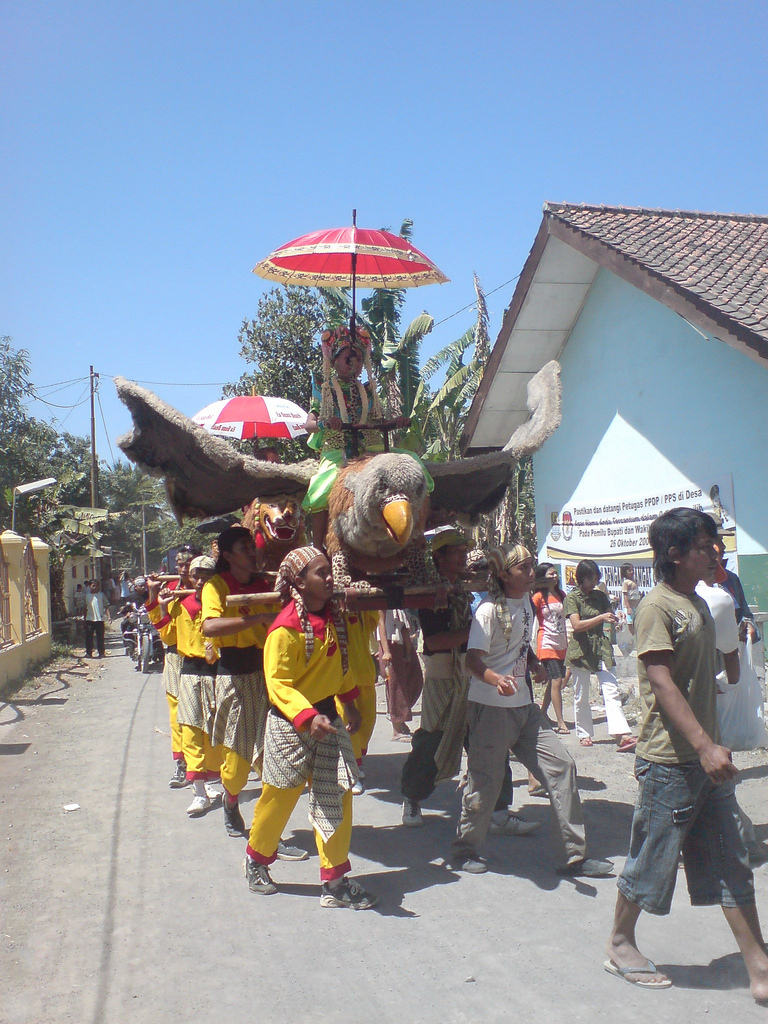
Burokan, a traditional performing arts in Cirebon

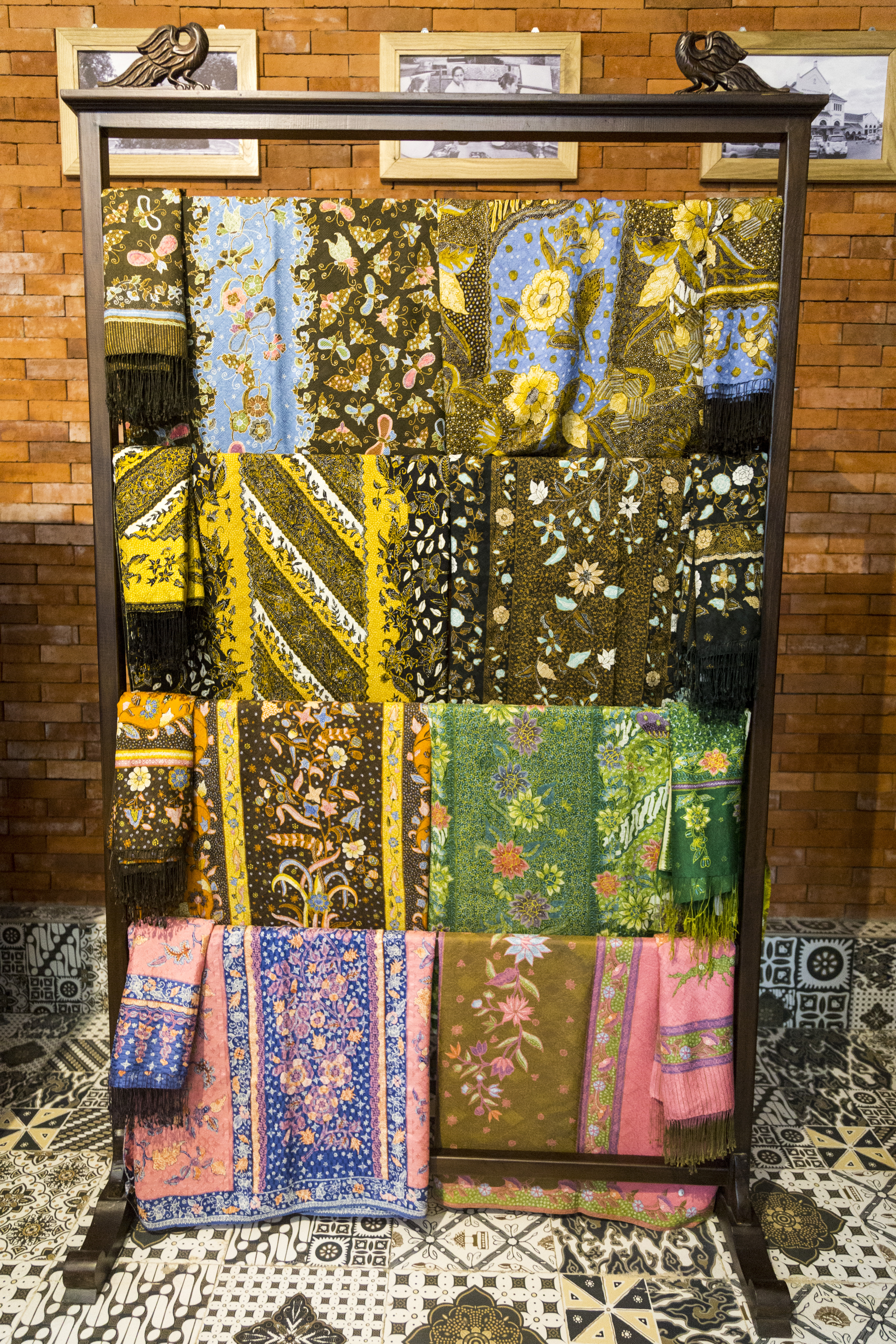
A Cirebonese batik

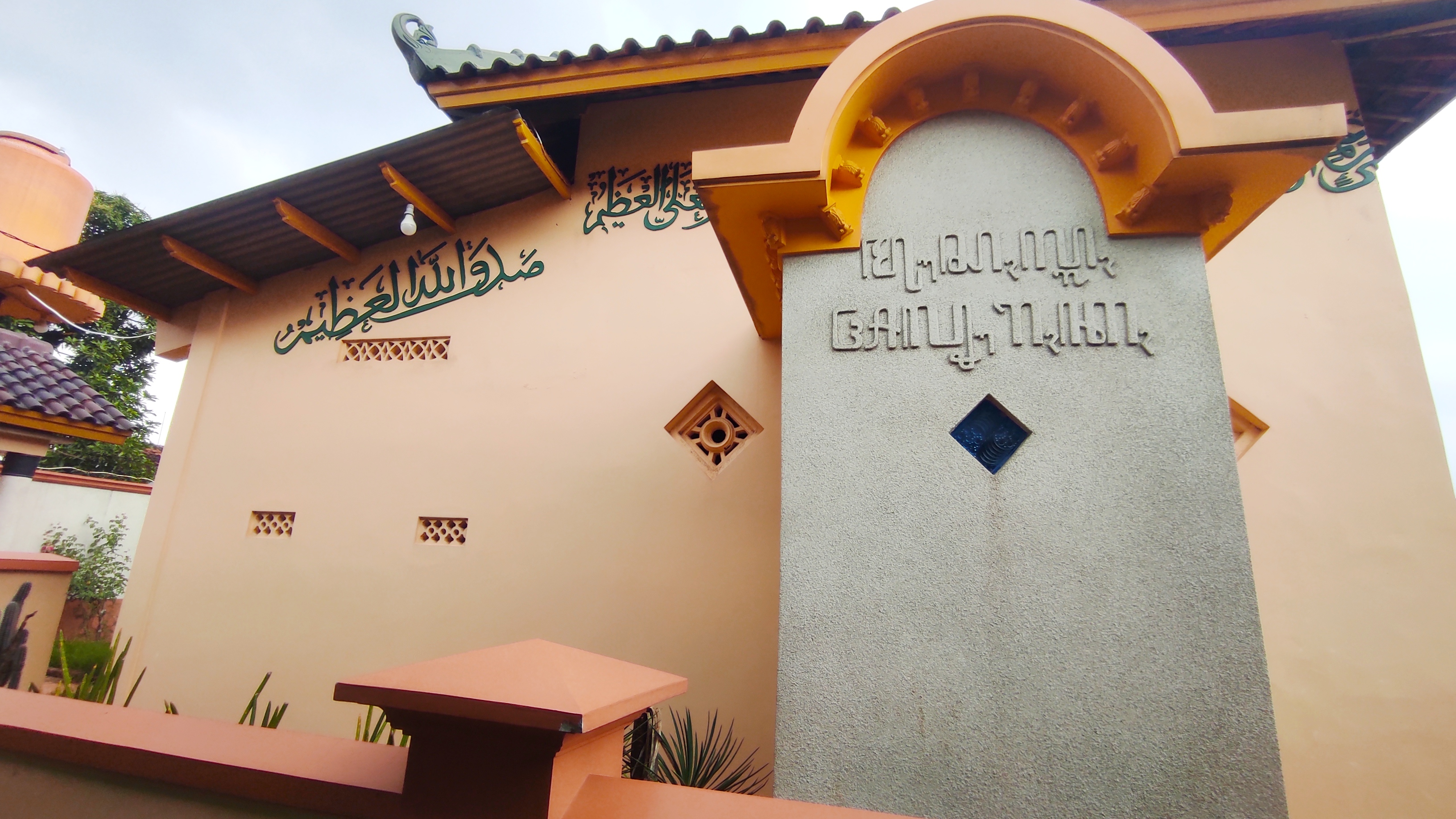
Cirebon script in a mosque

In the past, Cirebonese was used in coastal trade in West Java from Cirebon which was one of the major ports, particularly in the 15th century until the 17th century. The language is influenced by Sundanese culture since the Cirebonese are located adjacent to the Sundanese cultural region; especially Kuningan and Majalengka, and also influenced by Chinese, Arab and European culture. This is evident in words such as "Taocang" (pigtail) which is a loanword from Chinese language (Hokkien language), the word "Bakda" (after) which is from Arabic language, and then the word "Sonder" (without) which is the absorption of European languages (Dutch language). The Cirebonese language also maintains ancient forms of the Javanese language such as phrases and pronunciation, for example, "Ingsun" (I) and "Sira" (you) are words that are no longer used by the Baku Javanese language.

=== Debate ===
The question about Cirebonese as an independent language from the Sundanese and Javanese language has been a fairly long debate, and has involved political government, cultural and linguistic factors.

==== As a Javanese dialect ====
Studies made by using questionnaires as a benchmark to indicate vocabulary and basic culture (eating, drinking, and so on) based on Guiter's method showed differences in Cirebonese vocabulary with Javanese in Central Java and Yogyakarta was up to 75 percent, while differences with the Javanese language dialect in East Java was up to 76 percent.

Although linguistic research to date suggests that Cirebonese is "only" a dialect (for according to Guiter's observation, it is said that to be a separate language it must have as much as 80% differences from its closest language), to date the 5th Regional Regulation of West Java Provincial, 2003 still recognizes Cirebonese as a language of its own and not as a dialect. According to the Head of Language Bandung, Muh. Abdul Khak, it is legitimate because the regulation is based on political assessment. In the world of language according to him, a language can be recognized based on three things. First, based on the recognition by its speakers, second based on the political, and the third based on linguistics. Language is based on politics, other examples can be seen in the history of the Indonesian language. Indonesian language which stems from the Malay language, should be named the Indonesian dialect of the Malay language. However, based on political interests, eventually, the development of the Malay language in the country of Indonesia by the Indonesian government was claimed and named as Indonesian language. In addition to political reasons, the recognition of Cirebonese as a language can also be viewed from within its geographical borders. Abdul Khak mentioned that Cirebonese is regarded as a dialect if viewed nationally with the involvement of the Javanese language. This means, that when regulations were first made only within the area of West Java, Cirebonese was not regarded as significant in comparison to the Javanese language. What's more if compared with Betawi Malay and Sundanese, Cirebonese is indeed different.

==== As an independent language ====
With the revised legislation it has allowed various linguistic arguments. However, a greater interest of which is considered from the political standpoint are the Cirebonese speakers, who do not want to be regarded as Javanese or Sundanese people. Chairman of the Institute of Cirebonese Language and Literature, Nurdin M. Noer said that Cirebonese is a mixture of Javanese and Sundanese. Although in conversations, Cirebonese people can still understand some of the Javanese language, he said Cirebonese vocabulary continues to develop and does not only "depend" on the vocabulary of the Javanese nor the Sundanese language. He mentioned:

In addition, there are many dialects of the Cirebonese language. For instance the Plered, Jaware, and Dermayon dialect.

If revisions were to be made to the regulations mentioned, there would most likely be a protest from the speakers of the Cirebonese community. Linguistic expert, Chaedar Al Wasilah assessed that with the native speakers being more vocal, changes to the recognition should not be done. Therefore, what is needed is to protect the Cirebonese language from extinction.

=== Vocabulary ===
Most of the original vocabularies of this language have nothing in common with the standard Javanese language (Surakarta-Yogyakarta region) neither morphology nor phonetics. Indeed, the Cirebonese language used in Cirebon and with those in Indramayu, although are part of the Javanese language; have huge differences with the "standard Javanese language", which is the language taught in schools that held to the Solo Javanese language. Thus, before the 1970s, textbooks from Solo could no longer be used because it was too difficult for students (and perhaps also, the teacher). Therefore, in the 1970s, textbooks were replaced with Sundanese textbooks. However, it turns out that the idea was a misconception (of the Cirebonese language) until movement emerged to replace the textbook in the language used in the region, namely the Cirebonese dialect of the Javanese language. Nevertheless, publishers that supported regional language to be taught in schools did not include the word "Javanese language of the Cirebonese dialect" again in the following year, but instead used the term "Cirebonese language". It has also been done on published books by supporters of Cirebonese as a teaching subject in 2001 and 2002. "Cirebonese Language Dictionary" written by Sudjana did not put the words "Javanese language of Cirebonese dialect" but only "Cirebonese Language Dictionary". So it was with the publishing of "Wyakarana - Cirebonese Grammar" in 2002 that no longer shows the existence of Cirebonese as part of the Javanese language, but instead as an independent language itself.

==== Vernacular Cirebonese ====
Following is a comparison between Cirebonese with other languages that are considered cognate, such as Serang Javanese (Bantenese), Tegal and Pemalangan dialects of the Javanese, as well as Standard Javanese (Surakarta-Yogyakarta dialect) of the Bagongan (vernacular) style.

Cirebonese & Dermayon	Serang	Banyumasan	Tegal-Brebes	Pemalang	Surakarta-Yogyakarta	Surabaya-Malang	Indonesian	Means
kita/reang/isun	kita/kite	inyong/nyong	inyong/nyong	nyong	aku	aku	aku/saya	I
ira	sira/sire	rika	koen	koe	kowe	koen/kon/awakmu	kamu/anda	you
pisan	pisan	banget	nemen/temen	nemen/temen/teo	tenan	men	sangat	very/truly
kepriben/kepriwe	keprimen	kepriwe	kepriben/priben/pribe	keprimen/kepriben/primen/prime/priben/pribe	piye/kepriye	yaopo	bagaimana	how
ora/beli	ora/ore	ora	ora/belih	ora	ora	gak	tidak	no
rabi	rabi	kawin	kawin	kawin	kawin	kawin	kawin/nikah	married
manjing	manjing	mlebu	manjing/mlebu	manjing/mlebu	mlebu	mlebu	masuk	enter
arep/pan	arep	arep	pan	pan/pen/ape/pak	arep	katene	akan	will
sing	seka/seke	sekang	sing	kadi/kading	seko	teko	dari	from

=== Cirebonese dialects ===
According to Mr. Nurdin M. Noer, chairman of the Institute of Cirebonese Language and Literature, there are at least a few Cirebonese dialects, some of which are Cirebonese Dermayon dialect or also known as Indramayuan dialect, Cirebonese Jawareh dialect (Sawareh Javanese) or Javanese Separuh dialect, Cirebonese Plered dialect and Gegesik dialect (northern region of West Cirebon; today it is divided into Kedawung and Tengah Tani districts).

==== Jawareh dialect ====
The Jawareh dialect also referred to as Sawareh (meaning "partial", or literally "half") Javanese is a dialect of the Cirebonese language that is used around the borders of Cirebon Regency and Brebes Regency, or the borders of Majalengka Regency and Kuningan Regency. The Jawareh dialect is a combination of part Javanese language and part Sundanese language.

==== Dermayon dialect ====
The Cirebonese Dermayon dialect is widely used in the area of Indramayu Regency, according to the Guiter's method, the Dermayon dialect have about 30% differences with the Cirebonese language itself. The main characteristic of Dermayon dialect speakers is to use the word "Reang" as a term for the word "I" instead of using the word "Isun" as those used by Cirebonese language speakers.

==== Plered dialect ====
The Cirebonese Plered dialect that is used in the west side of Cirebon Regency, is known its strong use of "O" characteristic. For example, in standard Cirebonese language the word "Sira" in western Cirebon Regency dialect is translated as "Siro", which means "You". The word "Apa" in Cirebonese language becomes "Apo" (means, "What") in western Cirebonese dialect, likewise the word "Jendela" becomes "Jendelo" (means, "Window"). For instance, "anak saya masuk teka" will be translated as "anak kita manjing ning teko". Besides that Cirebonese Plered dialect has its own unique accent such as the usage of additional words like "jeh" or "tah" in any conversation. Dialect speakers who occupies the western region of Cirebon Regency tend to express themselves with the title "Wong Cirebon", which is very much different from the standard Cirebonese language (Sira) used by the residents of Cirebon city to refer to themselves as "Tiyang Grage"; although both "Wong Cirebon" and "Tiyang Grage" have the same meaning that is "Cirebonese".

==== Gegesik dialect ====
Gegesik is a dialect that is spoken in the northern region of West Cirebon and around Gegesik district, the Cirebonese Gegesik dialect is often used as the intermediary language in Pewayangan from Cirebon by the Dalang (puppet master) himself and there is a possibility that this is a finer dialect compared to the dialect of the "Wong Cirebon" itself.

==== Comparison of dialects ====
Standard Cirebonese	Indramayu dialect	Plered dialect	Ciwaringin dialect	Indonesian	English
Ana (vernacular)	Ana	Ano	Ana	Ada	There is
Apa (vernacular)	Apa	Apo	Apa	Apa	What
Bapak (vernacular)	Bapak	Mama' / Bapa	Bapa / Mama	Bapak	Father
Beli (vernacular)	Ora	Beli	Beli / Ora	Tidak	No
Dulung (vernacular)	Dulang	Dulang	Muluk	Suap (Makan)	Feed (To eat)
Elok (vernacular)	Sokat	Lok	Sok	Pernah	Ever / Did before
Isun (vernacular)	Reang	Isun	Isun / Kita	Saya	I
Kula (loosed)	Kula	Kulo	Kula	Saya	I
Lagi apa? (vernacular)	Lagi apa?	Lagi apo?	Lagi apa?	Sedang apa?	What's up? / What are you up to?
Laka (vernacular)	Laka	Lako / Langko	Laka	Tidak ada	Don't have
Paman (vernacular)	Paman	Paman	Mang	Paman	Uncle
Salah (vernacular)	Salah	Salo	Salah	Salah	Wrong
Sewang (vernacular)	Sewong	Sawong	-	Seorang (Masing-masing)	Alone (Each one)

=== Family system ===
Below are the terms used by Cirebonese people to address family members:

Cirebonese dialects	Father	Mother	Son	Elder brother	Younger brother	Daughter	Elder sister	Younger sister	Grandfather	Grandmother	Uncle / aunty	Greatgrand parents
Lor sub-dialect of Plered dialect	Mama / Mamo	Mimi	Lanang	Aang / Kakang lanang	Kacung / Adi lanang	Wadon	Yayu / Kakang wadon	Nok / Adi wadon	Mama tuwa / Bapa tuwa / Bapo tuwo	Mimi tuwa / Mbok tuwa / Mbok tuwo	Uwa	Buyut
Kidul sub-dialect of Pleret dialect (Plumbon district)	Mama / Mamo	Mimi	Lanang	Aang / Kakang lanang	Kacung / Adi lanang	Wadon	Yayu / Kakang wadon	Nok / Ado wadon	Mama gede / Mamo gede / Made	Mimi gede / Mide	Uwo / Uwa	Buyut
Dermayu dialect	Bapa	Mak	Senang / Enang	Akang	Adi	Nok	Yayu	Nok	Bapa tuwa	Mak tuwa	Wa / Uwa	Yut / Uyut
Cirebonese (loosed)	Rama	Mimi	Kacung	Kakang / Raka ("Raka" is adopted from Javanese language)	Rayi	Nok	Yayu	Yayi	Ki	Nini	Wa / Uwa	Yut / Uyut
Bagongan Cirebonese (Vernacular)	Mama	Mimi	Kacung	Aang	Ari	Nok	Yayu	Nok	Aki	Nini	Wa / Uwa	Yut / Uyut

== Culture ==
=== Customs ===
==== Royal Wedding ====
The Royal Wedding custom of the Cirebonese community is called Pelakrama Ageng in Cirebonese language. The customs of marriage attempts to elevate local traditions with the emphasis on Islam as the center of the ceremony. The customs of Cirebonese wedding has its own local moral values in the context of the simplicity in the Cirebonese community way of carrying out large celebrations. Such example is in the Cirebonese dowry customs which only requires tubers, vegetables and valuables (as in the form of jewelry or cash according to the groom's means), where in carrying out those requirements Cirebonese community will prioritize Islamic elements more than others; and among them is to avoid ria (the attitude of wanting to be praised).

===== Marriage proposal =====
A marriage proposal or in Cirebonese language tetali or njegog is the early stage of the Cirebonese Royal Wedding procession whereby the messenger of the man visits the parents of the woman's house and expressed his intention to marry their daughter. Then the woman's mother would ask her for her approval. The woman will then give her answer in the presence of the messenger as a witness. After receiving the answer, the messenger and the woman's parents will have a discussion to determine the wedding date. Once there is agreement, the messenger excuse himself to convey the message to the man's parents.

===== Dowry =====
On the day of delivering the dowries, the woman's parents accompanied her immediate family members will receive the man's messenger as he arrives together with his envoy accompanied a group men carrying the dowry; among them are:-

- Fruit bearers
- Tubers bearers
- Vegetables bearers
- Mas picis bearers, which are dowries in a form of jewelries and cash that are to be handed over to the woman's parents.

===== Washing =====
According to Sultan Sepuh XIV Pangeran Raja Adipati Arief Natadiningrat, Siraman (meaning, "splashing of water" or "washing" and sometimes also referred to as Siram Tawandari) symbolizes purity. The Siraman procession is a tradition of bathing the bride with a certain traditional procedure takes place before proceeding with the solemnization ceremony. It aims to cleanse the body and soul of the bride before conducting the ceremony, which is the door to starting a new life with her partner.

As according to the teachings of Islam, that good deeds must be preceded by cleansing themselves of impurity, be it both small or great.

In Islam, all of us who wants to worship must certainly begins with self-cleaning. Siraman is also a way of self-cleaning, and getting married is part of worship. So, before getting married a need for Siraman is done first so that both body and soul will be cleanse.

Both the bride and groom will be brought to the place for Siraman, called cungkup by the makeup person, accompanied by their parents and elders. As they walk towards the place for Siraman accompanied with traditional musical instruments; the nablong, the bride will wear a batik sarong of Cirebonese style, namely the Wadasan cloth. Usually the color of the sarong is green which symbolizes fertility. Before Siraman, the chest and back of the bride will be given scrubs and after which the makeup person will then invite the parents and elders to wash the bride alternately. Once completed, the water that is used to wash the bride will be given to young girls and boys who were present as a symbolic meaning that they should follow the examples of the bride and groom. This ceremony is called Bendrong Sirat where the water used for the Siraman are sprinkled to the young girls and boys who attended the event.

===== Titivate =====
To ornate or in Cirebonese language called Parasan is done by the prospective bride after the Siraman ceremony. One of the Parasan process called ngerik where the removal of fine hair done by the makeup person as the parents and relatives watch. This event accompanied by moblong, a karawitan music which means the fountain of water is like a full moon.

===== Visiting graves =====
Visiting of tomb (ziarah) is normally done to offer prayers for ancestors who have already gone. Usually if the bride is a descendant of the Cirebonese Sultanate, the bride will make a visit to the tomb of Sunan Gunung Jati tomb and the ancestral tomb of the Cirebonese sultans at the Astana Gunung Jati Tomb of the Cirebonese Kings Complex in Astana village, Gunung Jati district, Cirebon Regency to receive blessings before proceeding with the marriage ceremony.

Visitation of the Astana Gunung Jati Tomb of the Cirebonese Kings Complex begins by praying in front of the pasujudan gate. The door is the third of the nine doors leading to the tomb of Sunan Gunung Jati that seats at the top of the hill. Apart from praying in front of the pasujudan door, usually Sultan Sepuh of the Kasepuhan palace and the bride will also spread flower petals and offer prayer in the tombs of the elders of Kasepuhan palace; and among them are Sultan Sepuh Raja Sulaiman and Sultan Sepuh PRA Maulana Pakuningrat. The visitation ends at the time for Salat Zuhr prayer.

===== Fetching the bride =====
When the wedding day arrives as agreed, representatives of the bride will send emissaries to fetch the groom. Once arrive at the home of the groom's family and the messenger delivers his message with the intention to bring the prospective groom to the bride's home for a wedding ceremony. Parents of the groom are not allowed participate in the marriage ceremony as it is forbidden for them to witness.

Once the consent has been granted by the parents of the bride (Ijab Kabul), the groom will be covered with a cloth belonging to the bride's mother. This signifies that the groom has become a son-in-law. After it has been done, the cloth will be taken back to indicate that the bride is no longer in the protection of her parents and now has to carry her own responsibility. Ijab Kabul in Royal Wedding or Pelakrama Ageng of the Cirebonese palace is usually conveyed in loosed Cirebonese language.

===== Meeting the bride =====
Once the solemnization ceremony is completed, they will proceed with the meeting of the bride and the bridegroom ceremony which is referred to as Temon or Salam Temon. Both the bride and the bridegroom will be brought to the front porch or doorway of the house for a stepping on eggs event. The egg made up of shell, egg white and egg yolk bears its own symbolic meaning:-

Egg shell as a vessel or place, egg white as purity and devotion of the wife, and egg yolk as a symbol of grandeur. With so all the purity and majesty of his wife from that moment on wards belonged to her husband. Among the tools that are used are the pipisan (a type of millstone) or a rectangular stone that is wrapped in white cloth. The bridegroom will step on the eggs symbolize the change status of a young man to a husband and wants to start a home and have children of his own.

The bride will then wash the feet of her husband, to symbolize loyalty and wants to build a happy home together. Before washing the feet of her husband, the bride will ask for blessings from her husband. When the bride is from a well-off families usually during the Salam Temon ceremony, the gelondongan pangareng will be carried out as well which is the complete delivering of tribute of goods (valuables).

===== Spreading of money =====
This event is held as a form of parents expressing their happiness for the marriage of their children. Coins that are mixed with yellow rice and turmeric are spread, or in Cirebonese language it is called Sawer, as a sign so that the bride and groom are given an abundance of fortune, attain mutual respect, live in harmony and are well-suited for each other. Normally when coins are sprinkled or spread, noises of excitement are heard of those that were rushing for the money, yellow rice and turmeric. Those noise of excitement is what is referred to as Surak.

===== Sprinkling of Pugpugan =====
In a squatting position, the head of the bride and bridegroom are sprinkled with pugpugan by the makeup person. The pugpugan is made of welit; which is either ilalang or fermented coconut leaves. The purpose of this ceremony is done for a long lasting marriage just as the welit are tied tightly until it is fermented, and for both of the bride and bridegroom to be able to make a full use of the sustenance that they are blessed with. Once the ceremony is completed by the makeup person, the bride and bridegroom are bought into the aisle. Parents of the bridegroom are then invited by relatives of the bride to accompany the bride and bridegroom in the aisle.

===== Partaking of yellow sticky rice =====
Partaking of the nasi ketan kuning (yellow sticky rice) by the bride and bridegroom ceremony is led by the makeup person. The nasi ketan kuning is arranged in a circle of 13 grains of rice. First, the parents of the bride feeds the bride and bridegroom with a total of 4 grains. Then, another 4 grains are fed to the bride and bridegroom by the parents of the bridegroom. Followed by the bride and bridegroom feeding each other with total of 2 grains. The remaining 1 grain of rice is to be contested and it symbolizes whoever manages to get the last grain of rice will be blessed abundantly.

However, the last grain of rice is not to be consumed but to be given to his or her spouse. During the event, both of the bride and bridegroom are seated in front as a symbol of a united husband and wife in building a happy family. Apart from that, this event; which is also called adep-adep sekul, bears the meaning of harmony in the family among the couple, parents and parents-in-law.

===== Parental blessings =====
Both of the bride and bridegroom pays homage to their parents by kneeling as a reflection of their respect and gratitude to their parents for all the love and guidance that has been devoted to them. The bride and groom also ask for blessings to build their own household with their spouse. After this ceremony, a love song with advice in a form of macapat is played with the hope the bride and bridegroom are able to manage their household in agreement, in life and in death with one another.

===== Closing =====
After receiving the blessings of their parents, the bride and bridegroom are then congratulated by relatives that are present. Usually, entertainment such as dancing are held. For example, Cirebon mask dance, Cirebonese cultural dance and Tayub dance.

=== Art ===
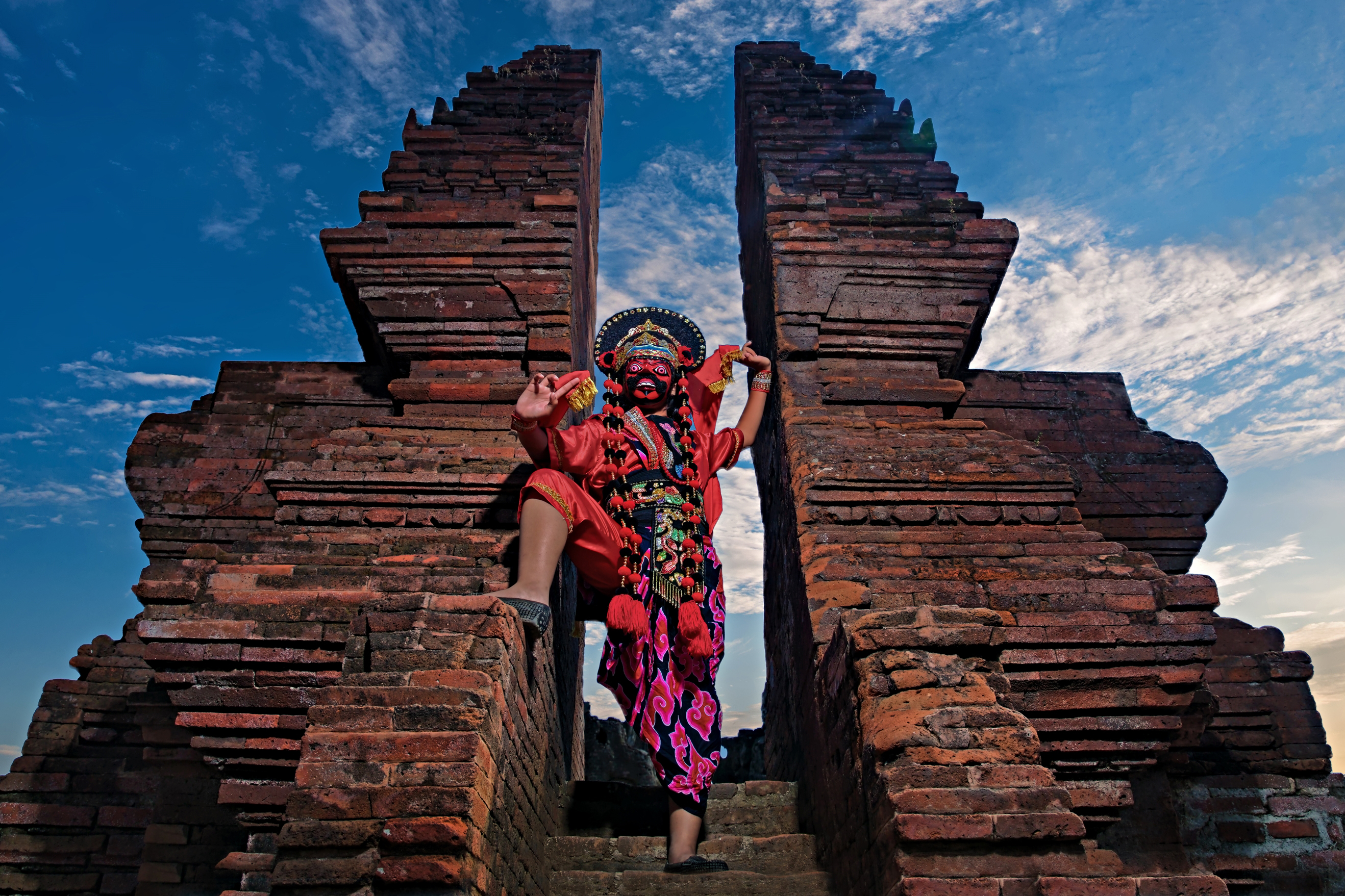
Cirebonese mask dance

- Cirebon mask dance
- Gamelan Sekaten
- Kemanak

=== Cuisine ===
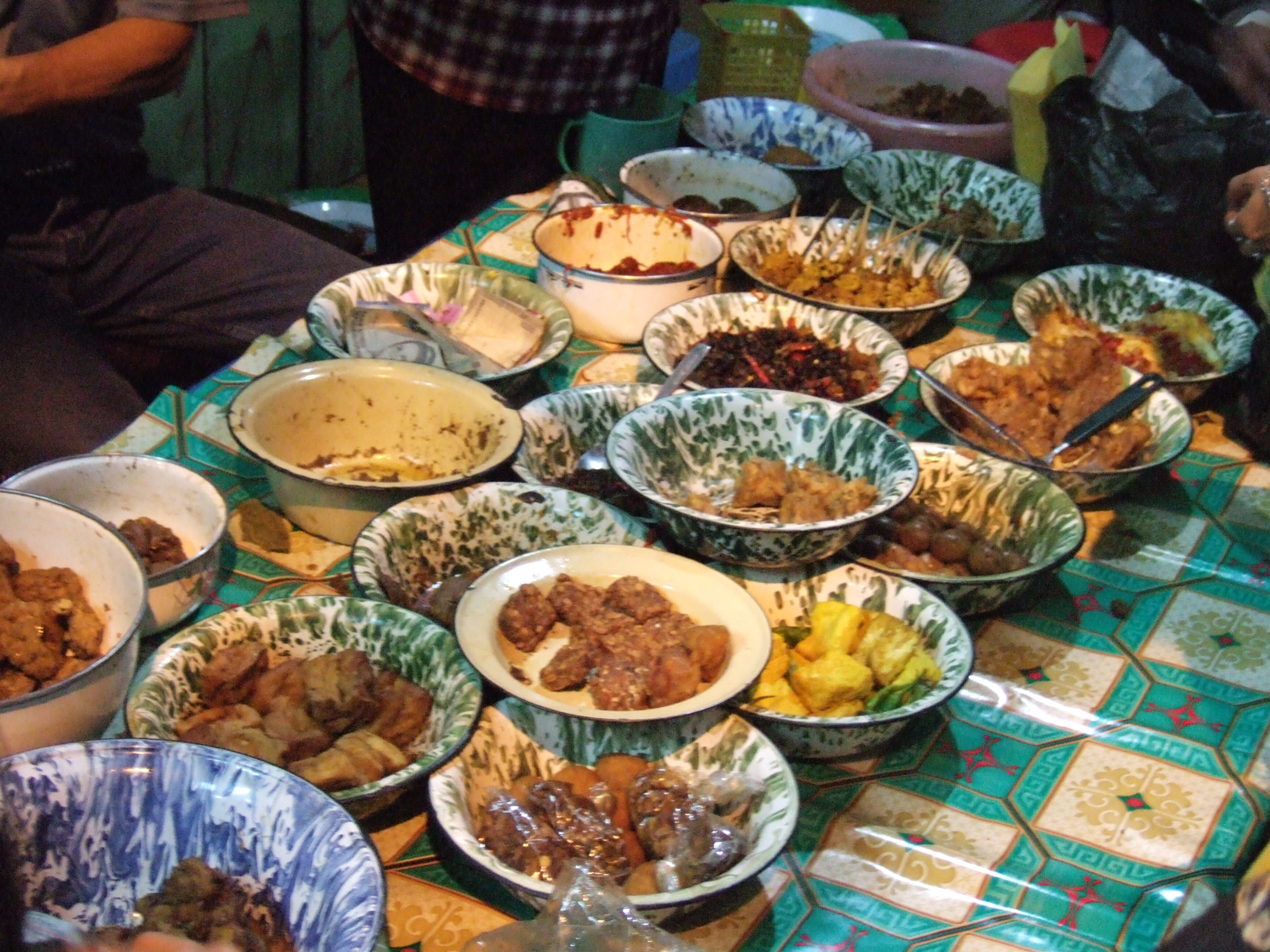
Nasi jamblang

- Docang
- Empal gentong
- Mie koclok
- Sega jamblang
- Tahu gejrot

== Relation to Javanese culture ==
In relation to Javanese culture, the existence of Cirebonese language has always been associated with the Javanese language due to the Cirebonese grammar that is similar to the Javanese grammar, as well as the existence of several words in the Cirebonese language also shares the same meaning in Javanese language.

For example "Isun arep lunga sing umah" in Cirebonese language means "I want to leave from home" where if translated in Javanese language it is "I arep lungo sing umah". Words obtained in both translations are almost similar but the variety of sentences in Cirebonese language is not limited to only from the absorption of Javanese language. An example of a variant dialect in Cirebonese language, "ari khaul mulae bakda magrib mah punten, isun beli bisa teka, ana janji sih karo adhine". The word "ari" that is found in the sentence is an uptake of the Sundanese language and the word "bakda" is an absorption of the Arabic language. Where if translated into standard Sundanese language or standard Javanese language, a different variety of vocabulary will be found from the Cirebonese sentences.

== Relation to Sundanese culture ==
In relations with Sundanese people or culture, the existence of the Cirebonese people is marked in a form of the existence of the Cirebon palace; where the founders of the Cirebon palace namely Raden Walangsungsang, Nyai Rara Santang and Prince Surya are the Kuwu (Cirebonese term of head of settlement) in Kaliwedi district are the descendants of the Pajajaran kingdom of the Kingdom of Sunda. However, in the subsequent development of the Cirebon palace; which is the symbol of existence of Cirebonese people, chose its own path which is mostly patterned after Islam.

== See also ==
- Sultanate of Cirebon
