= Sunjaya Purwadisastra =

Indonesian politician

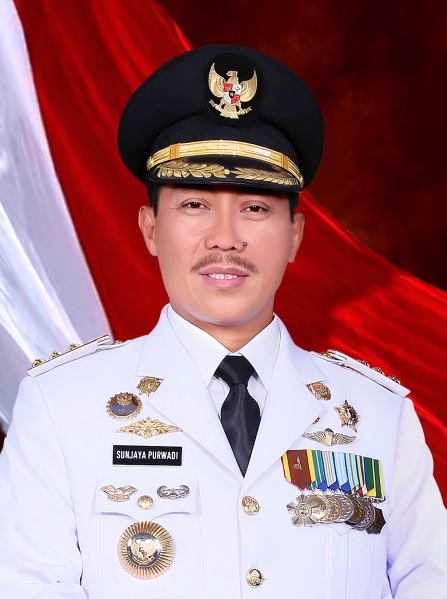

27th Regent of Cirebon
- In office 19 March 2014 – 19 March 2019
- Preceded by: Dedi Supardi
- Succeeded by: Imron Rosyadi

Personal details
- Born: 1 June 1965 (age 61) Palimanan, Cirebon, Indonesia
- Party: PDI-P (until 2018)

Military service
- Branch/service: Indonesian Army
- Years of service: 1998–2012
- Rank: First lieutenant

Sunjaya Purwadisastra (born 1 June 1965) is an Indonesian politician from Indonesian Democratic Party of Struggle (PDI-P) who was the regent of Cirebon Regency, West Java. First elected in 2013 and sworn into his position in 2014, he was reelected in the 2018 election and was arrested as a graft suspect by the Corruption Eradication Commission before he was sworn in for his second term.

== Early life and education ==
Sunjaya Purwadisastra was born in Cirebon Regency on 1 June 1965 as the son of a village chief. After completing basic education, he graduated with a bachelor's degree in administrative sciences in 1995 and later in economics in 2000. He also studied at the University of Indonesia and obtained a doctorate in 2017 from Indonesia's Home Government Institute (Institut Pemerintah Dalam Negeri).

== Career ==
He joined the Indonesian Army in 1998, becoming a first lieutenant and was assigned as adjutant by 2008. He resigned from the army in 2012, and entered politics by joining PDI-P.

=== As regent ===
After failing as an independent candidate in Cirebon's 2008 regency election, Purwadisastra was first elected as regent in 2013 when he won the regency election after securing 403,933 votes (53.43%). Following his victory in the election, it was made public that Purwadisastra had entered the military court for his participation in the 2008 election due to issues with permits from his superiors to participate, and was placed on six months' disciplinary punishment after the court could not prove any wrongdoing. He was sworn in on 21 March 2014.

Purwadisastra expressed interest to run in the 2017 Jakarta gubernatorial election, though ended up not running. He was also accused of having mobilized thugs to disperse a communal prayer which concerned the corrupt regency government. In the 2018 Cirebon Regency election, Purwadisastra ran for a second term and secured a victory, following a lawsuit in the Constitutional Court of Indonesia which accused the sitting government of mobilizing public servants.

== Corruption case ==
On 24 October 2018, Purwadisastra was caught red-handed by the Corruption Eradication Commission (KPK), and was accused of having received bribes for positions in the local government. Just before the arrest, he had just auctioned seven positions and rotated 592 civil servants. The following day on 25 October 2018, Chief of PDI-P West Java Regional Branch, Tubagus Hasanuddin said that Sunjaya was officially fired from his party membership because he was caught in a red-handed operation by the KPK.

"This case (Operation Hand Catching) is regrettable, of course the party has consistently dismissed Sunjaya from membership as of today," said Tubagus Hasanuddin in Cirebon, Thursday (25/10)

"Because we have been fired from membership, we are not thinking about legal assistance (to Sunjaya). We respect and support the process carried out by the KPK. So let it go," said Tubagus Hasanuddin in Cirebon, Thursday (25/10/2018).

"I just got it from the media last night and immediately cross-checked with colleagues in Cirebon, it turned out that Sunjaya, Cirebon Regent's brother, had been arrested by the KPK," said Tubagus Hasanuddin.

After his trial concluded and he was sentenced, he was still sworn in as regent on 17 May 2019, but was immediately removed from his post some 15 minutes after.

== Personal life ==
Purwadisastra married Wahyu Tjiptaningsih in 1996, and the couple has four children.
