= Docang =

Indonesian traditional dish

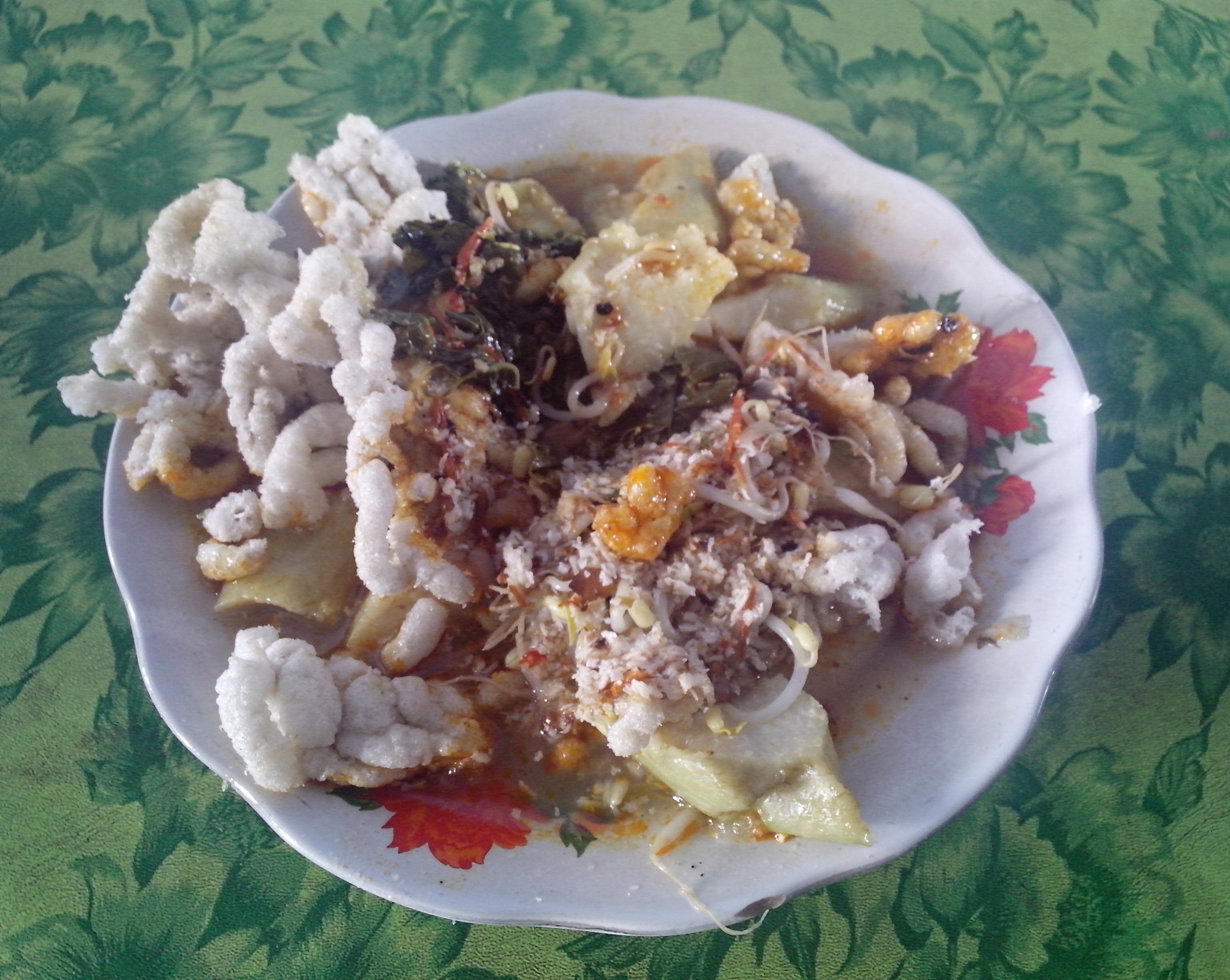
Docang, a traditional Cirebon food commonly served for breakfast.

Docang or Doclang is a traditional food from Cirebon, a port town in West Java, Indonesia. The dish has a history with the arrival and spread of Islam in Java, allegedly favored as a morning meal along the Walisongo (nine saints) during their propagation of the faith. Unlike many modern foods that rely on heavy spices, docang uses local ingredients from the coast. It is made of sliced of rice cake, cassava leaves, and bean sprouts.The broth is its main selling point, which is savory and pungent vegetable gravy known as dage or oncom sauce. This signature sauce is created from fermented soybean cake that is mashed and simmer with grated cocnut, shallots, garlic, and herbs. It is often topped with crushed crackers (krupuk), served in thick vegetable sauce called dage, which is made of mashed tempeh mixed with grated coconut.

This food has a distinctive savoury flavor and usually served warm for breakfast and it is sold in relatively affordable price. Despite historical significance, authentic docang is rarely found even in Cirebon. The rise of fast food and laborious preparation used to make the dage broth has led many vendors to retire without successors to continue the dish. It is typically served in roadside stalls as a breakfast if one were able to find it.

== Etymology ==
It is unsure where "Doclang" came from, but it is believed to be a twisted version of the Dutch word "Dutchland" while the second version believes doclang is a abbreviation of the Sundanese phrase "Bumbu Ledok" Ngango Kacang" which translates to thick seasoning using peanuts.

== Variants ==
=== Doclang ===
A variant of the dish, doclang comes from the Bogor, it resemebles a peanut-sauce dish, similar to ketopak or kupat tahu. The name is an abbreviation of medok kacang. It features slices of rice cake, fried yellow tofu, boiled potatoes and eggs, with a thick, dark peanut sauce by sautéing shallots and bird's eye chillies before blending them with roasted peanuts. It has a wrapper, called the presor. The wrapper is used in doclang is distinct because comes from Mount Salak which gives the rice cake a unique aroma.

== See also ==
- Sega Jamblang
- Empal gentong
