= 2024 Cirebon regency election =

Local election in Indonesia

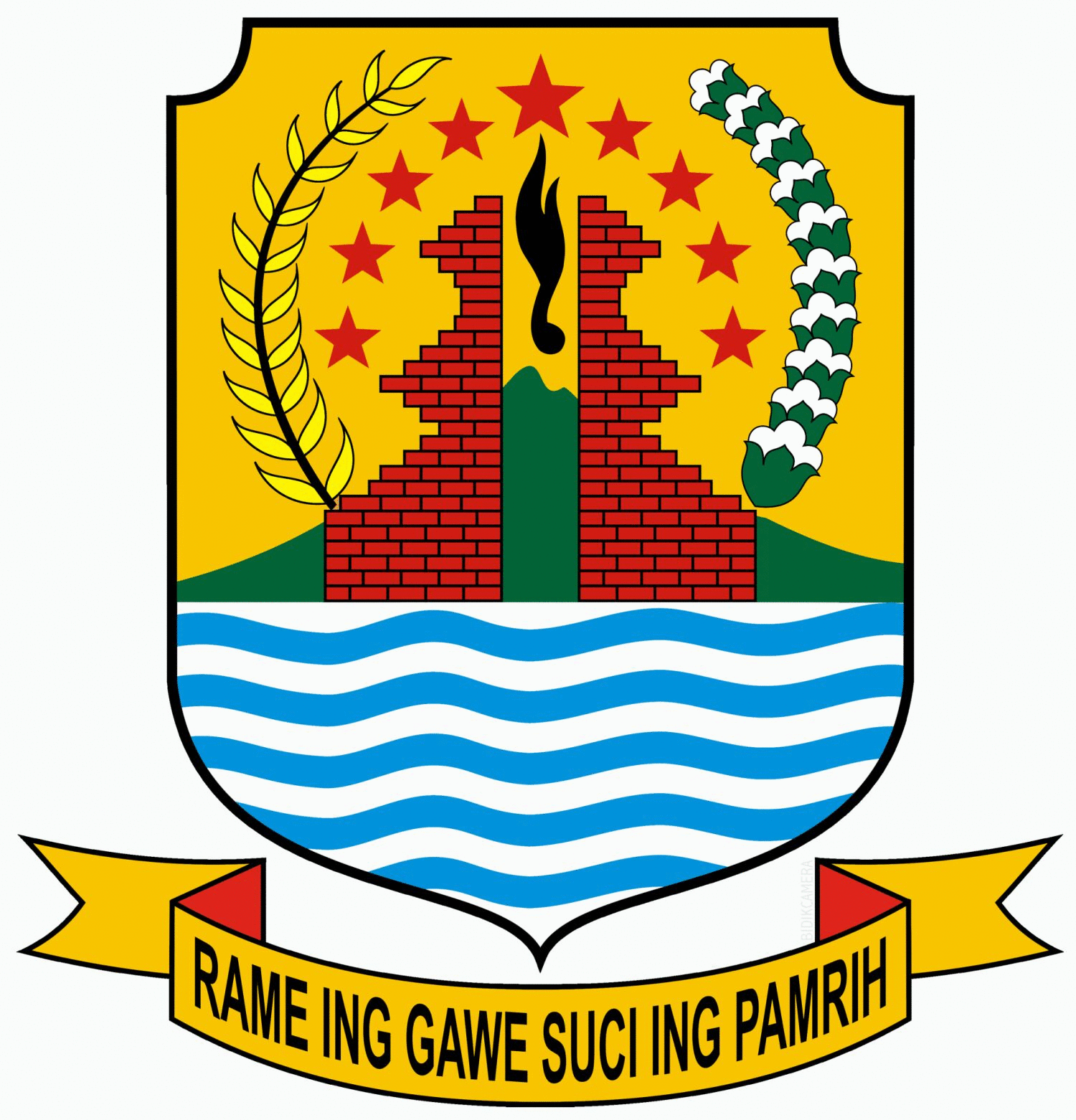
- 27 November 2024
- Registered: 1,744,235
- Turnout: 59.54%
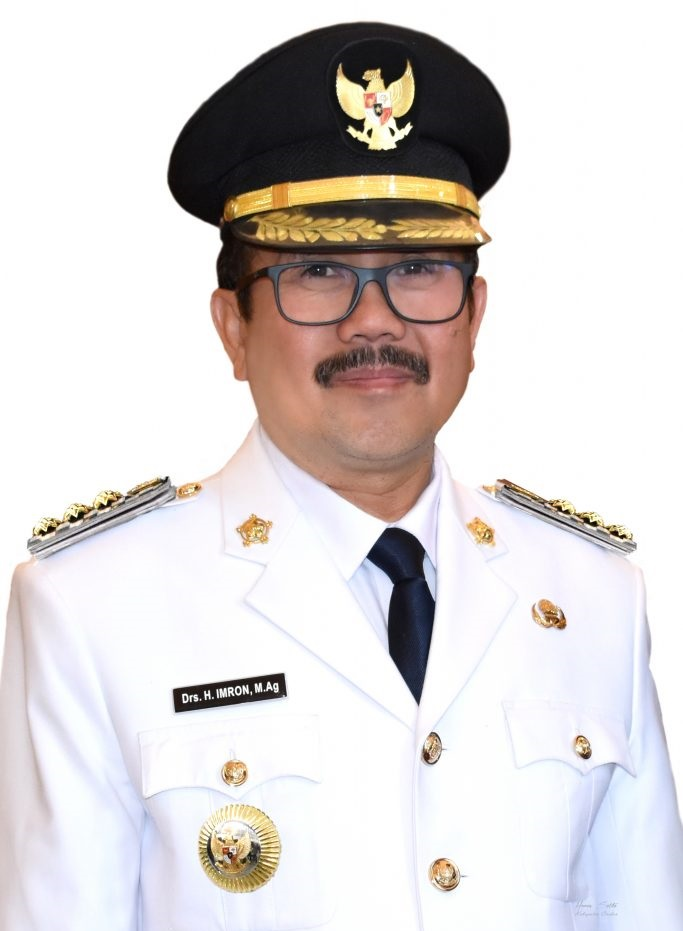

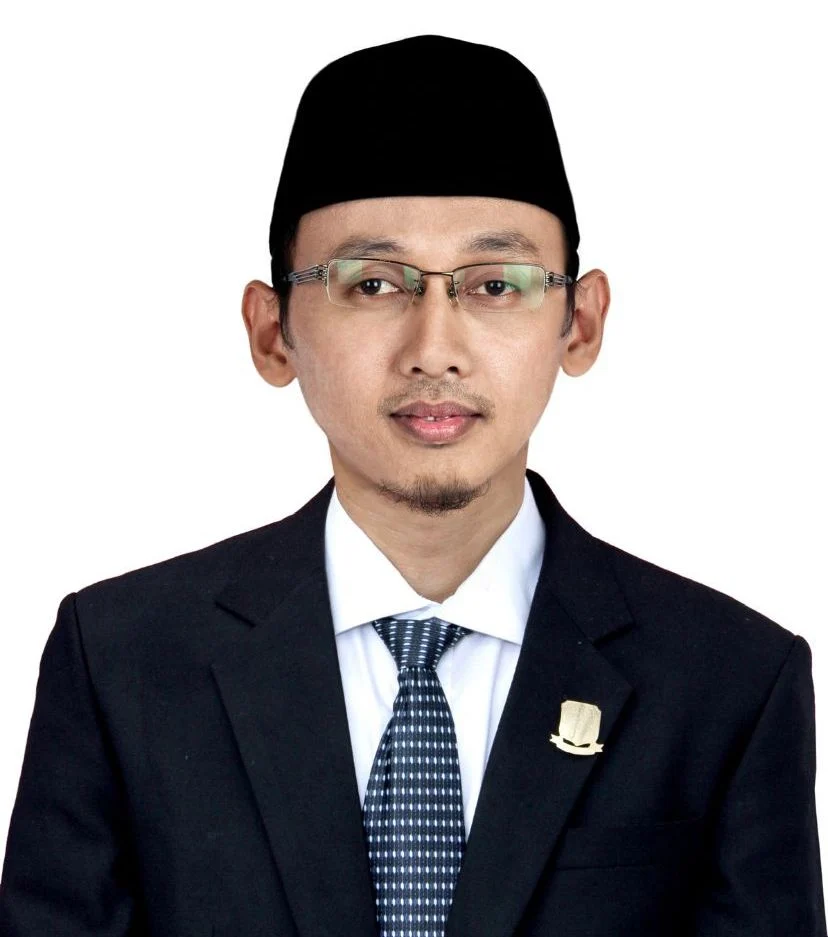

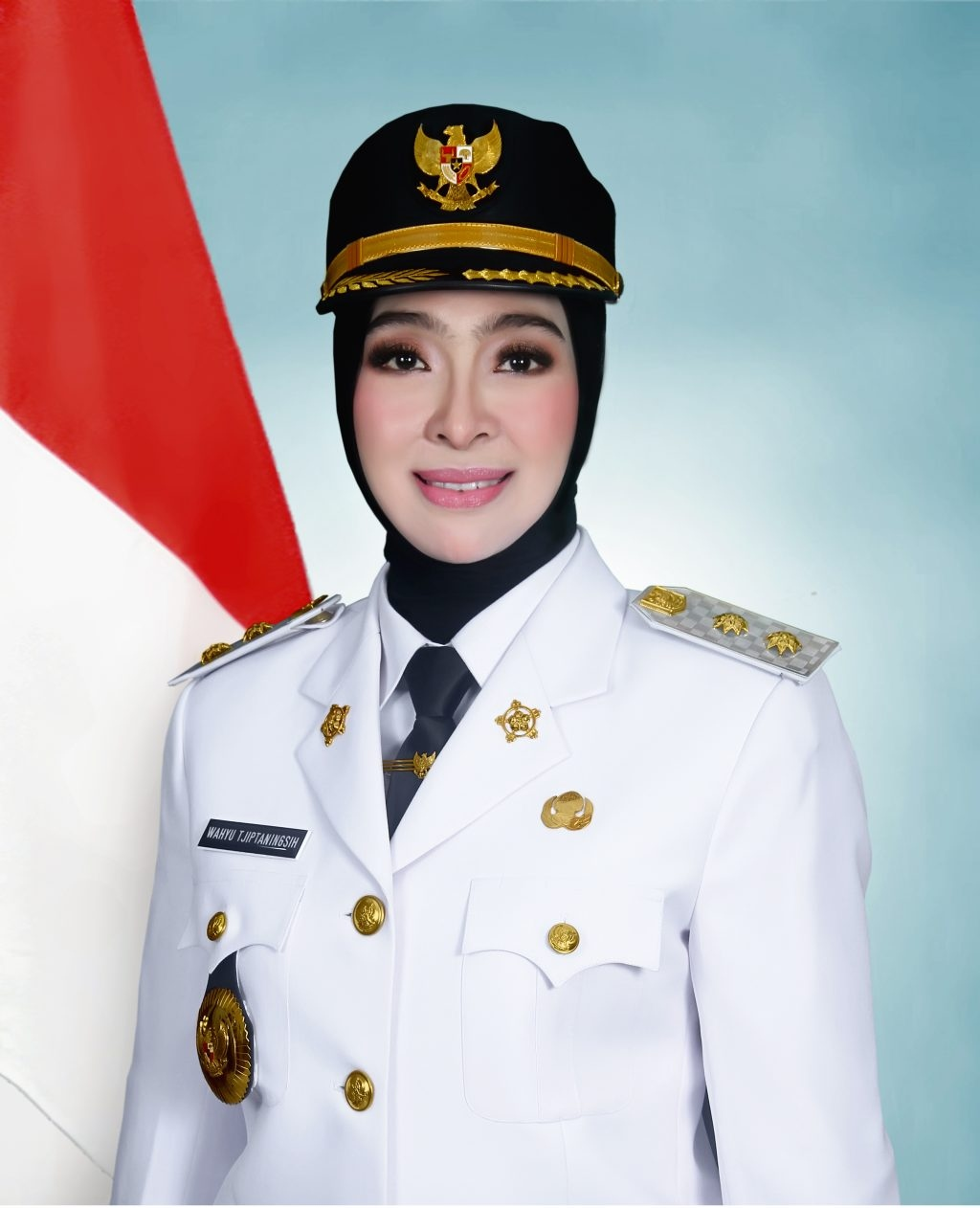

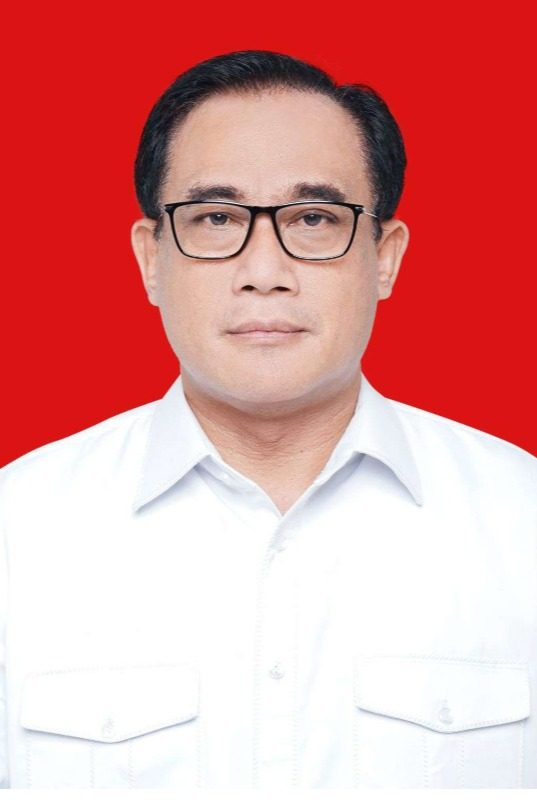
Candidate	Imron Rosyadi	Mohammad Luthfi
Party	PDI-P	PKB
Running mate	Agus Kurniawan Budiman	Dia Ramayana
Popular vote	426,323	297,531
Percentage	43.63%	30.45%
Candidate	Wahyu Tjiptaningsih	Rahmat Hidayat
Party	Gerindra	Perindo
Running mate	Solichin	Imam Saputra
Popular vote	183,467	69,771
Percentage	18.78%	7.14%
- Results map by district and subdistrict (Interactive version)
Regent before election
Wahyu Mijaya (acting)
Bureaucracy
Elected Regent
Imron Rosyadi
PDI-P

The 2024 Cirebon regency election was held on 27 November 2024 as part of nationwide local elections to elect the regent of Cirebon Regency for a five-year term. The previous election was held in 2018.

== Electoral system ==
The election, like other local elections in 2024, follow the first-past-the-post system where the candidate with the most votes wins the election, even if they do not win a majority. It is possible for a candidate to run uncontested, in which case the candidate is still required to win a majority of votes "against" an "empty box" option. Should the candidate fail to do so, the election will be repeated on a later date.

== Candidates ==
According to electoral regulations, in order to qualify for the election, candidates are required to secure support from a political party or a coalition of parties controlling 11 seats in the Cirebon Regency Regional House of Representatives (DPRD). With 13 seats, the Indonesian Democratic Party of Struggle is the only party which would be eligible to nominate a candidate without forming a coalition with other parties.

However, on 20 August 2024 the Constitutional Court of Indonesia issued ruling No. 60/PUU-XXII/2024 and MK decision No. 70/PUU-XXII/2024 which granted part of the lawsuit filed by the Labor Party and the Gelora Party against the local election law. This decision was stated in PKPU Number 8 of 2024. This ruling lowers the requirement to 6,5% for political parties to announce their own candidate pairings or total 6.5% of total combain parties. Based on this new ruling, PDI-P, National Awakening Party, Gerindra Party, Golkar, Prosperous Justice Party and the NasDem Party can name their own pairs of candidates without the need to form coalitions.

=== Declared ===
These are candidates who have been allegedly delegated by political parties endorsing for regentional election:

1
Candidate from non-parlement parties
Rahmat Hidayat	Imam Saputra
for Regent	for Vice Regent
Retired Police; Member Candidate of DPR-RI (Perindo) District of West Java 8 (2024)	Retired Police; Chairman of the Advisory Board PSGJ Cirebon
Parties
83,154 / 1,279,290 (7%) PAN (2.13%); Labour Party (0.72%); Perindo Party (0.99%); PPP (1.27%); Gelora Party (1.52%); PBB (0.12%); Ummah Party (0.35%); PKN (0.09%)

2
Candidate from PDIP and NasDem
Imron Rosyadi	Agus Kurniawan Budiman
for Regent	for Vice Regent
Regent of Cirebon (2018–2024)	Headman of Kedongdong Kidul Village (2017–present)
Parties
408,340 / 1,279,290 (32%) PDIP (22.57%); NasDem Party (9.35%)

3
Candidate from Gerindra, Democrat and PKS
Wahyu Tjiptaningsih	Solichin
for Regent	for Vice Regent
Vice Regent of Cirebon (2021–2024)	Deputy Chairman of PCNU Cirebon Regency
Parties
368,756 / 1,279,290 (29%) Gerindra (12.96%); PKS (9.78%); Demokrat (6.08%)

4
Candidate from PKB and Golkar
Mohammad Luthfi	Dia Ramayana
for Regent	for Vice Regent
Speaker of the Cirebon Regency Regional People's Representative Council (2019–2024)	Expert Staff of Golkar Faction of the Indonesian House of Representatives
Parties
377,494 / 1,279,290 (30%) PKB (18.68%); Golkar (10.83%)

=== Potential ===
The following are individuals who have either been publicly mentioned as a potential candidate by a political party in the DPRD, publicly declared their candidacy with press coverage, or considered as a potential candidate by media outlets:

- Imron Rosyadi (PDIP), incumbent regent.
- Wahyu Tjiptaningsih (PDIP), incumbent vice regent.
- Mohammad Luthfi (PKB), incumbent speaker of Cirebon Regency Regional People's Representative Council
- Teguh Rusiana Merdeka (Golkar), incumbent deputy speaker of Cirebon Regency Regional People's Representative Council
- Ismiyatul Fatihiyah Yusuf (PKB), Member of Cirebon Regency Regional People's Representative Council
- Junaedi (PKS), leader of Prosperous Justice Party (PKS) Cirebon regency local representative
- R. Hasan Basori (PKB), Member of Cirebon Regency Regional People's Representative Council
- Anwar Yasin (PKS), Member of West Java Regional People's Representative Council
- M. Nuruzzaman, Special Staff of the Minister of Religion
- Suharso, Community Figure, Bureaucrat
- Muali, Chief of Forum Komunikasi Kuwu Cirebon (FKKC)
- Muhammad Abdullah Syukri (Gus Abe), President of PB PMII

== Political map ==
Following the 2024 Indonesian legislative election, seven political parties are represented in the Cirebon regency DPRD:

Ranking	Serial	Political parties	Vote		Seat(s) count	Change
1	3	Indonesian Democratic Party of Struggle (PDI-P)	288.686	22,57%	13 / 50	▲5
2	1	National Awakening Party (PKB)	238.952	18,68%	9 / 50	▼1
3	2	Great Indonesia Movement Party (Gerindra)	165.872	12,96%	7 / 50	Steady
4	4	Party of Functional Groups (Golkar)	138.542	10,83%	7 / 50	Steady
5	8	Prosperous Justice Party (PKS)	125.112	9,78%	6 / 50	▲1
6	5	NasDem Party	119.654	9,35%	4 / 50	▼3
7	14	Democratic Party (Demokrat)	77.772	6,08%	4 / 50	▼1
8	12	National Mandate Party (PAN)	27.300	2,13%	0 / 50	Steady

== Polling ==
Type of polling	Date	Sample size	Imron-Agus	Wahyu-Solichin	Luthfi-Dia	Rahmat-Imam
Popularity	August, 30 and September 6, 2024	300	35,85%	24.30%	19.12%	7.56%
Electability	August, 30 and September 6, 2024	300	20,83%	4.16%	12.50%	2.78%

Pollster	Date	Sample size	Error margin	Rahmat-Imam	Imron-Agus	Wahyu-Solichin	Luthfi-Dia
Charta Politica	November 5 until November 10, 2024	600	± 2.9%	8.3%	41.5%	12.0%	26.2%

== Results ==
Candidate	Running mate	Supporting coalition	Votes	%
Rahmat Hidayat	Imam Saputra	Non-Parliament Parties	69,771	7.14
Imron Rosyadi	Agus Kurniawan Budiman	PDI-P and NasDem	426,323	43.63
Wahyu Tjiptaningsih	Solichin	Gerindra, PKS and Democrat	183,467	18.78
Mohammad Luthfi	Dia Ramayana	PKB and Golkar	297,531	30.45
Total			977,092	100.00
Valid votes			977,092	94.09
Invalid votes			61,342	5.91
Total votes			1,038,434	100.00
Registered voters/turnout			1,744,235	59.54
Source: General Elections Commission of Cirebon Regency
