= Kue semprong =

Indonesian traditional cookies

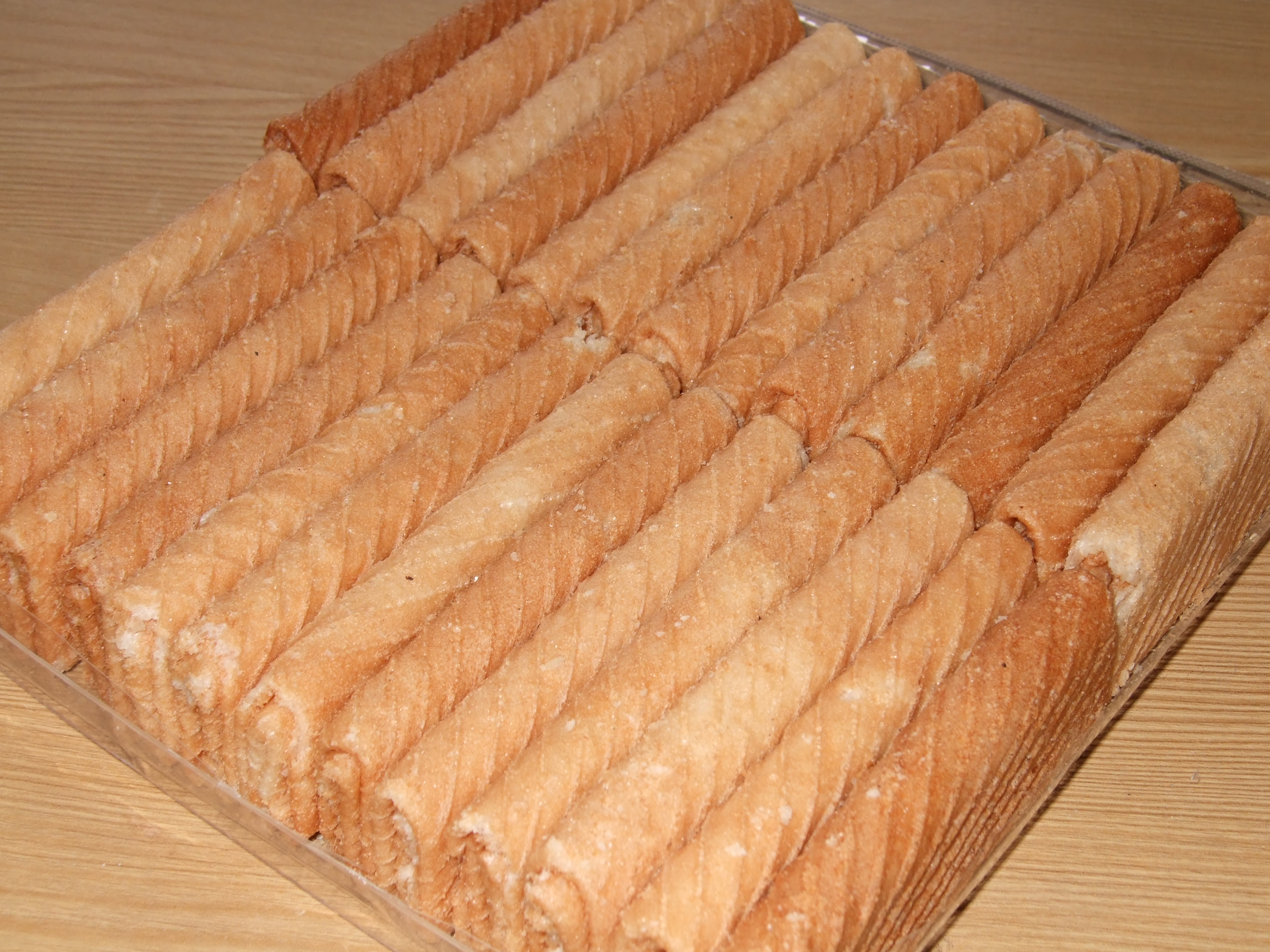
- A box of kue semprong
- Alternative names: Sapit, sepit, kapit, gulong, love letter, kue Belanda
- Type: Wafer, kue
- Course: Snack
- Place of origin: Indonesia
- Region or state: Throughout Indonesia, Malaysia, Brunei, Singapore
- Main ingredients: Rice flour, granulated sugar, coconut milk, eggs, cooking oil

Kue semprong, the Asian egg roll, the love letter, sapit, sepit, kue Belanda, or kapit is an Indonesian Chinese traditional wafer snack (kue or kuih) made by clasping egg batter using an iron mold (Waffle iron) which is heated up on a charcoal stove. It is commonly found in Indonesia, Malaysia, Singapore and Brunei.

The mold has two plates clasped tightly together and attached to long handles for manipulating over a charcoal stove. The molds may be flat, corrugated, or etched with animal motifs such as fish, roosters, and snails that are both auspicious and decorative.

== Shapes and variants ==
In Indonesian, the term semprong means "tube" or "roll", while sepit derives from jepit, which means "clip". Semprong and sepit are almost identical wafers, with the difference only in their shape; the roll-shaped is called semprong, while the triangular-folded is called sepit. Both variants are called sapit or sepit in Malaysia and Brunei, regardless of their shape. Traditional kue semprong are hollow; newer variants, however, may contain fillings such as chocolate or cheese.

== History and origin ==
Commonly found in most major cities in Indonesia, kue semprong demonstrates the colonial link between Indonesia and the Netherlands. It is believed to derive from the Dutch egg roll wafer. The word Belanda, meaning Dutch in Bahasa Indonesia, points to the egg rolls’ Dutch origins. The Dutch have a vast biscuit repertoire, which includes thin wafer biscuits similar to kuih Belanda or kuih kapit. Many biscuit and cake techniques were passed to Malays by the Dutch, English, and Portuguese. These biscuits may have been brought to parts of Malaysia and Singapore from Penang and Malacca by the Peranakan Chinese, who, not knowing the name of the Dutch snack they had encountered, simply called it kuih Belanda or kuih kapit.

== See also ==
- Kue gapit
- Egg roll
- Crepes
- Peranakan cuisine
- Biscuit roll
- Fortune cookie
- Barquillo
