= Sumber, Cirebon =

District in West Java, Indonesia

Sumber
- District

Regional transcription(s)
  - Sundanese: ᮞᮥᮙ᮪ᮘᮨᮁ
  - Javanese: ꦯꦸꦩ꧀ꦧꦺꦂ
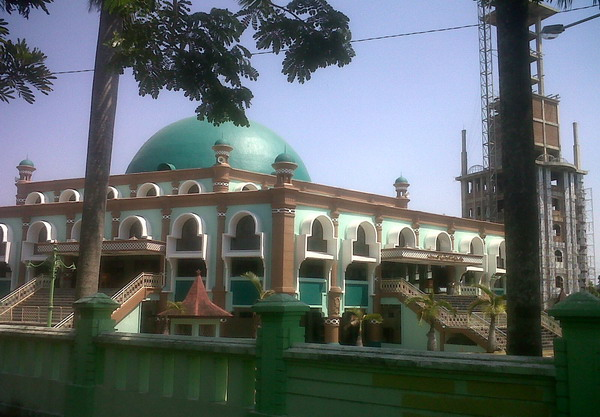
- Grand Mosque of Sumber

- Location in Java and Indonesia Sumber (Indonesia)
- Coordinates: 6°45′16″S 108°29′9″E
- Country: Indonesiaīīū
- Province: West Java
- Regency: Cirebon Regency

Government
  - Camat: Iman Santoso
  - Secretary: Carmin

Area
  - Total: 25.65 km^{2} (9.90 sq mi)
- Elevation: 66 m (217 ft)

Population (mid 2023 estimate)
  - Total: 102,973
  - Density: 4,015/km^{2} (10,400/sq mi)
- Time zone: UTC+7 (IWT)
- Postal code: 4561x
- Area code: (+62) 231
- Villages: 14
- Website: Official website

Sumber (Sundanese: ᮞᮥᮙ᮪ᮘᮨᮁ; Javanese: ꦯꦸꦩ꧀ꦧꦺꦂ) is a district which serves as the regency seat of the Cirebon Regency of West Java, Indonesia. It is divided into 14 villages which are listed as follows:

- Babakan (4,368)
- Sumber (10,496)
- Perbutulan (4,786)
- Kaliwadas (9,646)
- Pasalakan (9,333)
- Watubelah (8,134)
- Pejambon (5,111)
- Gegunung (5,671)
- Kemantren (5,160)
- Sendang (4,775)
- Tukmudal (13,876)
- Kenanga (8,652)
- Matangaji (4,988)
- Sidawangi (6,659)

The first 12 of these 14 are classed as urban kelurahan (Babakan occupying 1.38 km^{2}, Sumber 2.50 km^{2}, Perbutulan 0.53 km^{2}, Kaliwadas 1.76 km^{2}, Pasalakan 1.62 km^{2}, Watubelah 1.93 km^{2}, Pejambon 1.44 km^{2}, Gegunung 1.72 km^{2}, Kemantren 0.75 km^{2}, Sendang 0.74 km^{2}, Tukmudal 2.30 km^{2} and Kenanga 1.86 km^{2}), while the remaining 2 are classed as rural desa and are situated in the south of the district (Matangaji with an area of 2.48 km^{2} and Sidawangi 4.64 km^{2}).

== Climate ==
Sumber has a tropical monsoon climate (Am) with moderate to little rainfall from June to October and heavy to very heavy rainfall from November to May.

Climate data for Sumber
Month	Jan	Feb	Mar	Apr	May	Jun	Jul	Aug	Sep	Oct	Nov	Dec	Year
Mean daily maximum °C (°F)	30.9 (87.6)	30.7 (87.3)	31.2 (88.2)	31.7 (89.1)	32.0 (89.6)	32.0 (89.6)	32.1 (89.8)	32.6 (90.7)	33.3 (91.9)	33.6 (92.5)	32.5 (90.5)	31.6 (88.9)	32.0 (89.6)
Daily mean °C (°F)	26.6 (79.9)	26.4 (79.5)	26.7 (80.1)	27.1 (80.8)	27.3 (81.1)	27.0 (80.6)	27.0 (80.6)	27.1 (80.8)	27.5 (81.5)	27.9 (82.2)	27.4 (81.3)	26.9 (80.4)	27.1 (80.7)
Mean daily minimum °C (°F)	22.3 (72.1)	22.2 (72.0)	22.3 (72.1)	22.5 (72.5)	22.6 (72.7)	22.0 (71.6)	21.9 (71.4)	21.6 (70.9)	21.7 (71.1)	22.2 (72.0)	22.4 (72.3)	23.3 (73.9)	22.3 (72.1)
Average rainfall mm (inches)	499 (19.6)	416 (16.4)	412 (16.2)	218 (8.6)	157 (6.2)	80 (3.1)	61 (2.4)	44 (1.7)	29 (1.1)	73 (2.9)	226 (8.9)	360 (14.2)	2,575 (101.3)
Source: Climate-Data.org
