= Imron Rosyadi =

Indonesian politician and bureaucrat (born 1961)

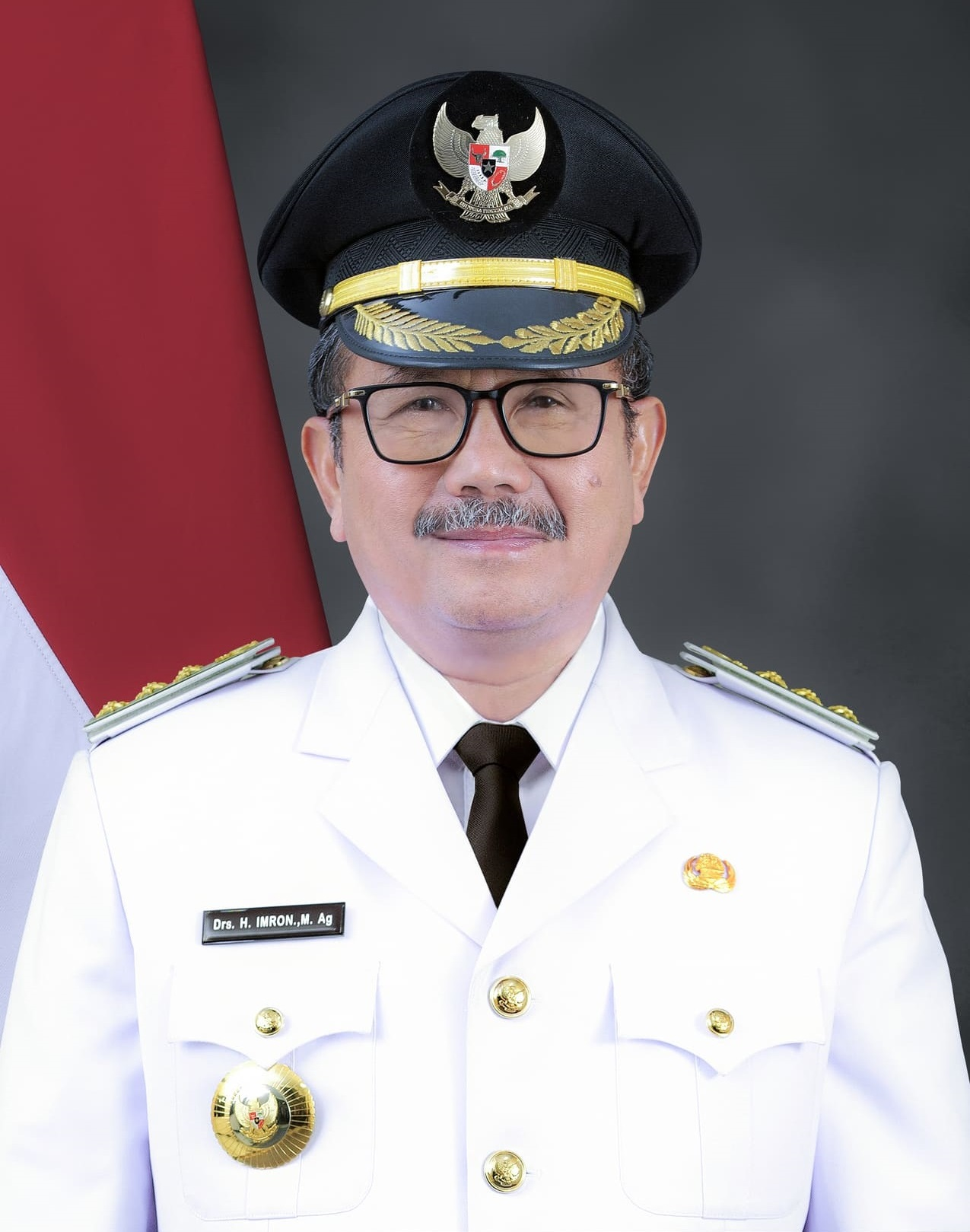

28th Regent of Cirebon
- Incumbent
- Assumed office 20 February 2025
- Vice Regent: Agus Kurniawan Budiman
- Preceded by: Wahyu Mijaya (acting)
- In office 1 October 2019 – 31 December 2023; Acting since 17 May 2019
- Vice Regent: Wahyu Tjiptaningsih (since 2021)
- Preceded by: Sunjaya Purwadisastra
- Succeeded by: Wahyu Mijaya (acting)

6th Vice Regent of Cirebon
- In office 17 May 2019 – 17 May 2019
- Regent: Sunjaya Purwadisastra
- Preceded by: Selly Andriany Gantina
- Succeeded by: Wahyu Tjiptaningsih

Personal details
- Born: 17 December 1961 (age 64) Tengahtani, Cirebon, Indonesia
- Party: PDI-P

Imron Rosyadi (born 17 December 1961) is an Indonesian politician and former bureaucrat who served as the regent of Cirebon between 2019 and 2023 in his first term and between 2025 and 2030 in his second term.

== Early life and education ==
Imron Rosyadi was born in Cirebon Regency on 17 December 1961. He studied in Cirebon, including nine years at Islamic schools. He then studied at the State Islamic Institute Bandung, and after receiving his degree began to work as a civil servant. He would later receive master's degrees in management and theology.

== Career ==
His career as a civil servant began at a Ministry of Religious Affairs office in Bandung Regency. He eventually became head of the office, before heading the West Bandung Regency office when the regency split from Bandung. In 2016, he was assigned to Cirebon Regency's religious affairs office.

In the 2018 Cirebon regency election, Rosyadi ran as the running mate of incumbent regent Sunjaya Purwadisastra with the support of PDI-P, and the pair won the four-way race with 319,630 votes (31.9%). However, Purwadisastra would be arrested for bribery which occurred during his first term, and so Rosyadi was made acting regent immediately after being sworn in as vice regent on 18 May 2019 as Purwadisastra was removed from his post around five minutes after he was sworn in for his second term. Rosyadi would be sworn in as a full regent on 1 October 2019.

As regent, Rosyadi has launched programs to add new classrooms to schools in the regency and renovate existing ones. His first term ended on 17 May 2024, and he has declared that he will run in the 2024 Cirebon regency election for a second term. Rosyadi and his running mate, Agus Kurniawan Budiman, won the election with 43.63% of the vote. They were inaugurated by President Prabowo Subianto on February 20, 2025, and Rosyadi officially began his second term as Regent of Cirebon.

== Family ==
He is married to Nunung Roosmini, and the couple has four children.
