= Cirebon Regency =

Regency in West Java, Indonesia

Cirebon Regency Kabupaten Cirebon
- Regency

Other transcription(s)
  - Javanese: ꦏꦧꦸꦥꦠꦺꦤ꧀ꦕꦶꦉꦧꦺꦴꦤ꧀
  - Sundanese: ᮊᮘᮥᮕᮒᮦᮔ᮪ ᮎᮤᮛᮨᮘᮧᮔ᮪
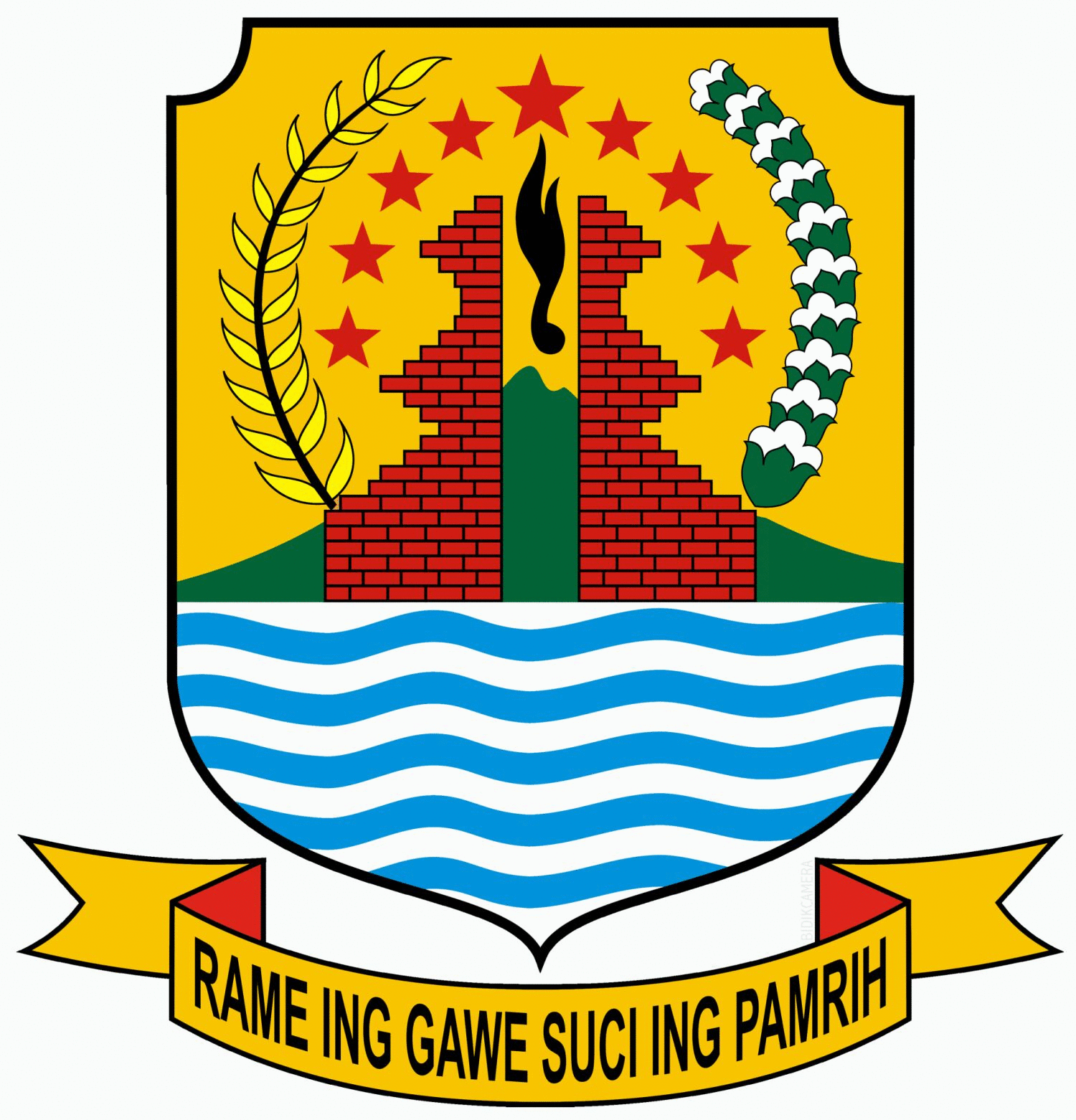
- Coat of arms
- Motto: Rame Ing Gawe Suci Ing Pamrih (High in Efforts, Chaste in Rewards)
- Location within West Java

- Location in Java and Indonesia Cirebon Regency (Indonesia)
- Coordinates: 6°45′51″S 108°28′44″E
- Country: Indonesia
- Province: West Java

Government
  - Regent: Imron Rosyadi
  - Vice Regent: Agus Kurniawan Budiman

Area
  - Total: 1,075.16 km^{2} (415.12 sq mi)

Population (mid 2025 estimate)
  - Total: 2,413,814
  - Density: 2,245.07/km^{2} (5,814.72/sq mi)
- Time zone: UTC+7 (Indonesia Western Time)
- Area code: +62 231
- License plate: E
- Website: cirebonkab.go.id

Cirebon Regency is a regency (kabupaten) of West Java Province of Indonesia. The town of Sumber is its regency seat. It covers 1,075.16 km^{2} and had a population of 2,068,116 at the 2010 census and 2,270,621 at the 2020 census; the official estimate as at mid 2025 was 2,413,814 (comprising 1,221,080 males and 1,192,734 females). These area and population figures exclude those of Cirebon City, which is a separate administration, although totally surrounded by the regency on its landward side.

The Cirebon region is renowned for the production of various types of mangoes. There are plans to support the expansion of mango production in the region both for export as well as for the domestic market. Mango production is currently concentrated in just a few parts of the regency. Local farmers and officials believe there is considerable potential to expand production to other nearby parts of the locality.

== Etymology ==
Being on the border of Sundanese (i.e., West Java) and Javanese (i.e., Central Java) cultural regions, many of Cirebon's residents speak a dialect that is a mix of Sundanese and Javanese, known as the Jawareh dialect, and it is thought that the word "Cirebon" derives from the Javanese word, caruban, meaning "mixed", a reference to the city's mix of Sundanese, Javanese, Chinese, and Arabic cultural elements. Alternatively, it could be derived from the Sundanese words of "Ci" (water or river) and "Rebon" ("shrimp"). (Indeed, the main production of the city is fishery including shrimps).

== History ==
According to the manuscript Purwaka Caruban Nagari, in 15th century Cirebon started as a small fishing village named Muara Jati. At that time the port of Muara Jati already attracted foreign traders. The port master at that time is Ki Gedeng Alang-Alang whose appointed by the king of Galuh kingdom located inland in Kawali, Ciamis. He moved the port to Lemahwungkuk, 5 kilometres southward. As the new settlement leader, Ki Gedeng Alang-Alang was bestowed the title "Kuwu Cerbon" (Cerbon village leader).

A 15th century prince from Pajajaran, Prince Walangsungsang, converted to Islam, and was appointed as the Adipati (Duke) of Cirebon with the title Cakrabumi. He established the new kingdom of Cirebon and declared independence from Sunda and Galuh. The establishment of Cirebon Sultanate marked the first Islamic rule in Western Java, that grew from modest fishing village of Muara Jati to a busy port of Java northern coast. Cirebon grew as one of the independent sultanates under the leadership of Sunan Gunungjati, in the early 16th century.

After the Sunda Kingdom collapsed, The Sultanates of Banten and Mataram fought control over Cirebon, which declared its allegiance to Sultan Agung of Mataram. But the latter's grandson Amangkurat II ceded the city to the Dutch in 1677. A treaty in 1705 saw the Cirebon area west of Cisanggarung River became a Dutch protectorate jointly administered by three sultans whose courts rivalled those of Central Java. The Dutch authorities later established the Cirebon Residence (Residentie Tjirebon) which composed of present-day Cirebon, Indramayu, and Kuningan.

During the time of the Dutch "Culture System" a flourishing trade in colonial cash crops attracted many Chinese entrepreneurs and the Chinese influence is still evident in the batik for which Cirebon is famous. Cirebon suffered a famine in 1844, apparently triggered by a combination of drought and the shift from subsistence agriculture to cash crops, particularly indigo and sugarcane.

=== Campaign for Cirebon Province ===
Some of the local political elite in Cirebon and surrounding regencies have campaigned for Cirebon city, together with the regencies of Cirebon, Indramayu, Kuningan and Majalengka to be established as a new province (Provinsi Rebana) - in the same way as Banten Province was formed in 2000 by splitting it away from West Java. To be a new province it is required that it should be proposed by at least three regencies. Leaders from four of these administrations have given their consent, but Majalengka Regency has turned down the idea and indicated that it would prefer to stay part of West Java. However, the lack of support from the Majalengka area does not preclude Cirebon city and the other three regencies from continuing to promote the idea.

The potential size and population of this possible Province would be as follows:

Name	Capital	Area in km^{2}	Pop'n 2010 census	Pop'n 2020 census	Pop'n mid 2025 estimate
Cirebon City	Cirebon	39.48	296,389	333,303	347,587
Cirebon Regency	Sumber	1,075.16	2,067,196	2,270,621	2,413,814
Indramayu Regency	Indramayu	2,078.03	1,663,737	1,834,434	1,950,316
Kuningan Regency	Kuningan	1,194.09	1,035,589	1,167,686	1,225,493
Majalengka Regency	Majalengka	1,204.24	1,166,473	1,305,476	1,374,601
Totals		5,591.00	6,229,384	6,911,520	7,311,811

== Geography ==
Cirebon Regency is bordered by the Java Sea to the north-east, Indramayu Regency to the north, Majalengka Regency to the west, Kuningan Regency to the south, and Brebes Regency (in Central Java Province) to the southeast. A small landing site "Penggung" also serves the TNI-AU. The city lies on Jalur Pantura (Pantai Utara Jawa), a major road on the northern coast of Java that stretches from Anyer, passes through Jakarta, and ends at Surabaya.

=== Administrative divisions ===
Cirebon Regency (excluding Cirebon City) is divided into forty districts (kecamatan), listed below with their areas and their populations at the 2010 census and the 2020 census, together with the official estimates as at mid 2025. The table also includes the locations of the district administrative centres, the number of administrative villages in each district (totaling 412 rural desa and 12 urban kelurahan, the latter all being in Sumber District), and their post codes.

Kode Wilayah	Name of District (kecamatan)	Area in km^{2}	Pop'n 2010 census	Pop'n 2020 census	Pop'n mid 2025 estimate	Admin centre	No. of villages	Post code
32.09.01	Waled	29.64	52,659	56,013	58,560	Waled Kota	12	45180
32.09.32	Pasaleman	39.53	24,968	26,528	27,719	Pasaleman	7	45187
32.09.02	Ciledug	13.79	42,174	45,601	48,054	Ciledug Kulon	10	45188
32.09.33	Pabuaran	9.66	33,696	36,760	38,905	Pabuaran Lor	7	45194
32.09.03	Losari	48.00	54,101	62,351	67,765	Panggangsari	10	45192
32.09.04	Pabedilan	25.96	51,475	58,198	62,667	Pabedilan Kidul	13	45193
32.09.05	Babakan	22.18	62,312	71,288	77,203	Babakan Gebang	14	45191
32.09.30	Gebang	35.77	57,605	67,861	74,540	Gebang	13	45190
32.09.06	Karangsembung	17.12	34,450	36,491	38,073	Karangsuwung	8	45186
32.09.34	Karangwareng	27.21	26,563	28,547	29,994	Kubangdeleg	9	45184
32.09.07	Lemahabang	22.60	50,751	55,569	58,915	Lemahabang	13	45183
32.09.08	Susukan Lebak	20.02	37,010	41,147	43,948	Susukan Agung	13	45185
32.09.09	Sedong	34.63	39,429	42,302	44,410	Panongan	10	45189
32.09.10	Astanajapura	27.15	75,737	79,884	83,176	Buntet	11	45181
32.09.11	Pangenan	37.66	43,001	46,870	49,583	Pangenan	9	45182
32.09.12	Mundu	29.15	73,591	81,221	86,444	Luwung	12	45173
32.09.13	Beber	25.46	36,521	44,203	49,193	Halimpu	10	45172
32.09.38	Greged	31.80	51,073	56,812	60,695	Nanggela	10	45170
	Total South & East	497.33	847,116	937,646	999,844		191	
32.09.14	Talun	21.29	62,819	71,464	77,182	Kecomberan	11	45171
32.09.15	Sumber	27.08	80,959	96,725	106,970	Sumber	14 ^{(a)}	45611: 45613
32.09.16	Dukupuntang	39.05	60,356	64,980	68,333	Dukupuntang	13	45652
32.09.17	Palimanan	18.61	55,609	61,933	66,205	Palimanan Timur	12	45160
32.09.18	Plumbon	19.25	73,416	82,323	88,292	Plumbon	15	45158
32.09.31	Depok	16.18	57,071	66,246	72,248	Depok	12	45155
32.09.19	Weru	9.87	64,213	69,942	73,966	Setu Kulon	9	45159
32.09.36	Plered	12.31	51,092	55,102	57,994	Kaliwulu	10	45154
32.09.35	Tengahtani	9.85	40,381	45,435	48,810	Dawuan	8	45168
32.09.20	Kedawung	10.71	62,245	60,933	61,829	Kalikoa	8	45153
32.09.21	Gunungjati	19.56	77,918	82,442	85,970	Klayan	13	45151
32.09.22	Kapetakan	67.00	51,601	60,975	67,076	Kapetakan	9	45152
32.09.39	Suranenggala	29.41	41,386	46,081	49,294	Karangreja	11	45150
32.09.23	Klangenan	20.59	51,028	52,948	54,695	Jemaras Kidul	9	45157
32.09.40	Jamblang	16.72	35,240	38,236	40,360	Wangunharja	8	45156
32.09.24	Arjawinangun	24.51	62,813	70,730	76,013	Arjawinangun	11	45162
32.09.25	Panguragan	22.31	42,637	43,208	44,126	Panguragan Kulon	9	45163
32.09.26	Ciwaringin	19.05	38,107	38,381	39,080	Ciwaringin	8	45167
32.09.37	Gempol	30.61	43,266	46,230	48,438	Gempol	8	45161
32.09.27	Susukan	51.42	62,329	68,394	72,589	Bojong Kulon	12	45166
32.09.28	Gegesik	63.47	69,598	69,355	70,374	Gegesik Lor	14	45164
32.09.29	Kaliwedi	28.987	35,996	40,912	44,166	Kaliwedi Kidul	9	45165
	Total North & West	577.83	1,240,069	1,332,985	1,413,970		233	

Note: (a) comprises the 12 kelurahan (Babakan, Gegunung, Kaliwadas, Kemantren, Kenanga, Pasalakan, Pejambon, Perbutulan, Sendang, Sumber, Tukmudal and Watubelah) and 2 desa.

The city of Cirebon virtually splits the Regency geographically into two parts, and proposals have been made to split the 18 south-eastern districts off as a separate regency. These eighteen districts in the first half of the table lie to the south and east of the city, and constitute the 'candidate' or planned separate regency (calon daerah baru) of East Cirebon (Kabupaten Cirebon Timur). The twenty-two districts in the second half of the table are situated to the north and west of the city, and constitute the 'core territory' or intended residual part of the regency (daerah induk).

== Demographics ==
The city's population was 298,224 at the census of 2010 and 333,303 at the census of 2020. The official estimate as at mid 2024 was 344,851. As with other coastal cities in Indonesia, a large population of ethnic Chinese has flocked into the city as a result of long-term Chinese immigration since the 17th century. Significant suburbs lie within densely populated Cirebon Regency, and the official metropolitan area encompasses this entire regency as well as the city. As many people in Indonesia still go by one name as in Indonesian tradition, the country is facing a major overhaul of its identification cards (E-KTP), new data is challenging 2010 population census figures, however the accuracy vis-a-vis the census remains unknown.

Administrative division	Area (km^{2})	Pop'n 2010 census	Pop'n 2020 census	Pop'n mid 2024 estimate	Pop'n density mid 2024 (per km^{2})
Cirebon City	39.48	298,224	333,303	344,851	8,735
Cirebon Regency	1,076.76	2,068,116	2,270,621	2,387,961	2,218
Metropolitan area	1,116.24	2,366,340	2,603,924	2,732,812	2,448

sources: (Budan Pusat Statistik 2010 and 2020 censuses of Indonesia)

- https://web.archive.org/web/20120628013636/http://www.bps.go.id/aboutus.php?sp=0&kota=32 Tabel Hasil Sensus Penduduk 2010 Provinsi JAWA BARAT
- https://web.archive.org/web/20131014170450/http://www.jabarprov.go.id/index.php/subMenu/75 Sumber : Database SIAK Provinsi Jawa Barat Tahun 2011

Although surrounded by Sundanese-speaking areas in West Java, linguists have stated that Cirebon (and the historically related region of Serang city in Banten Province) is inside its own Cirebonese language area. In addition, this is supported by a large portion of the Cirebon people referring to themselves as "Wong Cirebon" ("Cirebonese people"), and to their language as "Basa Cirebon" ("Cirebonese"). Cirebonese language is related to Javanese and Banyumasan with dialects such as the Jawareh, Plered, and Dermayon dialects. A portion of people in eastern Cirebon identified themselves as either Javanese or Banyumasan, while people lived in the border region with the Kuningan and Majalengka Regencies identified themselves as Sundanese.

== Economy ==
Cirebon City economy is influenced by the strategic geographical location and characteristics of natural resources so that the structure of its economy dominated by manufacturing, trade, hotels and restaurants, transport and communications and service sectors. Tomé Pires in the Suma Oriental around the year 1513 mentions Cirebon is one of the trade center on the island of Java. After Cirebon taken over by the Dutch East Indies government, in 1859, designated as a transit port of Cirebon import-export goods and the political control center for the region in the interior of Java.

Until 2001, the economic contribution to the City of Cirebon is a processing industry (41.32%), followed by trade, hotels and restaurants (29.8%), transport and communications sector (13.56%), services sector (6.06%). While other sectors (9.26%) including mining, agriculture, construction, electricity, gas and an average of 2-3%.

Aside from fishery, its harbour, Tanjung Emas, on the Java Sea has been a major hub for timber from Borneo.

== Culture ==
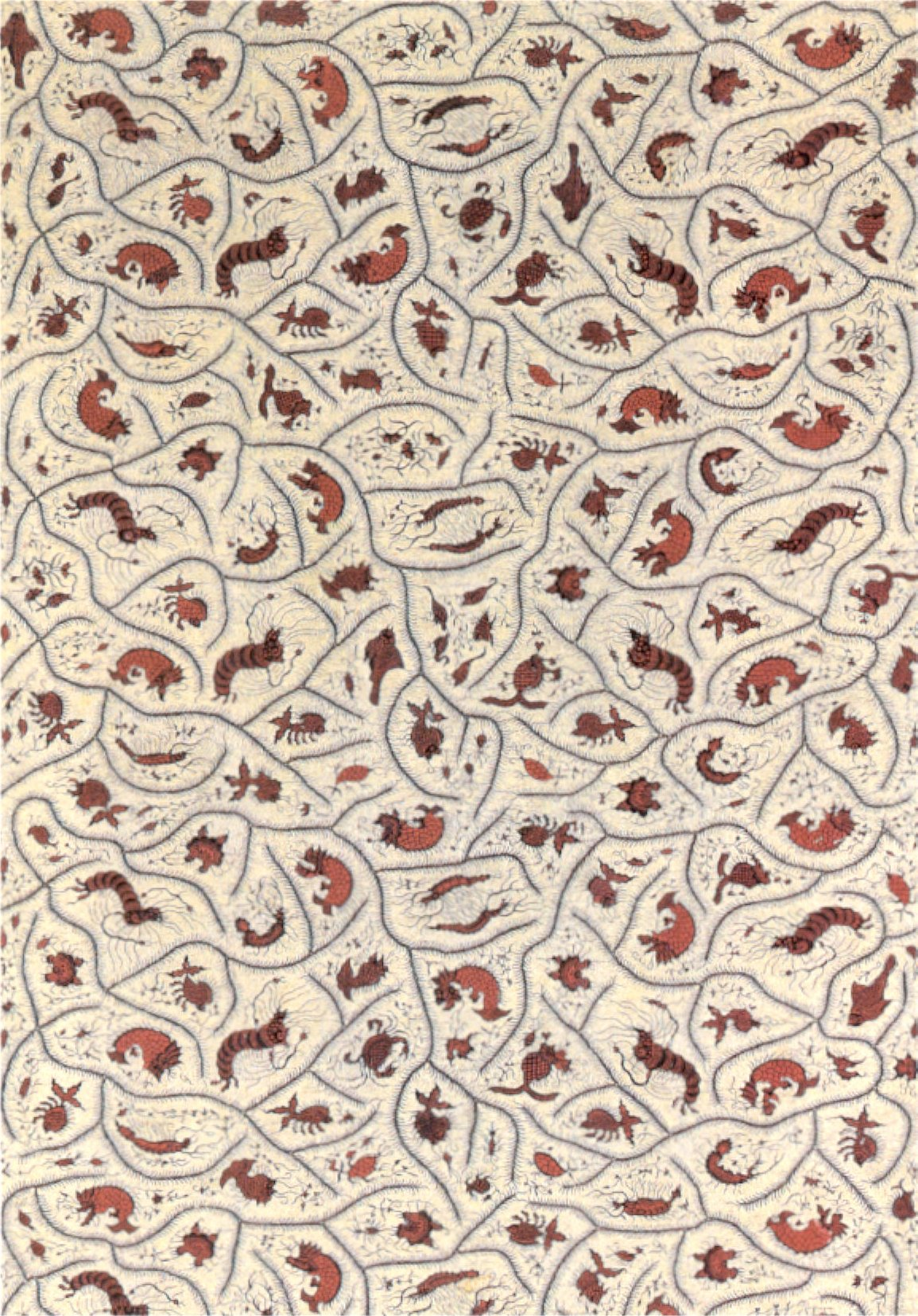
Detail of skirt from Cirebon, early 20th century, cotton, tulis batik, at the Honolulu Academy of Arts

Cirebon itself is known as Grage in its native Cirebonese language, which came from the words "Negara Gede", meaning "Great Kingdom." As a port city, Cirebon attract settlers from around and overseas alike. Cirebon culture was described as Java Pasisiran (coastal) culture, similar with those of Banten, Batavia, Pekalongan, and Semarang, with notable influences mixture of Chinese, Arabic-Islamic, and European influences.

=== Arts and crafts ===
Batik textiles from Cirebon are particularly renowned. The notable one is Cirebon batik with vivid colors with motifs and patterns that clearly demonstrate Chinese and local influences. Chinese influences can be seen in Cirebon's culture, most notably the Cirebon batik Megamendung pattern that resembles Chinese cloud imagery. The Trusmi area is well known as the production center of Cirebon batik. The glass painting art also has been known as Cirebon arts and craft. The imagery usually derived from wayang theme to Islamic calligraphy.

=== Performing arts ===
The Tari Topeng Cirebon, or Cirebon mask dance, is a dance style peculiar to the city. Topeng Cirebon mask dance, inspired by Javanese Panji cycles, is one of the notable Cirebon traditional dances and quite famous within Indonesian dances.

Cirebon culture also influenced by Islamic Middle Eastern culture, such as the Burokan tradition where people held the image of buraq — traditionally made from bamboo frame and paper skin, or other materials — around the village accompanied with music. The traditions on held bamboo statues is similar with Sundanese Sisingaan, Betawi Ondel-ondel, or Balinese Ogoh-ogoh, yet differ in its Islamic theme. Burokan usually held during festive occasion such as circumcision or marriage, accompanied by popular Cirebon folk songs, such as tarling.

Tarling is a musical tradition reminiscent of Bandung's kecapi suling music with except that it features guitar, suling (bamboo flute) and voice. The name derived from gitar (guitar), and suling (flute).

=== Court culture ===
The remnants of Cirebon sultanate; Kasepuhan, Kanoman, Kaprabonan, and Kacirebonan keratons are now run as cultural institution to preserve Cirebon culture. Each still held their traditional ceremonies and become the patrons of Cirebon arts. Some of royal symbols of Cirebon Sultanate describe their legacy and influences. The banner of Cirebon Sultanate is called "Macan Ali" (Ali's panther) with Arabic calligraphy arranged to resemble a panther or tiger, describe both Islamic influence and also Hindu Pajajaran Sundanese King Siliwangi tiger banner. Although did not held real political power anymore, the royal lineage of Cirebon still well respected and held in high prestige among the people of Cirebon.

The royal carriage of Kasepuhan's Singa Barong and Kanoman's Paksi Naga Liman carriage resemble the chimera of three animals; eagle, elephant, and dragon, to symbolize Indian Hinduism, Arabic Islam, and Chinese influences. The images of Macan Ali, Singa Barong and Paksi Naga Liman also often featured as pattern in Cirebon batik.

=== Cuisine ===
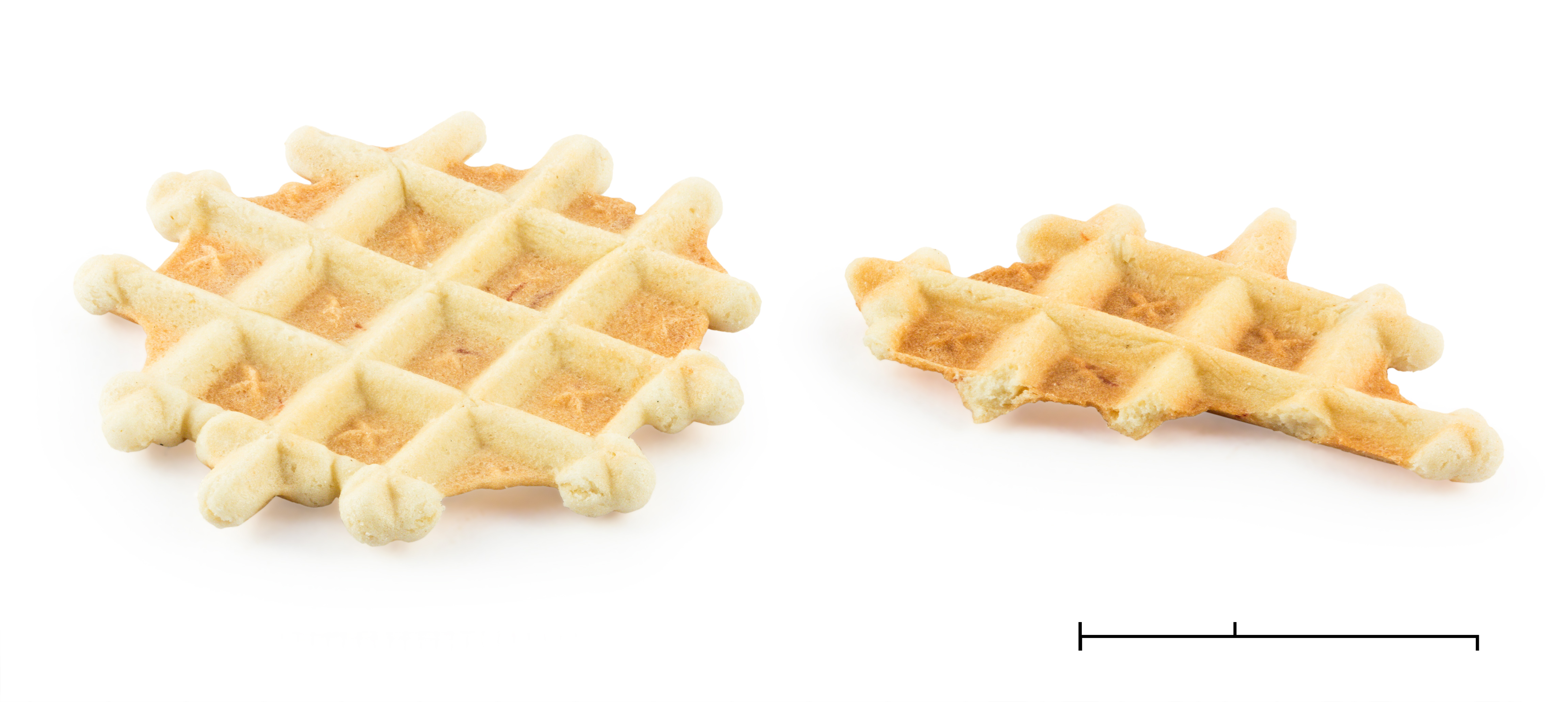
Kue gapit, one of the kue from Cirebon

As a coastal city, Cirebon's main industry is fishery. Its products include terasi (shrimp paste), petis, krupuk udang (shrimp crackers) and various salted fish. Cirebon is famous for its good quality salted fishes, such as jambal roti, juhi (salted cuttlefish), rebon and ebi (dried small shrimp). These products often being seek by visitors, especially Indonesian domestic tourist and visitors from other cities, as oleh-oleh (food souvenirs/gift).

Cirebon is also known for its local cuisines and delicacies, such as empal gentong (a kind of meat and offal curry ), nasi lengko (rice mixed with bean sprouts, fried tofu, fried tempeh, topped with peanut sauce and soy sauce), nasi jamblang (rice of various side dishes), tahu gejrot (fried tofu with ground garlic, chili and shallot, topped with thin and sweet soy sauce), tahu petis (dry fried tofu served with petis dip sauce), tahu tek-tek (fried tofu topped with peanut sauce and mixed with vegetables) and ayam panggang (barbecue chicken). Another native food is "Docang" (lontong with sour vegetable soup).

The snack kue gapit originates from the region.

== Tourism ==
The main boulevard is Jalan Siliwangi and it runs from the train station to the canal via the Pasar Pagi ("Morning Market"), and then the street becomes Jalan Karanggetas along which are most of Cirebon's banks, restaurants, and hotels. There are a number of historic buildings and other key sites in Cirebon, some of them in an advanced state of decay, including the buildings of the several kratons, the Sang Cipta Rasa Grand Mosque, and the Gua Sunyaragi Park.

Wali Songo, especially Sunan Gunung Jati, is known to have influenced the city's history. Sunan Gunung Jati's grave is located several kilometres outside the city in the Gunung Jati district. There are two temples and a cave system built by two Chinese architects around the 1880s, decorated by Chinese and Western porcelain. The village of Trusmi, about five kilometers outside of Cirebon, has been noted for batik production. Plangon is a habitat of monkeys.

Mt Ceremai, the highest peak in West Java, is a large volcano situated about 40 km to the south of Cirebon. Parks and other tourist spots on the slopes of Mt Ceremai are popular places for groups from Cirebon to visit during weekends to escape from the hotter climate on the coast. The village of Linggajati, near the town of Cilimus, where the Linggadjati Agreement was signed is one such place which bus loads of tourists call in at.

== Public service ==
Nearly 93% of the population has been underserved by service water from PDAM Cirebon, the majority of customers in the city's water supply to households (90.37% or as many as 59,006) of the total number of existing connections (65,287).

== Health ==
Since the Dutch East Indies government, Cirebon City has had a hospital named Orange, which unveiled its use on August 31, 1921, and commenced operations from September 1, 1921.

In 2009 in the city of Cirebon has been available about 6 general hospitals, four maternity hospitals, 21 health centers, 15 health centers Maid, 20 Mobile Health Center, and 81 Pharmacies and Drug Stores 31. With the number of medical personnel such as specialist doctors about 94 people, and 116 general practitioners, 37 dentists, 847 nurses and 278 midwives.
