= Kue gapit =

Indonesian traditional snack

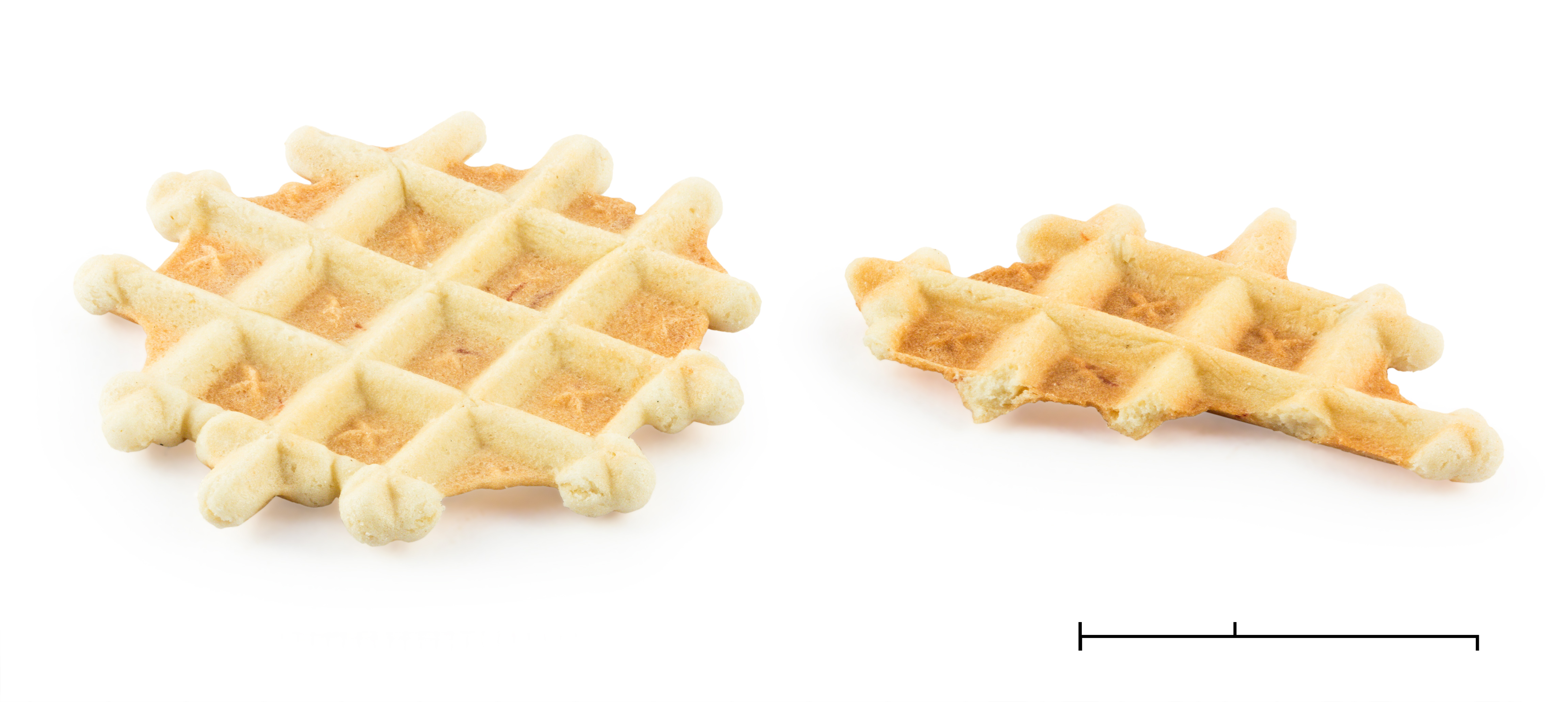
- Whole (left) and partial kue gapit; scale bar shows 1 cm / 1″
- Type: Snack (Kue)
- Place of origin: Indonesia
- Region or state: Cirebon, West Java
- Main ingredients: Tapioca; Egg

Kue gapit is an Indonesian kue kering (dry snack) which originates from Cirebon, West Java. Generally made from tapioca flour, its name comes from the cooking process, in which it is grilled between iron molds like a waffle. The snack comes in a variety of shapes and flavors. Though it is a popular souvenir among visitors to Cirebon, residents of the region rarely eat it.

== Preparation ==
One recipe for Kue Gapit from the Indonesian magazine Femina calls for wheat, rice flour, chicken eggs, coconut water, salt, sugar, and cinnamon. The egg is first beaten, then the cinnamon and sugar is mixed in. Once the egg has been absorbed by the mixture, the flour and salt is added, and this concoction is mixed further. After adding the coconut water, a tablespoon of the mixture is added between iron molds and grilled until it has been cooked. This is repeated until the mixture is used up. The resulting Kue are then stored for later consumption. Generally, however, tapioca is used rather than this mix of flours. The kue can be eaten on its own, or as a side dish.

Numerous flavors are available, including chocolate, sesame seed, cheese, ginger, prawn, and balado (spicy). Additional flavorings are added during the mixing process. The molds come in a variety of shapes and sizes, though those with waffle-like square patterns are common; molds with space for more than one kue are available.

== Description ==
The name gapit comes from the cooking process, in which the kue are cooked between iron molds; this is known as mengapit in Indonesian. Kue gapit can be differentiated from semprong and simping, which are prepared in a similar fashion, by its size. Whereas simping, which originates from Purwakarta, is large and thin, gapit is smaller and thicker.

The cakes are traditional in the Cirebon area of West Java. Other snacks from the region include lantak, ladu, doplak, klitik, and intip gunung jati. Kue gapit is frequently purchased as a souvenir (oleh-oleh), and production is a common source of income in the region. In the lead up to Lebaran, sales are known to double. However, the local residents of Cirebon rarely eat the kue; the Cirebon Post attributes this to a lack of knowledge of the food's heritage value and the ready availability of factory-produced snacks.

== See also ==
- Wafer
- Waffle
