= Tarling =

Tarling is a surname. Notable people with the surname include:

- Finlay Tarling (2006-2026), Welsh cyclist, brother of Josh
- Josh Tarling (born 2004), Welsh cyclist, brother of Finlay
- Nicholas Tarling (1931-2017), English historian, academic and author
- William J. Tarling, author of Cafe Royal Cocktail Book (1937)
