= Nasi jamblang =

Western Javan rice dish

Coordinates: 6°43′0″S 108°34′0″E

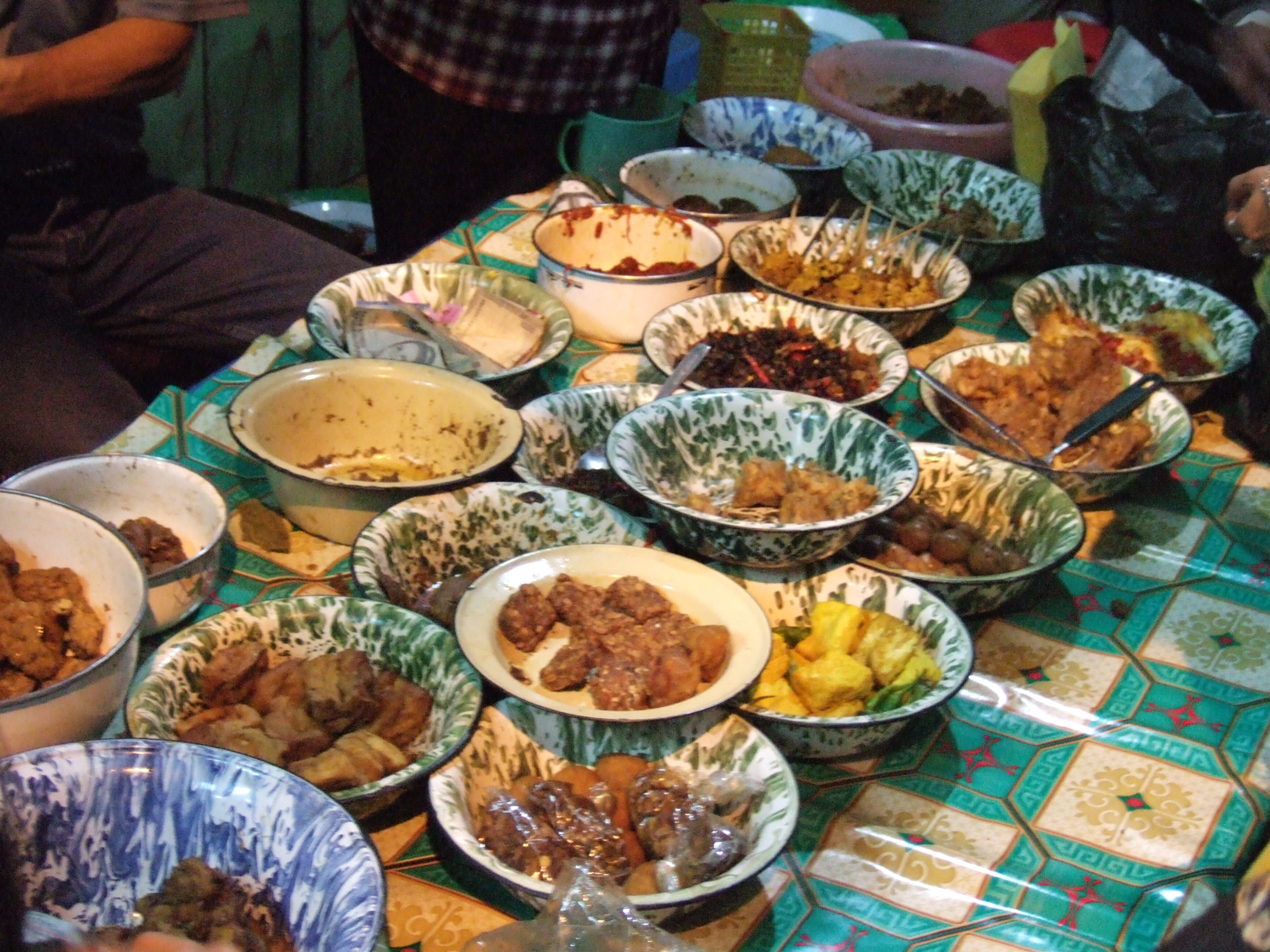
- Nasi jamblang and side dishes
- Alternative names: Sega jamblang (Cirebonese or Javanese)
- Course: Main course
- Place of origin: Indonesia
- Region or state: West Java
- Created by: Cirebonese
- Serving temperature: hot or room temperature

Nasi jamblang (Javanese: Sega jamblang) is a typical food of Cirebon, West Java. The "jamblang" term comes from the name of the region to the west of the city of Cirebon, where food vendors first sold the dish. A characteristic feature of the dish is the use of teak leaves to pack the rice. The dish is served buffet-style.

== History ==
Nasi jamblang is a traditional Cirebonese food originally served to the forced labourers who built the Great Post Road from Anyer to Panarukan which passes through Cirebon Regency during the Dutch colonial era.

== Menu ==
Dishes available usually include chili fries, tofu, vegetables, lung/liver/meat stews, satay, potatoes, fried scrambled eggs, stewed chili fish, salted fish, and tempeh.

== See also ==
- Empal gentong
- Warung
