= Empal gentong =

Indonesian beef soup

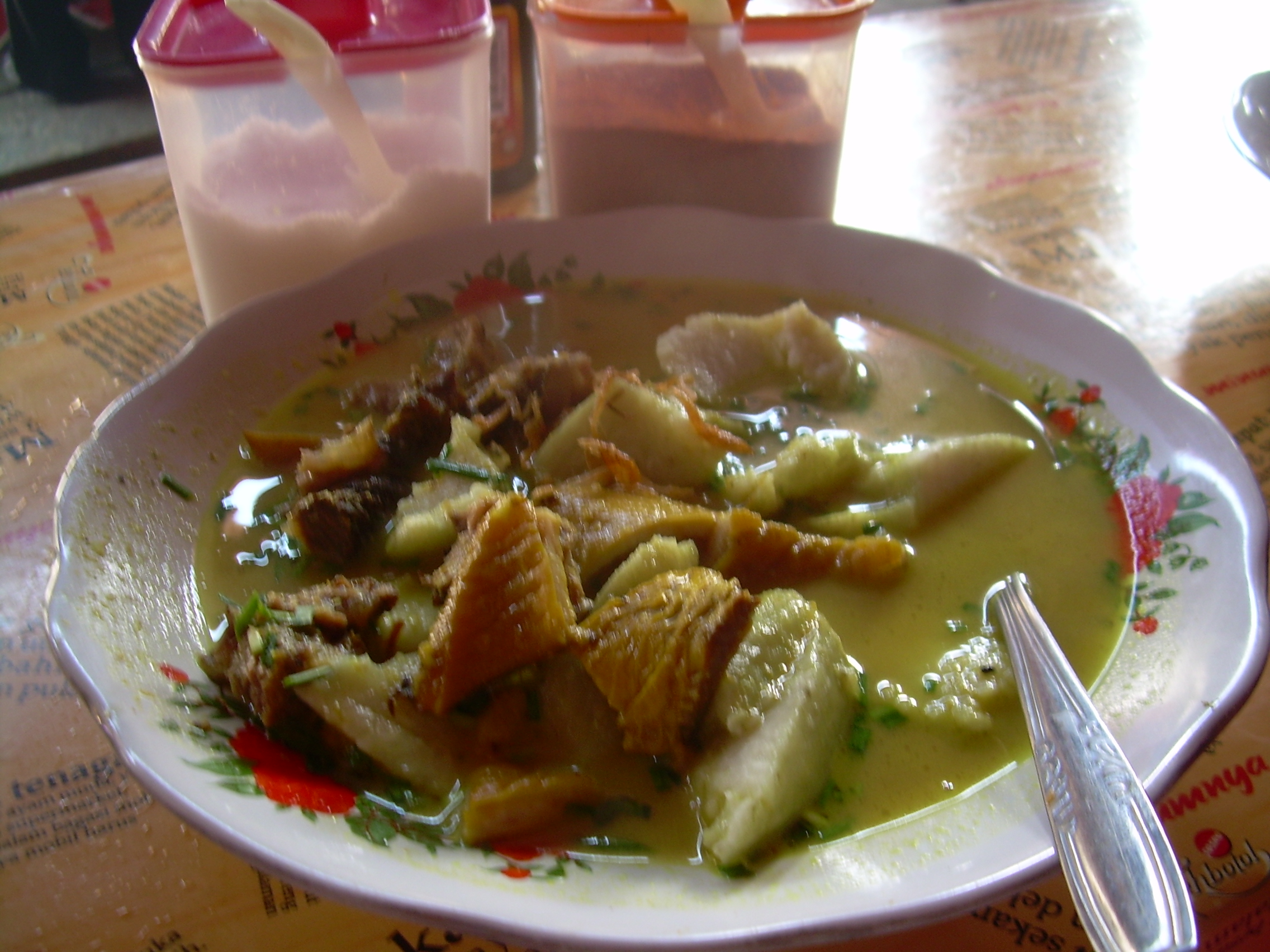
- Empal gentong
- Course: Main course
- Place of origin: Indonesia
- Region or state: Cirebon, West Java
- Serving temperature: Hot
- Main ingredients: Various beef and offal in spicy soup

Empal gentong is a spicy Indonesian curry-like beef soup originating in Cirebon, West Java. It is a variety of the Soto cuisine and is similar to gulai which is usually cooked with firewood in a gentong stove (Javanese for clay pot). The ingredients include cuts of beef and cow offal such as intestine, tripes, lungs, etc. cooked with curry-like spices in coconut milk, garlic, chilies, chives (kuchai), and sambal in the form of chili powder. Empal gentong can be eaten with steamed rice, ketupat or lontong. It is originated in Battembat, Tengah Tani, and Cirebon Regency.

== See also ==
- Soto
- List of Indonesian soups
