= Cirebon metropolitan area =

Metropolitan Area in West Java, Indonesia

Rebana Metropolitan
- Metropolitan Area
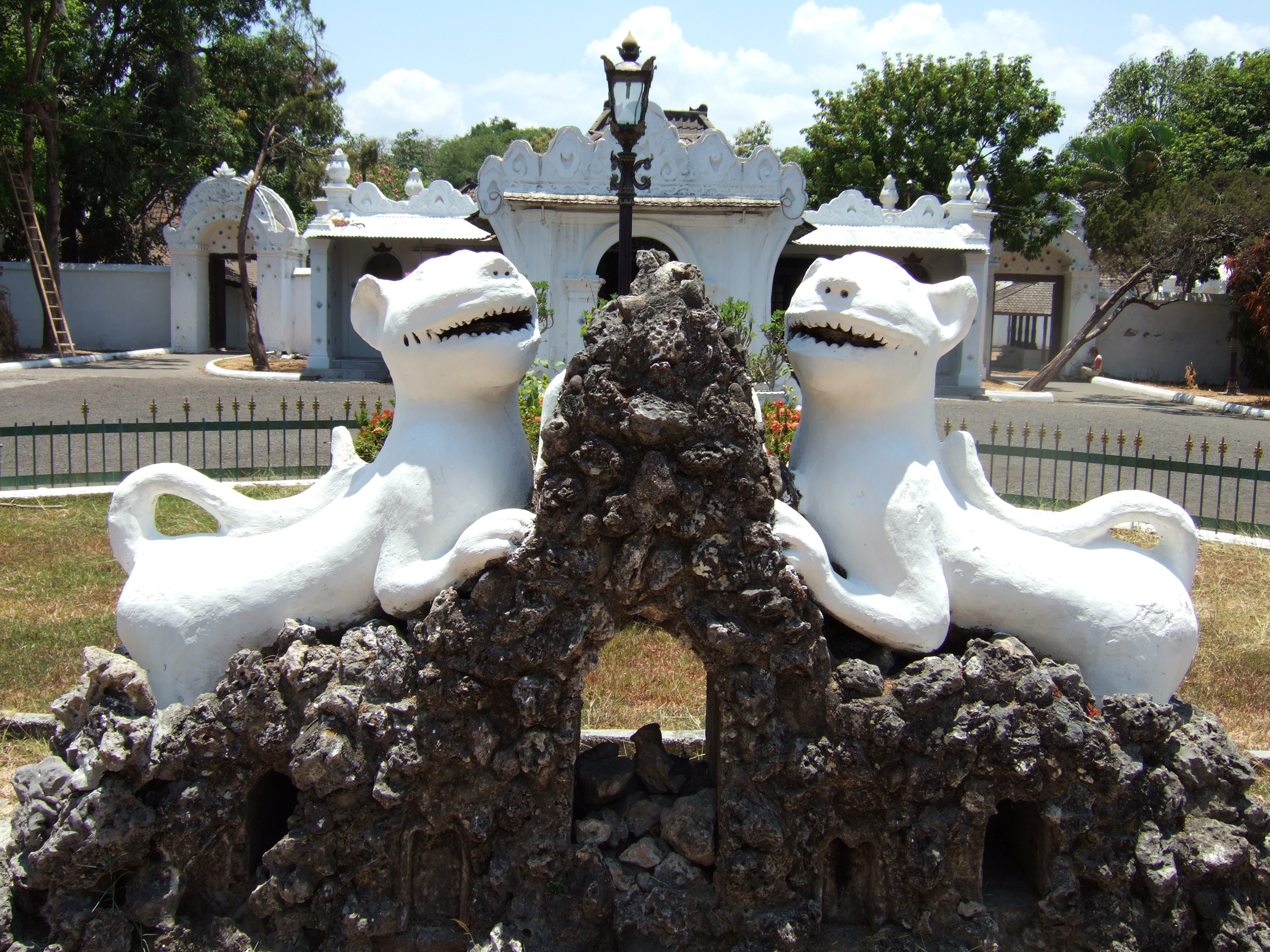
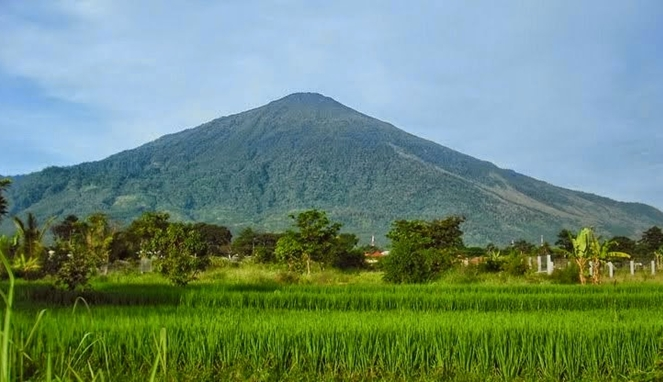
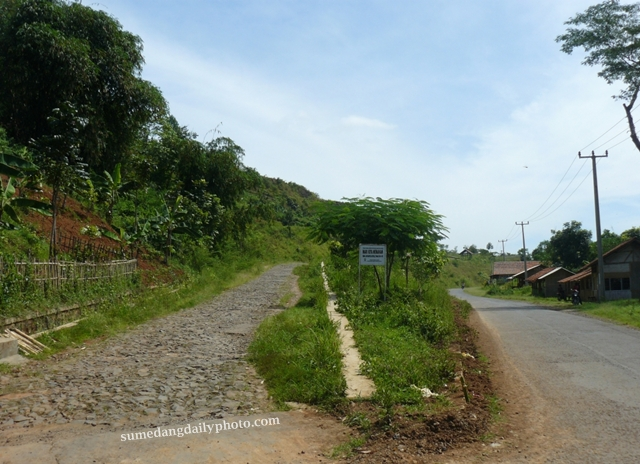
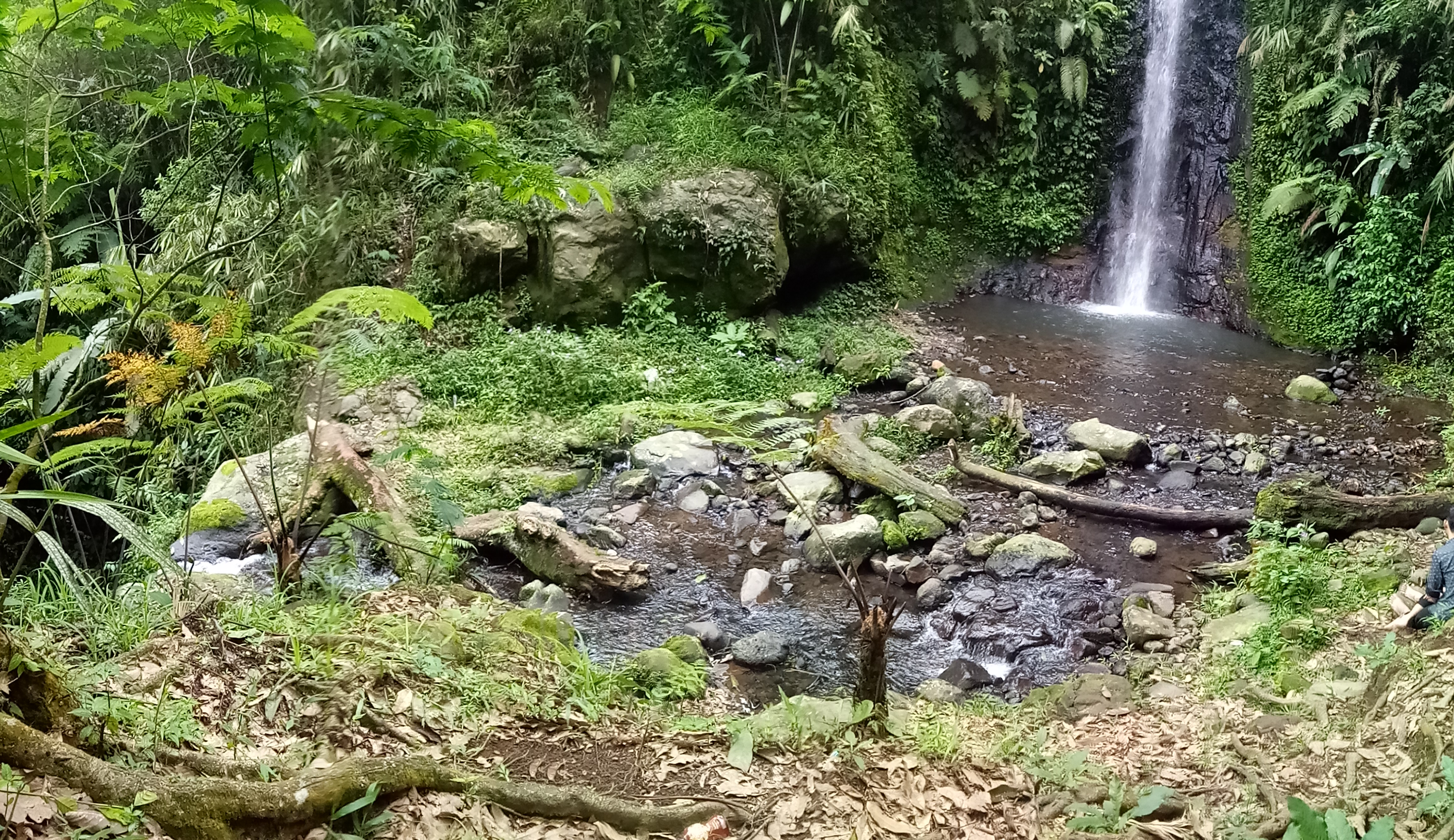
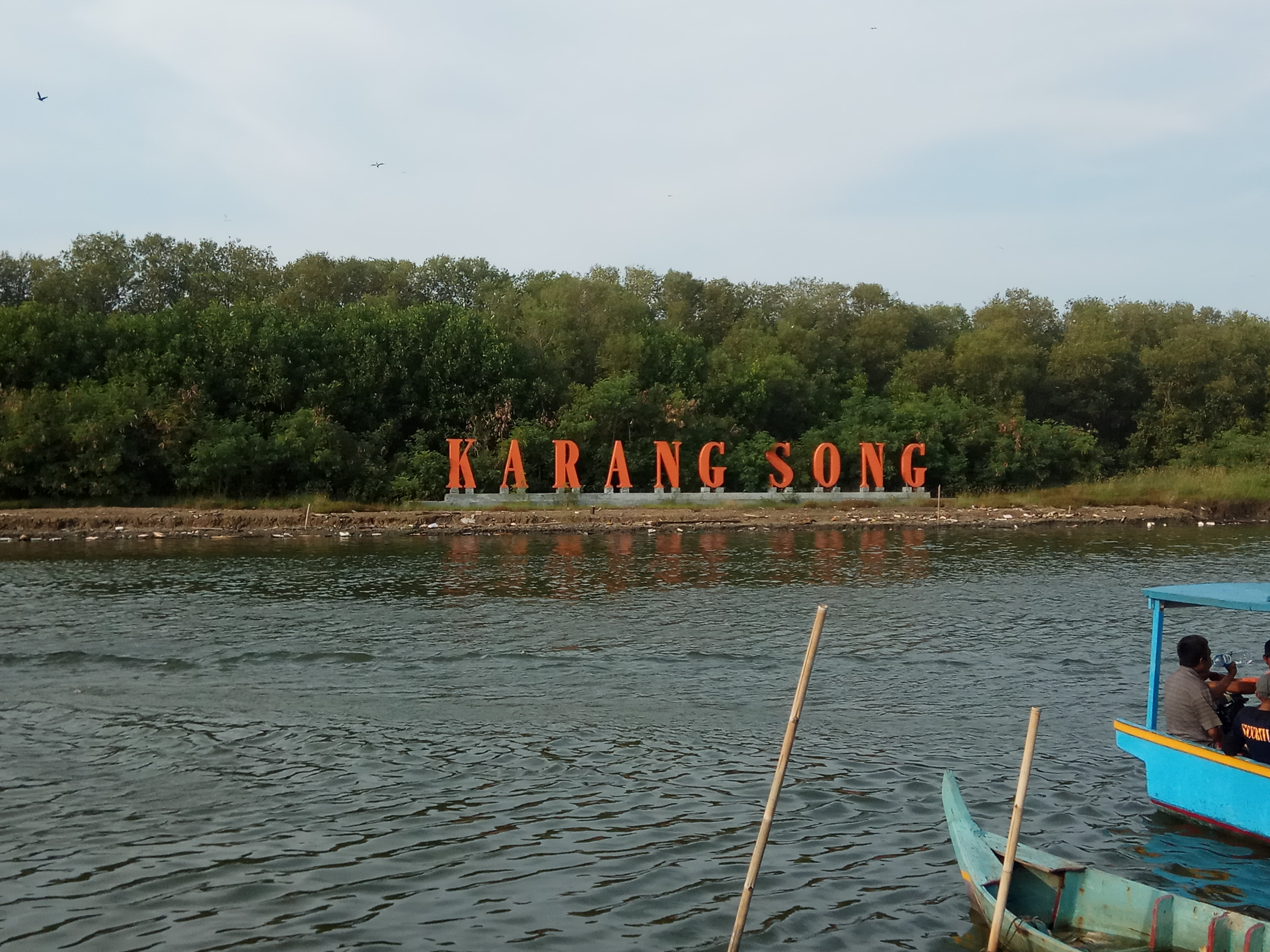
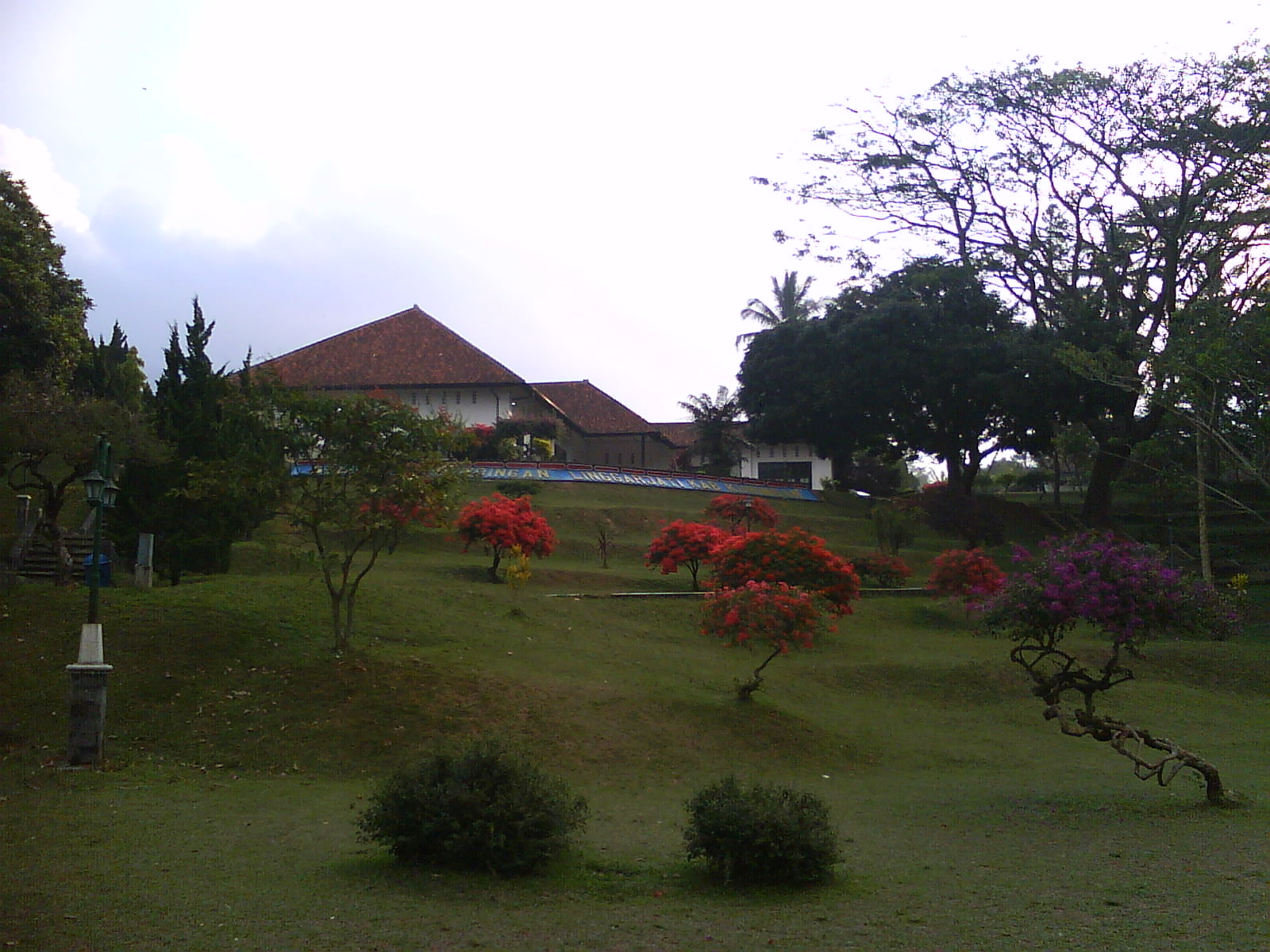
- From top, left to right: Kasepuhan Palace Cirebon, Panoramic Ceremai Mountain, Area Cadas Pangeran Sumedang, Mandala Waterfall Subang, Karangsong Beach, The Building where the Linggadjati Agreement was held.
- Country: Indonesia

Government
  - Chief Executive Officer: Bernardus Djonoputro
- Time zone: UTC+7 (Indonesia Western Time)
- Area code: +62

The region of Rebana or Rebana Metropolitan Area is a metropolitan region located in West Java province, Indonesia. Designated area initiated by Ridwan Kamil, the Governor of West Java, Rebana is an area that encompasses the core urban areas of Cirebon-Patimban-Kertajati, along with its supporting areas such as Cirebon Regency, Sumedang Regency, Indramayu Regency, and Kuningan Regency.

Rebana Area consists of seven regencies/cities: the City of Cirebon, Subang Regency, Indramayu Regency, Cirebon Regency, Majalengka Regency, Sumedang Regency, and Kuningan Regency. These areas are functionally interconnected and offer various economic activities, social activities, built-up areas, and a minimum population of one million inhabitants.

The Metropolitan Rebana Area was firstly established based on the Presidential Regulation of the Republic of Indonesia Number 87 of 2021 regarding the Acceleration of Development in the Rebana Area and the Southern Part of West Java, the Governor Regulation of West Java Number 84 of 2020 concerning the Development Action Plan for the Rebana Area 2020–2030, and the Governor Regulation of West Java Number 85 of 2020 regarding the management board of the Rebana Area.

The Metropolitan Rebana Area is connected to supporting infrastructure for regional connectivity, such as the Trans-Java toll road, double-track railway, cargo and passenger terminals, as well as other supporting infrastructure such as dams, geothermal power plants, hydroelectric power plants, Balongan Oil Refinery, and waste disposal facilities. It is supported by three main hubs: Patimban Port, Kertajati International Airport, and Cirebon Port. In addition to regional connectivity, Metropolitan Rebana also encompasses 81 projects equivalent to National Strategic Projects listed in Presidential Regulation Number 87 of 2021. It covers an area of over 43,000 hectares within 13 Limited Industrial Zones in the Rebana Area.

== Metropolitan Rebana Agency ==
Cirebon Metropolitan is managed by the Rebana Area Management Agency as mandated by the Governor Regulation of West Java Number 85 of 2020 concerning the Rebana Area Management Agency. Its functions include coordination, facilitation, control, planning, monitoring, and evaluation. On April 27, 2023, Bernardus Djonoputro was appointed by Governor of West Java Ridwan Kamil as the chief executive officer of the Rebana Area Management Agency.

== Demographics ==
Population density of Java and Madura by subdistrict as of 2022, with major urban areas shown

The city's population was 298,224 at the Indonesia census of 2010. The official estimate as at mid-2023 was 341,980. As with other coastal cities in Indonesia, a large population of ethnic Chinese has flocked into the city as a result of long-term Chinese immigration since the 17th century. Other communities include Malays, Koreans, Arabs, Indians, Japanese. Significant suburbs lie within densely populated Cirebon Regency, and the official metropolitan area encompasses this entire regency as well as the city.

Administrative division	Area (km^{2})	Pop'n (2010 census)	Pop'n (2015 census)	Pop'n (2020 census)	Pop'n mid 2023 estimate	Pop'n density 2023 (per km^{2})
Cirebon City	39.48	296,389	307,319	333,303	341,980	8,662
Cirebon Regency	1,076.76	2,067,196	2,124,866	2,270,621	2,360,441	2,192
Greater Cirebon	1,116.24	2,363,585	2,432,185	2,603,924	2,702,421	2,421

== Economy ==
Cirebon's economy is influenced by its geographical location and natural resources. Its economy is dominated by manufacturing, trade, hotels and restaurants, transport and communications, and service sectors. Tomé Pires in the Suma Oriental around the year 1513 mentioned Cirebon was one of the trade centers on the island of Java. After Cirebon was taken over by the Dutch East Indies government in 1859, it was designated as a transit port for import-export goods and as a communications route to the political control center for the region in the interior of Java.

== See also ==
- List of metropolitan areas by population
- Jakarta metropolitan area
- Semarang metropolitan area
- Bandung metropolitan area
