= At-Taqwa Mosque =

Masjid At-Taqwa or At-Taqwa Mosque may relate to:

- At-Taqwa Mosque, Taiwan
- At-Taqwa Mosque, Cirebon, Jawa, Indonesia
- Masjid Al-Taqua, Singapore
- At-Taqwa Mosque (Ketapang)
- Akbar At-Taqwa Grand Mosque, Indonesia
- Masjid Taqwa Muhammadiyah
- At-Taqwa Mosque, Medan Area University
- Masjid Al-Taqwa (Altadena, California)
