= UEDF Fish & Chips =

Fish and chip shop in Altadena, California, U.S.

- Interactive map of UEDF Fish & Chips

Restaurant information
- Established: 1998; 28 years ago
- Closed: January 2025; 1 year ago
- Owner: Abdul Muhammad
- Food type: Fish and chips
- Dress code: Casual
- Location: 2191 Lake Avenue, Altadena, California, 91001, United States
- Coordinates: 34°11′0.8″N 118°8′4.3″W

UEDF Fish & Chips was a fish and chip shop in Altadena, California, that operated from 1998 until the business was destroyed during the January 2025 Eaton Fire.

== Overview ==
UEDF Fish & Chips was founded in 1998 by Abdul Muhammad, originally to help the Masjid Al-Taqwa move from its previous location on Fair Oaks Avenue to its later location on Lake Avenue, both in Altadena.

The acronym "UEDF" stands for the United Economic Development Fund, a non-profit organization established by Muhammad to aid in the economic empowerment of Altadena's local African American community. Both the UEDF and the restaurant shared facilities, with Muhammad and his wife, Regina C. Grimes, purchasing both the property hosting both entities and the building for the Masjid Al-Taqwa which was located next door.

The restaurant was destroyed in the 2025 Eaton Fire. The Los Angeles Conservancy listed UEDF Fish & Chips as one of the historic places destroyed by the fire.

== Menu and offerings ==
UEDF Fish & Chips was noted for serving halal fried chicken, coleslaw, yams, potato salad, black-eyed peas, and hushpuppies, in addition to standard fish and chips made with either tilapia, catfish or red snapper.

The restaurant's fish and chips was locally regarded, leading to the San Gabriel Valley Tribune listing UEDF Fish & Chips as one of the eight best fish and chip shops in the San Gabriel Valley.
