= Jalancagak =

Village in West Java Province, Indonesia

The Jalancagak District is a district of Subang Regency in West Java. It is famous for its sweet pineapples.

Its coordinates are 6*41' S, 107*41' E.

== See also ==
- Districts of West Java
