= Subang Regency =

Regency in West Java, Indonesia

Subang Regency Kabupaten Subang
- Regency

Other transcription(s)
  - Sundanese: ᮊᮘᮥᮕᮒᮦᮔ᮪ ᮞᮥᮘᮀ
- Coat of arms
- Motto: Karya Utama Satya Nagara (Prioritizing Works for the Sake of the Country)
- Location in West Java

- Location in Java Island and Indonesia Subang Regency (Indonesia)
- Coordinates: 6°34′16″S 107°45′42″E
- Country: Indonesia
- Province: West Java
- Formation: 5 April 1948
- Legal Basic: Kep. DPRD No. 01/SK/DPRD/1977
- Anniversary: 5 April 1948
- Capital City: Subang
- Administrative division: 30 Districts; 245 Villages; 8 Official Villages

Government
  - Regent: Reynaldi Putra
  - Vice regent: Agus Masykur Rosyadi

Area
  - Total: 2,165.55 km^{2} (836.12 sq mi)
- Highest elevation: 2,084 m (6,837 ft)
- Lowest elevation: 0 m (0 ft)

Population (mid 2025 estimate)
  - Total: 1,675,519
  - Density: 773.715/km^{2} (2,003.91/sq mi)
- Demonyms: Subangite; Warga Subang (id); Urang Subang (su)

Demographic
  - Languages: Sundanese, Indonesian, Bahasa Cirebon (specifically in the coastal areas and banks of the Cipunagara river)
- Time zone: UTC+7 (Time in Indonesia)
- Postal Codes: 412xx
- Area code: +62 260
- Vehicle registration: T
- HDI: ▲0.665 (Intermediate)
- Website: subang.go.id

Subang Regency (Indonesian: Kabupaten Subang; Sundanese: ᮊᮘᮥᮕᮒᮦᮔ᮪ ᮞᮥᮘᮀ, romanized: Kabupatén Subang) is a regency (kabupaten) in West Java province of Indonesia. The Regency is bordered by the Java Sea in the north, Indramayu Regency in the east, Sumedang Regency in the southeast, West Bandung Regency in the south, and Purwakarta Regency and Karawang Regency in the west. It has an area of 2,165.55 km^{2} (836.12 mi^{2}) and its population was 1,465,157 at the 2010 census and 1,595,320 at the 2020 census; the official estimate as of mid 2025 was 1,675,159 (comprising 837,814 males and 837,705 females), and projected to rise to 1,687,343 at mid 2026. Its administrative seat is in the town of Subang.

== Administrative districts ==
Subang Regency is divided into 30 districts (kecamatan), tabulated below with their areas and their populations at the 2010 census and 2020 census, together with the official estimates as of mid 2025. The table also includes the locations of the district administrative centres, the number of administrative villages in each district (totaling 245 rural desa and 8 urban kelurahan - the latter comprising Subang (town) District), and its post code.

Kode Wilayah	Name of District (kecamatan)	Area in km^{2}	Pop'n census 2010	Pop'n census 2020	Pop'n estimate mid 2025	Admin centre	No. of villages	Post code
32.13.01	Sagalaherang	55.61	28,731	32,310	34,458	Sagalaherang	7	41282
32.13.23	Serangpanjang	71.45	24,083	25,644	26,635	Cijengkol	6	41288
32.13.12	Jalan Cagak	52.58	41,671	47,773	51,425	Jalan Cagak	7	41281
32.13.29	Ciater	63.17	27,427	29,297	30,476	Cisaat	7	41280
32.13.02	Cisalak	98.97	38,318	41,610	43,631	Cisalak	9	41283
32.13.26	Kasomalang	49.48	39,480	42,781	44,813	Kasomalang Wetan	8	41287
32.13.14	Tanjung Siang	62.99	42,404	44,975	46,625	Sirap	10	41284
32.13.19	Cijambe	110.85	38,427	41,396	43,239	Cirangkong	8	41286
32.13.17	Cibogo	64.52	40,177	47,244	51,484	Cibogo	9	41285
32.13.03	Subang (town)	60.22	120,346	137,284	147,424	Karanganyar	8 ^{(a)}	41211: 41215
32.13.04	Kalijati	90.11	59,677	65,851	69,587	Kalijati Timur	10	41271
32.13.27	Dawuan	92.73	37,898	41,454	43,621	Dawuan Kaler	10	41270
32.13.20	Cipeundeuy	97.33	44,594	48,902	51,521	Cipeundeuy	7	41272
32.13.05	Pabuaran	75.37	59,819	64,047	66,700	Pabuaran	8	41262
32.13.16	Patok Beusi	91.84	76,998	81,873	84,980	Ciberes	10	41263
32.13.06	Purwadadi	78.11	57,578	59,434	60,811	Pasir Bungur	10	41261
32.13.22	Cikaum	75.32	46,038	50,372	53,012	Cikaum Barat	9	41266
32.13.07	Pagaden	49.35	58,834	63,138	65,827	Pagaden	10	41251
32.13.28	Pagaden Barat (West Pagaden)	51.84	33,905	35,435	35,583	Bendungan	9	41252
32.13.18	Cipunagara	106.37	59,342	64,333	67,403	Tanjung	10	41257
32.13.15	Compreng	75.34	43,823	48,981	52,082	Jatireja	8	41258
32.13.08	Binong	52.54	42,937	46,764	49,106	Cicadas	9	41253
32.13.25	Tambakdahan	63.76	40,428	43,799	45,875	Tambakdahan	9	41267
32.13.09	Ciasem	108.61	101,924	110,256	115,396	Ciasem Girang	9	41256
32.13.11	Pamanukan	30.01	55,128	58,704	60,975	Pamanukan	8	41264
32.13.24	Sukasari	59.65	39,567	42,332	43,070	Sukamaju	7	41250
32.13.30	Pusakanagara	59.52	38,253	43,598	46,798	Pusakaratu	7	41265
32.13.10	Pusakajaya	52.56	44,668	48,263	50,485	Kebondanas	8	41255
32.13.21	Legon Kulon	64.02	21,770	23,842	25,103	Legonkulon	7	41254
32.13.13	Blanakan	103.13	60,912	64,214	66,374	Blanakan	9	41259
	Totals	2,165.55	1,465,157	1,595,320	1,675,519		253	

Note: (a) The 253 villages comprise 245 rural desa and 8 urban kelurahan - the latter being the 8 villages in Subang (town) District - Cigadung, Dangdeur, Karanganyar, Parung, Pasirkareumbi, Soklat, Sukamelang and Wanareja.

== Tourism ==
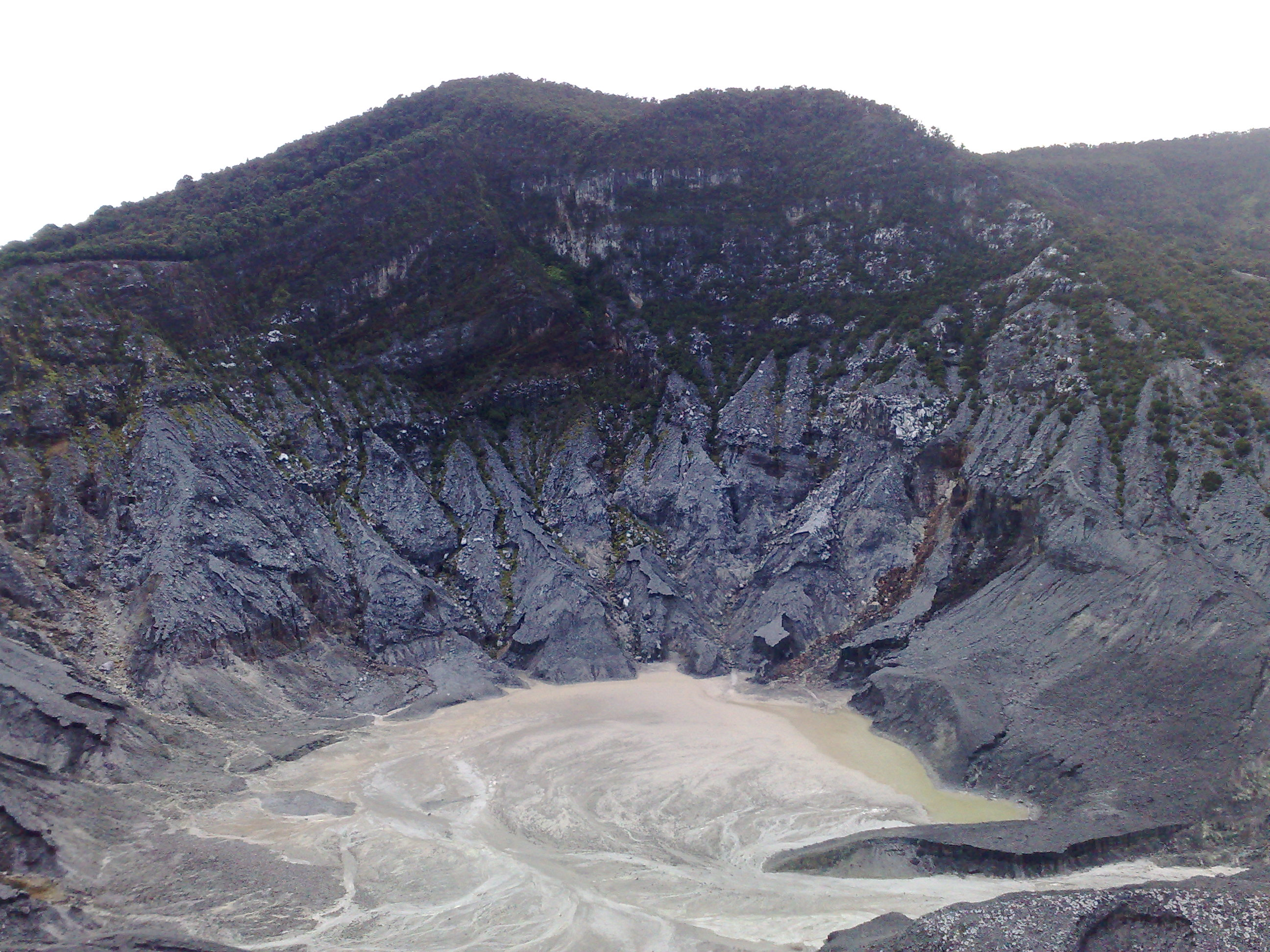
The biggest crater, Kawah Ratu or Queen Crater of Mount Tangkuban Perahu, Subang, West Java

Subang has a variety of artistic and cultural interest.

=== Attractions ===
==== In South Subang ====
A number of resorts exist in the Subang area to the north of Bandung. These include the following:

- Mount Tangkuban Perahu
- Sari Ater Hot Spring Resort
- Ciater Spa Resort
- Villa Cempaka Ciater
- Cijalu Waterfall
- Capolaga Adventure Camp
- Sari Bunihayu Art and Tradition Field Tourist
- Ciater Highland Resort
- Lembah Gunung Kujang Fishing Tourism

==== In Central Subang ====
- Ciheuleut Swimming Pool
- Planet Waterboom

==== Historical and religious tourism ====
- Wisma Karya Building
- Masjid Agung Subang City
- Gedong Gede (en : Big Building)
- Kalijati Historic Building

The handover of the Republic of Indonesia from the Netherlands to Japan, before independence, 1942. These buildings are in Lanud Suryadharma, Kalijati District.

==== In North Subang ====
- Blanakan Crocodile Breeding
- Patimban Beach
- Pondok Bali Beach
- Bintang Fantasy Swimming Pool

==== The Culinary ====
- Nanas khas subang / Subang pineapple
- Kerupuk miskin purwadadi / Indonesian Crackers
- Sundanese foods

== Toll road access ==
KM	Toll Road	Toll Gate	Destination
98	Cikopo-Palimanan Toll Road	Kalijati	Kalijati, Purwadadi, Sukamandi
110	Cikopo-Palimanan Toll Road	Subang	Subang, Pamanukan, Lembang
76	Sadang	Purbaleunyi Toll Road	Sadang, Purwakarta, Subang
127	Pasteur	Purbaleunyi Toll Road	Pasteur, Lembang

== Patimban Deep Sea Port ==
Patimban Deep Sea Port is under construction seaport at Subang, West Java, as an upgrade from the existing small Patimban Port. It is located about 70 kilometres from the Karawang Industrial Estate and 145 kilometres from the city center of Jakarta, where many Japanese industrial firms, particularly automotive manufacturers operate. The project was initialized in 2017 and the first stage was operational in 2020, with the second stage being scheduled for completion by 2027.

== See also ==
- Cipunagara River
