= At-Taqwa Mosque, Cirebon =

Mosque in Cirebon, West Java, Indonesia

At-Taqwa Grand Mosque Masjid Raya At-Taqwa Cirebon مسجد رايا التقوى
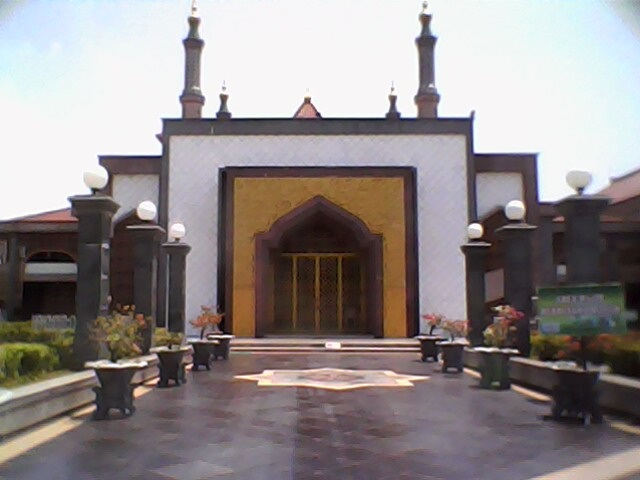

Religion
- Affiliation: Islam
- Branch/tradition: Sunni

Location
- Location: Cirebon, West Java, Indonesia
- Interactive map of At-Taqwa Grand Mosque; Masjid Raya At-Taqwa Cirebon مسجد رايا التقوى

Architecture
- Type: Mosque
- Style: Javanese style
- Completed: 1918
- Construction cost: 9.2 billion rupiah

Specifications
- Capacity: 5,500
- Minaret: 5
- Minaret height: 65 m (maximum)

Website
- https://attaqwacirebon.com/

At-Taqwa Mosque or At-Taqwa Grand Mosque is a historical mosque in the city of Cirebon, West Java, founded in 1918. Today it is one of the congregational mosques in Cirebon and considered an icon of the city. The mosque also provides Islamic learning as well as public services such as blood donation and a free ambulance.

== History ==
The mosque was founded in a village called Kejaksan. Initially, it consisted of two sections: one is used as the mosque called Tajug Agung (the present At-Taqwa Mosque), and the other half is used as an alun-alun (the present Kejaksan Square).

The mosque was initially named Tajug Agung, but due to the aging structure and the rising demand for an increased prayer capacity, R.M. Arhatha, then head of the Cirebon City Council of Religious Affairs, had the idea to renovate Tajug Agung and rename it At-Taqwa Mosque.

The name Tajug Agung roughly corresponds to the "Great Mosque" and as there was already a great mosque located in the Kasepuhan (the present-day Great Mosque of Sang Cipta Rasa), the officials considered two mosques with the name "great mosque" is unjustifiable. In 1951 the reconstruction of the mosque began and it was inaugurated as At-Taqwa in 1963.

== Architecture ==
The mosque has characteristics of Javanese Islamic architectural style with a jurai roof and is equipped with four small minarets and the main minaret with the height of 65 meters. The gold color inscription with a two-sentence shahada calligraphy dominates the facade. The inscriptions are made of glass-reinforced cement on top of the original granite from Brazil. The white frame further accentuates the golden color of the gate.

The six pillars of the garden lamp decorate the entrance to the gate. The entire floor and walls of the mosque use granite, as well as the pillars in the mosque. The columns are decorated with Islamic architectural ornaments. Unlike other buildings, the walls are not equipped with glass-covered windows. The large windows are left open to let the air flow smoothly in and out of the mosque. Shade is provided outside the mosque by planting 10 date palms in the side yard which is close to the street, complemented by the two fountains on both sides.
