= Patimban Deep Sea Port =

Seaport in Indonesia

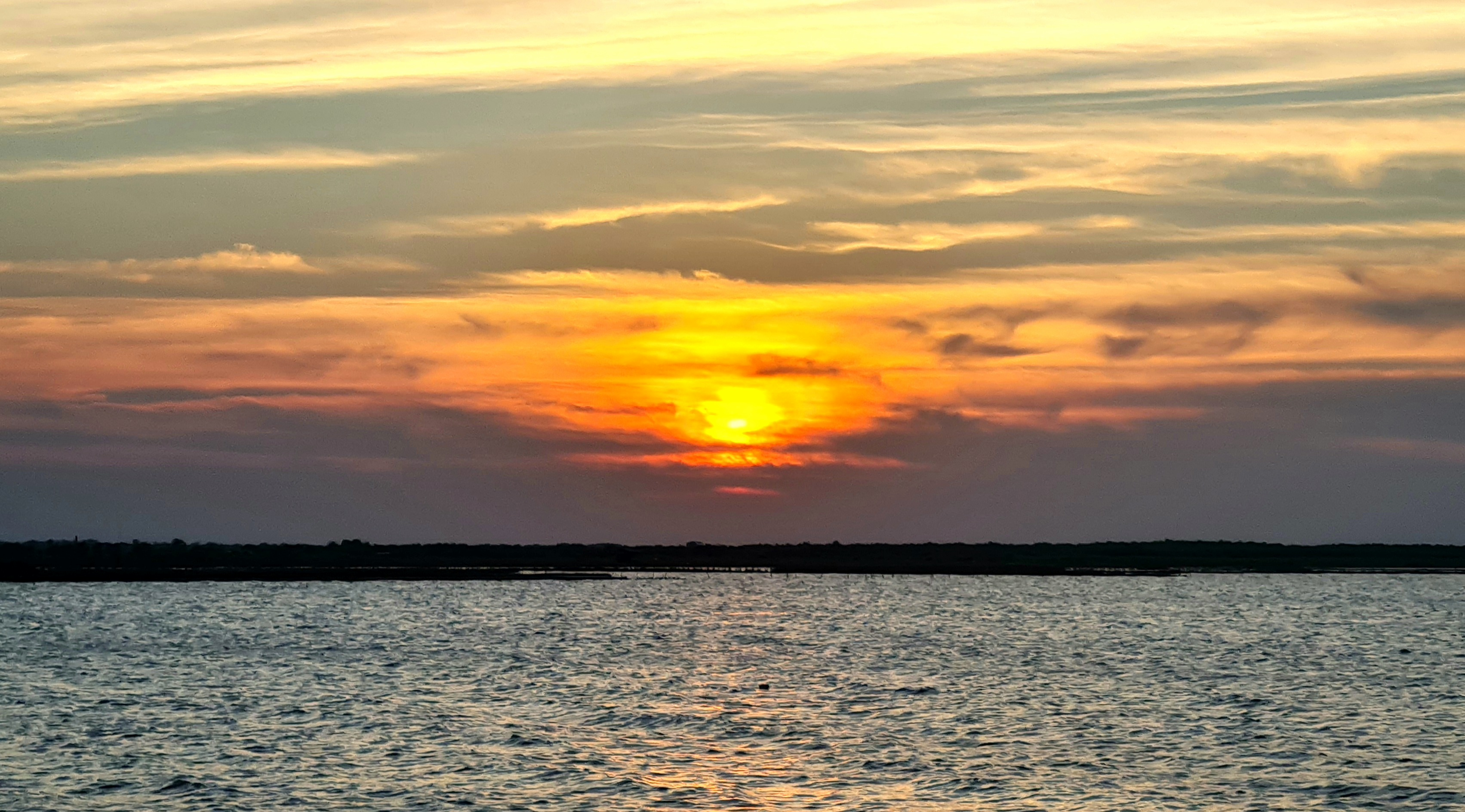
- Sunset near Patimban Deep Sea Port
- Interactive map of Patimban Deep Sea Port

Location
- Country: Indonesia
- Location: Pusakanagara, Subang Regency
- Coordinates: 6.244°S 107.90149°E

Details
- Owned by: PT Pelabuhan Patimban Internasional

Statistics
- Website; Official website

Patimban Deep Sea Port is a seaport at Subang Regency, West Java, Indonesia. It is located about 70 kilometers from the Karawang Industrial Estate and 145 kilometers from the city center of capital Jakarta, where many Japanese industrial firms, particularly automotive manufacturers operate. The port comprises a total area of 654 hectares in which 300 hectares will be specialized for intermodal containers and vehicle terminals while the remaining 354 hectares will be used as a back-up area. The port development is expected to be fully completed by 2027. The port operation was officially inaugurated by President Joko Widodo on 20 December 2020 after completion of first phase construction.

Patimban port is expected to be Indonesia’s primary export port. It is also expected to solve the overcapacity of Tanjung Priok Port and traffic congestion in Jakarta from the transport of cargo. Patimban Port was first operated by state-run shipping company Pelindo but later the management handed over jointly by Pelabuhan Patimban International (PPI) and Toyota Tshusho Corporation, the trading arm of Japanese auto giant Toyota Motor Corporation.

== History and development ==
The deep sea port was planned to build at Cilamaya, but that was too close to an oil and gas field operated by Pertamina. It was decided to shift the location at Patimban in 2015. There is already a small operating sea port at Patimban. Patimban Port would complement Tanjung Priok Port in the future. Patimban port is declared as a National Strategic Project to expedite the construction.

Total cost of the project is estimated to cost Rp 43 trillion (US$3.29 billion) and the first phase of its construction will cost Rp 17 trillion (US$1.5 billion). Japan International Cooperation Agency (JICA) announced it was ready to sign a loan agreement with the government of Indonesia to finance the project. The port is being built by a consortium of five companies: Japan's Penta-Ocean Construction, TOA Corporation, Rinkai Nissan Construction and Indonesian state-owned construction companies PT Wijaya Karya and PT Pembangunan Perumahan.

The port will be able to handle containers of 3.5 million twenty-foot equivalent units (TEUs) when the first stage is completed in 2020. The capacity will be expanded to 5.5 million TEUs in the second stage and then to 7.5 million TEUs in the final stage by 2027, which is half the capacity of Jakarta’s Tanjung Priok Port, the busiest port of Indonesia.

== Land transport ==
A toll road of approximately 37 kilometers from Cipali Toll Road will connect the port, which is expected to complete by June, 2020.

== See also ==
- Cipunagara river
- List of Indonesian ports
- Ministry of Transportation, Indonesia
- Transport in Indonesia
- Subang Regency
