= Cirebon =

City in West Java, Indonesia

Cirebon: Caruban; Cheribon
- City
- City of Cirebon; Kota Cirebon

Regional transcription(s)
  - Javanese: ꦕꦶꦉꦧꦺꦴꦤ꧀
  - Sundanese: ᮓᮚᮩᮂ ᮎᮤᮛᮨᮘᮧᮔ᮪
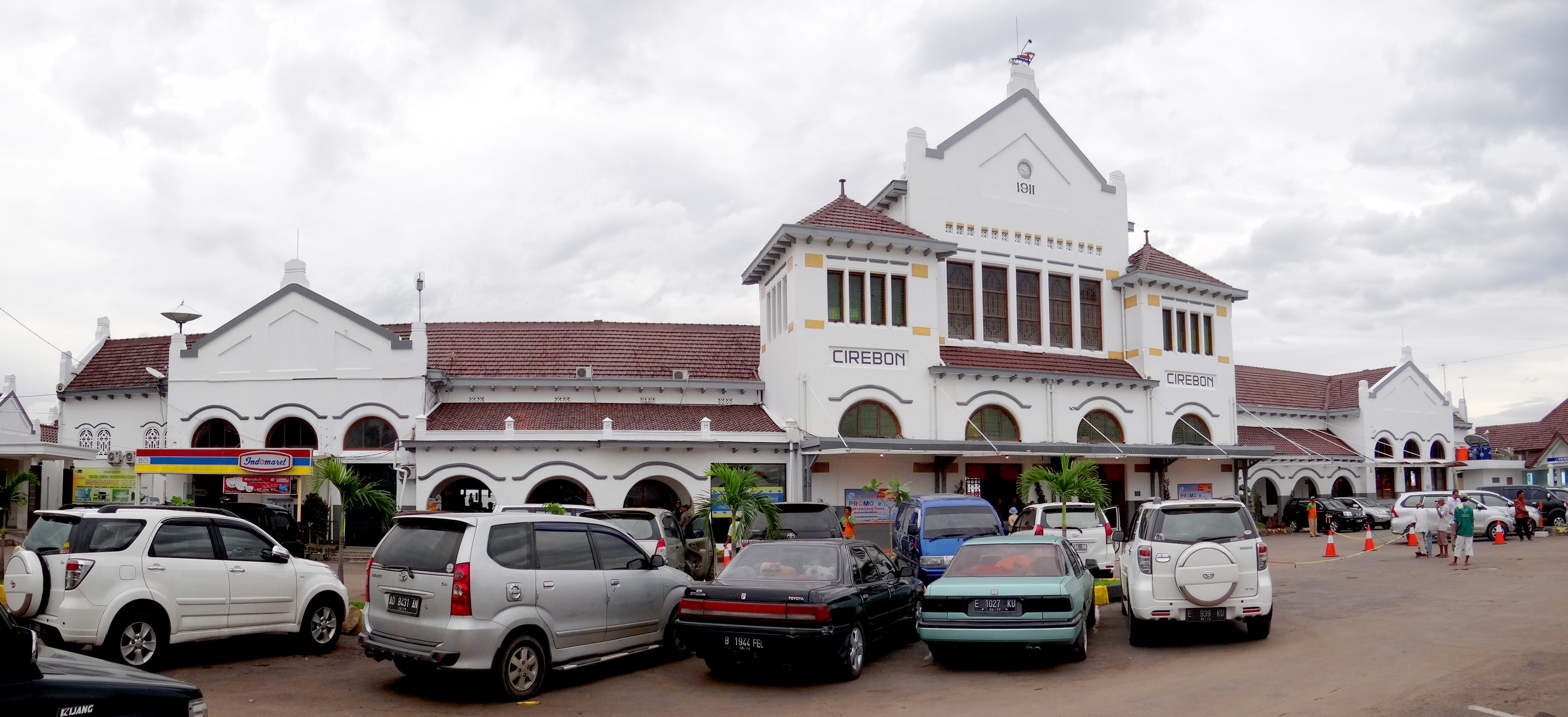
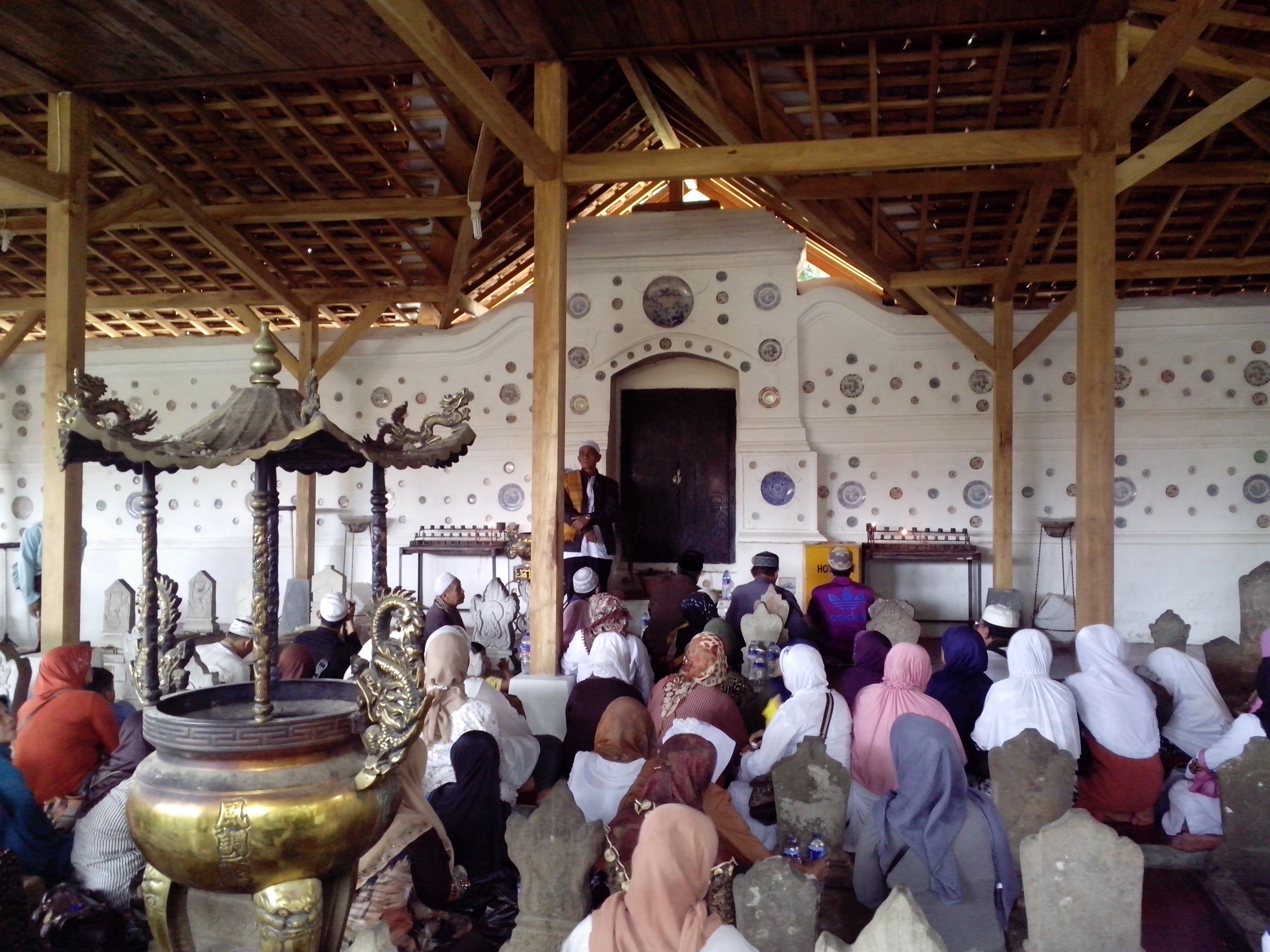
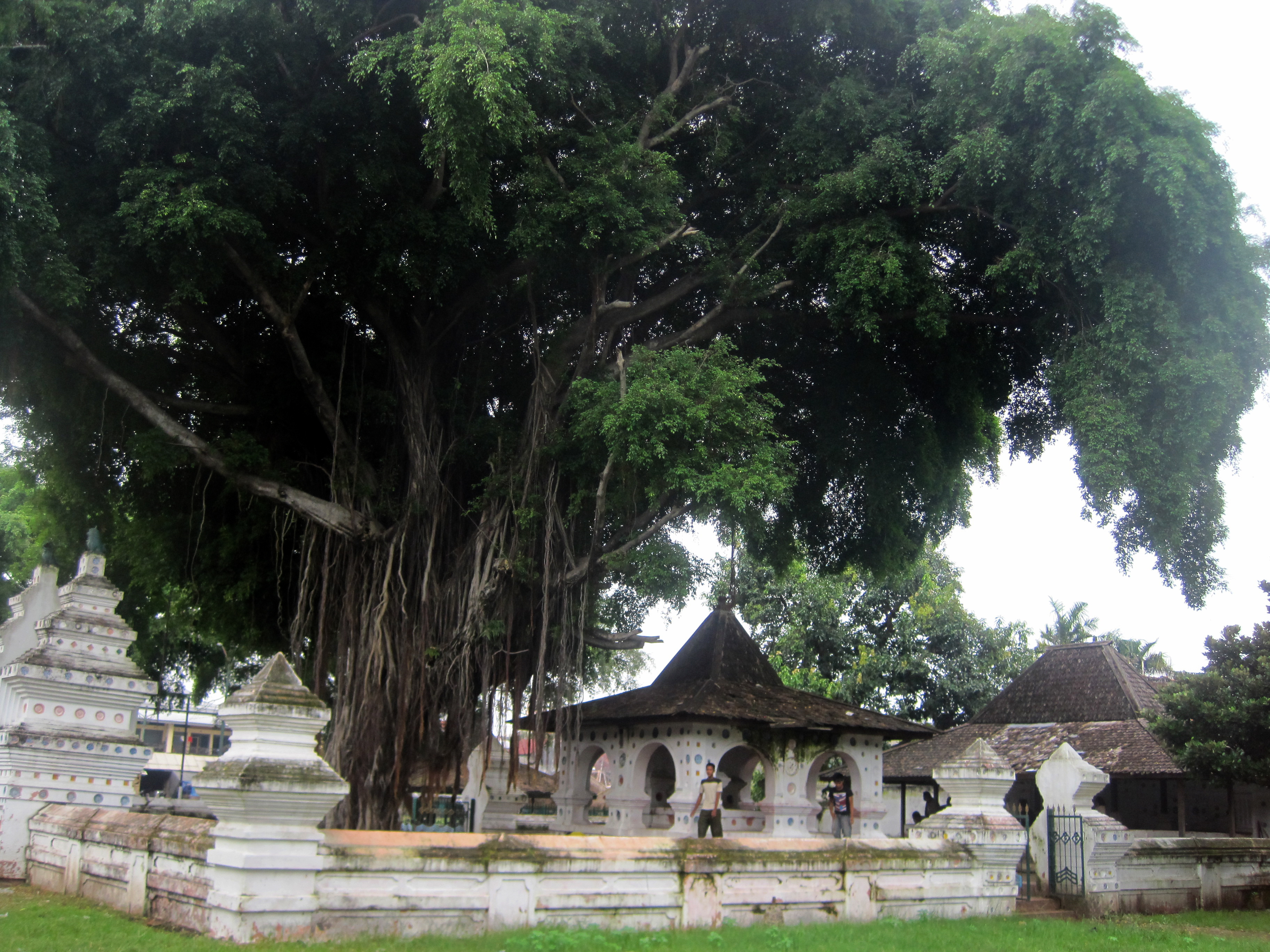
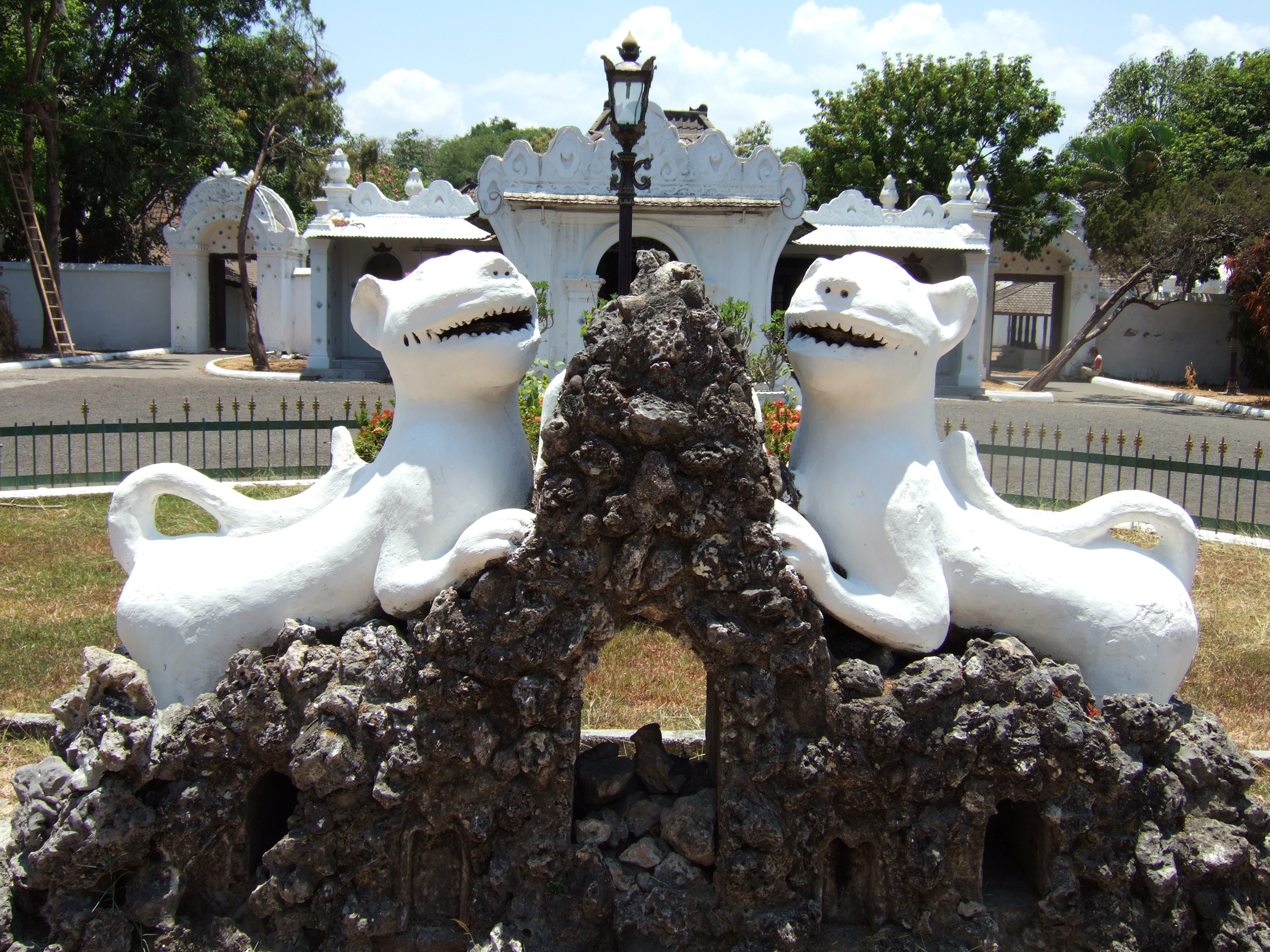
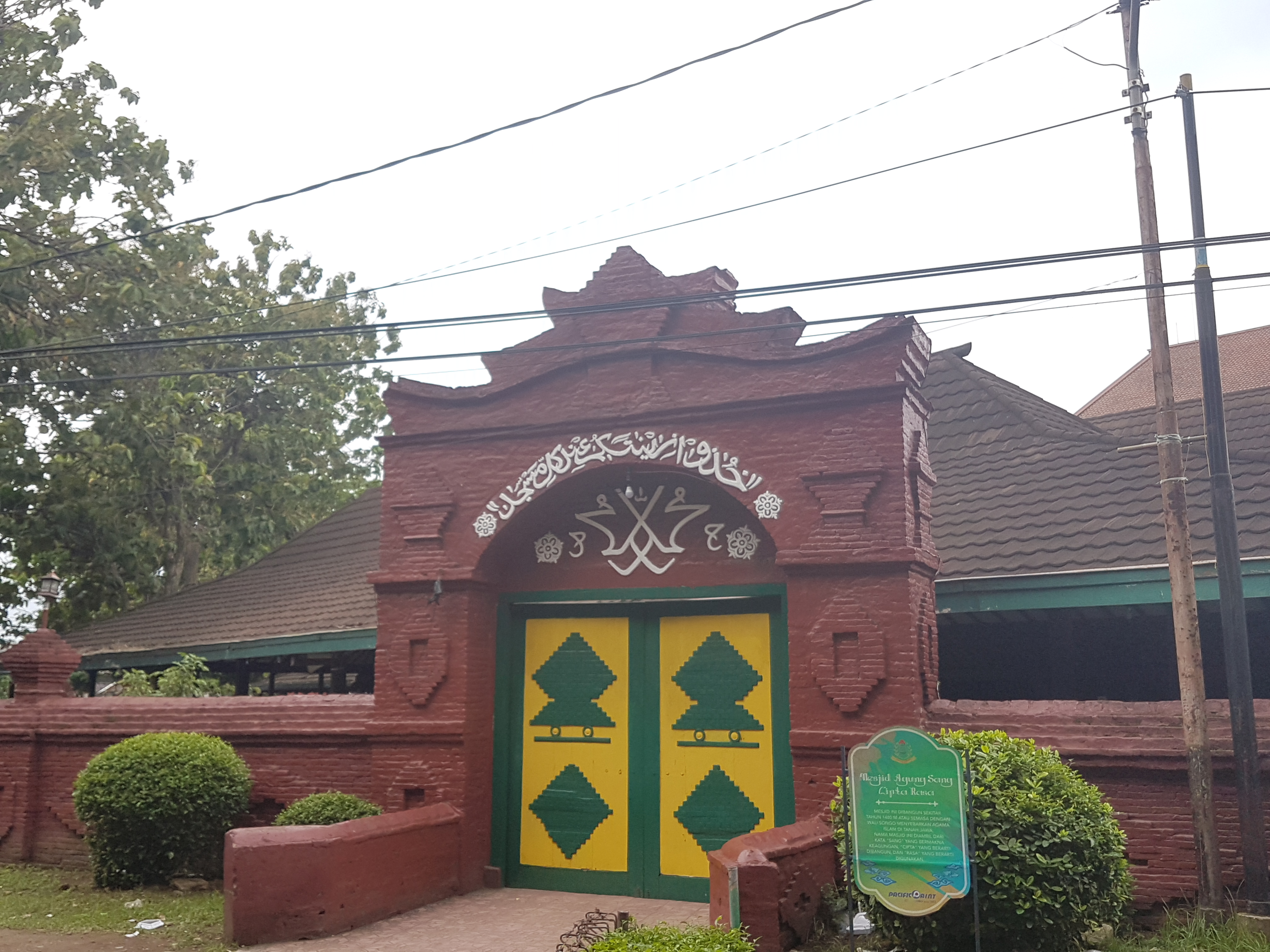
- Cirebon railway station Mausoleum of Sunan Gunungjati Kanoman Palace Keraton Kasepuhan Great Mosque of Cirebon

- Flag Coat of arms
- Nicknames: Kota Udang (City of Shrimps)
- Motto: Gemah, Ripah, Loh Jinawi (Sundanese) ᮌᮨᮙᮃᮂ, ᮛᮤᮕᮃᮂ, ᮜᮧᮂ ᮏᮤᮔᮃᮝᮤ (Prosperous, Peaceful, Abundantly Fertile)
- Location within West Java

- Location in Java and Indonesia Cirebon (Indonesia)
- Coordinates: 6°42′26″S 108°33′27″E
- Country: Indonesia
- Province: West Java
- Incorporated (as gemeente): 1 April 1906

Government
  - Mayor: Effendi Edo
  - Vice Mayor: Siti Farida

Area
  - City: 39.48 km^{2} (15.24 sq mi)
  - Metro: 1,114.64 km^{2} (430.36 sq mi)

Population (mid 2025 estimate)
  - City: 347,537
  - Density: 8,803/km^{2} (22,800/sq mi)
  - Metro: 2,761,351
  - Metro density: 2,477.35/km^{2} (6,416.30/sq mi)
- Time zone: UTC+7 (Indonesia Western Time)
- Area code: (+62) 231
- License plate: E
- Website: cirebonkota.go.id

Cirebon (Indonesian pronunciation: [t͡ʃirə'bɔn], formerly rendered Cheribon or Chirebon in English) is a port city on the northern coast of the Indonesian island of Java. It is the only coastal city of West Java, located about 40 km west of the provincial border with Central Java, approximately 297 km (185 mi) east of Jakarta, at 6°43′S 108°34′E. It had a population of 296,389 at the 2010 census and 333,303 at the 2020 census; the official estimate as of mid 2025 was 347,537 (comprising 174,364 males and 173,173 females).

The built-up area of Cirebon reaches out from the city and into the surrounding regency of the same name; the official metropolitan area encompasses the whole of this regency as well as the city, and covers an area of 1,114.64 km^{2} (430.36 sq mi), with a 2010 census population of 2,363,585; the 2020 census total was 2,603,924 and the official estimate as at mid 2025 was 2,761,351.

Straddling the border between West and Central Java, Cirebon's history has been influenced by both Sundanese and Javanese culture as well as Arab and Chinese, and is the seat of a former Sultanate.

== Etymology ==
Being on the border of the respective Sundanese (i.e., Western Java) and Javanese (i.e., Central Java) cultural regions, many of Cirebon's residents speak a dialect that is a mix of Sundanese and Javanese, known as Jawareh. It is thought that the word "Cirebon" derives from the Javanese word caruban, meaning "mixed": a reference to the city's mix of Sundanese, Javanese, Chinese, and Arabic cultural elements. Alternatively, it could be derived from the Sundanese words "ci" (water or river) and "rebon" ("shrimp"). (Indeed, the main product of the city is fish including shrimp.)

== History ==
The sultanate court lies near the modern-day city of Cirebon on West Java's northern coast. Throughout the 16th and 17th centuries, the sultanate thrived and became an important center in the region for trade, commerce, and Islamic study and dissemination in Java. In 1677, the sultanate split into four royal houses, leaving four kratons (palaces) in Cirebon; Keraton Kasepuhan, Kraton Kanoman, Keraton Kacirebonan, and Keraton Keprabonan. Each has its own lineage and all are the descendants and stewards of the original Cirebon Sultanate.

According to the manuscript Purwaka Caruban Nagari, Cirebon started as a small fishing village in the 15th century named Muara Jati which attracted foreign traders. The port master at that time was Ki Gedeng Alang-Alang, appointed by the king of Galuh kingdom, located inland in Kawali, Ciamis. He later moved the port to Lemahwungkuk, 5 kilometres (3.1 mi) to the south. As the new settlement leader, Ki Gedeng Alang-Alang was bestowed with the title "Kuwu Cerbon" (Cerbon village leader).

A 15th-century prince from Pajajaran, Prince Walangsungsang, converted to Islam and was appointed as the Adipati (Duke) of Cirebon with the title Cakrabumi. He established the new kingdom of Cirebon and declared independence from Sunda and Galuh. The establishment of the Cirebon Sultanate marked the first Islamic rule in western Java, transforming Muara Jati into a busy port. Cirebon was an independent sultanate under the leadership of Sunan Gunungjati in the early 16th century. After the Sunda Kingdom collapsed, the Sultanates of Banten and Mataram fought over control of Cirebon, which declared its allegiance to Sultan Agung of Mataram, whose grandson Amangkurat II ceded the city to the Dutch in 1677. In 1705, a treaty saw the Cirebon area west of Cisanggarung River become a Dutch protectorate jointly administered by three sultans whose courts rivalled those of Central Java. The Dutch authorities later established the Cirebon Residency (Residentie Tjirebon) which was composed of present-day Cirebon, Indramayu, and Kuningan.

The coat of arms of Cirebon during the Dutch colonial era, granted in 1930

During the time of the Dutch "Culture System" a flourishing trade in colonial cash crops attracted many Chinese entrepreneurs and that influence is still evident in the batik for which Cirebon is famous. Cirebon suffered a famine in 1844, apparently triggered by a combination of drought and the shift from subsistence agriculture to cash crops, particularly indigo and sugarcane, enforced by Dutch's Cultivation system.

== Geography ==
=== Climate ===
Cirebon has a tropical monsoon climate (Köppen Am) with moderate to little rainfall from June to October and heavy to very heavy rainfall from November to May.

Climate data for Cirebon
Month	Jan	Feb	Mar	Apr	May	Jun	Jul	Aug	Sep	Oct	Nov	Dec	Year
Mean daily maximum °C (°F)	31.0 (87.8)	30.9 (87.6)	31.5 (88.7)	32.0 (89.6)	32.2 (90.0)	32.3 (90.1)	32.3 (90.1)	32.9 (91.2)	33.6 (92.5)	33.8 (92.8)	32.9 (91.2)	31.9 (89.4)	32.3 (90.1)
Daily mean °C (°F)	26.8 (80.2)	26.7 (80.1)	27.2 (81.0)	27.5 (81.5)	27.5 (81.5)	27.3 (81.1)	27.2 (81.0)	27.4 (81.3)	27.9 (82.2)	28.1 (82.6)	27.9 (82.2)	27.3 (81.1)	27.4 (81.3)
Mean daily minimum °C (°F)	22.7 (72.9)	22.6 (72.7)	22.9 (73.2)	23.0 (73.4)	22.9 (73.2)	22.4 (72.3)	22.2 (72.0)	22.0 (71.6)	22.2 (72.0)	22.5 (72.5)	22.9 (73.2)	22.8 (73.0)	22.6 (72.7)
Average rainfall mm (inches)	484 (19.1)	402 (15.8)	377 (14.8)	193 (7.6)	144 (5.7)	77 (3.0)	55 (2.2)	42 (1.7)	26 (1.0)	62 (2.4)	198 (7.8)	333 (13.1)	2,393 (94.2)
Source: Climate-Data.org

=== Administrative divisions ===
The city of Cirebon is divided into five administrative districts (kecamatan), listed below with their areas and their populations at the 2011 census and the 2020 census, together with the official estimates as at mid 2025. The table also includes the locations of the district administrative centres and the number of administrative villages in each district (all classed as urban kelurahan).

Kode Wilayah	Name of District (kecamatan)	Area in km^{2}	Pop'n (2010 census)	Pop'n (2020 census)	Pop'n mid 2025 estimate	Pop'n density 2025 (per km^{2})	Admin centre	No. of villages
32.74.01	Kejaksan	4.45	42,300	45,966	47,091	10,582	Kesenden	4
32.74.02	Lemahwungkuk	7.16	52,811	57,503	58,968	8,236	Pegambiran	4
32.74.03	Harjamukti	17.62	102,158	123,089	132,563	7,523	Kalijaga	5
32.74.04	Pekalipan	1.59	28,927	29,742	29,665	18,657	Pekalipan	4
32.74.05	Kesambi	8.66	70,193	77,003	79,250	9,151	Kesambi	5
	Totals	39.48	296,389	333,303	347,537	8,803	Kejaksan	22

The five districts are sub-divided into twenty-two urban villages (kelurahan) which are listed below with their populations at the 2010 census and the 2020 census, together with their post codes:

Kode; Wilayah	District (kecamatan)	Village (kelurahan)	Pop'n 2010 census	Pop'n 2020 census	Post code
32.74.01.1001	Kejaksan	Kejaksan	8,959	9,086	45123
32.74.01.1002	Kejaksan	Sukapura	13,341	14,502	45122
32.74.01.1003	Kejaksan	Kesenden	11,875	13,475	45121
32.74.01.1004	Kejaksan	Kebonbaru	8,125	8,823	45121
32.74.03.1001	Harjamukti	Kalijaga	29,550	36,627	45154
32.74.03.1002	Harjamukti	Harjamukti	18,725	21,936	45153
32.74.03.1003	Harjamukti	Kecapi	22,222	23,981	45152
32.74.03.1004	Harjamukti	Larangan	14,364	16,111	45151
32.74.03.1005	Harjamukti	Argasunya	17,297	24,434	45155
32.74.04.1001	Pekalipan	Jagasutra	9,704	10,004	45115
32.74.04.1002	Pekalipan	Pekalipan	6,195	6,211	45117
32.74.04.1003	Pekalipan	Pulasaren	7,313	7,598	45116
32.74.04.1004	Pekalipan	Pekalangan	5,715	5,929	45118
32.74.05.1001	Kesambi	Pekiringan	11,198	11,901	45131
32.74.05.1002	Kesambi	Sunyaragi	10,779	12,342	45132
32.74.05.1003	Kesambi	Kesambi	9,291	8,690	45134
32.74.05.1004	Kesambi	Drajat	15,100	15,737	45133
32.74.05.1005	Kesambi	Karyamulya	23,825	28,333	45131

== Demographics ==
The city's population was 296,389 at the Indonesia census of 2010. The official estimate as at mid 2025 was 347,537. As with other coastal cities in Indonesia, a large population of ethnic Chinese has flocked into the city as a result of long-term Chinese immigration since the 17th century. Other communities include Malays, Koreans, Arabs, Indians, Japanese. Significant suburbs lie within densely populated Cirebon Regency, and the official metropolitan area encompasses this entire regency as well as the city.

Administrative division	Area (km^{2})	Pop'n (2010 census)	Pop'n (2015 census)	Pop'n (2020 census)	Pop'n mid 2025 estimate	Pop'n density 2025 (per km^{2})
Cirebon City	39.48	296,389	307,319	333,303	347,537	8,803
Cirebon Regency	1,075.16	2,067,196	2,124,866	2,270,621	2,413,814	2,248
Greater Cirebon	1,114.64	2,363,585	2,432,185	2,603,924	2,761,351	2,477

Although surrounded by Sundanese-speaking areas in West Java, linguists have stated that Cirebon (and the historically related region of Serang city in Banten Province) are inside its own Cirebonese language area. In addition, this is supported by a large portion of the Cirebon people referring to themselves as "Wong Cirebon" ("Cirebonese people"), and to their language as "Basa Cirebon" ("Cirebonese"). Cirebonese language is related to Javanese and Banyumasan with dialects such as the Jawareh (half-Javanese half Sundanese), Plered, and Dermayon. There are also native Sundanese speakers in the city, who speak a local dialect known as Bahasa Sunda Cirebon (Cirebonese Sundanese language) which contains unique words not found in its Priangan counterpart.

== Campaign for Cirebon Province ==
In the modern era, some of the local political elite in Cirebon and surrounding regencies have campaigned for Cirebon city, together with the regencies of Cirebon, Indramayu, Kuningan and Majalengka to be established as a new province (Provinsi Rebana) - in the same way as Banten Province was formed in 2000 by splitting it away from West Java. To be a new province it is required that it should be proposed by at least five regencies. Leaders from four of these administrations have given their consent, but Majalengka Regency has turned down the idea and indicated that it would prefer to stay part of West Java. However, the lack of support from the Majalengka area does not preclude Cirebon city and the other three regencies from continuing to promote the idea.

The potential size and population of this possible Province would be as follows:

Name	Capital	Area in km^{2}	Pop'n 2010 census	Pop'n 2020 census	Pop'n mid 2025 estimate
Cirebon City	Cirebon	39.48	296,389	333,303	347,587
Cirebon Regency	Sumber	1,075.16	2,067,196	2,270,621	2,413,814
Indramayu Regency	Indramayu	2,078.03	1,663,737	1,834,434	1,950,316
Kuningan Regency	Kuningan	1,194.09	1,035,589	1,167,686	1,225,493
Majalengka Regency	Majalengka	1,204.24	1,166,473	1,305,476	1,374,601
Totals		5,591.00	6,229,384	6,911,520	7,311,811

== Economy ==
Cirebon City's economy is influenced by its strategic geographical location and by the characteristics of natural resources. Thus, the structure of its economy is dominated by manufacturing, trade, hotels and restaurants, transport and communications, and service sectors. Tomé Pires in the Suma Oriental around the year 1513 mentioned Cirebon was one of the trade centers on the island of Java. After Cirebon was taken over by the Dutch East Indies government in 1859, it was designated as a transit port for import-export goods and as a communications route to the political control center for the region in the interior of Java.

Until 2001, the economic contribution to the City of Cirebon was characterized by processing industry (41.32%), followed by trade, hotels and restaurants (29.8%), transport and communications sector (13.56%), and services sector (6.06%). Other sectors (9.26%) included mining, agriculture, construction, electricity, and gas. Aside from fishery, its harbor, Tanjung Emas, on the Java Sea has been a major hub for timber from Borneo.

== Culture ==
Cirebon itself is known as Grage in the Cirebon dialect of Javanese language, which came from the words "Negara Gede", meaning "Great Kingdom." As a port city, Cirebon attracts visitors and settlers from elsewhere in Indonesia and from other nations as well. Cirebon culture was described as Java Pasisiran (coastal) culture, similar to the cultures of Banten, Pekalongan, and Semarang, with notable mixtures of Sundanese, Chinese, Arabic-Islamic, and European influences.

=== Arts and crafts ===
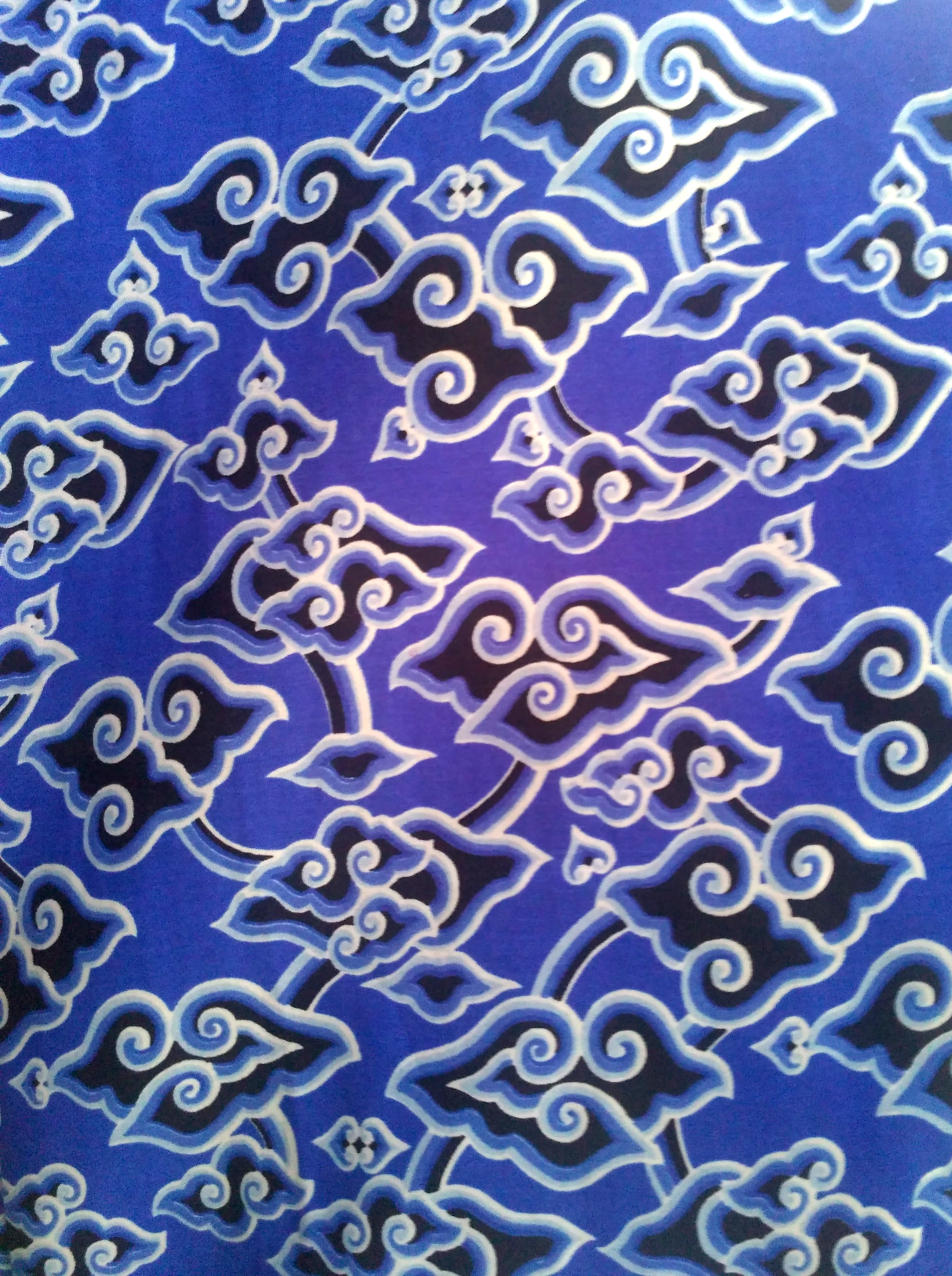
A Megamendung batik motif from Cirebon.

Batik textiles from Cirebon, especially Cirebon batik with vivid colors with motifs and patterns, that demonstrate Chinese and local influences, are well known. Chinese influences can be seen in Cirebon's culture, most notably the Cirebon batik Megamendung pattern that resembles Chinese cloud imagery. The Trusmi area is the production center of Cirebon batik. Cirebon Glass Painting is another aspect of Cirebon arts and crafts. The imagery in glass painting is usually derived from wayang theme to Islamic calligraphy.

=== Performing arts ===
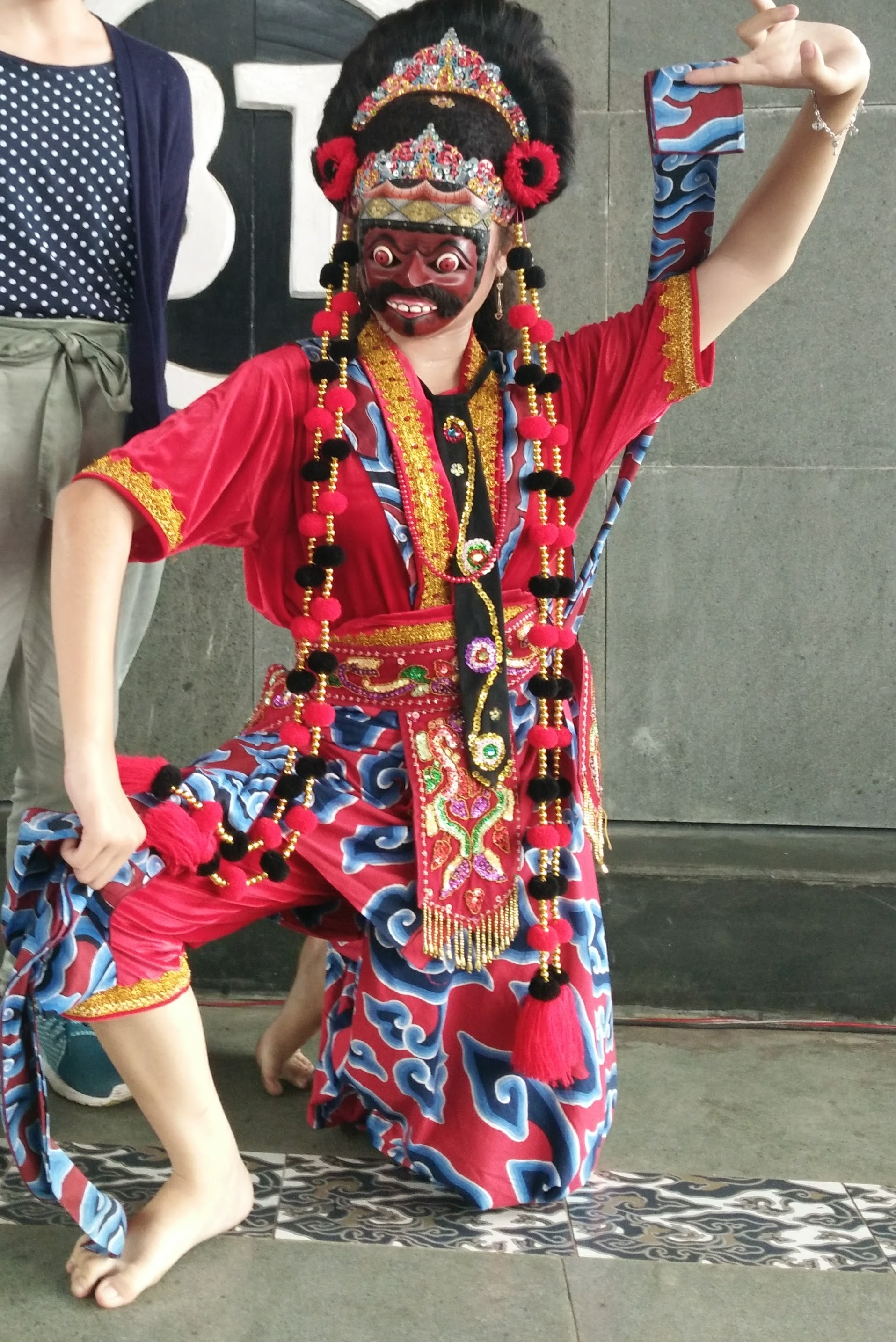
Cirebon mask dance

The Tari Topeng Cirebon, or Cirebon mask dance, is a dance style peculiar to the city. Topeng Cirebon mask dance, inspired by Javanese Panji cycles is one of notable Cirebon traditional dance and quite famous within Indonesian dances.

Cirebon culture is also influenced by Islamic Middle Eastern culture, such as the Burokan tradition where people exhibit the image of buraq — traditionally made from the bamboo frame and paper skin, or other materials — in processions around the village accompanied with music. The traditions of the bamboo statues borne in these processions are similar to Sundanese Sisingaan, Betawi Ondel-ondel, or Balinese Ogoh-ogoh processions, yet differ in their Islamic theme. Burokan are usually held during festive occasions such as circumcision or marriage, and are accompanied by popular Cirebon folk songs, such as tarling.

Tarling is a musical tradition reminiscent of Bandung's kecapi suling music with except that it features guitar, suling (bamboo flute) and voice. The name derived from gitar (guitar), and suling (flute).

=== Sports ===
Cirebon is the home town of the PSGJ Cirebon football team, the club plays in the Liga Nusantara. Another team, Cirebon Football Club, team also plays in the Liga Nusantara is based in the Bima stadium Cirebon. Other popular sports in Cirebon include Futsal.

=== Court culture ===
The four remaining palaces (kraton) of the Sultanate of Cirebon are Kraton Kasepuhan (built 1447), Kraton Kanoman (built 1678), Kraton Kaprabonan (built 1696) and Kraton Kacirebonan (built 1808), all run as cultural institutions to preserve Cirebonese culture. Each kraton still holds their own traditional ceremonies and have become the patrons of Cirebonese arts.

The flag of the former Cirebon Sultanate is called Macan Ali ("Panther of Ali"), with Arabic calligraphy arranged to resemble a panther or tiger; this indicates Islamic influence, and is also a reference to the tiger banner of the Sundanese Hindu King Siliwangi of Pakuan Pajajaran. The royal lineage of Cirebon is still well-respected and held in high prestige among the people of Cirebon, although it no longer holds any political power.

The royal carriage of Kasepuhan's Singa Barong and Kanoman's Paksi Naga Liman carriage both resemble the chimera of three animals: eagle, elephant, and dragon. These symbolize Indian Hinduism, Arab Islam, and Chinese influences. The images of Macan Ali, Singa Barong, and Paksi Naga Liman are common motifs in Cirebonese batik.

=== Cuisine ===
As a coastal city, Cirebon's main industry is fishery. Its products include terasi (shrimp paste), petis, krupuk udang (shrimp crackers) and various salted fish. Cirebon is famous for its high quality salted fish, such as jambal roti, juhi (salted cuttlefish), rebon, and ebi (dried small shrimp). These products are often sought by visitors, especially Indonesian domestic tourists and visitors from other cities, as oleh-oleh (food souvenirs).

Cirebon is also known for its local cuisines and delicacies, such as empal gentong (offal curry), mie koclok (chicken noodle soup with coconut milk), nasi lengko (rice with bean sprouts, fried tofu, and fried tempeh, topped with peanut sauce and soy sauce), nasi jamblang (rice of various side dishes), tahu gejrot (fried tofu with ground garlic, chili, and shallot, topped with thin and sweet soy sauce), tahu petis (dry fried tofu served with petis dip sauce), tahu tek-tek (fried tofu topped with peanut sauce and mixed with vegetables), ayam panggang (barbecued chicken), and docang (lontong with sour vegetable soup).

== Tourism ==
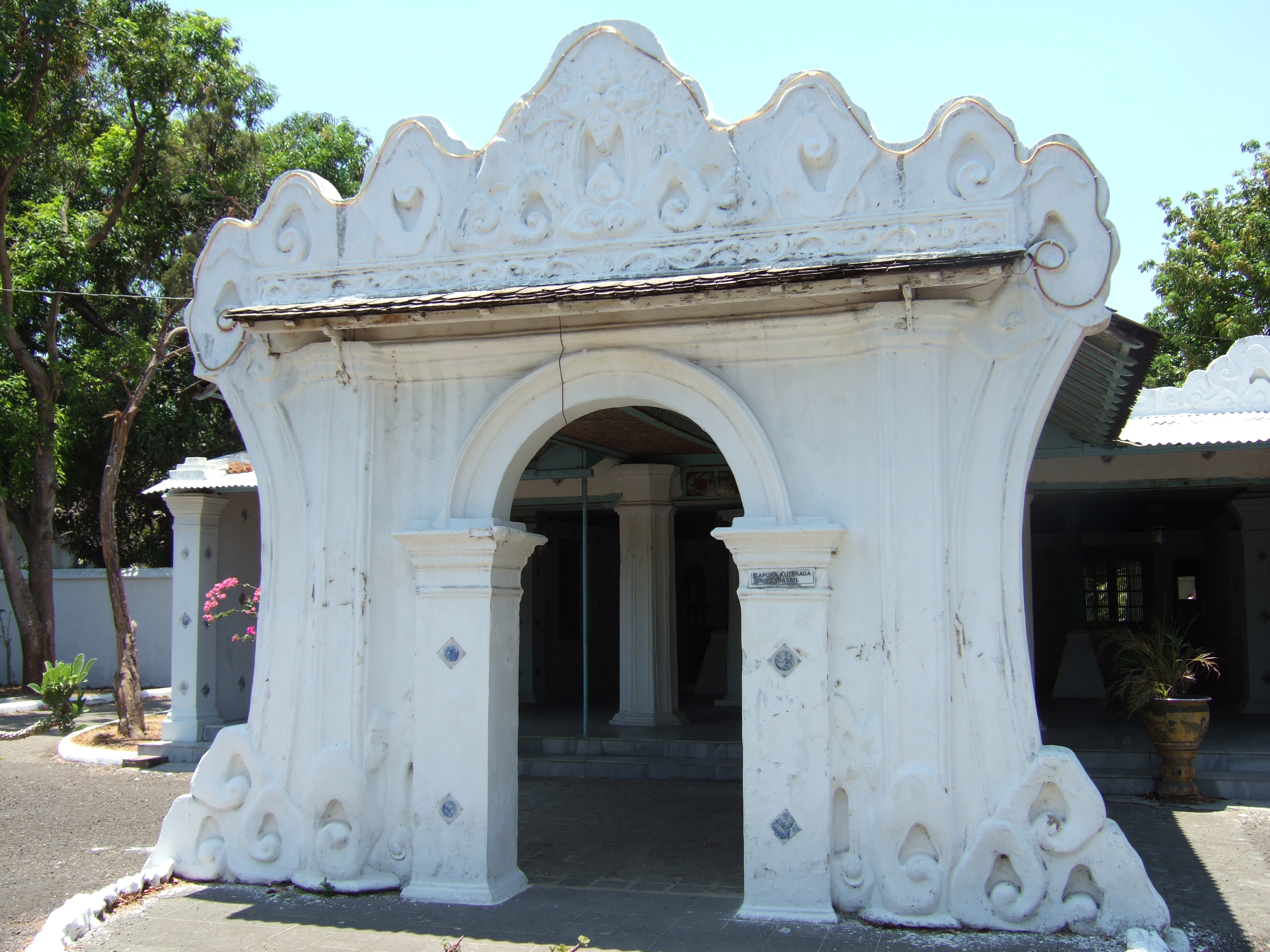
Gate at Keraton Kasepuhan

As one tourist destination in West Java, Cirebon City offers many attractions ranging from a historical tour of the glory of Islam, the story of the trustees, Complex Sunan Gunung Jati in Mount Sembung about 24 kilometres (15 mi) to the west of the city center, Great Mosque of Cirebon, At-Taqwa Mosque, temple ancient buildings and relics of Netherlands.

Cirebon is a palace at the same time in the city, namely Keraton Kasepuhan and Kanoman. Everything has architecture a combination of elements culture Islam, China, and Netherlands. Characteristics of the palace buildings are always facing north and there is a mosque nearby. Each palace has square as a gathering place, market and sculpture tiger in park or page forward as a symbol of King Siliwangi, the central character formation Sultanate of Cirebon. Another feature is the plate porcelain original China are so trimmer wall. Some dishes supposedly derived from Europe when Cirebon so port trade center island Java.

Cirebon city park has some of them Waterpark Sunyaragi and Park of Ade Irma Suryani. Water Parks Sunyaragi has technology flow water advanced in his time, the water flows between the terraces where the princess king preening, page grass green where the knight practice, plus tower and room privileged that door was made of curtain water.

=== Orientation and places ===
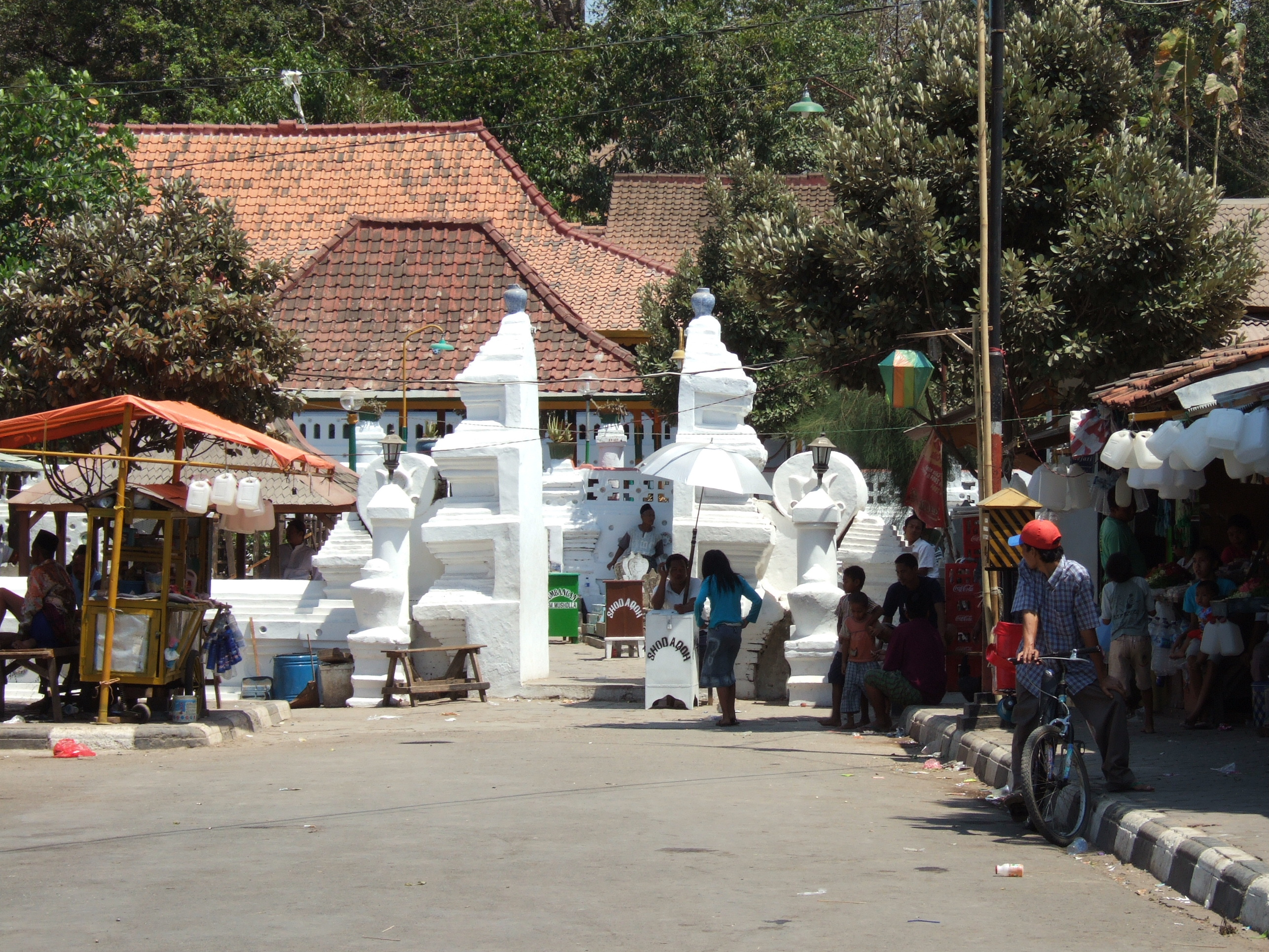
Entrance to the tomb of Sunan Gunung Jati.

The main boulevard is Jalan Siliwangi. It runs from the train station to the canal via the Pasar Pagi ("Morning Market"). Then the street becomes Jalan Karanggetas along which are most of Cirebon's banks, restaurants, and hotels. There are a number of historic buildings and other key sites in Cirebon, some of them in an advanced state of decay. These include the buildings of the several kratons, the Sang Cipta Rasa Grand Mosque, and the Gua Sunyaragi Park.

Wali Songo, especially Sunan Gunung Jati, is known to have influenced the city's history. Sunan Gunung Jati's grave is located several kilometers outside the city in the Gunung Jati district. There are two temples and a cave system built by two Chinese architects around the 1880s, decorated by Chinese and Western porcelain. The village of Trusmi, about five kilometers outside of Cirebon, has been noted for batik production. Plangon is a habitat of monkeys.

Mt Ceremai, the highest peak in West Java, is a large volcano situated about 40 km (25 mi) to the south of Cirebon. Parks and other tourist spots on the slopes of Mt Ceremai are popular places for groups from Cirebon to visit during weekends to escape from the hotter climate on the coast. The village of Linggajati, near the town of Cilimus, (where the Linggadjati Agreement was signed) is one such place. Public transportation brings tourists and visitors here.

=== Cityscape ===
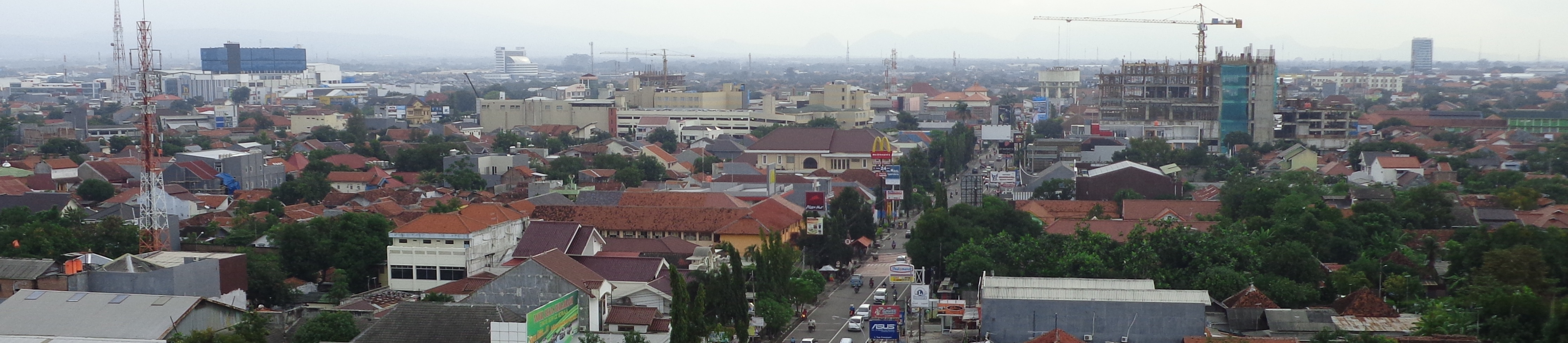
Cirebon Skyline

== Transportation ==
=== Airport ===
Cirebon residents are now using Kertajati International Airport, serving the Greater Cirebon metropolitan and surrounding area.

Cakrabhuwana Airport in Penggung, Harjamukti subdistrict also serves the TNI-AU. The city lies on Jalur Pantura (Pantai Utara Jawa), a major road on the northern coast of Java that stretches from Anyer, passes through Jakarta, and ends at Surabaya.

=== Port of Cirebon ===
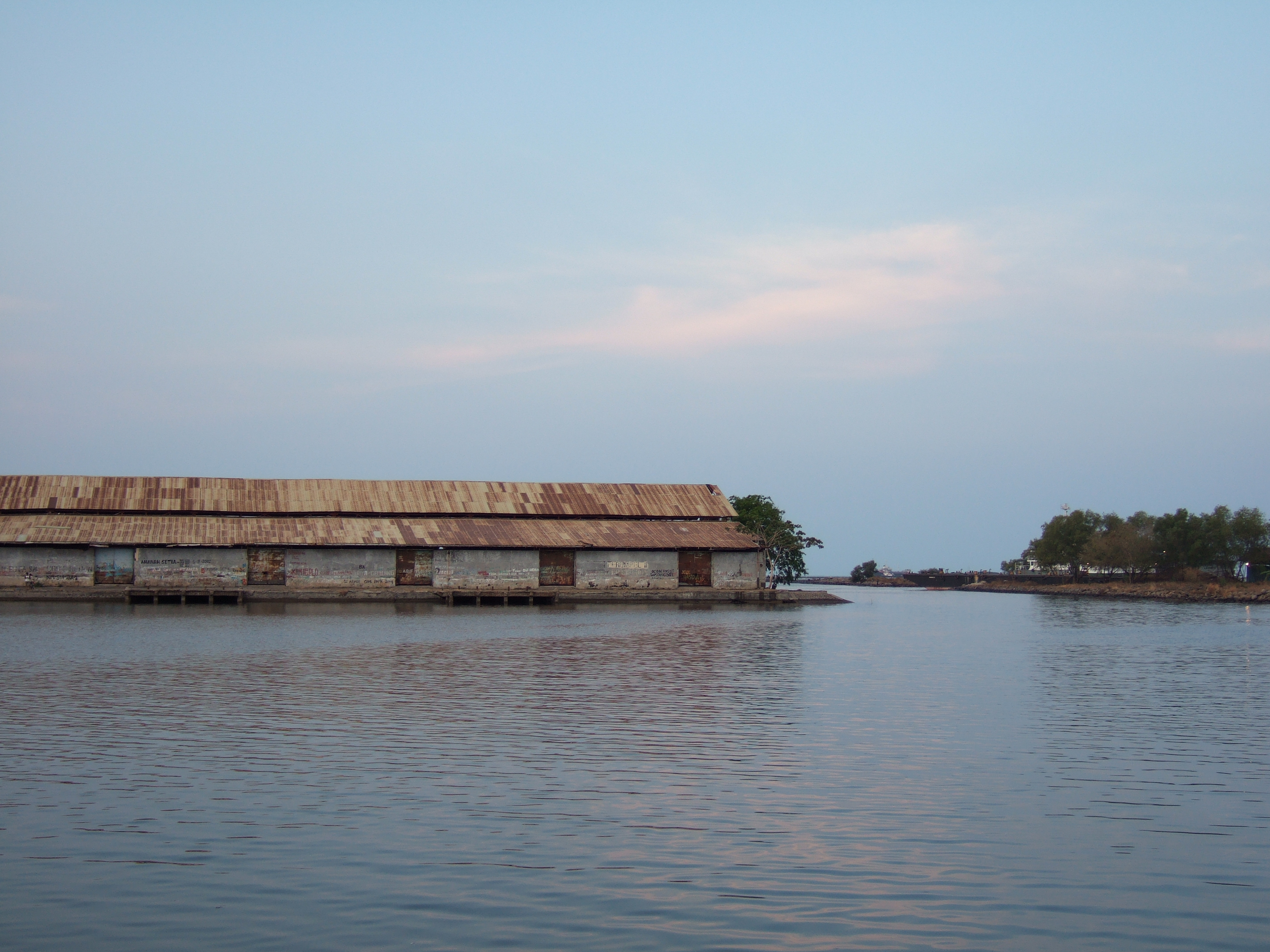
Port of Cirebon.

The Port of Cirebon was established by the Dutch in 1865, principally as an export point for spices, sugar cane, and raw materials from West Java. Warehouses and open storage areas were developed by 1890, and a British American Tobacco cigarette factory was built in the early 20th century.

Port activity is dominated by bulk imports of coal, liquid asphalt and vegetable oils for the West Java hinterland. Until 2002, the port also catered for minor container trade and cruise shipping. In 2006 the port handled 3.27 million metric tons (MT) of trade, more than 90 percent as imports from other Indonesian ports.

== Public service ==
Nearly 93% of the population has been underserved by service water from PDAM Cirebon, the majority of customers in the city's water supply to households (90.37% or as many as 59,006) of the total number of existing connections (65,287).

== Health ==
Since the Dutch East Indies government, Cirebon City has had a hospital named Orange, which unveiled its use on August 31, 1921, and commenced operations from September 1, 1921. Currently the name of Orange Hospital become Gunung Jati Hospital.

In 2009 in the city of Cirebon has been available about 6 general hospitals, four maternity hospitals, 21 health centers, 15 health centers Maid, 20 Mobile Health Center, and 81 Pharmacies and Drug Stores 31. With the number of medical personnel such as specialist doctors about 94 people, and 116 general practitioners, 37 dentists, 847 nurses, and 278 midwives.

== Gallery ==
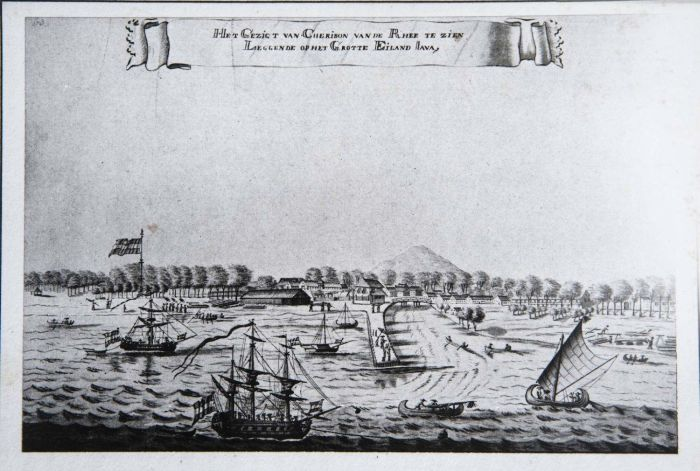
The port of Cirebon in the 17th century

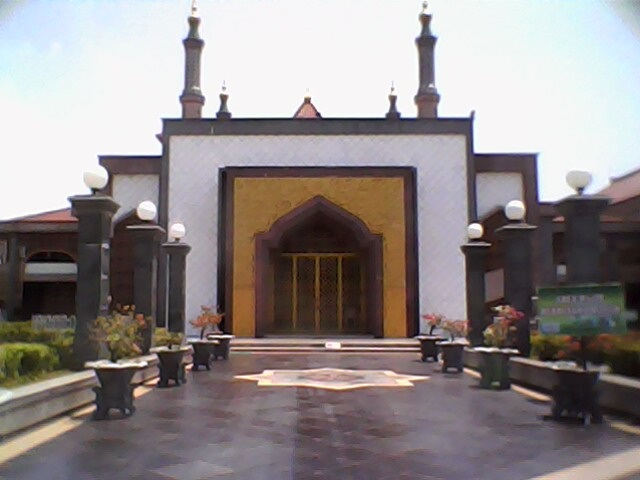
At-Taqwa Mosque

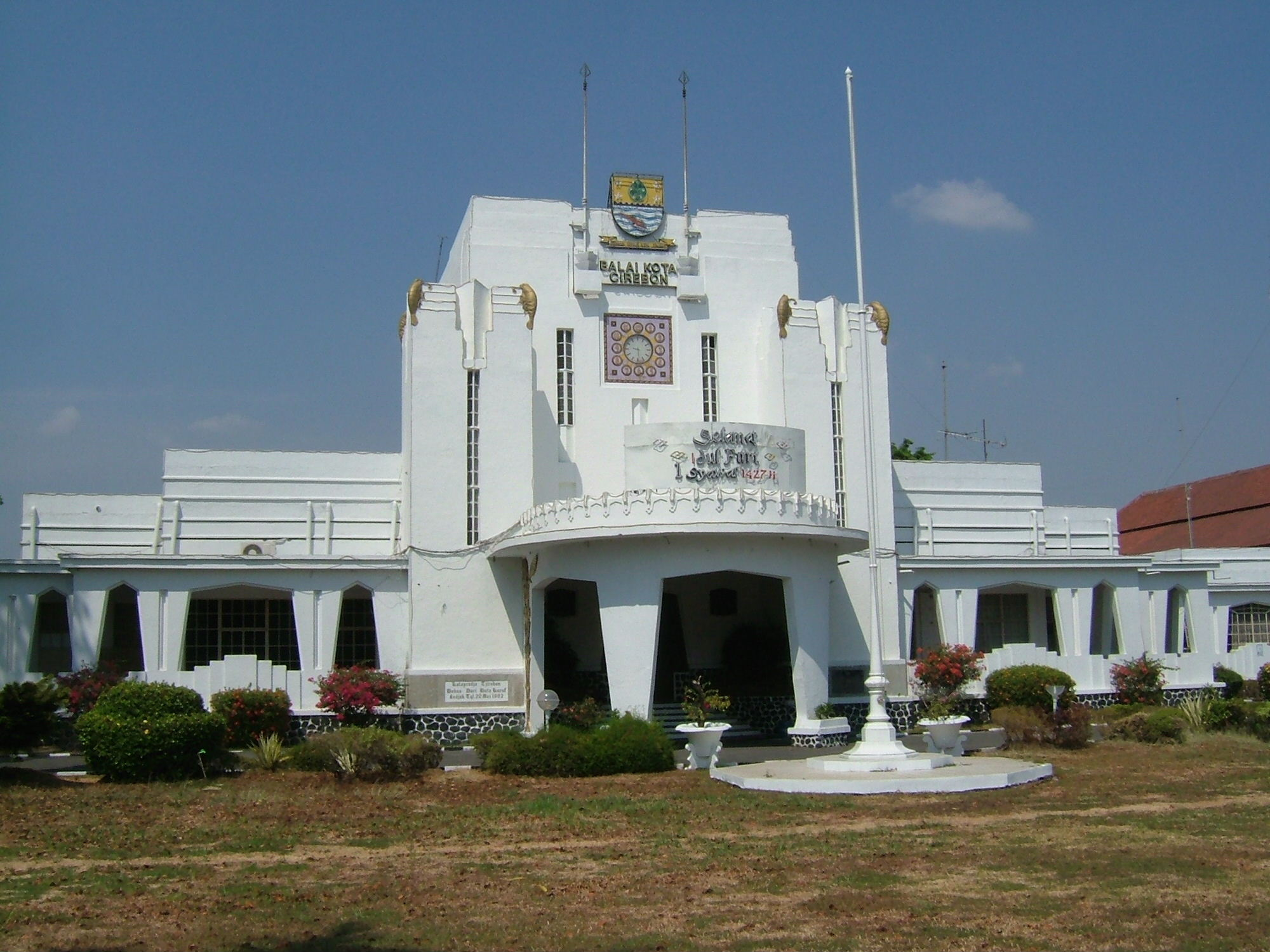
The main building of the Cirebon City Hall

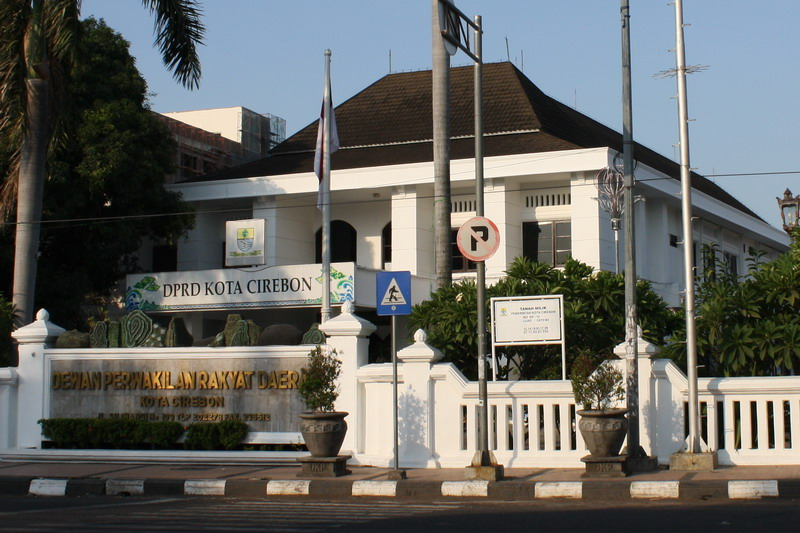
The building of Cirebon City Legislatures (DPRD)

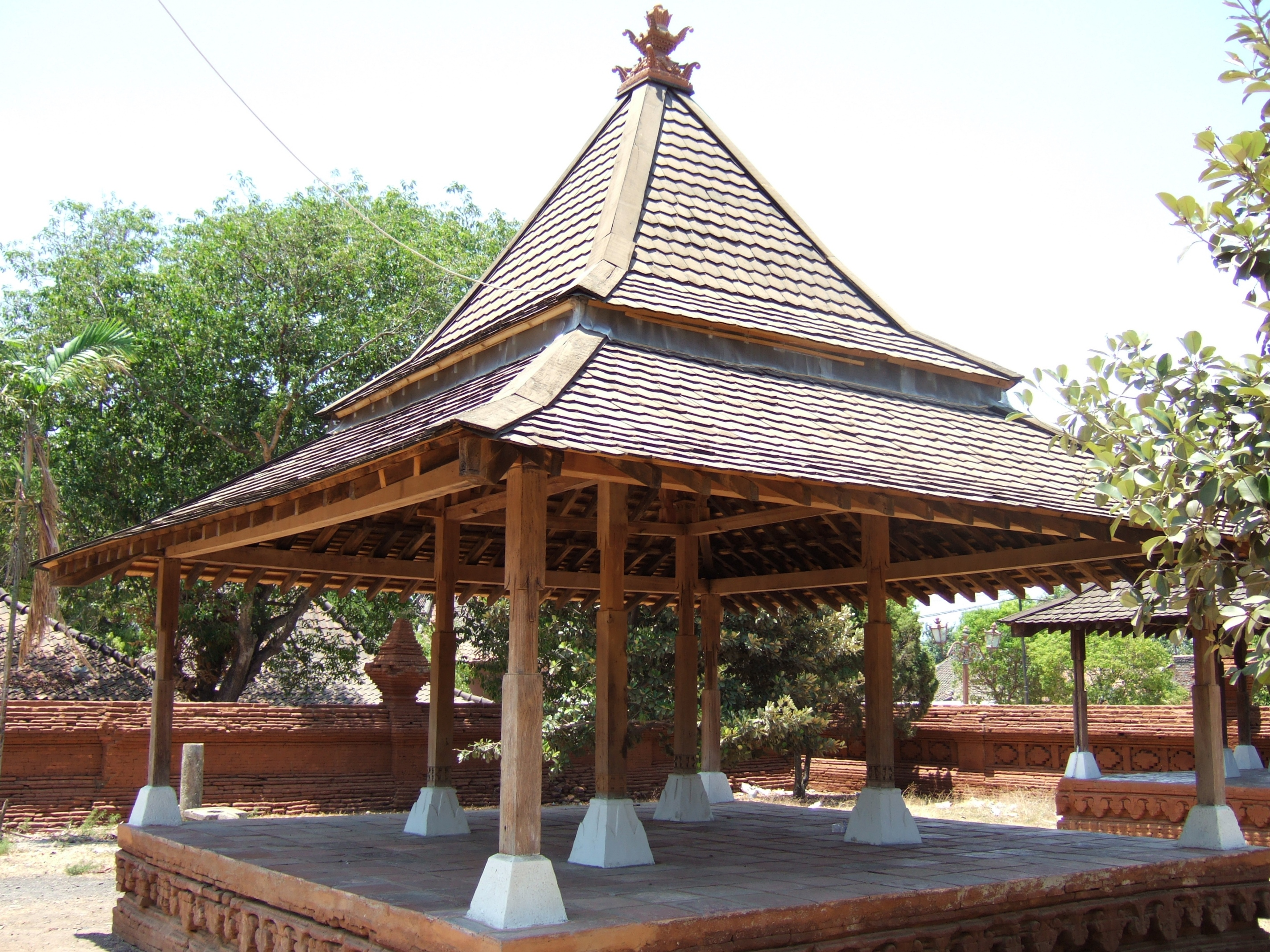
Building inside Keraton Kasepuhan complex

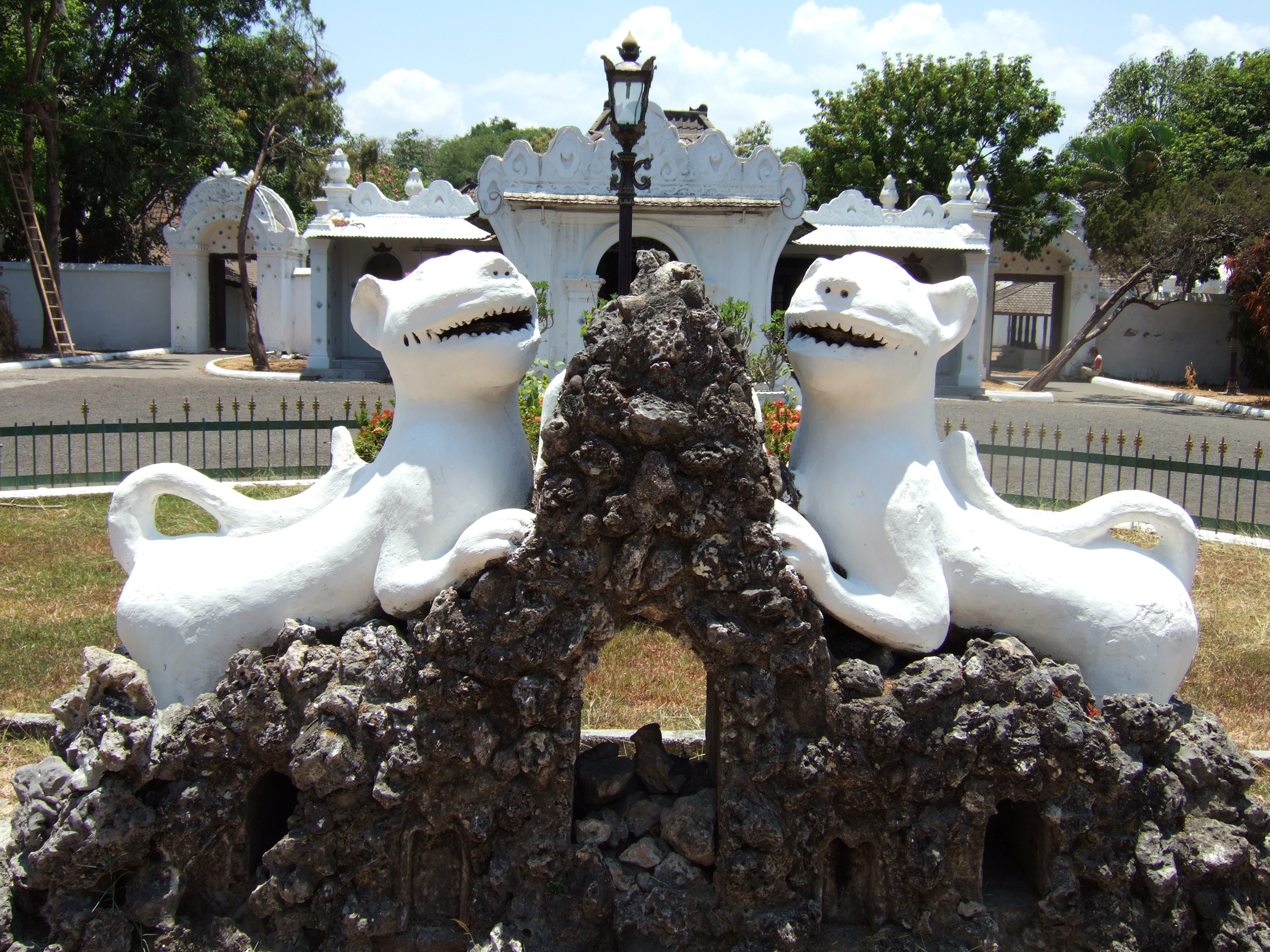
Sculpture in Keraton Kasepuhan

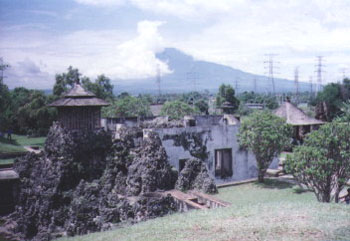
Sunyaragi meditation caves

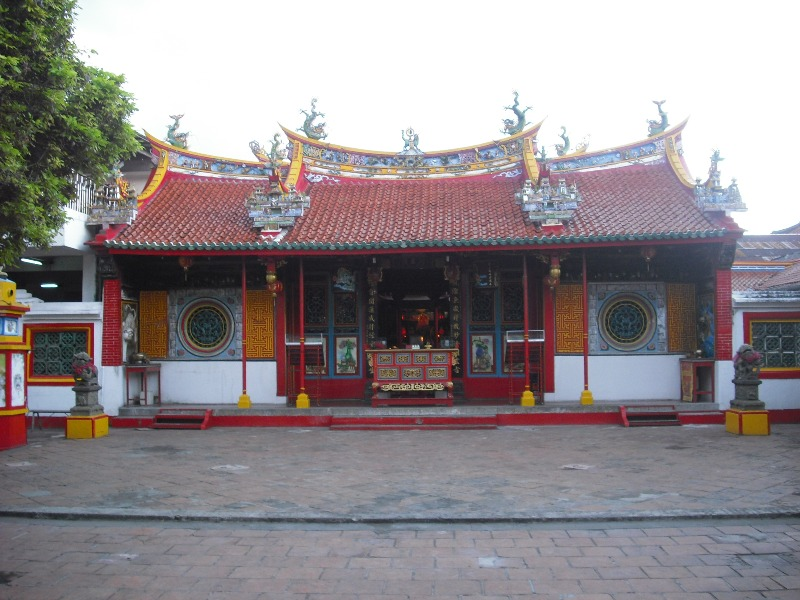
Guanyin Temple in Cirebon

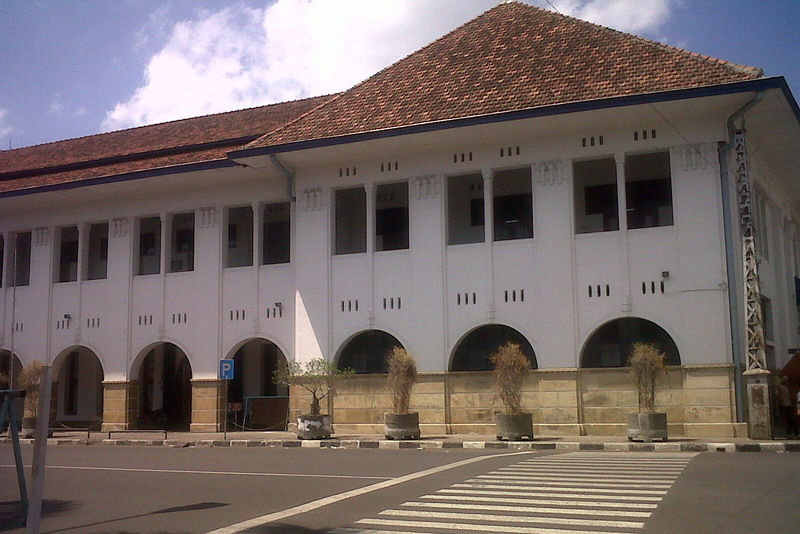
Former building of the British-American-Tobacco

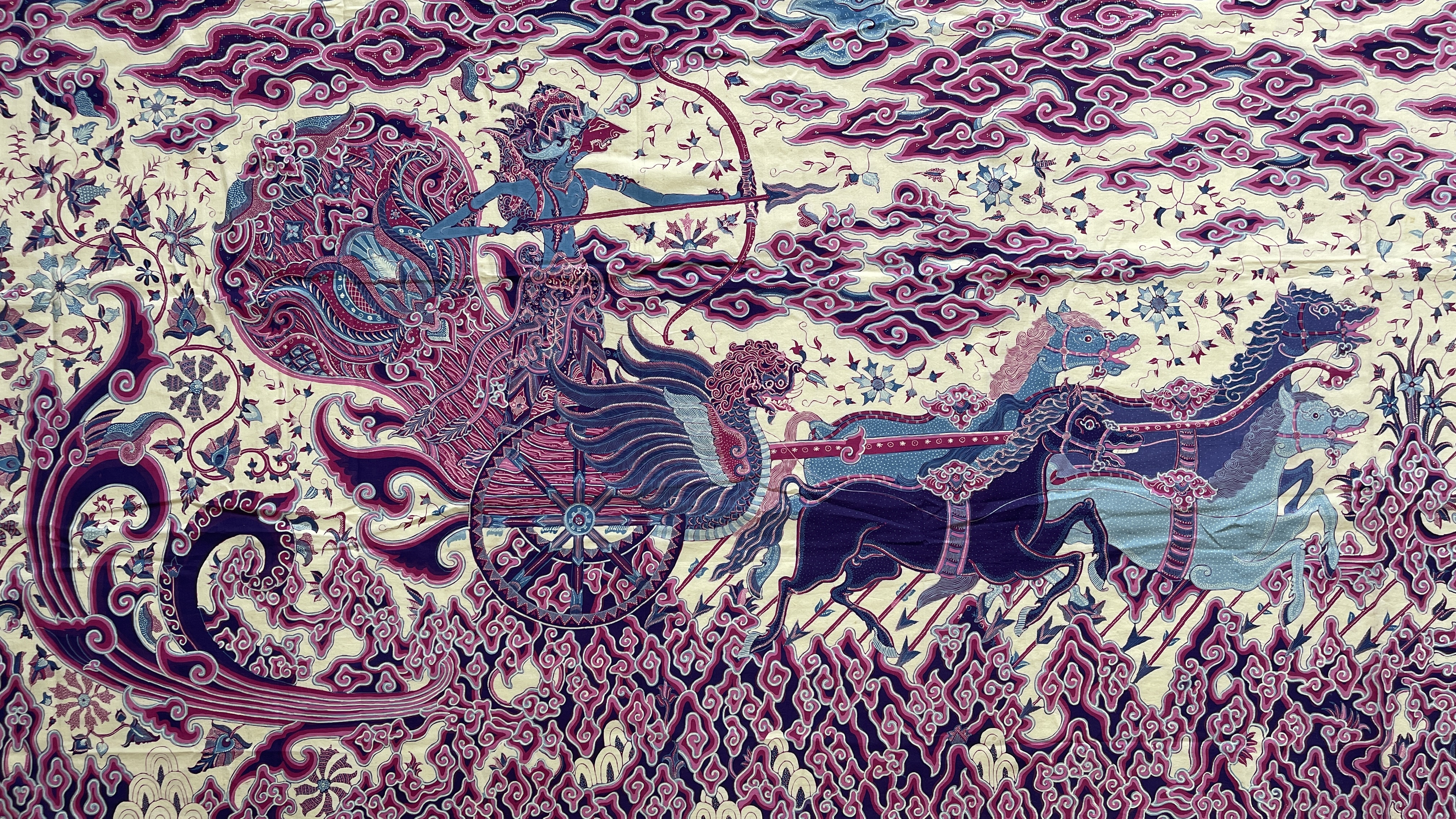
Cirebonese Batik Art depicting Hindu Gods Arjuna and Krishna in their chariot in Mahabharata

== See also ==
- List of cities in Indonesia
