= Cipunagara River =

River in Java, Indonesia

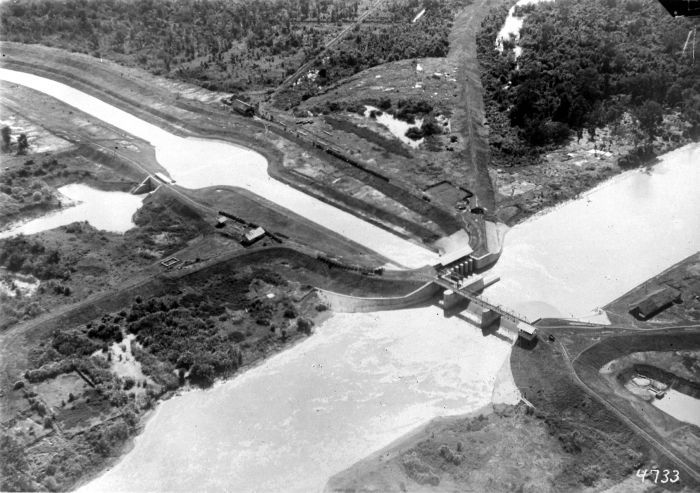
- The Cipunagara River dam, utilized for irrigation in the agricultural areas around Subang and Indramayu.
- Cipunagara river mouth

Location
- Country: Indonesia
- Province: West Java

Physical characteristics
- 2nd source: Bukit Tunggul
  - location: Subang
  - coordinates: 6.808000°S 107.727583°E
  - elevation: 2,100 metres (6,900 ft)
- Mouth: Java Sea
  - location: Pusakanagara
  - coordinates: 6.191361°S 107.890722°E
- Length: 147 km (91 mi)
- Basin size: 1,360 km^{2} (530 mi^{2})

Basin features
- River system: Cipunagara basin
- Waterbodies: Sadawarna dam

Cipunagara is a prominent river located in the Subang Regency of West Java, Indonesia. With a length of 147 kilometers, it traverses the region from its source in the Bukit Tunggul mountains, situated to the south of Subang Regency, the river flows in a south-to-north direction, making its way from the southern hills of Subang through various landscapes, ultimately reaching its estuary in Pusakanagara, where it meets the Java Sea.
