= Great Mosque of Cirebon =

Mosque in Cirebon, West Java, Indonesia

- Masjid Agung Cirebon
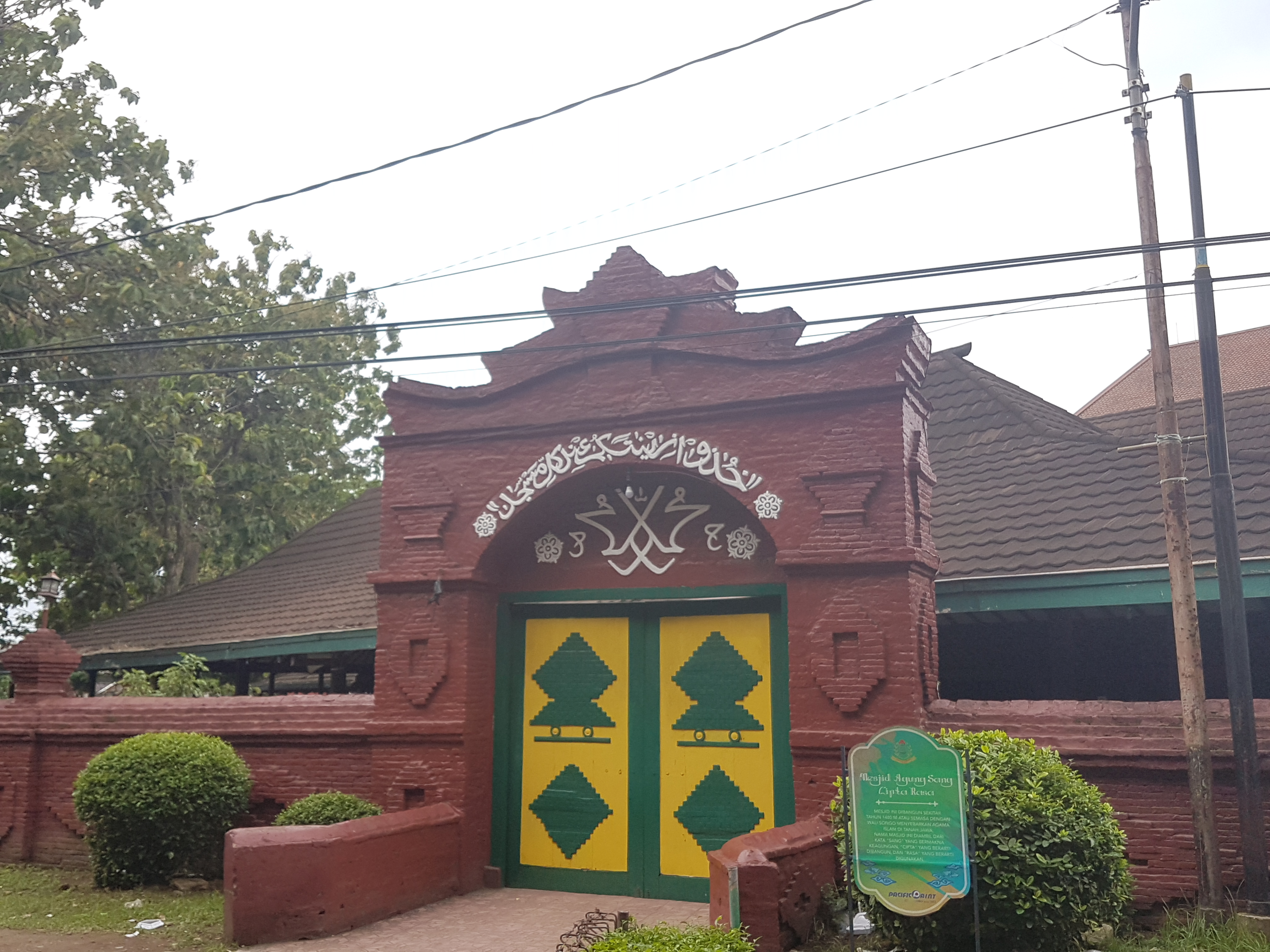

- Indonesia

Religion
- Affiliation: Islam
- Branch/tradition: Sunni

Location
- Location: Cirebon, West Java, Indonesia
- Interactive map of Great Mosque of Cirebon
- Coordinates: 6°43′32.0″S 108°34′12.2″E

Architecture
- Type: Mosque
- Established: 1489

The Great Mosque of Cirebon (Indonesian: Masjid Agung Cirebon), officially known as Masjid Agung Sang Cipta Rasa, is one of the oldest mosques in Indonesia. The mosque is located on the west side of the field, opposite the Kraton Kasepuhan, Cirebon, Indonesia. Believed to be first built in 1489, it has a tiered roof and is similar in style to the Agung Mosque in Banten.
