= Masjid Al-Taqwa (Altadena, California) =

Mosque destroyed by Los Angeles fires

- Location in Los Angeles Location in California

Religion
- Affiliation: Islam
- Branch/tradition: Sunni

Location
- Location: 2183 Lake Ave, Altadena, CA 91001
- Interactive map of Masjid Al-Taqwa
- Coordinates: 34.18334°N 118.13188°W

Website
- http://altaqwamasjid.com/

Masjid Al-Taqwa was a mosque located in Altadena, California, United States. It was located on Lake Ave across from the Eliot Arts Magnet Academy. Founded as a historical African American masjid, the mosque became more multicultural in subsequent decades. Its origins date back to the 1970s. It was the first mosque in the Pasadena-Altadena area. The building was destroyed by the Eaton Fire in early January 2025.

It began as a meeting place for members of the Nation of Islam in the 1970s but became a multicultural Islamic center in the following decades.

== History ==
Masjid Al-Taqwa emerged from the Nation of Islam's Temple No. 27, located in South Central Los Angeles. Early founders of the mosque were African-American Muslims in the Altadena area. One such member, Aaron Abdus-Shakoor, recounted attending Fruit of Islam meetings while the worship group was in its infancy. The Altadena mosque had been called multiple names, including Masjid Taawhid. The community initially rented buildings and later repurposed a thrift store, built in 1950, as a permanent space.

In 1991, the Altadena-Pasadena Dawah Center was granted tax-exempt status. Following a meeting, the group changed the name to Masjid Al-Taqwa, taqwa an Islamic term for "piety" or "fear of God."

The community purchased the facility on April 2, 1999.

=== Rebuilding efforts ===
After the Eaton Fire destroyed the mosque, its leaders started a crowdfunding campaign on LaunchGood to rebuild the property. As of January 26, 2025, it has raised 80% of its US$1,000,000 goal.

== See also ==
- Islam in the United States
