= Kraton Kacirebonan =

Sultan's palace in Cirebon, Indonesia

- Karaton Kacirebonan

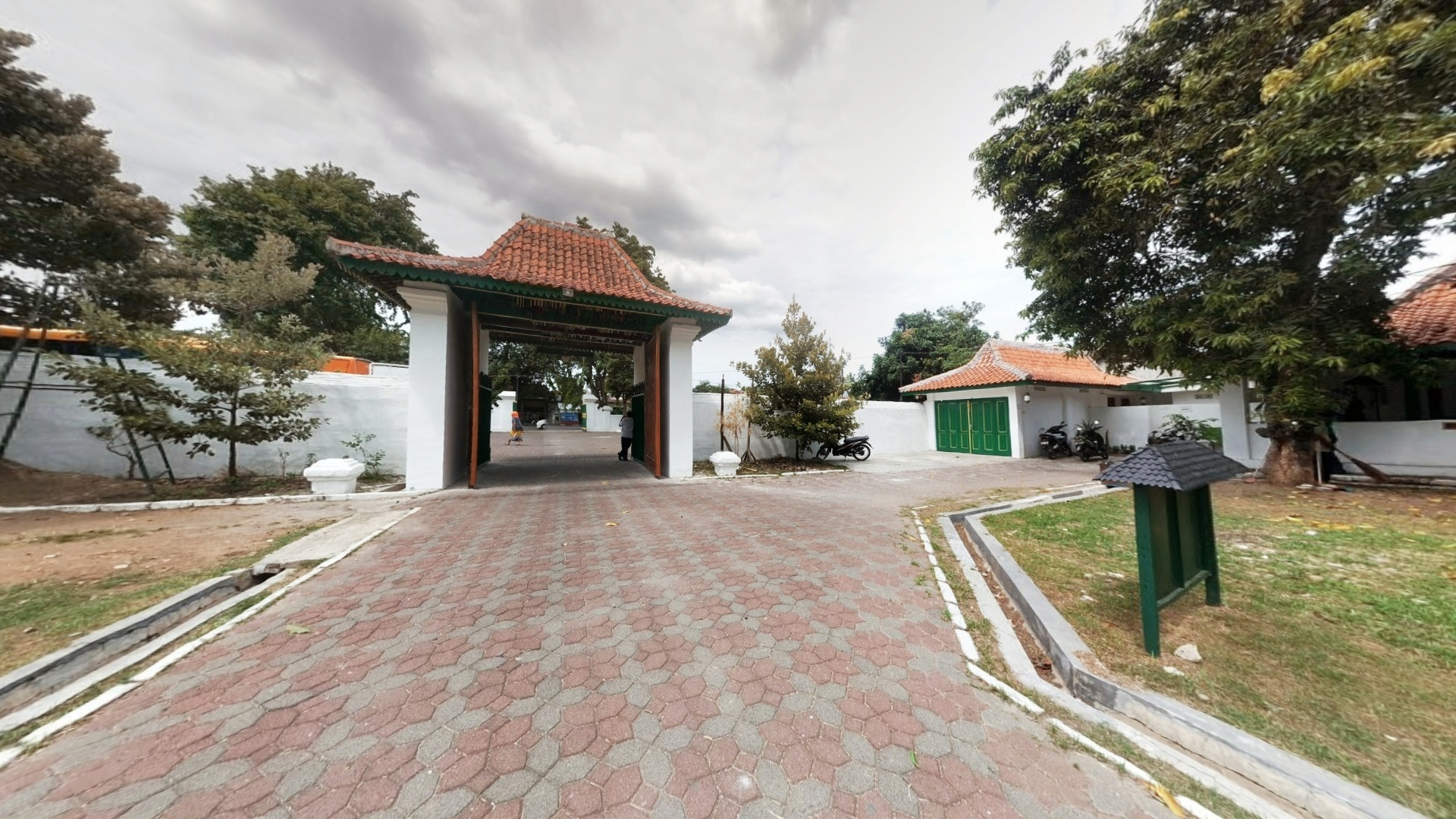
- Keraton Kacirebonan
- Interactive map of the Kraton Kacirebonan area

General information
- Type: Kraton (palace)
- Location: Pulasaren, Pekalipan, Cirebon, Indonesia
- Coordinates: 6.7251°S 108.5653°E
- Inaugurated: 1808 (218 years ago)

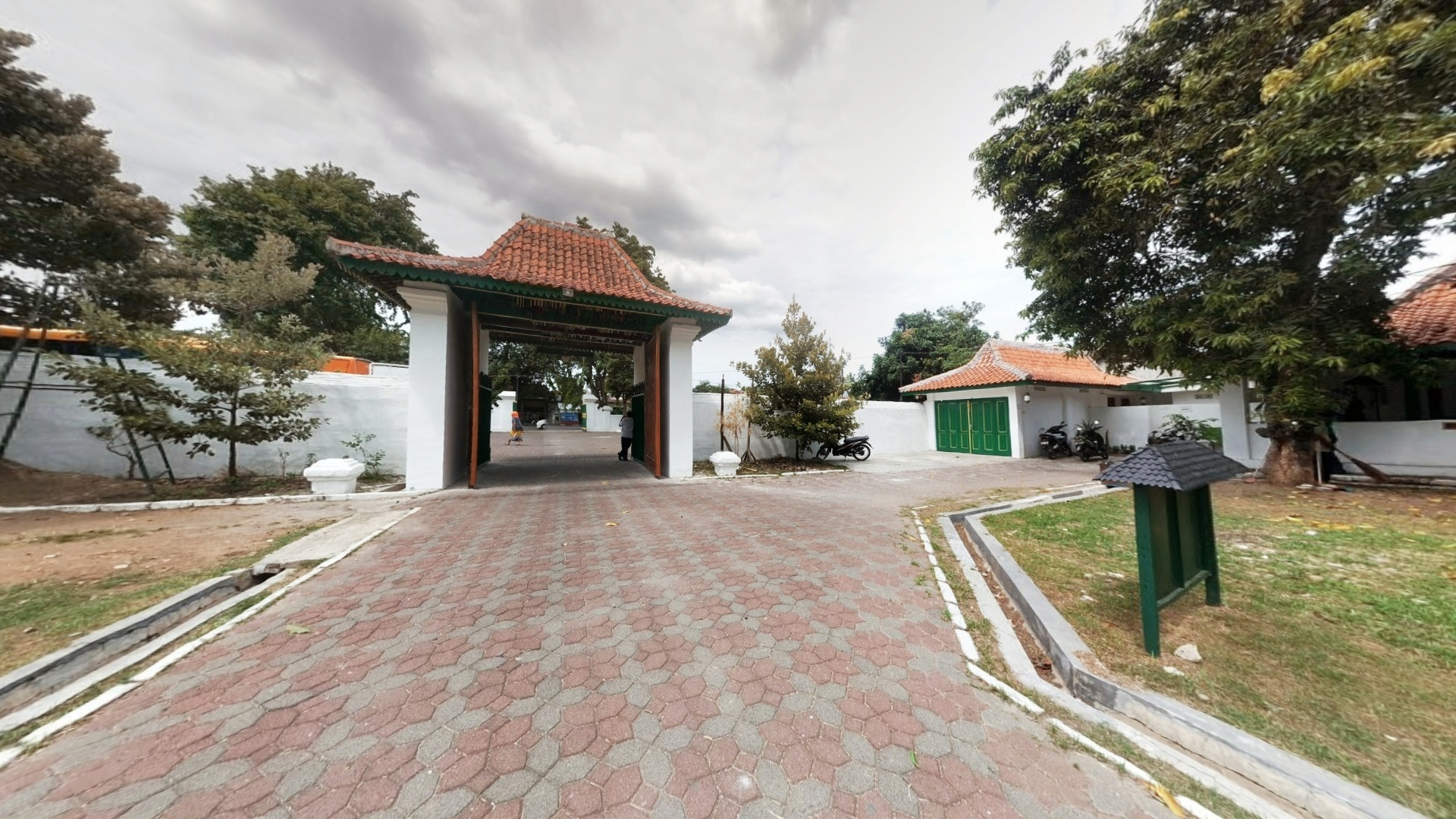
Keraton-kacirebonan

The Kraton Kacirebonan is a kraton (palace) in the Indonesian city of Cirebon. This colonial building was built around the 1800s and has housed many historical relics such as Keris, Wayang puppets, war equipment, Gamelan instruments, and so on. Kacirebonan is in the area of the District Pulasaren Pekalipan village, around 1 kilometer southwest of Kasepuhan Palace and approximately 500 meters south of Keraton Kanoman. Kraton Kacirebonan is positioned north to south (similar to other palaces in Cirebon) with a land area of about 46,500 square meters.

== History ==
History begins when Prince Sultan Kacirebonan King Kanoman, heir to the throne of the Sultanate Kanoman joined the people of Cirebon in rejecting taxes applied by Holland. The application of these taxes led to the revolt of the people in some places. As a result, Prince Raja Kanoman was captured by the Dutch and thrown into the fortress Viktoria in Ambon, stripped of his title, as well as deprived of Sultan Kanoman. However, because the resistance of the people of Cirebon had not abated, the Dutch finally brought back Prince King Kanoman to Cirebon to end the insurgency. Prince Raja Kanoman's aristocratic status was returned, but the rights to the Sultanate Kanoman remained revoked. Upon his return to Cirebon in 1808, Prince Raja Kanoman lived in the complex and had the title of Sultan Cave Sunyaragi Amiril Mukminin Sultan Muhammad Khaerudin or Carbon despite not having the palace. Until he died in 1814, Sultan Carbon remained consistent with its stance and rejected pension from the Netherlands. Carbon was the wife of the late Sultan and was named queen of King Resmining Puri, who later built the palace Kacirebonan using pension money from the Netherlands.

The establishment of the Cirebon Sultanate (1522–1677) is closely related to the presence of the Sultanate of Demak. The Sultanate of Cirebon was established in 1552 by the commander of the Sultanate of Demak; then the Sultan of Cirebon died in 1570 and was succeeded by his son who was very young at the time. Based on the news of the pagoda Gutters and Semarang, the leading founder of Cirebon Sultanate is considered synonymous with the founding figures of the Sultanate of Banten, Sunan Gunung Jati. Sultan of the Sultanate of Cirebon:

- 1479-1568: Sunan Gunung Jati
- 1568-1570: Fatahillah
- 1570-1649: Panembahan Ratu I
- 1649-1677: Panembahan Ratu II

Disunity I, in 1677 The first division of the Sultanate of Cirebon thus occurred during the crowning of three sons of Panembahan Girilaya: Sultan Sepuh, Sultan Anom, and Panembahan Cirebon in 1677. This is a new chapter for the Palace of Cirebon, in which the empire was split into three, each ruling and lowering the next emperor. Thus, the next rulers of the Cirebon Sultanate are:

- Sultan Palace Kasepuhan, Prince Martawijaya, with the title Sultan Muhammad Samsudin Makarimi Sepuh Abil (1677–1703)
- Sultan Kanoman, Prince Kartawijaya, with the title Sultan Muhammad Badrudin Makarimi Anom Abil (1677–1723)
- Prince Wangsakerta, as Panembahan Cirebon with the title of Prince Abdul Kamil Muhammad Nasarudin or Panembahan Tohpati (1677–1713). Prince Wangsakerta was not appointed but only Panembahan Sultan. He does not have jurisdiction or the palace itself but stands as Kaprabonan, a place to learn the intellectual palace.

Disunity II, in 1807, the founding Kacirebonan Succession of the sultan Cirebon generally went smoothly, until the reign of Sultan Anom IV (1798–1803), where there was a split because one of his sons, namely Prince Raja Kanoman, wanted to secede to build the empire itself as the Sultanate Kacirebonan. The will of Prince King Kanoman supported by the Dutch colonial government to release Besluit (Dutch: decree) Governor-General of the Dutch East Indies who raised Prince Raja Kanoman became Sultan Carbon Kacirebonan in 1807 with the restriction that the sons and successors are not entitled to the title of sultan, simply by the title of prince. Since it is in Cirebon Sultanate increased by one ruler again, the Sultanate Kacirebonan, a fraction of the Sultanate Kanoman. The throne of Sultan Kanoman V falls on the son of Sultan Anom IV, also named Sultan Anom Abusoleh Imamuddin (1803–1811). Kacirebonan Palace was built in 1807 during the second split of the Sultanate. The succession of the sultans Generally went smoothly, until the reign of Sultan Anom IV (1798–1803), when the split occurred, one of his sons, namely Prince Raja Kanoman, wanted to build his Sultanate, the Sultanate of Kacirebonan.

== Main Building ==
The architecture and interior of the kraton are a blend of Sundanese, Javanese, Islamic, Chinese, and Dutch styles with European architecture. After the death of Sultan Kacirebonan I Sultan Cerbon Commander of the Faithful in 1814, the queen of King Resminingpuri who is the consort of the late Sultan lived in the area of Taman Sari Cave Sunyaragi. But after having a young child who was then only five, Prince Raja Madenda Hidayat who later became Sultan Kacirebonan II, the queen decided to build the Kacirebonan Palace in Pulosaren with pension money she had rejected previously. During the beginning stages of construction, Queen of King Resminingpuri Kacirebonan also built the main building of the palace and Paseban, as well as a mosque.

== Culture ==
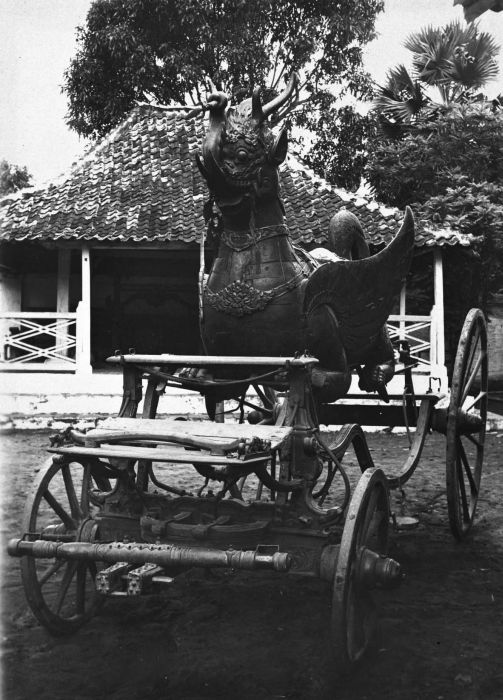
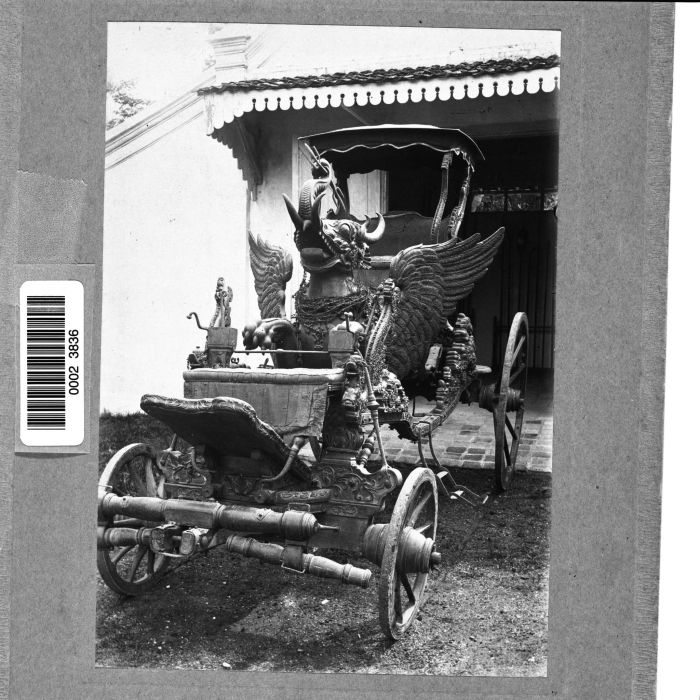
State carriage of the Kraton Kasepuhan (left) and the Kraton Kanoman (right), circa 1910–1940.

During its early formation years, the sultanate actively promoted Islam. Cirebon sent their ulamas to proselytise Islam into inland West Java. Together with Banten, it is credited for the Islamization of Sundanese people in West Java as well as coastal Java. Because the sultanate is located on the border of Javanese and Sundanese cultural realms, the Sultanate of Cirebon demonstrates both aspects, reflected in its art and architecture, and also in its language. The Sultanate Pakungwati palace shows the influence of Majapahit's red brick masonry architecture. The styles and titles of its officials were also influenced by Javanese Mataram courtly culture.

As a port city, Cirebon attracts settlers from around and overseas alike. Cirebon culture was described as Java Pasisiran (coastal) culture, similar to those of Banten, Batavia, Pekalongan, and Semarang, with notable influences a mixture of Chinese, Arabic-Islamic, and European influences. The notable one is the Cirebon batik with vivid colours with motifs and patterns that demonstrate Chinese and local influences. Chinese influences can be seen in Cirebon's culture, most notably the Cirebon batik Megamendung pattern that resembles Chinese cloud imagery.

The flag of the former Cirebon Sultanate is called Macan Ali ("Panther of Ali"), with Arabic calligraphy arranged to resemble a panther or tiger; this indicates Islamic influence, and is also a reference to the tiger banner of the Sundanese Hindu King Siliwangi of Pakuan Pajajaran.

The royal carriage of Kasepuhan's Singa Barong and Kanoman's Paksi Naga Liman carriage both resemble the chimera of three animals: eagle, elephant, and dragon. These symbolize Indian Hinduism, Arab Islam, and Chinese influences. The images of Macan Ali, Singa Barong, and Paksi Naga Liman are common motifs in Cirebonese batik.

The remnants of the Cirebon sultanate, Kasepuhan, Kanoman, Kaprabonan, and Kacirebonan Keratons are now run as a cultural institution to preserve Cirebon culture. Each still held their traditional ceremonies and became the patrons of Cirebon arts. Topeng Cirebon mask dance inspired by Javanese Panji cycles is one of the notable Cirebon traditional dances and quite famous within Indonesian dances. Although it did not hold real political power anymore, the royal lineage of Cirebon was still well respected and held in high prestige among the people of Cirebon.

== Tourism ==
The Kacirebonan palace complex of buildings, along with four other palaces, namely, the Kasepuhan palace, palace Kanoman and Kaprabonan, were set to be vital objects which must be protected. The assessment was based on the consideration of the police, with the assessment that the local police are required to put personnel on guard at each of the palaces, including the palace Kanoman.

== Rulers of Kraton Kacirebonan ==
- Pangeran Arya Cirebon, Kamaruddin (1697–1723): Son of Sultan Sepuh I
- Sultan Cirebon I Muhammad Akbaruddin (1723–1734) Son
- Sultan Cirebon II Muhammad Salihuddin (1734–1758) Brother
- Sultan Cirebon III Muhammad Harruddin (1758–1768) Nephew
- Sultan Cirebon IV (1808–1810; died in 1814) Son of Sultan Anom III

== See also ==
- List of monarchs of Java
- Sultanate of Cirebon
- Cirebonese
- History of Indonesia
- List of palaces in Indonesia
