= List of palaces in Indonesia =

List of palaces in Indonesia. Seven out of them are presidential palaces.

Name	Images	Location	Construction started	Architectural style	Owner
Alwatzikoebillah Palace; Istana Alwatzikoebillah ايستان الواتزيكوبالله		Sambas Regency, West Kalimantan		Banjarese	Sultanate of Sambas
Bogor Palace; Istana Bogor ᮄᮞ᮪ᮒᮔ ᮘᮧᮌᮧᮁ Paleis te Buitenzorg		Bogor, West Java; 6.5980°S 106.7973°E	1744	Indies Empire	Indonesia
Cipanas Palace; Istana Cipanas ᮄᮞ᮪ᮒᮔ ᮎᮤᮕᮔᮞ᮪ Tjipanas Paleis		Cianjur Regency, West Java; 6.7336°S 107.0412°E	1740	Dutch Colonial Revival	Indonesia
Garuda Palace; Istana Garuda		Nusantara, Kalimantan; 0.9606°S 116.6937°E	2022	Indonesian	Indonesia
Gedung Agung; Gedung Agung ꦒꦣꦸꦁꦲꦒꦸꦁ		Yogyakarta, Special Region of Yogyakarta; 7.8002°S 110.3643°E	1869	Indies Empire	Indonesia
Istana Negara; Istana Negara; Paleis te Rijswijk		Central Jakarta, Jakarta; 6.1702°S 106.8242°E	1796	Neoclassical, Indies Empire	Indonesia
Kadato Kie; Kadato Kie		Tidore, North Maluku		Tidore	Sultanate of Tidore
Klungkung Palace; Istana Klungkung ᬧᬸᬭᬶ ᬦ᭄ᬓ᭄ᬮᬸᬂᬓᬸᬂ		Klungkung Regency, Bali; 8.37001851992°S 115.402705056°E	Late 17th century	Balinese	Klungkung Kingdom
Kraton Kacirebonan; Keraton Kacirebonan ᮊᮛᮒᮧᮔ᮪ ᮊᮎᮤᮛᮨᮘᮧᮔᮔ᮪ ꦏꦫꦠꦺꦴꦤ꧀ꦏꦕꦶꦫꦼꦧꦺꦴꦤꦤ꧀		Cirebon, West Java; 6.7247°S 108.5654°E	1800	Sundanese, Javanese, Islamic, Chinese, Indies Empire	Sultanate of Cirebon
Kraton Kanoman; Keraton Kanoman ᮊᮛᮒᮧᮔ᮪ ᮊᮔᮧᮙᮔ ꦏꦫꦠꦺꦴꦤ꧀ꦏꦤꦺꦴꦩꦤ꧀		Cirebon, West Java; 6.7224°S 108.5678°E	1678	Sundanese, Javanese, Chinese	Sultanate of Cirebon
Kraton Kasepuhan; Keraton Kasepuhan		Cirebon, West Java	1447	Sundanese, Javanese, Chinese	Sultanate of Cirebon
Kraton Ngayogyakarta Hadiningrat; Keraton Ngayogyakarta Hadiningrat ꦑꦫꦡꦺꦴꦤ꧀ꦔꦪꦺꦴꦒꦾꦑꦂꦡꦲꦢꦶꦟꦶꦁꦫꦠ꧀		Yogyakarta, Special Region of Yogyakarta; 7.8053°S 110.3642°E	1755	Javanese, Portuguese, Indies Empire, Chinese	Yogyakarta Sultanate
Kraton Sumenep; Keraton Sumenep كراتون سَوڠٚنٚبْ		Sumenep Regency, East Java	1781	Javanese, Indies Empire, Islamic, Chinese	Sumenep Regency
Kraton Surakarta Hadiningrat; Keraton Surakarta Hadiningrat ꦑꦫꦠꦺꦴꦤ꧀ꦯꦸꦫꦏꦂꦠꦲꦢꦶꦤꦶꦁꦫꦠ꧀		Surakarta, Central Java		Javanese	Surakarta Sunanate
Luwu Palace; Istana Luwu ᨀᨗᨔᨈᨊ ᨒᨘᨏᨘ		Luwu Regency, South Sulawesi			Luwu Kingdom
Maimun Palace; Istana Maimun ايستان ماءيمون ᯤᯚ᯲ᯖᯊ ᯔᯤᯔᯮᯊ᯲		Medan, North Sumatra; 3.5752°N 98.6839°E	1887	Malay, Islamic, Indian	Sultanate of Deli
Malige Palace; Istana Malige 잇따나 말리게		Baubau, Southeast Sulawesi		Butonese	Buton Sultanate
Merdeka Palace; Istana Merdeka; Paleis te Koningsplein		Central Jakarta, Jakarta; 6.1702°S 106.8242°E	1873	Neoclassical, Indies Empire	Indonesia
Mulawarman Museum; Museum Mulawarman		Kutai Kartanegara Regency, East Kalimantan 0.4133°S 116.9904°E	1932	Art Deco	Indonesia
Pagaruyung Palace; Istana Basa Pagaruyung ايستانو باسو ڤݢرويڠ		Tanah Datar Regency, West Sumatra; 0°26′22″S 100°40′9″E	17th century	Minangkabau	Pagaruyung Kingdom
Palabuhanratu Palace; Istana Palabuhanratu ᮊᮛᮒᮧᮔ᮪ ᮕᮜᮘᮥᮠᮔ᮪ᮛᮒᮥ		Sukabumi Regency, West Java	1960		Indonesia
Palace of Rokan Hulu; Istana Rokan Hulu ايستان روكن هولو		Rokan Hulu Regency, Riau		Malay	Rokan Hulu Kingdom
Pendapa Sabha Swagata Blambangan; Pendapa Sabha Swagata Blambangan ꦥꦼꦤ꧀ꦢꦥꦯꦨꦯ꧀ꦮꦒꦠꦨ꧀ꦭꦩ꧀ꦧꦔꦤ꧀		Banyuwangi Regency, East Java	1773-1782	Javanese	Banyuwangi Regency
Pura Mangkunegaran; Pura Mangkunegaran ꦥꦸꦫꦩꦁꦏꦸꦤꦒꦫꦤ꧀		Surakarta, Central Java		Javanese	Mangkunegaran
Tampaksiring Palace; Istana Tampaksiring ᬧᬸᬭᬶ ᬢᬫᬄᬧᬓᬄᬲᬶᬭᬶᬂ		Gianyar Regency, Bali 8.4390°S 115.3104°E	1957	Modern, Balinese	Indonesia
Ubud Palace; Istana Ubud		Gianyar Regency, Bali	1700s	Balinese	Ubud Kingdom
