= Kraton Sumenep =

Residence of the regent of Sumenep in Indonesia

Kraton Sumenep is the residence of the duke (adipati) of Duchy of Sumenep and regent (bupati) of Sumenep Regency on the Indonesian island of Madura.

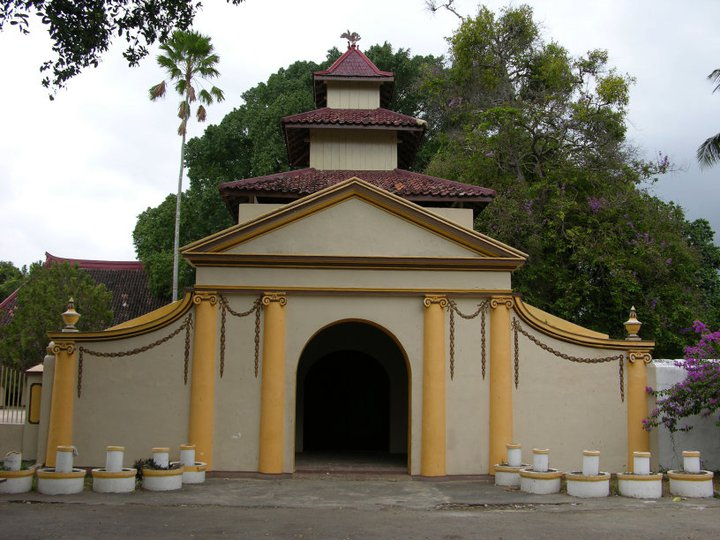
Labhang Museum

It was built in the 18th century by Panembahan Sumala, the son of Kanjeng Tumenggung Aria Tirtanegara (Bindara Saod), the 30th Duke of Sumenep, who was also a descendant of Muslim scholars and his first wife, Nyai Izzah. He is also the stepson of Gusti Raden Ayu Tirtanegara (Raden Ayu Rasmana), who was also duchess of Sumenep with his father. The architect is thought to be the grandson of one of the first Chinese to settle in Sumenep after the massacre of Chinese in Batavia. Part of the building is a museum with a collection of royal possessions.

== See also ==
- Indonesian architecture
- Kraton (Indonesia)
- List of monarchs of Java
- List of palaces in Indonesia
