= Sultanate of Cirebon =

Muslim state in West Java, 1447–1679

Sultanate of Cirebon ᮊᮞᮥᮜ᮪ᮒᮔᮔ᮪ ᮎᮤᮛᮨᮘᮧᮔ᮪ (Sundanese) كسلطانن چيربون (Pegon)
- 1445–1677
- Flag

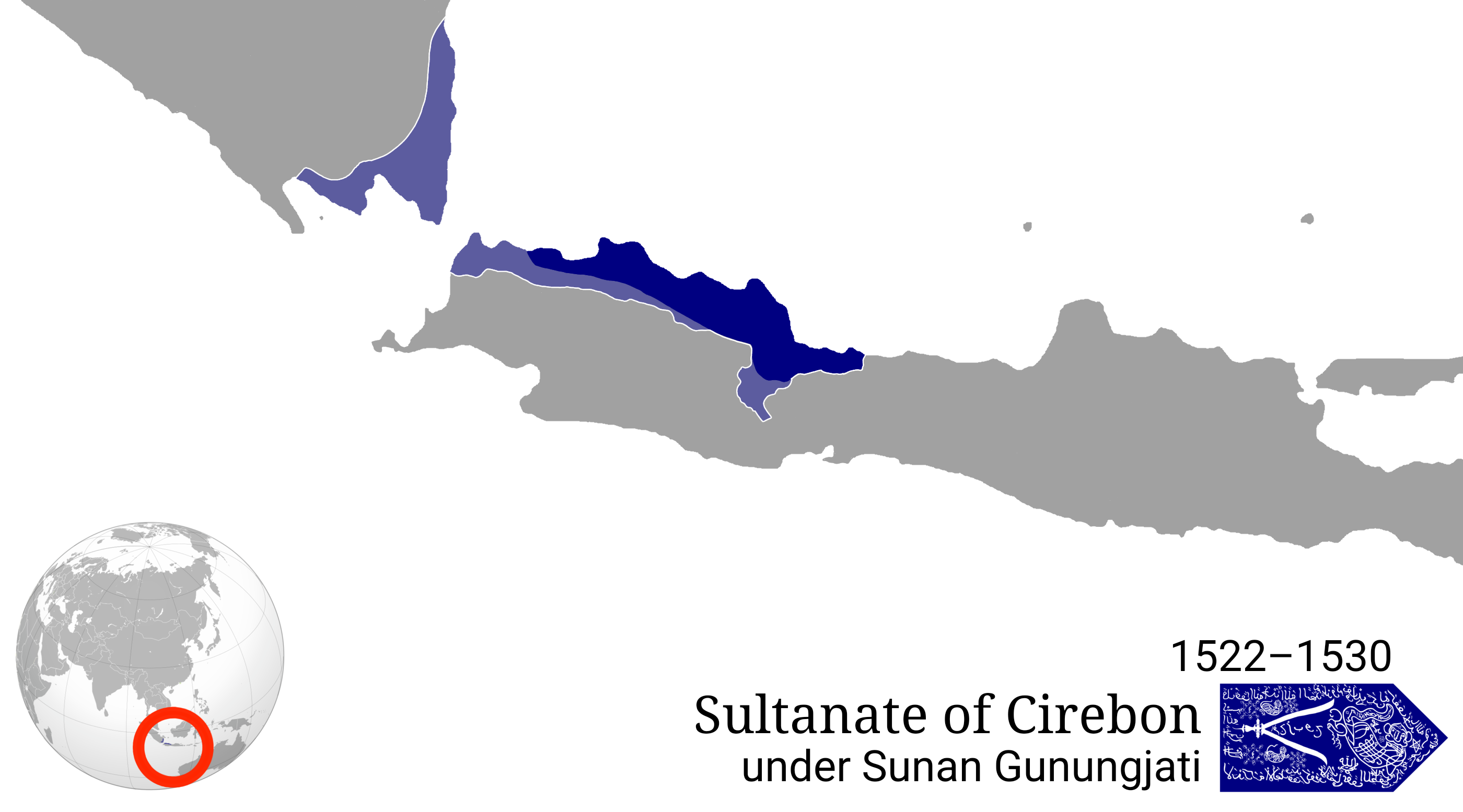
- The Sultanate of Cirebon in the 1520s, during the expansion by Sunan Gunungjati.

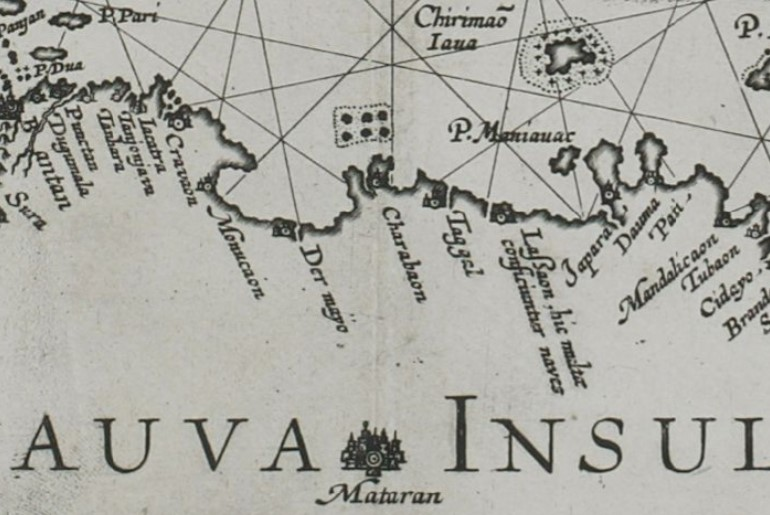
- Map of Java from 1598 by Joannes van Doetecum the Elder, showing the city of Cirebon (Charabaon) with a flag on top of it.
- Status: Vassal of the Sunda Kingdom (1445–1515); Puppet state of Demak (1479–1546); Vassal of the Mataram Sultanate (1613–1705)
- Capital: Cirebon
- Common languages: Cirebonese, Sundanese, Javanese
- Religion: Islam
- Government: Monarchy
  - 1447–1479: Prince Cakrabuana
  - 1479–1568: Syarif Hidayatullah
  - 1649–1677: Panembahan Ratu II
- History
  - Prince Cakrabuana was appointed as the ruler of Cirebon: 1445
  - Cirebon Independence from Sunda Kingdom: 1479
  - Cirebon under the rule of Mataram Sultanate: 1613
  - First disintegration of the Cirebon Sultanate: 1677
  - The founding of Kasepuhan and Kanoman: 1679
  - Final loss of authority to colonial government: 1677
Preceded by
Sunda Kingdom
Succeeded by
Mataram Sultanate
Banten Sultanate
Dutch East Indies
- Today part of: Indonesia

The Sultanate of Cirebon (Indonesian: Kesultanan Cirebon, Pegon: كسلطانن چيربون, Sundanese: ᮊᮞᮥᮜ᮪ᮒᮔᮔ᮪ ᮎᮤᮛᮨᮘᮧᮔ᮪) was an Islamic sultanate in West Java founded in the 15th century. It is said to have been founded by Sunan Gunungjati, as marked by his letter proclaiming Cirebon's independence from Pajajaran in 1482, although the settlement and the polity had been established earlier in 1445. Sunan Gunungjati also established the Sultanate of Banten. It was one of the earliest Islamic states established in Java, along with the Sultanate of Demak.

The sultanate's capital lay around the modern-day city of Cirebon on Java's northern coast. Throughout the 16th and 17th centuries, the sultanate thrived and became a major regional centre of trade and commerce, as well as a prominent centre of Islamic learning. The sultanate split into three royal houses in 1677, and a fourth split off in 1807, each with their own separate lines of descent and kratons; Kraton Kasepuhan, Kraton Kanoman, Kraton Kacirebonan, and Kraton Kaprabonan. They remain today, performing ceremonial duties.

== Etymology ==
There are several suggestions concerning the origin of the name "Cirebon". According to Sulendraningrat, who based it on the Babad Tanah Sunda script, and Atja who based it on the Carita Purwaka Caruban Nagari script, Cirebon was at first a small hamlet built by Ki Gedeng Tapa, which eventually developed into a bustling port village named Caruban (Sundanese for "mixture"), because the port town was a melting pot settled by immigrants from various ethnic groups, religions, languages, customs, and livelihoods.

Another theory suggests that the town's name is derived from rebon, the Sundanese word for small shrimp that live in the area. Initially, a common livelihood in the settlement was fishing and collecting rebon along the coast, making shrimp paste or petis udang from it. The term for water used in shrimp paste manufacturing (belendrang) is cai rebon (Sundanese for "rebon water"), which later gave its name to the town as Cirebon.

== History ==
Most of the history of the Cirebon Sultanate comes from a Javanese chronicle known as a Babad. Several notable chronicles which focused on the history of Cirebon are Carita Purwaka Caruban Nagari and Babad Cerbon. Foreign sources also mentioned Cirebon, such as Tomé Pires' Suma Oriental, written in 1512–1515. The later period of the sultanate is documented in colonial sources of the Dutch East Indies. Other than recording its own history, one of the royal houses of Cirebon, especially Keraton Keprabonan led by the Wangsakerta princes, also actively recorded and researched the history of Java by collecting old manuscripts.

=== Formation ===
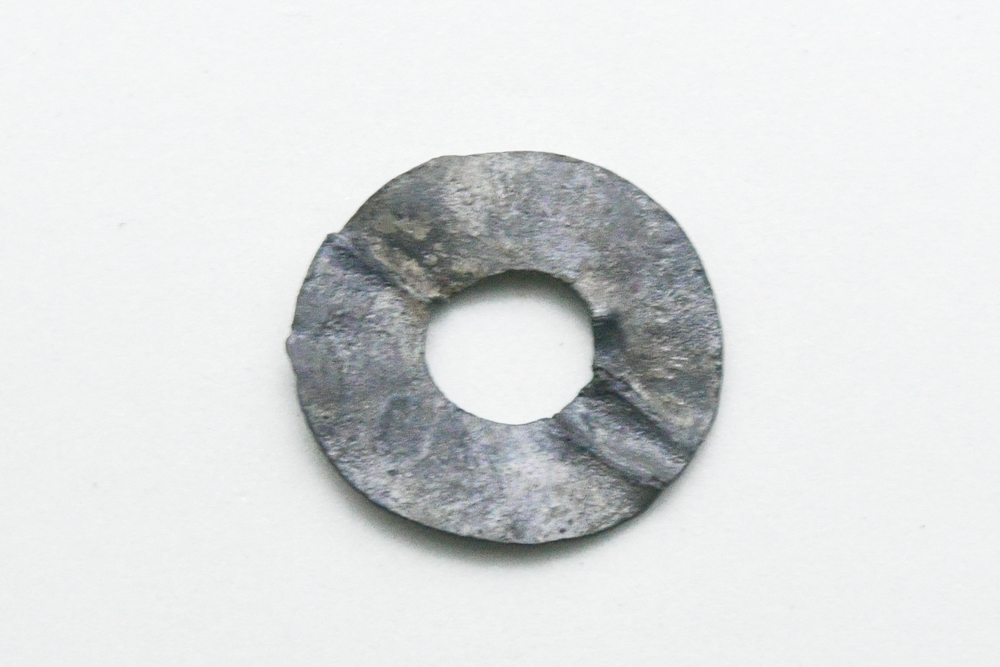
Cirebon Sultanate Coins 1679-1713

The village of Muara Jati was in the coastal area around the port of Cirebon and was part of the Sunda Kingdom, as stated in the travel records of Prince Bujangga Manik, a Hindu Sundanese hermit who visited several Hindu sites in Java and Bali in the late 15th century or early 16th century. The border of the Sunda Kingdom in the west is the Sunda Strait and in the east is the Cipamali River (present-day kali Brebes) and Cisarayu River in Central Java. During this time, Muara Jati was located around 14 kilometres north of modern-day Cirebon. The transformation from a small Hindu coastal fishing village into a thriving Muslim port began with the rule of Ki Ageng Tapa.

==== Ki Ageng Tapa ====
Ki Ageng Tapa (also known as Ki Ageng Jumajan Jati) was a wealthy merchant living in the village of Muara Jati. He was appointed as port master of Muara Jati fishing village by the Sunda king in Kawali, Galuh, located further inland south of Muara Jati. The thriving port town attracted Muslim traders. Ki Gedeng Tapa and his daughter, Nyai Subang Larang, are said to have been converted to Islam. His daughter studied at Quro pesantren (Islamic school) in the Karawang area.

The West Java region including Muara Jati belonged to the Sunda Kingdom, with its capital in Pakuan Pajajaran. The Sunda King Prabu Jayadewata or Sri Baduga Maharaja, popularly known as King Siliwangi, was married to Nyai Subang Larang and had three children; Prince Walangsungsang born in 1423, Princess Rara Santang (Syarifah Mudaim) born in 1426, and Prince Kian Santang (Raden Sangara) born in 1428.

Although Prince Walangsungsang was the first-born son of the king, he did not earn the right of a crown prince of Pakuan Pajajaran because his mother, Nyai Subang Larang, was not the prameswari (queen consort). Another reason was probably because of his conversion to Islam, probably influenced by his mother, Subang Larang, who was a Muslim woman. The state's religion was Sunda Wiwitan (Sundanese ancestral religion), Hinduism and Buddhism. It was his half-brother, King Siliwangi's son from his third wife Nyai Cantring Manikmayang, who was chosen as crown prince, and who later ascended to the throne as King Surawisesa.

In 1442 Prince Walangsungsang married Nyai Endang Geulis, daughter of Ki Gedheng Danu Warsih from the Gunung Mara Api hermitage. Walangsungsang, with his sister Rara Santang, wandered around several hermitages to study spiritualism. At Gunung Amparan Jati they met an ulama, Sheikh Datuk Kahfi from Persia. Walangsungsang, Rara Santang, and Endang Geulis, learned Islam from him. The Sheikh asked the Prince to open a new settlement in the area southeast of Gunung Jati (today the Lemahwungkuk area). Walangsungsang was assisted by Ki Gedheng Danusela, Ki Gedheng Danu Warsih's younger brother. The new settlement was called Dukuh Alang-alang. By clearing the forests, he established a new settlement on 8 April 1445.

==== Ki Gedeng Alang-Alang (reign 1445–1447) ====
People of this new settlement elected Danusela as their new kuwu (village chief), later referred to as Ki Gedeng Alang-alang. He appointed Raden Walangsungsang as his deputy, titled Pangraksabumi. However Ki Gedeng Alang-alang died two years later in 1447.

==== Prince Cakrabuana (reign 1447–1479) ====
After Ki Gedeng Alang-Alang died in 1447, Walangsungsang was appointed as the ruler of the town and established a court, and assumed a new title as Prince Cakrabuana. The coastal port village attracted settlers from overseas as well as inland and formed a thriving village renamed Caruban, which means "mixture" in Sundanase to describe the compositions of its settlers. Two years after its establishment, a record dating from 1447 showed that the settlers of Caruban at that time were 346 people (182 men and 164 women), composed of various ethnic backgrounds; 196 Sundanese, 106 Javanese, 16 Sumatran, 4 Malaccan, 2 Indian, 2 Persian, 3 Siamese, 11 Arabs, and 6 Chinese settlers.

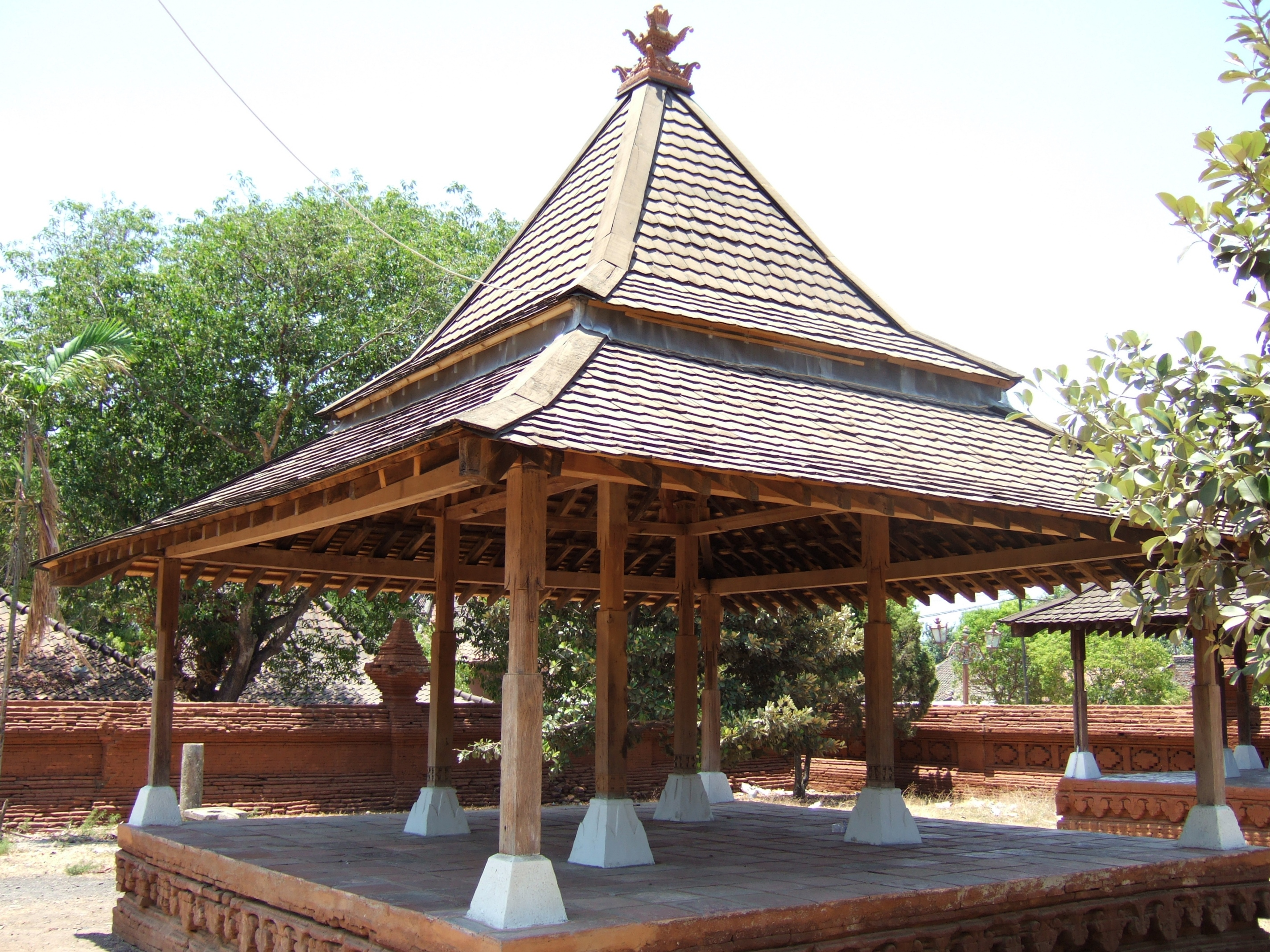
A pendopo pavilion in Kraton Kasepuhan, Cirebon.

After undergoing the hajj, Prince Cakrabuana changed his name to Haji Abdullah Iman. He built a thatched hut and a tajug pavilion called Jalagrahan and expanded it with the name Pakungwati Palace. Today there are pendopos (pavilions) located in front of Kasepuhan Palace, establishing his court in Cirebon, making him the founder of Cirebon. After the death of Cakrabuana's grandfather, Ki Gedeng Tapa (Ki Gedeng Jumajan Jati), Cakrabuana received an inheritance; the Singapura settlement located north of Caruban was merged and incorporated into the Caruban realm. The fortune from the inheritance was used to expand the Pakungwati Palace. His father King Siliwangi sent his envoy Tumenggung Jagabaya and Raja Sengara (Cakrabuana's younger brother), to bestow Prince Carkrabuana with the title Tumenggung Sri Mangana. Cirebon grew into a thriving port and Cakrabuana sent tribute to the main court of Sunda Pajajaran.

The early period of the Cirebon Sultanate was commonly identified as the Pakungwati period which refers to the Pakungwati Palace, a Javanese-style compound consisting of a series of pendopos (pavilions) enclosed within red brick walls and gates in the typical Majapahit style of architecture. The Pakungwati compound is located north of Keraton Kasepuhan and is today incorporated within the Kasepuhan compound. During the Pakungwati period, the Cirebon Sultanate was a unified kingdom under one monarch. He was the first king of Cirebon, ruled from his palace of Pakungwati, and actively spread Islam to the people of Cirebon and West Java.

Meanwhile, Rara Santang during her hajj pilgrimage met Sharif Abdullah of Egypt and got married. She changed her name to Syarifah Mudaim and in 1448 bore a son Sharif Hidayatullah. In 1470 Syarif Hidayatullah went abroad to study at Mecca, Baghdad, Champa, and Samudra Pasai. Later he came home to Java. He learned from Sunan Ampel in East Java, served in the Demak court, and later came back to Cirebon. He asked his uncle, Tumenggung Sri Mangana (Cakrabuana) to establish an Islamic school in Caruban or Carbon.

=== Growth ===
==== Sunan Gunung Jati (1479–1568) ====
After his resignation in 1479, Cakrabuana was succeeded by his nephew, Sharif Hidayatullah (1448–1568), the son of Nyai Rara Santang and Sharif Abdullah of Egypt. He married his cousin, Nyi Mas Pakungwati daughter of Cakrabuana and Nyai Mas Endang Geulis. He is popularly known with his posthumous name, Sunan Gunung Jati; he ascended the throne as Sultan Carbon I and resided in Keraton Pakungwati.

In 1482 Sharif Hidayatullah sent a letter to his grandfather King Siliwangi, stating that Cirebon refused to pay tribute to Pajajaran. Cakrabuana had always paid Pajajaran tribute to acknowledge Sunda overlordship over Cirebon. By doing this Cirebon proclaimed itself as a sovereign independent state. The Cirebon independence proclamation was marked with Chandrasengkala (chronogram) Dwa Dasi Sukla Pakca Cetra Masa Sahasra Patangatus Papat Ikang Sakakala, which corresponds to 2 April 1482. Today, the day is marked by the anniversary of Cirebon Regency.

By 1515, Cirebon was established as an Islamic state. In the Suma Oriental, written in 1512–1515, Tomé Pires, a Portuguese explorer reported:

First the king of Çumda (Sunda) with his great city of Dayo, the town and lands and port of Bantam, the port of Pomdam (Pontang), the port of Cheguide (Cigede), the port of Tamgaram (Tangerang), the port of Calapa (Kelapa), and the port of Chemano (Chi Manuk or Cimanuk), this is Sunda, because the river of Chi Manuk is the limit of both kingdoms.

Now comes Java and we must speak of the kings within the hinterland. The land of Cheroboam (Cherimon), the land of Japura, the land of Locarj (Losari), the land of Tateguall (Tegal), the land of Camaram (Semarang), the land of Demaa (Demak), Tidumar (Tidunan), the land of Japara (Jepara), the land of Ramee (Rembang), the land of Tobam (Tuban), the land of Cedayo (Sedayu), the land of Agasij (Grisee or Gresik), the land of Curubaya (Surabaya), the land of Gamda, the land of Blambangan, the land of Pajarucam (Pajarakan), the land of Camtã, the land of Panarunca (Panarukan), the land of Chamdy, and when its ended we will speak of the great island of Madura.

According to the report, Cirebon was identified as Cheroboam or Cherimon. In 1515 Cirebon was no longer under the authority of the Hindu Sunda Kingdom, but rather identified as Java's north coast port. It referred to Cirebon as an established Muslim state, just like those of Demak and Gresik.

After the news of the Portuguese-Sunda alliance in 1522 became known, Gunungjati nevertheless asked the Demak Sultanate to send troops to Banten. It was likely his son, Hasanudin, who commanded this military operation in 1527, just as the Portuguese fleet was arriving on the coast at Sunda Kelapa, to capture these towns.

Gunungjati had Hasanudin named king of Banten by the Sultan of Demak who, in turn, offered Hasanudin his sister's hand in marriage. Thus a new dynasty and a new kingdom was created. Banten became the capital of this kingdom, and was held as a province under the Sultanate of Cirebon.

Under Gunungjati, the Sultanate of Cirebon enjoyed rapid growth and rose to become a prominent kingdom in the region. The thriving coastal port city became the centre of trade as well as an Islamic learning and dissemination center. The port town attracted traders from Arabia to China. Gunungjati is believed to be the founder of the dynasty that ruled both the Sultanate of Cirebon and Banten. He is also credited as the proselytiser of Islam in West Java. Ulamas from his court and mosque spread Islam to inland Majalengka, Kuningan, Kawali (Galuh), as well as the neighbouring coastal ports of Sunda Kelapa, and Banten.

Large numbers of foreign traders came to establish trade relations with Cirebon. The Chinese Ming Dynasty in particular, established closer relations with the visit of Ma Huan. The ties between China and Cirebon grew much closer when Gunungjati took the hands of Princess Ong Tien — the daughter of the Chinese Emperor — in marriage during his visit to China. With this dynastic marriage, the Chinese Emperor wished to establish close relations and a strategic alliance with Cirebon. It was advantageous for Chinese interest in the region as well as Cirebon's economic interest, as the city welcomed Chinese traders and businesses. After she was married to Gunungjati, Princess Ong Tien changed her name to Nyi Rara Semanding. The Emperor of China brought his daughter some treasures. Most of the relics that Ong Tien brought from China still exist and are stored in the museums of Cirebon royal houses. The close relations between China and Cirebon made Cirebon a popular destination for Chinese immigrants in the following years, as they planned to seek a better life in Indonesia, where they established the Chinese Indonesian community. Cirebon Pecinan (Chinatown) is among the oldest Chinese settlement in Java. Chinese influences can be seen in Cirebon's culture, most notably the Cirebon batik megamendung pattern that resembles Chinese cloud imagery.

In his old age, Gunungjati was more interested in dawah efforts, propagating the Islamic faith to the surrounding areas as an ulama. He groomed his second son, Prince Dipati Carbon, to be his successor. However, the prince died young in 1565 and was posthumously known as Prince Pasarean. Three years later the king died and was buried in Gunung Sembung cemetery, 5 km north of the town centre of Cirebon. Since then he has been popularly referred to by his posthumous name, Sunan Gunung Jati.

==== Fatahillah (1568–1570) ====
After the death of Gunungjati, the throne was vacant since there was no descendant of him considered worthy for the task at that time. General Fatahillah, also known as Fadilah Khan, stepped in to assume the throne. He was the late Sunan's trusted officer that often took the administration role when Gunungjati went out to perform dawah. Fatahillah's rule was considered an interlude that only lasted for two years, as he died in 1570. He was buried alongside the tomb of Gunungjati in Astana Gunung Sembung Jinem Building.

==== Panembahan Ratu (1570–1649) ====
After the death of Fatahillah, there was no other appropriate candidate for king. The throne fell to the great grandson of Gunungjati, Pangeran Mas, the son of the late Prince Suwarga, grandson of Gunungjati. Pangeran Mas then held the title Panembahan Ratu I and ruled for more than 79 years. During his rule, he paid more attention to strengthening religious affairs and spreading Islam. As the centre of Islamic learning in the region, Cirebon's influence penetrated inland and influenced the recently established Mataram Sultanate in southern Central Java. However, since the king was more interested to become an ulama, Cirebon failed to recruit Mataram into its sphere of power, and Mataram grew more powerful ever since.

By the 17th century Mataram rose to be a regional power under Sultan Agung's reign. Around 1617 Agung launched his westward campaign targeted against Dutch settlements in Batavia, and rallied his massive troops near Cirebon's border. Agung urged the aged Panembahan Ratu to be his ally in his campaign to expel the Europeans out of Java. By doing so Cirebon become Mataram's ally, and Cirebon came under Mataram's influence. For his campaign against Batavia, he needed support and supplies across northern West Java, and asked Cirebon and regents in West Java to support him. However the Sundanese Priangan menak (nobles) of Sumedang and Ciamis, suspected that Agung's campaign was in actuality a strategy to occupy their lands. The Sundanese nobles fought against Mataram, and Agung later asked Cirebon to quell the Sumedang and Ciamis rebellion instead. In 1618 and 1619 both Sumedang and Ciamis were defeated by Cirebon. Both fell under Mataram rule, and in 1628–29 Sultan Agung of Mataram launched the failed Siege of Batavia.

The realm of the Sultanate of Cirebon at that time included Indramayu, Majalengka, Kuningan, and the modern Cirebon Regency. Although officially Cirebon was still an independent and sovereign state, in practice Cirebon fell within Mataram's sphere of influence. The Mataram rule upon the aforementioned region exposed the Sundanese people to Javanese cultures. When Panembahan Ratu died in 1649 he was succeeded by his grandson, Panembahan Girilaya.

=== Decline ===
==== Panembahan Girilaya (1649–1677) ====
After the death of Panembahan Ratu in 1649, the throne was succeeded by his grandson, Prince Karim or Prince Rasmi, since the latter's father, Prince Seda ing Gayam (Panembahan Adiningkusuma) died first. Prince Rasmi then assumed the name of his deceased father, Panembahan Adiningkusuma, also known as Panembahan Ratu II. He is posthumously referred to as Panembahan Girilaya.

During the reign of Panembahan Adiningkusuma, the Sultanate of Cirebon was sandwiched between two great powers, the Sultanate of Banten in the west, and Mataram Sultanate in the east. Banten suspected Cirebon had grown closer to Mataram, since Amangkurat I of Mataram was Panembahan Adiningkusuma's father in-law. Mataram, on the other hand, suspected that Cirebon was not sincerely cementing the alliance with their Central Javanese counterpart since Panembahan Adiningkusuma and Sultan Ageng Tirtayasa of Banten belonged to the same Sundanese Pajajaran lineage.

Although Cirebon had never been attacked by Mataram since 1619, Cirebon has been practically held under Mataram's influence and acts as a vassal. In 1650 Mataram asked Cirebon to urge Banten to submit under Mataram domination. Banten refused, and in response, Mataram urged Cirebon to attack Banten. In 1650 Cirebon sent 60 ships to attack Banten's port of Tanahara. However, this naval campaign ended in the disastrous defeat of Cirebon. Around the time, Cirebon's relations with Mataram had been strained. The tension culminated with the execution of Panembahan Adiningkusuma in Plered, while Prince Mertawijaya and Prince Kertawijaya were taken as hostages in Mataram.

Panembahan Adiningkusuma was summoned to Plered in Mataram by his father in-law, Susuhunan Amangkurat I of Mataram. However, he was executed instead. From his marriage with the daughter of Sunan Amangkurat I, Panembahan Adiningkusuma had three children: Prince Martawijaya, Prince Kertawijaya, and Prince Wangsakerta. He was entombed on Giriloyo hill near Yogyakarta, near the royal tomb of the Mataram kings in Imogiri, Bantul Regency.

==== First disintegration (1677) ====
With the death of Panembahan Girilaya, Cirebon was left without a monarch. Prince Wangsakerta assumed the everyday administration, but was worried about the fate of his elder brothers being held as hostages in the Mataram court. Because of this incident, the Cirebon succession was also held hostage by Mataram, and by their own grandfather Amangkurat I. Wangsakerta went to Banten to seek Sultan Ageng Tirtayasa's help to free his brothers. The sultan was the son of Prince Abu Maali that had died in the 1650 war with Cirebon. Tirtayasa agreed to assist Cirebon and saw it as an opportunity to improve diplomatic relations between Banten and Cirebon. Taking advantage of the outbreak of the Trunojoya rebellion against Mataram, Sultan Ageng Tirtayasa secretly supported the revolt and managed to save the two Cirebon princes.

However, Sultan Ageng Tirtayasa saw an opportunity to impose Banten's influence upon Cirebon. He crowned both princes he saved as the sultans, Prince Mertawijaya as Sultan Kasepuhan, and Prince Kertawijaya as Sultan Kanoman. By doing so, the Sultan of Banten disintegrated and weakened while the Sultanate of Cirebon fragmented into several petty states. On the other hand, Prince Wangsakerta who had fought for 10 years, was only given a small title and estate. This divisive strategy was meant to weaken Cirebon and to prevent Cirebon to be Mataram's ally and becoming a menace to Banten in the future.

The first disintegration of the Cirebon lineage took place in 1677 when all three sons of Panembahan Girilaya inherited the Sultanate of Cirebon. The three princes ascended their offices as Sultan Sepuh, Sultan Anom, and Panembahan Cirebon. The change of the Panembahan title to Sultan was because the title was bestowed by Sultan Ageng Tirtayasa of Banten.

- Sultan Kasepuhan, Prince Martawijaya, with official regal title Sultan Sepuh Abil Makarimi Muhammad Samsudin (1677–1703) ruled Keraton Kasepuhan
- Sultan Kanoman, Prince Kartawijaya, with official regal title Sultan Anom Abil Makarimi Muhammad Badrudin (1677–1723) ruled Keraton Kanoman
- Panembahan Keprabonan Cirebon, Prince Wangsakerta, with official title Pangeran Abdul Kamil Muhammad Nasarudin or Panembahan Tohpati (1677–1713) ruled Keraton Keprabonan

Sultan Ageng Tirtayasa enthroned the two oldest princes as sultans, Sultan Sepuh and Sultan Anom, in Banten. Each sultan ruled over their own subjects, and inherited their own lands. Sultan Sepuh ruled the former Pakungwati palace and expanded it to become Keraton Kasepuhan. Sultan Anom build a new palace, Keraton Kanoman, located several hundred meters north of the Kasepuhan Palace. Prince Wangsakerta, the youngest, was not enthroned as sultan but remained a Panembahan. He neither inherited lands nor subjects. His estate was instead established a kaprabonan (paguron), a type of school to educate Cirebon intellectuals.

In the Cirebon tradition since 1677, each of the three branch lineages descends its own line of sultans or rulers. Under royal tradition, the heir should be the oldest son, or if not possible, a grandson. In some instances, a relative could assume the office for a small period of time.

==== Second disintegration (1807) ====
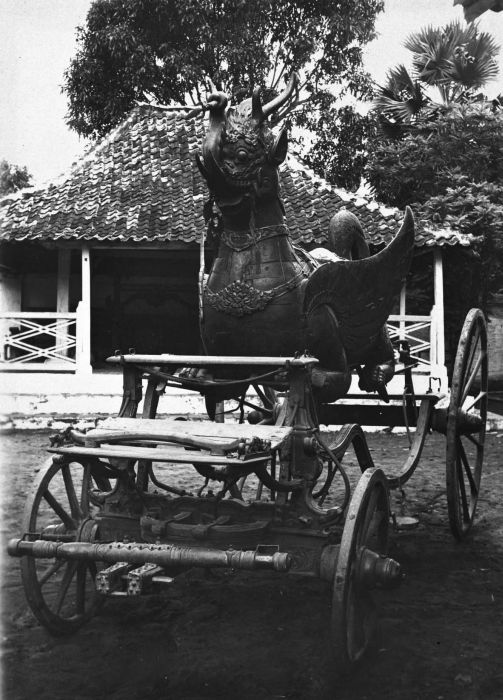
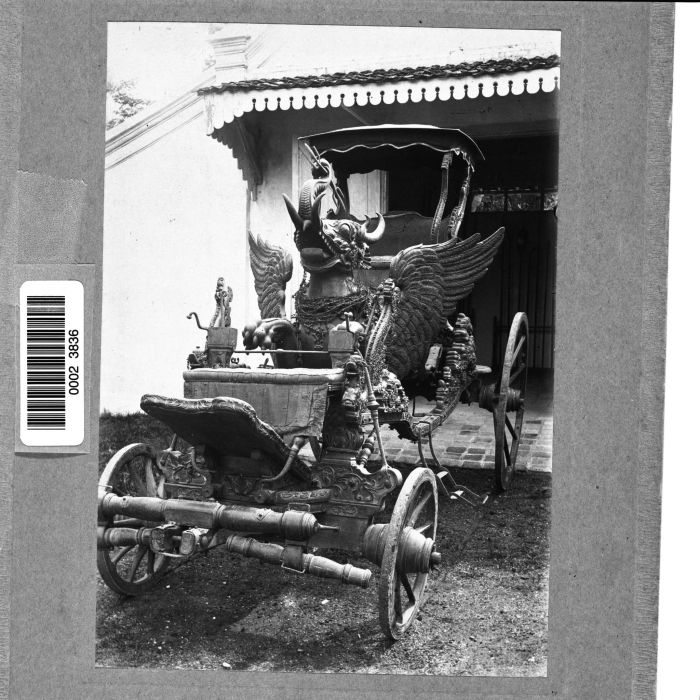
State carriage in the Kanoman kraton (right) and the Kasepuhan kraton (left), circa 1910-1940.

For more than a century, the succession of the Cirebon lineages was conducted without any significant problems. However, by the end of Sultan Anom IV's reign (1798–1803), Keraton Kanoman faced succession disputes. One of the princes, Pangeran Raja Kanoman, demanded his share of the throne and separated the kingdom by forming his own called Kesultanan Kacirebonan.

Pangeran Raja Kanoman was supported by the Dutch East Indies by an issue of a besluit (official letter) from Governor General of Dutch East Indies appointing Pangeran Raja Kanoman as Sultan Carbon Kacirebonan in 1807. However the successor of Kacirebonan did not have the right to use the title "Sultan", and the rulers of Keraton Kacirebonan used the title "Pangeran" instead. Since then, Cirebon had another additional ruler, the ruler of Keraton Kacirebonan, separated from Keraton Kanoman. The Sultanate of Cirebon disintegrated into four lineages. Meanwhile, the throne of Kanoman was succeeded by Sultan Anom IV also known as Sultan Anom Abusoleh Imamuddin (1803–1811).

==== Colonial era ====
Since 1619, the Dutch East India Company had firmly established their base in Batavia, and since the 18th century, the inland mountainous region of Priangan had also been under their possession, ceded from Banten and Mataram. After Dutch intervention in 1807, the Dutch East Indies government has exercised further into the internal affairs of the Cirebon states. All of the four keratons finally held no real political power, and would then be held as a protectorate under the Dutch East Indies colonial government.

In 1906 and 1926, all Cirebon keratons finally lost their authority over their city and lands. The sultanates' authority was officially disbanded by the Dutch East Indies government through the establishment of Gemeente Cheribon (Cirebon Municipality), which consists of 1,100 hectares, with around 20,000 inhabitants. In 1942, the Cirebon city's area was expanded further to 2,450 hectares. The remnants of the Cirebon sultanates (the Kasepuhan, Kanoman, Keprabonan, and Kacirebonan kratons) now only held ceremonial status.

==== Republic of Indonesia era ====
After the war of independence and the establishment of Republic of Indonesia, each sultanate of Cirebon became part of the republic. The real authority was held by bupatis (regent) and walikota (major) of the remnant of Cirebon Sultanates: City and Regency of Cirebon, Indramayu, Majalengka, and Kuningan. All regencies become part of West Java province. Similar to the Dutch East Indies colonial era, the royal houses (the Kasepuhan, Kanoman, Keprabonan, and Kacirebonan kratons) only held ceremonial status as a local cultural symbol. Each royal house still descended from the royal family and enthroned their own kings.

After the fall of Suharto and the advent of the reformation era of democratic Indonesia, there was an aspiration to form a Cirebon province, a new province separated from West Java. The territory of the proposed new province corresponds to the former realm of the Cirebon Sultanate (Cirebon, Indramayu, Majalengka, and Kuningan). The formation of the new kingdom-based province is similar to those of the Special Region of Yogyakarta. However, the idea remains a proposal and has not been conducted yet. Because of a lack of funding and maintenance, all of the four keratons of Cirebon are in a state of disrepair. In 2012, the government planned to restore the four keratons, or palaces, in Cirebon—the Kasultanan Kasepuhan, Kanoman, Kacirebonan, and Keprabonan palaces—which by then are still in various stages of ruin.

== Culture ==
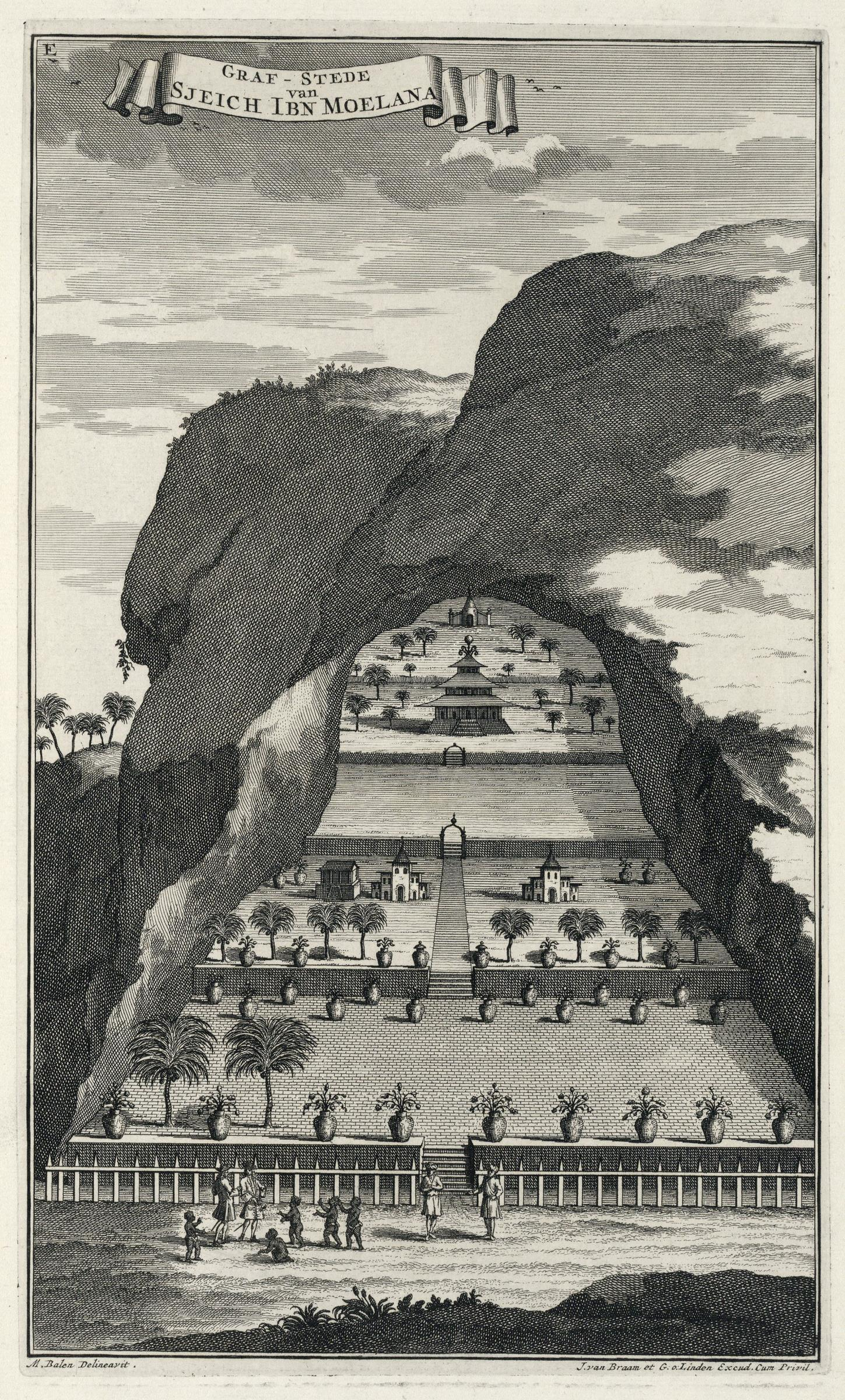
Grave of Sheikh Ibn Moelana, by Matijs Balen, engraved in 1724

During its early formation years, the sultanate actively propagated Islam. Cirebon sent their ulamas to proselytise Islam into inland West Java. Together with Banten, they are credited for the Islamization of the Sundanese people in West Java as well as coastal Java. Because the Sultanate is located on the border of the Javanese and Sundanese cultural realms, the Sultanate of Cirebon demonstrates both aspects, reflected in its art, architecture, and language. The Sultanate of Pakungwati Palace shows the influence of Majapahit red brick masonry architecture. The styles and titles of its officials are also influenced by Javanese Mataram courtly culture.

As a port city, Cirebon attracts settlers from around and overseas alike. Cirebon culture was described as Java Pasisiran (coastal) culture, similar to those of Banten, Batavia, Pekalongan, and Semarang, with notable influences and mixtures of Chinese, Arabic-Islamic, and European. The Cirebon batik has vivid colours with motifs and patterns that demonstrate Chinese and local influences. Chinese influences can be seen in Cirebon's culture, most notably the Cirebon batik Megamendung pattern that resembles Chinese cloud imagery.

Some of the royal symbols of the Cirebon Sultanate describe their legacy and influences. The banner of Cirebon Sultanate is called "Macan Ali" (Ali's panther) with Arabic calligraphy arranged to resemble a panther or tiger, describing both Islamic influence and also the influence from the Hindu Pajajaran Sundanese King Siliwangi's tiger banner. The royal carriage of Kasepuhan's Singa Barong and Kanoman's Paksi Naga Liman resembles the mixture of three animals; eagle, elephant, and dragon, to symbolize Indian Hinduism, Arabic Islam, and Chinese influences. The images of Macan Ali, Singa Barong, and Paksi Naga Liman are also often featured as patterns in Cirebon batik.

The remnants of the Cirebon Sultanate; Kasepuhan, Kanoman, Kaprabonan, and Kacirebonan keratons are now run as cultural institutions to preserve Cirebon culture. Each still hold their traditional ceremonies and are patrons of Cirebon art. Topeng Cirebon mask dance, inspired by Javanese Panji cycles is one of the notable Cirebon traditional dances and is known as an Indonesian dance. Although it does not hold real political power anymore, the royal lineage of Cirebon is still well respected and held in high prestige among the people of Cirebon.

== List of sultans ==
1. Prince Cakrabuana: 1447–1479, is considered the founder of the Cirebon Sultanate.
2. Sunan Gunungjati (Sultan Cirebon I): 1479–1568
3. Fatahillah: 1568–1570, the crown prince died the position of head of government was carried out by Fatahillah.
4. Panembahan Ratu I (Sultan Cirebon II): 1570–1649
5. Panembahan Ratu II (Sultan Cirebon III): 1649–1677

In 1679 the Sultanate of Cirebon was divided into two kingdoms, namely Kasepuhan and Kanoman, due to the struggle for power between the brothers.

== Family tree ==
Family tree of Cirebon Rulers

Gunung Jati^{(1)} r. 1479-1568
Hasanuddin; Banten r. 1552-1570	Pangeran; Pasarean
Banten Sultans
Pangeran; Suwarga
Panembahan; Ratu I^{(2)} r. 1570-1649
Pangeran; Seda Ing; Gayam
Panembahan; Ratu II^{(3)} r. 1649-1677
Kasepuhan; Branch	Kanoman; Branch	Kapraboan; Branch
Sepuh I Muhammad; Syamsuddin; Kasepuhan^{(1)} r. 1677-1703	Anom I Muhammad; Badruddin; Kanoman^{(1)} r. 1677-1703	Muhammad; Nasruddin; Kapraboan^{(1)} r. 1677-1713
Kacirebonan; Branch
Sepuh II; Jamaluddin; Kasepuhan^{(2)} r. 1703-1723	Pangeran; Arya Cirebon; Kamaruddin; Kacirebonan^{(1)} r. 1697-1723	Anom II; Kanoman^{(2)} r. 1703-1706	Muhammad; Muhyiddin; Kapraboan^{(2)} r. 1725-1731
Sepuh III; Muhammad; Zainuddin; Kasepuhan^{(3)} r. 1723-1753	Cirebon I Muhammad; Akbaruddin; Kacirebonan^{(2)} r. 1723-1734	Cirebon II; Muhammad; Salihuddin; Kacirebonan^{(3)} r. 1734-1758	Pangeran	Anom III; Muhammad; Alimuddin; Kanoman^{(3)} r. 1719-1732	Muhammad; Tahir Yarini; Sabirin; Kapraboan^{(3)} r. 1752-1773
Sepuh IV; Muhammad; Zainuddin; Kasepuhan^{(4)} r. 1753-1773	Cirebon III; Muhammad; Harruddin; Kacirebonan^{(4)} r. 1758-1768	Anom IV; Khairuddin; Kanoman^{(4)} r. 1744-1797	Cirebon IV; Kacirebonan^{(5)} r. 1808-1810
Sepuh V Safiuddin; Kasepuhan^{(5)} r. 1773-1786	Sepuh VI; Kasepuhan^{(6)} r. 1786-1791	Anom V Imanuddin; Kanoman^{(5)} r. 1797-1807
Sepuh VII; Jauharuddin; Kasepuhan^{(7)} r. 1791-1816	Sepuh VIII; Syamsuddin; Kasepuhan^{(8)} r. 1816-1843	Anom VI; Muhammad; Kamaruddin; Kanoman^{(6)} r. 1807-1851
Sepuh IX; Raja; Syamsuddin; Kasepuhan^{(9)} r. 1843-1853	Anom VII; Muhammad; Kamaruddin; Kanoman^{(7)} r. 1851-1871	Pangeran; Raja; Kaprabon; Kanoman (regent)^{(8)} r. 1871-1879
Sepuh X Raja Dipati; Satria; Kasepuhan^{(10)} r. 1853-1875	Pangeran; Jayawikarta; Kasepuhan (regent)^{(11)} r. 1875-1880	Sepuh XI; Raja Atmaja; Kasepuhan^{(12)} r. 1880-1885	Anom VIII; Raja; Zulkarnain; Kanoman^{(9)} r. 1879–1934
Sepuh XII; Raja Aluda; Tajulariffin; Kasepuhan^{(13)} r. 1885-1942	Anom IX; Nurbuat; Kanoman^{(10)} r. 1934–1935
Sepuh XIII; Raja; Rajaningrat; Kasepuhan^{(14)} r. 1942-1969	Anom X Muhammad; Nurus; Kanoman^{(11)} r. 1935–1989
Sepuh XIV; Raja; Pakuningrat; Kasepuhan^{(15)} r. 1969-2010	Anom XI; Muhammad; Jalaluddin; Kanoman^{(12)} r. 1989–2002
Sepuh XV; Arif; Natadiningrat; Kasepuhan^{(16)} r. 2010-present	Anom XII; Muhammad; Salahuddin; Kanoman^{(13)} r. 2002-2003	Anom XIII; Muhammad; Amiruddin; Kanoman^{(14)} r. 2003-present

== See also ==
- Cirebonese
- History of Indonesia
- List of monarchs of Java
