= Sunan Gunungjati =

One of nine Islamic saints in Java

Sultan of Cirebon
- Reign: 1479 – 1568
- Predecessor: Prince Cakrabuana
- Successor: Fatahillah
- Born: Syarif Hidayatullah; 1448
- Died: 19 September 1568 (aged 119–120); Pakungwati Palace, Sultanate of Cirebon
- Burial: Gunung Sembung
- Spouse: Nyai Ratu Dewi Pakungwati; Nyai Ratu Kawunganten; Nyai Babadan; Nyai Ageng Tepasari; Nyai Lara Baghdad; Ong Tien Nio
- Issue: Sabakingking; Pasarean; Ratu Ayu; Winahon; Trusmi; Bratakelana; Jayalelana
- Father: Syarif Abdullah Maulana Huda
- Mother: Nyai Rara Santang
- Religion: Sunni Islam

Sunan Gunungjati (born: Syarif Hidayatullah (Arabic: شريف هداية الله, Sharīf Hidāyah Allāh); 1448–1568) was one of the Wali Songo or nine saints of Islam revered in Indonesia for the propagation of Islam as the dominant religion in the region. He founded the Sultanate of Banten and the Sultanate of Cirebon on the north coast of Java.

== Early life ==
Gunungjati was born as Syarif Hidayatullah in 1448 CE, the child of a dynastic union between Syarif Abdullah Maulana Huda, a Hashemite of the Azhmatkhan branch of the Ba 'Alawi sada, and Nyai Rara Santang, daughter of Prabu Siliwangi, King of Sunda (Pajajaran). As such, Syarif Hidayatullah could claim descent, on his paternal side, from the Islamic prophet Muhammad, and on his maternal side, from a Hindu Devaraja of the Sunda Kingdom.

There is much historical uncertainty as to his early life and later career in the Indonesian Archipelago. Some say that he was born in Pasai, one of the earliest centres of Islam in Southeast Asia; whilst others say that he was born in Pajajaran, the capital of his maternal grandfather's Kingdom of Sunda. He is reported to have married a sister of Trenggana, Sultan of Demak, and to have led military expeditions for Demak against Sunda. As Fatahillah defeated the Portuguese at their base in Sunda Kelapa, he renamed it Jayakarta in 1527.

To this day, his victory over the Portuguese is commemorated as the official anniversary of the founding of Jakarta. The many conflicting stories about Sunan Gunungjati led some scholars to conclude that he might be a conflation of more than one historical figure.

== Education ==
Syarif Hidayatullah studied Islam under the guidance of venerated scholars in Egypt, some of whom probably included leading Sufis, during his fourteen years of peregrinations overseas. It is assumed that he must have also undertaken his pilgrimage to Mecca and Medina.

== Leadership ==
Sunan Gunungjati was the only one of the Wali Songo to have assumed a sultan's coronet. He used his kingship — imbued with the twin authority of his paternal Hashemite lineage and his maternal royal ancestry — to propagate Islam all along the Pesisir, or northern coast of Java.

== Proselytization ==
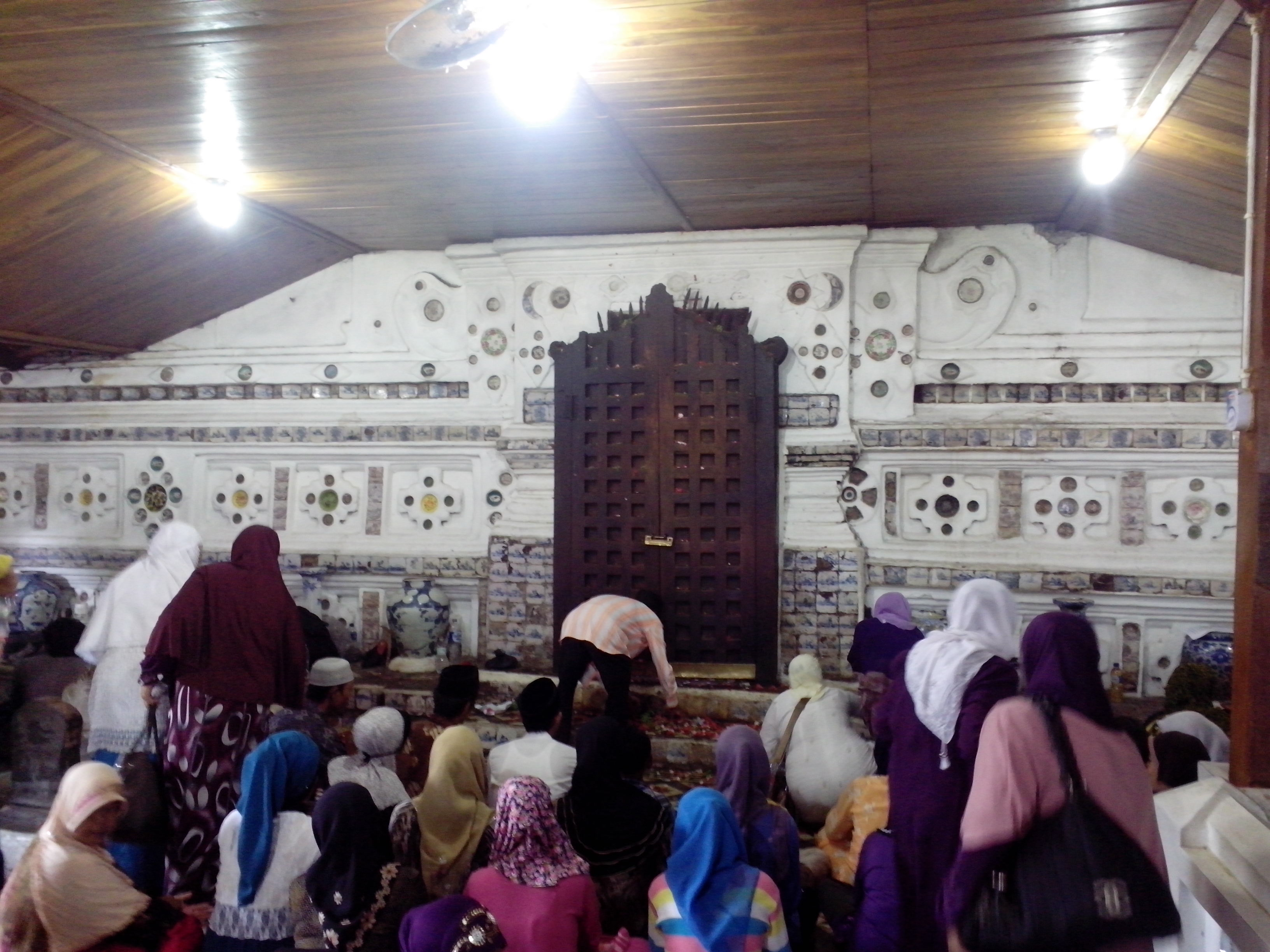
Pilgrims praying before the tomb of Sunan Gunungjati at Sunan Gunungjati cemetery site, Cirebon.

In dawah (Islamic proselytization), Gunungjati upheld the strict methodology propagated by Middle Eastern sheikhs, as well as developing basic infrastructure and building roads connecting isolated areas of the province. He and his prince Maulana Hasanuddin took part in several expeditions, particularly in Banten; the leader of Banten later voluntarily submitted the leadership of the region to Sunan Gunungjati but was eventually appointed as the new leader of the province which later became the kingdom of Banten.

Around the age of 89, Sunan Gunungjati started to focus on dawah and began moves to appoint a successor. Pangeran (Prince) Pasarean later became the new king.

== Death ==
In 1568, Sunan Gunungjati died in Cirebon and was buried in Gunung Sembung, Gunung Jati, around 5 km to the north of the town centre. His tomb has become one of Java's most important pilgrimage points. The tomb enclosure is embedded with porcelain plates, which are replaced with new pieces bought by well wishers. Today the pieces are largely of European or Japanese origin.

== See also ==
- Islam in Indonesia
- The spread of Islam in Indonesia (1200 to 1600)

== See also ==
=== Bibliography ===
- Sunyoto, Agus (2014). Atlas Wali Songo: Buku Pertama yang Mengungkap Wali Songo Sebagai Fakta Sejarah (6th edition). Depok: Pustaka IIMaN. ISBN 978-602-8648-09-7.
