= Istana =

Istana is an Indonesian and Malay word meaning "palace". It may refer to:

== Indonesia ==
- Istana Bogor, a presidential palace in Bogor, West Java
- Istana Cipanas, a presidential palace in Cipanas, West Java
- Istana Maimun, the Sultanate of Deli palace, Medan, North Sumatra
- Istana Merdeka, a presidential palace in Gambir, Jakarta
- Istana Negara (Jakarta), a presidential palace in Gambir, Jakarta
- Istana Pagaruyung, or Pagaruyung Palace, a historic site in West Sumatra
- Istana Tampaksiring, a presidential palace in Tampaksiring, Gianyar Regency, Bali

== Malaysia ==
- Istana Alam Shah, the official palace of the Sultan of Selangor
- Istana Besar, a royal palace of the Sultan of Johor in Johor Bahru
- Istana Melawati, a national palace in Putrajaya
- Istana Negara, Jalan Tuanku Abdul Halim, an official residence of the King of Malaysia

== Singapore ==
- Istana Kampong Glam, former residence of the Sultan of Johor in Singapore, currently the Malay Heritage Centre
- The Istana, the official residence and office of the President of Singapore

== Elsewhere ==
- Istana Nurul Iman, an official residence of the Sultan of Brunei

== See also ==
- Kraton (Indonesia)
- The Astana (palace)
- SsangYong Istana, a van
