= Rokan Hulu Palace =

The Rokan Hulu Palace (Indonesia: Istana Rokan Hulu) is located in the regency of Rokan Hulu, Riau province, Sumatra, Indonesia.

The wooden palace is approximately two hundred years old and was constructed by the Rokan Hulu kingdom, a small kingdom of the Malayu people. It was the residence of the sultan and his family.

The building is notable not only as a relic of this lost kingdom but also due to its architecture. The palace features some outstanding examples of traditional wood-carving. It follows the traditional design of an old, Malayu 'rumah tinggi' house, with a soaring roof and a projecting porch. The palace is now protected as a national monument.
