= Kraton Kanoman =

Palace in Indonesia

- Karaton Kanoman

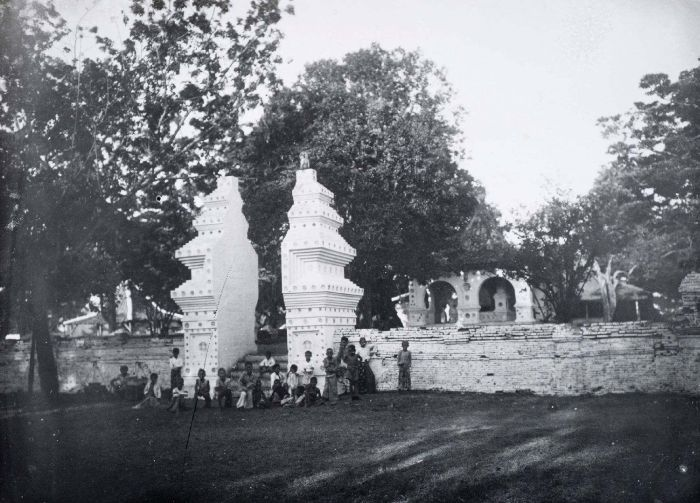
- The western gate of the Lemah Duwur complex at Kraton Kanoman (1920–1933)
- Interactive map of the Kraton Kanoman area

General information
- Type: Kraton (palace)
- Location: Jalan Kanoman 40, Lemahwungkuk, Lemahwungkuk, Cirebon, Indonesia
- Coordinates: 6.7262°S 108.5709°E
- Inaugurated: 1678 (348 years ago)

Kraton Kanoman is a palace in the Indonesian city of Cirebon in West Java. It was founded by Sultan Anom I in 1677. In the outer area of the palace, the siti inggil, are masonry versions of the classic Javanese pendopo form, as opposed to the more conventional timber structures. Like the Great Mosque in Demak, Chinese ceramics are embedded into the plastered walls. The squat split-gates with pyramidal peaks are a Cirebon emblem.

== See also ==
- Indonesian architecture
- Sultanate of Cirebon
- List of monarchs of Java
- List of palaces in Indonesia
