= Kraton (Indonesia) =

Javanese word for a royal palace

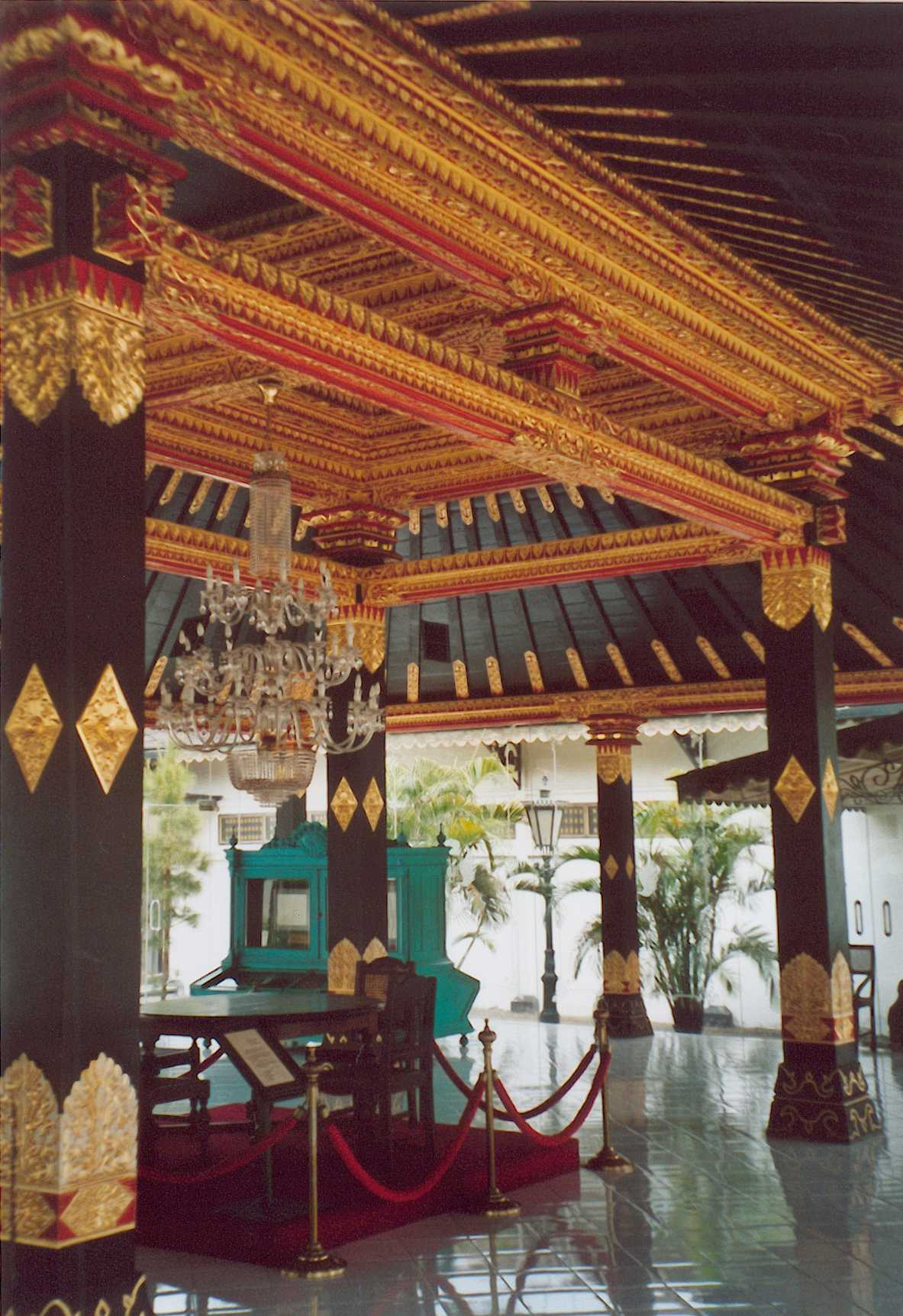
Pendhapa (pavilion) in Kraton Yogyakarta

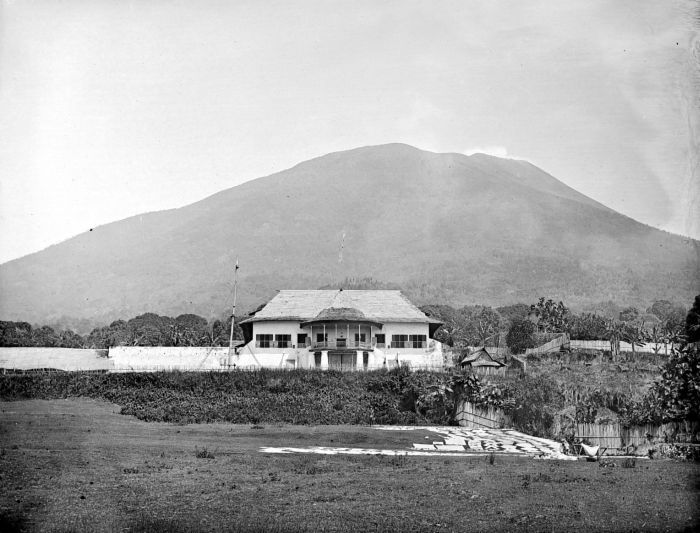
Kraton of the Sultan of Ternate

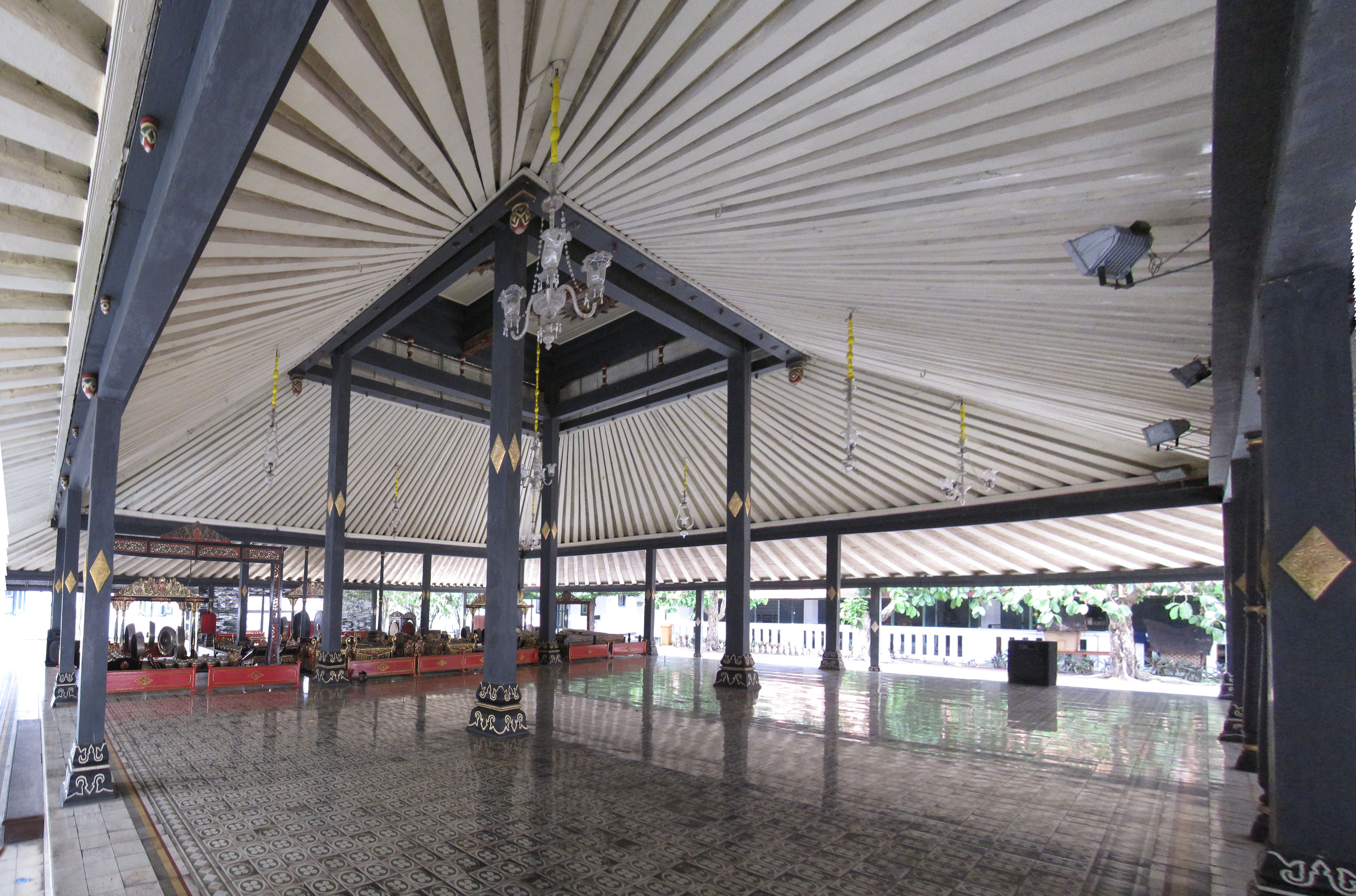
Pendhapa (pavilion) in Kraton Yogyakarta

Kraton (Javanese: ꦏꦿꦠꦺꦴꦤ꧀) or keraton is a type of royal palace in Java, Indonesia. Its name is derived from the Javanese ka-ratu-an meaning residence of the ratu, the traditional honorific title for a monarch. In Java, the palace of a prince is called pura or dalem, while the general word for palace is istana, which is identical to Malay.

== Specific palaces ==
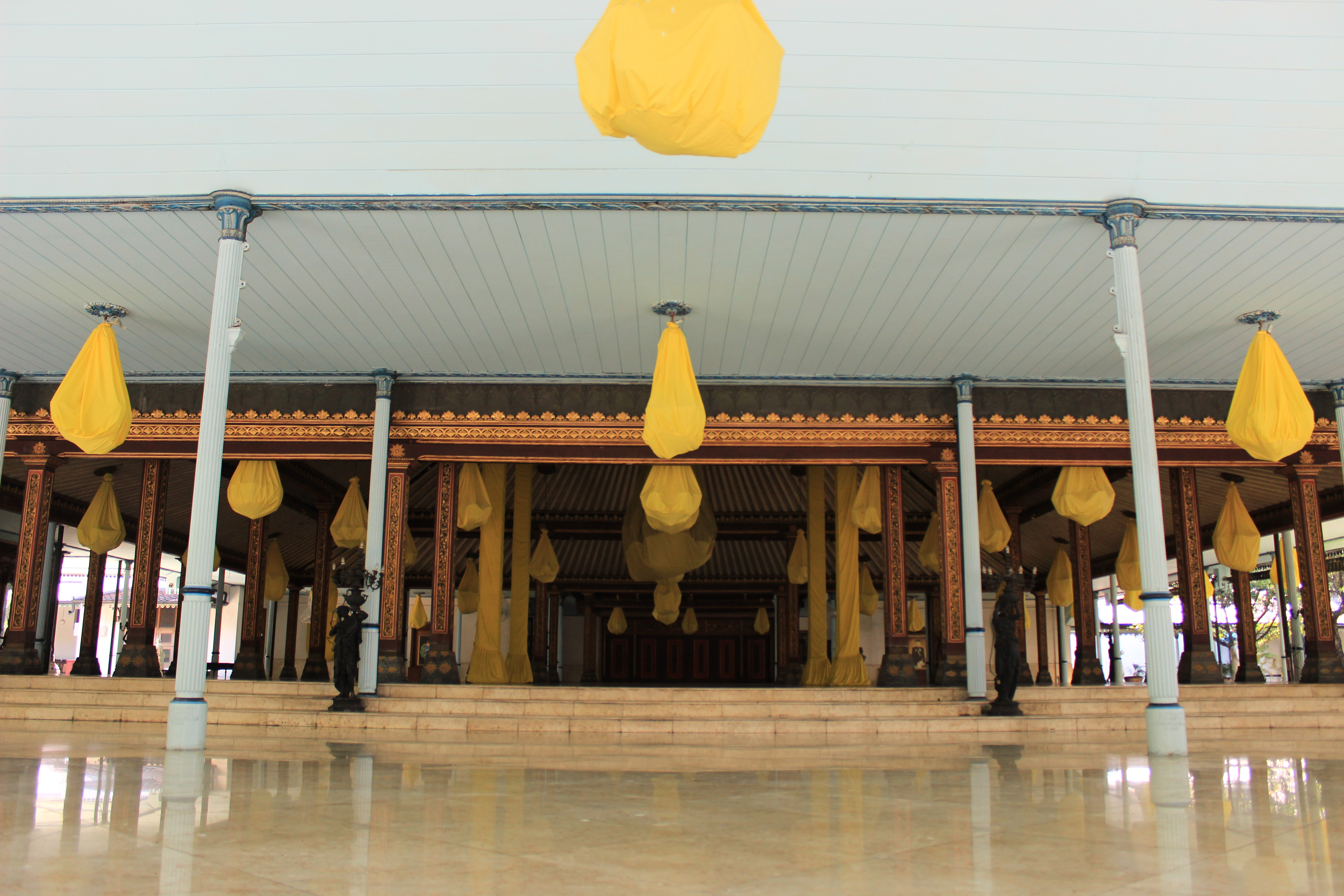
Pendhapa (pavilion) in Kraton Surakarta.

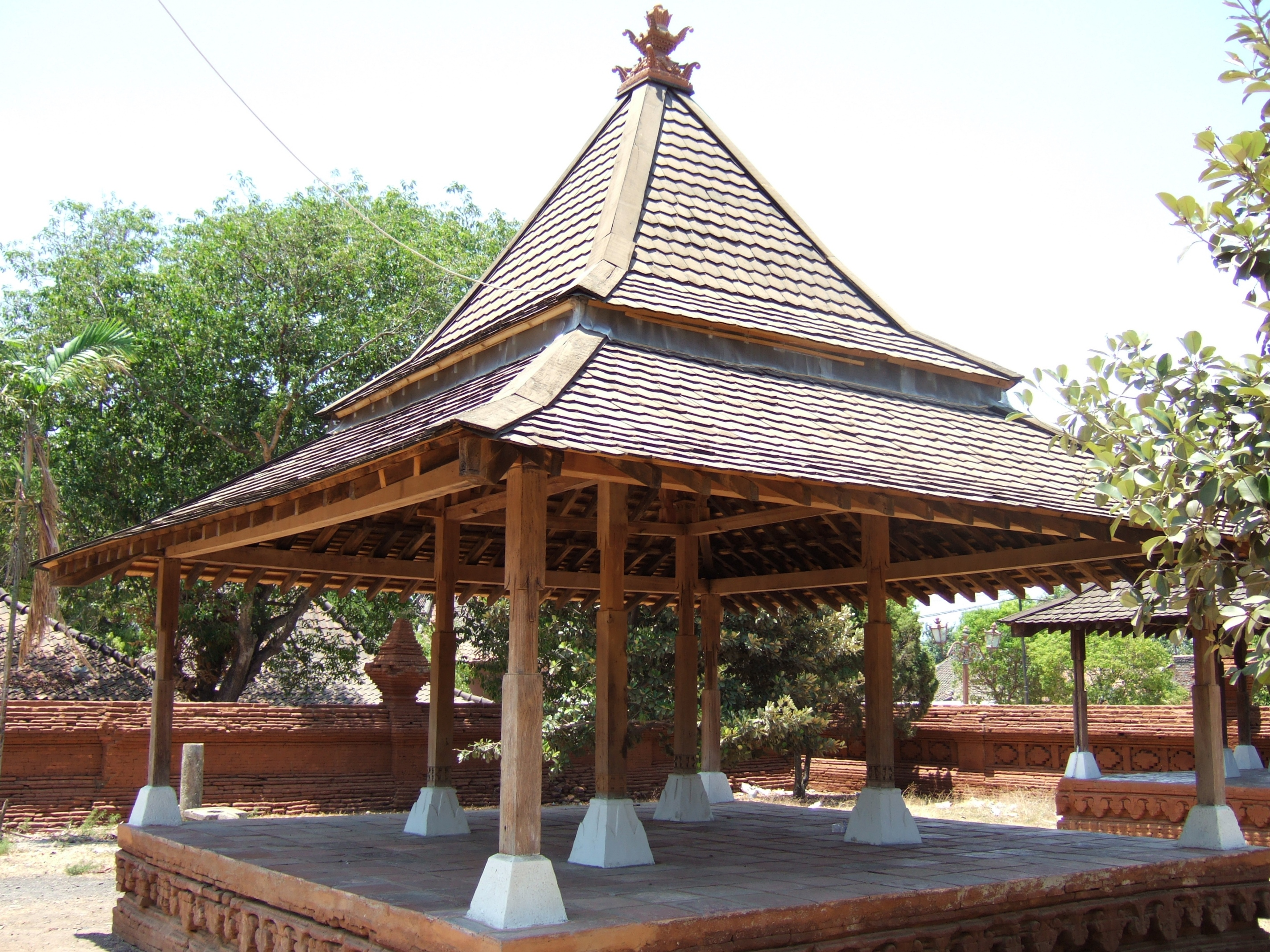
Pendhapa (pavilion) in Kraton Kasepuhan.

Kratons, or keratons, that function as the residence of a royal family include:

Yogyakarta (Jogja) region

- Kraton Ngayogyakarta Hadiningrat (Palace of Sultan Hamengkubuwono).
- Pura Pakualaman (Palace of Adipati Pakualam).

Surakarta (Solo) region

- Kraton Surakarta Hadiningrat (Palace of Susuhunan Pakubuwono).
- Pura Mangkunegaran (Palace of Adipati Mangkunegara).

Cirebon area

- Kraton Kasepuhan (Palace of Sultan Sepuh).
- Kraton Kanoman (Palace of Sultan Anom).
- Kraton Kacirebonan (Palace of Sultan Cirebon).
- Kraton Kaprabonan (id) (Palace of Sultan Prabon).

== Historical palaces ==
The locations of the former kraton have been determined by historical records or archaeological efforts. Former kraton include:

- Kraton Ratu Boko in the east of Yogyakarta, in the Prambanan area. The structure dates from the 9th century and is thought to belong to the Sailendra or Mataram Kingdom. However, local inhabitants named this site after King Boko, the legendary king in Roro Jonggrang folklore.
- Kraton of Majapahit in Trowulan, Mojokerto, the capital of the former Majapahit. Sites such as Pendopo Agung Majapahit are thought to be remnants of the Kraton of Majapahit.

In the Banten region, there are remnants of the Sultanate of Banten's palaces:

- Kraton Surosowan, Banten, the former royal palace of the Sultanate of Banten.
- Kraton Kaibon, the former palace of Queen Mother.

In the regions of Surakarta and Yogyakarta, there are remnants of the Sultanate of Mataram palaces:

- Kota Gede remains of a palace from the 16th century.
- Karta and Plered remains of palaces from the 17th century.
- Kraton Kartasura on the outskirts of Surakarta remains of palace and city wall, also dated from the 17th century.

== Metonymic use ==
The term kraton 'palace' is also used as a way to refer to the court which it houses.

This is especially the case for native Indonesian states where the succession is disputed, giving issue to two or more branches of the dynasty, or even rival dynasties, each setting up an alternative court while competing for the same state, but generally only controlling part of it.

An example is the West-Javan state of Cirebon, which was founded in 1478 and since 1662 was ruled from three Kraton (palaces):

- Kraton Kasepuhan, using as the ruler's style Sultan
- Kraton Kanoman, style Sultan
- Kraton Kacirebonan, style Sultan

== See also ==
- List of palaces
- Istana
- Cirebon
- Yogyakarta
- Surakarta
- Crown jewels for current palaces outside of Java but in Indonesia
- List of Indonesian monarchies
- Palace
