= Fatahillah =

16th-century military commander in the Sultanate of Demak

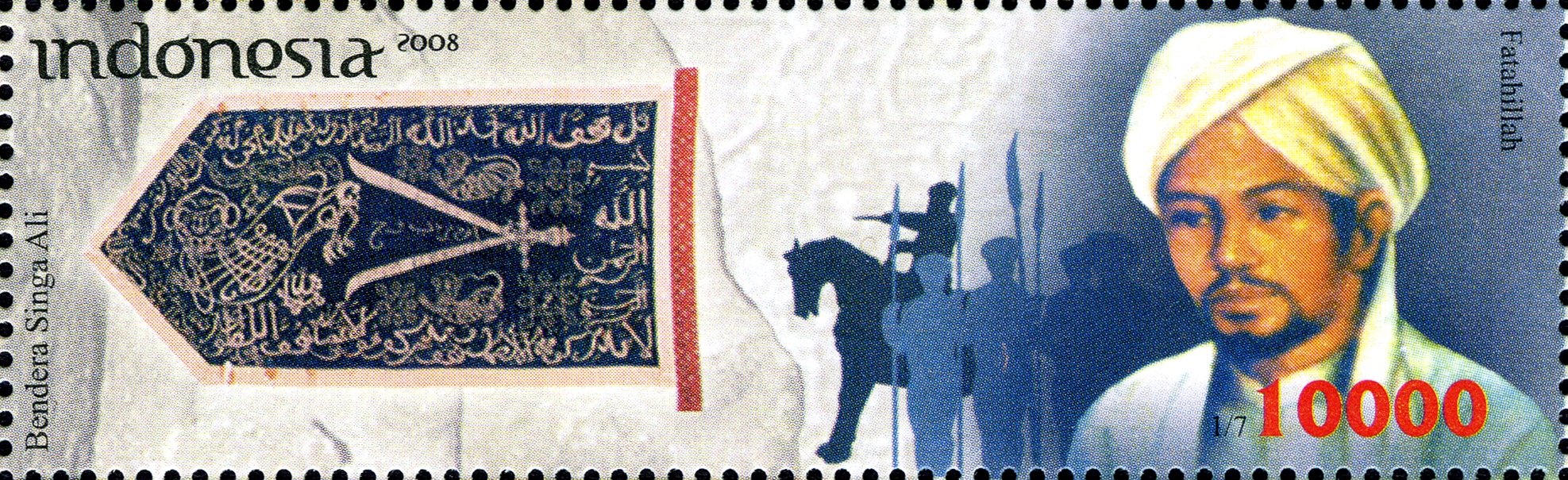
Fatahillah (right) is depicted in the 2008 Indonesian stamp.

Fatahillah, Fadhillah Khan, or Falatehan (Portuguese writing) was a commander of the Sultanate of Demak who is known for leading the conquest of Sunda Kelapa in 1527 and changing its name to Jayakarta. The conquest of Sunda Kelapa was one of his missions to spread Islam to West Java. He is widely recognized as a national hero in Indonesia.

Fatahillah Square in Jakarta and the Indonesian Navy ship KRI Fatahillah (361) were named after him.

== Family background ==
There are several opinions on the origin of Fatahillah. According to H. J. de Graaf, Fatahillah came from the Samudera Pasai Sultanate in what is now North Aceh Regency and then left the region after the Portuguese capture of Malacca in 1511. Fatahillah went to Mecca, and then to the Demak Sultanate in Java during the reign of Sultan Trenggana.

There is another theory states says Fatahillah was the son of the king of Mecca who married the royal princess of Pakuan Pajajaran, the capital of the Sunda Kingdom. Another opinion mentions his birth being in 1448 to Sultan Syarif Abdullah Maulana Huda, an Egyptian ruler of Banu Hashim descendent from Palestine, with Nyai Rara Santang, daughter of the king of Pakuan Pajajaran, Raden Manah Rasa. There are historical sources that say he was born in Central Asia, perhaps Samarqand, studied in Baghdad, and devoted himself to the Ottoman Empire, before joining the Demak Sultanate.

Later, some of Ba'alawi claimed Sunan Gunung Jati or Fatahillah as part of their Clan. This claim is debunked by the descendants of the Sunan Gunung Jati.

== Children ==
- Kiai Bagus Abdurrahman, handed down the title Kiagus - Nyayu Sultanate of Palembang Darussalam
- Kiai Mas Abdul Aziz, handed down the title of Kemas - Nyimas Palembang Darussalam Sultanate
- Ratu Darah Putih, sent down the kings of the Keratuan Darah Putih and the Keratuan Melinting Lampung
- Maulana Abdullah
- Prince Sendang Garuda

== Relationship between Sunan Gunung Jati and Fatahillah ==
Recent research shows Sunan Gunung Jati is not the same as Fatahillah. Sunan Gunung Jati is a great cleric and preacher born from generation to generation of clerics of Muhammad's grandson, Imam Husayn. Sunan Gunung Jati's real name is Syarif Hidayatullah son of Syarif Abdullah son of Nurul Alam son of Jamaluddin Akbar. Jamaluddin Akbar is a great traveler from Gujarat, India who led his sons and grandchildren to preach to Southeast Asia, with Campa (the edge of the Mekong delta, now Kampuchea) as headquarters. One of the sons of Sheikh Jamaluddin Akbar (better known as Sheikh Maulana Akbar) is Sheikh Ibrahim Akbar (father of Sunan Ampel).

Whereas Fatahillah was a Commander of Pasai, named Fadhlulah Khan, the Portuguese pronounced it as Falthehan. When Pasai and Malacca were captured by the Portuguese, he moved to Java to strengthen the fleet of Islamic sultanates in Java (Demak and Cirebon) after the death of Raden Abdul Qadir bin Yunus (Pati Unus, the son-in-law of Raden Patah the first Sultan of Demak).

== Legacy ==
In 1997, a film based on Fatahillah's life was released. Directed by Imam Tantowi and Chaerul Umam, it starred Igo Ilham in the titular role and was the most expensive Indonesian film production up to that point.
