= Kraton Kasepuhan =

Old palace in Cirebon, Java, Indonesia

- Karaton Kasepuhan ᮊᮛᮒᮧᮔ᮪ ᮊᮞᮨᮕᮥᮠᮔ᮪
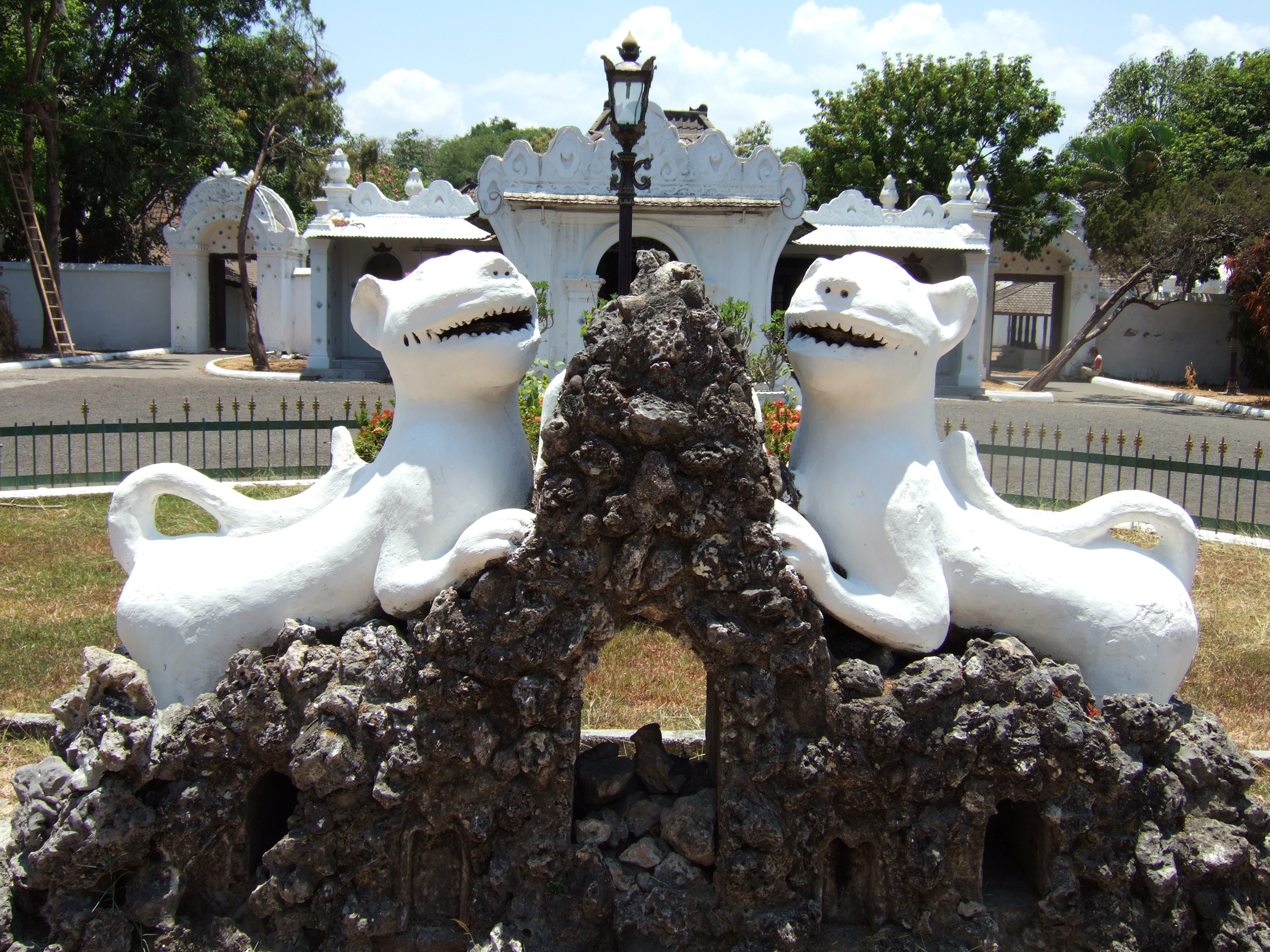
- Statues of white Javan leopards, a symbol of King Prabu Siliwangi of Pakuan Pajajaran, in the Dewandaru roundabout park in the main area of Keraton Kasepuhan
- Interactive map of the Kraton Kasepuhan area

General information
- Type: Kraton (palace)
- Location: Jalan Kasepuhan 43, Kesepuhan, Lemahwungkuk, Cirebon, Indonesia
- Coordinates: 6.7262°S 108.5709°E
- Inaugurated: 1447 (579 years ago)

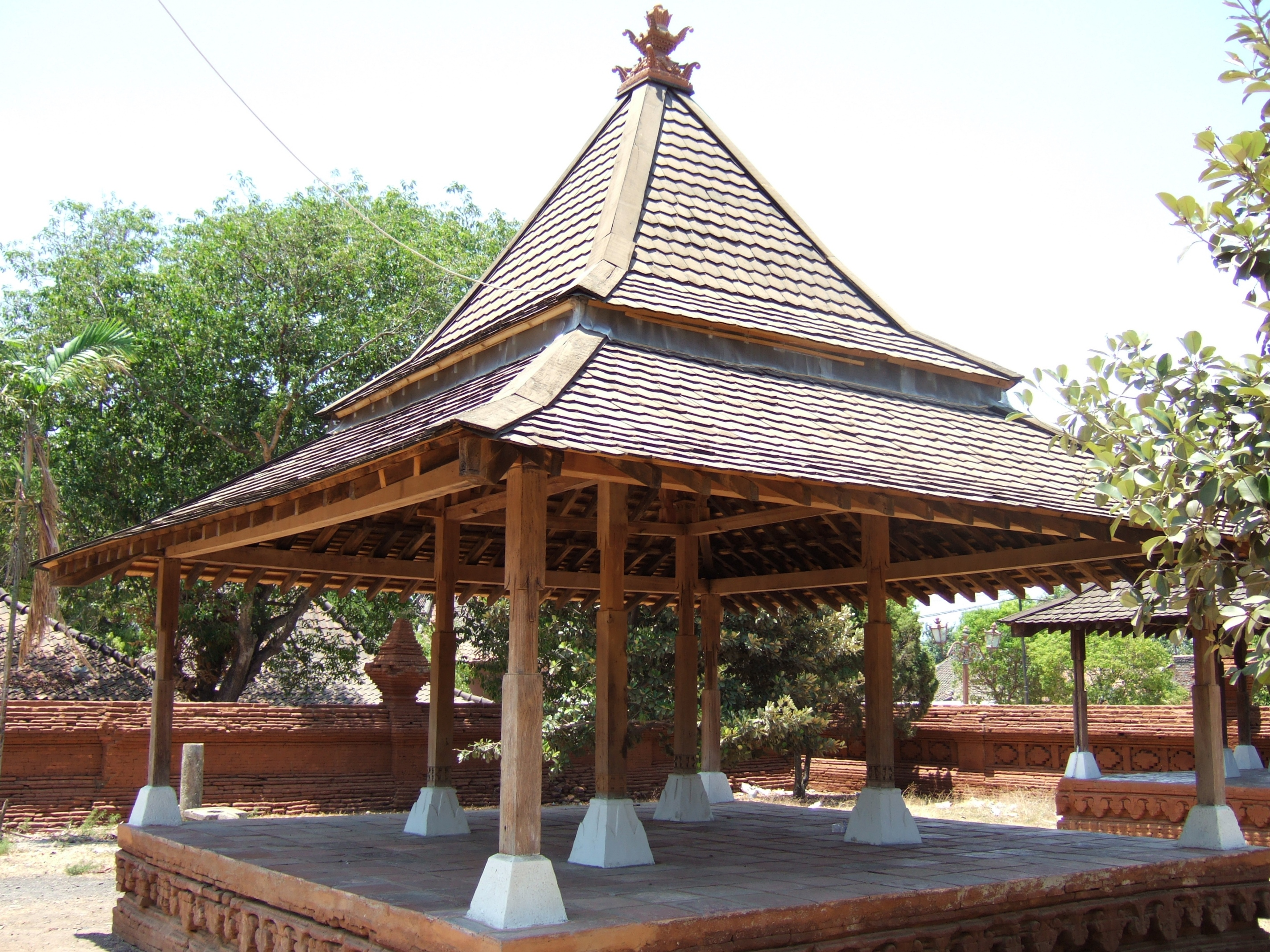
Pendopo in Kraton Kasepuhan, Cirebon

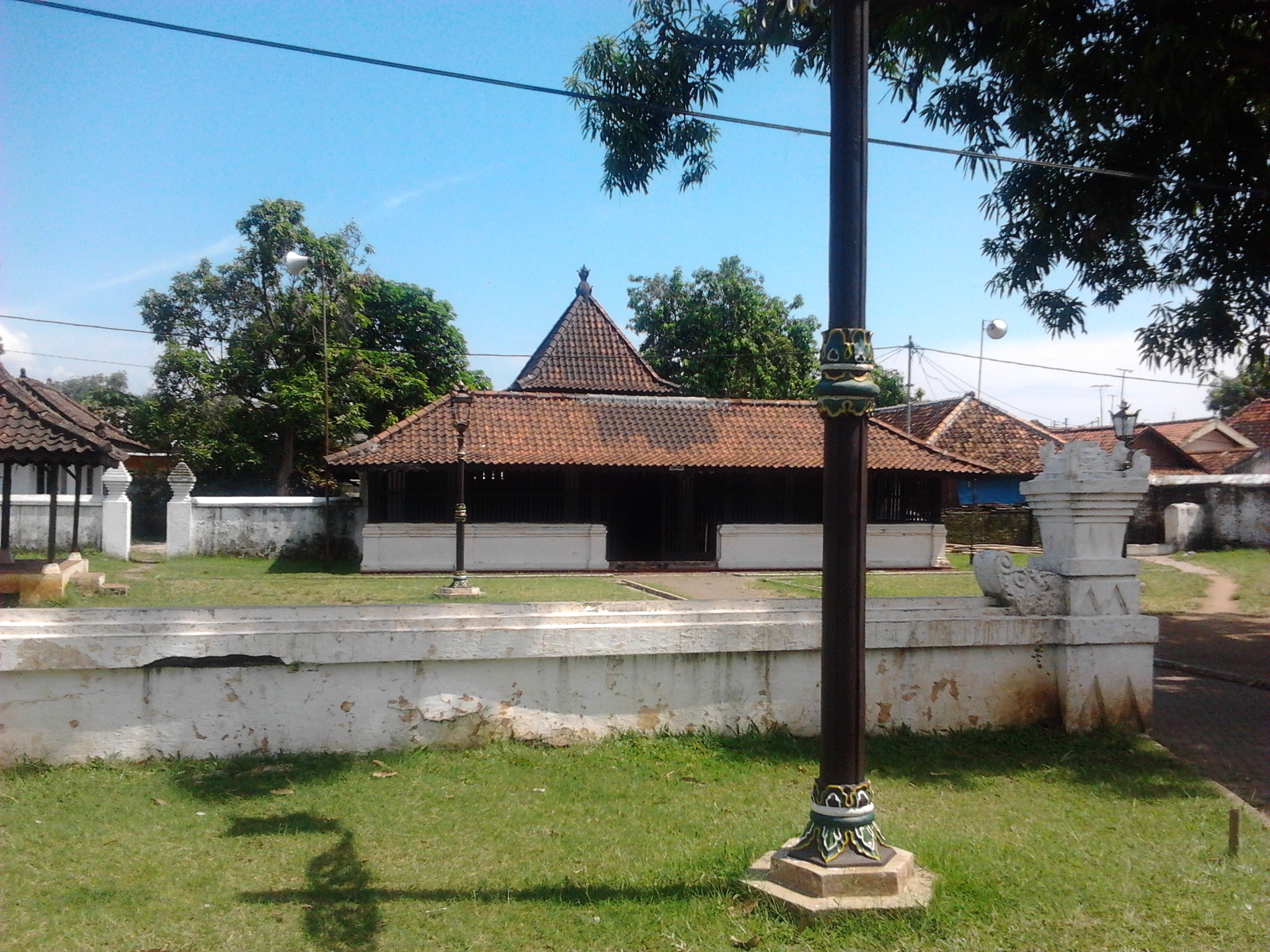
A mosque inside the complex of Kraton Kasepuhan

The Kraton Kasepuhan (Sundanese: ᮊᮛᮒᮧᮔ᮪ ᮊᮞᮨᮕᮥᮠᮔ᮪) is the oldest kraton (sultan's palace) in the Indonesian city of Cirebon. It is the residence of the Sultan of Kasepuhan and the royal palace of the Sultanate of Cirebon.

== History ==
It was built in 1447 and its architecture and interior are a blend of Sundanese, Javanese, Islamic, Chinese, and Dutch styles.

While the sultan still lives in the palace, several main sections are open to the public. Inside is a pavilion with white-washed walls dotted with blue-and-white Delft tiles, a marble floor, and a ceiling hung with French chandeliers. The legacy of Majapahit is preserved in its small pendopo on soft carved brick bases. The carvings on the pendopo columns are 1940s copies of the ancient originals. An innovation is the use of brackets branching out from the columns. The main building features unusually tall pyramidal column bases. The ornament on the double braces of this building's pendopo tumpang sari ceiling is picked out in gilt. Another unusual feature in the eclectic complex: is the plaster and masonry columns feature decoration that resembles reeding. Like other old sites around Cirebon, ceramics in walls are common here, although their use in the Kraton is more restrained.

The palace also has a somewhat neglected small museum with a restricted display of wayang, kris, cannon, furniture, Portuguese armour, and ancient royal clothes. In a separate nearby building the very elaborate Kereta Singabarong, a 17th-century gilded coach, may be seen along with a modern duplicate carriage used on official occasions.

== See also ==
- List of monarchs of Java
- Sultanate of Cirebon
