= Cikampek–Padalarang railway =

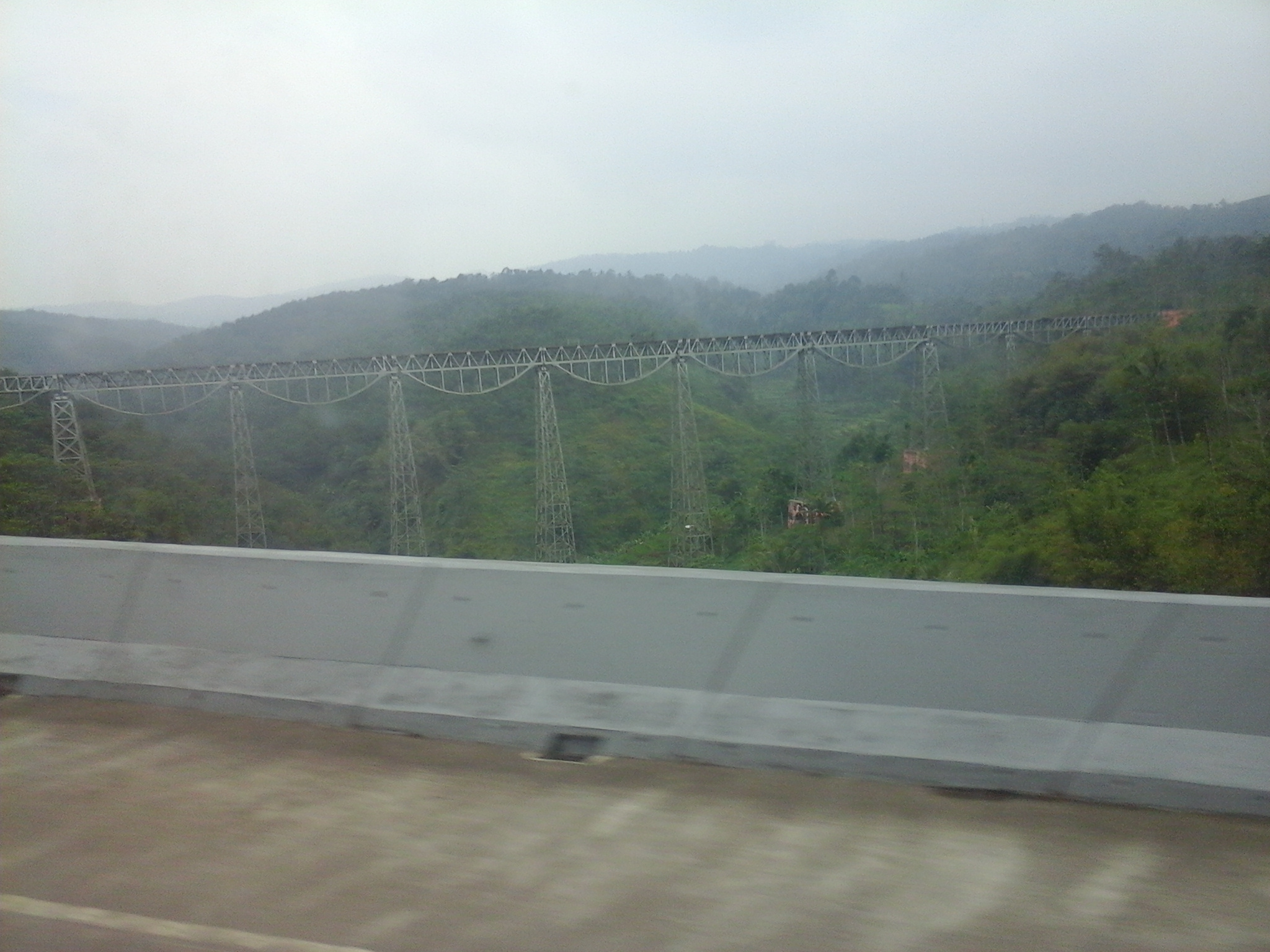
- Cikubang railway bridge viewed from the Cipularang Toll Road, 2017

Overview
- Native name: Jalur kereta api Cikampek–Padalarang
- Status: Operational
- Owner: Directorate General of Railways (DJKA)
- Locale: Cikampek-Padalarang-Bandung, West Java
- Termini: Cikampek; Padalarang
- Stations: 16

Service
- Type: Commuter rail and Inter-city rail
- Operator(s): PT Kereta Api Indonesia; PT Kereta Commuter Indonesia

History
- Opened: 1906

Technical
- Number of tracks: 2 (Cikampek-Cikadongdong); 1 (Cikadongdong-Padalarang)
- Track gauge: 1,067 mm (3 ft 6 in)
- Electrification: not available

The Cikampek–Padalarang railway (Indonesian: Jalur kereta api Cikampek–Padalarang) is a railway line in West Java, Indonesia, connecting Cikampek and Padalarang. It functions as the continuation of the Rajawali–Cikampek railway, which opened in 1893, and later formed part of the inland extension toward Bandung also part of the Jakarta–Bandung line.

The line runs entirely within West Java Province, passing through Karawang Regency, Purwakarta Regency, and West Bandung Regency. It is part of the Jakarta Kota-Cikampek-Bandung railway line.

Double track is available on several sections, including Cikampek–Purwakarta and Ciganea–Sukatani. However, significant portions toward Padalarang and Bandung remain single track due to mountainous terrain. The route includes major bridge structures and tunnels, notably the Sasaksaat Tunnel, the longest active railway tunnel in Indonesia.

== History ==
=== Development of the Karawang–Bandung segment (1898–1906) ===
As more and more people wanted to get to Bandung quickly, efforts emerged to extend the BOS line and direct it to the Preangerlijn (Bogor–Padalarang–Kasugihan railway line). A concession was accepted by the then Minister of Dutch East Indies Colonial Affairs, Jacob Theodoor Cremer. At that time, Cremer had also signed an agreement to acquire the Batavia–Karawang line from BOS, while also paying off debts to the General Workers Union. The acquisition was legalized in Staatsblad No. 222 on 9 June 1898. With a purchase price of ƒ3,900,000, the Dutch East Indies became the owner of the infrastructure that would be extended to Padalarang. This acquisition was finally completed on 4 August 1898. After the acquisition was completed, SS developed this line. Two new lines were built, namely from Batavia BOS Station to Tanjung Priok, as well as the line to Anyer Kidul, so that Batavia BOS was no longer considered a terminus. The continuation of the line itself was extended by SS to Cikampek and Purwakarta, with its inauguration taking place on 27 December 1902. It then continued through the mountains, until finally reaching Padalarang on 2 May 1906. This was done in order to cut Jakarta-Bandung travel times.

After extending the line to Purwakarta, on 1 March 1904 the Kemayoran–Ancol–Tanjung Priok line was also completed. Next, this line then connected to Meester Cornelis, so that this line was seen as similar to a double track, but in fact it was a pair of single tracks whose task was to separate trains heading to Batavia and those heading to Tanjung Priok. SS also rebuilt Pasar Senen and Kemayoran, and these projects disbursed funds of ƒ350,000.

=== Cikampek-Padalarang double track ===
This double-track project is part of a capacity increase on the Cikampek–Bandung route. Currently, the sections of this route that have been double-tracked are Cikampek–Purwakarta, Ciganea–Sukatani, and Plered–Cikadongdong. Due to a mountain route, the Ciganea–Sukatani double-track railway also cuts through the landslide-prone hills in the Ciganea area, shifting the railway line from a winding, hilly track to a straighter one and crossing a new concrete bridge. This bridge is now known as the Cisuren railway bridge. On 3 December 2004, President of the Republic of Indonesia Megawati Soekarnoputri inaugurated the Cisomang railway bridge.

== Service ==
Here is a train that passes along the Cikampek-Padalarang railway line:

Southern railway Service

- Parahyangan between Gambir–Bandung
- Cikuray between Pasar Senen–Kiaracondong–Garut
- Papandayan between Gambir–Bandung–Garut
- Pangandaran between Gambir–Bandung–Banjar
- Serayu between Pasar Senen–Kiaracondong–Purwokerto

Northern railway service

- Ciremai between Bandung–Semarang Tawang
- Harina between Bandung–Surabaya Pasarturi

Commuter Line

- Greater Bandung Commuter Line
- Garut Commuter Line
- Jatiluhur and Walahar Commuter Line

== See also ==
- Rajawali–Cikampek railway
- Padalarang–Kasugihan railway

== Bibliography ==
- de Bruyn Kops, A.L. (1940). "De Ringbaan in en om Batavia". Spoor- en Tramwegen (in Dutch). 13 (22): 435–439.
