= Cikubang railway bridge =

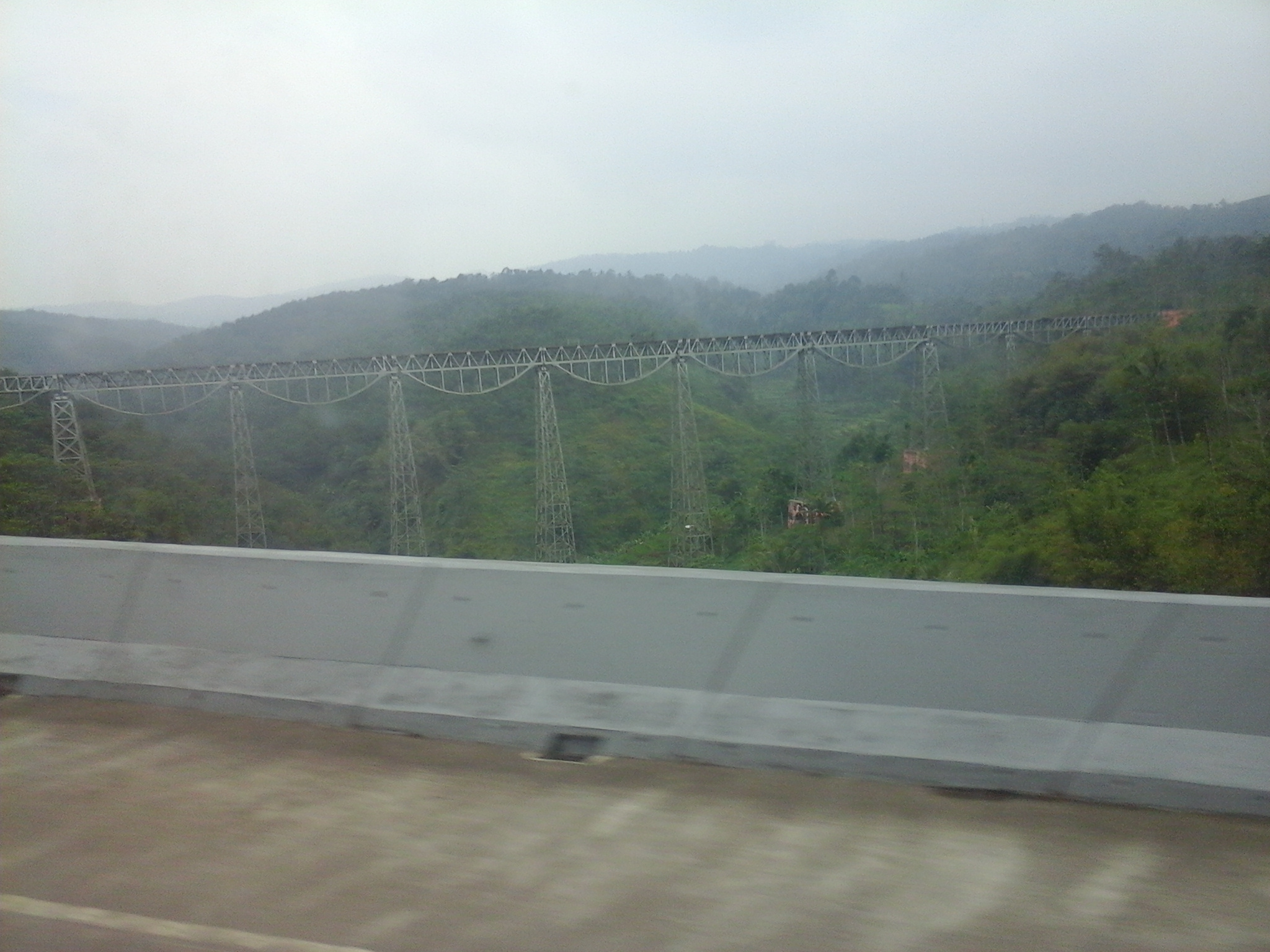
- Cikubang railway bridge viewed from the Cipularang Toll Road, 2017
- Coordinates: 6°46′48″S 107°26′31″E
- Crosses: Cikampek–Padalarang
- Locale: Cipatat, West Bandung Regency, West Java
- Begins: Sasaksaat
- Ends: Cilame

Characteristics
- Total length: 300 meters
- Height: 80 meters

Rail characteristics
- Track gauge: 1067 mm

History
- Built: 1903
- Opened: 1906
- Rebuilt: 1953 (bridge reinforcement)

Location
- Interactive map of Cikubang railway bridge

Cikubang railway bridge is an railway bridge that linked between Jakarta & Bandung along with the Cipularang Toll Road since 2005 that located in Cipatat, West Bandung Regency, West Java. The bridge has four steel pillars weighing around 110 tons. Now, the Cikubang railway bridge operator by Kereta Api Indonesia & KAI Commuter.

For the difference along with the Cikubang Toll Road Bridge, left of the Cikubang railway bridge heading to Jakarta from Bandung, while right of the Cikubang railway bridge heading to Bandung from Jakarta.

The railway bridge as the 2nd longest railway in Indonesia after Serayu Maos railway bridge near Maos in Cilacap Regency, Central Java, and the longest railway bridge in Jakarta–Bandung line that passed at Parahyangan for Cikampek and Bandung.

== History ==
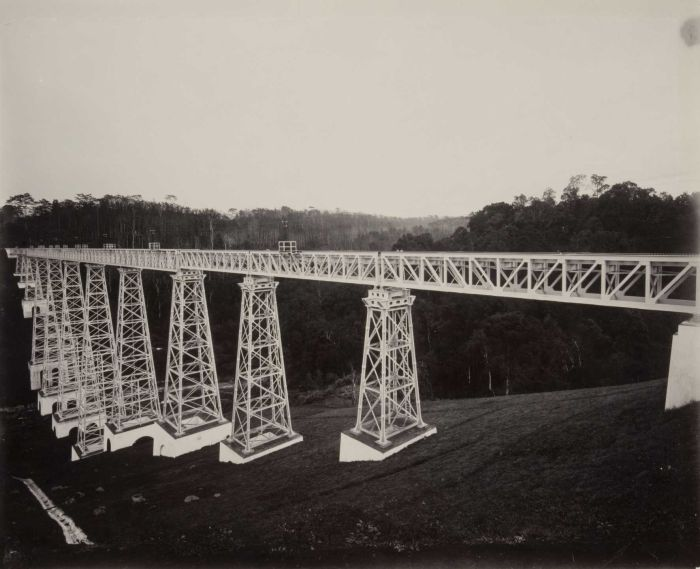
ca. 1900-1910

The Cikubang railway bridge has been in use since 1906 and still stands strong for present, standing 80 meters above the Cikubang River. The construction of this railway bridge is related to the construction of the Cikubang, Karawang-Purwakarta-Bandung City railway line, which began between 1881 and 1884 by the Staatsspoorwegen (SS) railway company.

The bridge structure was further reinforced with semicircular metal arches along the rails at the bottom of the sleepers in 1953. This reinforcement coincided with the introduction of diesel locomotives. The Cikubang railway bridge is clearly visible from the highway between Plered and Padalarang, and tourists often stop to watch the trains passing over it.

The Cikubang railway bridge isn't as the longest railway bridge in Indonesia, instead the Cikubang railway bridge itself as the 2nd longest railway bridge in Indonesia after the Serayu Maos railway bridge (BH 1549) which stretches over the Serayu River, precisely at km 388+850 of the road section between Kasugihan–Maos, Maos with a span of 380 meters, and began to be used in 2018.

== Technical data ==
BH 513
Railway Bridge Name	Cikubang
River Name	Cikubang
Built	1903
Strengthening	1953
Location	KM 109/110 (Cipularang Toll Road)

== Service ==
Here is a train that crossing the Cikubang Railway Bridge:

Southern railway Service

- Parahyangan between Gambir–Bandung
- Cikuray between Pasar Senen–Kiaracondong–Garut
- Papandayan between Gambir–Bandung–Garut
- Pangandaran between Gambir–Bandung–Banjar
- Serayu between Pasar Senen–Kiaracondong–Purwokerto

Northern railway service

- Ciremai between Bandung–Semarang Tawang
- Harina between Bandung–Surabaya Pasarturi

Commuter Line

- Greater Bandung Commuter Line & Garut Commuter Line
