= Cisomang railway bridge =

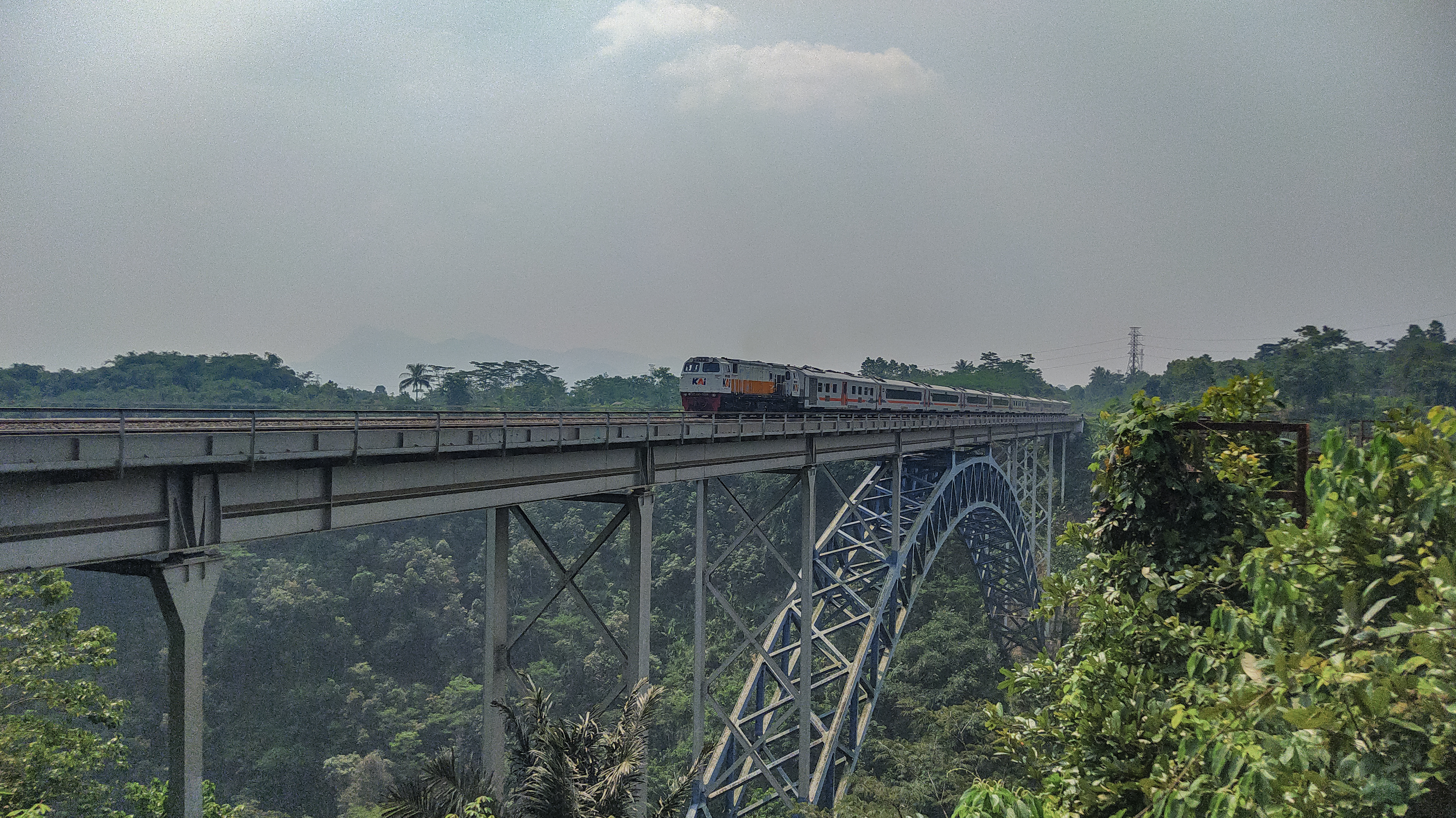
- Ciremai passing the Cisomang railway bridge, 2024
- Crosses: Jakarta - Cikampek - Bandung railway line
- Locale: Darangdan, Purwakarta Regency, West Java
- Begins: Cisomang
- Ends: Cikadongdong

Characteristics
- Height: 100 meters

Rail characteristics
- Track gauge: 1067 mm

History
- Built: 1894
- Opened: 1906 (Generation 1), 1932 (Generation 2)
- Rebuilt: 2004 (Generation 3)

Cisomang railway bridge is an railway bridge that linked between Jakarta & Bandung that located in the West Cisomang village, that border between the district of Darangdan, Purwakarta Regency & West Bandung Regency, West Java. The Cisomang railway bridge used to connect the railway line from Bandung to Jakarta, the Cisomang railway bridge is the highest railway bridge in Indonesia and is still in active use, and consists of 3 generations.

It's now difficult to find traces of the first generation of the Cisomang railway bridge, that only the foundations remain. The second generation of the Cisomang railway bridge is a steel bridge that was used since the Dutch era as a replacement for the first generation bridge, until 2004. The third generation of the Cisomang railway bridge is a bridge with a Double-track railway that is currently used.

== History ==
=== Cisomang railway bridge (Gen.1) ===
The Cisomang railway bridge was the first bridge built during the Dutch East Indies colonial era and began operating in 1906, like other bridges on the Cikampek–Padalarang railway line. The first-generation of the Cisomang railway bridge was only used for a few years due to unstable surrounding soil, which frequently caused trains to derail. Since 1932, the bridge has been discontinued, with only its foundations remaining. The remains of the bridge are currently difficult to find due to its distance from the two newer Cisomang railway bridges.

=== Cisomang railway bridge (Gen.2) ===
Built in 1932, the second-generation of the Cisomang railway bridge is 230 meters long and rises almost 100 meters above the Cisomang Riverbed. The old Cisomang railway bridge is characterized by towering steel pillars with concrete foundations embedded more than 3 meters deep in the ground. This bridge was used for a long time, from the Dutch colonial era until the post-independence period of Indonesia. The Parahyangan and Argo Gede, inaugurated in 1971 and 1995, also passed over the Cisomang railway bridge.

Because the second-generation Cisomang railway bridge couldn't be double-tracked, construction began on a new Cisomang railway bridge in 2000, which was completed in 2004. This bridge was replaced by the new, third-generation Cisomang Bridge, which was designed to be double-tracked. After the bridge was decommissioned, its rails and sleepers were removed.

Several years after the bridge was decommissioned, its frame was painted red (except for the pillars, which remained gray). To this day, the old Cisomang railway bridge still stands alongside the new Cisomang railway bridge.

=== Cisomang railway bridge (Gen.3) ===
The new 243-meter Cisomang railway bridge was built by railway bridge construction experts from Voesp MCE (Austria) from 2000 to 2004. The Cisomang railway bridge uses a steel frame construction that curves upwards, and has a small road on the edge of the rails that can be used by Motorcycle and Walker. The new Cisomang railway bridge has also been prepared for double-track railway between Cisomang Station and Cikadongdong Station, although the double-track section only became operational in 2014. For 10 years, from 2004 to 2014, the route from Cisomang Station to the Cisomang railway bridge was a single-track line, using the previous track to the old bridge. Meanwhile, from the new Cisomang railway bridge to Cikadongdong Station and vice versa, one of the two tracks that had been built was used.

The new Cisomang railway bridge was inaugurated by the President of the Republic of Indonesia, Megawati Soekarnoputri, on 3 August 2004. However, the bridge had already been used as a trial run several months before its inauguration. The new Cisomang railway bridge replaces the old Cisomang Bridge (2nd generation), which is over 100 years old.

== Incident ==
- On 30 May 2014, the Argo Parahyangan derailed at the end of the Cisomang Bridge, two train units derailed and 1 unit of the CC 203 series locomotive almost fell into the bottom of the ravine. As a result, train travel was hampered, although not significantly. The Argo Parahyangan derailed because it entered a double track that was not yet connected to the new Cisomang Bridge (at that time, the rail to the new Cisomang Bridge was still a single track and was a connection from the old rail that previously went to the old Cisomang railway bridge). Since then, the double track between Cisomang Station and Cikadongdong Station has been activated, making the old single track between Cisomang Station and Cisomang railway bridge no longer used.

== Geography ==
The Cisomang Railway Bridge connects Jakarta and Bandung, spanning the Cisomang River in West Cisomang village, on the border of Purwakarta Regency and West Bandung Regency. It is Indonesia’s highest railway bridge, and evolved over three generations. Few traces remain of the first-generation bridge. The second-generation steel bridge was used from 1932 to 2004. The third-generation bridge, a double-track structure, operates today.

== History ==
=== 1st generation ===
Built during the Dutch East Indies era, the first bridge opened in 1906 along the Cikampek–Padalarang railway. Unstable soil caused frequent derailments, leading to its closure in 1932.

=== 2nd generation ===
Constructed in 1932, the second-generation bridge was 230 meters long, nearly 100 meters above the Cisomang riverbed. It features steel pillars with concrete foundations embedded over 3 meters deep. It served from the Dutch colonial period through Indonesia’s post-independence era, accommodating trains such as the Parahyangan and Argo Gede, launched in 1971 and 1995. It was unable to support double-tracking. After decommissioning, its rails and sleepers were removed, and the frame was painted red, except for the gray pillars. It stands beside its replacement

=== 3rd generation ===
Built from 2000 to 2004 by Voest MCE of Austria, the 243-meter third-generation bridge features a curved steel frame with a small path for motorcycles and pedestrians. Designed for double-tracking between Cisomang and Cikadongdong stations, it operated as a single-track line from 2004 to 2014, using the old bridge’s track for part of the route. The double-track section became fully operational in 2014.

== Incident ==
On 30 May 2014, the Argo Parahyangan derailed at the bridge’s end when two train units and a CC 203 locomotive veered off an unconnected double track. The locomotive nearly fell into the ravine, causing minor disruptions. The incident occurred because the train used the old single track to reach the second-generation bridge. Afterward, the double track between Cisomang and Cikadongdong stations was activated, rendering the old single track obsolete.

== Service ==
Here is a train that crossing the Cisomang Railway Bridge:

Southern railway Service

- Parahyangan between Gambir–Bandung
- Cikuray between Pasar Senen–Kiaracondong–Garut
- Papandayan between Gambir–Bandung–Garut
- Pangandaran between Gambir–Bandung–Banjar
- Serayu between Pasar Senen–Kiaracondong–Purwokerto

Northern railway service

- Ciremai between Bandung–Semarang Tawang
- Harina between Bandung–Surabaya Pasarturi

Commuter Line

- Greater Bandung Commuter Line & Garut Commuter Line
