= Sasaksaat railway tunnel =

Cidepong hills, West Java

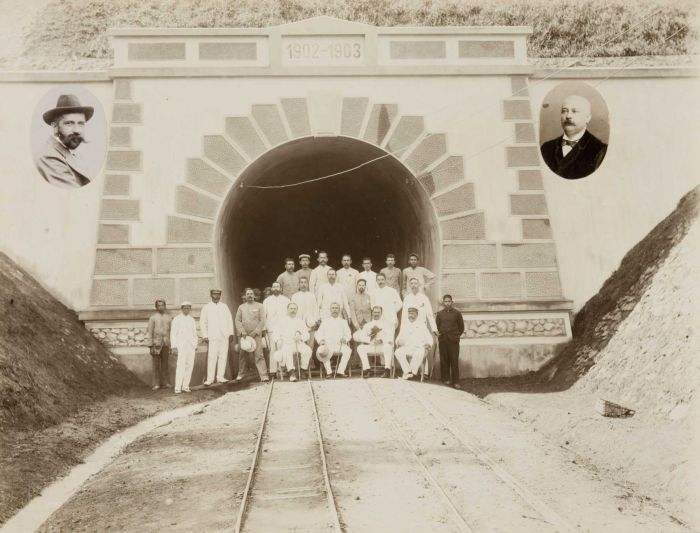
- Group portrait of the builders of the railway subway at Sasaksaät
- Interactive map of Sasaksaat railway tunnel

Overview
- Location: Sasaksaat, West Bandung Regency, West Java
- Status: active
- Route: Jakarta - Bandung
- Crosses: Cikampek–Padalarang
- Start: Maswati
- End: Sasaksaat
- No. of stations: Sasaksaat railway station

Operation
- Constructed: 1902
- Opens: 1903
- Owner: Kereta Api Indonesia

Technical
- Length: 959 m (3,146 ft)
- Track gauge: 1067 mm

Sasaksaat railway tunnel is an railway tunnel that built by the Staatsspoorwegen (SS) between 1902 and 1903. The railway tunnel with the building wisdom number (BH) 503 is located on the route between Jakarta and Bandung at km 143+144 between Sasaksaat and Maswati Station, cutting through the Cidepong hills in Sasaksaat Village, Cipatat, West Bandung Regency, West Java.

Before the opening of the KCJB high-speed train line where one of the railway tunnels reaches the length of around 4.4 km (HSR Tunnel 6) on 2 October 2023, this tunnel was the longest active railway tunnel in Jakarta–Bandung line and Indonesia. 2nd longest after the inactive since 1980s Wilhelmina railway tunnel. In the tunnel with a length of 949 m there are 35 sleko consisting of 17 left and 18 right from the direction of the Sasaksaat Station.

== Geography ==
The railway tunnel located in Operation Area II Bandung is a train tunnel with heavy traffic. The curved track when entering the tunnel from both the Sasaksaat and Maswati Station directions, the rails are given forced rails (gongsol). The large number of trains passing through requires special security in the tunnel so that at both ends of the tunnel there are guard posts for PJTW (tunnel guard officers). The architecture of this tunnel is similar at first glance to the Mrawan railway tunnel in Sidomulyo, Silo, Jember.

== Technical Data ==
BH 503
length	949 m
Built	1902-1903
Located	km 143+144 between Sasaksaat & Maswati

== Service ==
Here is a train that entering the Sasaksaat railway tunnel:

Southern railway Service

- Parahyangan between Gambir–Bandung
- Cikuray between Pasar Senen–Kiaracondong–Garut
- Papandayan between Gambir–Bandung–Garut
- Pangandaran between Gambir–Bandung–Banjar
- Serayu between Pasar Senen–Kiaracondong–Purwokerto

Northern railway service

- Ciremai between Bandung–Semarang Tawang
- Harina between Bandung–Surabaya Pasarturi

Commuter Line

- Greater Bandung Commuter Line & Garut Commuter Line
