= Karawang =

Karawang Karawang/Krawang/Karawaan
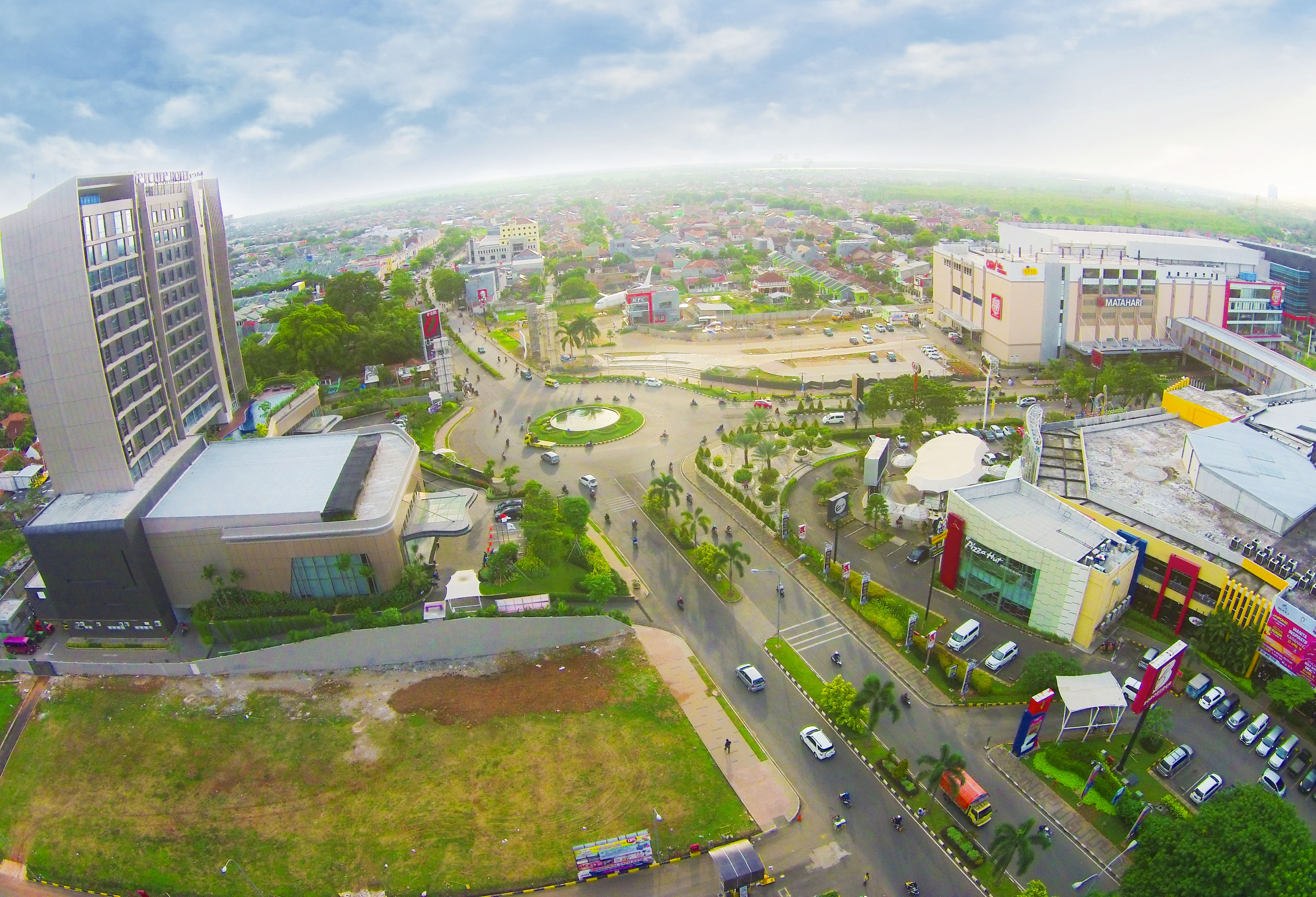
- Galuh mas district In karawang City
- Motto: Karawang Interasih
- Location within Indonesia
- Coordinates: 6°18′0″S 107°0′0″E
- Country: Indonesia
- Province: West Java

Government
  - Mayor: Aep Syaepuloh

Area
  - Total: 63.45 km^{2} (24.50 sq mi)

Population (2020 Census)
  - Total: 307,880
  - Density: 4,852/km^{2} (12,570/sq mi)
- Time zone: UTC+7 (WIB)
- ZIP Code: 41313

Karawang (Kota Karawang or Karawang Kota) is the capital of the Karawang Regency of West Java, Indonesia. It is 32 miles east of Jakarta, and had a population of 307,880 at the 2020 Census, spread over two districts of the regency - West Karawang and East Karawang.

Karawang is known as a major rice production source in West Java.

Karawang is also known for automobile manufacturing facilities, including Honda Prospect Motor and Toyota Motor Manufacturing Indonesia. Mitsubishi Motors Indonesia also operated a plant here from 1988 until 2015. In June 2025, CATL's subsidiary Brunp, together with PT Aneka Tambang (ANTAM) and Indonesia Battery Corporation (IBC), began construction of a battery manufacturing facility in Karawang as part of an integrated battery project with a planned investment of nearly US$6 billion across Indonesia. The Karawang plant was planned to have an initial annual production capacity of 6.9 GWh, with a potential expansion to 15 GWh.

== History ==
In March 2010 Karawang suffered severe flooding with 10,747 houses flooded; 11,540 families and 44,071 people were affected.

Heinrich Christian Macklot, a German naturalist, was killed on 12 May 1832 during an insurrection that took place on the island.

== Toll road access ==
KM	Toll Road	Toll Gate	Destination
47	Jakarta–Cikampek Toll Road	Karawang Barat	Karawang, Industrial Complex, Rengasdengklok
54	Jakarta–Cikampek Toll Road	Karawang Timur	Karawang, Klari, Industrial complex

== See also ==
- San Diego Hills, a cemetery in West Karawang
