= Cellica Nurrachadiana =

Indonesian politician (born 1980)

dr Cellica Nurrachadiana
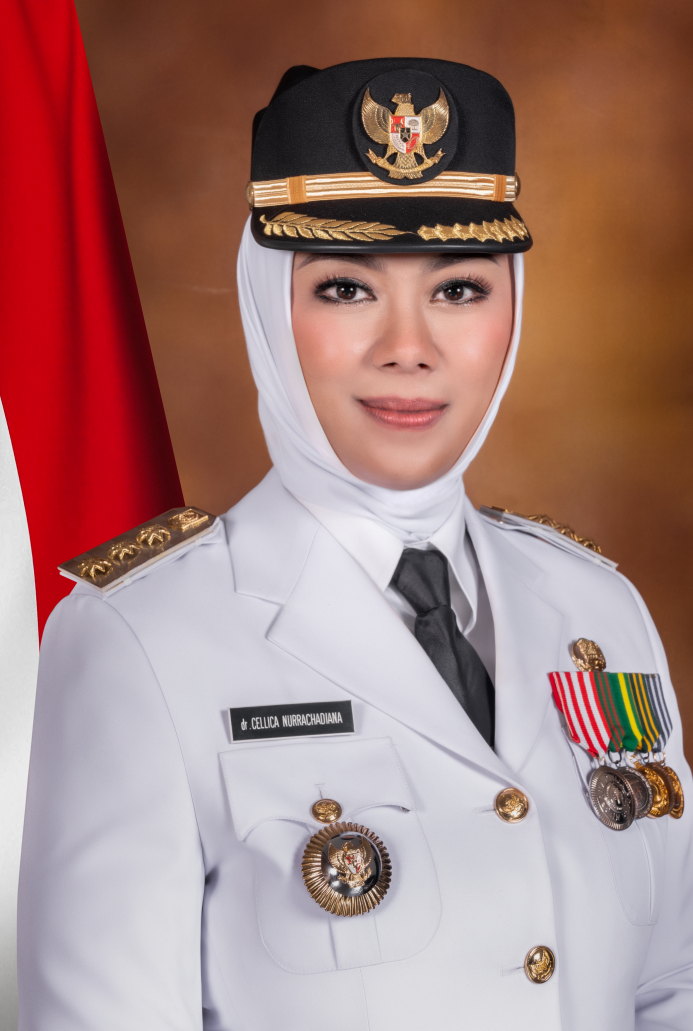

Regent of Karawang
- In office 17 February 2016 – 3 November 2023; Acting: 24 December 2014 – 27 December 2015
- Governor: Ahmad Heryawan; Ridwan Kamil
- Preceded by: Ade Swara
- Succeeded by: Aep Syaepuloh

Deputy Regent of Karawang
- In office 27 December 2010 – 24 December 2014
- Regent: Ade Swara
- Succeeded by: Ahmad Zamaksyari

Member of West Java DPRD
- In office 31 August 2009 – 27 June 2011

Personal details
- Born: 18 July 1980 (age 44); Bandung, West Java
- Political party: Demokrat

Cellica Nurrachadiana (born 18 July 1980) is an Indonesian politician and doctor who is the regent of Karawang Regency from 2016 to 2023.

First holding political office in 2009 as a provincial councillor, she became deputy regent the following year, and was acting regent by 2014. She was reelected in 2015, and in 2020. She resigned before the expiry of her tenure in November 2023 in order to run as a legislative candidate in the 2024 election, and won a seat in the House of Representatives.

== Background ==
Nurrachadiana was born in Bandung on 18 July 1980. After completing high school in Bandung, she earned a bachelor's degree in medicine from Maranatha Christian University and a master's degree in health law from Soegijapranata Catholic University.

Nurrachadiana is divorced with one child. According to her, her name was based on the Toyota Celica car, which her parents bought in the year of her birth.

== Career ==
Before holding political office, Nurrachadiana served as director in several companies. She also featured in the 2011 film Surat Kecil Untuk Tuhan, taking on a minor role as a doctor treating the main character.

=== Politics ===
After being elected to the West Java Provincial Council in the 2009 election, Nurrachadiana was sworn in on 31 August 2009.

In 2010 local election, Nurrachadiana ran as a running mate to Ade Swara and won, securing 38.8% of the votes in a five-way race and defeating incumbent Sonny Gersona. They were sworn in on 27 December 2010, although Nurrachadiana's replacement in the council was not appointed until June the following year. When she was sworn in at the age of 30, she received an award from the Indonesian World Records Museum for being the youngest female vice-regent.

After Ade was arrested and charged for corruption and money laundering, Nurrachadiana was made acting regent on 24 December 2014, and remained so until the end of her term in December 2015. In the 2015 local election, she secured a slim majority (51.06%, 533,240 votes) in the six-candidate race with Ahmad Zamaksyari as running mate. She was officially sworn in by governor Ahmad Heryawan on 17 February 2016.

As regent, Nurrachadiana promoted vertical housing in the regency in order to reduce land use, with agricultural land already pressured by the expansion of industry. In 2018, she and her deputy entered a spat over the reassignment of hundreds of regency officials, with the latter declaring an intent to run against her in the 2021 local election.

During a book launch in March 2016, Nurrachadiana gave a speech which resulted in the leader of the local branch of the Islamic Defenders Front threatening to kidnap her. The issue was later clarified and resolved as an error by a local media in quoting her.

She tested positive for coronavirus disease 2019 during the 2020 pandemic, and was quarantined in a hospital.

She was reelected for a second term in 2020, with Aep Syaepuloh as her new vice regent. She resigned from her position, effective on 3 November 2023, in order to run as a candidate to the House of Representatives in the 2024 Indonesian legislative election. She was elected from West Java's 7th district (Karawang, Bekasi Regency and Purwakarta Regency) as a Demokrat member.
