= 2024 Karawang regency election =

Local election in Indonesia

- 27 November 2024
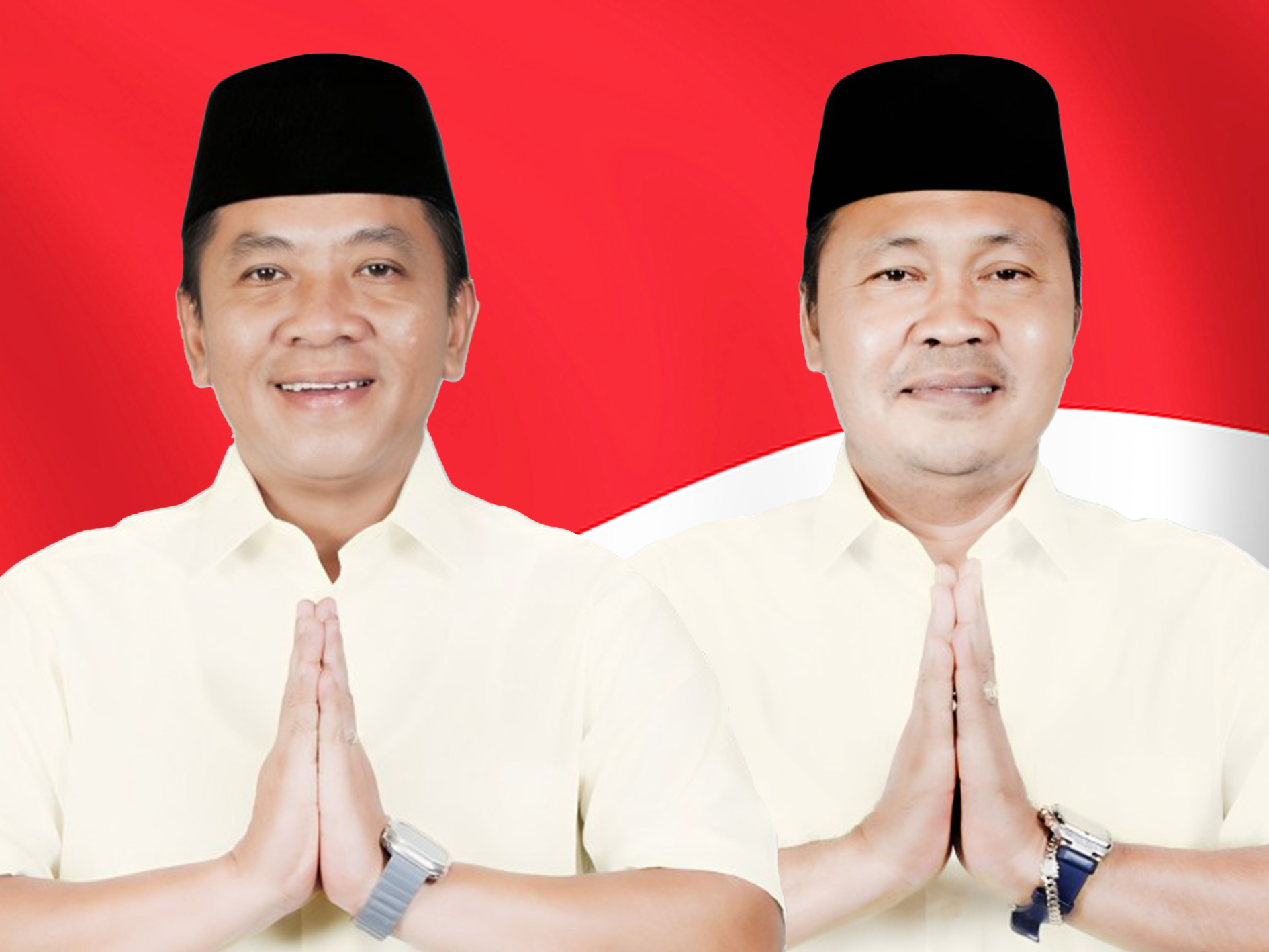

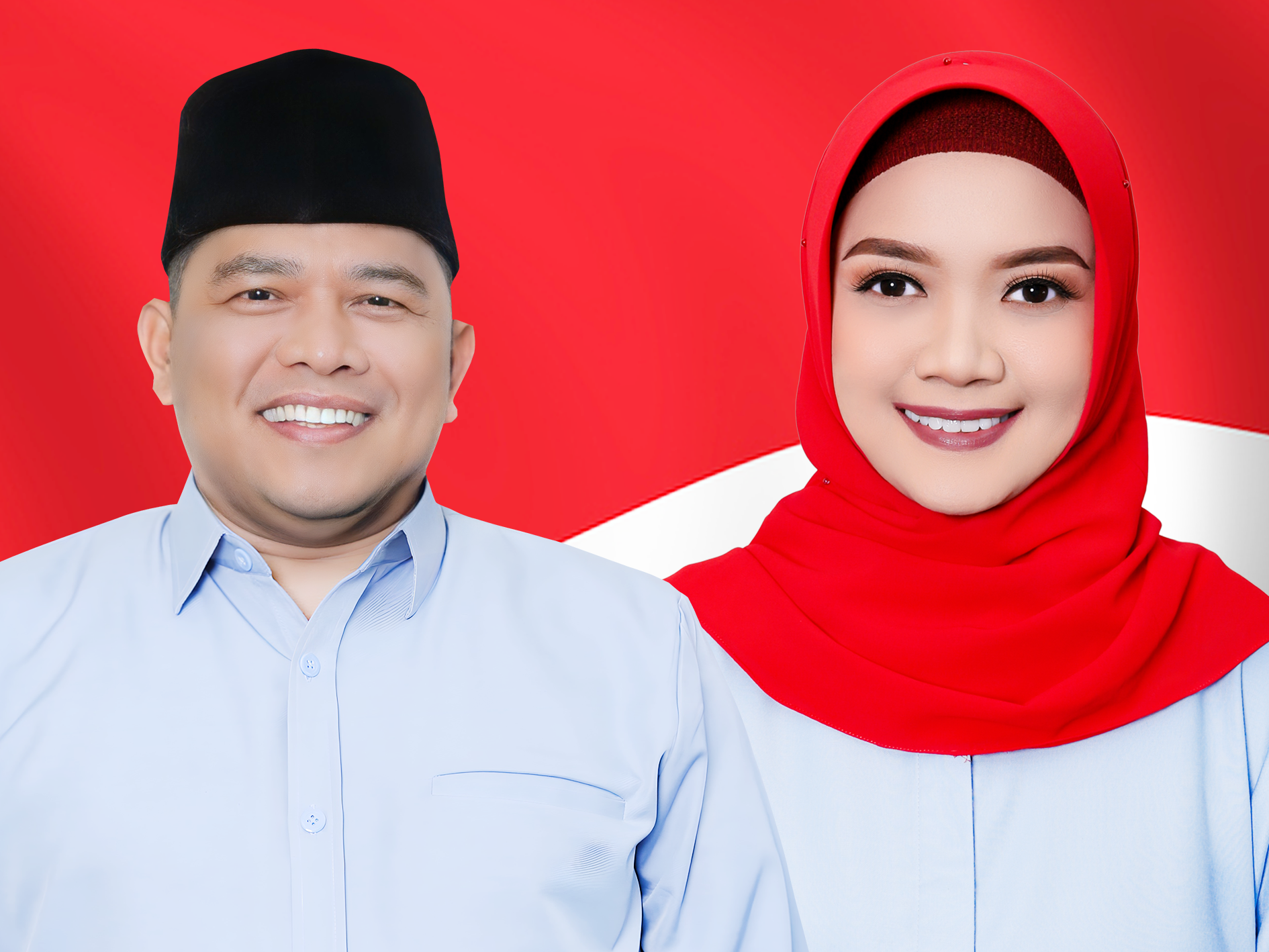
Candidate	Aep Syaepuloh	Acep Jamhuri
Party	PKS	Gerindra
Running mate	Maslani	Gina Fadlia Swara
Popular vote	669,674	541,318
Percentage	55.3%	44.7%
- Election results by district and village
Regent before election
Aep Syaepuloh
PKS
Elected Regent
Aep Syaepuloh
PKS

The 2024 Karawang regency election was held on 27 November 2024 as part of nationwide local elections to elect the regent of Karawang Regency for a five-year term. The previous election was held in 2020. Incumbent regent Aep Syaepuloh secured a second term.

== Electoral system ==
The election, like other local elections in 2024, follow the first-past-the-post system where the candidate with the most votes wins the election, even if they do not win a majority. It is possible for a candidate to run uncontested, in which case the candidate is still required to win a majority of votes "against" an "empty box" option. Should the candidate fail to do so, the election will be repeated on a later date.

== Candidates ==
According to electoral regulations, in order to qualify for the election, candidates are required to secure support from a political party or a coalition of parties controlling 10 seats in the Karawang Regional House of Representatives (DPRD). As no parties won 10 or more seats in the 2024 legislative election, all parties must form coalitions in order to nominate a candidate in the election. Candidates may alternatively demonstrate support in form of photocopies of identity cards, which in Karawang's case corresponds to 115,649 copies. No such candidates registered or expressed interest prior to the deadline set by the General Elections Commission (KPU).

=== Potential ===
The following are individuals who have either been publicly mentioned as a potential candidate by a political party in the DPRD, publicly declared their candidacy with press coverage, or considered as a potential candidate by media outlets:

- Aep Syaepuloh (Nasdem), incumbent regent.
- Rahmat Hidayat Djati (PKB), member of the West Java Regional House of Representatives and chairman of PKB's Karawang branch.

== Political map ==
Following the 2024 Indonesian legislative election, eight political parties are represented in the Karawang DPRD:

Political parties	Seat count
Great Indonesia Movement Party (Gerindra)	8 / 50
Democratic Party (Demokrat)	8 / 50
Prosperous Justice Party (PKS)	7 / 50
NasDem Party	7 / 50
National Awakening Party (PKB)	6 / 50
Indonesian Democratic Party of Struggle (PDI-P)	6 / 50
Party of Functional Groups (Golkar)	6 / 50
National Mandate Party (PAN)	2 / 50
