= Cipada, Cikalongwetan =

Village in West Java, Indonesia

Cipada (Indonesian pronunciation: [t͡ʃiˈpada]) is a village in the Cikalongwetan District, West Bandung Regency, West Java, Indonesia.

== See also ==
Other villages in Cikalongwetan District:

- Cikalong
- Ciptagumati
- Cisomang Barat
- Ganjarsari
- Kanangasari
- Mandalamukti
- Mandalasari
- Mekarjaya
- Puteran
- Rende
- Tenjolaut
- Wangunjaya
