= SMP Negeri 2 Kotabaru =

Junior high school in Karawang Regency, West Java, Indonesia

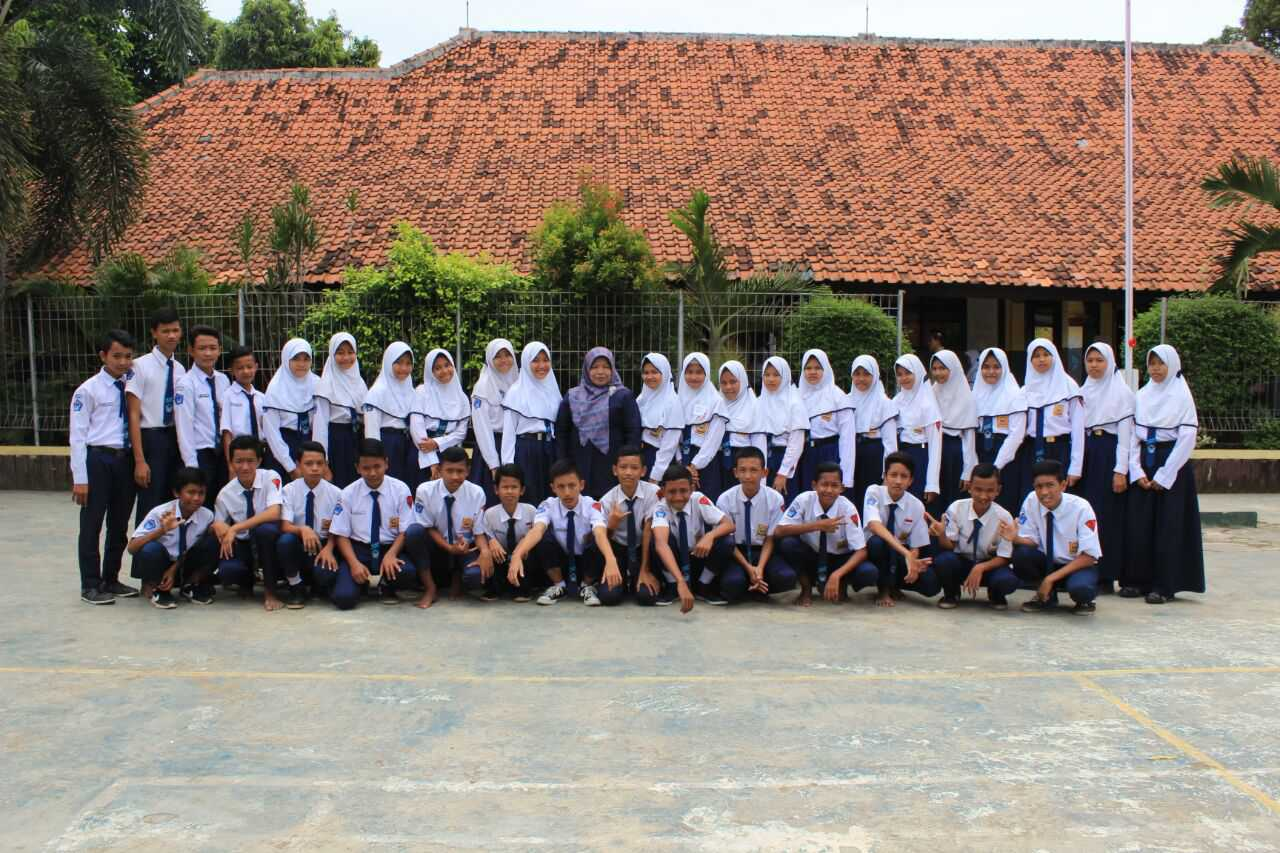
Students at SMP Negeri 2 Kotabaru

Sekolah Menengah Pertama Negeri 2 Kotabaru, or SMP Negeri 2 Kotabaru is a junior highschool in Kotabaru, Karawang, West Java, Indonesia. The first name of this school is SMP Negeri 3 Cikampek, but Cikampek District was divided into three districts.

== Facility ==
The facilities and infrastructure in this school are:

- Laboratory
- Classroom
- Basket field
- Unit Kesehatan Sekolah (school health center)
- Mosque
- Computer Laboratory
- Art room
- Canteen
- Garden
- etc.
