= Buky Wibawa =

Indonesian politician

- ᮘᮥᮊ᮪ᮚ᮪ ᮝᮤᮘᮝ
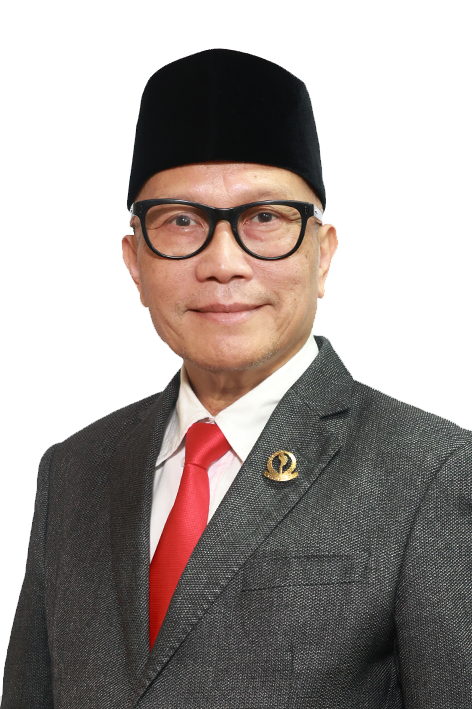
- 2024 portrait

16th Speaker of the West Java Regional House of Representatives
- Incumbent
- Assumed office 9 October 2024
- Governor: Bey Machmudin (acting); Dedi Mulyadi
- Deputy: 2024–2029 period: Iwan Suryawan; M. Q. Iswara; Ono Surono; Acep Jamaludin
- Preceded by: Taufik Hidayat

Member of the West Java Regional House of Representatives
- Incumbent
- Assumed office 2 September 2019
- Constituency: West Java 1
- Majority: 42,073 (2019); 61,455 (2024)

Personal details
- Born: Buky Wibawa Karya Guna; 30 October 1962 (age 62); Bandung, West Java, Indonesia
- Political party: Gerindra

Buky Wibawa Karya Guna (Sundanese: ᮘᮥᮊ᮪ᮚ᮪ ᮝᮤᮘᮝ ᮊᮁᮚ ᮌᮥᮔ; born 30 October 1962), also known as Bucky Wikagoe, is an Indonesian politician of the Gerindra Party, academic, and musician. He has been a member of the West Java Regional House of Representatives (DPRD) since 2019, and its speaker since October 2024.

== Early life ==
Buky Wibawa was born in Bandung, West Java on 30 October 1962. His family lived in Kuala Lumpur, Malaysia for a time during his youth, and he completed elementary school there in 1974. He completed middle school in Bandung, and high school in Jakarta in 1980. Later, he would receive a bachelor's degree from Nusantara Islamic University in 1996, along with master's and a doctorate from Padjadjaran University in 2000 and 2008.

== Career ==
During the 1980s, Buky worked as a singer-songwriter, releasing several albums and writing songs for his younger sister Nicky Astria. In 2001, Buky along with Nicky and his other sibling Dicky Nugraha founded the Bandung School of Music. He would continue to work and lecture at the school, being its head since 2010. He also gave lectures at Padjadjaran, beginning in 2017. Buky is also active in cultural activities, leading the provincial intangible cultural heritage task force. He also worked as an intellectual property consultant.

Buky ran for a seat in the House of Representatives in the 2014 Indonesian legislative election as a Gerindra Party candidate, but was not elected. In the 2019 legislative election, Buky instead ran for a seat at the West Java Regional House of Representatives (DPRD) representing West Java's 1st district (Bandung and Cimahi), securing a seat after winning 42,073 votes. He was reelected in the 2024 election from the same district with 61,455 votes. Buky also joined the campaign team of Dedi Mulyadi as a spokesperson in the 2024 West Java gubernatorial election.

On 9 October 2024, Buky was elected as speaker of the West Java DPRD. As legislature speaker, Buky voiced his support for Dedi Mulyadi's program of military training for delinquent teenagers. He was also elected chairman of the association of provincial legislators in May 2025.

== Personal life ==
He is married to Elin Mulyani, and the couple has two children.
