= Taufik Hidayat (disambiguation) =

Taufik Hidayat (born 1981) is a retired Indonesian badminton player and Democratic Party politician.

Taufik Hidayat may also refer to:

- Taufik Hidayat (Gerindra Party politician), (born 1959)
- Taufik Hidayat (footballer, born 1993)
- Taufik Hidayat (footballer, born 1999)
