= West Java Regional House of Representatives =

Unicameral legislature of the Indonesian province of West Java

West Java Province Regional House of Representatives Dewan Perwakilan Rakyat Daerah Provinsi Jawa Barat ᮓᮦᮝᮔ᮪ ᮕᮀᮝᮊᮤᮜ᮪ ᮛᮠᮚᮒ᮪ ᮓᮆᮛᮂ ᮕᮢᮧᮗᮤᮔ᮪ᮞᮤ ᮏᮝ ᮊᮥᮜᮧᮔ᮪
- 2024–2029 Period

Type
- Type: Unicameral
- Term limits: 5 years

History
- Founded: 1950; 76 years ago
- New session started: 2 September 2024

Leadership
- Speaker: Buky Wibawa, Gerindra since 9 October 2024
- Deputy Speaker: Iwan Suryawan, PKS since 9 October 2024
- Deputy Speaker: M. Q. Iswara, Golkar since 9 October 2024
- Deputy Speaker: Ono Surono, PDI-P since 9 October 2024
- Deputy Speaker: Acep Jamaludin, PKB since 9 October 2024

Structure
- Seats: 120
- Political groups: Government (55): Gerindra (20); Golkar (19); Democratic (8); PAN (7); PSI (1); Supported by (23): PDI-P (17); PPP (6); Opposition (42): PKS (19); PKB (15); NasDem (8)

Elections
- Voting system: Open list proportional representation
- Last election: 14 February 2024
- Next election: 2029

Meeting place
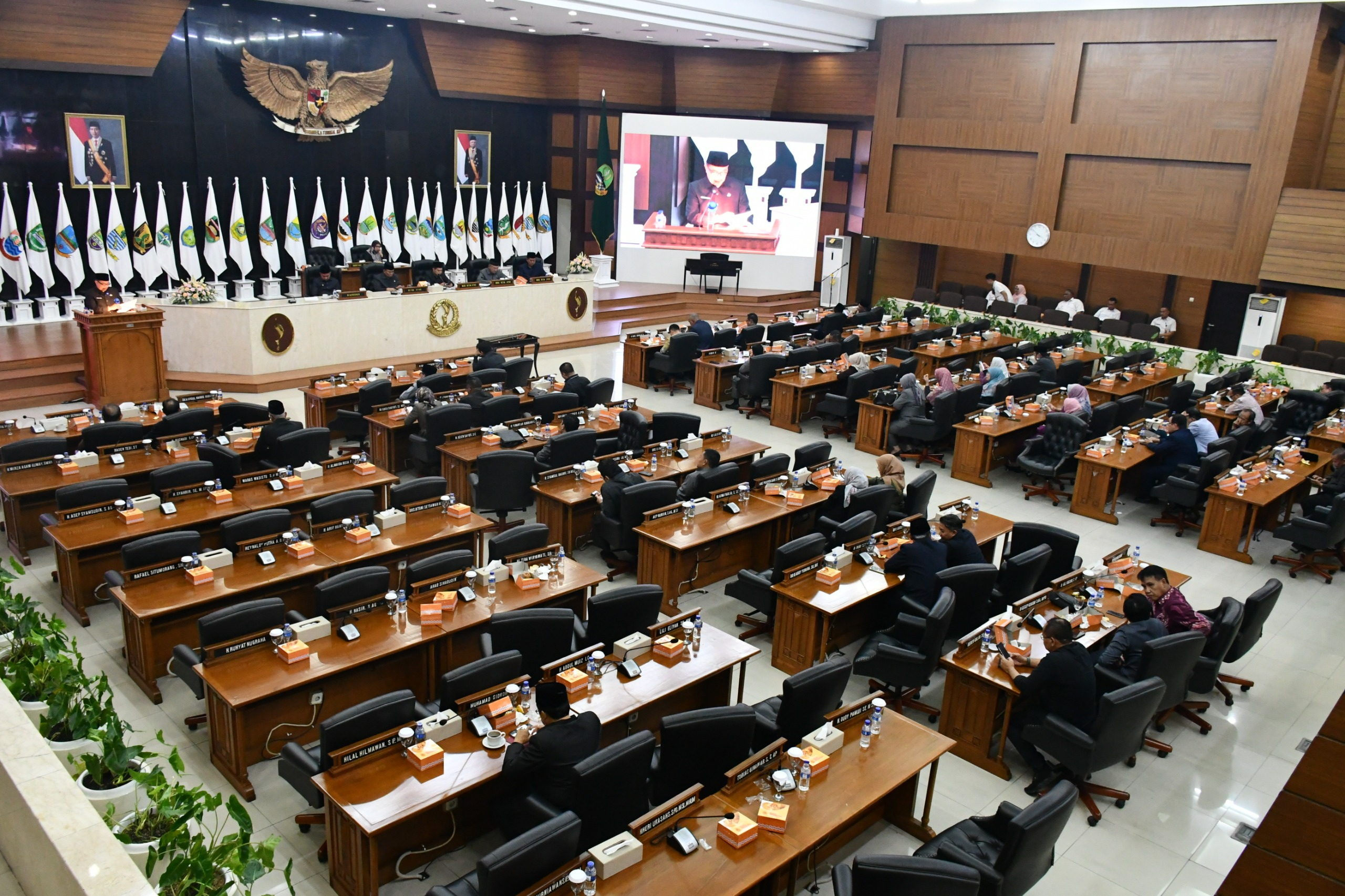
- DPRD Chamber - West Java Provincial DPRD Building, Jalan Diponegoro No. 27, Bandung, West Java, Indonesia

Website
- dprd.jabarprov.go.id

The West Java Regional House of Representatives (Indonesian: Dewan Perwakilan Rakyat Daerah Provinsi Jawa Barat; Sundanese: ᮓᮦᮝᮔ᮪ ᮕᮀᮝᮊᮤᮜ᮪ ᮛᮠᮚᮒ᮪ ᮓᮆᮛᮂ ᮕᮢᮧᮗᮤᮔ᮪ᮞᮤ ᮏᮝ ᮊᮥᮜᮧᮔ᮪, romanized: Déwan Pangwakil Rahayat Daérah Propinsi Jawa Kulon) is the unicameral legislature of the Indonesian province of West Java.

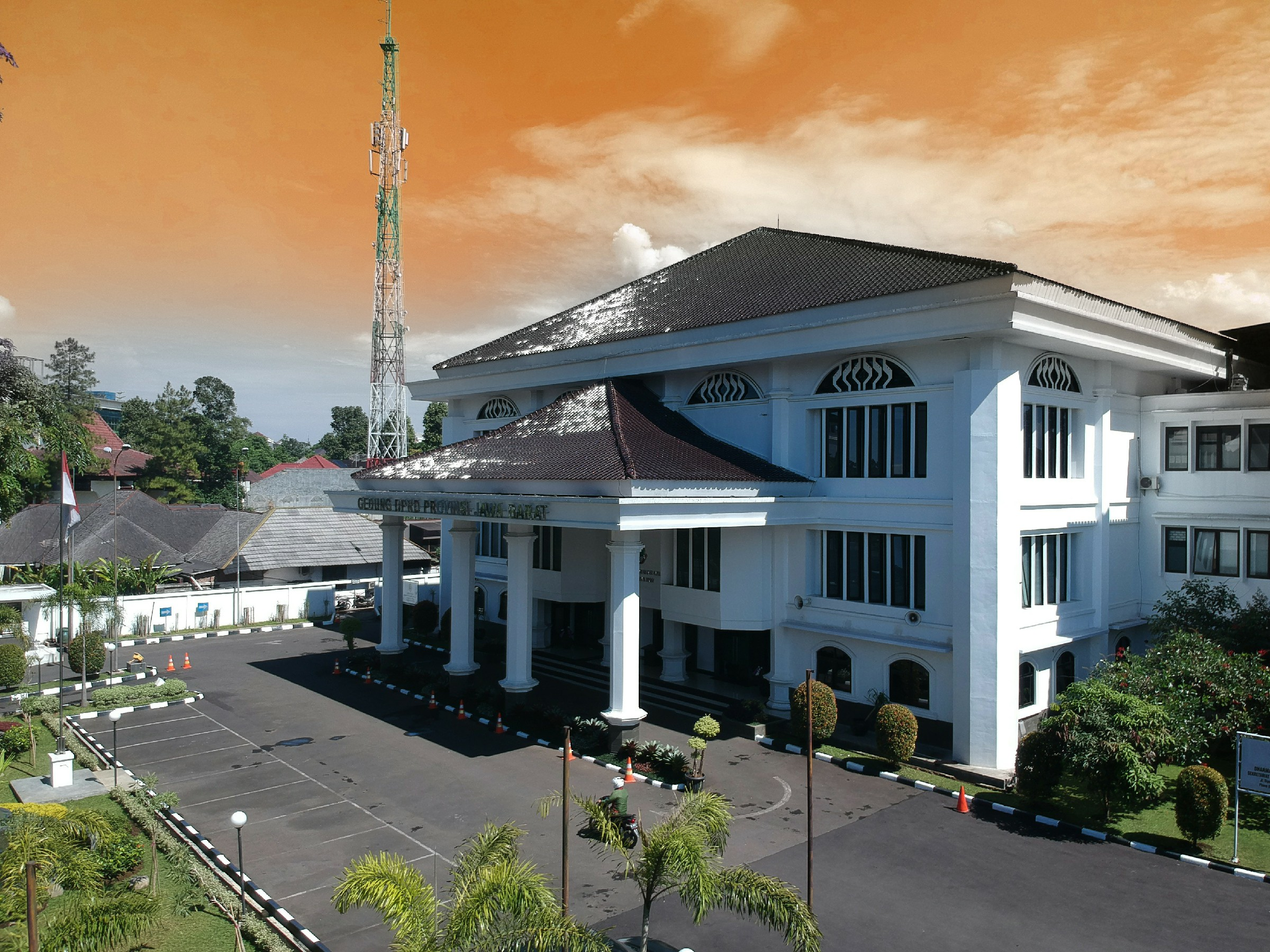
West Java Provincial DPRD Building

== History ==
The council was first founded in 1950, with Djaja Rahmat as its speaker. The council, which was called a "temporary provincial council" (Indonesian: Dewan Perwakilan Rakyat Daerah Sementara) initially had 60 members. Before 1950, a similar body was present which was headed by Oto Iskandar di Nata. After being renamed to its present name in 1955, the number of councillors went up from 60 to 75, down to 74, before becoming the present 100.

On 29 August 2025, the legislature's building was attacked by protesters and damaged, with windows broken and the building's exterior burned by molotov cocktails.

== Composition ==
Legislative Period	# of seats	Golkar seats	PDI-P seats	PPP seats	PAN seats	PKB seats	Demokrat seats	PDS seats	PBB seats	PKPB seats	PKS seats	Hanura seats	Gerindra seats	NasDem seats	Perindo seats	PSI seats
2004–2009	100	28	19	13	8	6	9	1	1	1	14					
2009–2014	100	16	17	8	5	2	28	0	0	0	13	3	8			
2014–2019	100	17	20	9	4	7	12		0		12	3	11	5		
2019–2024	120	16	20	3	7	12	11		0		21	0	25	4	1	
2024–2029	120	19	17	6	7	15	8		0		19	0	20	8	0	1
Total		96	93	39	31	42	68	1	1	1	79	6	64	17	1	1

== Speakers ==
No	Period	Speaker
1	1950–1955	Djaja Rahmat
2	1957–1960	Oja Sumantri
3	1960–1967	LG Mashudi
4	1967–1971	Rahmat Sulaeman
5	1971–1977	Rahmat Sulaeman
6	1977–1982	BG Adjat Sudrajat
7	1982–1987	MG Suratman
8	1987–1992	MG Suratman
9	1992–1997	BG Agus Muhyidin
10	1997–1999	MG Abdul Nurhaman
11	1999–2004	Idin Rafiudin (died in office); Eka Santosa
12	2004–2009	A.M. Ruslan
13	2009–2014	Irfan Suryanagara
14	2014–2019	Ineu Purwadewi Sundari
15	2019–2024	Taufik Hidayat
16	2024–2029	Buky Wibawa

== Electoral districts ==
Electoral districts of the West Java Regional House of Representatives, shaded by number of seats allocated to each electoral district

For the 2019 legislative election, there will be 120 seats for contest from 15 electoral districts:

- West Java 1: Bandung, Cimahi (8 seats)
- West Java 2: Bandung Regency (10 seats)
- West Java 3: West Bandung Regency (4 seats)
- West Java 4: Cianjur Regency (6 seats)
- West Java 5: Sukabumi, Sukabumi Regency (8 seats)
- West Java 6: Bogor Regency (11 seats)
- West Java 7: Bogor (3 seats)
- West Java 8: Bekasi, Depok (11 seats)
- West Java 9: Bekasi Regency (7 seats)
- West Java 10: Karawang Regency, Purwakarta Regency (8 seats)
- West Java 11: Majalengka Regency, Subang Regency, Sumedang Regency (11 seats)
- West Java 12: Cirebon, Cirebon Regency, Indramayu Regency (12 seats)
- West Java 13: Banjar, Ciamis Regency, Kuningan Regency, Pangandaran Regency (8 seats)
- West Java 14: Garut Regency (6 seats)
- West Java 15: Tasikmalaya, Tasikmalaya Regency (7 seats)
