= Ngamprah =

- District

Regional transcription(s)
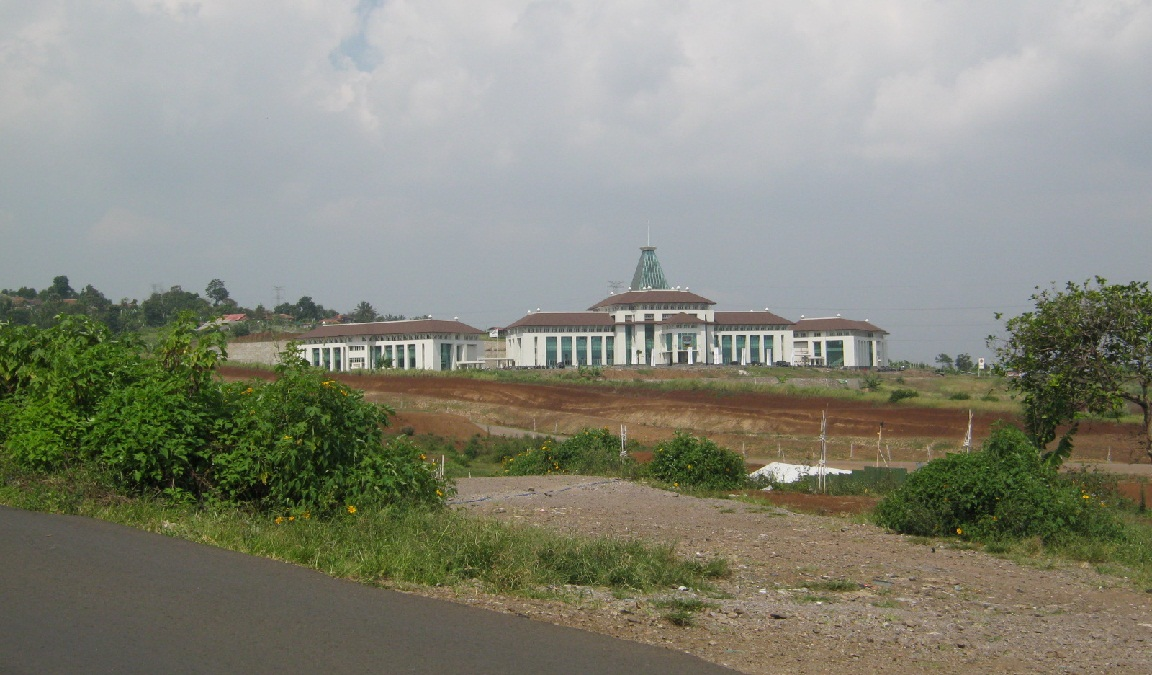
- West Bandung Regency office in Ngamprah

- Location in Java and Indonesia Ngamprah (Indonesia)
- Coordinates: 6°49′45″S 107°29′46″E
- Country: Indonesia
- Province: West Java
- Regency: West Bandung Regency

Government
  - Camat: Drs. Med Ardiwilaga, M.Si

Area
  - Total: 35.55 km^{2} (13.73 sq mi)
- Elevation: 755 m (2,477 ft)

Population (mid 2024 estimate)
  - Total: 180,603
  - Density: 5,080/km^{2} (13,160/sq mi)
- Time zone: UTC+7 (IWST)
- Postal code: 40552
- Area code: (+62) 22
- Villages: 11

Ngamprah (ᮌᮙ᮪ᮕᮢᮂ) is an administrative district (kecamatan) in the central Parahyangan region of Java, Indonesia. It covers a land area of 35.55 km^{2}, and had a population of 154,166 at the 2010 Census and 177,690 at the 2020 Census; the latest official estimate as at mid 2024 was 180,603 (comprising 91,741 males and 88,862 females). The district includes the town (desa) of the same name, which serves as the regency seat of West Bandung Regency in West Java Province of Indonesia.

== Administrative Divisions ==
Ngamprah District is divided into eleven administrative villages (desa), all sharing the post code of 40552. Their areas and the estimated populations as at mid 2024, are set out below:

Kode Wilayah	Name of Desa	Area in km^{2}	Population mid 2024 estimate
32.17.06.2002	Cimareme	2.24	12,249
32.17.06.2009	Gadobangkong	1.63	15,053
32.17.06.2004	Tanimulya	2.30	39,055
32.17.06.2011	Pakuhaji	2.63	10,078
32.17.06.2003	Cilame	6.68	37,339
32.17.06.2007	Margajaya	1.24	16,505
32.17.06.2008	Mekarsari	1.97	13,229
32.17.06.2001	Ngamprah (town)	1.52	7,510
32.17.06.2010	Sukatani	4.63	8,194
32.17.06.2005	Cimanggu	6.12	6,678
32.17.06.2006	Bojongkoneng	4.62	14,713
32.17.06	Totals	35.55	180,603

== Climate ==
Ngamprah has an elevation moderated tropical rainforest climate (Af) with moderate rainfall from June to September and heavy rainfall from October to May.

Climate data for Ngamprah
Month	Jan	Feb	Mar	Apr	May	Jun	Jul	Aug	Sep	Oct	Nov	Dec	Year
Mean daily maximum °C (°F)	26.4 (79.5)	26.6 (79.9)	27.1 (80.8)	27.5 (81.5)	27.5 (81.5)	27.2 (81.0)	27.2 (81.0)	27.9 (82.2)	28.6 (83.5)	28.5 (83.3)	27.6 (81.7)	27.1 (80.8)	27.4 (81.4)
Daily mean °C (°F)	22.3 (72.1)	22.4 (72.3)	22.6 (72.7)	22.8 (73.0)	22.6 (72.7)	21.8 (71.2)	21.5 (70.7)	21.9 (71.4)	22.5 (72.5)	22.8 (73.0)	22.6 (72.7)	22.6 (72.7)	22.4 (72.3)
Mean daily minimum °C (°F)	18.3 (64.9)	18.2 (64.8)	18.1 (64.6)	18.2 (64.8)	17.8 (64.0)	16.5 (61.7)	15.8 (60.4)	15.9 (60.6)	16.4 (61.5)	17.2 (63.0)	17.7 (63.9)	18.1 (64.6)	17.3 (63.2)
Average rainfall mm (inches)	294 (11.6)	270 (10.6)	302 (11.9)	302 (11.9)	213 (8.4)	101 (4.0)	88 (3.5)	99 (3.9)	107 (4.2)	206 (8.1)	314 (12.4)	331 (13.0)	2,627 (103.5)
Source: Climate-Data.org
