= Cikalongwetan =

District in West Bandung Regency, West Java

Cikalongwetan (usually written as "Cikalong Wetan") is an administrative district (kecamatan) of West Bandung Regency, in West Java Province of Indonesia. It covers a land area of 110.94 square kilometres (42.83 sq mi), and had a population of 108,480 at the 2010 Census and 128,106 at the 2020 Census; the official estimate as at mid 2024 was 135,944. It is subdivided into thirteen villages (desa), all sharing the post code of 40556.

== Villages (desa) ==
1. Cikalong
2. Cipada
3. Ciptagumati
4. Cisomang Barat
5. Ganjarsari
6. Kanangasari
7. Mandalamukti
8. Mandalasari
9. Mekarjaya
10. Puteran
11. Rende
12. Tenjolaut
13. Wangunjaya
