= Aep Syaepuloh =

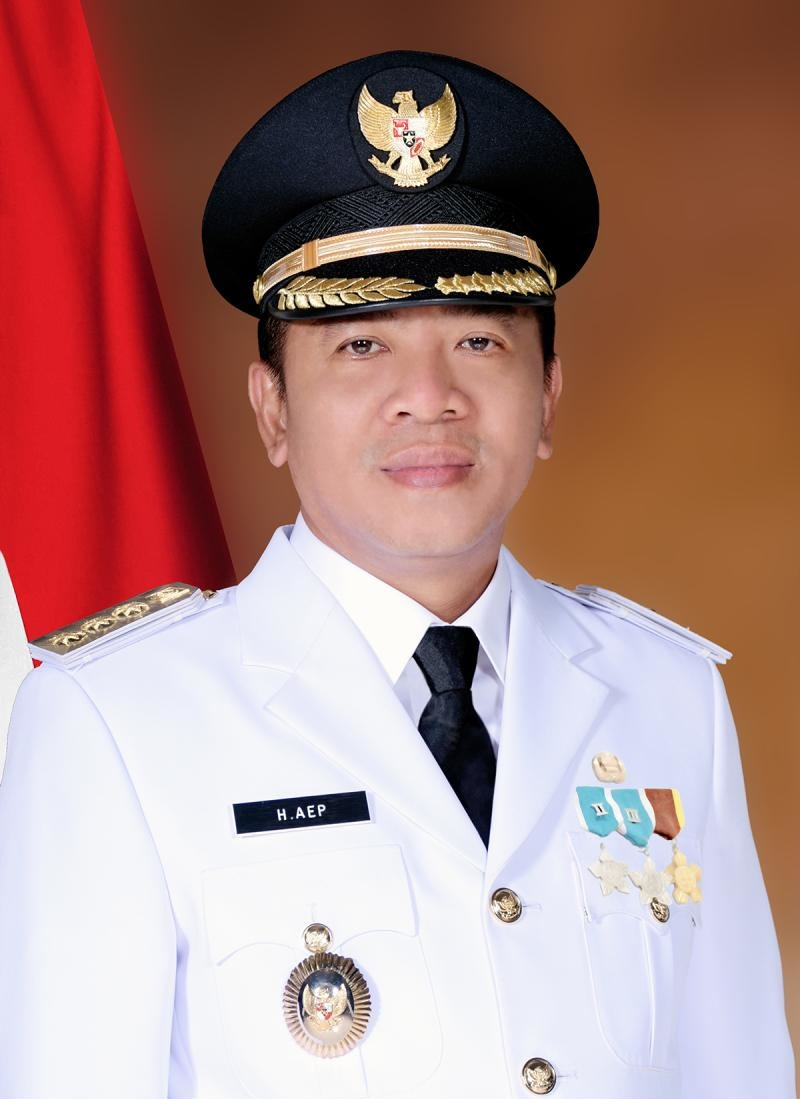

Regent of Karawang
- Incumbent
- Assumed office 4 December 2023; Acting since 25 September 2023
- Governor: Bey Machmudin (acting); Dedi Mulyadi
- Preceded by: Cellica Nurrachadiana

Deputy Regent of Karawang
- In office 26 February 2021 – 25 September 2023
- Regent: Cellica Nurrachadiana
- Preceded by: Ahmad Zamakhsyari
- Succeeded by: Maslani

Personal details
- Born: 7 October 1978 (age 47) Karawang, West Java, Indonesia
- Party: Gerindra
- Other political affiliations: Prosperous Justice Party (until 2025)

Aep Syaepuloh (born 7 October 1978) is an Indonesian politician and businessman who is the regent of Karawang Regency, West Java, having served from December 2023. He was previously vice regent since 2021 under Cellica Nurrachadiana until the latter's resignation.

== Early life ==
Aep Syaepuloh was born in Karawang Regency on 7 October 1978. After completing elementary school there, he moved to Bandar Lampung for some time and completed middle school there before returning to Karawang where he graduated from high school. He studied economics at university, and has a bachelor's degree.

== Career ==
In 2007, Syaepuloh founded PT Bintang Jaya Pratama, a construction company which worked as a subcontractor for toll roads and industrial parks. As a requirement to run for office, he reported his wealth at Rp 391 billion (US$25 million) in 2020.

Syaepuloh ran as the running mate of incumbent Karawang regent Cellica Nurrachadiana in the 2020 Karawang regency election, and the pair was elected with 678,817 votes (60%). They were sworn in on 26 February 2021. Cellica resigned from her post on 3 November 2023, and Syaepuloh became acting regent for a month until he was made full regent on 4 December 2023. He won his first full term in the 2024 regency election.
