= Maos =

District of Central Java, Indonesia

- District
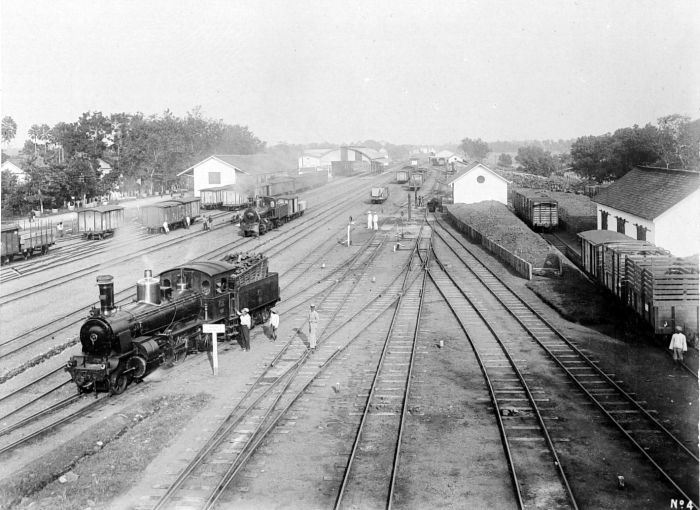
- Rail yard at Maos station, c. 1910
- Interactive map of Maos
- Coordinates: 7°35′41.5284″S 109°8′47.274″E
- Country: Indonesia
- Province: Central Java
- Regency: Cilacap Regency
- District seat: Klapagada

Area
  - Total: 34.30 km^{2} (13.24 sq mi)

Population (2023)
  - Total: 48,192
  - Density: 1,405/km^{2} (3,639/sq mi)
- Time zone: UTC+7 (IWT)
- Regional code: 33.01.07
- Villages: 10

Maos is a district in Cilacap Regency, Central Java, Indonesia. As of mid 2023, it was inhabited by 48,192 people, and has the total area of 34.30 km^{2}.

== Geography ==
Maos district is divided into 10 villages (desa), namely:

- Karangkemiri
- Karangrena
- Maos Kidul
- Maos Lor
- Kalijaran
- Mernek
- Panisihan
- Glempang
- Karangreja
- Klapagada
