= West Karawang =

West Karawang Karawang Barat Karawang Kulon
- District

Regional transcription(s)
  - Sundanese: ᮊᮛᮝᮀ ᮊᮥᮜᮧᮔ᮪
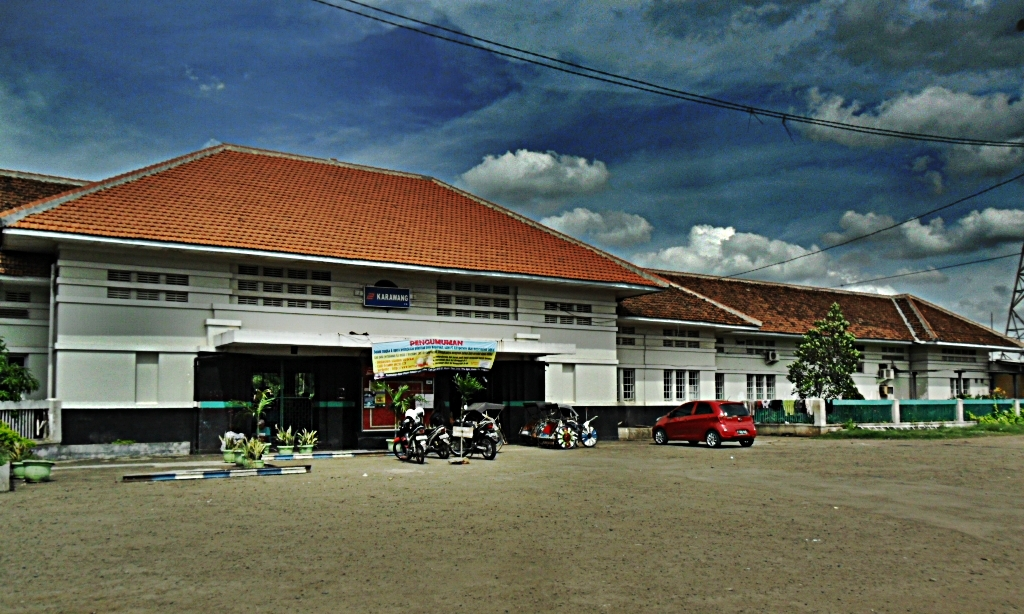
- Karawang Station

- Location in Java and Indonesia West Karawang (Indonesia)
- Coordinates: 6°17′53″S 107°17′56″E
- Country: Indonesia
- Province: West Java
- Regency: Karawang Regency

Government
  - Camat: Lasmi Ningrum
  - Secretary: Khaerul Bahri

Area
  - Total: 39.51 km^{2} (15.25 sq mi)
- Elevation: 22 m (72 ft)

Population (mid 2024 estimate)
  - Total: 174,719
  - Density: 4,422/km^{2} (11,450/sq mi)
- Time zone: UTC+7 (IWT)
- Postal code: 4131x
- Area code: (+62) 264
- Villages: 8
- Website: Official website

West Karawang (Indonesian: Karawang Barat, Sundanese: ᮊᮛᮝᮀ ᮊᮥᮜᮧᮔ᮪; Karawang Kulon) is an administrative district (kecamatan) of Karawang Regency which serves as the regency's administrative centre. It covers a land area of 39.51 km^{2}, and had a population of 155,471 at the 2010 Census and 161,554 at the 2020 Census; the official estimate as at mid 2024 was 174,719 (comprising 88,013 males and 86,706 females).

The district was established in 2003 as a result of Karawang Regency's new regulation regarding its administrative divisions. The district centre is at the town of Tanjungmekar, and the district is sub-divided into eight urban communities (kelurahan), listed below with their areas and populations as at mid 2024, together with their postcodes.

| Kode Wilayah | Name of kelurahan or desa | Area in km^{2} | Population mid 2024 estimate | Post code |
|---|---|---|---|---|
| 32.15.01.1003 | Adiarsa Barat (West Adiarsa) | 2.05 | 20,026 | 41311 |
| 32.15.01.1011 | Nagasari | 4.70 | 25,254 | 41311 |
| 32.15.01.1001 | Karawang Kulon (West Karawang) | 2.56 | 23,000 | 41311 |
| 32.15.01.1005 | Tanjungpura | 4.82 | 22,850 | 41316 |
| 32.15.01.1006 | Tankungmekar | 3.73 | 17,619 | 41311 |
| 32.15.01.1010 | Karangpawitan | 7.28 | 30,114 | 41315 |
| 32.15.01.1012 | Mekarjati | 7.61 | 15,487 | 41312 |
| 32.15.01.1007 | Tunggakjati | 6.76 | 20,369 | 41311 |
| 32.15.01 | Totals | 39.51 | 174,719 | |

== Education ==
Karawang Barat District in 2023 has 50 elementary schools, 20 junior high schools, 10 senior high schools and 18 vocational high schools.

== Health ==
Karawang Barat District in 2023 has 3 hospitals, 30 polyclinics, 5 public health centres and 35 pharmacies.

== Climate ==
Karawang has a tropical monsoon climate (Am) with moderate to little rainfall from May to October and heavy rainfall from November to April.

Climate data for Karawang
| Month | Jan | Feb | Mar | Apr | May | Jun | Jul | Aug | Sep | Oct | Nov | Dec | Year |
|---|---|---|---|---|---|---|---|---|---|---|---|---|---|
| Mean daily maximum °C (°F) | 30.1 (86.2) | 30.2 (86.4) | 30.9 (87.6) | 31.7 (89.1) | 32.0 (89.6) | 32.1 (89.8) | 32.1 (89.8) | 32.7 (90.9) | 33.2 (91.8) | 33.2 (91.8) | 32.2 (90.0) | 31.2 (88.2) | 31.8 (89.3) |
| Daily mean °C (°F) | 26.4 (79.5) | 26.4 (79.5) | 26.8 (80.2) | 27.2 (81.0) | 27.3 (81.1) | 27.1 (80.8) | 26.8 (80.2) | 27.2 (81.0) | 27.6 (81.7) | 27.8 (82.0) | 27.4 (81.3) | 27.0 (80.6) | 27.1 (80.7) |
| Mean daily minimum °C (°F) | 22.7 (72.9) | 22.7 (72.9) | 22.7 (72.9) | 22.8 (73.0) | 22.7 (72.9) | 22.1 (71.8) | 21.6 (70.9) | 21.7 (71.1) | 22.0 (71.6) | 22.4 (72.3) | 22.7 (72.9) | 22.8 (73.0) | 22.4 (72.4) |
| Average rainfall mm (inches) | 279 (11.0) | 260 (10.2) | 214 (8.4) | 149 (5.9) | 124 (4.9) | 99 (3.9) | 65 (2.6) | 38 (1.5) | 59 (2.3) | 122 (4.8) | 203 (8.0) | 211 (8.3) | 1,823 (71.8) |
Source: Climate-Data.org

== See also ==
- San Diego Hills, a cemetery in West Karawang
