= East Karawang =

East Karawang Karawang Timur Karawang Wétan
- District

Regional transcription(s)
  - Sundanese: ᮊᮛᮝᮀ ᮝᮦᮒᮔ᮪
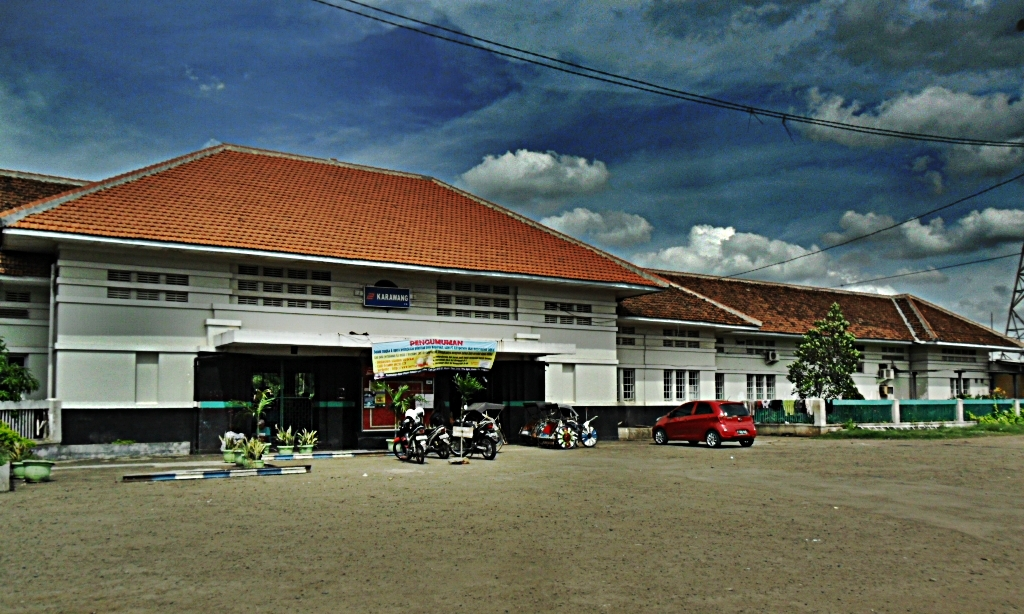
- Karawang Station

- Location in Java and Indonesia East Karawang (Indonesia)
- Coordinates: 6°17′53″S 107°17′56″E
- Country: Indonesia
- Province: West Java
- Regency: Karawang Regency

Area
  - Total: 29.77 km^{2} (11.49 sq mi)
- Elevation: 22 m (72 ft)

Population (mid 2024 estimate)
  - Total: 149,866
  - Density: 5,034/km^{2} (13,040/sq mi)
- Time zone: UTC+7 (IWT)
- Postal code: 4131x
- Area code: (+62) 264
- Villages: 8
- Website: Official website

East Karawang (Indonesian: Karawang Timur, Sundanese: ᮊᮛᮝᮀ ᮊᮥᮜᮧᮔ᮪; Karawang Wétan) is an administrative district (kecamatan) of Karawang Regency. It covers a land area of 29.77 km^{2}, and had a population of 118,001 at the 2010 Census and 146,326 at the 2020 Census; the official estimate as at mid 2024 was 149,866 (comprising 75,236 males and 74,630 females).

The district centre is at the town of East Adiarsa, and the district is sub-divided into four urban communities (kelurahan) and four nominally rural villages (desa), all listed below with their areas and populations as at mid 2024, together with their postcodes. The first four communities listed in the table are the desa, while the last four are kelurahan.

Kode Wilayah	Name of kelurahan or desa	Area in km^{2}	Population mid 2024 estimate	Post code
32.15.26.2006	Warungbambu	1.65	11,192	41313
32.15.26.2007	Kondangjaya	2.44	24,498	41313
32.15.26.2005	Margasari	2.76	13,022	41313
32.15.26.2008	Tegalsawah	4.38	9,101	41314
32.15.26.1002	Adiarsa Timur (East Adiarsa)	4.32	12,037	41314
32.15.26.1001	Karawang Wétan (East Karawang)	3.20	35,359	41314
32.15.26.1003	Palumbonsari	4.02	33,465	41314
32.15.26.1004	Plawad	7.00	11,192	41314
32.15.26	Totals	29.77	149,866	

== Climate ==
Karawang has a tropical monsoon climate (Am) with moderate to little rainfall from May to October and heavy rainfall from November to April.

Climate data for Karawang
Month	Jan	Feb	Mar	Apr	May	Jun	Jul	Aug	Sep	Oct	Nov	Dec	Year
Mean daily maximum °C (°F)	30.1 (86.2)	30.2 (86.4)	30.9 (87.6)	31.7 (89.1)	32.0 (89.6)	32.1 (89.8)	32.1 (89.8)	32.7 (90.9)	33.2 (91.8)	33.2 (91.8)	32.2 (90.0)	31.2 (88.2)	31.8 (89.3)
Daily mean °C (°F)	26.4 (79.5)	26.4 (79.5)	26.8 (80.2)	27.2 (81.0)	27.3 (81.1)	27.1 (80.8)	26.8 (80.2)	27.2 (81.0)	27.6 (81.7)	27.8 (82.0)	27.4 (81.3)	27.0 (80.6)	27.1 (80.7)
Mean daily minimum °C (°F)	22.7 (72.9)	22.7 (72.9)	22.7 (72.9)	22.8 (73.0)	22.7 (72.9)	22.1 (71.8)	21.6 (70.9)	21.7 (71.1)	22.0 (71.6)	22.4 (72.3)	22.7 (72.9)	22.8 (73.0)	22.4 (72.4)
Average rainfall mm (inches)	279 (11.0)	260 (10.2)	214 (8.4)	149 (5.9)	124 (4.9)	99 (3.9)	65 (2.6)	38 (1.5)	59 (2.3)	122 (4.8)	203 (8.0)	211 (8.3)	1,823 (71.8)
Source: Climate-Data.org
