= Ciremai (train) =

Passenger train service between Bandung and Semarang via Cirebon, Indonesia

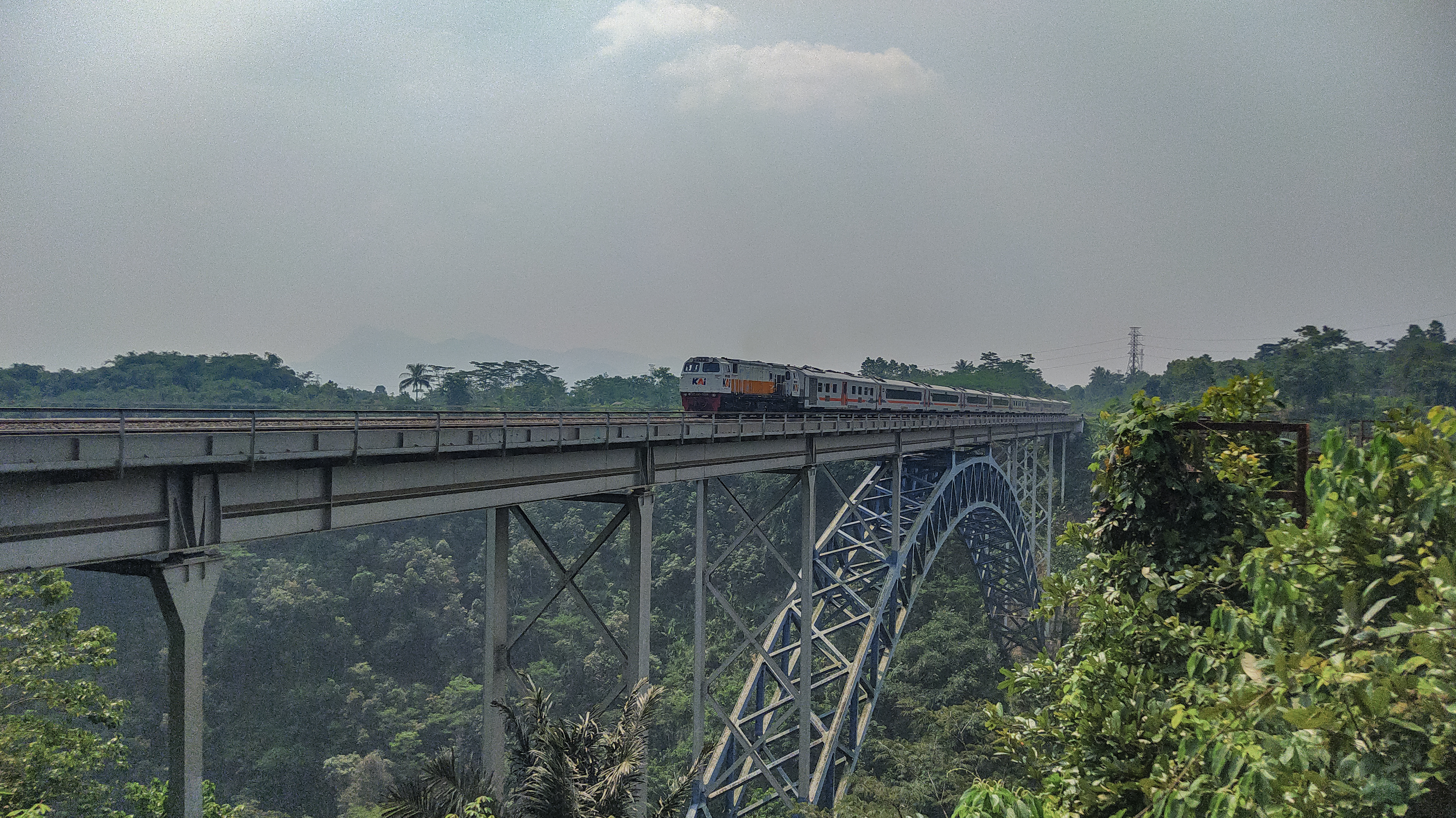
- Ciremai train passing the Cisomang railway bridge, 2024

Overview
- Service type: Inter-city rail
- Status: Operational
- First service: 28 September 2013
- Current operator: Kereta Api Indonesia

Route
- Termini: Bandung; Semarang Tawang Bank Jateng
- Distance travelled: 451 km (280 mil)
- Average journey time: 7 hours 11 minutes
- Service frequency: 2x Daily each way
- Train number: 171-174

On-board services
- Classes: executive & economy
- Seating arrangements: 50 seats arranged 2-2 (executive class); 80 seats arranged 2-2 (economy class)
- Catering facilities: On-board cafe and trolley service

Technical
- Rolling stock: CC206
- Track gauge: 1067 mm
- Operating speed: 70–120 kilometres per hour (43–75 mph)
Route map

Ciremai is an Indonesian passenger train with executive and economy classes, operated by Kereta Api Indonesia, connecting between Bandung and Semarang Tawang Bank Jateng via Cirebon and Tegal railway line. It has two trips each way daily, of 451 km (280 mil) in 7 hours 11 minutes.

== Etymology ==
The word of "Ciremai" is taken from the highest active volcano in West Java which borders Kuningan Regency and Majalengka, is Mount Ciremai, where Cirebon Station is located, which is one of the stopping stations for this train.

== History ==
On 3 March 2009, there was a plan to operate a train connecting Bandung and Cirebon that had been prepared under the name "Papandayan" (Currently the Papandayan train operates on the Gambir–Garut round trip route). The existence of opposition from other transportation modes on the same route and the Department of Transportation (Dishub) resulted in the train being canceled.

On 28 September 2013, The train with a previously planned route finally operates to serve a single trip between Bandung and Cirebon under the name "Ciremai Ekspres". Initially, the Ciremai train service was owned by Cirebon Operational Area III with executive and economy classes (split AC).

On 11 August 2014, The Ciremai economy class train service was removed and replaced by business class and the number of trips was increased so that it served four trips, two of which were additional trains that had executive and business class services until the service was removed starting 16 January 2015.

On 3 October 2016, the Ciremai Ekspres (Ciremai Express) extended to Semarang due to the large number of passengers wanting to travel from Bandung towards Semarang. In addition, the Ciremai train experienced an operational transfer from Cirebon Operational Area III to Semarang Operational Area IV, along with its trains which were previously managed by the Cirebon Station Train Depot being transferred to the Semarang Poncol (SMC) Train Depot.

The Ciremai train consists of four executive cars, four economy cars, one dining car, and one power car.

== List of stations ==
On 1 April 2014, the Ciremai train for the final destination Bandung also serves a stop at Haurgeulis.

- Bandung (Start/End)
- Cimahi
- Padalarang (Integrated with Jakarta–Bandung Whoosh high-speed railway)
- Purwakarta
- Cikampek (for car curtains of locomotive to Bandung or Cirebon)
- Haurgeulis
- Jatibarang
- Cirebon
- Brebes
- Tegal
- Pemalang
- Pekalongan
- Weleri
- Semarang Poncol
- Semarang Tawang (Start/End)

== See also ==
- Harina
- Lodaya
- Argo Wilis
- Turangga
- Malabar
