= Taufik Hidayat (Gerindra Party politician) =

Indonesian general and politician

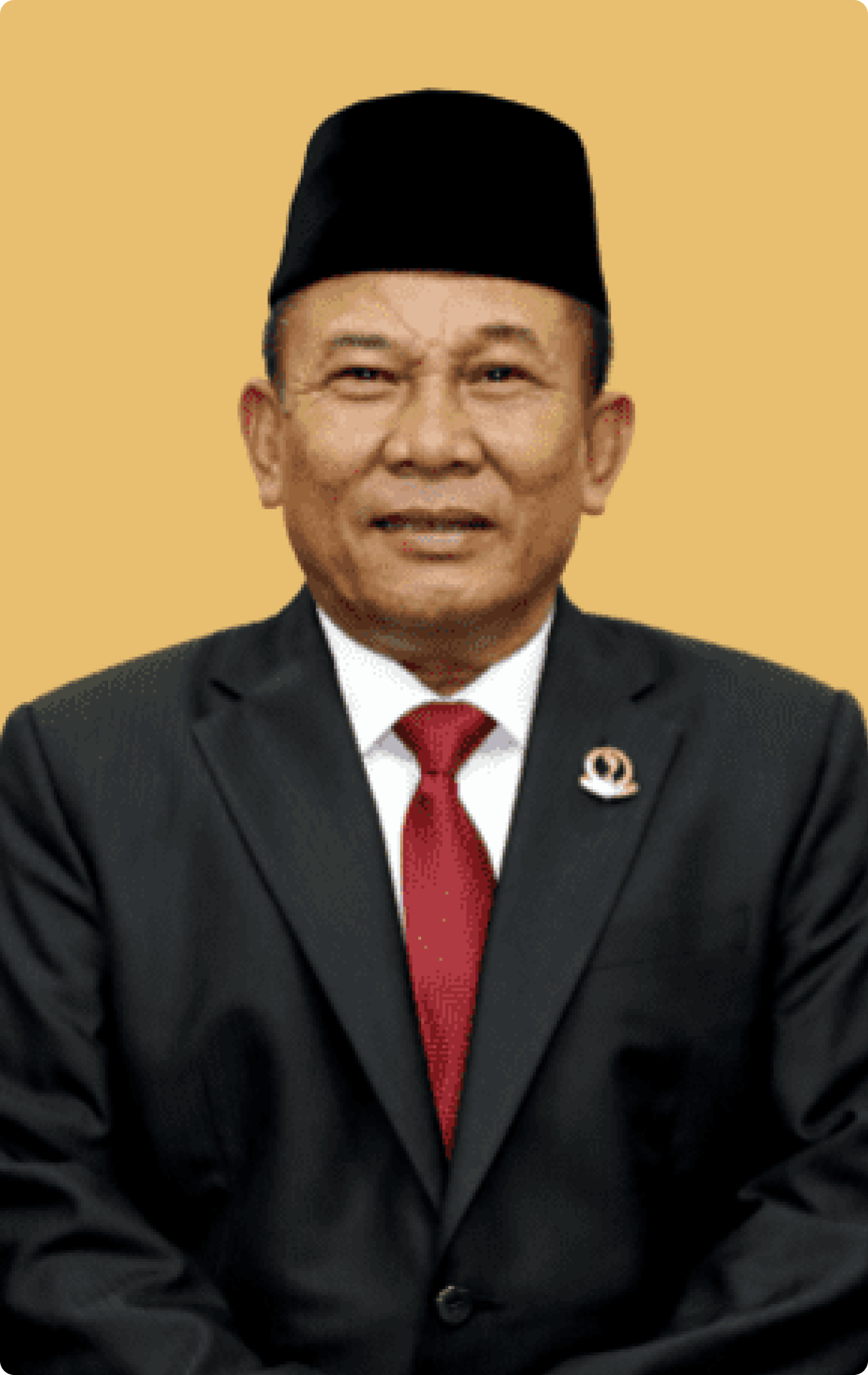
Taufik as member

Taufik Hidayat, S.H., M.H. (born July 22, 1959) is a retired brigadier general of the TNI-AD. Currently, he serves as the 16th Speaker of the West Java Regional House of Representatives (DPRD) from the Gerindra Party for the 2019-2024 period.

Born in Cirebon, he graduated from the Indonesian Military Academy in 1983. During his time in active service, he commanded Korem 143/Halu Oleo, the territorial unit of the Indonesian Army in Southeast Sulawesi, and later was head of the State Intelligence Agency in the province.
