= Harina (train) =

Passenger train service between Bandung and Surabaya via Semarang, Indonesia

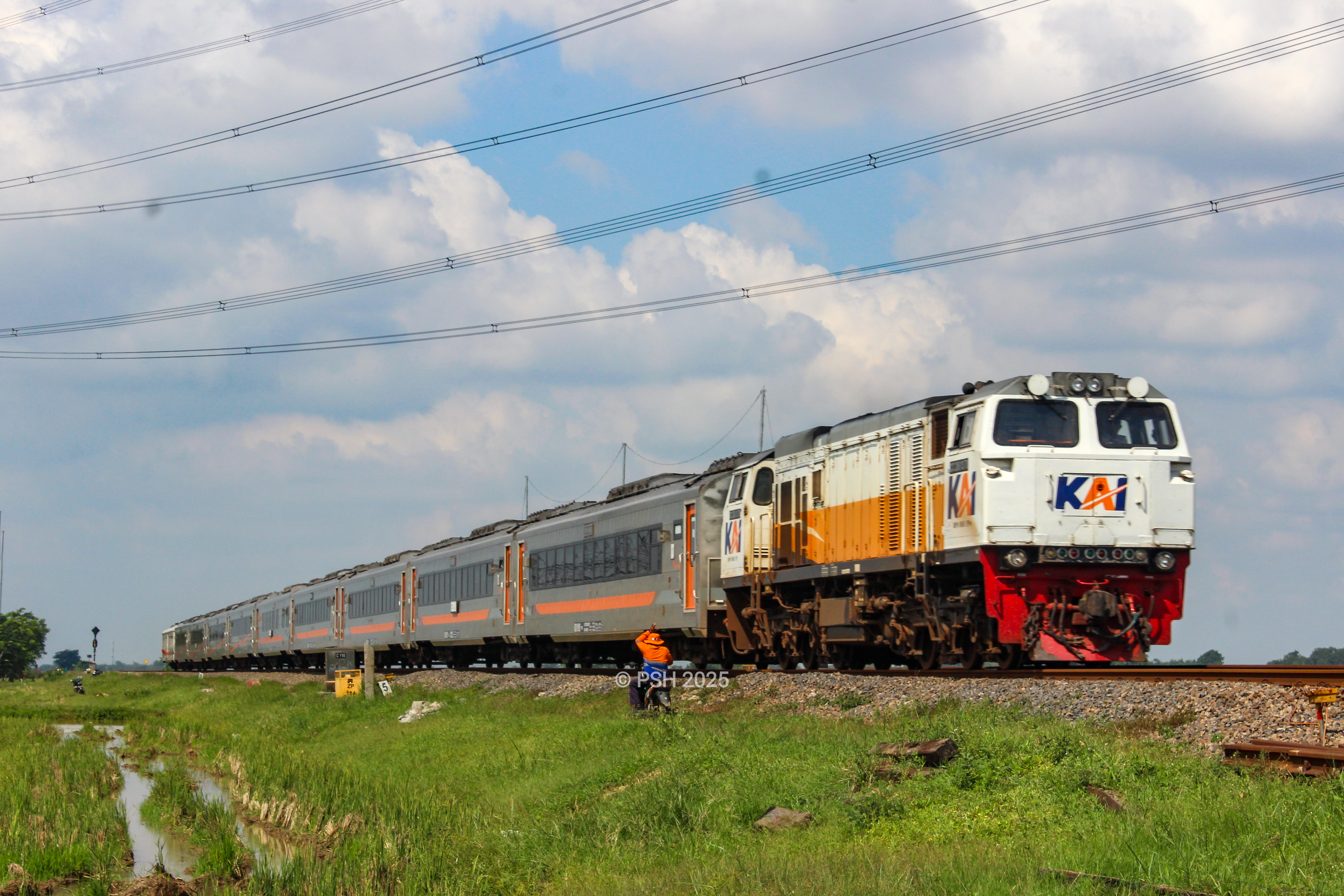
- 99 Harina train prepare passing Tanjungrasa station, May 2025

Overview
- Service type: Inter-city rail
- Status: Operational
- Locale: Operational Area II Bandung
- Predecessor: Mahesa train (1998 - 2000)
- First service: 20 May 2003
- Current operator: Kereta Api Indonesia

Route
- Termini: Bandung; Surabaya Pasar Turi
- Distance travelled: 731 km (454 miles)
- Average journey time: 10 hours 36 minutes
- Service frequency: 4x daily each way
- Train number: 95-102

On-board services
- Classes: premium economy & executive
- Seating arrangements: 50 seats arranged 2-2 (executive class); 80 seats arranged 2-2 (premium economy class)
- Catering facilities: On-board cafe and trolley service
- Observation facilities: The duplex panoramic glass, with blinds, heat insulating laminated layer

Technical
- Rolling stock: CC206
- Track gauge: 1.067 mm
- Operating speed: 60–120 km/h (37 - 75 mph)
Route map

Harina is an mixed passenger train with 2 classes is executive and premium economy class passenger train service that operated by PT Kereta Api Indonesia with the Bandung–Surabaya Pasarturi via the northern Java route (via Cikampek–Semarang Tawang). This train is inter-city rail. The Train travel offer 4x travel around 731 km (454 miles) in 10 hours 36 minutes.

Harina train begin operated by KAI on 20 May 2003 which origin from Blackbuck as the female Indian antelope.

== Etymology ==
Name of the Harina is derived from the Sanskrit word hāriṇa (Devanagari script: हारिण), meaning "female Indian antelope".

The Harina train also assists the Ciremai on the Bandung–Semarang Tawang route, as it runs along the northern Java line, connecting Bandung with Surabaya via Semarang.

== Operating ==
The Harina train first operated on 20 May 2003, as the successor to the Mahesa train on the Bandung–Semarang Tawang route via Southern Java route.

However, the operation of the Mahesa train was stopped because the distance was too long; in this case, the train traveled a route that seemed to be a long detour and the response from passengers was not very encouraging. In addition, this train once had a travel frequency of 2 round trips (morning and evening) before the operation of the Harina morning schedule train was stopped on 1 November 2011 because it did not meet the minimum occupancy level.

Initially, it served the Semarang–Bandung route. After PT KAI rearranged the travel chart, this train route will be extended to Surabaya Pasar Turi. On 1 March 2013, the Rajawali train was removed, while this train's route was extended to Surabaya Pasar Turi, while this train's operations have been transferred from Operation Area IV Semarang to Operation Area II Bandung and the Harina and Rajawali train sets used were also transferred to Bandung (BD).

On 1 August 2018, the Harina train start operate with Stainless Steel car from PT INKA with premium economy & executive class service.

On 24 January 2024, There was a change in the operating pattern of the Harina train because this train series was exchanged with the Malabar with morning departures from Bandung to Malang.

Finally, on 1 February 2025, following the enactment of new train travel chart 2025, Harina train return to morning schedule after almost 14 years of being ceased from operation, and is exchanging trains with the Mutiara Selatan (in English is South Pearl train) which operates on the Bandung–Surabaya Gubeng.

Although the train set has changed location, the Harina morning train schedule is still managed by Bandung Operations Area II. However, it uses a set that isn't located at the main depot in Bandung Operations Area II.

== List of the Station ==
On 1 February 2025, following the enactment of new train travel chart 2025, the Harina train (morning service) returned by Kereta Api Indonesia after nearly 14 years ago ceased for the morning service, but afternoon service still operated by KAI.

- Bandung (Start/End)
- Cimahi
- Padalarang (Integrated with Jakarta–Bandung Whoosh high-speed railway)
- Purwakarta
- Cikampek (for car curtains of locomotive to Bandung or Cirebon)
- Cirebon
- Tegal
- Pekalongan
- Semarang Tawang
- Ngrombo
- Cepu
- Bojonegoro
- Babat
- Lamongan
- Surabaya Pasarturi (Start/End)

== Accidents and incidents ==
- Early on 21 October 2010, the Harina train struck landslide debris and derailed in Jatiluhur, Purwakarta. There were no fatalities, but rail services were disrupted.
- On 1 September 2011, the Harina train collided with an angkot (minibus) in Cibogohilir, Plered, Purwakarta, killing one person.
- On 4 March 2013, the Harina train collided with a motorcycle carrying three people at a level crossing in Pohwates, Kepohbaru, Bojonegoro. All three were killed.
- On 6 April 2014, the Harina train collided with a car at a level crossing in Prayungan, Bojonegoro, killing two of its passengers. The car was one of three returning from a wedding in Jatigede.
- On 11 April 2015, the Harina train collision with the truck loaded with wood broke down at a crossing. There were no fatalities, but the truck was thrown 100 meters.
- On 8 May 2025 at 04.43 local time, the Harina train crash with the soya bean truck on the level crossing in Kaligawe, Semarang, Central Java causing 1 person killed at incident.
- On 21 October 2025 (5 months later) at 16:37, the Harina train (100) heading to Surabaya Pasar Turi collision with the Container Cargo truck in Kaligawe, Gayamsari, Semarang between Semarang Tawang and Alastua causing some train were delayed. Beside that, the Harina 100 train must the train is rolling backwards for evacuating truck, also the CC206 and the generator train were damage as a incident.

== See also ==
- Lodaya
- Malabar
- Turangga
- Argo Wilis
