= Karawang Regency =

Regency in West Java, Indonesia

Karawang Regency Kabupaten Karawang
- Regency

Other transcription(s)
  - Sundanese: ᮊᮘᮥᮕᮒᮦᮔ᮪ ᮊᮛᮝᮀ
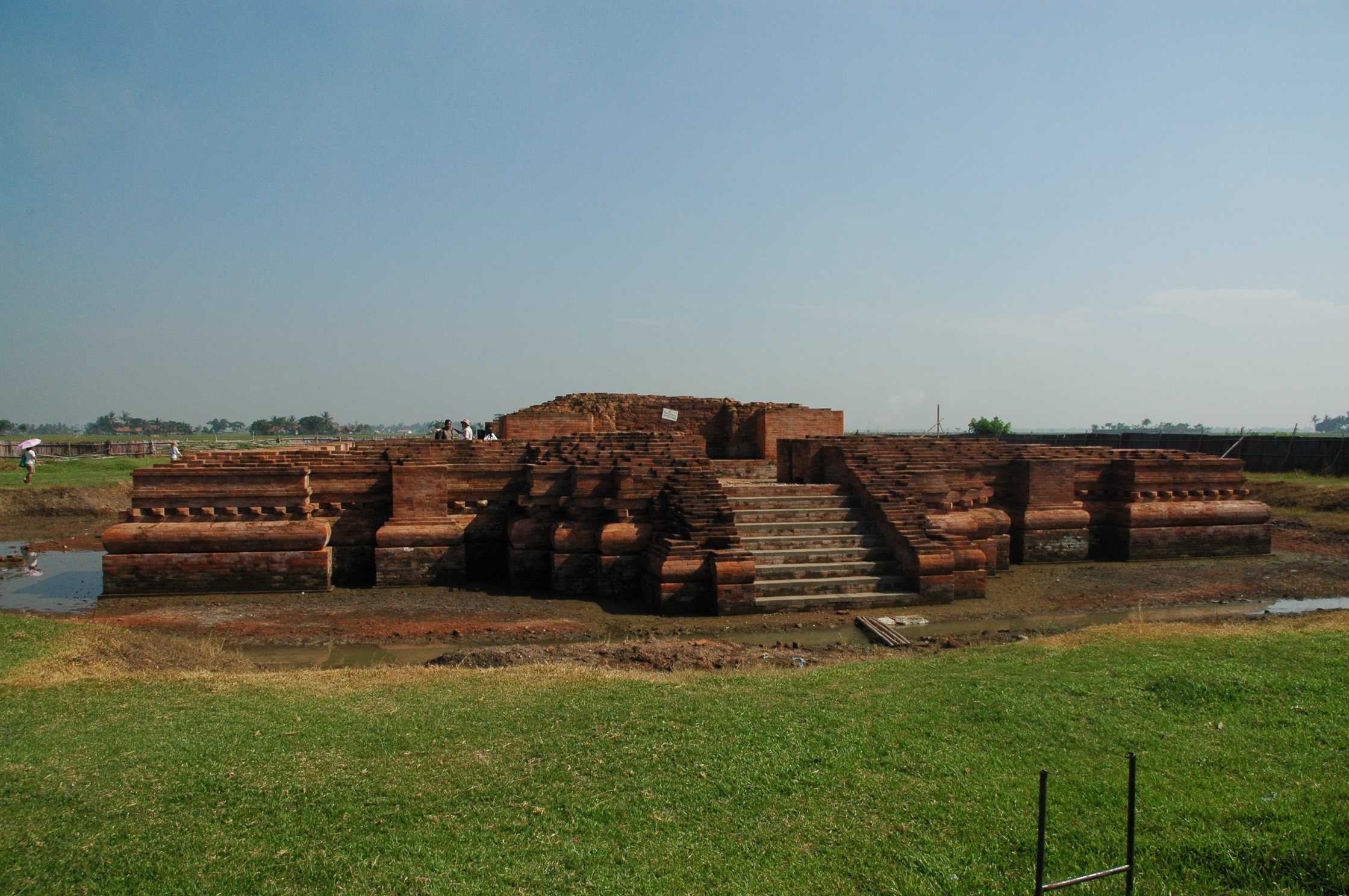
- Batujaya temple

- Coat of arms
- Motto: Pangkal Perjuangan
- Location within West Java

- Location in Java and Indonesia Karawang Regency (Indonesia)
- Coordinates: 6°18′07″S 107°18′17″E
- Country: Indonesia
- Province: West Java

Government
  - Regent: Aep Syaepuloh
  - Vice Regent: Maslani

Area
  - Total: 1,913.71 km^{2} (738.89 sq mi)

Population (mid 2025 official estimate)
  - Total: 2,581,245
  - Density: 1,348.82/km^{2} (3,493.42/sq mi)
- Time zone: UTC+7 (WIB)
- Area code: (+62)267, (+62)264
- Website: karawangkab.go.id

Karawang Regency is a regency (kabupaten) of West Java, Indonesia. The town of Karawang is its administrative centre. The regency covers an area of 1,913.71 km^{2} and had a population of 2,127,791 people at the 2010 Census, which grew to 2,361,019 at the 2020 Census, and continues to grow by about 40,000 new residents each year. The official estimate for mid 2025 was 2,581,245 (comprising 1,302,947 males and 1,278,298 females). The regency borders Bekasi and Bogor Regencies in the west, the Java Sea in the north, Subang Regency in the east, and Purwakarta Regency in the south. The regency lies on the eastern outskirts of Metropolitan Jakarta, just outside the Jabodetabek region, and is the site of considerable industrial activity (like factories).

The area continues to grow following the establishment of new factories by domestic and multinational companies in industrial areas. However, due to ever-expanding of Jakarta's suburbs (primarily from the eastward expansion of the Jakarta-Cikampek Toll Road and the Cikopo-Palimanan Toll Road), it has also seen a heavy influx of housing developments as well as a surge of new residents.

== Administrative districts ==
Karawang Regency is divided into thirty districts (kecamatan) comprising 309 administrative villages (desa and Kelurahan). The districts are listed below with their areas and populations at the 2010 Census and the 2020 Census, together with the official estimate for mid 2025; they are grouped for convenience into four geographical sectors, which have no administrative significance. The table includes the locations of the district headquarters, the number of administrative villages in each district (a total of 297 rural desa and 12 urban kelurahan - for which latter please see West Karawang and East Karawang), and its postal code.

Kode Wilayah	Name of District (kecamatan)	Area in km^{2}	Pop'n 2010 Census	Pop'n 2020 Census	Pop'n mid 2025 Estimate	Admin centre	No. of villages	Post code
32.15.02	Pangkalan	99.66	35,245	38,408	43,205	Ciptasari	8	41362
32.15.28	Tegalwaru	52.14	34,154	37,626	41,095	Cintalaksana	9	41364
32.15.04	Ciampel	117.10	39,340	44,104	46,141	Kutapohaci	7	41363
32.15.03	Telukjambe Timur (East Telukjambe)	47.21	126,616	135,914	136,022	Telukjambe	9	41360
32.15.27	Telukjambe Barat (West Telukjambe)	70.92	48,803	54,957	58,369	Karangmulya	10	41361
32.15.05	Klari	73.65	155,336	181,111	216,547	Duren	13	41371
Sub-totals	South sector	460.68	439,494	492,120	538,379		56	
32.15.13	Cikampek	36.34	107,020	115,369	124,802	Dawuan Tengah	10	41373
32.15.29	Purwasari	32.15	63,274	75,934	88,646	Sukasari	8	41377
32.15.16	Tirtamulya	46.52	44,274	49,599	52,552	Citarik	10	41372
32.15.14	Jatisari	55.34	72,003	78,565	84,279	Mekarsari	14	41375
32.15.24	Banyusari	55.46	51,012	55,425	58,390	Gembongan	12	41374
32.15.25	Kotabaru	33.31	119,710	131,136	145,394	Wancimekar	9	41376
32.15.15	Cilamaya Wetan	78.17	75,318	78,279	82,241	Mekarmaya	12	41386
32.15.23	Cilamaya Kulon	68.33	59,780	64,566	68,632	Sukamulya	12	41384
Sub-totals	East sector	405.62	592,391	648,873	704,936		87	
32.15.19	Lemahabang	53.44	60,758	64,711	68,390	Karangtanjung	11	41383
32.15.17	Telagasari	105.70	60,163	68,183	72,713	Telagasari	14	41381
32.15.21	Majalaya	33.54	44,016	64,557	92,077	Majalaya	7	41370
32.15.26	Karawang Timur (East Karawang)	30.77	118,001	146,326	170,076	Adiarsa Timur (East Adiarsa)	8	41313 & 41314
32.15.01	Karawang Barat (West Karawang)	39.52	155,471	161,554	167,026	Tanjungmekar	8	41311 & 41312, 42315 & 41316
32.15.18	Rawamerta	50.32	48,657	53,608	56,454	Sukamerta	13	41382
32.15.20	Tempuran	93.57	58,608	64,976	67,762	Pancakarya	14	41385
Sub-totals	Central sector	406.86	545,674	623,915	695,298		75	
32.15.07	Kutawaluya	54.60	53,741	59,086	63,664	Waluya	12	41358
32.15.06	Rengasdengklok	37.68	104,494	109,718	120,948	Rengasdengklok; Selatan (South; Rengasdengklok)	9	41352
32.15.22	Jayakerta	43.50	59,929	65,557	70,513	Jayamakmur	8	41351
32.15.10	Pedes	66.05	70,168	78,187	82,729	Payungsari	12	41353
32.15.30	Cilebar	71.93	39,421	43,494	47,349	Kertamukti	10	41350
32.15.11	Cibuaya	118.22	48,660	52,050	55,302	Pejaten	11	41356
32.15.09	Tirtajaya	105.40	61,919	70,166	73,538	Sabajaya	11	41357
32.15.08	Batujaya	75.19	75,336	77,966	83,050	Batujaya	10	41354
32.15.12	Pakisjaya	68.38	36,564	39,887	42,539	Tanjungbungin	8	41355
Sub-totals	North sector	640.95	550,232	596,111	639,632		91	
	Totals	1,913.71	2,127,791	2,361,019	2,581,245	Karawang	309	

The 12 urban villages (kelurahan) comprise all 8 villages in Karawang Barat District (Adiarsa Barat, Karangpawitan, Karawang Kulon, Mekarjati, Nagasari, Tanjungmekar, Tanjungpura and Tunggakjati), plus 4 (out of 8 villages) in Karawang Timur District (Adiarsa Timur, Karawang Wetan, Palumbonsari and Plawad).

== History ==
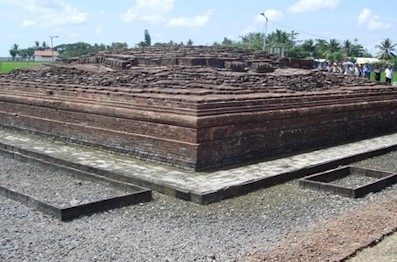
Batujaya temple

On 9 December 1947, a massacre was carried out in Rawagede (now located in the village of Balongsari, Rawamerta, Karawang), between Karawang and Bekasi, by the Royal Netherlands East Indies Army. A total of 431 residents became victims of this massacre.

In November 2026, allegations arose following the release of drug dealers following a operation conducted by the Karawang police in October 2026, due to the abuse of power, the drug dealers were released.

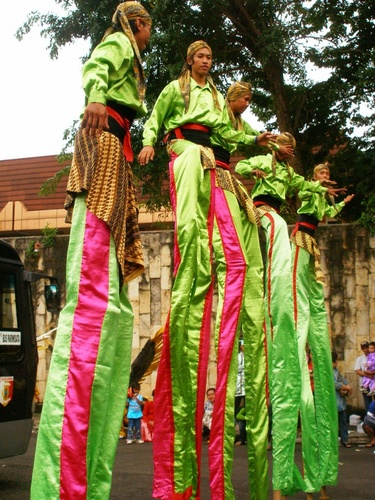
Karawang dancers on stilts

== Topography ==
Most of Karawang Regency consists of a broad coastal plain; it lies on the northern coast of Java and is the result of the deposition of sedimentary rocks formed by loose materials, especially marine sediments and volcanic alluvium. While in the middle of the regency are hills mostly formed by sedimentary rocks, in the south there is a mountain with a height of about 1,291 m (4,236 ft). The regency is roughly equidistant from Jakarta and Bandung, and the two metropolitan areas have a combined home population of over 40 million people.

== Demography ==
The estimated population in mid 2025 was 2,581,245, comprising 1,302,947 males and 1,278,298 females. The general population is ethnically Sundanese, with Islam adherents comprising 98.17% of the population according to the 2010 census.

== Sport ==
The football club Persika Karawang, which plays in Liga 2, is based in Karawang's Singaperbangsa Stadium. The city had also hosted the Madura United F.C. between 2010 and 2012 when it was known as Pelita Jaya Karawang.

== Industrial estates ==
Currently, according to the data of the Indonesian Industrial Zone Association (HKI), there are at least nine major industrial areas, namely Karawang New Industry City (KNIC), Karawang International Industrial City (KIIC), Bukit Indah City, Surya Cipta Industrial Area, Karawang Jabar Industrial Estate, Podomoro Industrial Park, Kujang Industrial Area, Karawang Mitrakarawang Industry, GT Tech Park Karawang, and Artha Industrial Hill.

== New airport ==
A new main airport for Greater Jakarta and the heavily populated surrounding area was planned for bids in 2014; the site is located within the regency (in Ciampel and Pangkalan districts), to provide relief to severely congested Soekarno–Hatta International Airport, the nation's largest gateway, as well as overloaded Husein Sastranegara International Airport in Bandung. The new airport is expected to have space for 4 long runways 2,136 by 19 metres (7,008 ft × 62 ft) and 2 jumbo terminals. The current airport takes up some 18 square kilometers of land, in all likelihood a similar allocation of land will be required.

== Transportation ==
Trans-Java main rail line runs across the central part of the Regency, with a stop at Karawang Station. Likewise, Jakarta's main airport is also mulled for the regency. The Jakarta–Cikampek Toll Road runs through the regency, connecting to the Cipularang Toll Road which goes to Purwakarta and Bandung. This district is also crossed by the fast Jakarta-Bandung train line.

== Karawang adipati (regents) during the Mataram and colonial periods ==
1. Prince Singaperbangsa (1633-1677), under the title Adipati Kertabumi III
2. Raden Anom Wirasuta (1677-1721), son of Singaperbangsa
3. Raden Jayanegara (1721-1731), son of Wirasuta, under the title Adipati Panatayuda II
4. Raden Singanegara (1752-1786), son of Jayanegara, under the title Adipati Panatayuda IV
5. Raden Singasari (1786-1809), son-in-law of Singanegara, under the title Raden Adipati Aria Singasari
6. Raden Aria Sastradipura (1809-1811), son of Singanegara
7. Raden Adipati Suryalaga (1811-1813), eldest son of Raden Adipati Suryalaga, adipati of Sumedang
8. Raden Aria Sastradipura (1811-1820), son of Singanegara
9. Raden Adipati Suryanata (1821-1829), son-in-law of Sastradipura
10. Raden Adipati Suryawinata (1829-1849), younger brother of Suryanata
11. Raden Muhammad Enoh (1849-1854), under the title Raden Sastranegara
12. Raden Adipati Sumadipura (1854-1863), son of Sastradipura, under the title Raden Tumenggung Aria Sastradiningrat I, builds the pendopo (regent palace) and the Grand Mosque of Purwakarta
13. Raden Adikusumah (1883-1886), under the title Raden Adipati Sastradiningrat II
14. Raden Surya Kusumah (1886-1911), son of Adikusumah, under the title Raden Adipati Sastradiningrat III
15. Raden Tumenggung Aria Gandanagara (1911-1925), younger brother of Surya Kusumah, under the title Raden Adipati Sastradiningrat III
16. Raden Adipati Aria Suryamiharja (1925-1942)
17. Raden Panduwinata (1942-1945), under the title Raden Kanjeng Pandu Suriadiningrat, last bupati to reside in Purwakarta, moves to Subang.
