= West Bandung Regency =

Regency in West Java, Indonesia

West Bandung Regency Kabupaten Bandung Barat
- Regency

Regional transcription(s)
  - Sundanese: ᮊᮘᮥᮕᮒᮦᮔ᮪ ᮘᮔ᮪ᮓᮥᮀ ᮊᮥᮜᮧᮔ᮪
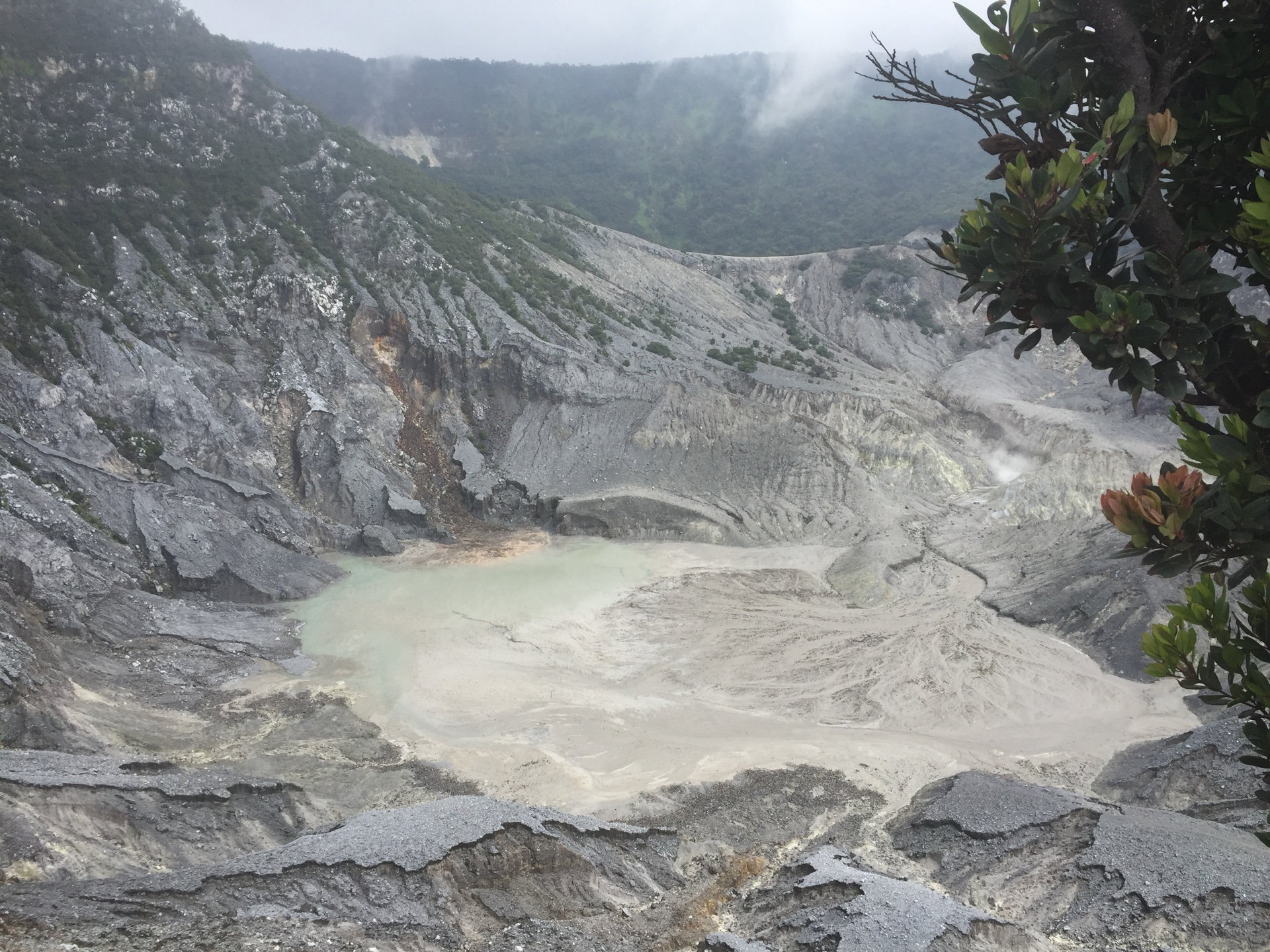
- View of Kawah Ratu at Tangkuban Perahu

- Coat of arms
- Motto: Wibawa Mukti Kerta Raharja ᮝᮤᮘᮝ ᮙᮥᮊ᮪ᮒᮤ ᮊᮨᮁᮒ ᮛᮠᮁᮏ; Prestigious, joyous, fruitful, affluent
- Location within West Java

- Location in Java and Indonesia West Bandung Regency (Indonesia)
- Coordinates: 6°50′21″S 107°30′43″E
- Country: Indonesia
- Province: West Java
- Established: 2007
- Regency seat: Ngamprah

Government
  - Regent: Jeje Ritchie Ismail
  - Vice Regent: Asep Ismail

Area
  - Total: 1,290.06 km^{2} (498.09 sq mi)
- Elevation: 680 m (2,230 ft)

Population (mid 2025 estimate)
  - Total: 1,907,824
  - Density: 1,478.86/km^{2} (3,830.24/sq mi)
- Time zone: UTC+7 (IWST)
- Area code: (+62) 22
- Website: bandungbaratkab.go.id

West Bandung Regency (Kabupaten Bandung Barat) is a landlocked regency of West Java Province of Indonesia. It was established on 2 January 2007, after having been formerly part of Bandung Regency. The capital of this new regency is Ngamprah, an industrial district on the west side of Bandung. The entire regency is included within the Bandung Metropolitan Area.

The area of the regency is 1,290.06 km^{2} and the population was 1,506,448 at the 2010 Census and 1,788,336 at the 2020 Census. The official estimate as at mid 2025 was 1,907,824 (comprising 971,554 males and 936,270 females).

== History ==
The idea of dividing Bandung Regency into two separate regencies originated in 1999, based on a proposal from the current regent (H.U. Hatta Djati Permana) for the parliament to consider and approve the idea of splitting off the western part of the existing Bandung Regency. Before the split-off was successfully completed, the Bandung suburb of Cimahi (an area consisting of three districts, which used to be part of Bandung Regency) had been promoted in 2001 to become an autonomous city. After Cimahi became an autonomous administration, the request to split off the western portion of Bandung Regency as a separate regency grew.

Finally in 2006, the government of Indonesia approved the proposal to separate the western part of Bandung Regency to become a separate regency, the West Bandung Regency. On its birth on 2 January 2007, this new regency in West Java were headed by an appointed acting regent H. Tjatja Kuswara (an officer from West Java provincial government) until April 2008, when the first direct election of West Bandung Regency Regent was held, with H. Abubakar and H. Agus Yasmin as the contestants; H. Abubakar with his running mate Ernawan Natasaputra won the election and became the Regent and Vice-Regent of West Bandung Regency.

== Administration ==
The Regent (Bupati) of West Bandung Regency since 20 February 2025 is Jeje Ritchie Ismail, assisted by his deputy (Wakil Bupati) Asep Ismail.

== Administrative districts ==
At the time of the 2010 Census, West Bandung Regency was divided into fifteen districts (kecamatan), but in October 2011 a sixteenth district (Saguling) was created by the division of the existing Batujajar District. Parongpong and Lembang Districts lie immediately north of Bandung city, and contain many suburbs of the city. The districts (which each bears the name of the town which is its administrative centre) are all listed below with their areas and their populations at the 2010 Census and the 2020 Census, together with the official estimates as at mid 2024. For ease of reference, they are grouped below into three geographical sectors (without any administrative significance). The districts each have the same name as the town that is its administrative centre. The table also includes the number of administrative villages in each district (all 165 classed as rural desa), and its post code(s).

Kode Wilayah	Name of District (kecamatan	Area in km^{2}	Pop'n 2010 Census	Pop'n 2020 Census	Pop'n mid 2025 Estimate	No. of villages	Post code
32.17.13	Rongga	112.25	51,521	60,666	64,591	8	40566
32.17.15	Gununghalu	160.64	68,442	79,175	82,822	9	40565
32.17.14	Sindangkerta	105.97	61,296	73,458	79,918	11	40563
32.17.11	Cililin	77.60	80,235	95,470	103,703	11	40567
32.17.10	Cihampelas	46.90	102,518	132,659	143,895	10	40562
32.17.12	Cipongkor	79.90	81,813	99,991	108,655	14	40564
	Southern sector	583.26	445,825	541,419	583,584	63	
32.17.09	Batujajar	32.04	114,254	107,835	116,878	7	40561
32.17.16	Saguling	51.42	^{(a)}	33,820	37,663	6	40560
32.17.07	Cipatat	126.03	119,376	140,301	152,300	12	40554
32.17.08	Padalarang	51.48	155,534	181,359	190,209	10	40553
32.17.06	Ngamprah	35.55	154,166	177,690	180,603	11	40552
	Central sector	296.52	543,330	641,005	678,653	46	
32.17.02	Parongpong	45.14	97,724	113,005	117,667	7	40559
32.17.01	Lembang	97.97	173,350	197,640	209,084	16	40391
32.17.03	Cisarua	55.47	66,826	79,154	84,651	8	40551
32.17.04	Cikalong Wetan	110.61	108,480	128,106	135,944	13	40556
32.17.05	Cipeundeuy	101.09	74,749	88,007	93,274	12	40558
	Northern sector	410.28	521,129	605,912	640,620	56	
	Totals for Regency	1,290.06	1,506,448	1,788,336	1,902,857	165	

Note: (a) the 2010 population figure for the new Saguling District is included in the figure given for the Batujajar District, from which it was split off in 2011.

== Tourism ==
Tourist destinations are:

- Lembang, northeasternmost district of this regency, is well known for fresh air.
- Maribaya, east of Lembang, an area with fresh air and a waterfall.
- Curug Cimahi, beautiful 85 metres waterfall located near Parongpong District, near Cihideung Village and Vila Istana Bunga, with 687 stairs to the waterfall. A location for the 10th leg of eco-tourism destination of US TV series, The Amazing Race 23.
- Ciwangun Indah Camp, a 22 hectares outbound area mainly for children is located in Colonel Masturi street, Ciwangun, Cihanjuang Rahayu, Parongpong. The location consists of a waterfall, a man-made pond, pines forest, tea plantation and strawberry field.
- Curug Kebul, the tallest waterfall among 7 waterfalls in Curug Malela area.
- Curug Malela, a 70-meter wide and 50-meter tall waterfall at Manglid village, Cicadas desa, Rongga District, West Bandung Regency near Cianjur Regency consists of 5 waterfalls side by side and looked like a silky whitish curtain from afar, 87 kilometres from Bandung, 4 hours using a motorcycle. The waterfall is known also as 'Mini Niagara' can be seen since 1 kilometre away from a musholla and the neareast waterfall can be reached from a parking area.
- Karanghawu Vertical Cave, at Cidadap village, Padalarang District, near Ciburuy lake and 125 cliff, a 90 metres vertical cave with a natural bridge over it.
- Orchid Forest Cikole, a beautiful orchid forest in the slope of Mount Tangkubanparahu.
- Pawon Cave, at Cipatat, a pre-historic cave was used when Old Bandung Lake still existed.
- Situ Lembang, a remote small man-made lake, located between 2 mountains, Mount Tangkubanparahu and Mount Burangrang; it has tremendous natural scenery and unpolluted remote fresh air. The location is a training camp for the Army, so not everyone is able to access it every time.
- Stone Garden, a hill near Padalarang which needs a lot of energy to climb. It is full of big stones or boulders, sometimes cloud through it and below the top of the hill, so the situation is like at Zhangjiajie Mountain in China.
- Waduk Saguling, a man-made lake formed by the Saguling Dam located in the centre of West Bandung Regency, also location of fishing activities. Located in the upper reaches of the Tarum River.
- Waduk Cirata, a man-made lake and dam of Citarum (Tarum River), located in Cipeundeuy District, between Waduk Saguling and Waduk Jatiluhur.
- Situ Ciburuy, a small lake, located on the side of the state road connecting Cianjur and Bandung.
- Situ Lembang, a small remote lake between Mount Burangrang and Mount Tangkubanparahu, special permission to enter is needed because the location is under Indonesian Army control.

West Bandung Regency Administration will build information centres at their leading sites, Maribaya, Situ Ciburuy and Pawon Cave.

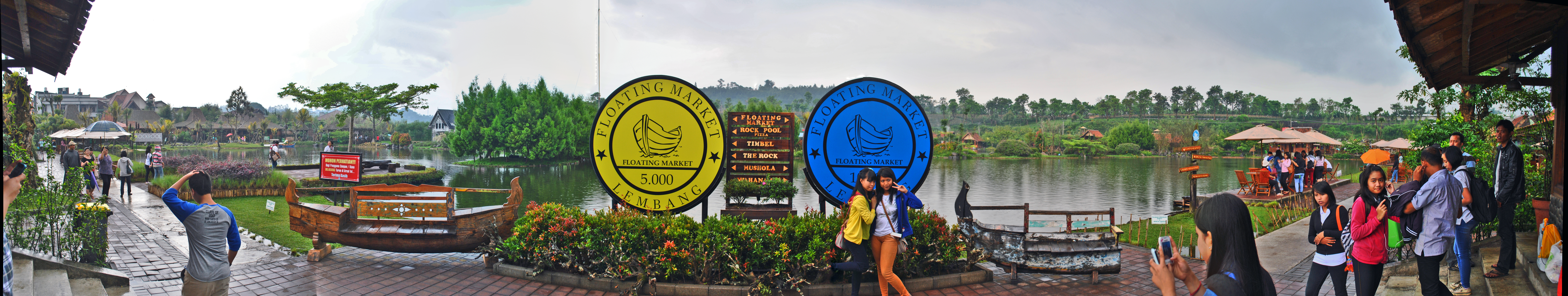
Floating market in Lembang where local foods, snacks and items like clothing are carried by sellers on boats.

== Al Irsyad Mosque ==
The unique Al Irsyad Mosque received the fifth place award in the Building Of The Year 2010, and is located in Kota Baru Parahyangan with a capacity of 1,500 people. The mosque is box-shaped like the Ka'bah with grey colour, but it has many holes on its walls for ventilation and makes 2 sentences of shahada.

== Industry ==
Several industries are located in this area :

- Indofood (Food)
- Otto (Medicine)
- Ultrajaya (Beverage)

== Transport ==
West Bandung Regency position is between Jakarta and Bandung city. It is the place where 2 main state road (Jakarta-Puncak/Sukabumi-Bandung) and (Jakarta-Purwakarta-Bandung) and 2 railroad route (Jakarta-Bandung) and (Cianjur-Bandung) were merged. It also has a connection to other cities using the Jakarta-Bandung intercity highway, with its Padalarang Toll Gate.

It also has a major train station, the Padalarang railway station, where several economy-class intercity and domestic trains stop.

== See also ==
- List of regencies and cities of Indonesia
