= Mayor of Bekasi =

- Wali Kota Bekasi
- Coat of arms of Bekasi

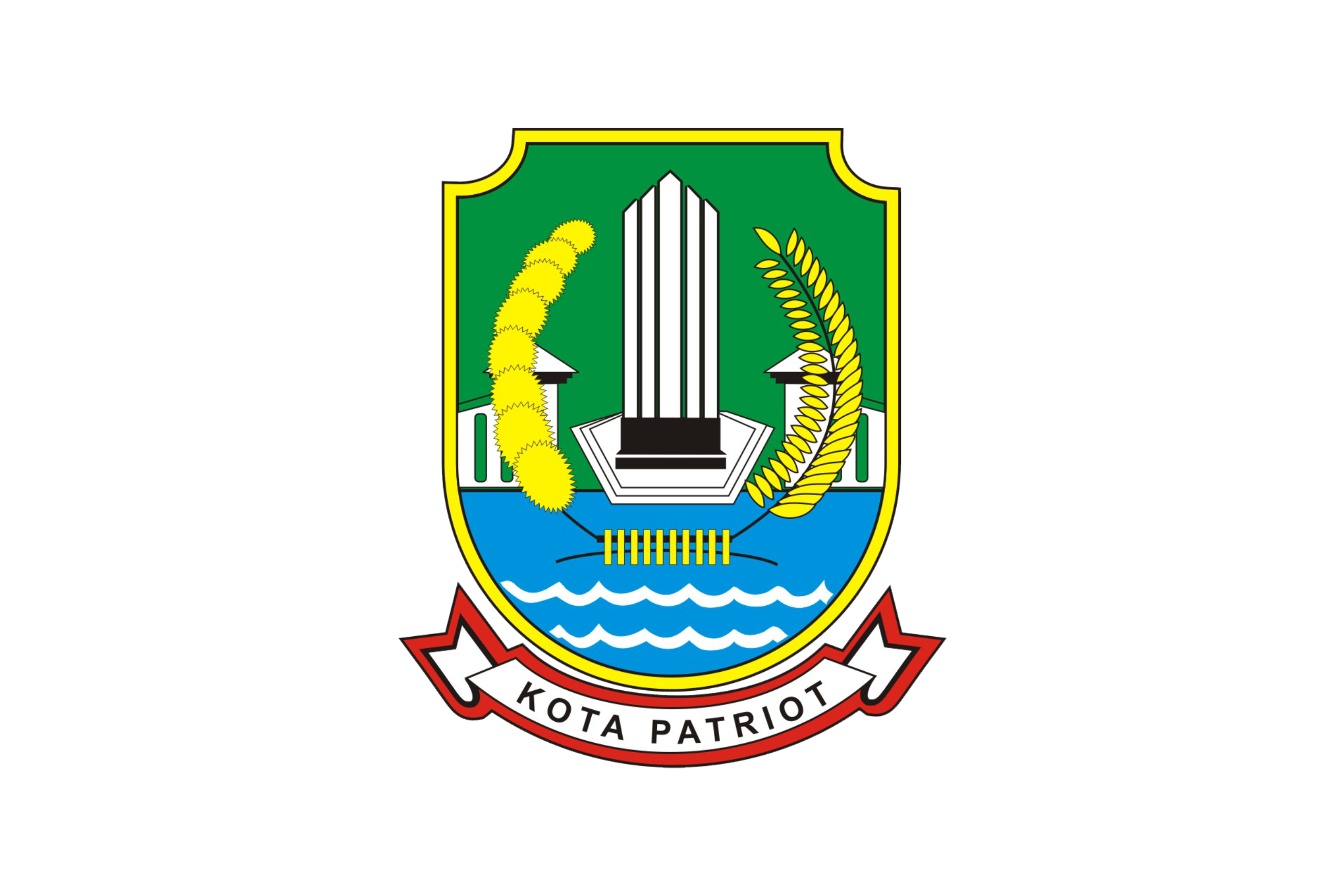
- 120px

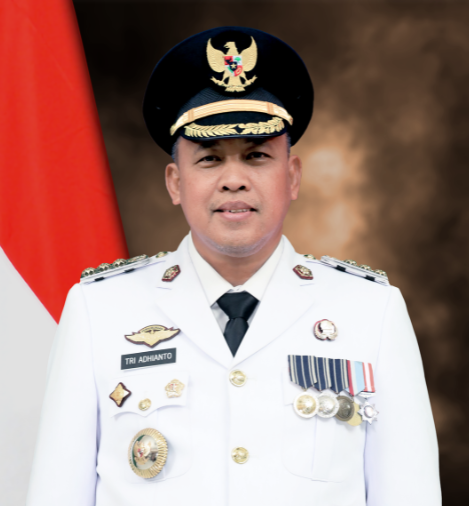
- Incumbent; Tri Adhianto Tjahyono since 20 February 2025
- Term length: 5 years
- Inaugural holder: Soedjono
- Formation: April 20, 1982; 44 years ago
- Website: Official website

Mayor of Bekasi is the head of the second-level region who holds the government in Bekasi together with the Vice Mayor and 50 members of the Bekasi City Regional House of Representatives. The mayor and vice mayor of Bekasi are elected through general elections held every 5 years. The first mayor of Bekasi was Soedjono, who governed the city period from 1982 to 1988.

Before becoming an autonomous city, Bekasi was an administrative city and was part of Bekasi Regency.

== List ==
The following is a list of the names of the Mayors of Bekasi from time to time.

Administrative Mayor of Bekasi
Num.	Portrait	Mayor	Beginning of office	End of Term	Political Party / Faction	Period	Note.	Vice mayor
1		Soedjono	20 April 1982	1988	Golkar (Note: The Joint Secretariat of Golongan Karya was not a political party during the period 1964 to 1998. Golkar is a group of Golkar groups that oversees several Parent Organization Groups (KINO), including the Republic of Indonesia Civil Servant Corps (KORPRI) which includes civil servants. This official was formerly a bureaucrat in the Ministry of Home Affairs of the Republic of Indonesia who was "employed" as an administrative mayor as well as a member of Golkar.)	1		N/A
2		Andi Sukardi	1988	1991	Golkar	2		N/A
3		Khailani A. R.	1991	10 March 1997	Golkar	3		N/A
Mayor of Bekasi
Num.	Portrait	Mayor	Beginning of office	End of Term	Political Party / Faction	Period	Note.	Vice mayor
1		Nonon Sontanie	23 February 1998	10 March 2003	Golkar (until 1999)	4		N/A
1		Nonon Sontanie	23 February 1998	10 March 2003	Independent (since 1999)	4		N/A
2		Akhmad Zurfaih	10 March 2003	10 March 2008	Golkar	5		Mochtar Mohamad (2003–2008)
3		Mochtar Mohamad	10 March 2008	3 May 2012	PDI-P	6 (2008)		Rahmat Effendi (2008–2012)
4		Rahmat Effendi	10 March 2013	15 February 2018	Golkar	7 (2012)	(Note: From 15 February to 10 March 2018, Rahmat and his vice, Ahmad Syaikhu, applied for leave during the nomination process for the regional head elections and were temporarily filled by an acting official, namely Ruddy Gandakusumah.)	Ahmad Syaikhu (2013–2018)
4		Rahmat Effendi	20 September 2018	7 January 2022	Golkar	8 (2018)		Tri Adhianto Tjahyono (2018–2022)
5	Tri Adhianto Tjahyono, Wali Kota Bekasi (2025)	Tri Adhianto Tjahyono	21 August 2023	20 September 2023	PDI-P	8 (2018)		N/A
5	Tri Adhianto Tjahyono, Wali Kota Bekasi (2025)	Tri Adhianto Tjahyono	20 February 2025	Incumbent	PDI-P	9 (2024)		Abdul Harris Bobihoe (2025–now)

== Temporary replacement ==
In the government stack, a regional head who submits himself to leave or temporarily resigns from his position to the central government, then the Minister of Home Affairs prepares a replacement who is a bureaucrat in the regional government or even a vice mayor, including when the mayor's position is in a transition period.

Portrait	Mayor	Party	Beginning	End	Duration	Period	Definitive	Ref.
	Khailani A. R. (Acting)	Golkar	10 March 1997	23 February 1998	–	350 days	Transition	
	Rahmat Effendi (Acting Officer)	Golkar	3 May 2012	10 March 2013	6 (2008)	311 days	Transition	
	Ruddy Gandakusumah (Acting)	Independent	15 February 2018	10 March 2018	7 (2012)	23 days	Rahmat Effendi (2013–2018)	
	Rayendra Sukarmadji (Daily executive)	Independent	10 March 2018	13 March 2018	–	3 days	N/A	
	Ruddy Gandakusumah (Acting)	Independent	13 March 2018	31 August 2018	–	171 days	N/A	
	Toto Mohamad Toha (Acting)	Independent	31 August 2018	20 September 2018	–	20 days	N/A	
	Tri Adhianto Tjahyono (Acting Officer)	PDI-P	7 January 2022	21 August 2023	8 (2018)	1 year, 226 days	N/A	
	Raden Gani Muhamad (Acting)	Independent	20 September 2023	20 February 2025	–	1 year, 153 days	N/A	

== See also ==
- Bekasi
- List of incumbent regional heads and deputy regional heads in West Java
