= 2024 West Java gubernatorial election =

- 27 November 2024
- Turnout: 65.98% (▼4.32pp)
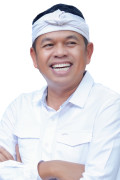

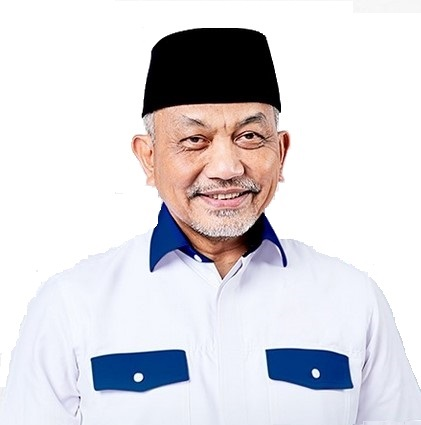

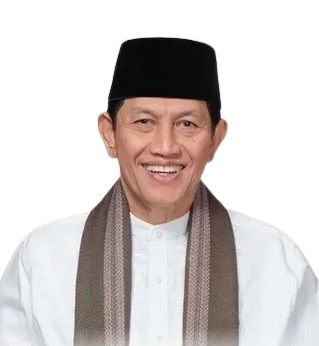

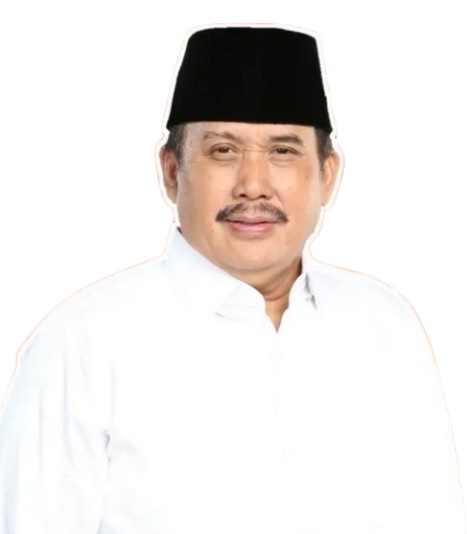
Candidate	Dedi Mulyadi	Ahmad Syaikhu
Party	Gerindra	PKS
Alliance	KIM Plus	–
Running mate	Erwan Setiawan	Ilham Habibie
Popular vote	14,130,192	4,260,072
Percentage	62.22%	18.76%
Candidate	Acep Adang Ruhiat	Jeje Wiradinata
Party	PKB	PDI-P
Running mate	Gitalis Dwi Natarina	Ronal Surapradja
Popular vote	2,204,452	2,116,017
Percentage	9.71%	9.32%
- Results map by district
Governor before election
Bey Triadi Machmudin (acting)
Independent
Elected Governor
Dedi Mulyadi
Gerindra

The 2024 West Java gubernatorial election was held on 27 November 2024 as part of nationwide local elections to elect the Governor of West Java for the 2025 to 2030 term. The election was held as part of local elections for governors, regents, and mayors across 36 other provinces in Indonesia.

Ridwan Kamil, the previous governor-elect, was eligible to run for a second term, but he chose to run in Jakarta gubernatorial election because he was supported by parties supporting President Prabowo Subianto from the Advanced Indonesia Coalition Plus (KIM Plus). Finally, there were four candidates who participated in the election, the KIM Plus candidate in West Java Dedi Mulyadi-Erwan Setiawan, the PKS and NasDem candidates Ahmad Syaikhu-Ilham Habibie, the PKB candidate, Acep Adang-Gitalis and the PDI-P candidate Jeje Wiradinata-Ronal Surapradja.

The Dedi-Erwan pair emerged victorious, winning 62.22% of the vote. The pair also won all districts and cities.

== Background ==
The election, originally scheduled for 2023, was postponed for one years following a 2016 ruling by the General Elections Commission that all 2024 regional elections are to be held on the same day. As a result, when the then-elected governor of West Java, Ridwan Kamil, completed his term on 5 September 2023, Bey Machmudin was appointed acting governor.

== Electoral system ==
The election, like other local elections in 2024, follow the first-past-the-post system where the candidate with the most votes wins the election, even if they do not win a majority. It is possible for a candidate to run uncontested, in which case the candidate is still required to win a majority of votes "against" an "empty box" option. Should the candidate fail to do so, the election will be repeated on a later date.

== Candidates ==
According to electoral regulations, in order to qualify for the election, candidates were required to secure support from 24 seats in the West Java Regional House of Representatives (DPRD). As none of the parties won 24 or more seats in the 2024 election, coalitions of multiple parties are required to nominate a candidate. Candidates may alternatively demonstrate support in form of photocopies of identity cards, which in West Java's case corresponds to 2.32 million copies. No independent candidates registered with the General Elections Commission for the gubernatorial election.

However, on 20 August 2024 the Constitutional Court of Indonesia issued ruling No. 60/PUU-XXII/2024 and MK decision No. 70/PUU-XXII/2024 which granted part of the lawsuit filed by the Labor Party and the Gelora Party against the local election law. This decision was stated in PKPU Number 8 of 2024. This ruling lowers the requirement to 6,5% for political parties to announce their own candidate pairings. Based on this new ruling, Gerindra Party, Golkar, PDI-P, National Awakening Party, Prosperous Justice Party and the Democratic Party can name their own pairs of candidates without the need to form coalitions.

=== Declared ===
These are candidates who have been allegedly delegated by political parties endorsing for gubernatorial election:

1
Candidate from PKB
Acep Adang Ruhiat	Gitalis Dwi Natarina
for Governor	for Vice Governor
Member of the House of Representatives (2014–present)	Member of the House of Representatives (2011–2014)
Parties
15 / 120 (13%) PKB (15 seats)

PKB and Indonesian Democratic Party of Struggle had already agreed to back Ono Surono as Governor with Acep Adang Ruhiat as his running mate on 15 August 2024. Initially, Acep planned to run for Regent of Tasikmalaya prior to this announcement.

However with the new ruling issued by the Constitutional Court of Indonesia, PKB decided to leave the coalition agreement with PDI-P and field their own candidates with Acep running as governor and accompanied by Gitalis Dwi Natarina as his running mate. Gitalis is a member of House of Representatives from 2011 to 2014.

2
Candidate from PDIP
Jeje Wiradinata	Ronal Surapradja
for Governor	for Vice Governor
Regent of Pangandaran (2016–present)	Actor, comedian, musician, radio host, and broadcaster
Parties
17 / 120 (14%) PDIP (17 seats)

PDI-P initially backed Ono Surono, who was the party chief in West Java, to be a candidate for either Governor or Vice Governor. Ono Surono has even communicated with several parties to ensure his candidacy. PKB and Indonesian Democratic Party of Struggle had already agreed to back Ono Surono as Governor with Acep Adang Ruhiat as his running mate on 15 August 2024.

However with the new ruling issued by the Constitutional Court of Indonesia, PKB decided to leave the coalition agreement with PDI-P and field their own candidates with Acep running as governor. In reaction to this, on the night of the same day PDI-P announced that they will nominate Anies Baswedan as Governor of West Java with Ono running as Vice Governor. However, Anies through his spokesperson said he declined to run.

At the last registration time, PDI-P nominated Jeje Wiradinata and Ronal Surapradja as the gubernatorial and deputy gubernatorial candidates from PDI-P. Jeje and Ronal did not come directly to the KPU but only attended online via Zoom. Registration was represented by Ono Surono as the Chairperson of the PDI-P West Java DPD, and a Member of the West Java Regional House of Representatives from PDI-P, Abdy Yuhana. During the candidate registration, Ono Surono blamed his failure to nominate Anies because of alleged intervention from outside forces.

Since yesterday we have offered Mr. Anies until it was narrowed down this afternoon. Why did it fail? We are facing a very big challenge, sides that do not agree that Mr. Anies is supported by PDI-P. (Who sir?) Yes, Mulyono and the gang. Yes, just write Mulyono. We know that Mr. Anies is a native from Kuningan, West Java and has a good track record building Jakarta. So, I'm sure (he) can build West Java. But that larger force made Mr. Anies not to be nominated by PDI-P.

— Ono Surono

Anies Baswedan however explained his decision to not run saying that there is no popular aspiration present in the people of West Java unlike in Jakarta and thanked PDI-P for the offer. PDI-P secretary general Hasto Kristiyanto also echoed Ono's statement, saying there is no dissent within the party ranks. He also revealed that Jeje Wiradinata is initially to be paired with Ono Surono while the current pair is proposed as a backup. Hasto however tasked Ono Surono to take part in the leadership of the West Java Regional House of Representatives as well as being the campaign manager for Jeje-Ronal.

3
Candidate from PKS and Nasdem
Ahmad Syaikhu	Ilham Habibie
for Governor	for Vice Governor
President of Prosperous Justice Party (2020–present); 2018 vice gubernatorial nominee	Son of 3rd President of Indonesia B. J. Habibie
Parties
33 / 120 (28%) PKS (19 seats); Nasdem (8 seats); PPP (6 seats)

For some time, the NasDem Party has supported Ilham Habibie, son of 3rd President of Indonesia B. J. Habibie, to enter the election. NasDem then approached fellow coalition member Prosperous Justice Party to form a coalition in this election. Both parties had agreed to form a coalition by naming the President of Prosperous Justice Party Ahmad Syaikhu as Governor and Ilham his running mate.

The pair was declared on 29 August 2024 after the pair make a pilgrimage trip to the tomb of President B. J. Habibie in Kalibata Heroes' Cemetery. On the occasion, the United Development Party declared their support for the pair.

4
Candidate from Gerindra and Golkar
Dedi Mulyadi	Erwan Setiawan
for Governor	for Vice Governor
Member of the House of Representatives (2019–2023); 2018 vice gubernatorial nominee	Vice Regent of Sumedang (2018–2023)
Parties
55 / 120 (46%) Gerindra (20 seats); Golkar (19 seats); Demokrat (8 seats); PAN (7 seats); PSI (1 seat)

Initially, many media speculation has said that Ridwan Kamil will run for reelection and he has a high electability rating even reaching 50% in the polls. However, the Advanced Indonesia Coalition spearheaded by Gerindra Party recommended Ridwan Kamil to run for Governor of Jakarta. This recommendation gave Golkar, the party in which Ridwan Kamil is from, a dilemma on Ridwan's candidacy in either province.

Golkar used the polls to justify Ridwan Kamil's candidacy in either Jakarta or West Java. Previously, Golkar gave him a mandate to run in either province. In Jakarta however, Golkar named Jusuf Hamka as Governor of Jakarta. Jusuf's candidacy opened up a potential candidacy by Kaesang Pangarep, younger son of President Joko Widodo and Chairman of Indonesian Solidarity Party, as Jusuf's running mate in order to create the pairing of "Ka'bah", a portmanteau between Kaesang's name and Jusuf's popular nickname, Babah Alun. On 8 August 2024, Ridwan was given the mandate to run in Jakarta, while Jusuf runs in West Java. Ridwan's candidacy in Jakarta ended all speculation on his reelection bid in West Java. Later, Jusuf abruptly resigned from Golkar after Airlangga Hartarto announced that he will step down as Chairman of Golkar, ending his candidacy.

On the other side, Gerindra Party named Dedi Mulyadi, an ex-Golkar politician now a member of Gerindra, to be named as candidate for Governor. In the polls, Dedi Mulyadi ranks second behind Ridwan Kamil. Gerindra justified the polls to push Ridwan's candidacy in Jakarta and Dedi's candidacy in West Java. Finally, after Ridwan Kamil was nominated by Advanced Indonesia Coalition Plus became a candidate for governor of Jakarta. Dedi Mulyadi was nominated by the Advanced Indonesia Coalition Plus to be a candidate for governor of West Java, awaiting Golkar to name a running mate for Dedi.

On 25 August 2024, Dedi Mulyadi and Golkar announced the candidate for deputy governor to accompany Dedi Mulyadi. Golkar appointed the former Deputy Regent of Sumedang who is also the son of Persib Bandung Manager Umuh Muchtar, namely Erwan Setiawan, as a candidate for Vice Governor with Dedi Mulyadi.

=== Potential ===
The following are individuals who have either been publicly mentioned as a potential candidate, or considered as such by press:

- Ridwan Kamil (Golkar), former governor.
- Uu Ruzhanul Ulum (PPP), former vice governor.
- Bima Arya Sugiarto (PAN), former mayor of Bogor.
- Desy Ratnasari (PAN), member of House of Representatives representing West Java IV district (Sukabumi and Sukabumi Regency).
- Cellica Nurrachadiana (Demokrat), former regent of Karawang.
- Syaiful Huda (PKB), member of the House of Representatives representing West Java VII district (Bekasi Regency, Karawang and Purwakarta) and deputy secretary-general of PKB.
- Ono Surono (PDI-P), member of House of Representatives representing West Java VIII district (Cirebon, Cirebon Regency and Indramayu).

=== Declined ===
The following are the individuals who have been publicly declined to run or ran for another elected office:

- Anies Baswedan, Governor of Jakarta (2017–2022) and candidate of 2024 Indonesian presidential election

== Endorsements ==
Acep Adang Ruhiat - Gitalis Dwi Natarina

Member of Parliament

- Syaiful Huda, Member of DPR-RI
- Tommy Kurniawan, Member of DPR-RI

Organizations

- Barisan Olot Masyarakat Adat (Boma)
Jeje Wiradinata - Ronald Surapradja

Member of Parliament

- Rieke Diah Pitaloka, actress and member of DPR-RI
- Denny Cagur, Comedian and member of DPR-RI

Other

- Budi Dalton, actor
Ahmad Syaikhu - Ilham Habibie

Provincial Officials

- Ahmad Heryawan, former Governor of West Java
- Uu Ruzhanul Ulum, previous Vice Governor of West Java
- Anies Baswedan, former Governor of Jakarta and 2024 presidential candidate

Member of Parliament

- Netty Herawati, member of DPR-RI

Organizations

- DDII Jawa Barat
- Komunitas Purna Kepala Desa Seluruh Indonesia Purwakarta
- Organisasi Angkutan Darat
Dedi Mulyadi - Erwan Setiawan

Executive Branch

- Prabowo Subianto, 8th President of Indonesia

Member of Parliament

- Desy Ratnasari, actress, singer and member of DPR-RI
- Mulan Jameela, singer and member of DPR-RI
- Melly Goeslaw, singer and member of DPR-RI
- Nisya Ahmad, member of DPRD of West Java

Other

- Sule Sutisna, singer, actor, comedian
- Doel Sumbang, singer
- Ohang, singer and comedian

== Political map ==
Following the 2024 Indonesian general election, ten political parties are represented in the West Java Regional House of Representatives:

Political parties	Amount		
Political parties	Seat(s)	%	▲ ▼ (2019)
Great Indonesia Movement Party (Gerindra)	20 / 120	16.8%	▼5
Prosperous Justice Party (PKS)	19 / 120	14.8%	▼2
Party of Functional Groups (Golkar)	19 / 120	14.0%	▲3
Indonesian Democratic Party of Struggle (PDI-P)	17 / 120	11.5%	▼3
National Awakening Party (PKB)	15 / 120	11.1%	▲3
NasDem Party	8 / 120	6.1%	▲4
Democratic Party (Demokrat)	8 / 120	6.7%	▼4
National Mandate Party (PAN)	7 / 120	6.3%	Steady
United Development Party (PPP)	6 / 120	4.5%	▲3
Indonesian Solidarity Party (PSI)	1 / 120	2.6%	▲1

== Opinion polls ==
=== Pre-election polls ===
Poll source	Date	Sample size	Error margin															
Poll source	Date	Sample size	Error margin	Yasin	Syaikhu	Komeng	Anies	Atalia	Bima	Deddy	Yusuf	KDM	Desy	Giring	Ilham	Ono	RK	Uu
Saiful Mujani Research and Consulting (open)	27 May–2 June 2024	810	± 3.5%	—N/a	—N/a	—N/a	—N/a	—N/a	1.3%	0.9%	—N/a	16.3%	—N/a	—N/a	—N/a	—N/a	25.2%	—N/a
Saiful Mujani Research and Consulting (semi-open)	27 May–2 June 2024	810	± 3.5%	—N/a	—N/a	—N/a	—N/a	—N/a	—N/a	3.8%	1.9%	28.9%	—N/a	—N/a	—N/a	—N/a	52.5%	—N/a
Litbang Kompas	15–20 June 2024	500	± 4.38%	—N/a	1%	0.8%	—N/a	1.6%	1.6%	0.8%	—N/a	12,2%	0.8%	0.4%	0.3%	0.7%	36.6%	—N/a
Indikator Politik Indonesia	20–27 June 2024	1,214	± 2.8%	0.3%	—N/a	0.8%	0.4%	0.5%	—N/a	—N/a	—N/a	11.2%	—N/a	0.4%	0.3%	0.7%	16%	0.2%
Lembaga Studi Visi Nusantara	22–26 July 2024	800	± 4%	—N/a	1%	—N/a	—N/a	—N/a	14.13%	1.88%	7.63%	2.13%	18.5%	—N/a	21.25%	1.13%	28.8%	—N/a

=== Election polls ===
Pollster	Fieldwork date	Sample size	Margin of error				
Pollster	Fieldwork date	Sample size	Margin of error	Acep PKB	Jeje PDI-P	Syaikhu PKS	Dedi Gerindra
Indikator Politik Indonesia	2–8 September 2024	1,200	± 2.9%	2.24%	2.24%	10.98%	77.81%
Poltracking Indonesia	8-14 September 2024	1,200	± 2.9%	5.2%	2.9%	11.8%	65.9%
Indikator Politik Indonesia	3–12 October 2024	1,200	± 2.9%	4.2%	2.7%	13.8%	75.7%
Lingkar Survei Indonesia (LSI) Denny JA	31 October–4 November 2024	800	± 3.5%	6.5%	5.3%	12.0%	74.6%
Litbang Kompas	1–9 November 2024	630	± 3.9%	4.1%	4.6%	9.0%	65.0%
11 November 2024	First gubernatorial debate						
Indikator Politik Indonesia	14–20 November 2024	800	± 3.5%	4.4%	4.0%	16.4%	71.5%
16 November 2024	Second gubernatorial debate						

== Results ==
=== Quick count results ===
Source	Candidate				Sample entry
Source	Acep A. Ruhiat	Jeje Wiradinata	Ahmad Syaikhu	Dedi Mulyadi	Sample entry
Indikator Politik Indonesia	9.67%	9.10%	20.07%	61.16%	100%
Litbang Kompas	10.25%	9.10%	19.41%	61.24%	100%
LSI-Denny JA	10.40%	8.98%	18.78%	61.85%	100%

=== Official result ===
Candidate	Running mate	Party	Votes	%
Dedi Mulyadi	Erwan Setiawan	Gerindra Party	14,130,192	62.22
Ahmad Syaikhu	Ilham Akbar Habibie	Prosperous Justice Party	4,260,072	18.76
Acep Adang Ruhiat	Gitalis Dwi Natarina	National Awakening Party	2,204,452	9.71
Jeje Wiradinata	Ronal Surapradja	Indonesian Democratic Party of Struggle	2,116,017	9.32
Total			22,710,733	100.00
Valid votes			22,710,733	95.81
Invalid votes			993,052	4.19
Total votes			23,703,785	100.00
Registered voters/turnout			35,925,960	65.98
Source: Official results

=== Results by regency and city ===
Administrative city and regency									Valid votes	Invalid votes	Total votes	Turnout	Registered voters
Administrative city and regency	Acep A. Ruhiat PKB		Jeje Wiradinata PDI-P		Ahmad Syaikhu PKS		Dedi Mulyadi Gerindra		Valid votes	Invalid votes	Total votes	Turnout	Registered voters
Administrative city and regency	Votes	%	Votes	%	Votes	%	Votes	%	Valid votes	Invalid votes	Total votes	Turnout	Registered voters
Regency
Bandung	162,458	8.69%	171,416	9.17%	266,018	14.23%	1,270,105	67.92%	1,869,997	58,640	1,928,637	72.39%	2,664,172
Bekasi	92,878	6.40%	134,298	9.26%	374,408	25.82%	848,654	58.52%	1,450,238	52,520	1,502,758	66.73%	2,251,856
Bogor	254,342	11.57%	175,866	8.00%	392,306	17.85%	1,374,960	62.57%	2,197,474	110,528	2,308,002	58.79%	3,926,080
Ciamis	56,282	8.52%	75,267	11.40%	151,510	22.94%	377,387	57.14%	660,446	22,739	683,185	71.09%	960,995
Cianjur	150,151	14.14%	93,904	8.84%	152,662	14.38%	665,195	62.64%	1,061,912	59,209	1,121,121	61.71%	1,816,668
Cirebon	93,846	9.60%	154,820	15.84%	177,715	18.18%	551,163	56.38%	977,544	61,804	1,039,348	59.59%	1,744,235
Garut	205,363	15.08%	120,166	8.82%	181,436	13.32%	854,948	62.78%	1,361,913	58,453	1,420,366	70.84%	2,005,168
Indramayu	96,739	11.10%	128,987	14.80%	139,875	16.04%	506,191	58.06%	871,792	35,573	907,365	65.25%	1,390,569
Karawang	110,826	9.29%	119,964	10.05%	110,627	9.27%	851,692	71.38%	1,193,109	59,998	1,253,107	69.54%	1,801,870
Kuningan	61,391	11.05%	53,735	9.67%	119,531	21.51%	321,160	57.78%	555,817	29,868	585,685	65.66%	891,960
Majalengka	72,197	9.91%	69,702	9.57%	96,921	13.31%	489,355	67.20%	728,175	36,726	764,901	76.46%	1,000,378
Pangandaran	26,953	10.72%	58,513	23.27%	24,541	9.76%	141,450	56.25%	251,457	10,714	262,171	78.39%	334,425
Purwakarta	27,200	5.24%	25,419	4.90%	81,510	15.70%	384,923	74.16%	519,052	28,087	547,139	74.04%	738,968
Subang	51,921	6.43%	86,582	10.72%	56,096	6.95%	612,767	75.90%	807,366	35,871	843,237	70.34%	1,198,736
Sukabumi	113,079	10.67%	139,223	13.13%	161,328	15.22%	646,563	60.99%	1,060,193	64,006	1,124,199	56.68%	1,983,406
Sumedang	50,319	7.86%	48,923	7.64%	72,990	11.40%	468,011	73.10%	640,243	23,921	664,164	74.27%	894,295
Tasikmalaya	167,507	17.90%	61,350	6.56%	177,468	18.96%	529,516	56.58%	935,841	30,435	966,276	68.10%	1,418,938
West Bandung	55,531	6.07%	94,304	10.30%	127,216	13.90%	638,500	69.74%	915,551	29,679	945,230	72.18%	1,309,568
City
Bandung	53,488	4.50%	64,055	5.39%	372,144	31.32%	698,334	58.78%	1,188,021	36,937	1,224,958	64.89%	1,887,881
Banjar	9,020	8.46%	6,658	6.25%	20,110	18.87%	70,782	66.42%	106,570	4,285	110,855	71.79%	154,425
Bekasi	68,262	6.93%	65,222	6.62%	367,372	37.28%	484,700	49.18%	985,556	35,003	1,020,559	55.81%	1,828,740
Bogor	35,888	7.20%	37,145	7.46%	147,155	29.54%	278,039	55.81%	498,227	26,469	524,696	64.36%	815,249
Cimahi	17,343	5.90%	15,330	5.21%	88,673	30.16%	172,700	58.73%	294,046	8,548	302,594	72.05%	419,974
Cirebon	13,698	8.66%	11,915	7.53%	41,101	25.98%	91,501	57.83%	158,215	12,223	170,438	66.63%	255,779
Depok	92,535	10.94%	72,123	8.53%	241,900	28.60%	439,110	51.92%	845,668	35,854	881,522	61.75%	1,427,674
Sukabumi	10,140	5.81%	12,619	7.22%	40,539	23.21%	111,361	63.76%	174,659	7,754	182,413	70.17%	259,961
Tasikmalaya	55,095	13.72%	18,511	4.61%	76,920	19.15%	251,125	62.52%	401,651	17,208	418,859	77.00%	543,990
Total	2,204,452	9.71%	2,116,017	9.32%	4,260,072	18.76%	14,130,192	62.22%	22,710,733	993,052	23,703,785	65.98%	35,925,960
Source: Official results
