= Governor of West Java =

Head of government of the Indonesian province of West Java

- Gubernur Jawa Barat
- Coat of arms of West Java

- Flag of West Java (non-civil)

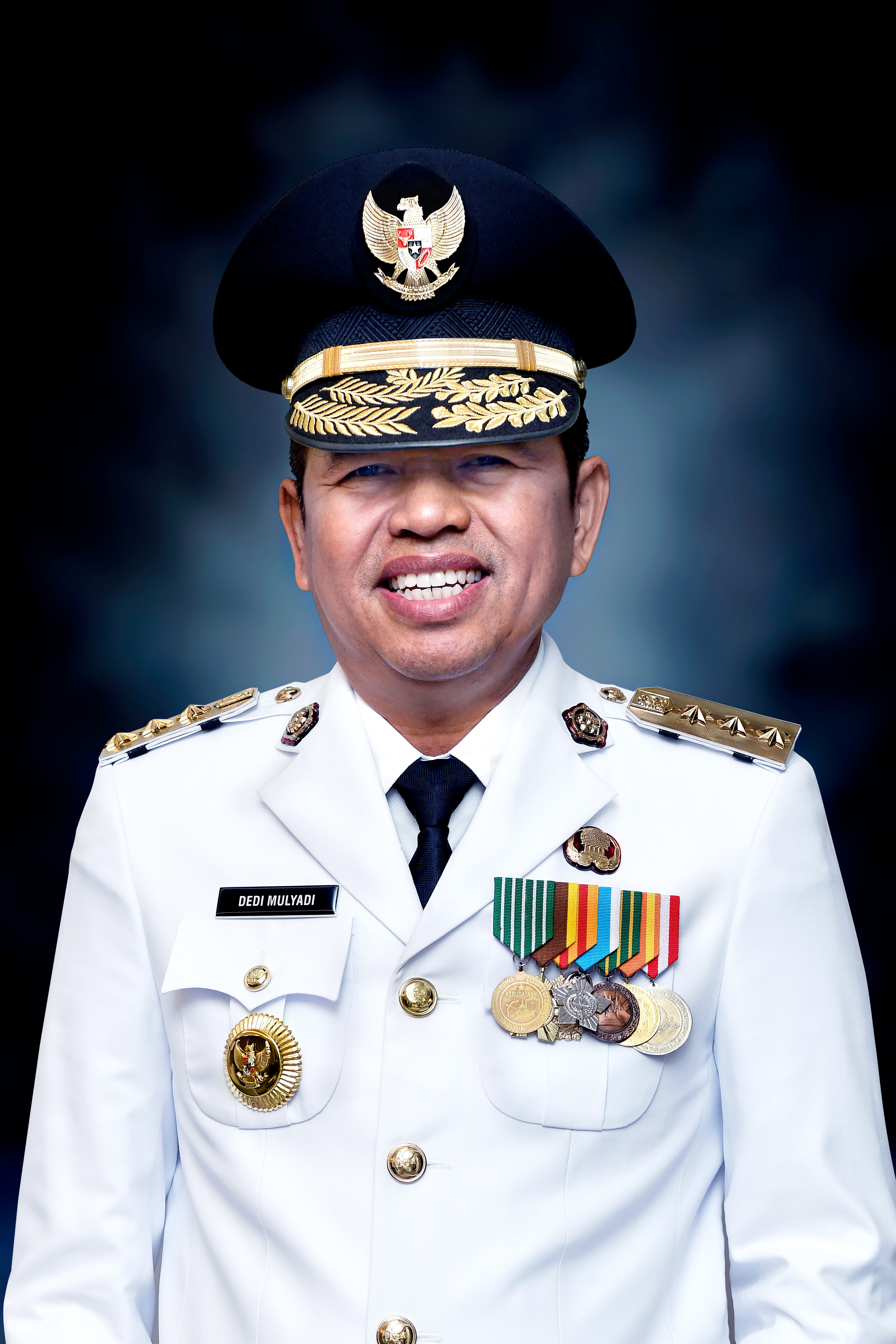
- Incumbent; Dedi Mulyadi since 20 February 2025
- West Java Provincial Government
- Style: Mr. Governor (informal); The Honorable (formal); His Excellency (diplomatic)
- Type: Chief executive
- Status: Head of government
- Abbreviation: GOWJ (in English); Gub. Jabar (in Indonesian)
- Residence: Pakuan Building, Jalan Pasir Kaliki, Bandung
- Seat: Bandung
- Nominator: Political parties or Independent
- Appointer: Direct popular elections within West Java (Note: since 2008, previously via West Java Regional House of Representatives) or President
- Term length: Five years, renewable once 1 years (specifically for the acting governor)
- Inaugural holder: Soetardjo Kartohadikusumo
- Formation: 19 August 1945; 81 years ago
- Deputy: Vice Governor of West Java
- Salary: Rp3 million (US$179,47) per month
- Website: jabarprov.go.id

The Governor of West Java (Indonesian: Gubernur Jawa Barat) is the executive head of the West Java Province. He is responsible for running the government together with his deputy and members of the West Java Regional House of Representatives (DPRD) as the legislature. The Governor of West Java is an elected politician who, along with the vice governor and 120 members of the West Java Regional House of Representatives (DPRD), is accountable for the strategic government of the province of West Java.

== History ==
Historically, the first governor of West Java was held by Sutardjo Kertohadikusumo who came from Central Java. In the midst of the revolution, Sutardjo was replaced by Mohammad Djamin. Dualism of leadership also occurred during the reign of Ipik Gandamana, where Oja Somantri was elected and appointed as Kepala Daerah Swatantra Tingkat I in early January 1958. At that time, Oja served as Chairman of the West Java Transitional Regional People's Representative Council.

== List ==
Although not consecutively, the governor of West Java was always appointed to the position of Minister of Home Affairs of Indonesia during the Old Order to New Order. The following is a definitive list of Governors of West Java since 1945.

=== List of governors ===
| No | Name | Image | Took office | Left office | Time in office | Vice Governor(s) | Elected | Ref. |
|---|---|---|---|---|---|---|---|---|
| 1 | Sutardjo Kertohadikusumo (1892–1976) | | 19 August 1945 | December 1945 | 3 months | Jusuf Adiwinata; 1945–1949 | | |
| 2 | Datuk Djamin (1903–1957) | | December 1945 | June 1946 | 6 months | Jusuf Adiwinata; 1945–1949 | | |
| 3 | Murdjani (1905–1956) | | June 1946 | 1 April 1947 | 1 years, 2 months | Jusuf Adiwinata; 1945–1949 | | |
| 4 | Sewaka (1895–1967) | | 1 April 1947 | 25 April 1951 | 4 years, 24 days | Ipik Gandamana; 1949–1952 | | |
| 4 | Sewaka (1895–1967) | | 25 April 1951 | 9 May 1951 | 138 days | Ipik Gandamana; 1949–1952 | | |
| 4 | Sewaka (relieved from his office) | | 9 May 1951 | 10 September 1951 | 124 days | Ipik Gandamana; 1949–1952 | | |
| 5 | Sanusi Hardjadinata (1914–1995) | | 1 July 1951 | 9 April 1957 | 5 years, 282 days | Ipik Gandamana; 1949–1952 | | |
| 6 | Ipik Gandamana (1906–1979) | | 1 July 1957 | 6 February 1960 | 5 years, 282 days | vacant | | |
| 7 | Mashudi (1921–2005) | | 6 February 1960 | 25 April 1967 | 7 years, 78 days | Astrawinata (1960–63); Dachjar Sudiwijaya (1963–67); Achmad Nashuhi (1967–73) | | |
| 7 | Mashudi (1921–2005) | | 25 April 1967 | 14 Februari 1970 | 2 years, 295 days | Astrawinata (1960–63); Dachjar Sudiwijaya (1963–67); Achmad Nashuhi (1967–73) | | |
| 8 | Solihin G. P. (1926–2024) | | 14 February 1970 | 14 February 1975 | 5 years, 0 days | Ahmad Nasuhi; 1967–1973 | 1970 | |
| 9 | Aang Kunaefi (1922–1999) | | 14 February 1975 | 19 May 1980 | 5 years, 95 days | Suhud Warnaen; 1978–1980 | 1975 | |
| 9 | Aang Kunaefi (1922–1999) | | 19 May 1980 | 22 May 1985 | 5 years, 3 days | Aboeng Koesman; Suhud Warnaen | 1980 | |
| 10 | Yogie Suardi Memet (1929–2007) | | 22 May 1985 | 22 May 1990 | 5 years, 0 days | Aboeng Koesman; Suhud Warnaen | 1985 | |
| 10 | Yogie Suardi Memet (1929–2007) | | 22 Mei 1990 | 22 Mei 1993 | 3 years, 0 days | Suryatna; Karna; Achmad Sampurna | 1990 | |
| 11 | Nana Nuriana (1938–2024) | | 22 May 1993 | 13 June 1998 | 5 years, 22 days | Ukman Sutaryan; Achmad Sampurna | 1993 | |
| 11 | Nana Nuriana (1938–2024) | | 13 Juni 1998 | 13 Juni 2003 | 5 years, 0 days | Husein Jachjasaputra; Dedem Ruchlia; Sudarna | 1998 | |
| 12 | Danny Setiawan (born 1945) | | 13 June 2003 | 13 June 2008 | 5 years, 0 days | Nu'man Abdul Hakim; 2003–2008 | 2003 | |
| 13 | Ahmad Heryawan (born 1966) | | 13 June 2008 | 13 June 2013 | 5 years, 0 days | Dede Yusuf; 2008–2013 | 2008 | |
| 13 | Ahmad Heryawan (born 1966) | | 13 June 2013 | 13 June 2018 | 5 years, 0 days | Deddy Mizwar; 2013–2018 | 2013 | |
| 14 | Ridwan Kamil (born 1971) | | 5 September 2018 | 5 September 2023 | 5 years, 0 days | Uu Ruzhanul Ulum; 2018–2023 | 2018 | |
| 15 | Dedi Mulyadi (born 1971) | | 20 February 2025 | Incumbent | 1 year, 199 days | Erwan Setiawan; 2024–present | 2024 | |

=== Acting governor ===
In a stack of governments, a regional head who submits for leave, temporarily resigns, and left office from his position to the central government, then the Minister of Home Affairs prepares his successor who is a bureaucrat in the local government or even a Vice Governor, including when the position of governor is in transition. The following is a list of temporary replacements for the post of Governor of the West Java.

| No | Image | Name | Took office | Left office | Governor(s) | Ref. |
|---|---|---|---|---|---|---|
| 1 | | Ukar Bratakusumah | 22 December 1948 | 1 September 1950 | Sewaka | |
| 2 | | Lex Laksamana | 27 March 2008 | 9 April 2008 | Danny Setiawan | |
| 3 | | Perry Suparman | 7 February 2013 | 20 February 2013 | Ahmad Heryawan | |
| 4 | | Deddy Mizwar | 16 March 2014 | 26 March 2014 | Ahmad Heryawan | |
| 4 | | Deddy Mizwar | 4 April 2014 | 24 April 2014 | Ahmad Heryawan | |
| 4 | | Deddy Mizwar | 13, 20, 25 June and 1 July 2014 | | Ahmad Heryawan | |
| 4 | | Deddy Mizwar | 15 September 2015 | 5 October 2015 | Ahmad Heryawan | |
| 5 | | Iwa Karniwa | 13 June 2018 | 15 June 2018 | Transition | |
| 6 | | Mochamad Iriawan | 15 June 2018 | 5 September 2018 | Transition | |
| 7 | | Uu Ruzhanul Ulum | 18 May 2022 | 28 May 2022 | Ridwan Kamil | (Note: Vice Governor Uu Ruzhanul Ulum appointed as acting governor during the incumbent governor Ridwan Kamil's working visit to United Kingdom. Ridwan applied for an extension of his leave after his eldest son went missing and was later found drowned in Switzerland.) |
| 7 | | Uu Ruzhanul Ulum | 29 May 2022 | 3 June 2022 | Ridwan Kamil | (Note: Vice Governor Uu Ruzhanul Ulum appointed as acting governor during the incumbent governor Ridwan Kamil's working visit to United Kingdom. Ridwan applied for an extension of his leave after his eldest son went missing and was later found drowned in Switzerland.) |
| 7 | | Uu Ruzhanul Ulum | 9 June 2022 | 19 June 2022 | Ridwan Kamil | (Note: Incumbent governor Ridwan Kamil again applied for leave to repatriate the body of his eldest child at Insel Hospital, Switzerland.) |
| 7 | | Uu Ruzhanul Ulum | 4 July 2022 | 18 July 2022 | Ridwan Kamil | |
| 8 | | Bey Machmudin | 5 September 2023 | 20 February 2025 | Transition | |

Notes

Legends

Independent
Parindra Party
PNI
IPKI Party
Masyumi Party
Military
Golkar
PKS
Democratic Party
PPP Party
Gerindra Party

=== Dutch and Japanese Occupation Period ===
| No. | Image | Name | Took office | Left office | Deputy | Ref. |
|---|---|---|---|---|---|---|
| 1 | | Col. Matsui | 29 April 1942 | 17 August 1945 | Pandu Surianingrat | |
