= Ahmad Syaikhu =

Indonesian politician (born 1965)

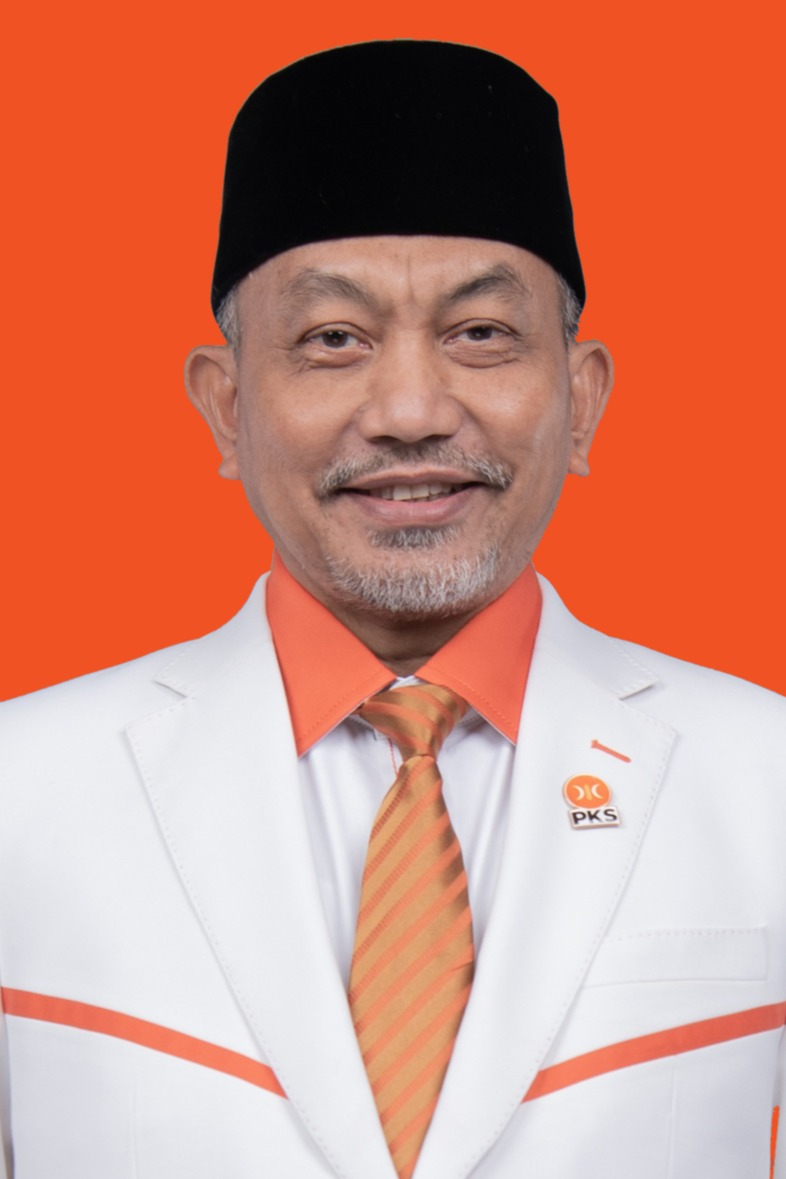

8th President of Prosperous Justice Party
- In office 5 October 2020 – 20 September 2024
- Preceded by: Sohibul Iman
- Succeeded by: Ahmad Heryawan (acting); Al Muzammil Yusuf

Member of the House of Representatives
- In office 1 October 2019 – 24 September 2024
- Constituency: West Java VII

3rd Vice Mayor of Bekasi
- In office 10 March 2013 – 10 March 2018
- Mayor: Rahmat Effendi
- Preceded by: Rahmat Effendi
- Succeeded by: Tri Ardhianto

Regional House of Representatives roles
- 2004–2009: Member of the Bekasi City House of Representatives
- 2009–2013: Member of the West Java Regional House of Representatives

Personal details
- Born: 23 January 1965 (age 61) Cirebon Regency, Indonesia
- Party: PKS
- Spouse: Lilik Wakhidah
- Children: 6
- Education: Indonesian State College of Accountancy

Ahmad Syaikhu (born 23 January 1965) is an Indonesian politician who was President of the Prosperous Justice Party between 2020 and 2024. He served as the vice mayor of Bekasi between 2013 and 2018 as the deputy of Rahmat Effendi.

Born in Cirebon Regency, he studied accounting and worked as a government auditor before being elected into Bekasi's city council and later the West Java Provincial Council. He ran as Mayor of Bekasi and Vice Governor of West Java in 2008 and 2018, respectively, but both bids failed. In 2024, he ran in the gubernatorial election of West Java, losing to Dedi Mulyadi.

== Early life and education ==
Syaikhu was born in Ciledugkulon village, Ciledug, Cirebon Regency on 23 January 1965. His father was a civil servant. Syaikhu completed his basic education there, moving to a separate school once during elementary due to his father's reassignment, before proceeding to study accounting at the State College of Finance.

=== Anthroponymy ===
Ahmad Syaikhu (Arabic: أحمد شيخوه, 'Ahmad Shaykhuh) is an Arabic-based name approximately meaning "my praiseworthy leader".

== Political career ==
He began his career in 1986 as a government auditor in South Sumatra. After three years there, he moved to become an auditor for the central government.

=== Bekasi City House of Representatives ===
In the 2004 legislative election, Syaikhu won a seat in Bekasi's city council for the 2004–2009 term. Midway, he ran in the 2008 Bekasi mayoral election, but lost to Mochtar Mohammad and his running mate Rahmat Effendi. He then won a seat in the West Java Provincial Council following the 2009 legislative election.

=== 2013 Bekasi mayoral election ===
He once more participated in the 2013 mayoral election as the running mate to Rahmat, with the pair winning with 43 percent of votes in the five-candidate race. They were sworn in on 13 March 2013. In 2015, he was elected as the chairman for the Prosperous Justice Party's West Java branch.

=== 2018 West Java gubernatorial election ===
Syaikhu ran as the running mate to Sudrajat in the 2018 gubernatorial election for West Java. Although they initially placed low in opinion polls (around 4 percent), the pair exceeded expectations and placed second behind Ridwan Kamil/Uu Ruzhanul Ulum, winning 28.74 percent.

=== House of Representatives ===
Following the end of his tenure in Bekasi, he registered to run under PKS as a candidate for the People's Representative Council, and was elected into the legislature. Later, he was brought forward as a candidate to replace Sandiaga Uno as the Vice Governor of Jakarta.

=== President of the Prosperous Justice Party ===
He was later elected president of the Prosperous Justice Party for the 2020–2025 tenure.

== Personal life ==
He is married to Lilik Wakhidah and the couple has six children.

Syaikhu founded several organizations focusing on Islamic education. In addition, he is an avid shooter, having served as chairman of Bekasi's shooting and hunting association.
