= Anne Ratna Mustika =

Indonesian politician (born 1982)

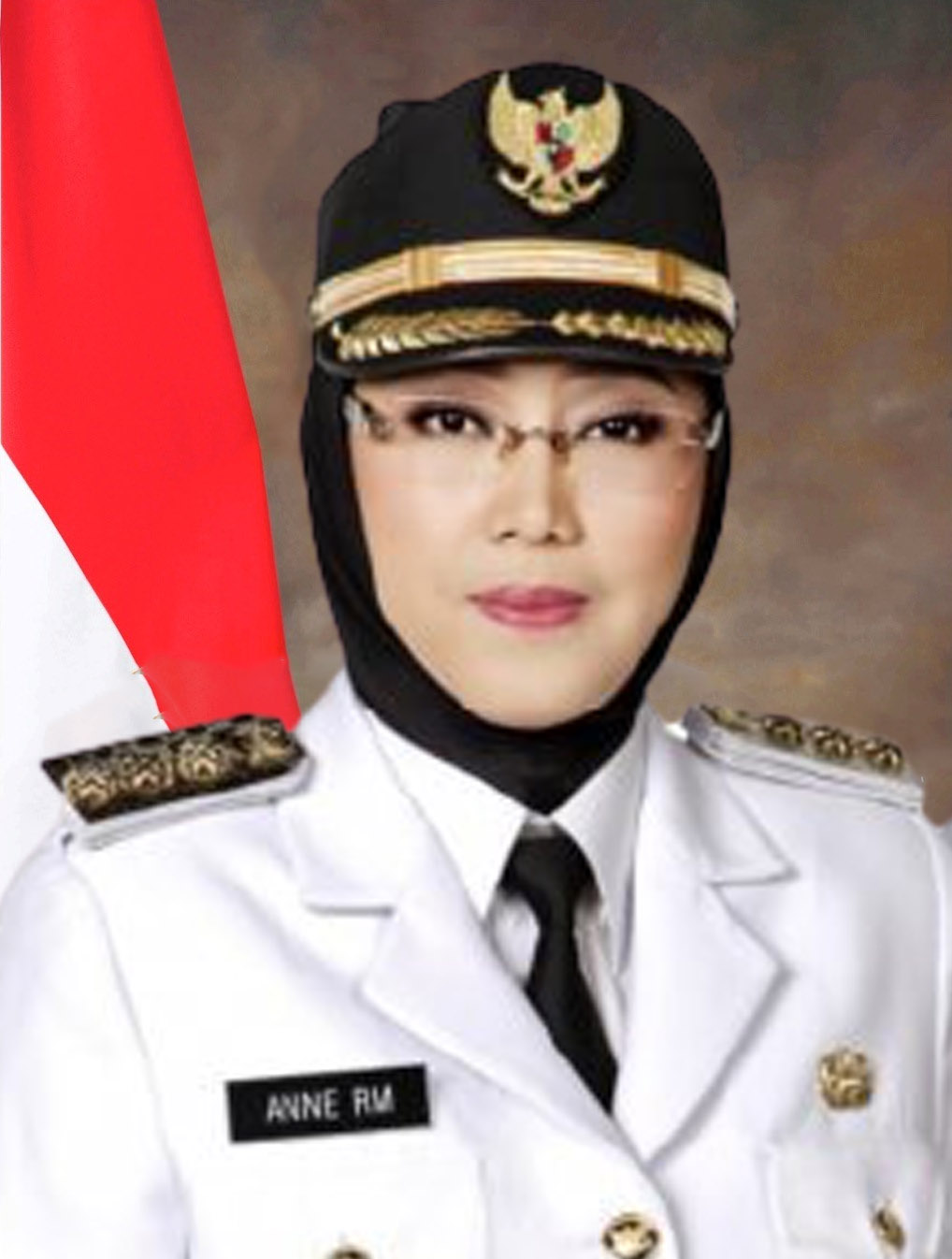

Regent of Purwakarta
- In office 20 September 2018 – 20 September 2023
- Governor: Ridwan Kamil
- Preceded by: Dedi Mulyadi
- Succeeded by: Saepul Bahri Binzein

Personal details
- Born: 28 January 1982 (age 44) Cikalong kulon, Indonesia
- Spouse(s): Dedi Mulyadi (m. 2003; div. 2023) Iskandar (m. 2023)
- Children: 3

Anne Ratna Mustika (born 28 January 1982) is an Indonesian politician who is the regent of Purwakarta from 2018 to 2023, succeeding her husband Dedi Mulyadi when his second term of office expired. She was the first female leader of the regency.

== Background ==
Mustika was born in Gudang village, Cikalong Kulon, Cianjur Regency on 28 January 1982. Her father Usep Supriadi was a village chief and her mother Dedeh Sumiati was active in feminist movements. She completed her elementary, middle and high school in Cianjur, graduating high school in 2000 before later studying for a bachelor's degree in a Purwakarta economic institute, graduating in 2016.

At the age of 17, Mustika participated in a beauty contest, being awarded the title of "Mojang Purwakarta" in 1999.

== Family ==
Mustika married Dedi Mulyadi, her immediate predecessor as regent, while Dedi was a member of Purwakarta's legislative body. The couple married in 2003 and has two children, with a third in pregnancy as of September 2018. She is also the niece of Bunyamin Dudih, regent of Purwakarta between 1993 and 2003. Mustika later filed for divorce in September 2022. She revealed the reason for divorce a month later, stating that Dedi had violated sharia and her rights as a wife.

== Career ==
As first lady of the regency, she was active in various household organizations, including the PKK (Pendidikan Kesejahteraan Keluarga, lit. Family Welfare Education) and household handicrafts. She also participated in socializing programs, especially family planning. In 2016, she founded a gallery to facilitate handcrafts made by Purwakarta women.

In 2018, Mustika participated in the regency's election with her husband facing term limits. Running with the support of Golkar, Demokrat, Hanura, PKB, Nasdem and PAN, she won the election, gaining 218,429 votes (44.01%) in the three-candidate race.

She was sworn in by governor Ridwan Kamil on 20 September 2018. Mustika was around seven weeks pregnant during the ceremony. Mustika became the first female to lead Purwakarta Regency. She will be running as a legislative candidate for the West Java Regional People's Representative Council under Golkar in the 2024 Indonesian legislative election.
