= Netty Prasetiyani =

Indonesian activist and politician

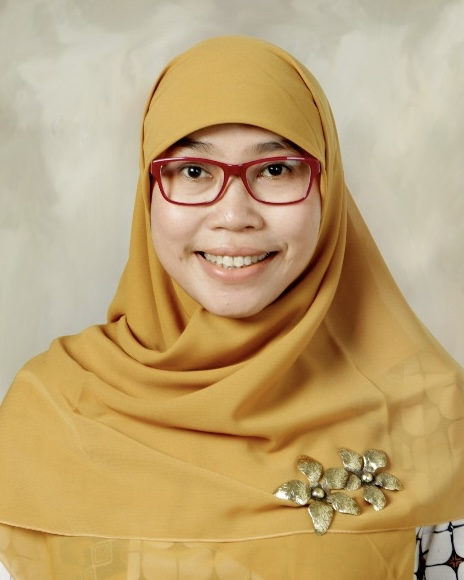
- Official portrait

Member of People's Representative Council
- Incumbent
- Assumed office 1 October 2019
- Constituency: West Java VIII

Personal details
- Born: Netty Prasetiyani; 15 October 1969 (age 56) Jakarta, Indonesia
- Party: Prosperous Justice Party
- Spouse: Ahmad Heryawan (m. 1991)
- Education: University of Indonesia; Padjadjaran University
- Occupation: Activist and politician

Netty Prasetiyani Heryawan (/nɛti/; born 15 October 1969) is an Indonesian activist and politician who has been a member of the House of Representatives (DPR) since 2019.

== Education ==
Prasetiyani took a women's studies major at the University of Indonesia. She enjoyed activism ever since she started working at SMAN 14 Jakarta in 1985. She has constantly followed activist groups, particularly in the social and women's spheres, from high school. She also completed a course in government science from the Padjadjaran University.

== Career ==
=== Activism ===
Prasetiyani is regarded as concerned about women and children in West Java. She was the head of the Integrated Service Center for Women and Children Empowerment (P2TP2A) in that region. She focused on assisting victims of human trafficking through the P2TP2A program. She personally picked up ten West Javan victims of human trafficking in Batam.

Prasetiyani said that if her husband was charged with corruption, she would have a coffin made for him. She took that action because she had consistently encouraged her husband to fight corruption. Prasetiyani backed the Sudrajat-Syaikhu pair in the 2018 West Java governor's race, saying he was the ideal mate to carry on Kang Aher's leadership.

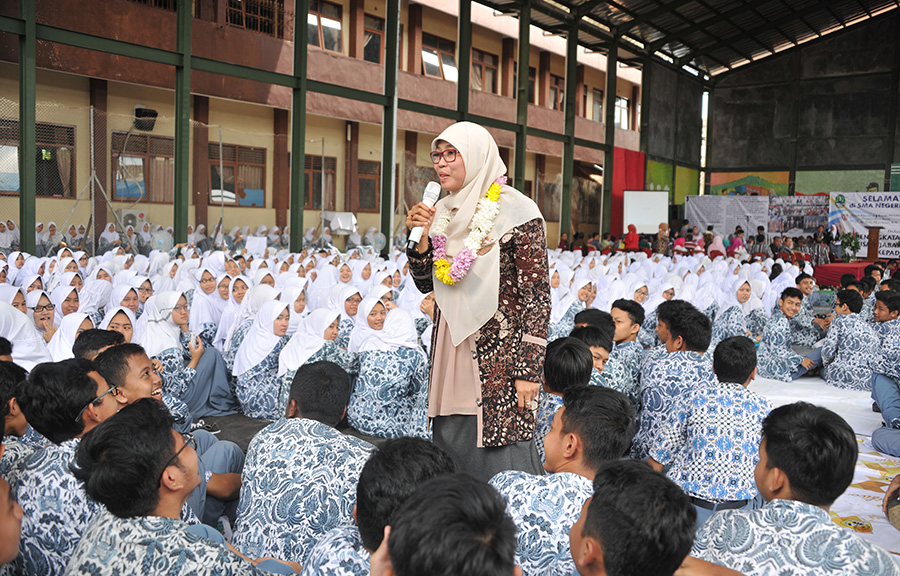
Netty giving a speech during her visit to SMAN 1 Kota Tasikmalaya in 2017

On 9 September 2017, in order to reject violence against children in West Javan schools, Prasetiyani supported the School Literacy Movement (GLS) and West Java Socialisation. During her visit to SMAN 1 Kota Tasikmalaya, she stated that Elizabeth Pisani's description of the situation was based on the outcomes of the PIAAC test, which measures an individual's problem-solving skills in large cities. Prasetiyani said that people losing interest in reading is a warning sign that civilisation is in risk of collapsing.

=== Political career ===
In the 2019 Legislative Election (Pileg), Prasetiyani was a candidate for the Indonesian House of Representatives. She believed that the Prosperous Justice Party would win the 2019 Legislative Election. She said that she and her husband, who served as West Java's governor for these two terms, shared a commitment to balance. She stated that a husband and wife should put their family's resiliency first and should not both pursue a political career. On 1 October, it was announced that she was among the appointees for the House of Representatives. She was reelected for a second term in the 2024 election with 67,263 votes.

Prasetiyani requested that the government delay vaccinating Indonesians against COVID-19. She stated that before the COVID-19 vaccination was administered to the general population, Indonesian Food and Drug Authority and Indonesian Ulema Council must ensure its safety and halalness. She stated that her party wants to make sure that all vaccines, whether they are made locally, imported, or developed in conjunction with other nations, fulfill three key criteria. She also urged people to put off getting pregnant while the COVID-19 outbreak was going on. The rationale was that, in a pandemic like this one, birthrates and pregnancies need to be under control.

Prasetiyani was reportedly one of the most formidable contenders to be supported by her party in the 2024 West Java gubernatorial election. Aher has been vocal in favor of letting her run for governor, even though it hadn't been formally decided. She was first questioned by the media team about her preparedness to advance as the Candidate for Governor of West Java if it was carried by her party. In response, she stated that her party was still concentrating on getting ready for the 2024 legislative and presidential elections.

According to Prasetiyani, the family plays a critical role in ensuring that children grow to their full size and avoid stunting. She stated this in 2023, at the PGRI Banjaran Building in Bandung Regency, during the Promotion of the KIE Program to Accelerate the Reduction of Stunting in Special Areas. She insisted that the prevention of stunting needed to begin upstream and that it was crucial for the community and particularly the family. The high prevalence of stunting would not lead to a population catastrophe in Indonesia. According to her, as stated in the release obtained by Tahu Ekspres, "This effort is important so that Indonesia is free from civilization disasters triggered by high stunting rates."

== Personal life ==
Prasetiyani was born on 15 October 1969, in Jakarta. She married Ahmad Heryawan, the Governor of West Java from 2008 to 2018, in January 1991, and together they have six children. She is a Prosperous Justice Party (PKS) cadre, just like her spouse.

== Awards ==
The National Library of the Republic of Indonesia awarded Prasetiyani the 2011 Nugra Jasa Darma Pustaloka award in recognition of her efforts to foster a love of reading in West Java. It has been acknowledged as the Mother of West Java Literacy since 2 September 2016, according to Bapusipda West Java. She was recognized by the US Embassy in Indonesia in January 2013 as a Local Hero who opposes human trafficking, according to votes cast on the embassy's Facebook fan page.
