= Dani Anwar =

Indonesian politician (1968–2020)

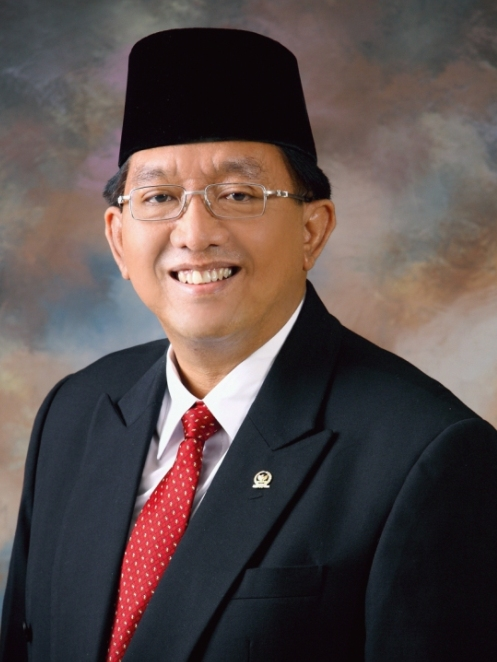
- Anwar in 2010

Member of the Jakarta Regional House of Representatives
- In office 1 October 2019 – 3 August 2020

Member of Regional Representative Council
- In office 1 October 2009 – 1 October 2014

First Deputy Speaker of the Jakarta Regional House of Representatives
- In office June 19, 2008 – August 25, 2009 Serving with 3 other people
- Speaker: Ade Surapriatna
- Preceded by: Ahmad Heryawan
- Succeeded by: Triwisaksana

Personal details
- Born: 22 February 1968; Jakarta, Indonesia
- Died: 3 August 2020 (aged 52); Jakarta, Indonesia
- Political party: PKS

Dani Anwar (22 February 1968 – 3 August 2020) was an Indonesian politician who served as a Senator. He died from COVID-19 during the COVID-19 pandemic in Indonesia.
