= Akhmad Zurfaih =

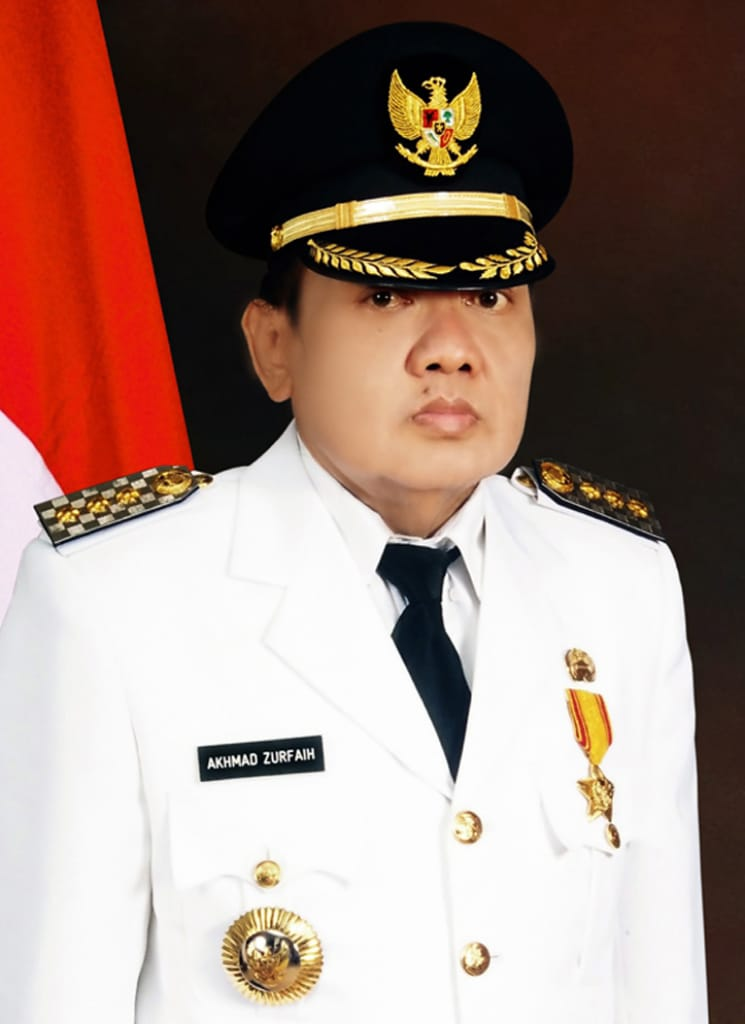

Mayor of Bekasi
- In office 2003–2008
- Preceded by: Nonon Sonthanie
- Succeeded by: Mochtar Mohamad

Member of Bekasi City DPRD
- In office 1997–2003

Personal details
- Born: 1 August 1952; Bekasi, West Java, Indonesia
- Died: c. 1 June 2011 (aged 58)
- Political party: Golkar

Akhmad Zurfaih (1 August 1952 – 2011) was an Indonesian politician of the Golkar party who served as the mayor of Bekasi between 2003 and 2008. Prior to being mayor, he was a member of the city's legislature.

== Early life and career ==
Akhmad Zurfaih was born in Bekasi on 1 August 1952. Prior to entering politics, he was an employee at a branch of Bank Rakyat Indonesia in Bekasi.

== Politics ==
He joined Golkar, and was elected as a member of Bekasi's DPRD in 1997 and 1999. In 2003, he was elected as mayor of Bekasi with fellow legislator Mochtar Mohamad as his deputy. During his tenure as mayor, Zurfaih oversaw large-scale renovations of Bekasi's Al-Barkah Mosque.

Zurfaih was also involved in a dispute with the provincial government of Jakarta over trash management, namely a landfill in Bantargebang (in Bekasi) where a large number of Jakarta's waste were delivered. Prior to Zurfaih's term, the landfill's management was given to the Jakarta government, but Zurfaih opted for Bekasi to take over the management when the arrangement expired in December 2003. He also demanded compensation from Jakarta to residents of neighborhoods surrounding the landfill. The landfill was briefly closed due to the dispute in January 2004. Further disputes continued following another agreement expiry in 2006.

At the end of his tenure, Zurfaih did not take part in the 2008 mayoral election, which was won by his deputy Mochtar Mohamad.

== Death ==
He died in 2011, and was buried on 1 June 2011 at the backyard of a mosque in Bekasi. At the time of his death, he was chairman of Bekasi City's national sports committee branch (having served since 2003), and had four children with his wife. A street in Bekasi was named after him in 2023.

One of his daughters, Siti Aisyah, served in Bekasi City's DPRD in 2004–2009 and in West Java DPRD in 2014–2019 before being arrested by the Corruption Eradication Commission in 2021.
