= Tri Adhianto Tjahyono =

Indonesian politician

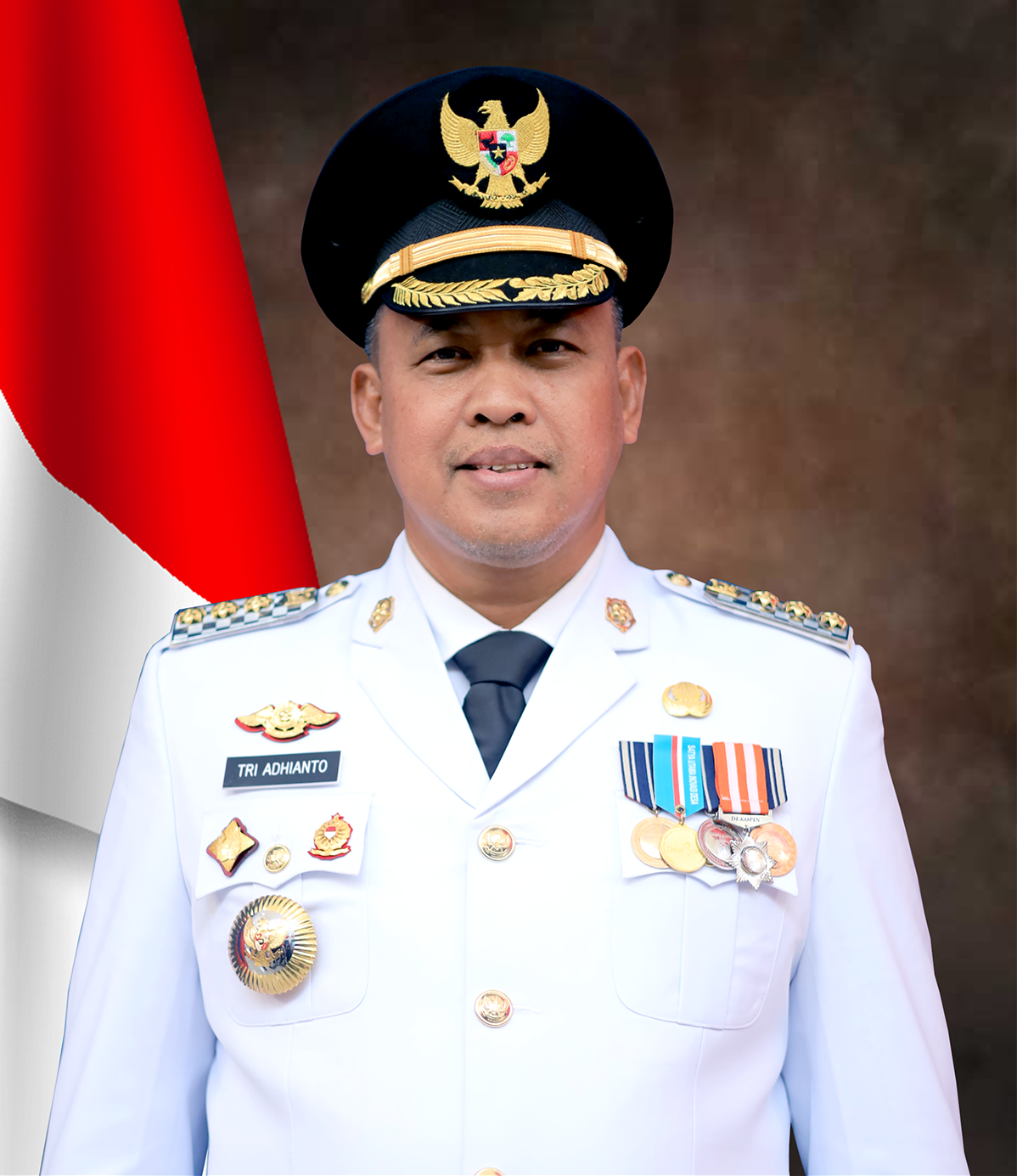

Mayor of Bekasi
- Incumbent
- Assumed office 20 February 2025
- Preceded by: R. Gani Muhammad (act.)
- In office 21 August 2023 – 20 September 2023; Acting from 7 January 2022
- Preceded by: Rahmat Effendi
- Succeeded by: R. Gani Muhammad (act.)

Vice Mayor of Bekasi
- In office 20 September 2018 – 7 January 2022
- Mayor: Rahmat Effendi
- Preceded by: Ahmad Syaikhu
- Succeeded by: Abdul Harris Bobihoe

Personal details
- Born: 3 January 1970 (age 56) Jakarta, Indonesia
- Party: PDI-P (since 2019)
- Other political affiliations: PAN (2017–2019)
- Education: Lampung University
- Occupation: Politician; civil servant; bureaucrat

Tri Adhianto Tjahyono (born 3 January 1970) is an Indonesian politician of the Indonesian Democratic Party of Struggle who is the mayor of Bekasi, serving since February 2025. He had previously been elected as deputy mayor in 2018, and later served as acting mayor (briefly full mayor) between 2022 and 2023.

== Early life and career ==
Tri Adhianto Tjahyono was born in Jakarta on 3 January 1970 as the third child of G Soeprapto and Endang Sri Guntur Hudiani. He studied in Jakarta, graduating high school in 1989. He then worked as a government employee within the Ministry of Transportation before moving to Bandar Lampung's municipal government. During his time there, he earned bachelors' and masters' degrees from Lampung University. He then relocated to Bekasi, where he rose up the ranks of the municipal government. By 2017, he was head of the city's public works department.

== Political career ==
In Bekasi's 2018 mayoral election, Tri became the running mate of incumbent mayor Rahmat Effendi, and the pair was elected with around 68 percent of votes. They were sworn in on 20 September 2018. In 2019, Tri was elected as chairman of PDI-P in Bekasi. Prior to joining PDI-P that year, he had been a member of the National Mandate Party (PAN) for less than two years, and prior to that, he had also been a member of Golkar and Democratic Party.

On 6 January 2022, Effendi was arrested by the Corruption Eradication Commission, and the following day Tri was appointed as acting mayor. He was appointed as full mayor on 22 August 2023, after Effendi's trial concluded. Less than one month later, his term as mayor ended on 20 September 2023, and he was replaced by Raden Gani Muhammad as acting mayor.

Tri ran for a full term in the 2024 Bekasi mayoral election, with West Java provincial legislator Abdul Harris Bobihoe as running mate. The pair won the election with 459,430 votes (47.06%) in the three-way race.
