= Coat of arms of West Java =

- Adopted: 1961
- Shield: Green, White cleaver with Red head, surrounded by 17 grains of rice and 8 cotton flowers in natural colors, appears on the Black mountain range. Below the dam image, on the left are 3 blue waves and 2 white waves (total 5), and on the right are blue and white squares.
- Motto: Gemah, Ripah, Répéh, Rapih in black letters on a yellow ribbon.

The Coat of arms of West Java is a shield with a consists of an oval-shaped shield with a ribbon decoration at the bottom containing the motto written in Sundanese: Gemah, Ripah, Répéh, Rapih.

== Meaning ==
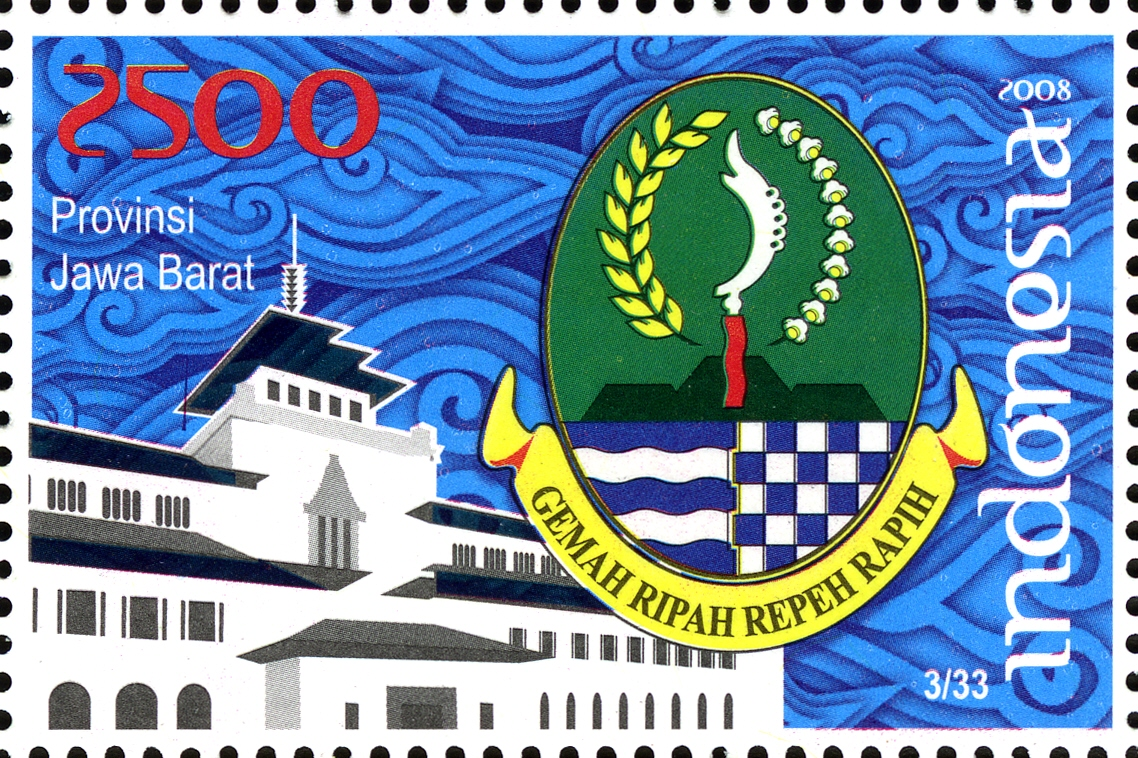
Stamp of Indonesia in 2008, showing the coat of arms of West Java

1. The oval shape of the West Java emblem originates from a shield used for self-defense.
2. In the center is a kujang (sword). This kujang is the weapon of the Sundanese people, the indigenous people of West Java. The five holes in the kujang represent the foundation of the Indonesian state, Pancasila.
3. The single stalk of rice on the left represents the staple food of the West Javanese people and also symbolizes food fertility, and the number 17 represents the date of the Proclamation of the Republic of Indonesia.
4. The single stalk of cotton on the right represents the fertility of clothing, and the 8 flowers represent the month of the Proclamation of the Republic of Indonesia.
5. The mountain beneath the rice and cotton symbolizes the mountainous nature of West Java, particularly in the southern region.
6. The river and canal beneath the mountain on the left represent West Java's numerous rivers and waterways, which are vital for agriculture.
7. The plots beneath the mountain on the right represent the abundance of rice fields and plantations. The people of West Java generally rely on the fertility of their soil, which is cultivated for agriculture.
8. The dam in the center of the bottom section between the river and the plot represents irrigation activities, a key concern given that West Java is an agricultural region. It also represents dams in West Java, such as the Jatiluhur Dam.

== See also ==
- Armorial of Indonesia
