= 2024 Bekasi mayoral election =

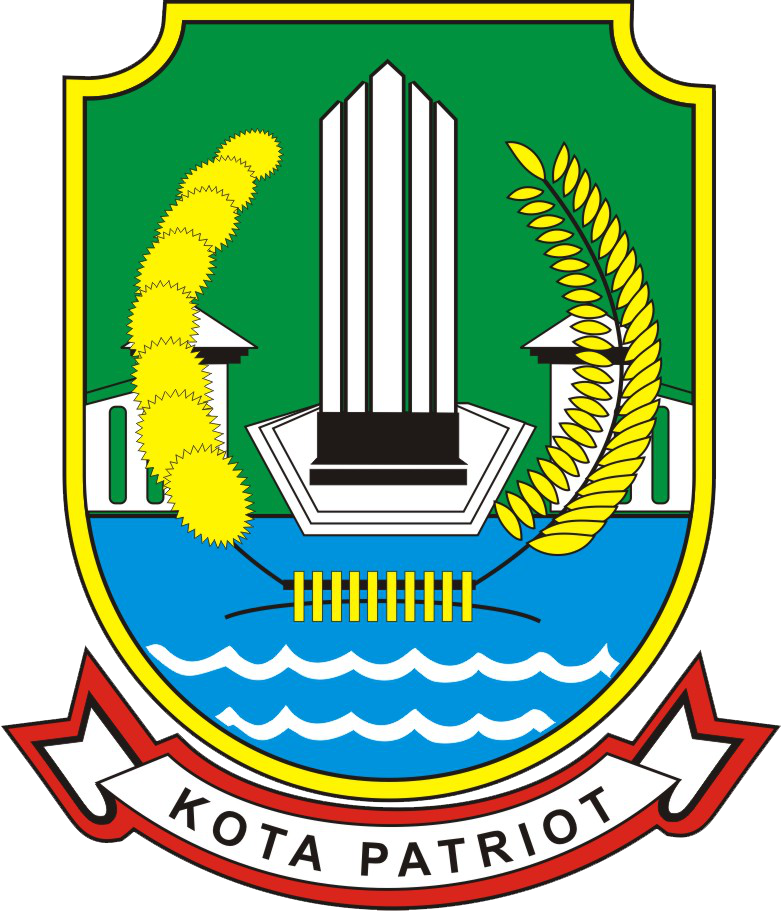
- 27 November 2024
- Turnout: 55.78%
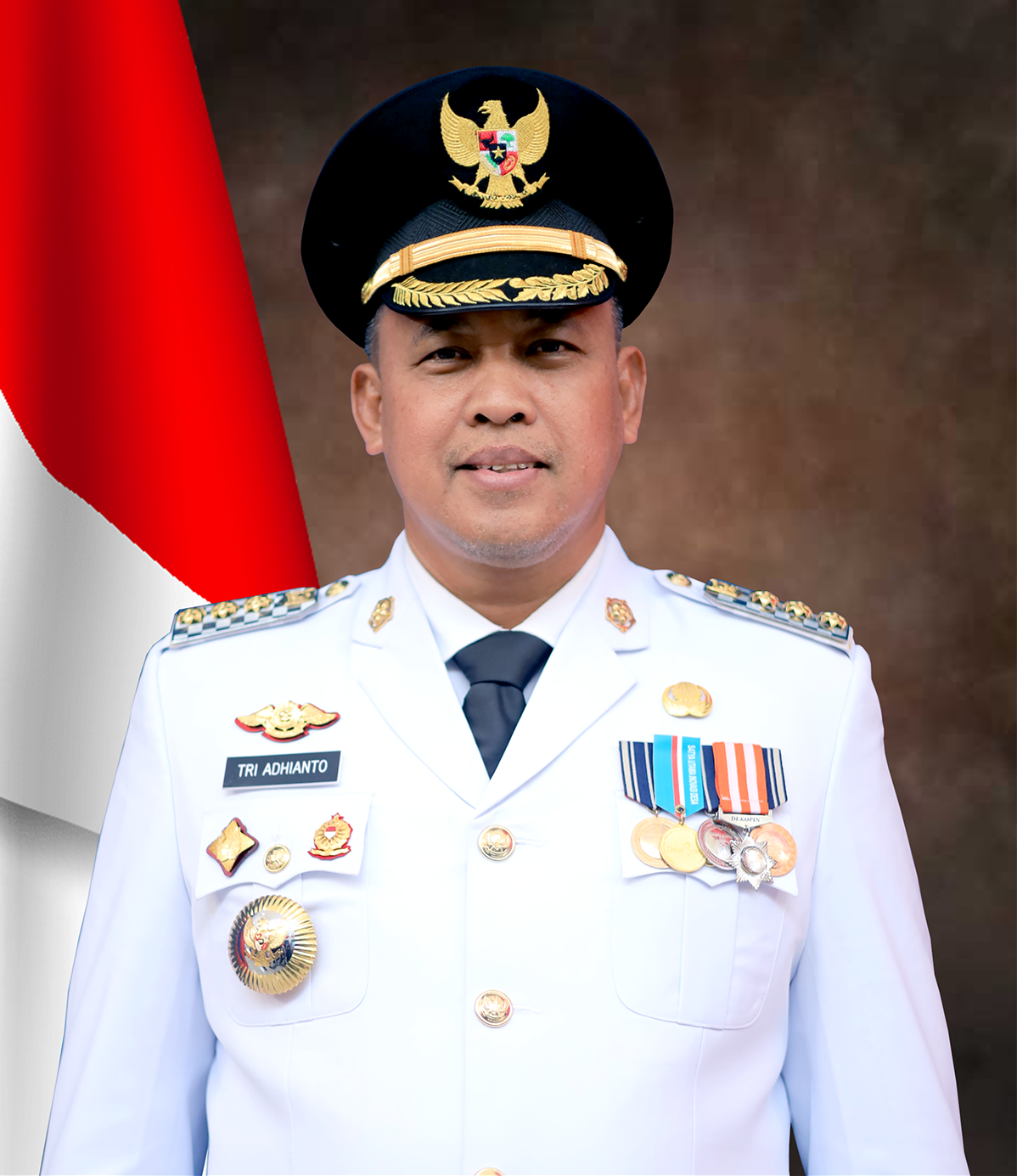

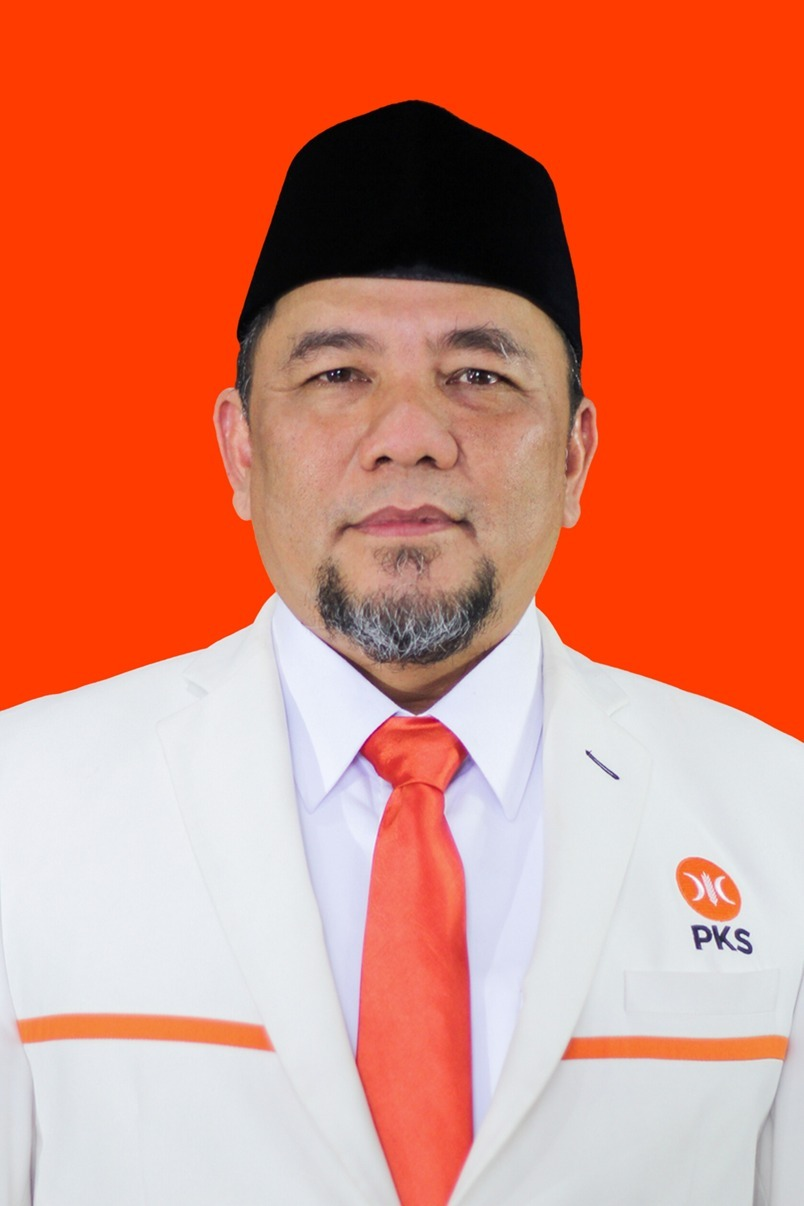

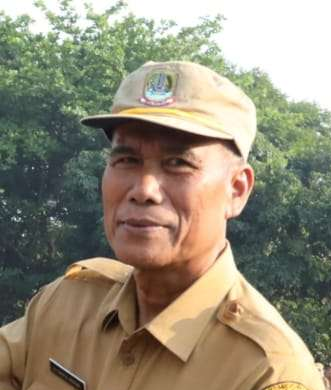
| Candidate | Tri Adhianto Tjahyono | Heri Koswara | Uu Saeful Mikdar |
| Party | PDI-P | PKS | Golkar |
| Running mate | Abdul Harris Bobihoe | Sholihin | Nurul Sumarheni |
| Popular vote | 459,430 | 452,351 | 64,509 |
| Percentage | 47.06% | 46.33% | 6.61% |
- Results by district and subdistrict (Interactive version)
Mayor before election
Raden Gani Muhammad (acting)
Independent
Elected mayor
Tri Adhianto Tjahyono
PDI-P

The 2024 Bekasi mayoral election was held on 27 November 2024 as part of nationwide local elections to elect the mayor and vice mayor of Bekasi for a five-year term. The election was won by Tri Adhianto Tjahyono of the Indonesian Democratic Party of Struggle (PDI-P) with 47% of the vote. Former member of the West Java Regional House of Representatives, Heri Koswara of the Prosperous Justice Party (PKS), placed second with 46%. Uu Saeful Mikdar of Golkar placed third, receiving 6%.

== Electoral system ==
The election, like other local elections in 2024, follow the first-past-the-post system where the candidate with the most votes wins the election, even if they do not win a majority. It is possible for a candidate to run uncontested, in which case the candidate is still required to win a majority of votes "against" an "empty box" option. Should the candidate fail to do so, the election will be repeated on a later date.

== Candidates ==
According to electoral regulations, in order to qualify for the election, candidates were required to secure support from a political party or a coalition of parties controlling 10 seats in the Bekasi City Regional House of Representatives (DPRD). The Prosperous Justice Party, with 11 DPRD seats, is the only party eligible to nominate a mayoral candidate without forming a coalition. Candidates may alternatively demonstrate support in form of photocopies of identity cards, which in Bekasi's case corresponds to 117,623 copies. An independent ticket registered with the General Elections Commission (KPU), but failed to submit the necessary proofs of support within the provided time.

The previously elected two-term mayor of Bekasi, Rahmat Effendi, was arrested for corruption and removed from his post in 2022.

Candidate from PKS and PPP
| Heri Koswara | Sholihin |
| for Mayor | for Vice Mayor |
| Member of West Java DPRD (2019–2024) | Member of Bekasi City DPRD (2019–2024) |
Parties
13 / 50 (26%) PKS (11 seats); PPP (2 seats)

Candidate from PDI-P
| Tri Adhianto Tjahyono | Abdul Harris Bobihoe |
| for Mayor | for Vice Mayor |
| Acting Mayor of Bekasi (2022–2023) | |
Parties
9 / 50 (18%) PDI-P (9 seats)

== Political map ==
Following the 2024 Indonesian general election, nine political parties are represented in the Bekasi Regional House of Representatives:

| Political parties | Seat count |
|---|---|
| Prosperous Justice Party (PKS) | 11 / 50 |
| Indonesian Democratic Party of Struggle (PDI-P) | 9 / 50 |
| Party of Functional Groups (Golkar) | 8 / 50 |
| Great Indonesia Movement Party (Gerindra) | 6 / 50 |
| National Mandate Party (PAN) | 5 / 50 |
| National Awakening Party (PKB) | 5 / 50 |
| Indonesian Solidarity Party (PSI) | 2 / 50 |
| United Development Party (PPP) | 2 / 50 |
| Democratic Party (Demokrat) | 2 / 50 |

== Results ==
| Candidate | Running mate | Party | Votes | % |
|---|---|---|---|---|
| Tri Adhianto Tjahyono | Abdul Harris Bobihoe | Indonesian Democratic Party of Struggle | 459,430 | 47.06 |
| Heri Koswara | Sholihin | Prosperous Justice Party | 452,351 | 46.33 |
| Uu Saeful Mikdar | Nurul Sumarheni | Golkar | 64,509 | 6.61 |
| Total | | | 976,290 | 100.00 |
| Valid votes | | | 976,290 | 95.71 |
| Invalid/blank votes | | | 43,794 | 4.29 |
| Total votes | | | 1,020,084 | 100.00 |
| Registered voters/turnout | | | 1,828,740 | 55.78 |
Source: KPU
