= Siliwangi University =

Public university in Tasikmalaya, Indonesia

Universitas Siliwangi
- Former name: Akademi Ahli Administrasi dan Supervisi Pendidikan (ADSUP) Siliwangi
- Motto: Tri Gatra Citra
- Type: National university
- Established: 1980 (As PTS); 2014 (As PTN)
- Parent institution: Ministry of Higher Education, Science, and Technology
- Rector: Prof. Dr. Ir. H. Nundang Busaeri, S. T., MT., IPU., ASEAN.Eng.
- Location: Tasikmalaya, West Java, Indonesia
- Campus: Urban: Tawang
- Colors: Yellow
- Nickname: UNSIL
- Website: www.unsil.ac.id

Siliwangi University (Indonesian: Universitas Siliwangi, abbreviated as UNSIL) is a public university in Tasikmalaya, West Java. The name of the university is derived from a royal figure in Sunda Kingdom, King Siliwangi of Pajajaran.

== History ==
Before UNSIL was founded, the Educational Supervision and Administration Academy (Indonesian: Akademi Administrasi dan Supervisi Pendidikan, abbreviated as ADSUP) was established in its place in 1977. It was originally a branch of Padjajaran University’s Faculty of Social and Political Sciences that went defunct due to a government regulation at the time. By 1978, ADSUP underwent a restructuring and became UNSIL. UNSIL officially started operating as a private university in 1980 and offered courses that now become a part of the Faculty of Teaching and Education Science as well as the Faculty of Economics. In 2014, due to a presidential decree signed by Susilo Bambang Yudhoyono, UNSIL became a public university.

== Academics ==
=== Faculties ===
UNSIL consists of seven faculties and 23 undergraduate programs, as well as three postgraduate programs.

==== Faculty of Teaching and Education Science ====
- Mathematics Education
- History Education
- Economics Education
- Biology Education
- Geography Education
- English Education
- Indonesian Language and Literature Education
- Physics Education
- Sports Education
- Informal Education

==== Faculty of Economics ====
- Accounting
- Management
- Development Economics
- Finance and Banking (available as an associate’s degree)

==== Faculty of Engineering ====
- Electrical Engineering
- Informatics Engineering
- Civil Engineering

==== Faculty of Agriculture ====
- Agrobusiness
- Agrotechnology

==== Faculty of Islamic Religion ====
- Sharia Economics

==== Faculty of Health ====
- Public Health
- Nutrition

==== Faculty of Social and Political Science ====
- Political Science

==== Faculty of Postgraduate Studies ====
- Agrobusiness
- Management
- Demographics and Environment Education

=== Ranking ===
According to Webometrics’ 2021 report, Siliwangi University is ranked 299th from all universities in Indonesia.

According to uniRank 2021 report, Siliwangi University is ranked 19th from 56th Universities in West Java, Ranked 130th from 576 Universities in Indonesia.
