= Dedi Mulyadi =

Indonesian politician (born 1971)

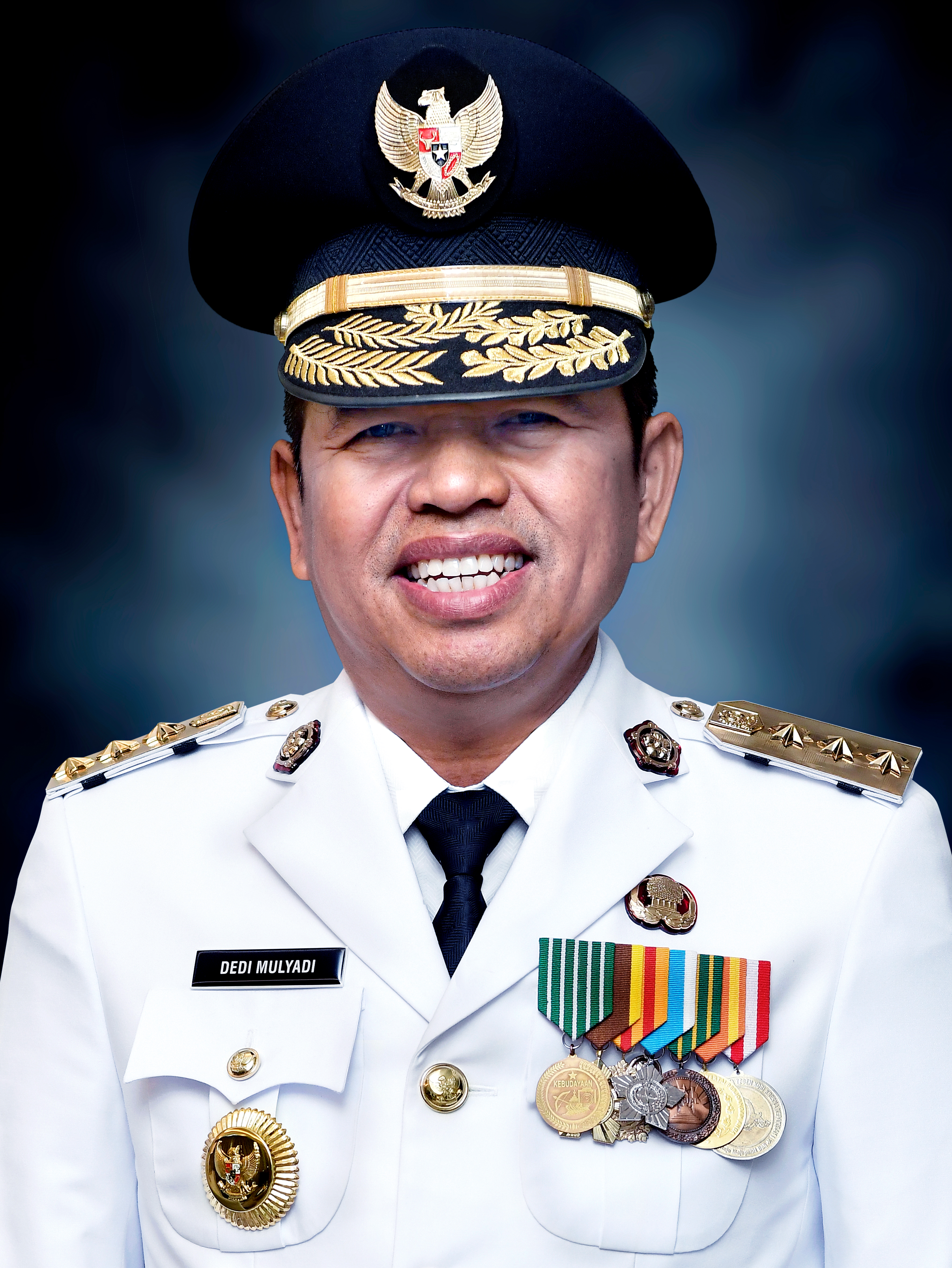
- Official portrait, 2025

15th Governor of West Java
- Incumbent
- Assumed office 20 February 2025
- Vice Governor: Erwan Setiawan
- Preceded by: Ridwan Kamil; Bey Machmudin (acting)

Member of the House of Representatives
- In office 1 October 2019 – 10 May 2023
- Preceded by: Multi-member district
- Succeeded by: Dadang S. Muchtar
- Constituency: West Java VII
- Majority: 206.622 (2019)

8th Regent of Purwakarta
- In office 13 March 2008 – 13 March 2018
- Vice Regent: Dudung Bachtiar Supardi (2008–2013); Dadan Koswara (2013–2018)
- Preceded by: Lily Hambali Hasan
- Succeeded by: Anne Ratna Mustika

1st Vice Regent of Purwakarta
- In office 13 March 2003 – 13 March 2008
- Regent: Lily Hambali Hasan
- Preceded by: Office established
- Succeeded by: Dudung Bachtiar Supardi

Member of the Purwakarta Regency Regional House of Representatives
- In office 1999–2003

Personal details
- Born: 11 April 1971 (age 55) Subang, Indonesia
- Party: Gerindra (since 2023)
- Other political affiliations: Golkar (1999–2023); KIM Plus (2024–present)
- Spouses: Sri Muliawati (m. 1998; died 1999) Anne Ratna Mustika (m. 2003; div. 2023)
- Children: Maulana Akbar Ahmad Habibie; Yudistira Manunggaling Rahmaning Hurip; Hyang Sukma Ayu
- Parents: Sahlin Ahmad Suryana (father); Kasiti (mother)
- Education: Punawarman College of Law (S.H.); Widyatama University (M.M.)

Dedi Mulyadi (born 11 April 1971), also known as Kang Dedi Mulyadi (Note: "Kang" is a Sundanese term for "older brother" and also respectful term for an older man or as a familiar greeting for men) and by his initials KDM, affectionately called bapak aing ("my dad" in Sundanese), is an Indonesian politician and activist from the Gerindra party who is the 15th governor of West Java, serving since February 2025. He was previously the regent of Purwakarta, holding that position between 2008 and 2018. He had been active in politics since 1999 as a municipal legislator in Purwakarta, and prior to joining Gerindra in 2023, was a member of Golkar.

== Early life and education ==
Dedi Mulyadi was born in Sukasari, Subang on 11 April 1971 as the youngest of nine siblings. His father, Sahlin Ahmad Suryana, was a member of the Indonesian National Armed Forces (TNI) and his mother, Kasiti, an Indonesian Red Cross activist. Mulyadi finished elementary school at SD Subakti in 1984, junior high at SMP Kalijati in 1987 and senior high at SMA Negeri Purwadadi in 1990, all three located in Subang. Afterwards, he moved to Purwakarta to study law at Purnawarman law school until graduating in 1999. He was active in the Muslim Students' Association (Himpunan Mahasiswa Islam). It was in this organisation that he became lifelong friends with Saepul Bahri Binzein, who was elected Regent of Purwakarta in 2024, as well as Purwanto, whom Mulyadi eventually appointed as Head of the Provincial Education Board of West Java.

== Political career ==
In 1999, Mulyadi began his political career as member of Purwakarta's house of representatives for Golkar and the electoral district Tegalwaru. He subsequently was vice-secretary and secretary until he became leader of Golkar's local chapter in 2004. At the age of 32, Mulyadi became the youngest vice-regent, serving under Lily Hambali Hasan's regency over Purwakarta from 2003 to 2008.

=== Regent of Purwakarta ===
Mulyadi was elected as the next regent of Purwakarta in 2008 and again for a second term in 2013. Mulyadi succeeded Irianto MS Syafiuddin as leader of Golkar in its West Java branch in 2016.

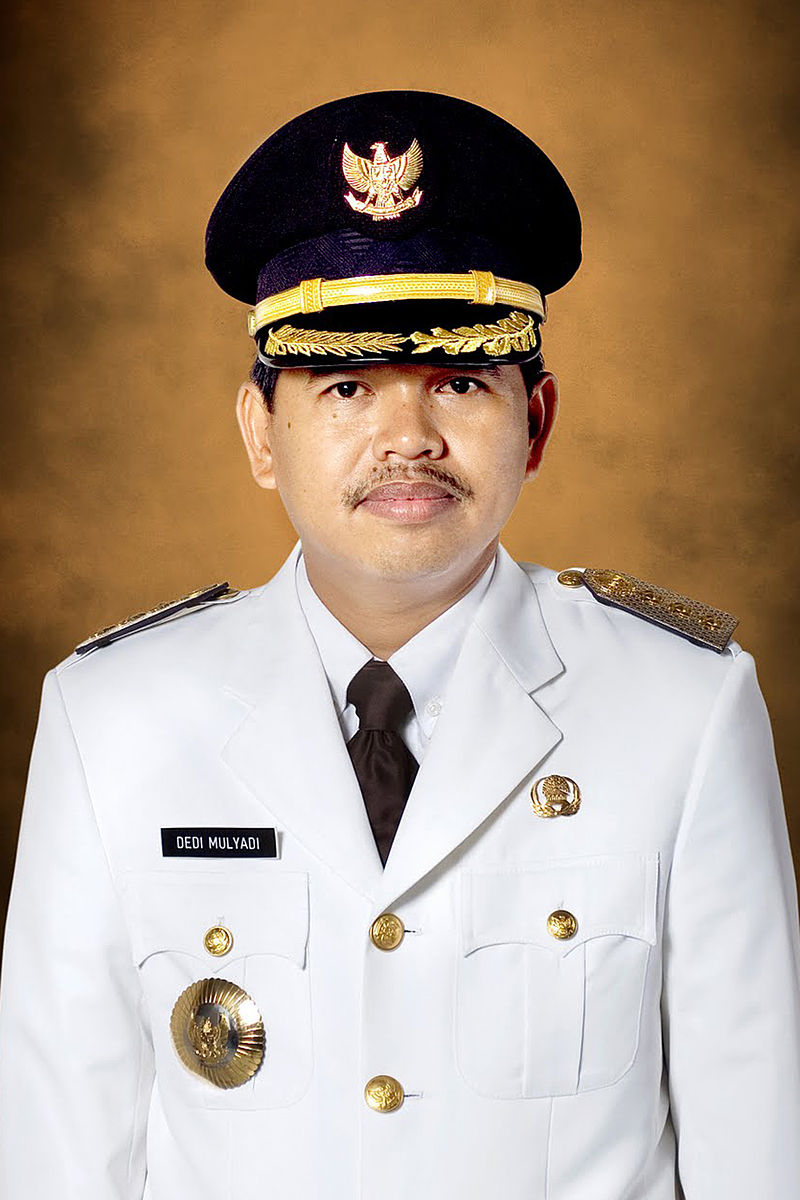
Official portrait of Dedi Mulyadi as Regent of Purwakarta

In 2015–2016, Islamic Defenders Front (FPI) started campaigning against the Dedi Mulyadi administration in Purwakarta. FPI accused the Mulyadi of being a musyrik (polytheist) after he put up statues of Sundanese puppet characters in a number of parks throughout Purwakarta. The FPI also has accused Dedi of debasing Islamic tenets by using the Sundanese greeting sampurasun, instead of the more Islamic as-salamu alaykum. In December 2015, around a hundred FPI members inspected cars passing through the front gate of Taman Ismail Marzuki (TIM) in Central Jakarta where the Indonesia Theater Federation Award was being held, trying to stop Mulyadi from attending the event.

He ran as running mate to Deddy Mizwar in the 2018 gubernatorial election for West Java, but the pair lost. His term as regent expired on 13 March 2018.

=== Member of Parliament ===
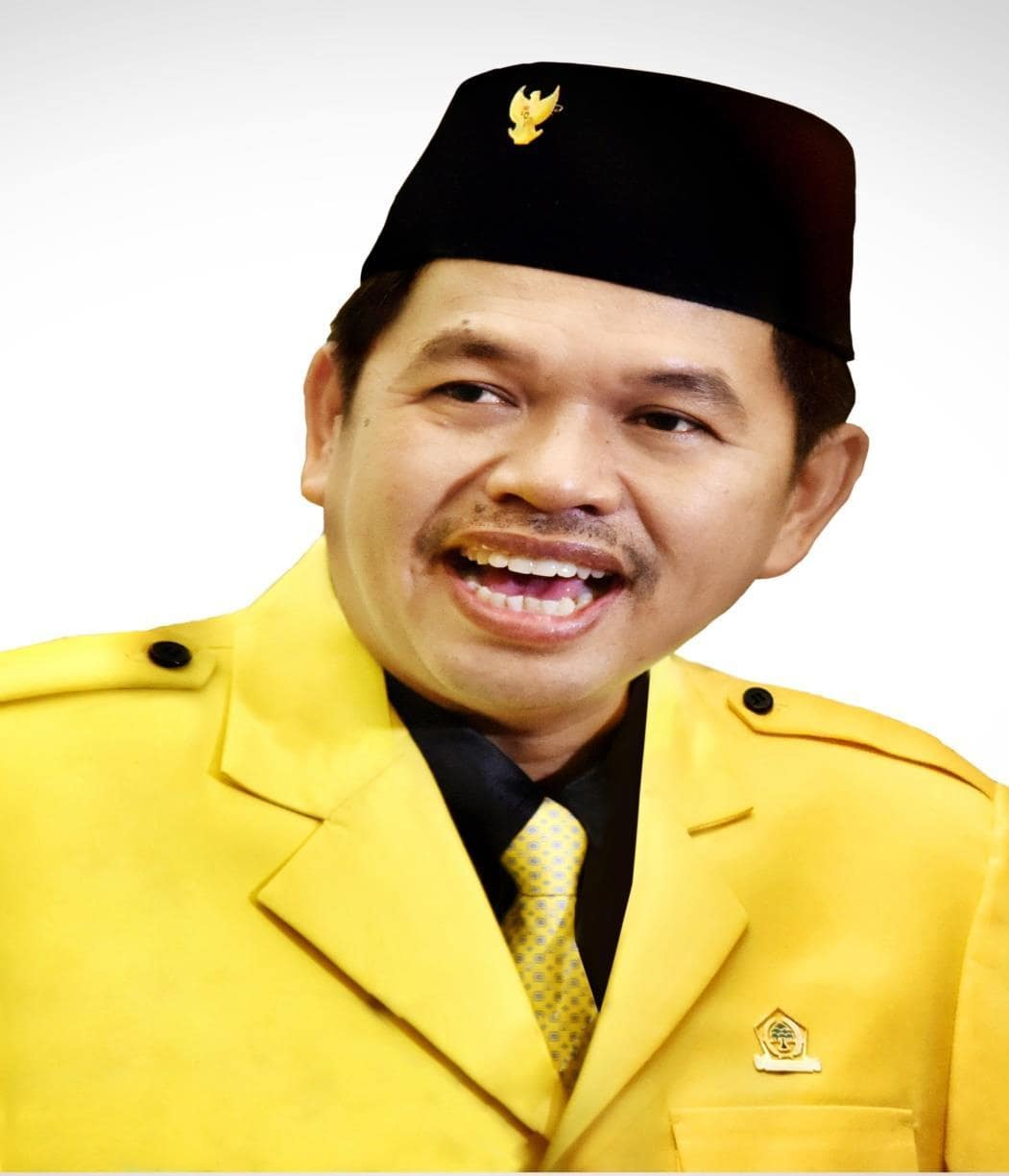
Mulyadi wearing a Golkar Party uniform

Mulyadi ran as a candidate to the People's Representative Council for the 2019 legislative election representing West Java's 7th electoral district under Golkar and secured a seat. Mulyadi also became the head of the West Java campaign team for Joko Widodo in the 2019 Indonesian presidential election. Mulyadi later called for Jakarta's reintegration with West Java following plans to move the capital away from Jakarta, citing historical associations and integrated transport networks.

In May 2023, Mulyadi resigned from Golkar and joined Gerindra. For the 2024 Indonesian general election, he ran as a candidate for Gerindra in the same electoral district. He received 375,658 votes, which was the second largest vote share nationwide after Said Abdullah from East Java XI.

=== Governor ===
In 2024, Mulyadi ran for governor of West Java in the 2024 gubernatorial election, picking Erwan Setiawan as his running mate from the Advanced Indonesia Coalition ticket. The ticket registered themselves to the West Java branch of General Elections Commission. The pair won a landslide victory in the four-way race, securing 14.3 million votes (62%) and winning the most votes in all 27 of West Java's regencies and cities. He was sworn in on 20 February 2025. One of his first actions as governor was to fire a public school principal who had violated a gubernatorial instruction prohibiting school trips leaving the province.

Dedi Mulyadi caught under fire for sending misbehaving children to the army barracks to get rehabilitated. Some parents reported him to the National Commission on Human Rights because they view Dedi's policy deprive the human rights of the child and deviated away from the purpose of education. One such parent said that Dedi has overstepped his authority as governor and the rehabilitation policy is not clearly understood. However, such policy has received support from Minister of Human Rights Natalius Pigai, who said that he would consider enacting Dedi's policy on a nationwide scale, saying that such misbehaving children who love creating chaos and engaging in street fights should be sent to be trained by the Indonesian National Armed Forces to get their mentality, character and discipline in shape. Dedi Mulyadi appreciated the criticism, stating his belief that all criticisms are based on concerns of children and teenagers for their better future and said he is open for collaboration to solve the problem.

According to a poll taken by Indikator on 12–19 May 2025, his approval rating reached 95%, with 41% being "very satisfied". A subsequent poll by Litbang Kompas on 1–5 July 2025 also found that his approval rating was 97.2% and favorability rating 98.6%. A survey by Lembaga Survei Indonesia (LSI), presented on 23 July 2026 to mark 1.5 years since his inauguration as Governor of West Java, found his approval rating had reached 95.4%.

== Political ideology ==
Mulyadi is a traditionalist whose views are informed by Sunda Wiwitan as well as Sufism. He is committed to the belief that the future of Indonesia must be built on its local wisdom and ancestral values. He described the role of a leader as pupuhu or an elder who is spiritually united with their people. This comes from the Sundanese proverb, congo nyurup kana puhu, meaning "the tip of the bamboo is inseparable from its lowest stem", with pupuhu referring to the lowest and oldest part of the plant.

He believes that humans must live in spiritual harmony with nature and its four constitutive elements, land, water, air, and sun, which he views to be in harmonious alignment with each other. This is linked to his spiritual philosophy, which considers God as being immanent in the universe. He therefore aims to achieve a society that is "fertile, prosperous, peaceful and harmonious" (gemah ripah repeh rapih). For this reason, he opposes mining, since he believes that "the Sundanese civilisation is not a metal or iron civilisation, but a bamboo civilisation." He also said that he is a "socialist", since he believes that in traditional Sundanese society, land is communally owned and there is no right to personal property.

Mulyadi also advocates for the Sundanese philosophy of Tri Tangtu di Buana, consisting of silih asah, silih asih, silih asuh (sharpening wisdom, nurturing with love, guiding with care), which applies to the ratu (leader), rama (the people), and resi (teacher). He calls for the Sundanese people to return to the teachings of Prabu Siliwangi, the mythical Hindu King of Pajajaran. For him, development based on Siliwangi teachings mean to ensure that humans live in spiritual unity with their land, water, air, and sun, and therefore nature must be restored from destruction caused by environmental degradation and mining. Mulyadi believes that environmental destruction in West Java is caused by the Sundanese losing their spiritual unity with nature. He once wrote, "Too much energy has been spent chasing economic growth (quantitative), while the inner heart (qualitative) is ignored." Mulyadi also regrets that Indonesian law today no longer seeks to maintain the sacred harmony between man and nature.

In terms of education, Mulyadi draws inspiration from traditional Sundanese philosophy. He believes that the education system must be based on gapura panca waluya, meaning that the students must be raised to become cageur (healthy physically and spiritually), bageur (emphatic), bener (honest), pinter (knowledgeable and wise), and singer (industrious).

== Personal life ==
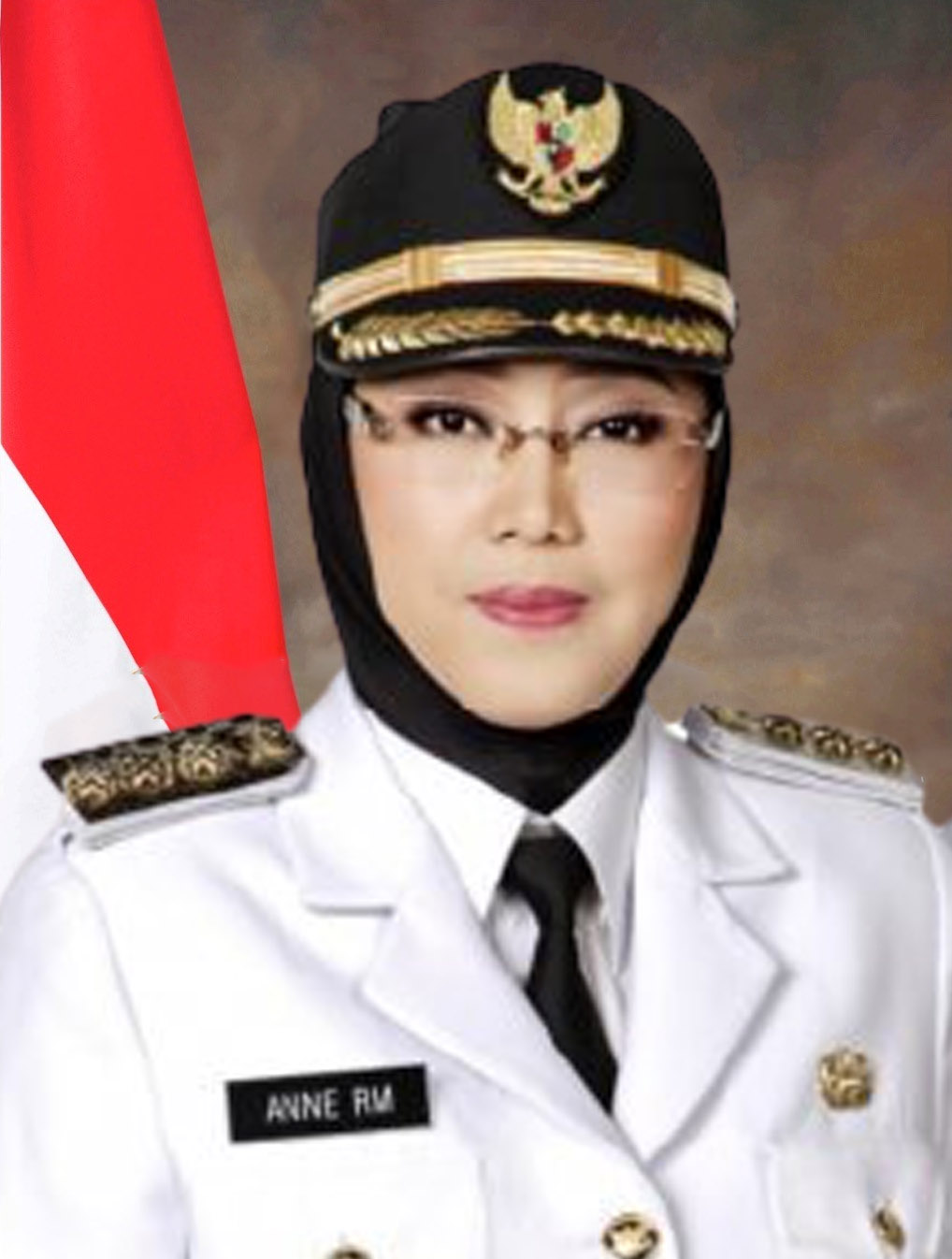
Anne Ratna Mustika, Mulyadi's former wife who has since remarried.

Mulyadi was first married to Sri Muliawati, and they had one son: Maulana Akbar Ahmad Habibie. Maulana Akbar later married Luthfianisa Putri Karlina, the Vice Regent of Garut, on 16 July 2025. After the death of Sri Muliawati, Mulyadi married Anne Ratna Mustika (former Miss Purwakarta, and later Mulyadi's successor as regent). They have two children: Yudistira Manunggaling Rahmaning Hurip and Nyi Hyang Sukma Ayu. Mustika requested a divorce in 2022, and following a court case, the Supreme Court of Indonesia approved the couple's divorce in 2023. Mustika cited psychological abuse as a reason for the divorce.

=== Religion ===
Mulyadi is a Muslim and his spirituality represents a blend of Sufism with Sunda Wiwitan. He considers Wiwitan not as a religion, but a "cultural system" to nurture the harmonious relationship between man and nature. He believes that religion and culture, Islam and Wiwitan, complement each other, instead of being in opposition. In his words, "They blend like sugar and its sweetness" (ibarat gula jeung peueutna). For Mulyadi, Sundanese Islam is Sunda Wiwitan that has been "Islamized through sharia" by two revered Sufi figures, Abah Sepuh and Abah Anom. He observes that "Their journey did not stop at the outward practice of religion (sharia), but moved with deep contemplation into the spiritual realm (tarekat) and even touched its ultimate essence, hakikat."

He views Allah as immanent and interprets the shahada lā ʾilāha ʾillā -llāh (there is no God but Allah) as all creation in the universe continuously glorifying the name of Allah. This interpretation implies that one cannot understand God without being in spiritual unity with the four constitutive elements of the universe: land, water, air, and sun. Therefore, Mulyadi considers a "complete Indonesian human being" (manusia Indonesia seutuhnya or Al-Insān al-Kāmil) to be someone who has achieved manunggaling kawulo gusti or wujûdiyah in Sufism, referring to unio mystica or the spiritual union between man and God. He has cited Sunan Sitijenar, Abah Sepuh, and Abah Anom as his spiritual influences.

Mulyadi believes that "Sundanese society is closer to the teachings of Sufism than to textual-puritan religiosity". The essence of religiosity for him is rasa (inner feeling) of being spiritually united with God. He also observes that the essence of both Islam and Sunda is Kajembaran Rahmaniyah, a phrase written at the entrance of Pesantren Suryalaya, the center of Sufism in West Java. He defines kajembaran as openness of heart, the willingness to accept anyone's presence, including those belonging to different faiths. For him, kajembaran "is an inclusive practice rooted in the awareness that differences are not merely social facts but existential realities." Meanwhile, rahmaniyah means compassion (welas asih), which he views as "the feminine quality inherent in both religion and culture." Mulyadi believes that both Islam and Wiwitan "merge as a bridge for bringing the maternal spirit into our lives."

== Public image ==
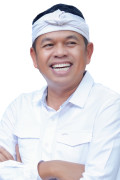
Mulyadi is often seen wearing a traditional Sundanese attire, as demonstrated by this image

Mulyadi has a traditionalist image. After being sworn as governor, Mulyadi held an "ordination" ceremony in the likeness of the Hindu kings of Pajajaran. It symbolised the spiritual legitimacy he received from Nyai Roro Kidul and the ancestors (karuhun). Traditionalists have called him the "incarnation of Prabu Siliwangi", the mythical king of Pajajaran, with a viral TikTok video demonstrating that his feet supposedly matched that of Prabu Surawisesa, the son of Prabu Siliwangi. He also often holds traditional ceremonies involving other Sundanese spiritual figures and deities, such as Sunan Ambu.

As governor, he is based in his home village, Lembur Pakuan, located in Subang Regency around 50 km north of Bandung. His residence is built with traditional Sundanese architecture resembling a royal palace, and is surrounded by paddy fields. According to postdoctoral researcher at the Hertie School Ignatius Yordan Nugraha, "This is reminiscent of how Javanese and Balinese kings used to adhere to what Clifford Geertz in his book on the traditional state in Bali (...) called ‘the doctrine of the exemplary centre’. The king's court and capital constituted a microcosm of the universal and political order. Under this doctrine, if the centre is exemplary, the universe and the political order will also be in harmony." Since he became governor, Lembur Pakuan has become a popular tourist destination.

Mulyadi is skilled in using social media, boasting 8.32 million subscribers on his YouTube channel and 1.65 million subscribers on his second channel, "LEMBUR PAKUAN CHANNEL." Additionally, his TikTok account has 10.1 million followers, his Instagram account has 5.7 million followers, and his Facebook page has 13 million followers. His most viewed TikTok reel has garnered 95.3 million views. For this reason, his critics have derisively dubbed him "the content governor" (gubernur konten). This title was first coined by the Governor of East Kalimantan Rudy Mas'ud.

== Awards and honours ==
- Indonesia
  - Medal of Service in National Culture (Indonesian: Satyalencana Kebudayaan) (2021)

== Election history ==
Election	Position	Constituency	Political party	Number of votes	Election results
1999 Indonesian legislative election	Purwakarta Regency Regional House of Representatives	Unknown data	Golkar	Unknown data	Won
2019 Indonesian legislative election	House of Representatives	West Java VII	Golkar	206,622	Winning

Election	Position	Political party	Number of votes	Election results
2003 Purwakarta regency election	Vice Regent of Purwakarta	Golkar	Unknown data (Note: Indirect election)	Won
2008 Purwakarta regency election	Regent of Purwakarta	Golkar (Note: Nominated by Golkar and Prosperous Justice Party)	155,505	Won
2013 Purwakarta regency election	Regent of Purwakarta	Golkar (Note: Nominated by Golkar, Indonesian Democratic Party of Struggle, National Awakening Party, Gerindra Party, People's Conscience Party and Democratic Renewal Party)	306,332	Won
2018 West Java gubernatorial election	Vice Governor of West Java	Golkar (Note: Nominated by Democratic Party and Golkar)	5,663,198	Lost
2024 West Java gubernatorial election	Governor of West Java	Gerindra Party (Note: Nominated by Gerindra Party, Golkar, Democratic Party, National Mandate Party and Indonesian Solidarity Party)	14,130,192	Won
