= Rahmat Effendi =

Indonesian politician

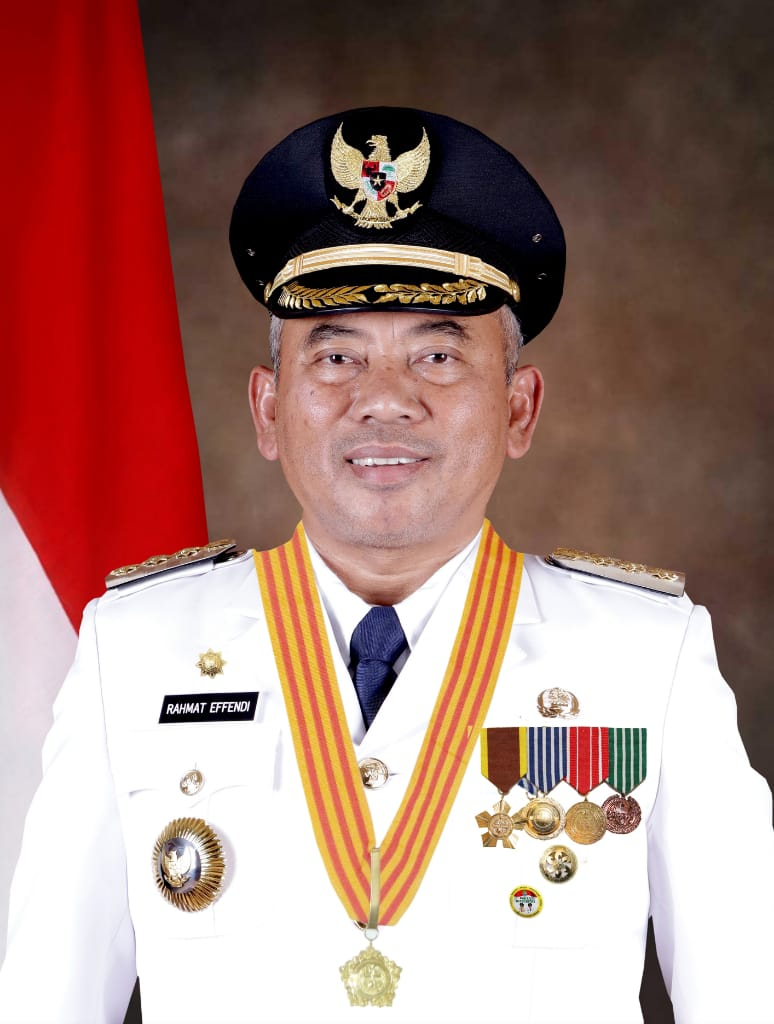
- Official portrait, 2018

4th Mayor of Bekasi
- In office 3 May 2012 – 7 January 2022; Acting: 26 April 2011 – 3 May 2012
- Governor: Ahmad Heryawan; Ridwan Kamil
- Deputy: Ahmad Syaikhu (2012 – 2018); Tri Adhianto Tjahyono (2018 – 2022)
- Preceded by: Mochtar Mohamad
- Succeeded by: Tri Adhianto Tjahyono

Speaker of Bekasi DPRD
- In office 2004–2008

Member of Bekasi DPRD
- In office 1999–2008

Personal details
- Born: 3 February 1964 (age 62) Bekasi, West Java, Indonesia
- Party: Golkar
- Spouse(s): Guniarti Rahmat Effendi; Lusiana Oktora
- Children: 4
- Education: STIA Bagasasi; Pasundan University

Rahmat Effendi (born 3 February 1964), sometimes nicknamed Pepen, is an Indonesian politician of the Golkar party who served as the mayor of Bekasi between 3 May 2012 and 7 January 2022. Previously, he had served as the acting Mayor since 2011 in place of his predecessor who was arrested on corruption charges.

== Personal life ==
Effendi was born in Bekasi on February 3, 1964 as one of six siblings. After graduating from high school, he obtained his Bachelor's (2000) and Master's (2006) in STIA (Sekolah Tinggi Ilmu Administrasi, Higher Institute of Administration) Bagasasi before receiving his Doctorate from Pasundan University in 2010.

He has multiple wives, first being H.G. Guniarti and the second one being Lusiana Oktora. He has four children.

== Career ==
Prior to entering politics, Effendi worked as a logistics supervisor in Halliburton Indonesia, and later as a director in a mechanical supply company.

=== Political career ===
He was a member of Bekasi's Regional People's Representative Council between 1999 and 2008, and he was its speaker since 2004. He was elected as deputy of Mochtar Mohamad in 2008.

In 2011, Mochtar was arrested and non-activated for investigations of bribery and misuse of city funds. During this period, Effendi served as acting mayor until Mochtar was found guilty and sentenced to six years in prison in March 2012. In May, Effendi was elevated to mayor officially.

He ran in the 2013 local elections, and won by securing 43 percent of the vote. Later, his victory was disputed by his rivals over administrative reasons, since he did not register his second wife in the election process. As mayor, Effendi refused to revoke permits to four churches when protested by groups.

He was reelected following the 2018 election, securing 67.5% of the votes. On 5 January 2022, he was arrested by the Corruption Eradication Commission under suspicions of receiving bribery and selling government positions.
