= Desy Ratnasari =

Indonesian actress, singer and politician (born 1973)

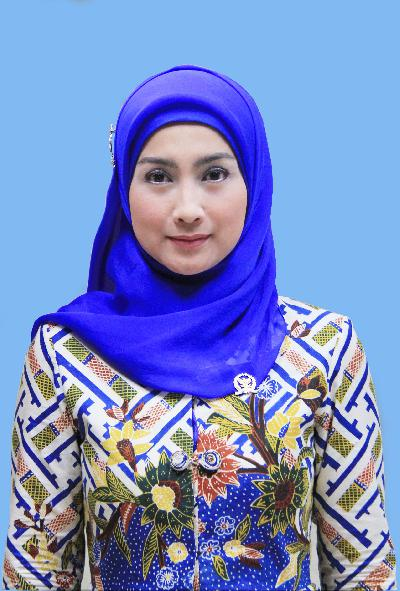

Member of the Indonesia Parliament for West Java IV
- Incumbent
- Assumed office 2014

Personal details
- Born: Desy Ratnasari; 12 December 1973 (age 52) Sukabumi, West Java, Indonesia
- Party: National Mandate Party
- Education: University of Indonesia; Atma Jaya Catholic University of Indonesia
- Occupation: Actress; Model; Presenter; Singer; Politician
- Musical career
- Genre: Pop
- Label: GP Records

Desy Ratnasari (born 12 December 1973) is an Indonesian actress, singer and politician of Sundanese descent. She is currently serving as a member of the People's Representative Council from National Mandate Party.

== Life ==
Ratnasari was born in Sukabumi in 1973. She was a model who became an actor, presenter and singer. She and her husband, Sammy, have one child. Amongst her films are the 1990 films Blok M and Guntur tengah malam and in 2001 she appeared in Telegram.

In 1999 she won a Panasonic award for best Television actress.

== Political career ==
In 2014, she was elected to become a member of the People's Representative Council by the West Java IV electoral district. She was reelected in 2019.
