= Mochtar Mohamad =

Indonesian politician

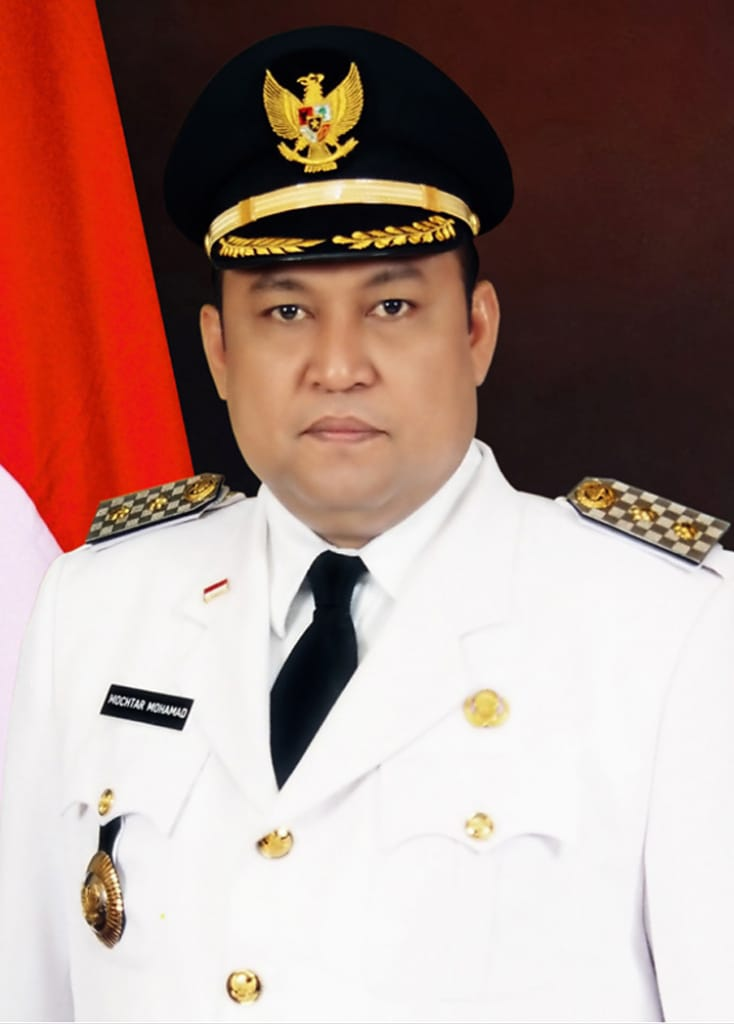

Mayor of Bekasi
- In office 10 March 2008 – 7 March 2012
- Preceded by: Akhmad Zurfaih
- Succeeded by: Rahmat Effendi

Deputy Mayor of Bekasi
- In office 2003–2008

Member of Bekasi City Council
- In office 1999–2003

Personal details
- Born: 26 October 1964 (age 60); Gorontalo, Indonesia
- Political party: PDI-P

Mochtar Mohamad (born 26 October 1964) is an Indonesian politician who was the Mayor of Bekasi between 2008 and 2012, when he was convicted of corruption and bribery and sentenced to prison. He was released in 2015, and returned to politics.

== Early life ==
Mochtar was born in Gorontalo on 26 October 1964 and was educated there, graduating from high school in 1987. He later earned a bachelor's degree in 2007. Mochtar is married to Sumiyati, and their eldest son Gilang Esa Mohamad was elected into Bekasi's DPRD in 2024.

== Career ==
He joined Bekasi's city council in 1999, and he served there until 2003 when he became the deputy mayor under Golkar politician Akhmad Zurfaih. In the 2008 mayoral election, he ran as a mayoral candidate and won after securing 50.5 percent of the votes in a three-candidate race. He was sworn in on 10 March 2008. During his mayoralship, the city government issued incentive payments to neighborhood (i.e. rukun tetangga and rukun warga) chiefs in the city.

In March 2009, Mochtar took on a personal loan of Rp 1 billion (around US$100,000), and then used parts of the city's budget to pay off the debt, totalling Rp 639 million being transferred to his personal account. Additionally, in December 2009, some Rp 4.3 billion from the city's budget was used to bribe some city council members into passing the city's 2010 budget. Another bribery case occurred in 2010, when financial auditors from the Audit Board of Indonesia received money to give a positive assessment, and he later also bribed judges to win the Adipura award.

The Corruption Eradication Commission (KPK) formally accused Mochtar on corruption charges in November 2010, covering the misuse of funds, bribery of the city council and Adipura judges, with the auditor bribes still at that time under investigation. The Corruption Court in Bandung released its verdict regarding Mochtar's case in 2011, declaring him innocent of all charges, which was the first time a KPK suspect was declared such. One of the judges in the ad hoc trial was later found by the Supreme Court to have been convicted of corruption in the past. Following an appeal to the Supreme Court, Mochtar was instead found guilty of corruption charges and was sentenced to six years in prison on 7 March 2012.

=== Post-jail ===
By June 2015, Mochtar had been released from imprisonment. He attempted to run against his former deputy Rahmat Effendi in the 2018 mayoral elections, but his party PDI-P decided against endorsing him. Instead, his wife Sumiyati Mochtar Mohamad ran as PDI-P's candidate. He declared that he will run in the 2024 mayoral election, but again failed to secure PDI-P's endorsement.
