= Ahmad Heryawan =

Indonesian politician (born 1966)

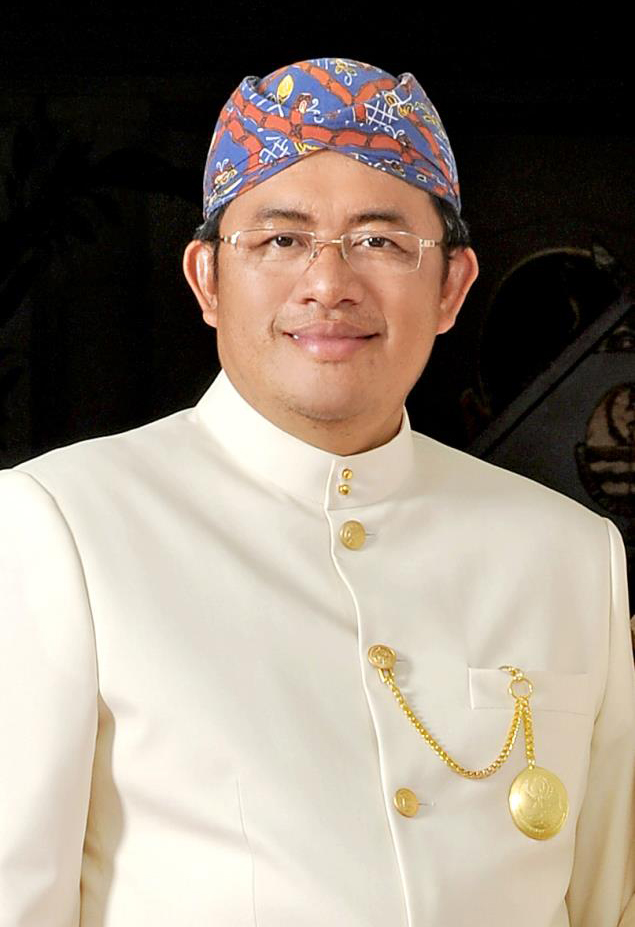
- Ahmad Heryawan in 2013

President of the Prosperous Justice Party
- Acting
- In office 19 September 2024 – 19 November 2024
- Preceded by: Ahmad Syaikhu
- Succeeded by: Al Muzzammil Yusuf

13th Governor of West Java
- In office 13 June 2008 – 13 June 2018
- Vice Governor: Yusuf Macan Effendie (2008–2013); Deddy Mizwar (2013–2018)
- Preceded by: Danny Setiawan
- Succeeded by: Iwa Karniwa (acting); Ridwan Kamil

Deputy Speaker of the Jakarta Regional House of Representatives
- In office 4 October 2004 – 13 June 2008 Serving with Ilal Ferhard and Maringan Pangaribuan
- Speaker: Ade Surapriatna
- Preceded by: Johny Wenas Polii
- Succeeded by: Dani Anwar

Personal details
- Born: 19 June 1966 (age 59) Sukabumi, West Java, Indonesia
- Party: Prosperous Justice Party
- Spouse: Netty Prasetiyani (m. 1991)
- Children: 6
- Website: www.ahmadheryawan.net

Ahmad Heryawan (born 19 June 1966) is an Indonesian politician who served as the governor of West Java Province between 2008 and 2018. He was inaugurated in April 2008, after winning the West Java gubernatorial election in March 2008. Ahmad Heryawan, together with his running mate Yusuf Macan Effendie (also known as Dede Yusuf), was the governor candidate from the Prosperous Justice Party (PKS) and National Mandate Party (PAN) coalition, running the gubernatorial election against Agum Gumelar – Nu'man Abdul Hakim from Indonesian Democratic Party of Struggle (PDIP) and United Development Party (PPP) coalition and Danny Setiawan – Iwan Ridwan Sulandjana from Golkar and Democratic Party (PD) coalition.

Before entering the gubernatorial election, Ahmad Heryawan was a member of Jakarta House of Representatives, taking position as one of the vice chairmen of the house.

His second term as governor ended on 13 June 2018 and he was replaced by acting governor Iwa Karniwa.

Political offices
Preceded by Danny Setiawan	Governor of West Java; 2008–2018	Succeeded by Ridwan Kamil
