= Uu Ruzhanul Ulum =

Indonesian politician (born 1969)

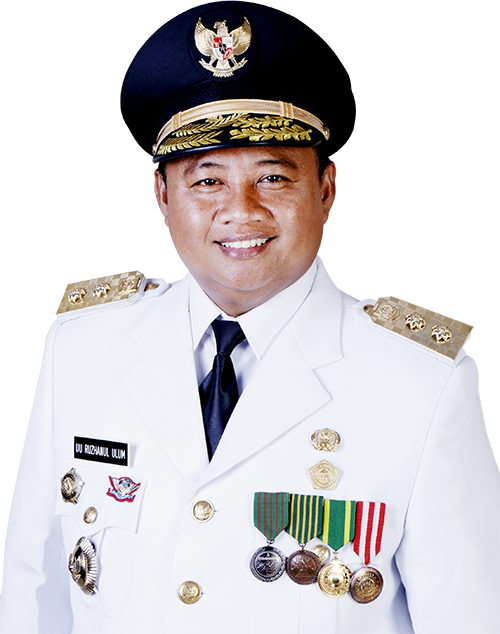

Vice Governor of West Java
- In office 5 September 2018 – 5 September 2023
- Governor: Ridwan Kamil
- Preceded by: Deddy Mizwar
- Succeeded by: Erwan Setiawan

Regent of Tasikmalaya
- In office 8 March 2011 – 5 September 2018
- Preceded by: Tatang Farhanul Hakim
- Succeeded by: Ade Sugianto

Speaker of Tasikmalaya Regency Council
- In office 2004–2009
- Succeeded by: Ruhimat

Member of Tasikmalaya Regency Council
- In office 1999–2011

Personal details
- Born: 10 May 1969 (age 57) Tasikmalaya Regency, West Java
- Party: PPP
- Education: Siliwangi University

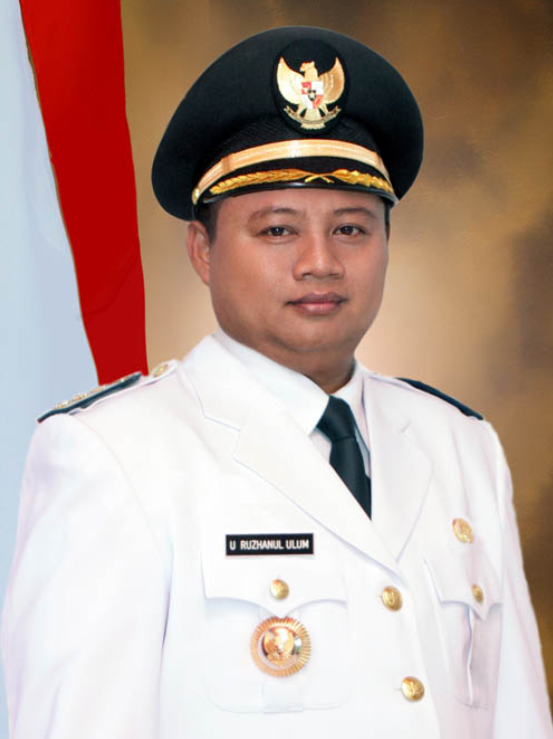
Official portrait as Regent of Tasikmalaya (2016)

Uu Ruzhanul Ulum (born 10 May 1969) is an Indonesian politician who is the Vice Governor of West Java. Before, he served as regent of Tasikmalaya.

Before being elected as Ridwan Kamil's running mate, Uu spent nineteen years holding various political offices in his home regency, serving as the regent between 2011 and 2018.

== Background ==
Uu Ruzhanul Ulum was born in Tasikmalaya on 10 May 1969. He graduated from highschool in 1988, having also studied in several pesantren throughout his education. Later on, he graduated from Siliwangi University in 1997 with a bachelor in economics.

== Career ==
=== Tasikmalaya ===
His involvement in politics began in highschool, when he became a board member of a local United Development Party (PPP) branch office. Later on, he would take up leadership in the party's regency (1997-2010) and provincial branches (2011-).

In 1999, he was elected into the Tasikmalaya Regency Council. He was re-elected in 2004 and 2009, serving as the council speaker in his second term.

Running in the regency elections of 2011 with Ade Sugianto with his running mate, the pair won 263,003 votes (32.34%). He was sworn in on 8 March 2011. For his second term, Uu ran as a single candidate and managed to secure a majority of the votes (around 67 percent). When sworn in for his second term on 23 March 2016, Uu declared his intention to run as governor.

He received a Development Medal from the President of Indonesia in 2017 for his contributions in agriculture.

=== Vice governor ===
Uu was appointed by his political party to become Bandung mayor Ridwan Kamil's running mate in the 2018 gubernatorial election. The pair managed to secure 32.38 percent of votes in the four-way race, winning in 14 subdivisions although losing in Uu's home region of Tasikmalaya. The pair was sworn in on 5 September 2018.
