= Mayor of Tasikmalaya =

- Wali Kota Tasikmalaya
- Coat of arms of Tasikmalaya

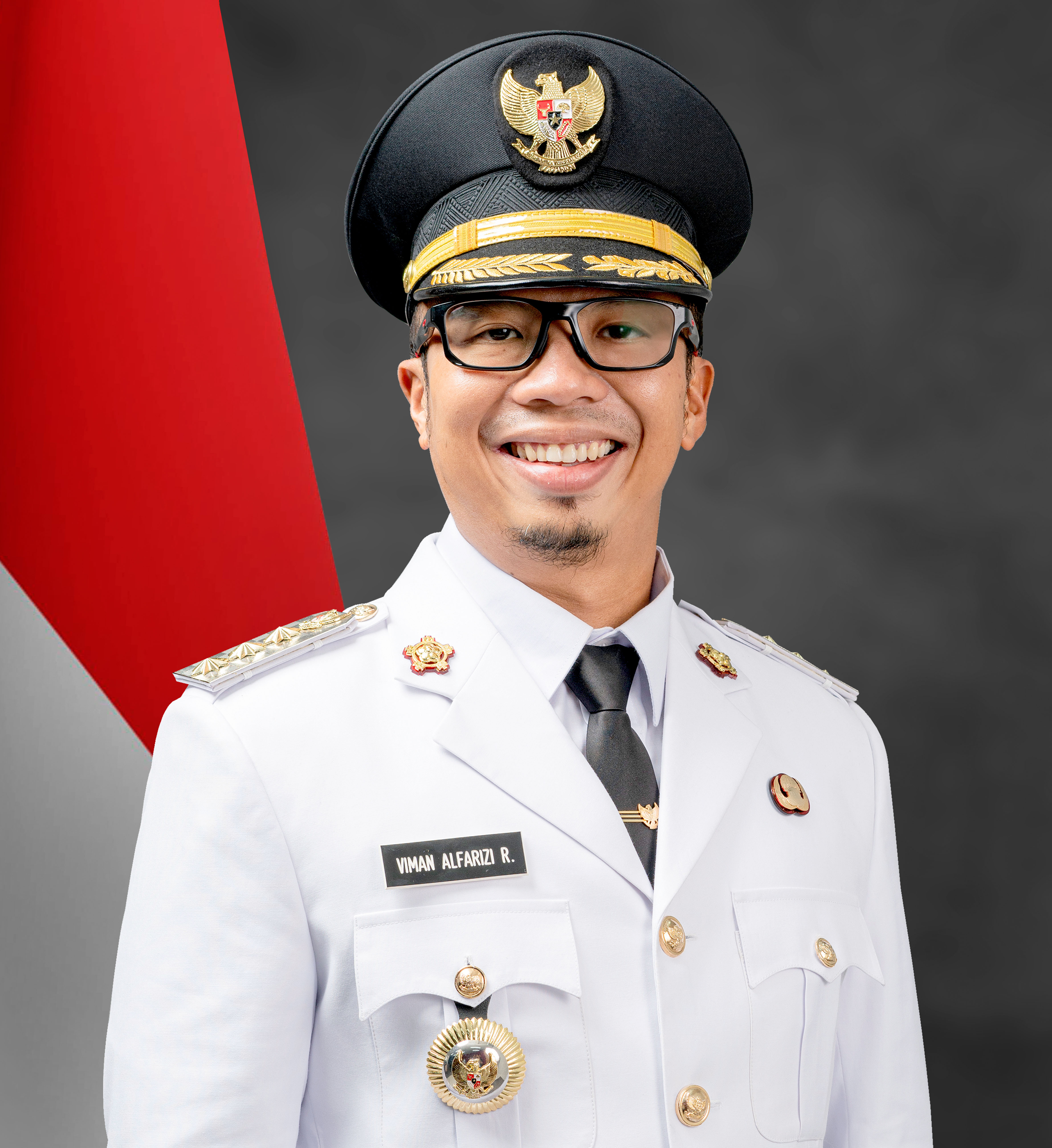
- Incumbent; Viman Alfarizi Ramadhan since 20 February 2025
- Formation: 1976
- First holder: Drs. H. Oman Roesman
- Website: Tasikmalaya City Executive Government

Mayor of Tasikmalaya is the head of the second-level region who holds the government in Tasikmalaya together with the Vice Mayor and 45 members of the Tasikmalaya City Regional House of Representatives. The mayor and vice mayor of Tasikmalaya are elected through general elections held every 5 years. The first mayor of Tasikmalaya was Oman Roesman.

== List ==
The following is a list of the names of the Mayors of Tasikmalaya from time to time.

Mayors of Tasikmalaya
Num	Portrait	Mayor	Beginning of office	End of Term	Political Party / Faction	Period	Note	Deputy Mayor
1		Drs. H. Oman Roesman	1976	1981	Independent	1	(Note: It has the status of an Administrative City, so the Mayor is elected by the Parent Regency (Tasikmalaya Regency) and has the status of a Civil Servant.)	N/A
1		Drs. H. Oman Roesman	1981	1985	Independent	2	(Note: It has the status of an Administrative City, so the Mayor is elected by the Parent Regency (Tasikmalaya Regency) and has the status of a Civil Servant.)	N/A
2		H. Yeng Ds. Partawinata	1985	1989	Independent	3	(Note: It has the status of an Administrative City, so the Mayor is elected by the Parent Regency (Tasikmalaya Regency) and has the status of a Civil Servant.)	N/A
3		Drs. R. Y. Wahyu	1989	1992	Independent	4	(Note: It has the status of an Administrative City, so the Mayor is elected by the Parent Regency (Tasikmalaya Regency) and has the status of a Civil Servant.)	N/A
4		H. Erdhi Hardhiana	1992	1994	Independent	4	(Note: It has the status of an Administrative City, so the Mayor is elected by the Parent Regency (Tasikmalaya Regency) and has the status of a Civil Servant.)	N/A
4		H. Erdhi Hardhiana	1994	1999	Independent	5	(Note: It has the status of an Administrative City, so the Mayor is elected by the Parent Regency (Tasikmalaya Regency) and has the status of a Civil Servant.)	N/A
5		Drs. H. Bubun Bunyamin	1999	2001	Independent	6	(Note: This period still had the status of an Administrative City, until it was transformed into an autonomous city in 2001 and Drs. H. Wahyu Suradiharja was appointed as Acting Mayor of Tasikmalaya (2001-2002) until he was elected as the definitive Mayor by the Regional People's Representative Council (DPRD).)	N/A
5		Drs. H. Bubun Bunyamin	2002	2007	Independent	7	(Note: Elected as Mayor by the Tasikmalaya City Council (DPRD) and became the first Mayor of Tasikmalaya since its transformation into an autonomous city.)	Syarif Hidayat
6		Drs. H. Syarif Hidayat M.Si	2007	2012	National Mandate Party	8	(Note: First mayor elected through general elections)	Dede Sudrajat
7		Drs. H. Budi Budiman	2012	2017	United Development Party	9		Dede Sudrajat
7		Drs. H. Budi Budiman	2017	2020	United Development Party	10 (2012)	(Note: Budi Budiman was dismissed from his position as mayor due to a corruption case. Deputy Mayor Muhammad Yusuf was appointed acting mayor.)	Muhammad Yusuf
		Drs. H. Muhammad Yusuf	23 October 2020	10 September 2021	Golkar	10 (2012)	(Note: As Acting Regent)	N/A
8		Drs. H. Muhammad Yusuf	10 September 2021	15 November 2022	Golkar	10 (2012)	(Note: Muhammad Yusuf was officially inaugurated as the definitive Mayor of Tasikmalaya for the remainder of the 2021-2022 term.)	N/A
		Dr. Cheka Virgowansyah S.STP. M.E (Acting)	15 November 2022	28 November 2024	Independent	—	(Note: As Acting Mayor appointed by the Government to fill the vacant position pending the election of the definitive Mayor from the results of the 2024 Simultaneous Regional Elections)	N/A
		Drs. Asep Sukmana M.Si. (Acting)	28 November 2024	20 February 2025	Independent	—	(Note: As Acting Mayor appointed by the Government to fill the vacant position pending the election of the definitive Mayor from the results of the 2024 Simultaneous Regional Elections)	N/A
9		Viman Alfarizi Ramadhan S.T., M.B.A	20 February 2025	Incumbent	Gerindra	11 (2024)		Dicky Candra

== See also ==
- Tasikmalaya
- List of incumbent regional heads and deputy regional heads in West Java
