= Bandung Techno Park =

Research park in Bandung, Indonesia

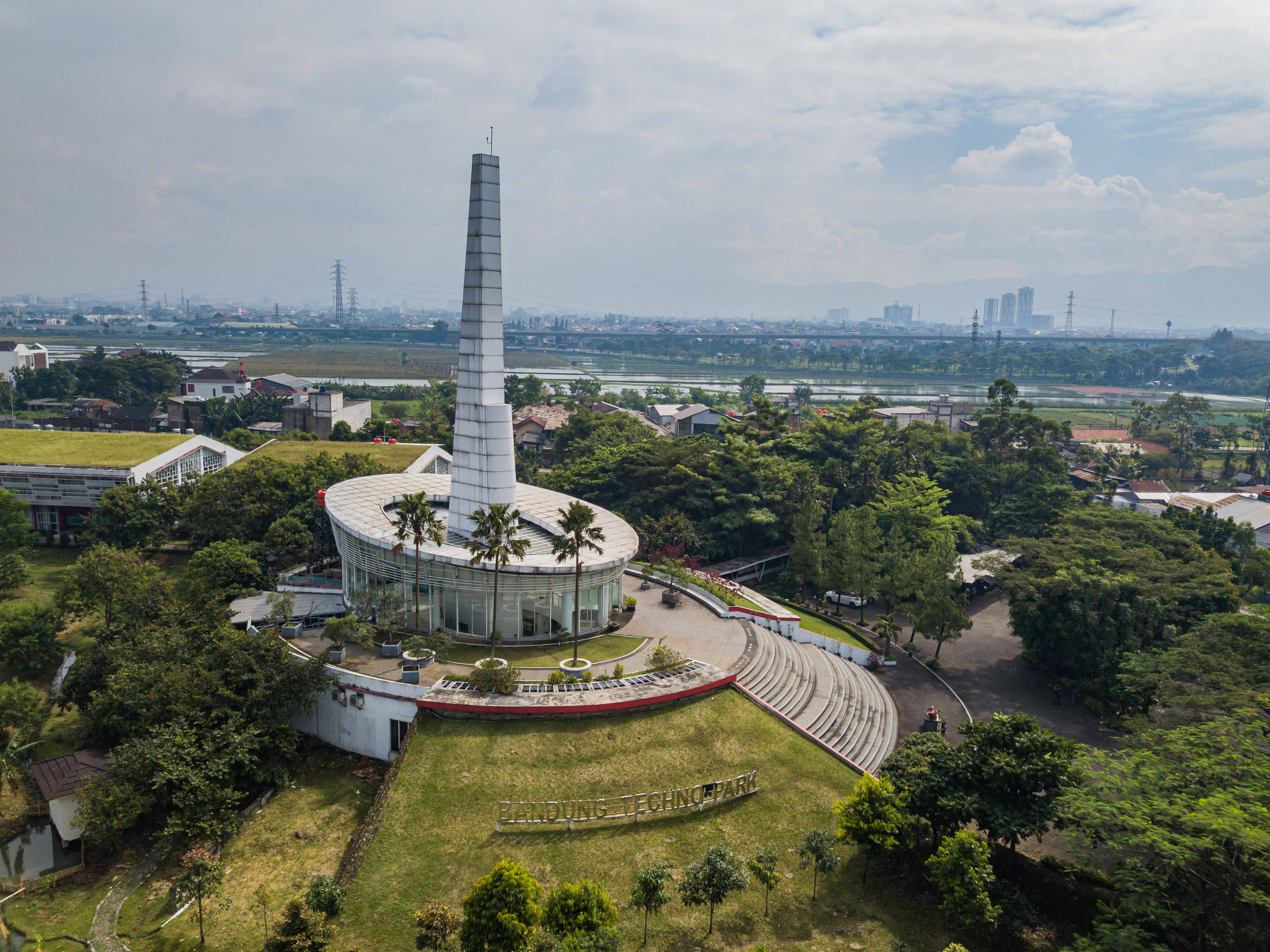
- Bandung Techno Park main building
- Interactive map of Bandung Techno Park
- Location: Bandung, West Java, Indonesia
- Coordinates: 6°58′13.7″S 107°37′49.2″E
- Opening date: January 19, 2010
- Developer: Bandung Technoplex
- Manager: Koredianto Usman
- Owner: Telkom University
- Architect: Je Feriasthama
- Size: 13.5 acres (5.5 ha)
- Website: www.btp.or.id

The Bandung Techno Park (BTP) is a technology park located in the Bandung Technoplex area, West Java. It was established on January 19, 2010, in collaboration with the quadruple helix model between the Telkom Institute of Technology (now Telkom University), the Ministry of Industry, and the Office of West Java Industry and Trade Service. It is one of the oldest techno parks in Indonesia by housed startup companies in the technology sector.

== History ==
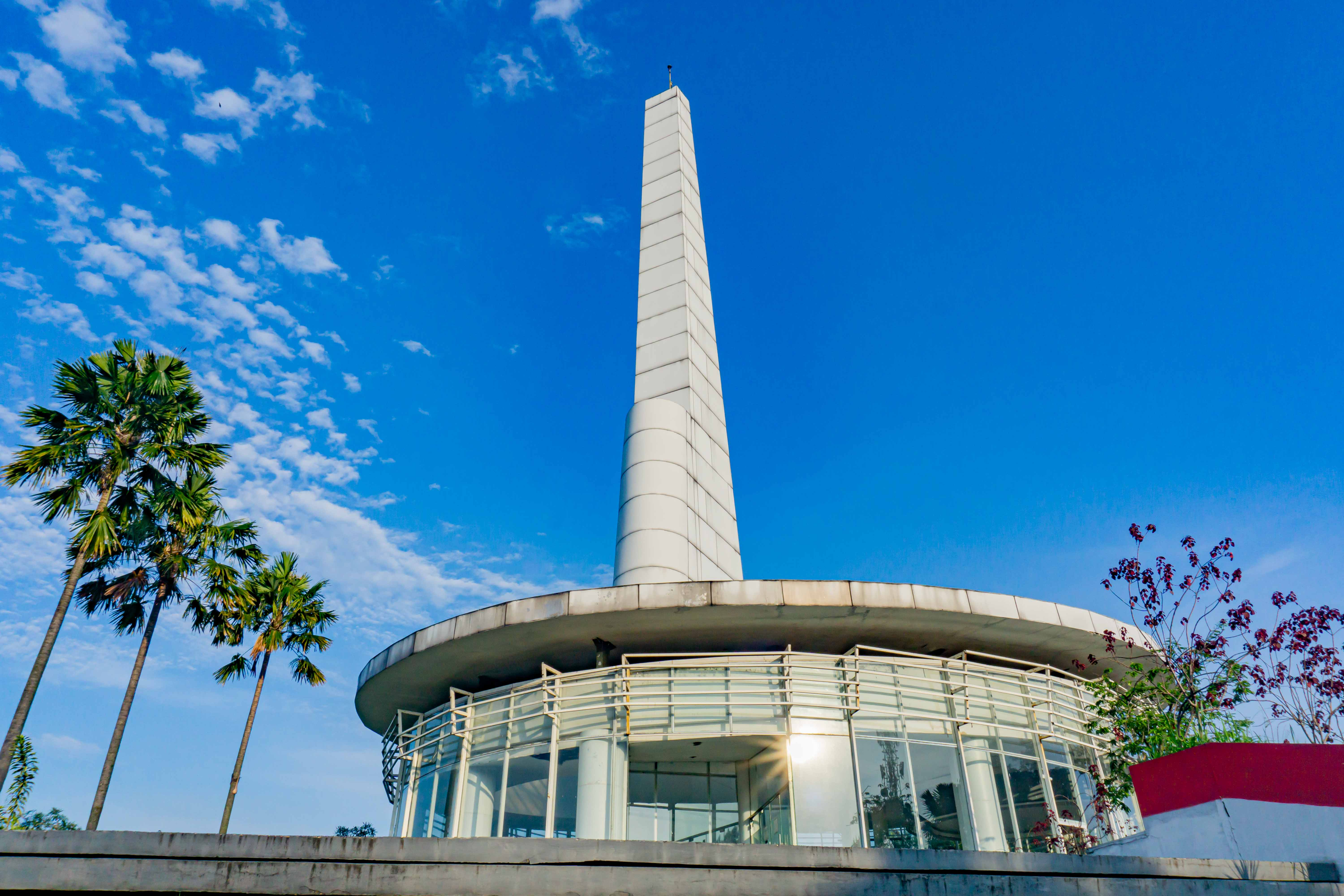
Bandung Techno Park was inaugurated on January 19, 2010, by the Minister of Industry, MS Hidayat.

In 2007, the Telkom Institute of Technology (now Telkom University) established a Technical Implementation Unit of Communication and Information Technology (Indonesian: Unit Pelaksana Teknis Teknologi Informasi Komunikasi) to develop startups in the field of technology. The activities of this unit are supported by the Ministry of Industry and the Office of West Java Industry and Trade Service.

IT Telkom was entrusted by the Ministry of Industry to develop the Telecommunications Design Center (Indonesian: Pusat Desain Telekomunikasi or PDT) in 2009, which then formed an advanced part of the business incubator in 2010. It was inaugurated at the Telkom Institute of Technology Learning Center Building on January 12, 2010, which was also groundbreaking for the establishment of the Bandung Techno Park in the IT Telkom campus area.

Telematics Technical Implementation Unit and the Telecommunications Design Center became the forerunner to the establishment of the Bandung Techno Park on January 19, 2010. It was inaugurated by the incumbent Minister of Industry, MS Hidayat. Since its inception, BTP was part of IT Telkom until November 2011.

After that, Bandung Techno Park separated itself and became the authority of the Telkom Foundation. In 2015, Bandung Techno Park began building two new buildings funded by the Telkom Foundation, the Ministry of Industry, and the Ministry of Research and Technology. It was given 10% of the total area of Bandung Technoplex. Both buildings were completed and inaugurated on 16 January 2018 by the incumbent Minister of Industry, Airlangga Hartarto. Also since 2018, Bandung Techno Park has joined Telkom University and has become a university directorate.

== Facilities ==
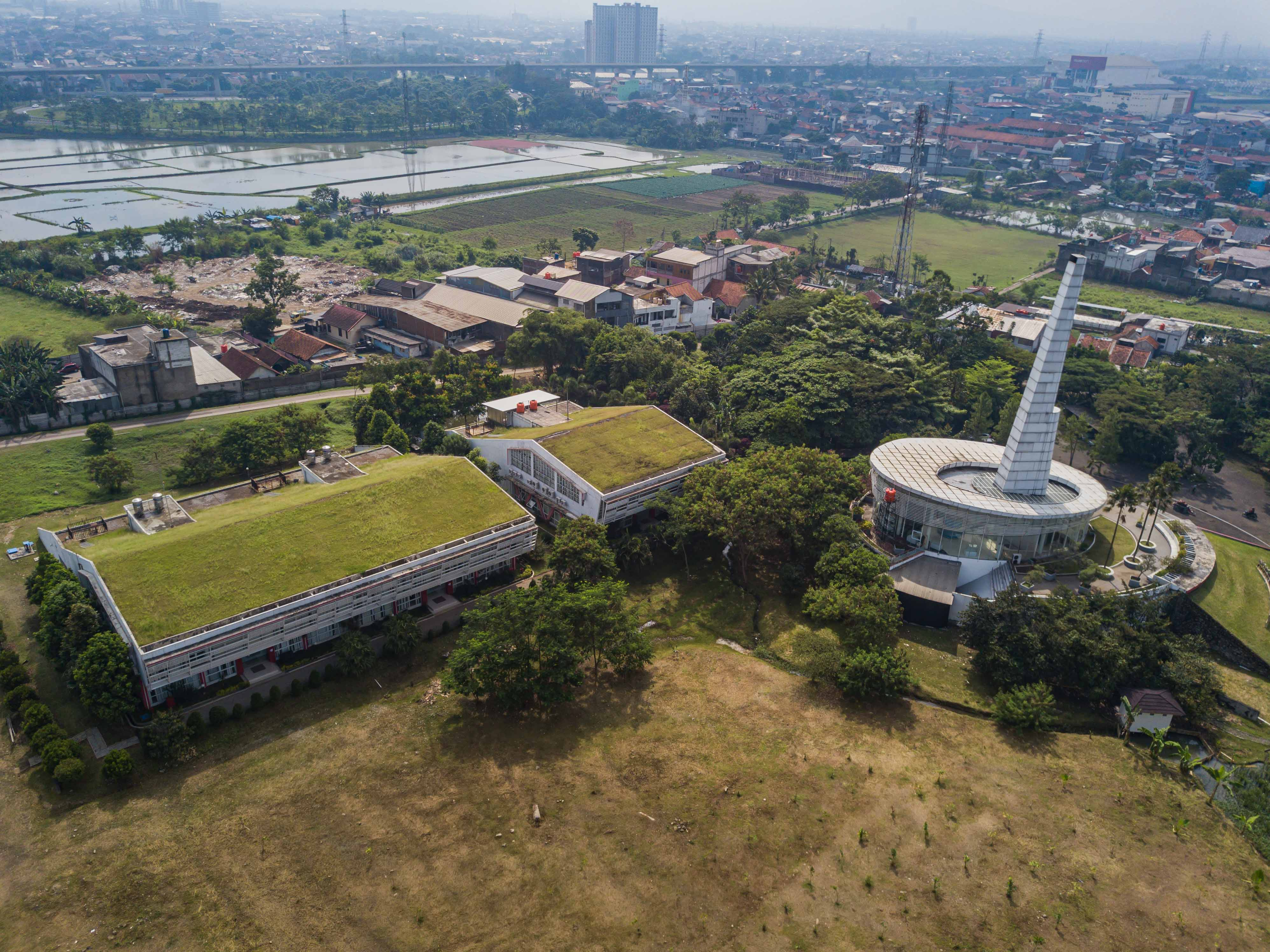
The Telematics Innovation Center Building and the Electronics Innovation Center Building.

The Bandung Techno Park has two buildings, the Telematics Innovation Center Building and the Electronics Innovation Center Building with a 400 m road entrance.

The main programs are business incubation, research, product customization, and services such as intellectual property, management consulting, IT consulting, supporting INDI 4.0 assessment, co-working space, and training center.

== See also ==
- Business cluster
- Mega-Site
- Technology park
- Golden Triangle of Jakarta
