= 2024 Tasikmalaya mayoral election =

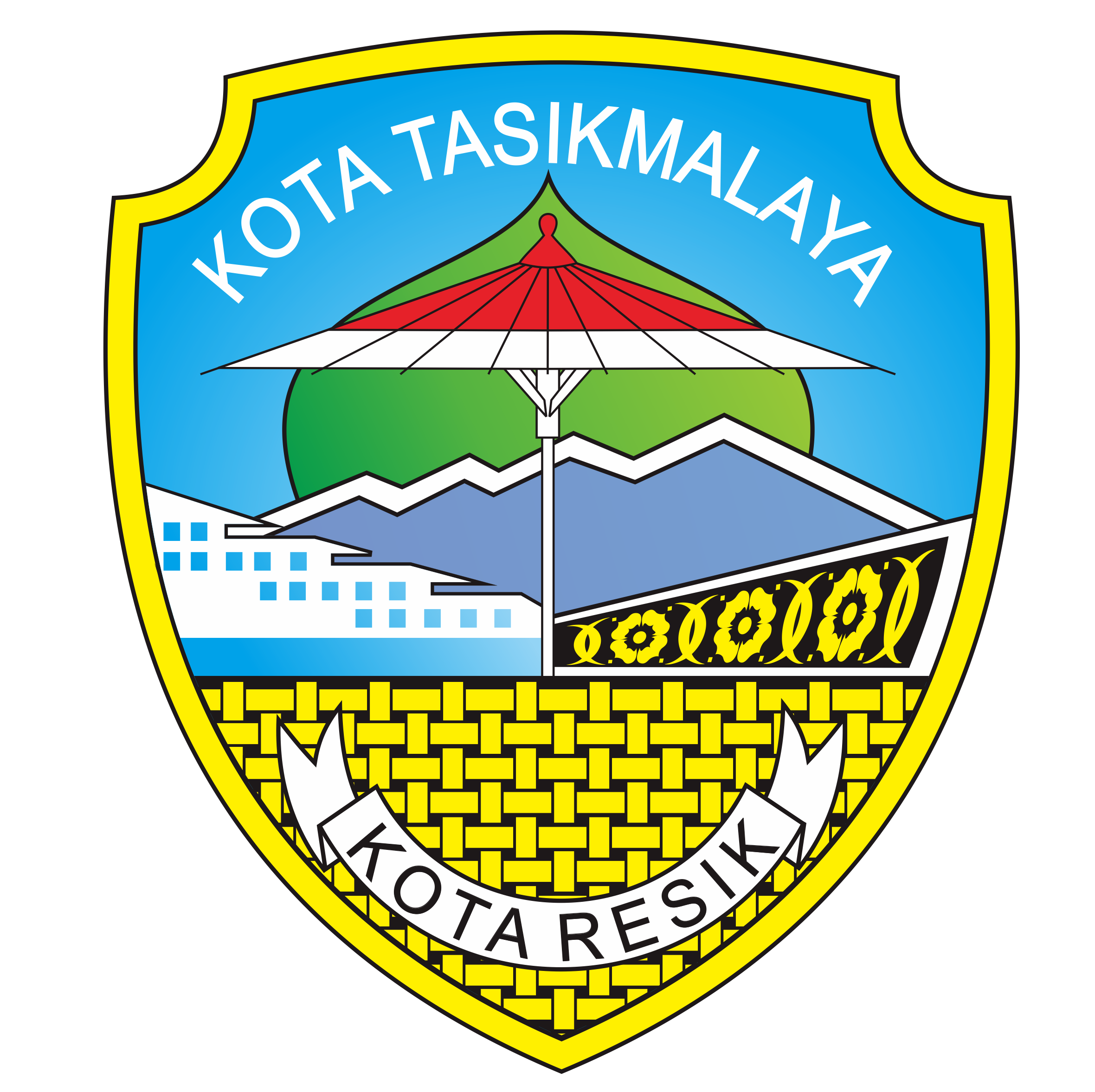
- 27 November 2024
- Turnout: 76.91%
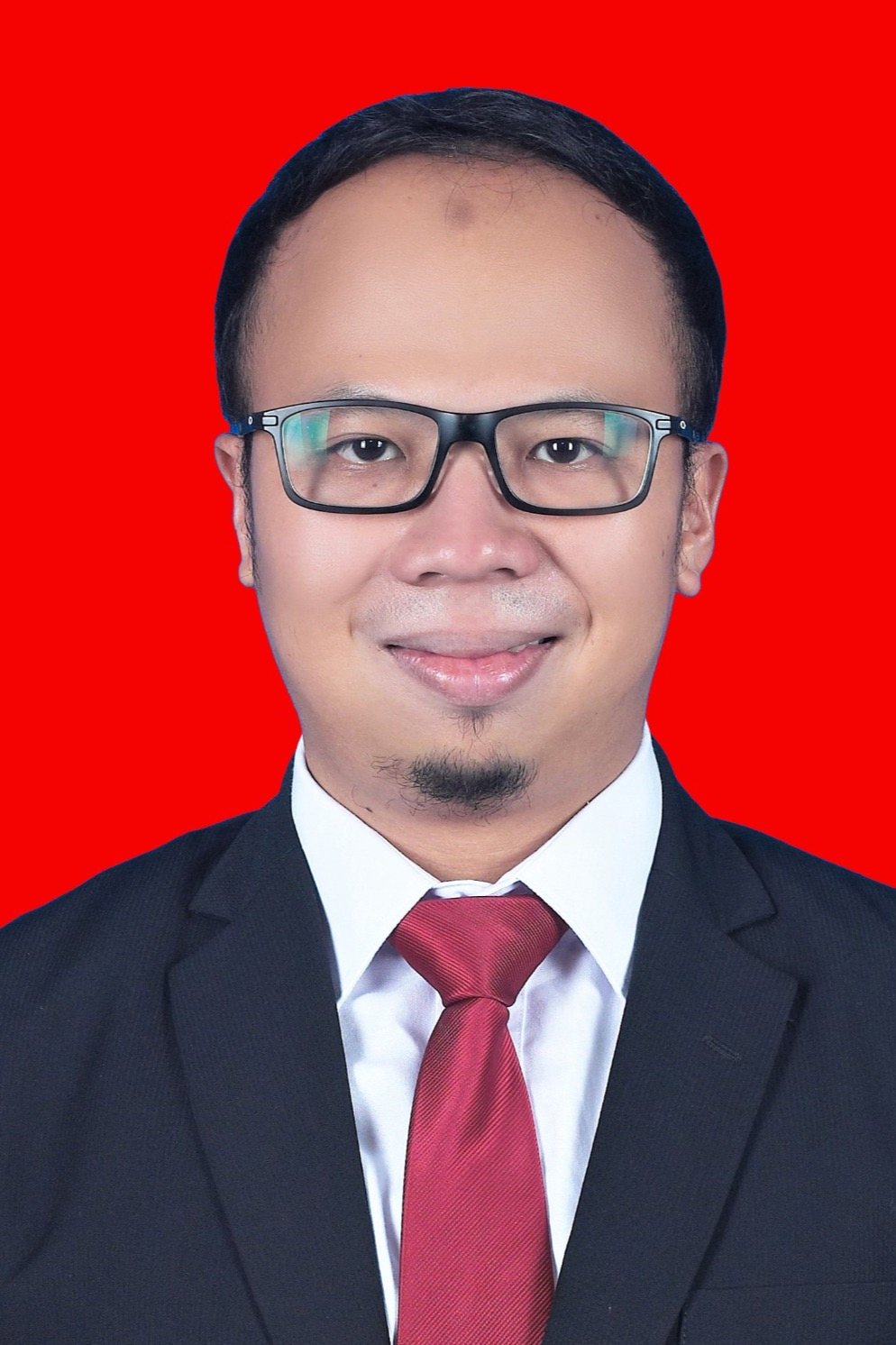

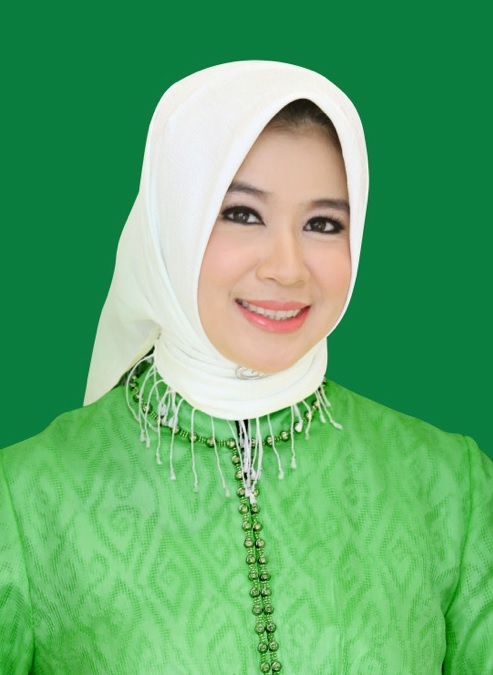

Candidate	Viman Alfarizi Ramadhan	Ivan Dicksan Hasanudin
Party	Gerindra	PKS
Running mate	Dicky Candra	Dede Muhammad Muharam
popular vote	193,225	83,046
Percentage	48.34%	20.78%
Candidate	Nurhayati Effendi	Yanto Aprianto
Party	PPP	PKB
Running mate	Muslim	Aminudin Bustomi
popular vote	63,875	40,201
Percentage	15.98%	10.06%
- Results by district and subdistrict
Mayor before election
Muhammad Yusuf (Note: Term ended in 2022. Two acting mayors served in the interim: Cheka Virgowansyah (2022–2024) and Asep Sukmana (2024–2025).)
Golkar
Elected mayor
Viman Alfarizi Ramadhan
Gerindra

The 2024 Tasikmalaya mayoral election was held on 27 November 2024 as part of nationwide local elections to elect the mayor of Tasikmalaya, West Java for a five-year term. The previous election was held in 2017. The election was won by the Gerindra Party's Viman Alfarizi Ramadhan, a member of the West Java Regional House of Representatives, who received 48% of the vote. City Secretary Ivan Dicksan Hasanudin of the Prosperous Justice Party (PKS) placed second with 20%.

== Electoral system ==
The election, like other local elections in 2024, follow the first-past-the-post system where the candidate with the most votes wins the election, even if they do not win a majority. It is possible for a candidate to run uncontested, in which case the candidate is still required to win a majority of votes "against" an "empty box" option. Should the candidate fail to do so, the election will be repeated on a later date.

== Candidates ==
According to electoral regulations, in order to qualify for the election, candidates were required to secure support from a political party or a coalition of parties controlling 9 seats (20 percent of all seats) in the Tasikmalaya City Regional House of Representatives (DPRD). The Great Indonesia Movement Party, with 10 seats in the DPRD, is the only party eligible to nominate a mayoral candidate without forming a coalition with other parties. Candidates may alternatively demonstrate support to run as an independent in form of photocopies of identity cards, which in Tasikmalaya's case corresponds to 40,375 copies. Murjani, a former Gerindra member serving in the Tasikmalaya City DPRD, registered as an independent candidate, but failed to submit sufficient proofs of support to run in the election.

=== Potential ===
The following are individuals who have either been publicly mentioned as a potential candidate by a political party in the DPRD, publicly declared their candidacy with press coverage, or considered as a potential candidate by media outlets:

- Muhammad Yusuf (Golkar), previous mayor.
- Uu Ruzhanul Ulum (PPP), former vice governor of West Java.
- Dicky Candra, former vice regent of Garut, actor.
- Viman Alfarizi Ramadhan (Gerindra), member of the West Java Regional House of Representatives.
- Yadi Mulyadi (PKS), former member of Tasikmalaya City DPRD, chairman of PKS' Tasikmalaya City branch.
- Ivan Dicksan, city secretary of Tasikmalaya.

== Political map ==
Following the 2024 Indonesian legislative election, ten political parties are represented in the Tasikmalaya DPRD:

Political parties	Seat count
Great Indonesia Movement Party (Gerindra)	10 / 45
United Development Party (PPP)	7 / 45
Party of Functional Groups (Golkar)	5 / 45
National Awakening Party (PKB)	5 / 45
Prosperous Justice Party (PKS)	5 / 45
Indonesian Democratic Party of Struggle (PDI-P)	4 / 45
National Mandate Party (PAN)	4 / 45
Democratic Party (Demokrat)	3 / 45
NasDem Party	1 / 45
Crescent Star Party (PBB)	1 / 45

== Results ==
Candidate	Running mate	Party	Votes	%
Viman Alfarizi Ramadhan	Dicky Candra	Gerindra Party	193,225	48.34
Ivan Dicksan Hasanudin	Dede Muhammad Muharam	Prosperous Justice Party	83,046	20.78
Nurhayati Effendi	Muslim	United Development Party	63,875	15.98
Yanto Irianto	Aminudin Bustomi	National Awakening Party	40,201	10.06
Muhammad Yusuf	Hendro Nugraha	Golkar	19,377	4.85
Total			399,724	100.00
Valid votes			399,724	95.54
Invalid/blank votes			18,644	4.46
Total votes			418,368	100.00
Registered voters/turnout			543,990	76.91
Source: KPU
