= List of incumbent regional heads and deputy regional heads in West Java =

The following is an article about the list of Regional Heads and Deputy Regional Heads in 27 regencies/cities in West Java who are currently still serving.

== List ==
Regency/ City	Photo of the Regent/ Mayor	Regent/ Mayor	Photo of Deputy Regent/ Mayor	Deputy Regent/ Mayor	Taking Office	End of Office (Planned)	Ref.
Bandung; Regency List of Regents/Deputy Regents		Dadang Supriatna		Ali Syakieb	20 February 2025	20 February 2030	
West Bandung; Regency List of Regents/Deputy Regents		Jeje Ritchie Ismail		Asep Ismail	20 February 2025	20 February 2030	
Bekasi; Regency List of Regents/Deputy Regents		Asep Surya Atmaja (Acting Officer)			20 December 2025	20 February 2030	
Bogor; Regency List of Regents/Deputy Regents		Rudy Susmanto		Ade Ruhandi	20 February 2025	20 February 2030	
Ciamis; Regency List of Regents/Deputy Regents		Herdiat Sunarya	Vacant (The deputy regent passed away)		20 February 2025	20 February 2030	
Cianjur; Regency List of Regents/Deputy Regents		Mohammad Wahyu Ferdian		Ramzi Geys Thebe	20 February 2025	20 February 2030	
Cirebon; Regency List of Regents/Deputy Regents		Imron Rosyadi		Agus Kurniawan Budiman	20 February 2025	20 February 2030	
Garut; Regency List of Regents/Deputy Regents		Abdusy Syakur Amin		Luthfianisa Putri Karlina	20 February 2025	20 February 2030	
Indramayu; Regency List of Regents/Deputy Regents		Lucky Hakim		Syaefudin	20 February 2025	20 February 2030	
Karawang; Regency List of Regents/Deputy Regents	pus	Aep Syaepuloh		Maslani	20 February 2025	20 February 2030	
Kuningan; Regency List of Regents/Deputy Regents		Dian Rachmat Yanuar		Tuti Andriani	20 February 2025	20 February 2030	
Majalengka; Regency List of Regents/Deputy Regents		Eman Suherman		Dena Muhamad Ramdhan	20 February 2025	20 February 2030	
Pangandaran; Regency List of Regents/Deputy Regents		Citra Pitriyami		Ino Darsono	20 February 2025	20 February 2030	
Purwakarta; Regency List of Regents/Deputy Regents		Saepul Bahri Binzein		Abang Ijo Hapidin	20 February 2025	20 February 2030	
Subang; Regency List of Regents/Deputy Regents		Reynaldi Putra		Agus Masykur Rosyadi	20 February 2025	20 February 2030	
Sukabumi; Regency List of Regents/Deputy Regents		Asep Japar		Andreas	20 February 2025	20 February 2030	
Sumedang; Regency List of Regents/Deputy Regents		Dony Ahmad Munir		Fajar Aldila	20 February 2025	20 February 2030	
Tasikmalaya; Regency List of Regents/Deputy Regents		Cecep Nurul Yakin		Asep Sopari Al Ayubi	4 June 2025	4 June 2030	
Bandung; City List of Mayors/Deputy mayors		Muhammad Farhan		Erwin	20 February 2025	20 February 2030	
Banjar; City List of Mayors/Deputy mayors		Sudarsono		Supriana	20 February 2025	20 February 2030	
Bekasi; City List of Mayors/Deputy mayors		Tri Adhianto Tjahyono		Abdul Harris Bobihoe	20 February 2025	20 February 2030	
Bogor; City List of Mayors/Deputy mayors		Dedie Abdu Rachim		Jenal Mutaqin	20 February 2025	20 February 2030	
Cimahi; City List of Mayors/Deputy mayors		Ngatiyana		Adhitia Yudisthira	20 February 2025	20 February 2030	
Cirebon; City List of Mayors/Deputy mayors		Effendi Edo		Siti Farida Rosmawati	20 February 2025	20 February 2030	
Depok; City List of Mayors/Deputy mayors		Supian Suri		Chandra Rahmansyah	20 February 2025	20 February 2030	
Sukabumi; City List of Mayors/Deputy mayors		Ayep Zaki		Bobby Maulana	20 February 2025	20 February 2030	
Tasikmalaya; City List of Mayors/Deputy mayors		Viman Alfarizi Ramadhan		Raden Dicky Candranegara	20 February 2025	20 February 2030	

Notes

- "Commencement of office" is the inauguration date at the beginning or during the current term of office. For acting regents/mayors, it is the date of appointment or extension as acting regent/mayor.
- Based on the Constitutional Court decision Number 27/PUU-XXII/2024, the Governor and Deputy Governor, Regent and Deputy Regent, and Mayor and Deputy Mayor elected in 2020 shall serve until the inauguration of the Governor and Deputy Governor, Regent and Deputy Regent, and Mayor and Deputy Mayor elected in the 2024 national simultaneous elections as long as the term of office does not exceed 5 (five) years.

== See also ==
- West Java
