= Viman Alfarizi Ramadhan =

Indonesian politician (born 1987)

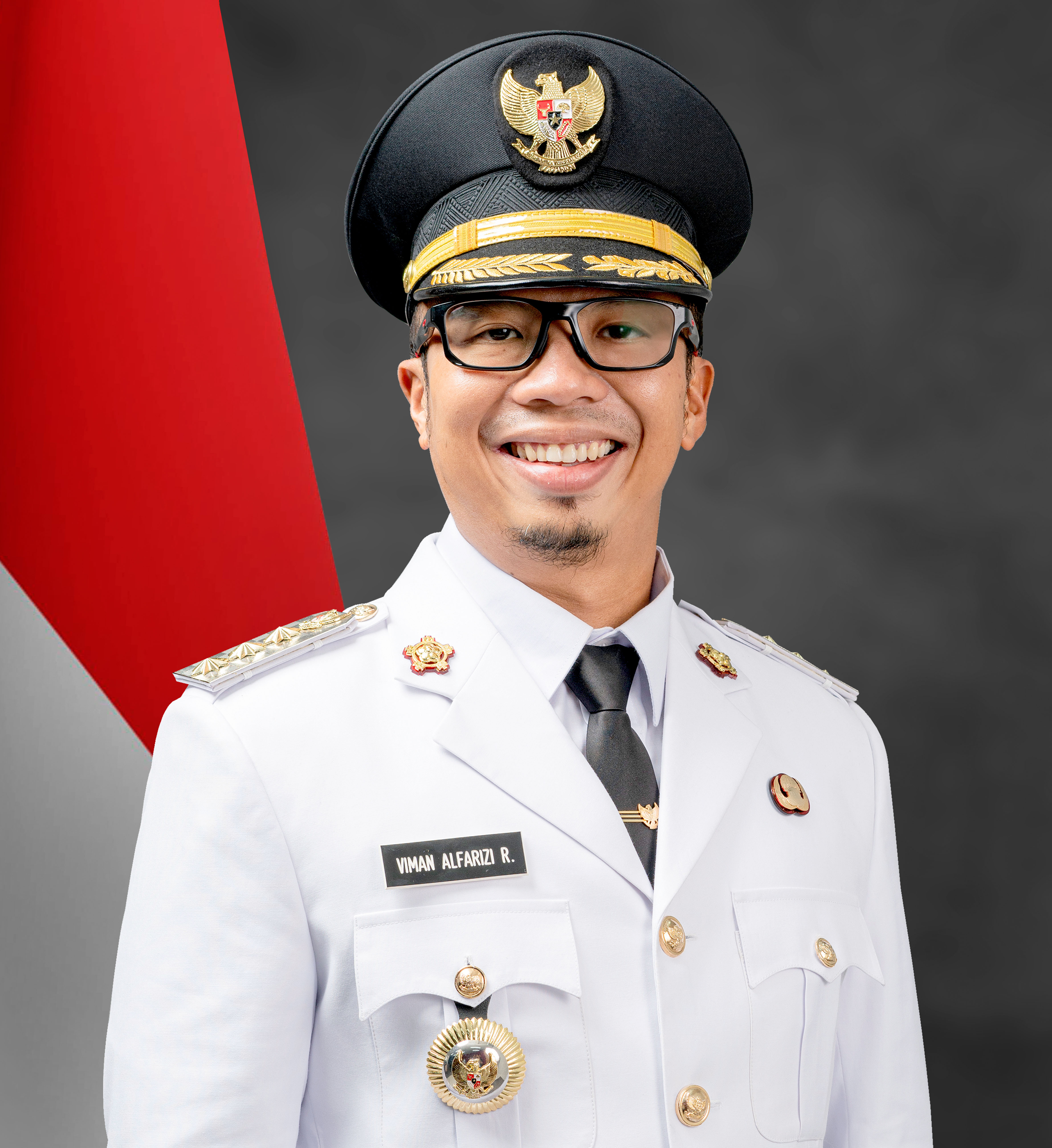

Mayor of Tasikmalaya
- Incumbent
- Assumed office 20 February 2025
- Preceded by: Muhammad Yusuf

Member of the West Java Regional House of Representatives
- In office 2019–2024

Personal details
- Born: 14 May 1987 Tasikmalaya, Central Java, Indonesia
- Party: Gerindra
- Education: Telkom Institute of Technology; Gadjah Mada University

Viman Alfarizi Ramadhan (born 14 May 1987) is an Indonesian politician and businessman who is serving as the incumbent mayor of Tasikmalaya since 2025. A member of the Gerindra Party, he previously served as a member of the West Java Regional House of Representatives from 2019 until 2024.

== Early life and career ==
Viman Alfarizi Ramadhan was born in Tasikmalaya on 14 May 1987. His father, Arief Rahman Hakim Mahpud, is the son of Engkud Mahpud, the founder and owner of the Mayasari Bakti bus company. Meanwhile, his mother, Evi Silviani, is a member of the Tasikmalaya Regional House of Representatives for the 2024–2029 period from the Gerindra Party. Meanwhile, Viman is also the nephew of Amir Mahfud, the owner of the Primajasa bus company and the chairman of Gerindra's West Java branch. He attended and graduated from both the Telkom Institute of Technology (now Telkom University) and Gajah Mada University.

== Political career ==
=== Legislator (2019–2024) ===
In the 2019 elections, Viman was elected a member of the West Java Regional House of Representatives. He represented the electoral district of West Java 15—containing the city of Tasikmalaya and Tasikmalaya Regency—as a member of Gerindra. During his time as a legislator, Viman sat on Commission 5 which discusses the field of people's welfare.

=== Mayor of Tasikmalaya (since 2025) ===
In 2024, local elections were held across Indonesia, including a mayoral election in Tasikmalaya. Viman announced his mayoral candidacy through a video on his personal Instagram account. He was supported by Gerindra and the NasDem Party. Raden Dicky Candranegara, better known as Dicky Chandra, became his running mate. The pair were elected with 193,225 votes. They were confirmed as mayor and vice-mayor by the General Elections Commission on 9 January 2025. He was sworn-in as mayor on 20 February 2025 by President Prabowo Subianto at the Merdeka Palace.

== Personal life ==
He is married to Elvira Kammarov Putri, who works as a doctor. They live in elite housing complex in Tasikmalaya owned by his extended family, namely the Grand Mayasari Estate.
