= Telkom Purwokerto Institute of Technology =

Coordinates: 7°26′06″S 109°15′03″E

Telkom University Purwokerto
- Universitas Telkom Kampus Purwokerto
- Motto: Bridging Technology For Humanity
- Type: Private University
- Established: December 20, 2002
- Rector: Prof. Drs. Agus Irianto, M.Sc., P.hd. (2015–present)
- Address: Office "Jln. DI Panjaitan 128; 53147 – Purwokerto", Purwokerto, Indonesia
- Affiliations: Telkom University, Akademi Telkom Jakarta
- Website: ittelkom-pwt.ac.id

Telkom Purwokerto Institute of Technology (Indonesian: Institut Teknologi Telkom Purwokerto, ITTP) is a private university located in Purwokerto, Central Java, Indonesia. The institute started in 2002, and was formerly known as Akademi Telekomunikasi Sandhy Putra Telkom, and Telkom Telematics Technology College (ST3 Telkom) Purwokerto. IT Telkom Purwokerto is financed and operated by the Telkom Foundation.

IT Telkom Purwokerto is the first institute that focuses on science, technology and engineering in Purwokerto, Central Java.

It partners with various universities in Korea, Cambodia, China, etc. IT Telkom Purwokerto has 13 study programs.

== Facilities ==
1. WIFI
2. Library
3. Journal
4. Computer Application Laboratory
5. Computer Networking Laboratory
6. Electrical Laboratory
7. Switching Laboratory
8. Sport Field Test
