= Telkom Institute of Technology Jakarta =

Private University in Jakarta

- Motto: Innovation For The Future (English)
- Type: Private
- Established: 2021
- Rector: Dr. Ir. Agus Achmad Suhendra, M.T.
- Location: West Jakarta, DKI Jakarta, Indonesia; 6.155251°S 106.750681°E
- Campus: Sub urban
- Nickname: ITTelkom Jakarta
- Website: ittelkom-jkt.ac.id

Telkom Institute of Technology Jakarta, (Indonesian: Institut Teknologi Telkom Jakarta; abbreviated as ITTelkom Jakarta), is a private university located in Indonesia. This institute was formerly known as Akademi Teknik Telekomunikasi Sandhy Putra Jakarta which was established in 2002. ITTelkom Jakarta is managed by Telkom Foundation (Indonesian: Yayasan Pendidikan Telkom; abbreviated as YPT) and affiliated with other Telkom campuses in several major cities of Indonesia.

== History ==
ITTelkom Jakarta was formerly known as Sandhy Putra Jakarta Telecommunication Engineering Academy, which was established on May 13, 2002. Its famous name, which was often used for marketing purposes, is Jakarta Telkom Academy. ITTelkom Jakarta was established on June 2, 2021, by the Decree of Minister of Higher Education (Kemdikbudristek) of the Republic of Indonesia number 232/E/O/2021 with three new study programs of S1 (Bachelor's degree) in Telecommunication Engineering, Information Technology and Information Systems. These new study programs are an addition to the Diploma degree of Telecommunication Engineering study program that has been established since 2002.

On August 21, 2021, a Grand Launching of ITTelkom Jakarta was lively held in a hybrid method of event while still implementing health protocol of COVID-19.

=== Rektor ===
- Dr. Ir. Agus Achmad Suhendra, M.T. (2021-2025)

== Academic ==
ITTelkom Jakarta organizes 4 study programs under 1 faculty, namely the Faculty of Engineering. The 4 study programs are Telecommunications Engineering (Bachelor's and Diploma degree), Information Technology and Information Systems. These study programs are designed to have characteristics which focus on the applications of Technology, Information and Communication (ICT) in the fields of Creative Industry, Digital Economy and Entrepreneurship (abbreviated as CDE).

=== Laboratory ===
In supporting the teaching and learning activities in ITTelkom Jakarta, campus facilities are provided from lectures infrastructure to the green campus atmosphere. The 3:1 comparison of land use and building area of campus A in ITTelkom Jakarta enables campus to implement a green campus concept and environmental conservation initiation. The campus facilities and infrastructure consist of 8 lecture halls, 1 shared office for lecturers and staff, 12 laboratories, library, public as well as student facilities. Laboratories in ITTelkom Jakarta are as follows:

- Electrical Laboratory
- Electronics Laboratory
- Digital Communication System Laboratory
- Microcontroller Laboratory
- Wireless Laboratory
- Antenna Laboratory
- Fiber Optic Laboratory
- FTTH Laboratory
- CCNA Laboratory
- Multimedia Laboratory

As for the Campus B of ITTelkom Jakarta is supported by infrastructures, such as:

- Lecturers and TPA Administration Rooms
- Information Systems Laboratory
- Information Technology Laboratory
- Visual Communication Design Laboratory
- Informatics Laboratory
- Lecture Halls
- Library
- Student Room
- Student Center
- Canteen

== Campus ==
Campus A

- Campus A of ITTelkom Jakarta is located at Daan Mogot street KM. 11 Cengkareng District, West Jakarta. Postal code 11710.

Campus B

- Campus B of ITTelkom Jakarta is located at is at Halimun Raya road No. 2 Setiabudi District, South Jakarta.

== Conferences ==
As a part of implementing The Tri Dharma of Higher Education, ITTelkom Jakarta (through its department of research and community service, namely PPM) continuously strives to support the collaboration of its lecturers in research and community service activities. Since 2019, PPM successfully held CENTIS (Conference on Telematics and Information Society) for 3 consecutive years. With a reference to the vision of the institution to become an international standard campus, the implementation of CENTIS in 2022 and years afterwards is expected to improve its level into an International Conference.

== Student Affairs ==
In order to further engage students in non-academic activities with the purpose of making achievements, supervisory and preparation conducted in ITTelkom Jakarta student organizations is in line with the agenda of the Pusat Prestasi Nasional (Puspresnas) under the Ministry of Education, Culture, Research and Technology (Kemdikbudristek). To support this program, it is mandatory for ITTelkom Jakarta students to participate in various student activities which later be recorded in a Transcript of Student Activities (TAK). Areas of student activities include:

- SPIRITUAL:
  - IMMA
  - ROHKRIS
- CULTURAL ARTS:
  - MUSIC
  - HADROH & MARAWIS
  - FIFO
- SCIENTIFIC:
  - Innovation (SONIC)
  - ALC (Language Club)
- SPORT:
  - Basket
  - Futsal
  - Taekwondo
  - Badminton
  - Table Tennis
  - E-Sport
