= Mayor of Cirebon =

- Wali Kota Cirebon
- Coat of arms of Cirebon

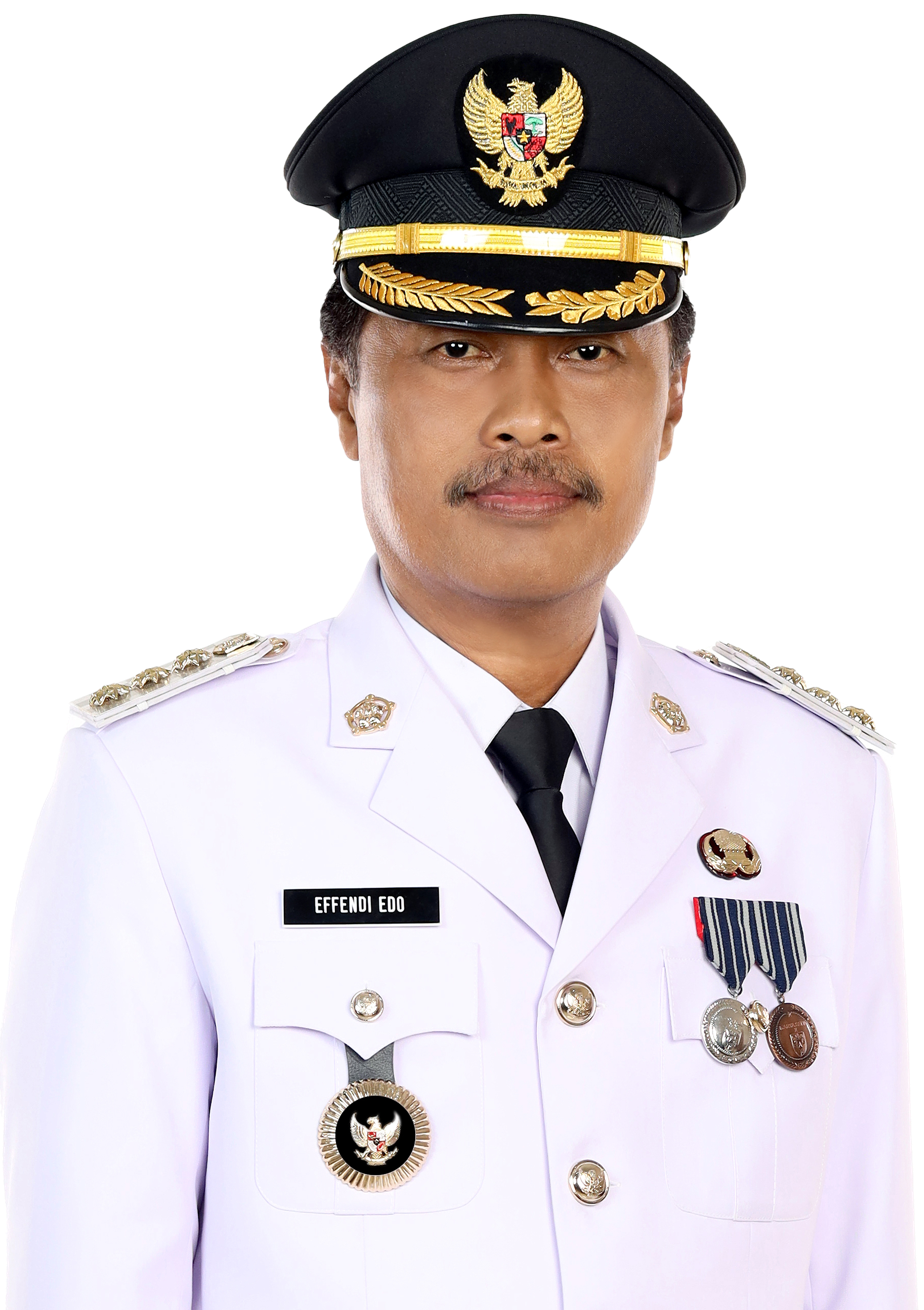
- Incumbent; Effendi Edo since 20 February 2025
- Term length: 5 years
- Inaugural holder: Y. H. Johan
- Formation: 1920
- Website: Official website

Mayor of Cirebon is the head of the second-level region who holds the government in Cirebon together with the Vice Mayor and 35 members of the Cirebon City Regional House of Representatives. The mayor and vice mayor of Cirebon are elected through general elections held every 5 years. The first mayor of Cirebon was Y. H. Johan, who governed the city period from 1920 to 1925.

== List ==
The following is a list of the names of the Mayors of Cirebon from time to time.

Dutch East Indies Period
Num.	Portrait	Mayor	Beginning of office	End of Term	Political Party / Faction	Period	Note.	Vice mayor
1		Y. H. Johan	1920	1925	Independent	1	(Note: Burgemeester Cheribon)	N/A
2		Roelof Adriaan Sc. Hotman	1925	1928	Independent	2		N/A
3		Jan Marie van Gostrom Slede	1928	1933	Independent	3		N/A
4		H. E. C. Kontic	1933	1938	Independent	4		N/A
5		H. S. C. Hupen	1938	1942	Independent	5		N/A
Japanese Occupation Period
Num.	Portrait	Mayor	Beginning of office	End of Term	Political Party / Faction	Period	Note.	Vice mayor
1		Asikin Nataatmaja	1942	1943	Independent	6	(Note: Shito Cirebon)	N/A
2		Moeniran Soerianegara	1943	1949	Independent	7		N/A
Mayor of Cirebon
Num.	Portrait	Mayor	Beginning of office	End of Term	Political Party / Faction	Period	Note.	Vice mayor
1		Prinata Koesoema	1949	1950	Independent	8		N/A
2		Moestafa Soerjadi	1950	1954	Independent	9		N/A
3		Hardian Karta Atmaja	1954	1957	Independent	10	(Note: Changed name to Mayor)	N/A
4		Prawira Amijaya	1957	1959	Independent	11		N/A
5		Moh. Safei	1959	1960	Independent	12		N/A
6		R.S.A. Prabowo	1960	1965	Independent	13		N/A
7		R. Sukardi	1965	1966	Independent	14		N/A
8		Tatang Suwardi	1966	1974	Independent	15		N/A
9		H. Aboeng Koesman	1974	1981	Independent	16		N/A
10		Drs. H. Achmad Endang	1981	1983	Independent	17		N/A
11		Drs. Moh. Dasawarsa	1983	1988	Independent	18		N/A
12		Drs. H. Kumaedhi Syafrudin	1988	1993	Independent	19		N/A
12		Drs. H. Kumaedhi Syafrudin	1993	1998	Independent	20		N/A
13		Drs. H. Lasmana Suriaatmadja	1998	2003	Independent	21		N/A
14		Subardi; S.Pd.	2003	2008	PDI-P	22		Agus Alwafier
14		Subardi; S.Pd.	16 April 2008	16 April 2013	PDI-P	23 (2008)		Sunaryo H. W. (2008–2012)
15		Drs. H. Ano Sutrisno; M.M.	16 April 2013	19 February 2015	Golkar	24 (2013)	(Note: Died in office.)	Nasrudin Azis
16		Drs. H. Nashrudin Azis; S.H.	26 March 2015	15 February 2018	Demokrat	24 (2013)		–
16		Drs. H. Nashrudin Azis; S.H.	12 December 2018	6 November 2023	Demokrat	25 (2018)		Eti Herawati
17		Dra. Hj. Eti Herawati; M.AP.	6 December 2023	12 December 2023	Nasdem Party	25 (2018)		N/A
18		Effendi Edo; S.Ap., M.Si.	20 February 2025	Incumbent	Golkar	26 (2024)		Siti Farida Rosmawati

== Temporary replacement ==
In the government stack, a regional head who submits himself to leave or temporarily resigns from his position to the central government, then the Minister of Home Affairs prepares a replacement who is a bureaucrat in the regional government or even a vice mayor, including when the mayor's position is in a transition period.

Portrait	Mayor	Party	Beginning	End	Duration	Period	Definitive	Ref.
	Nashrudin Azis (Acting Officer)	Demokrat	19 February 2015	25 March 2015	34 days	24 (2013)	Nashrudin Azis	
	Dr. H. Dedi Taufik Kurohman; M.Si. (Temporary Acting)	Independent	15 February 2018	15 April 2018	59 days	24 (2013)	Transition (2018)	(Note: Incumbent Mayor Nashrudin Azis is on campaign leave for the 2018 Cirebon mayoral election from 15 February 2018 to 23 June 2018, the position of interim mayor is held by Temporary Acting Dedi Taufik Kurohman.)
	Dr. H. Dedi Taufik Kurohman; M.Si. (Acting)	Independent	16 April 2018	12 December 2018	240 days	–	Transition (2018)	
	Dra. Hj. Eti Herawati; M.AP. (Acting Officer)	NasDem	6 November 2023	6 December 2023	30 days	25 (2018)	Eti Herawati	(Note: Incumbent Mayor Nashrudin Azis resigned to participate in the 2024 Indonesian legislative elections contest.)
	Dr. Drs. H. Agus Mulyadi; M.Si. (Acting)	Independent	13 December 2023	20 February 2025	1 year, 69 days	–	Transition (2023–2025)	

== See also ==
- Cirebon
- List of incumbent regional heads and deputy regional heads in West Java
