= Nurhayati Effendi =

Indonesian entrepreneur and politician

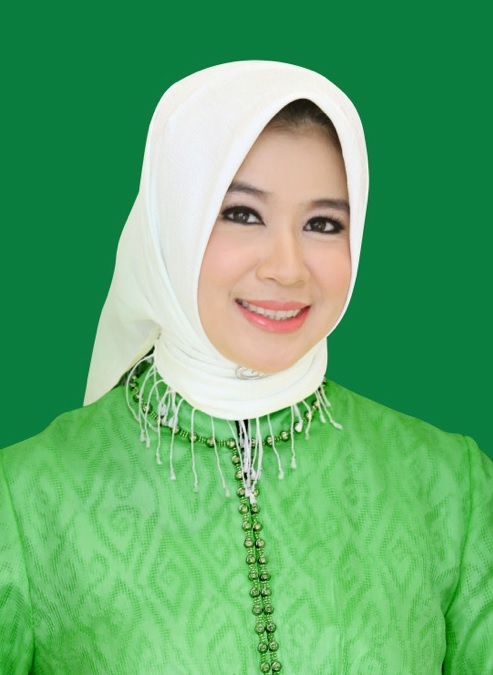
- Nurhayati in 2014

Member of People's Representative Council
- In office 1 October 2014 – 1 October 2024
- Constituency: West Java XI

Personal details
- Born: Nurhayati Effendi; 20 November 1969 (age 56) Tasikmalaya, West Java, Indonesia
- Party: United Development Party
- Spouse: Suharso Monoarfa (m. 2011)
- Occupation: Entrepreneur and politician

Nurhayati Effendi (born 20 November 1969) is an Indonesian politician who became a member of the 2019–2024 House of Representatives (DPR) of Republic of Indonesia (RI). She is presently a member of the Special Committee (Pansus) of the Capital of the State (IKN) of the archipelago, having joined the DPR RI.

== Education ==
After completing her early schooling at SMP XII South Jakarta from 1982 to 1985, SMA Negeri 47 Jakarta from 1985 to 1988, and SD Sukarasa III Bandung from 1976 to 1982, Nurhayati enrolled in the Jakarta InterStudi Public Relations Academy in 1993.

== Career ==
=== Early career ===
She began her career with Asuransi Alian from 1994 to 1995; Director of PT. Kahuripan Adijaya from 1996 to 2009; President Director of PT. Cahaya hidup from 2000 to 2013; and President Commissioner of PT. Tirtayasa Satria Mandiri since 2010. In addition to participating actively in business associations, Nurhayati joined the Chamber of Industrial Trade (KADIN) in 2009 and established a dialogue partner relationship with South Korea.

=== Political career ===
==== 2014–2019 term ====
In 2009, Nurhayati entered the political sphere as a United Development Party (PPP) cadre. Subsequently, Nurhayati became a member of the Women's Development Association (WPP) women's wing organization in 2011 and held the position of chairman for the Environment and Health Division. Since 1 October 2014, she has been an Indonesian politician representing Tasikmalaya, Tasikmalaya Regency, and Garut Regency in the West Java XI electoral area of the DPR RI. Suharso Monoarfa was the general chairman of the PPP, which is led by politician Nurhayati Effendi.

Nurhayati's primary focus during her first term (2014–2019) is Commission V, which oversees transportation and infrastructure. She conducted a number of work visits, concentrating on the Bachelor of Science in Pharmaceutical Sciences (BSPS) students, irrigation, and bridge construction within the framework of the region's infrastructure and transportation evaluation.

==== 2019–2024 term ====
As the Head of Commission V, or the Deputy Chairman of Commission V in 2019–2020, Nurhayati remains in Commission V DPR RI. Building residential areas, national work programs, and traffic and road regulations are its primary concerns. Furthermore, in 2020–2021 she sat in Commission II in charge of Domestic Government and Regional Autonomy; State Apparatus and Bureaucratic Reform; Elections; Land and Agrarian Reform. Additionally in 2021, she was in Commission IX DPR-RI, overseeing population, employment, and health, and collaborating with the Ministry of Manpower, the Ministry of Health, and more.

Nurhayati thought that the Indonesian Marriage law needed to be strengthened. She claimed that for men to be unable to delight women, laws must be improved or revised. She thus said it in response to incidences of domestic abuse or to Mega Suryani Dewi's (24), personal experience with domestic abuse in Bekasi Regency. Mega was the victim of domestic abuse from her husband, Nando, 24, which led to her death.

Nurhayati emphasized the value of communication to workers on 24 November 2023, who want to stage a nationwide walkout in response to the UMP 2024 decision in certain provinces not meeting expectations. She inquired as to whether the Ministry of Manpower might assist in bringing together employees and business owners to discuss potential solutions that would result in a win-win outcome. She acknowledges that the necessities and cost of living vary by location. She informed the staff to enhance their work performance and money management skills in line with that.

She did not qualify for a third term in the 2024 election as her party failed to pass the 4% electoral threshold.

== Political positions ==
=== Mental health ===
On 8 November 2023, Nurhayati requested that the government take mental health issues more seriously by making therapy more accessible. According to her, the Public Health Centers located in Indonesia's major cities can be used as a platform for the government to begin training and staffing more psychologists. She also hopes that the government will establish a hotline for mental health issues, where people may voice their concerns and receive remote consultations via phone or live chat.

=== Gender equity ===
Nurhayati asserts that women today play a very big and important role in society, particularly in the political sphere. She does, however, assert that there are still a lot of barriers and difficulties that women in politics must overcome, including prejudice based on gender, discrimination, and restricted access to opportunities and resources. Thus, more work is required to guarantee that women may participate in politics on an equal footing with men and that their achievements can be adequately acknowledged and compensated. She made some recommendations for actions to ensure that women's roles and contributions be larger and taken into consideration in the future.

=== Israeli–Palestinian conflict ===
Nurhayati is in favour of the boycott of Israeli goods movement, which was presently supported by the Indonesian Ulema Council's (MUI) fatwa. She said that the boycott of Israeli goods movement was thought to be powerful enough to halt the genocide occurring in Gaza, Palestine. "I support the boycott of goods made in Israel. Since this opposition does not require the sacrifice of life, it is quite successful in making them aware of the economic significance that they have thus far received from Muslims and humans," stated Nurhayati on 14 November 2023. She declared that she was in favour of boycotting Israeli goods to protect Palestinian security concerns. Nurhayati underlined that human rights need to be upheld everywhere in the world. In an effort to hasten the conclusion of the ongoing conflict between Israel and Palestine, Nurhayati Effendi requested the people to pray for peace.

== Personal life ==
On 20 November 1969, Nurhayati was born in Tasikmalaya. Since 2011, she is the spouse of Suharso Monoarfa, the Minister of National Development Planning and Head of the National Development Planning Agency. Together the couple have three children.

The divorce filed by Nurhayati was case number 568/PDt G/PA.JS. On 31 January 2022, the letter was formally filed to the South Jakarta Religious Court. The divorce trial between the Suharso and Nurhayati has entered its third meeting, according to the PR for South Jakarta PA. Nurhayati confirmed the divorce case after a while. She also hopes that things may be maintained and get back to normal in her household.

== Awards ==
Nurhayati was honoured on 19 July 2023, as a Regional Care Figure at the Tero Binocular Parliament Award, or TPA 2023. She was regarded as having demonstrated exceptional dedication in performing her responsibilities and roles as a member of the DPR RI from West Java XI.
