= Telkom University =

Private university in Bandung, Indonesia

- Universitas Telkom
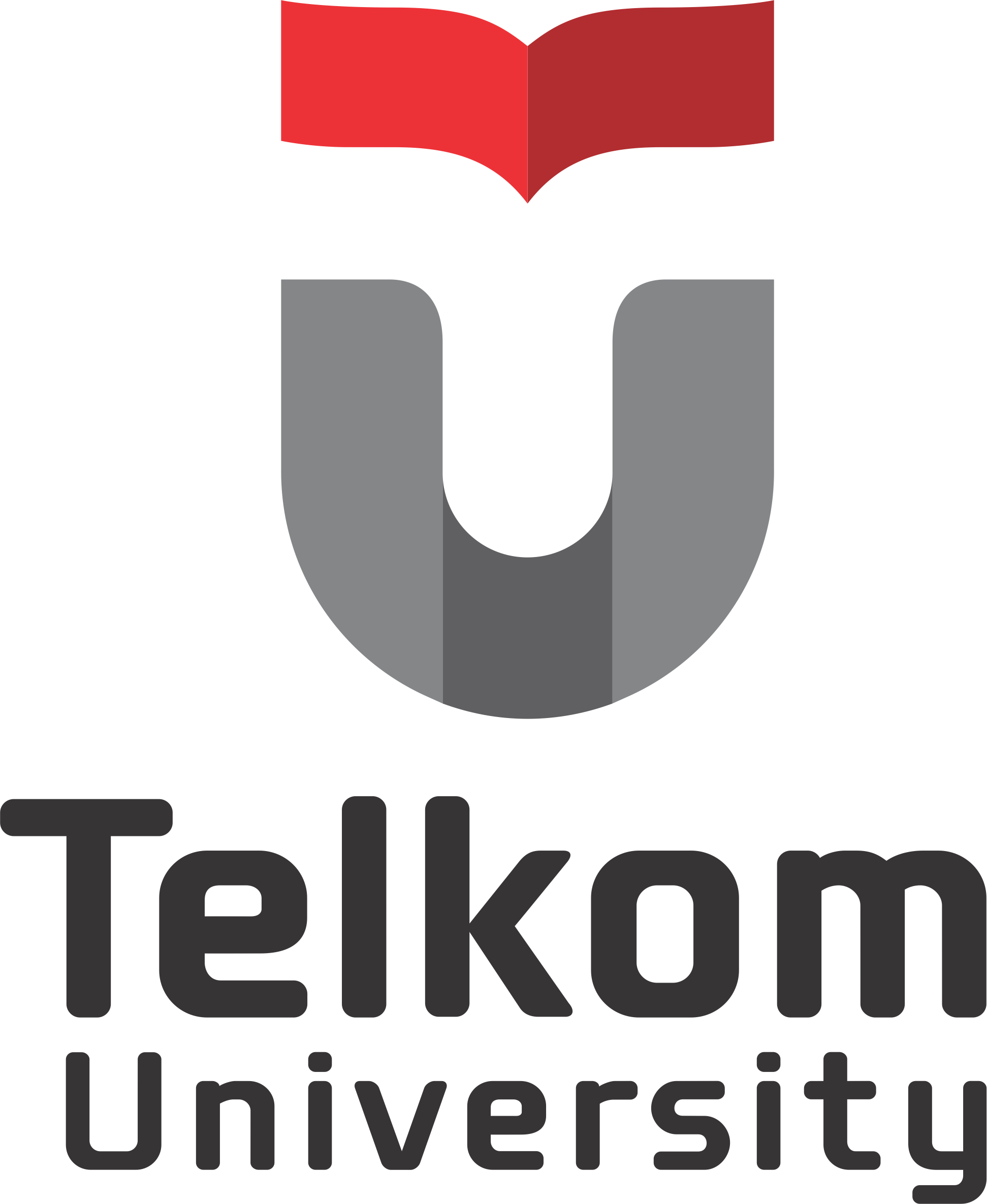
- Statuta Tel-U
- Other name: Tel-U
- Motto: Partum in Futuro
- Motto in English: Creating the Future
- Motto in Indonesian: Menciptakan Masa Depan
- Type: Private
- Established: August 14, 2013; 13 years ago
- Founder: Ir. Cacuk Sudarijanto
- Parent institution: Telkom Indonesia; Telkom Foundation
- Accreditation: BAN-PT: Excellent; ASIC; ABEST21; IABEE
- Affiliations: APERTI BUMN
- Rector: Prof. Dr. Suyanto, S.T, M.Sc.
- Academic staff: 1.033
- Students: 34.675
- Location: Telekomunikasi Street, Terusan Buahbatu, Sukapura, Dayeuhkolot, Bandung Regency, West Java, Indonesia; 6°58′23.81977″S 107°37′49.21716″E
- Campus: 48 hectares (120 acres); Sub urban
- Colors: Maroon
- Website: telkomuniversity.ac.id

Telkom University (Indonesian: Universitas Telkom, abbreviated as Tel-U) is a private university located in Bandung. Established in 2013, the university was formed through the merger of several higher-education institutions operated by the Telkom Foundation. Telkom University has received institutional accreditation classified as “Excellent” by the National Accreditation Board for Higher Education (BAN-PT).

Established on August 14, 2013, with four institutions that were under Telkom Indonesia through its education-focused wing, Telkom Education Foundation (now Telkom Foundation), were merged to form the university. These four forming institutions were the Telkom Institute of Technology (Institut Teknologi Telkom), Telkom Institute of Management (Institut Manajemen Telkom), Telkom Polytechnic (Politeknik Telkom) and the Telkom College of Art and Design Indonesia (Sekolah Tinggi Seni Rupa dan Desain Indonesia Telkom). The university, like its preceding institutions, maintains links with hundreds of companies, many of which are in the telecommunications sector.

== History ==
=== Establishment of STT Telkom and MBA Bandung ===
Indonesia's largest state-owned company in telecommunication, Telkom Indonesia was then led by Chief Director Ir. Cacuk Sudarijanto founded the Telkom College of Technology (STT Telkom) and the MBA Bandung in 1990. These are the first universities in Indonesia that specialize in education in the telecommunications and information technology industries. STT Telkom unveiled its foundation on Friday, September 28, 1990, in London Downstream Gegerkalong by the Minister of Tourism, Post and Telecommunications at the time, Susilo Sudarman. STT Telkom has been under the Telkom Education Foundation (YPT) since its establishment.

The purpose of the rapid establishment of STT Telkom is to meet the needs of experts in the telecommunications industry. Telkom is very interested in the institution, so it provides full scholarships to students for the 1991 and 1992 classes. The existence of climate change in the telecommunications industry and with the start of Telkom Indonesia entered the era of going public, the scholarship program and bulk bond subsequently terminated and STT Telkom became an independent college.

At the beginning stands, the STT Telkom campus is spread over three locations, Campus-1 in Jalan Soekarno Hatta, Campus-2 in Jalan Hilir Gegerkalong and Campus-3 in Jalan Haji Hasan Mustafa Penhollow. MBA first-Bandung is Building H and I Telkom Training Center Complex located at 47 Lower Street Gegerkalong Bandung. In 1993, STT Telkom has its campus on Canal Street Buahbatu Telecommunications called Bandung Technoplex area and a year later all teaching and learning activities centered on the new campus. Bandung Technoplex area was inaugurated by the President of the Republic of Indonesia Suharto on March 24, 1994. In the past, the area was the location of the second oldest radio transmitter station in Indonesia belonging to the Dutch Colonial Government, which later participated in broadcasting the news of the Proclamation of Independence of the Unitary State of the Republic of Indonesia on August 17, 1945, to various parts of the world.

At the beginning of its establishment, the MBA Bandung fully adopted the Asian Institute of Management (AIM) Philippines schooling system. In 1994, MBA Bandung changed to the College of Management Bandung (STMB). Responding to government regulations regarding the management of the implementation of the MBA program in Indonesia, in the same year, MBA-Bandung changed its organizational form into a High School by the name London School of Management and changed the program into a Master of Management program. In 1997 STMB organized Bachelor programs. The study program that was opened at STMB at that time was the Bachelor of Business Management in Telecommunication and Informatics (MBTI).

In 2004 STMB changed to the College of Business Management Telkom (Telkom STMB). STT Telkom improve its organizational form into Telkom on November 20, 2007 and changed its name to Telkom Institute of Technology (Institut Teknologi Telkom or IT Telkom) in 2008.

=== Establishment of Telkom Polytechnic and STISI Telkom ===
On September 27, 2007, Telkom Polytechnic was inaugurated by the President Director of Telkom Indonesia, Rinaldi Firmansyah. Telkom Polytechnic's course of history stems from two training programs engaged in the field of ICT, namely STT Telkom Professional Program and NIIT & Telkom Center. Both training institutions are then merged to form a new higher education institution engaged in the field of vocational education.

In 2008, Telkom transformed STMB Telkom into the Telkom Institute of Management (IM Telkom). Transformation is characterized by the increase in courses organized by IM Telkom.

In February 2010, the School of Indonesian Art and Design (STISI) that one of the pioneer universities in the field of art and design in Indonesia joined Telkom Education Foundation and changed its name to Telkom Indonesia College of Art and Design (STISI Telkom). STISI was established on 2 September 1990, by Usnadibrata and Dedeh Usnadibrata under the Mandiri Indonesia Education Foundation (Yayasan Pendidikan Mandiri Indonesia).

=== Telkom University mergered ===
Since 2009, there has been a plan to merge the four universities under the Telkom Education Foundation (Yayasan Pendidikan Telkom), namely the Telkom Institute of Technology, the Telkom Institute of Management, Telkom Polytechnic and the Telkom Indonesia College of Art and Design. It was initially planned that the four institutions would be merged into one university in 2012. But due to several problems the merge was delayed to 2013.

On August 14, 2013, Telkom University was established based on the Decree of the Director General of Higher Education of the Ministry of Education and Culture Number 309/E/0/2013. On August 31, 2013, Telkom University was inaugurated by the Minister of Cultural Education of the Republic of Indonesia, Muhammad Nuh, at the Telkom University Convention Hall, by presenting the first Chancellor of Telkom University, Mochamad Ashari, who is a Professor of Electrical Engineering at the Sepuluh Nopember Institute of Technology, Surabaya.

In merging into Telkom's University in 2013, Each of the four schools formed a faculty inside the university. IT Telkom was transformed into the Telkom Engineering School (TES). Subsequently, in 2014 TES developed into three faculties, namely the School of Electrical Engineering (SEE), the School of Industrial Engineering (SIE) and the School of Computing (SC). IM Telkom transformed into the Telkom Economics and Business School (TEBS). Subsequently, in 2014, TEBS developed into two faculties, namely the School of Economics and Business (SEB)and the School of Communications and Business. Telkom Polytechnic transformed into the Telkom Applied Science School (TASS). Subsequently, in 2014 was changed to the School of Applied Science (SAS). STISI Telkom was transformed into a Faculty that was named Telkom Creative Industries School (TCIS). Subsequently, in 2014 was changed to the School of Creative Industries (SCI).

The Telkom University campus is located in the Bandung Technoplex area. The campus is a development of the STT Telkom campus. Telkom University has the abbreviation Tel-U and the motto of "Creating the Future" which was initiated by Arief Yahya, President Director of Telkom Indonesia when Telkom University was established.

In 2023, Telkom University launched the Telkom University National Campus (TUNC) program, an initiative aimed at expanding Telkom University’s educational reach across various cities in Indonesia to enhance the quality of education. This year, two new branch campuses were established: Telkom University Jakarta (TUJ) and Telkom University Surabaya (TUS), resulting from the merger of Institut Teknologi Telkom Jakarta and Institut Teknologi Telkom Surabaya.

Building on the Telkom University National Campus (TUNC) initiative, Telkom University has continued its expansion in 2024 by establishing an additional branch campus, Telkom University Purwokerto (TUP), which originated from Institut Teknologi Telkom Purwokerto.

== Academics and administration ==
=== Rector ===
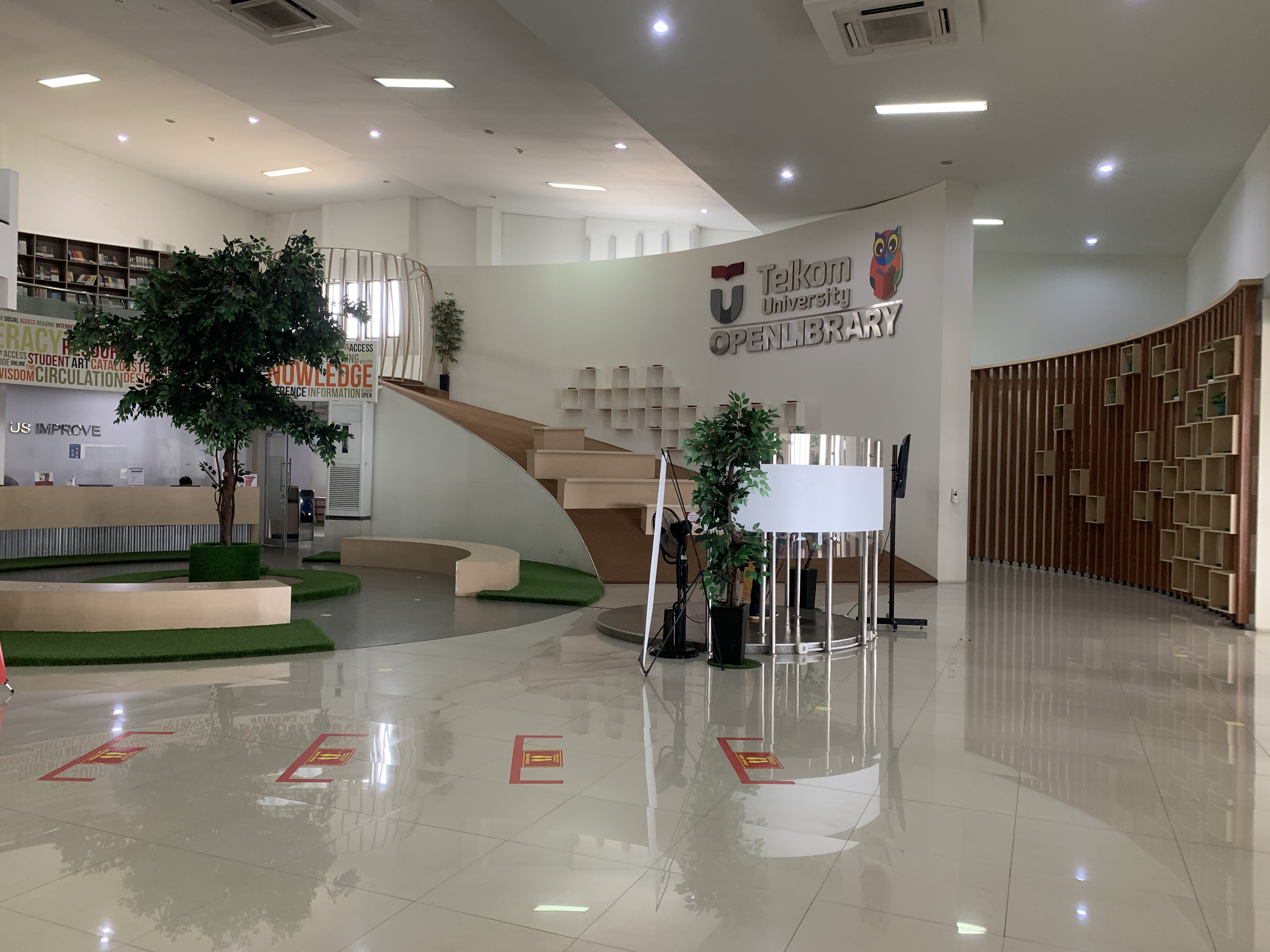
Telkom University provides Open Library, a digital library that provides information on all of Telkom's library collections.

The highest formal leader of Telkom University is a Rector, currently Suyanto. The rector carries out his duties and is responsible to the chairman of the foundation. List of rectors who have served:

- Prof. Ir. Mochamad Ashari, M.Eng., Ph.D. (2013–2018)
- Prof. Dr. Adiwijaya, S. Si., M.Si (2018–2023)

== Accreditations and rankings ==
=== University rankings ===
Telkom University has several times been ranked as the best private university in Indonesia and one of the best universities in Indonesia. In Young university rankings, Telkom University is Ranked 3rd in the Times Higher Education Young University Rankings 2024. The following is the ranking of Telkom University in the last eighth years:

==== Global rankings ====
Ranking	2022	2023	2024	2025	2026	Ref.
QS World University Rankings	1001-1200 (#10; *2)	1001-1200 (#11; *2)	1001-1200 (#11; *2)	1001-1200 (#11; *2)	1001-1200 (#12; *2)	
THE: World University Ranking	1201+ (#14)(*2)	1501+ (#24)(*3)	1501+ (#24)(*3)	1501+ (#15)(*3)	1501+ (#19)(*5)	
"#" shows the ranking among Indonesian Universities "*" shows the ranking among Indonesian Private Universities

==== Regional rankings ====
Ranking	2022	2023	2024	2025	2026	Ref.
QS Asia University Rankings	401-450 (#12; *2)	351-400 (#11; *2)	301-350 (#11; *2)	282 (#13; *2)	257 (#13; *2)	
THE: Asia University Ranking	401-450 (#12)(*2)	351-400 (#11)(*2)	301-350 (#11)(*2)	601+ (#14)(*3)	601-800 (#12)(*2)	
"#" shows the ranking among Indonesian Universities "*" shows the ranking among Indonesian Private Universities

=== Subject Rankings and Accreditations ===
QS World University by Subject 2025
Subject	Global	National
Computer Science and Information Systems	▼701-750	▲7

THE World University Rankings by Subject 2026
Subject	Global	National
Business and Economics Studies	801-1001	▲9
Computer Science	801-1000	▲5
Engineering	1000-1250	▲5
Social Science	801-1000	▼10
