= Telkom Institute of Management =

University in Indonesia

- Institut Manajemen Telkom
- Motto: Integrity, Entrepreneurship, and Best for Excellence
- Type: Private university
- Established: 1990
- Rector: Ir. Husni Amani, M.Sc., M.BA
- Location: Bandung, Indonesia
- Website: www.imtelkom.ac.id

Institut Manajemen Telkom English: Telkom Institute of Management (IM Telkom, formerly known as Sekolah Tinggi Manajemen Bisnis Telkom or STMB Telkom) was founded with the name Master in Business Administration (MBA) in Bandung, as the Graduate School.

At the beginning of its establishment, the Institute of Telkom Management fully adopted the Asian Institute of Management (AIM) Philippines schooling system. MBA Bandung is the organizer of the first MBA program in West Java.

== Administration ==
The organization and management of institutions were supervised by three professionals from AIM: one dean (Dean Bernado), one senior professor (Rafael J. Azanza), and one director (Emmy De Vera). The three introduced and implemented the AIM schooling system from 1990 to 1995. They came to IM Telkom to teach a team-teaching approach with the internal faculty and discuss the better management of educational institutions.

The application of schooling system at Telkom IM was successful - with the IPPM, IPMI, and Prasetya Mulya, it was listed as the four best business schools of the SWA in 1992, ahead of the public universities like UI, ITB, etc.

== Learning system ==
The program produces graduates who take part in management in the infocom industry sectors. IM Telkom apply link and match patterns, which are embodied in:

- The curriculum is tailored to the needs of the business world/infocom industry
- Internships at companies
- Partnership program (Co-op)
