= Muhammad Yusuf (Indonesian politician) =

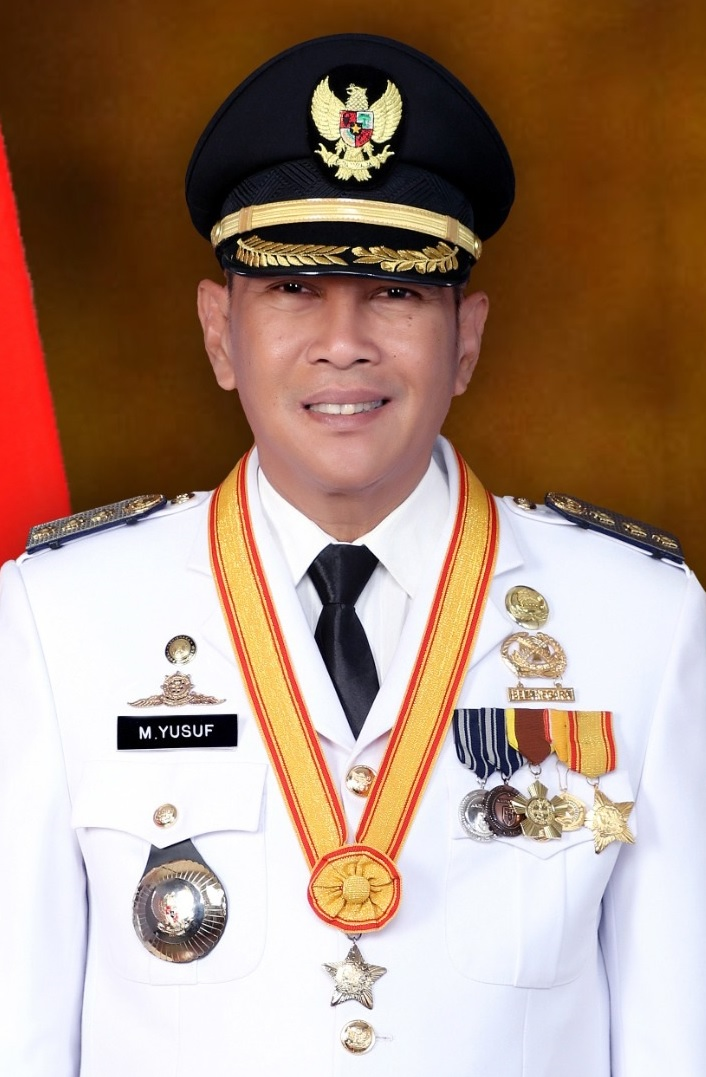
- Official portrait

Mayor of Tasikmalaya
- In office 10 September 2021 – 14 November 2022; Acting: 23 October 2020 – 10 September 2021
- Preceded by: Daniel Budiman
- Succeeded by: Cheka Virgowansyah (act.)

Vice Mayor of Tasikmalaya
- In office 14 November 2017 – 23 October 2020
- Mayor: Budi Budiman

Personal details
- Born: 6 June 1956 (age 69) Tasikmalaya, West Java, Indonesia
- Party: Golkar

Muhammad Yusuf (born 6 June 1956) is an Indonesian politician of the Golkar party and former civil servant who served as the mayor of Tasikmalaya, West Java from 2020 to 2022. Before becoming mayor, he was the city's vice mayor starting in 2017 when the mayor Daniel "Budi" Budiman was arrested for corruption.

== Early life ==
Muhammad Yusuf was born on 6 June 1956 in Tasikmalaya city, spending his childhood at the foot of Mount Galunggung. After completing elementary school in the city in 1969, his family moved to Ambon, Maluku where he went to middle school. In 1972, they moved again to Yogyakarta and Yusuf graduated from high school there in 1975. He continued his education in Yogyakarta for some time, before later receiving a degree in government administration from an institution in Garut.

== Career ==
After completing school, he began to work as a civil servant for the municipal government of Tasikmalaya Regency. Notably, he was promoted to become head of finance in the regency's secretariat in 2007. In 2011, he was promoted to become head of the regency's revenue and asset management service, and he held onto the position until his retirement in 2016. After his retirement from the civil service, Yusuf joined Golkar and ran in the 2017 mayoral election for Tasikmalaya City as the running mate of Budi Budiman. The pair, supported by Golkar, Nasdem, PPP, and PKB, won the three-way election with 151,931 votes (40.06%). Budiman and Yusuf were sworn in as mayor and vice mayor on 14 November 2017.

On 23 October 2020, Budiman was arrested by the Corruption Eradication Commission under corruption charges, and thus Yusuf became acting mayor to replace him. Yusuf was sworn in as Tasikmalaya's definitive mayor on 10 September 2021. His tenure ended on 14 November 2022, and he was replaced by Cheka Virgowansyah in an acting capacity. He has declared that he intends to run in the 2024 mayoral election.

== Family ==
In 1982, he married Rukmini Affandi, daughter of painter Affandi.
