= Daniel Budiman =

German television presenter

Daniel Ridwan Budiman
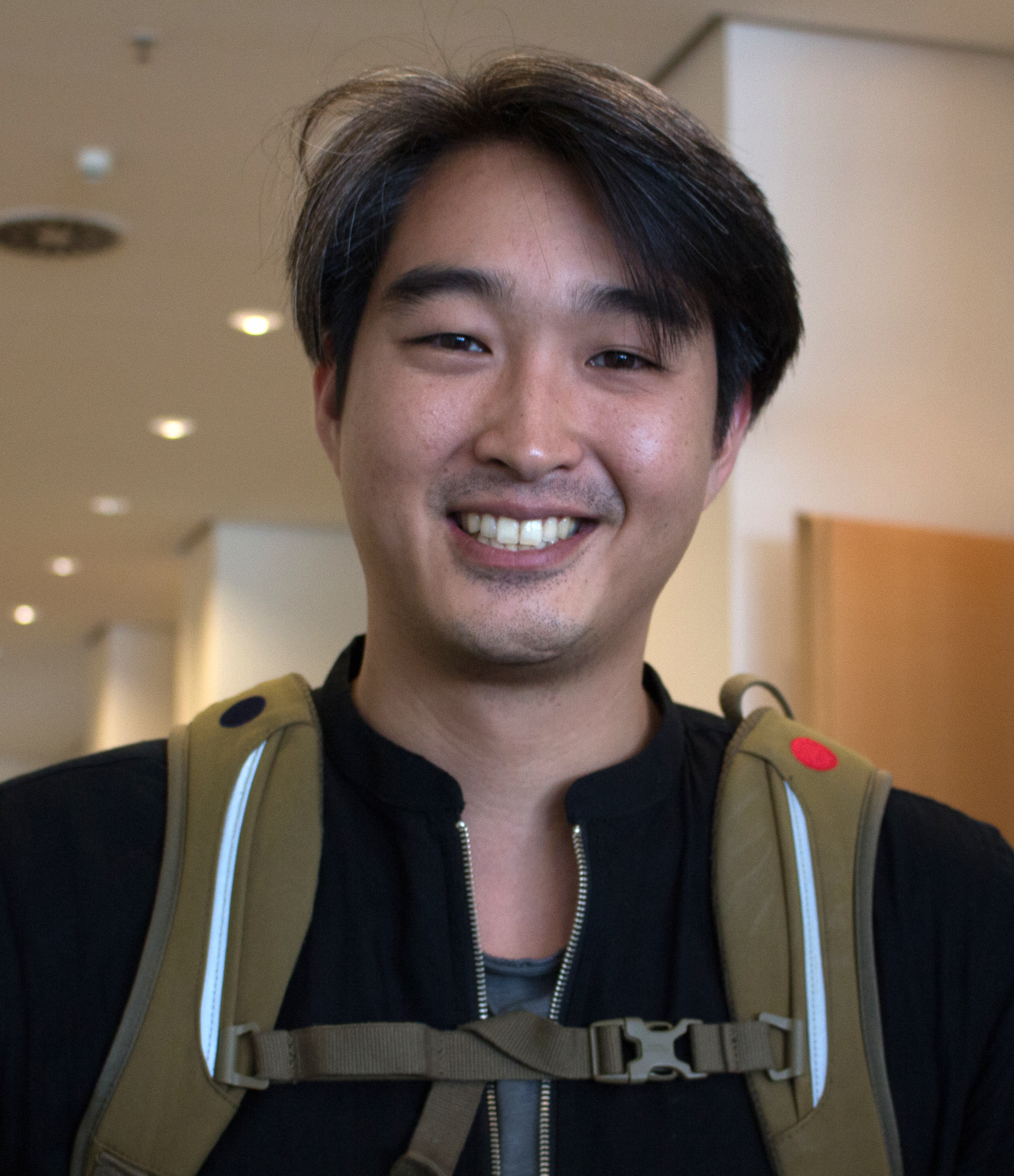
- Born: May 23, 1983 (age 42); Flensburg, West Germany
- Occupation: Television presenter

Daniel Ridwan "Budi" Budiman (born May 25, 1983, in Flensburg) is a German presenter. He was a presenter at GIGA from 2003 to 2006 and then developed the computer game show Game One together with Simon Krätschmer, where he hosted and produced from 2006 to 2014. He is co-founder and presenter of the media production company Rocket Beans Entertainment GmbH, founded in 2011, of which he was co-managing director until 2014.

== Life ==
Budiman was born as the third child of an Indonesian family. He has one sister and one brother.

He attended the German International School in Jakarta and the Immanuel Kant High School in Bad Oeynhausen, where he graduated from high school. In the high school, he was active as a student representative and in the school choir.

Parallel to his hosting of Game One, Budiman studied philosophy for two semesters at the University of Hamburg.
