= Communication and Information Technology Regulatory Authority (Kuwait) =

Coordinates: 24°44′56″N 46°41′18″E

Kuwait Communication and Information Technology Regulatory Authority (Kuwait) (CITRA)
- الهيئة العامة للاتصالات وتقنية المعلومات

Agency overview
- Jurisdiction: Government of Kuwait
- Headquarters: Kuwait
- Agency executives: Governor; Dr. Khaled Mohammad Abdullah Al-Zamel, Chairman
- Website: http://www.citra.gov.kw

Communication and Information Technology Regulatory Authority (CITRA) (Arabic: الهيئة العامة للاتصالات وتقنية المعلومات, it is an independent governmental entity in Kuwait

Established by a decision of the Council of Ministers Law No. 37 of 2014 regulating the establishment of the Communication and Information Technology Regulatory Authority.

Citra is responsible for overseeing the telecommunications sector, monitor and protect the interests of users and service providers and regulate the services of telecommunication networks in the country, while ensuring transparency, equality of opportunity and fair competition.

== Tasks and Authorized Powers ==
- Protecting consumer affairs
- Regulating services, tariffs, and rates within the ICT sector.
- Encouraging competition and investment in the ICT sector and preventing unfair competition.
- Regulating and licensing telecommunications services.

== ICT subsectors ==
- Telecommunications Sector
- Operators and Fair Competition Sector
- Information Technology (IT) Sector
- Administrative and Financial Affairs Sector
