= Telkom Institute of Technology =

University in Indonesia

- Institut Teknologi Telkom
- Motto: Center of Excellence
- Type: Private university
- Active: 1990–2013, following a merger with Telkom Institute of Management, Telkom Politechnics, and Telkom Creative Arts School to form Telkom University
- Rector: Ahmad Tri Hanuranto, Ir., MT
- Location: Bandung, Indonesia; 6°58′23.81977″S 107°37′49.21716″E
- Website: www.ittelkom.ac.id

Institut Teknologi Telkom (English: Telkom Institute of Technology, abbreviated as IT Telkom) was an Indonesian vocational university specializing in telecommunication engineering. It was established on September 28, 1990 as Sekolah Tinggi Teknologi Telkom (Telkom Higher School of Technology, STT Telkom) by the Telkom Education Foundation, which is owned by PT Telkom, the semi-privatized government-owned telecommunication company of Indonesia. The school with 480.000 m² area was in Dayeuhkolot, 3 km south of Bandung. In August 2013, the institution was merged with the foundation's 3 other institutions (Telkom Institute of Management, Telkom Politechnics, and Telkom Creative Arts Schools) to form Telkom University.

IT Telkom focused on a program to support the development of telecommunication technologies and industries by providing skilled professionals. In its early years of 1991 and 1992, PT Telkom provided scholarship to all students with job contracts at the company after graduation.

In 2005, IT Telkom tied with China's largest telecommunication manufacturer and wireless provider, ZTE, to establish a telecommunication center at the school's campus.

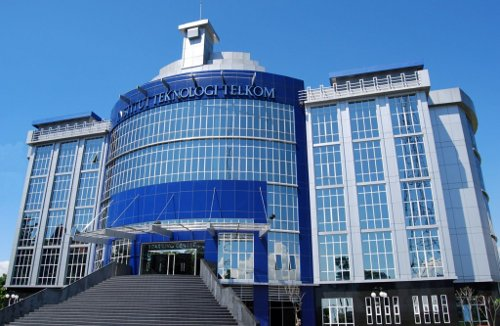
Main building of Telkom Institute of Technology in 2009

== Faculties ==
1. Faculty of Electrical Engineering and Communications
2. Faculty of Informatics Engineering
3. Faculty of Industrial Engineering
4. Faculty of Science
5. Faculty of Postgraduate
