= Telkom Foundation =

Indonesian education organization

- Location: Indonesia

Telkom Foundation is an educational organisation in Indonesia formed through the merger of the Telkom Education Foundation (YPT) and the Sandhykara Putra Telkom Foundation (YSPT) in 2013. YPT has been around since 1990, while YSPT was established in 1980.

== History ==
=== Telkom Education Foundation ===
MBA Bandung was established in 1989, followed by Telkom Education Foundation (YPT) and STT Telkom in 1990. MBA Bandung became STMB (Sekolah Tinggi Management Bandung) in 1993. Telkom received a grant for K-lite Radio and 1996 and construction of the STMB campus began in 2000. In 2003, YPT procured Zora Radio, and CDC and NTC (NIIT Telkom Centre) were both established. NIIT Telkom Center (NTC) was established as a training program in collaboration with the National Institute of Information Technology (NIIT) to provide information technology education and professional training. The Cacuk Sudaryanto Building was built in 2005. Telkom Polytechnic & Transformation's name changed from Academy to Institute (i.e., Telkom Institute of Technology, Telkom Institute of Management) in 2007. The lab, learning center, and other learning facilities were built in 2008; the following year, the IM Telkom Campus became Integrated Campus. YPT acquired STISI (Sekolah Tinggi Seni Rupa dan Desain Indonesia) in 2010, changing its name to STISI Telkom. YPT earned the ISO 9001-2008 Certification for Lecture Development, Research, and Education as preparation toward World Class University in 2011; this was valid through 2014.

=== Sandhykara Putra Telkom Foundation ===
The Sandhykara Putra Telkom Foundation (YPST) was officially founded in 1980; the same year, Pancar Atmaja Junior High School became the Periska Postel Junior High School. In 1981, Periska Postel Schools were renamed Sandhy Putra; YSPT's board was formed; and the Sandhy Putra Cibeureum Kindergarten was established. In 1983, the Sandhy Putra Singaraja Kindergarten was established and the Periska Postel Junior High School was renamed the Sandhy Putra Junior High School. Sandhy Putra schools established over the next 20 years included: Jambi Kindergarten (1984), Magelang Kindergarten (1985), Medan, Bogor, Pasuruan, and Ende Kindergarten (1986), Pekanbaru, Palembang I, Palembang II Kindergarten (1987), Pamatang Siantar, Bandar Lampung, and Solo Kindergarten (1988), Gorontalo & Sumbawa (1991), Makassar Tourism Vocational School (1991), Tanjung Pinang Makassar Kindergarten (1993), Tourism Academy Bandung (1994), Benhkulu, Balikpapan Kindergarten (1995), Baturaja Kindergarten (1996), Jayapura Kindergarten (1998), Banjarbaru Vocational School (1998), Banjarbaru Vocational School (1999), Tarakan Play Group (2001), Batam Elementary School (2002), and Batam Kindergarten (2003). At the same time, Telkom Sandhy Putra schools were also being established: Medan Vocational School (1992), Jakarta Academy (2006), and Purwokerto Academy (2006). This was also true for Telkom schools: Jakarta Vocational School (1992), Medan Tourism Vocational School (1992), Bandung Vocational School (1992), Malang Vocational School (1999), and the Purwekerto Vocational School (2000).

=== Telkom Foundation ===
YPT and YPST merged in 2013 to become the Telkom Foundation. In 2014, primary and middle level education was changed, and Telkom University's faculties increased from four to seven.

Introducing the One Pipe Education System (OPES) for primary & secondary level of educations, Telkom Foundation currently manages 44 schools. The schools manages certain levels of schools, including Kindergarten, Elementary, Junior, Senior high, and Vocational School. Telkom Foundation also manages four higher education Institutions, Telkom University, Telkom College of Telematics Technology (ST4), Sandhy Putra Tourism Academy Bandung & Telkom Academy Jakarta. Moreover, Telkom Foundation also manages Telkom Professional Development Center (Telkom PDC), a training center dedicated in developing Indonesian Human Resource Competences.

Recognizing the significant financial resources required to enhance education quality and to achieve World Class University standards by 2017, the Telkom Foundation established several alternative funding sources. To date, the foundation has developed four holding companies: PT Edu Jasa Utama (including PT Mega Utama Rekanindo, PT Mitra Karya Soludindo Utama, and PT Trengginas Jaya), PT. Jaringan Solusi Utama (PT. Sandhy Putra Makmur), PT Citra Sukapura Megah, and PT. Edu Medika Komunika (PT. Radio Lintas Kontinental, PT. Radio Karang Tumaritis, PT. Tuvendo Jaya Utama, PT. Mekka, PT. Publika Edu Media), as well as Telkom Professional Certification Center, and Bandung Techno Park.

In 2017, the Telkom Foundation projected its business units to achieve a target revenue of IDR 4 trillion, aiming to cover 80% of the foundation’s operational costs as part of its commitment to providing affordable, high-quality education for everyone.
