= Tasikmalaya =

City in West Java, Indonesia

- City
- City of Tasikmalaya; Kota Tasikmalaya

Other transcription(s)
  - Sundanese: ᮓᮚᮩᮂ ᮒᮞᮤᮊ᮪ᮙᮜᮚ
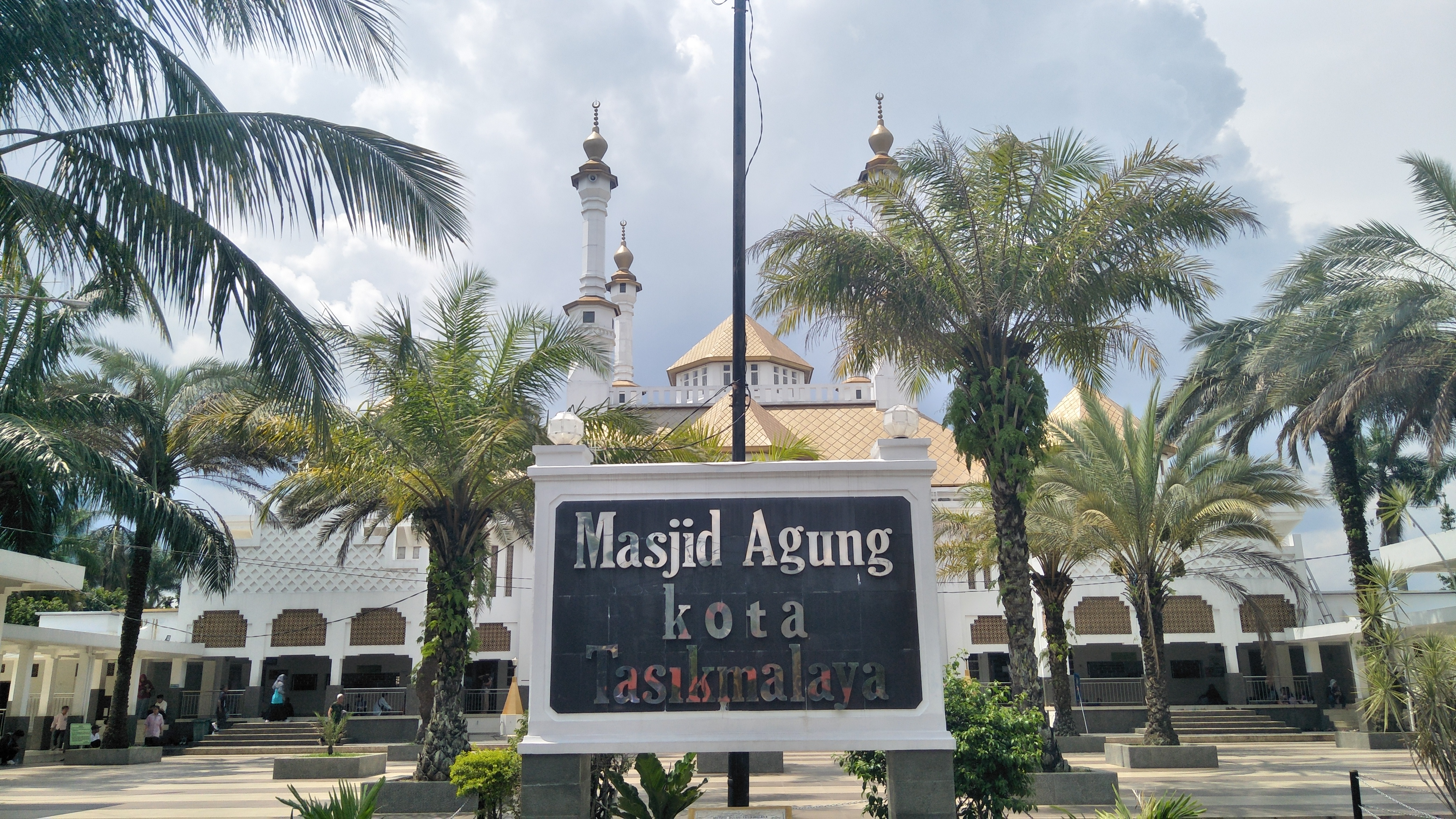
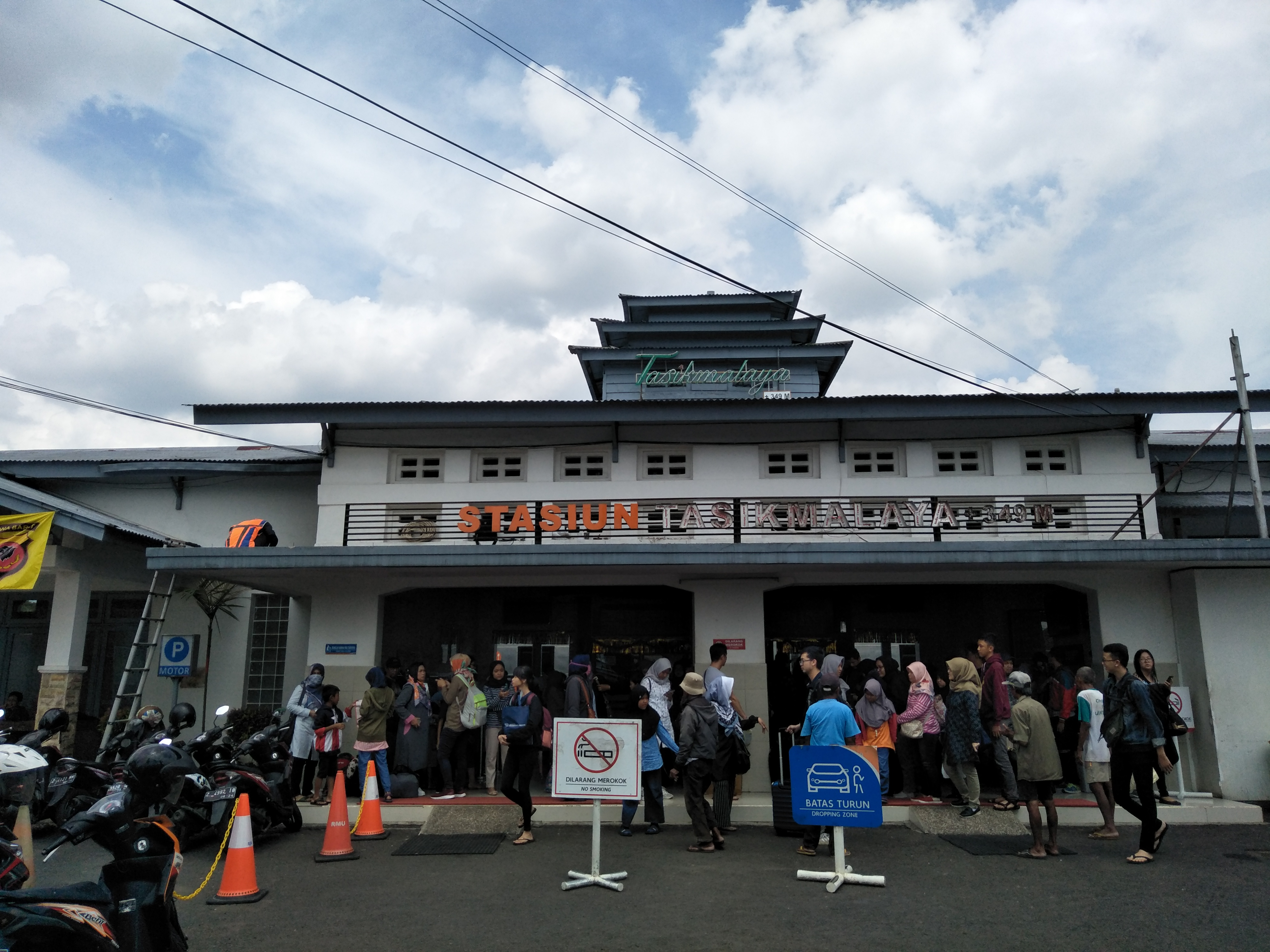
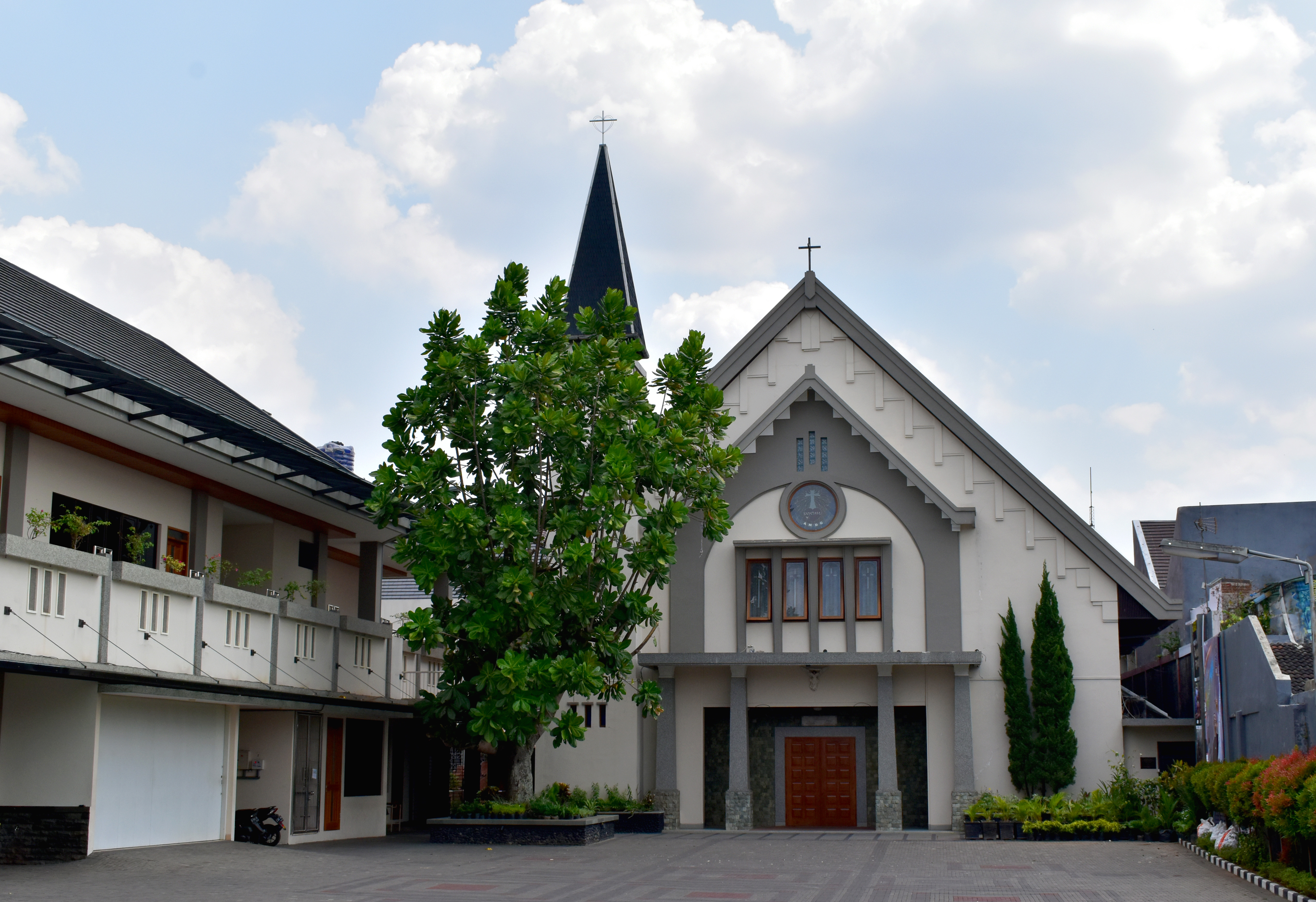
- Clockwise from top: Great Mosque of Tasikmalaya, Sacred Heart of Jesus church, Tasikmalaya railway station

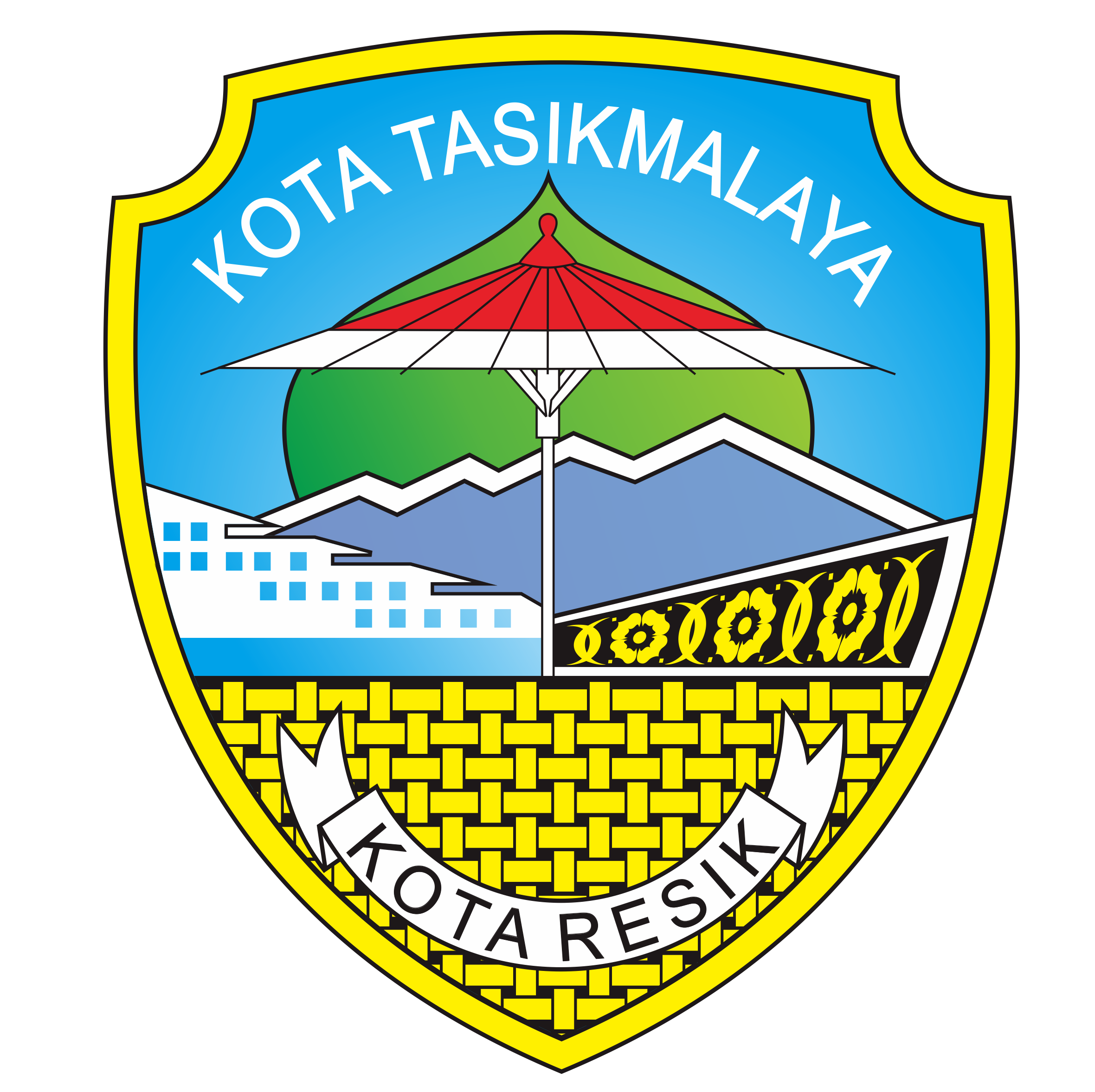
- Flag Coat of arms
- Nickname: Delhi Van Java (Dutch) (Delhi of Java)
- Motto: Kota Resik (Neaty City)
- Location within West Java

- Location in Java and Indonesia Tasikmalaya City (Indonesia)
- Coordinates: 7°18′58″S 108°11′51″E
- Country: Indonesia
- Province: West Java
- Founded: 2001

Government
  - Mayor: Viman Alfarizi Ramadhan
  - Vice Mayor: Dicky Chandra

Area
  - City: 183.14 km^{2} (70.71 sq mi)
  - Metro: 729.4 km^{2} (281.6 sq mi)
- Elevation: 340 m (1,120 ft)

Population (mid 2024 estimate)
  - City: 770,839
  - Density: 4,209.0/km^{2} (10,901/sq mi)
  - Metro: 1,339,891
  - Metro density: 1,837/km^{2} (4,758/sq mi)
- Time zone: UTC+7 (Indonesia Western Time)
- Area code: (+62) 265
- Vehicle registration: Z
- Website: tasikmalayakota.go.id

Tasikmalaya (also known as Tasik) is a landlocked city in West Java, Indonesia. The city is sometimes dubbed kota santri (city of religious learners) or "the City of a Thousand Pesantrens" for its abundance of Islamic boarding schools. Located around 120 kilometres (75 mi) southeast from the provincial capital of Bandung, Tasikmalaya is passed by Indonesian National Route 3.

The city is located in the mountainous East Parahyangan region of Java at an elevation of 351 metres (1,151 feet).

The population of the city (excluding the Tasikmalaya Regency, which surrounds the city to the west, south and east) was 634,948 according to the 2010 census, and increased to 716,155 at the 2020 census; the official estimate as of mid 2024 was 770,839 (comprising 391,746 males and 379,093 females). Its built-up (or metro) area (made of Tasikmalaya City and 14 neighbouring districts spread over Tasikmalaya and Ciamis Regencies) was home to 1,214,000 inhabitants as at mid 2023. Tasikmalaya is the largest city in West Java outside of Jakarta and Bandung metropolitan area.

== Demographics ==
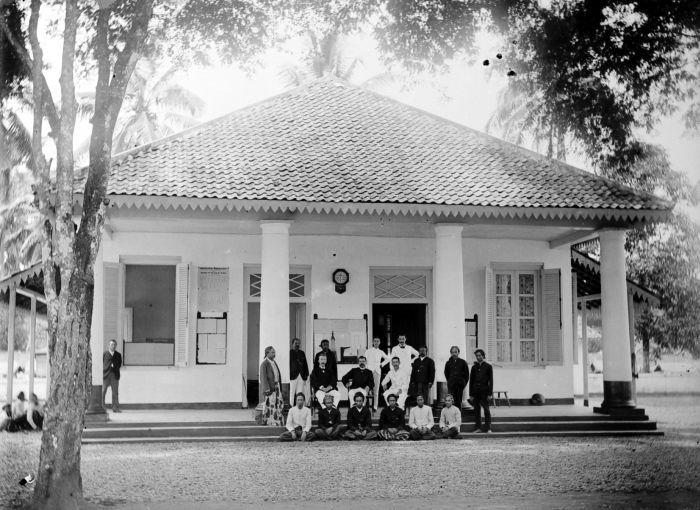
Assistant Resident office in Tasikmalaya (1900-1921).

The population of the city of Tasikmalaya according to the intermediate censuses in the years 2005 and 2015, and the full censuses in 2010 and 2020, are listed below, together with the most recent official estimate for mid 2024:

Year	Population	Density per km^{2}
2005	579,671	3,147
2010	634,948	3,447
2015	657,477	3,569
2020	716,155	3,887
2024	770,839	4,209

== Administrative districts ==
Tasikmalaya city is divided into ten districts (kecamatan), listed below with their areas and their populations at the 2010 census and the 2020 census, together with the official estimates as at mid 2024. The table also includes the number of administrative villages (all classed as urban kelurahan) in each district, and its post code.

Kode Wilayah	Name of District (kecamatan)	Area in km^{2}	Pop'n census 2010	Pop'n census 2020	Pop'n estimate mid 2024	No. of villages	Post codes
32.78.05	Kawalu	41.59	84,930	96,780	104,944	10	46182
32.78.07	Tamansari	36.76	63,073	77,070	84,994	8	46191
32.78.06	Cibeureum	18.61	61,238	68,600	74,314	9	46196 - 46416
32.78.10	Purbaratu	12.16	38,130	44,380	47,549	6	46190
32.78.03	Tawang	6.90	62,641	60,160	65,296	5	46111 - 46115
32.78.01	Cihideung	5.45	71,507	71,950	75,422	6	46121 - 46126
32.78.08	Mangkubumi	24.17	85,193	97,910	104,072	8	46181
32.78.04	Indihiang	10.89	47,554	57,570	62,569	8	46151 - 46411
32.78.09	Bungursari	17.57	45,733	60,190	65,865	7	46151
32.78.02	Cipedes	9.04	74,949	81,560	85,814	4	46131 - 46134
	Totals	183.14	634,948	716,155	770,839	69	

== 1996 riot ==
The city of Tasikmalaya was the site of a widely reported riot in late December 1996. Four people were killed and several churches and dozens of mostly Chinese-owned businesses were destroyed in the violence, which was triggered by allegations of police brutality. It was also fueled and angered by frustration with allegedly corrupt local government officials. The event was among the earliest of many riots with religion- and class-based undertones that occurred in Java during the late 1990s.

== Natural disasters ==
On 5 April 1982, the volcano of Gunung Galunggung erupted about 24 km from the city, causing major damage through lahar and ash projection, and forcing a temporary evacuation of the area.

On 2 September 2009 a magnitude 7 earthquake struck, destroying a number of buildings in the city and killing several people.

On 26 June 2010, a magnitude 6.3 earthquake struck Tasikmalaya at 4:45pm Waktu Indonesia Barat (WIB). No injuries or destroyed buildings were reported.

On 20 May 2012, a magnitude 5 earthquake struck. It happened at 07:37pm Waktu Indonesia Barat (WIB). No injuries or destroyed buildings were reported.

== Toll Road ==
A toll road was planned to be built in 2018 connecting Tasikmalaya and Bandung's Ring Road 2.

== Wiriadinata Airport ==
Wiriadinata Airport in Cibeureum (also called Cibeureum Airport) was solely a military airport, but on 9 June 2017 it became a military airport with a civil airport enclave. With its 1,200 metres runway, it can accommodate ATR 72-600 aircraft.

== Archeology ==
Several Idols of the Gods, including Ganesha were found at the banks of the Parit Galunggung river in 2020.

== Climate ==
Tasikmalaya has a tropical rainforest climate (Köppen Af) with heavy to very heavy rainfall year-round.

Climate data for Tasikmalaya
Month	Jan	Feb	Mar	Apr	May	Jun	Jul	Aug	Sep	Oct	Nov	Dec	Year
Mean daily maximum °C (°F)	29.4 (84.9)	29.7 (85.5)	29.8 (85.6)	29.9 (85.8)	29.8 (85.6)	29.0 (84.2)	27.8 (82.0)	28.2 (82.8)	28.7 (83.7)	29.6 (85.3)	29.5 (85.1)	29.5 (85.1)	29.2 (84.6)
Daily mean °C (°F)	25.6 (78.1)	25.6 (78.1)	25.7 (78.3)	25.8 (78.4)	25.7 (78.3)	24.8 (76.6)	23.9 (75.0)	24.0 (75.2)	24.5 (76.1)	25.4 (77.7)	25.6 (78.1)	25.7 (78.3)	25.2 (77.4)
Mean daily minimum °C (°F)	21.8 (71.2)	21.5 (70.7)	21.6 (70.9)	21.7 (71.1)	21.6 (70.9)	20.6 (69.1)	20.1 (68.2)	19.9 (67.8)	20.3 (68.5)	21.3 (70.3)	21.8 (71.2)	21.9 (71.4)	21.2 (70.1)
Average rainfall mm (inches)	351 (13.8)	293 (11.5)	315 (12.4)	248 (9.8)	279 (11.0)	227 (8.9)	177 (7.0)	244 (9.6)	315 (12.4)	288 (11.3)	288 (11.3)	362 (14.3)	3,387 (133.3)
Source: Climate-Data.org

== Famous People ==
- Mu'min Ainul Mubarak
- Caca Handika
- Rhoma Irama
- Farida Pasha
- Susi Susanti
- Evie Tamala
- Yayan Ruhian

== Pictures gallery ==
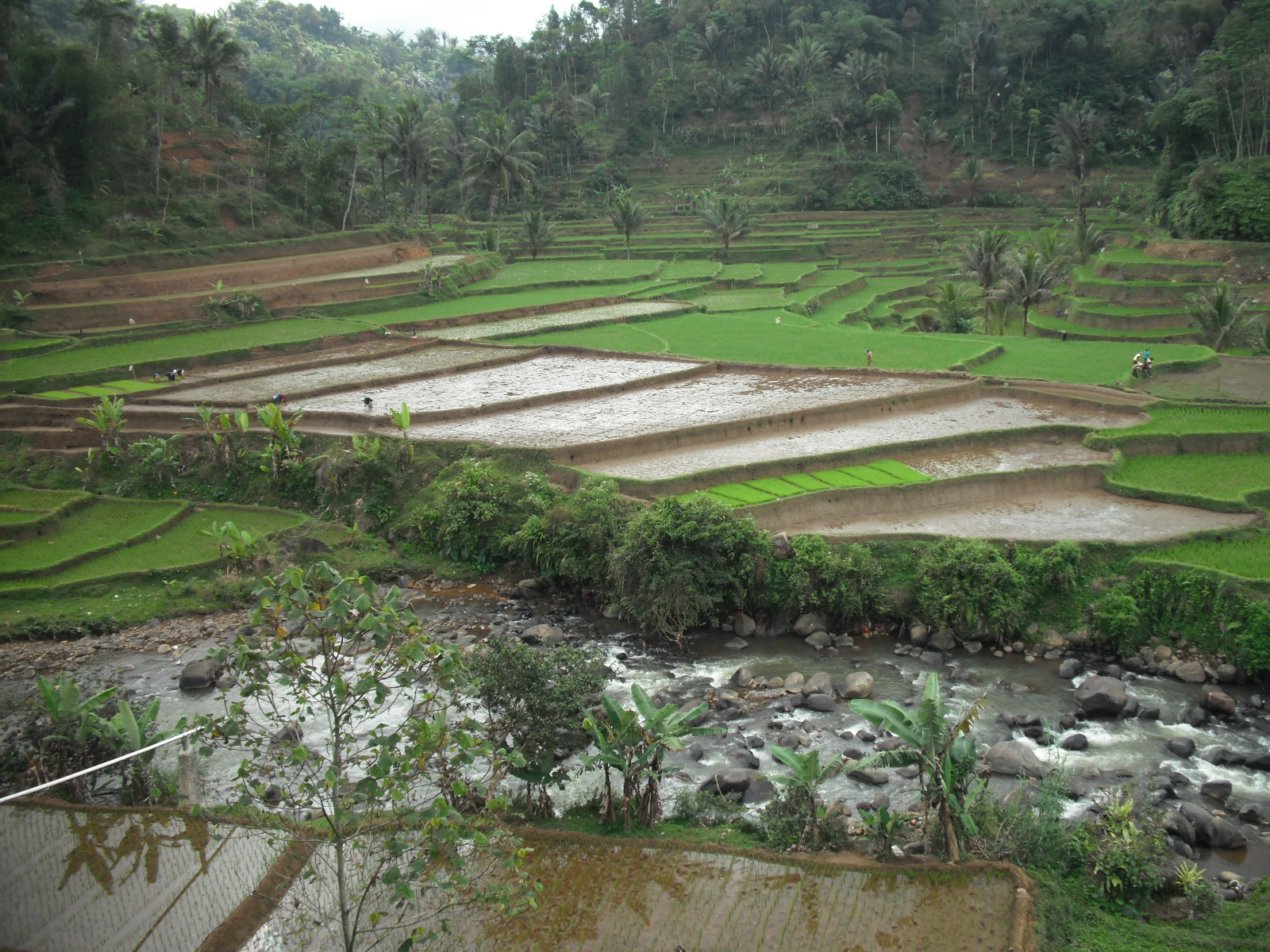
Rice plants

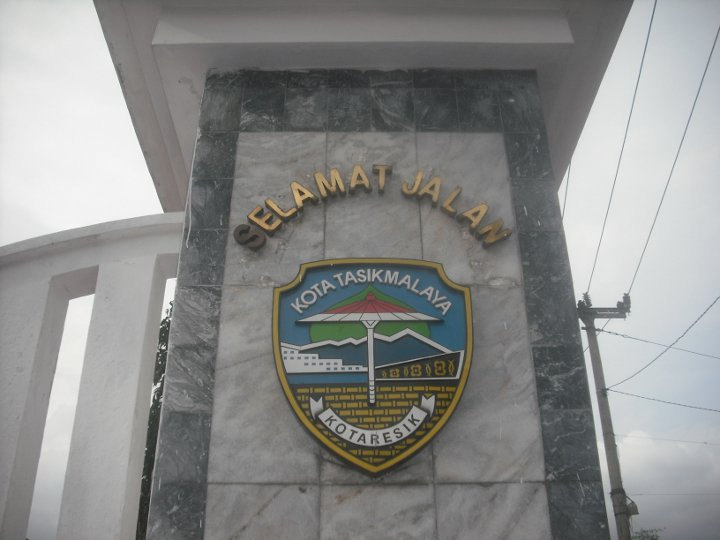
Coat of arms of the city in a boundary monument
