= List of regencies and cities in West Java =

This is a list of regencies and cities in West Java province. As of October 2019, there were 18 regencies and 9 cities.

Logo	Region Code	Name of Regency or City	Seat	Area in km^{2}	Pop'n 2010 Census	Pop'n 2020 Census	Pop'n mid 2024 Estimate	Pop'n Density mid 2024 (per km^{2})
	32.75	Bekasi City		213.04	2,334,871	2,543,676	2,644,058	12,411
	32.16	Bekasi Regency	Central Cikarang	1,251.02	2,630,401	3,113,017	3,273,868	2,617
	32.76	Depok City		199.91	1,738,570	2,056,335	2,163,635	10,823
	32.71	Bogor City		111.37	950,334	1,043,070	1,078,351	9,683
	32.01	Bogor Regency	Cibinong	2,991.78	4,771,932	5,427,068	5,682,303	1,899
		Bodebek region/Jakarta sub-regional totals		4,767.12	12,426,108	14,183,166	14,842,215	3,113
	32.72	Sukabumi City		48.31	298,681	346,325	365,740	7,571
	32.02	Sukabumi Regency	Palabuhanratu	4,164.15	2,341,409	2,725,450	2,828,020	679
	32.03	Cianjur Regency	Cianjur	3,631.92	2,171,281	2,477,560	2,584,990	712
		West Parahyangan region totals		7,844.38	4,811,371	5,549,335	5,778,750	737
	32.17	West Bandung Regency (Bandung Barat)	Ngamprah	1,283.44	1,510,284	1,788,336	1,884,190	1,468
	32.77	Cimahi City		42.43	541,177	568,400	598,700	14,110
	32.73	Bandung City		166.59	2,394,873	2,444,160	2,528,160	15,176
	32.04	Bandung Regency	Soreang	1,740.84	3,178,543	3,623,790	3,753,120	2,156
pus	32.11	Sumedang Regency	North Sumedang	1,566.20	1,093,602	1,152,507	1,187,130	758
		Central Parahyangan region/Bandung sub-regional totals		4,799.50	8,718,479	9,577,193	9,951,300	2,073
	32.05	Garut Regency	Garut	3,101.24	2,404,121	2,585,607	2,716,950	876
	32.78	Tasikmalaya City		183.94	635,464	716,155	750,730	4,081
	32.06	Tasikmalaya Regency	Singaparna	2,705.86	1,675,675	1,865,203	1,920,920	710
	32.18	Pangandaran Regency	Parigi	1,128.18	383,848	423,667	434,100	385
	32.79	Banjar City		131.01	175,157	200,973	209,790	1,601
	32.07	Ciamis Regency	Ciamis	1,595.94	1,148,656	1,229,069	1,259,230	789
		East Parahyangan region totals		8,846.17	6,422,921	7,020,674	7,291,720	824
	32.08	Kuningan Regency	Kuningan	1,192.90	1,035,589	1,167,686	1,213,927	1,018
	32.74	Cirebon City		39.44	296,389	333,303	344,851	8,744
	32.09	Cirebon Regency	Sumber	1,071.95	2,067,196	2,270,621	2,387,961	2,228
	32.10	Majalengka Regency	Majalengka	1,330.17	1,166,473	1,305,476	1,352,541	1,017
pus	32.12	Indramayu Regency	Indramayu	2,076.06	1,663,737	1,834,434	1,914,037	922
		Rebana region/Cirebon sub-regional totals		5,710.52	6,229,384	6,911,520	7,213,317	1,263
pus	32.13	Subang Regency	Subang	2,165.55	1,465,157	1,595,320	1,663,160	768
pus	32.14	Purwakarta Regency	Purwakarta	993.09	852,521	997,869	1,050,340	1,058
pus	32.15	Karawang Regency	West Karawang	1,913.71	2,127,791	2,439,085	2,554,380	1,335
		Purwasuka region totals		5,072.35	4,445,469	5,032,274	5,267,889	1,033
		Totals for all regions		37,040.04	43,053,732	48,274,162	50,345,189	1,359
