= Rajapolah =

Rajapolah is a village (desa) and an administrative district (kecamatan) in Tasikmalaya Regency in the Province of West Java, Indonesia. It covers a land area of 16.40 km^{2}, and had a population of 44,479 at the 2010 Census and 50,201 at the 2020 Census; the official estimate as at mid 2025 was 52,714 - comprising 27,370 males and 26,206 females in 2024.

The district is well known for its handicrafts, and is one of the most important districts in Tasikmalaya Regency, both economically and culturally.

== Geography ==
Rajapolah is situated in the middle of the drainage basin of northwestern Tasikmalaya Regency. The district lies in a relatively low-laying ground at an average height of 450 m and is surrounded by the Galunggung highlands to the west and the Sawal highlands to the east. The land of the district is mainly a gently inclined area as it slopes down from the west towards the east exit channel of the basin of the Citanduy River.

Located 17 km northeast of Tasikmalaya Regency's capital Singaparna, the district comprises an area of 16.40 km^{2}, consisting of 39% of drylands and 61% of wetland. It borders with Jamanis District to the north, and borders with Ciamis Regency to the east as it lined with Citanduy River. On the south, Rajapolah is bounded by Cisayong District, and on the west is bounded by Sukahening District.

== Villages ==
The district centre is in the village of Rajapolah, and the district is sub-divided into eight rural villages (desa), all listed below with their areas and populations as at mid 2024, together with their postcodes.

Kode Wilayah	Name of desa	Area in km^{2}	Population mid 2024 estimate	Post code
32.06.34.2001	Dawagung	3.18	7,132	46155
32.06.34.2002	Rajapolah (village)	1.27	6,596	46155
32.06.34.2003	Manggunjaya	2.45	12,412	46155
32.06.34.2004	Manggunsari	2.55	5,539	46155
32.06.34.2005	Sukaraja	2.33	7,405	46183
32.06.34.2006	Rajamandala	1.38	4,880	46155
32.06.34.2007	Sukanagalih	1.52	5,015	46155
32.06.34.2008	Tanjungpura	1.72	4,497	46155
32.06.34	Totals	16.40	53,576	

== Culture ==
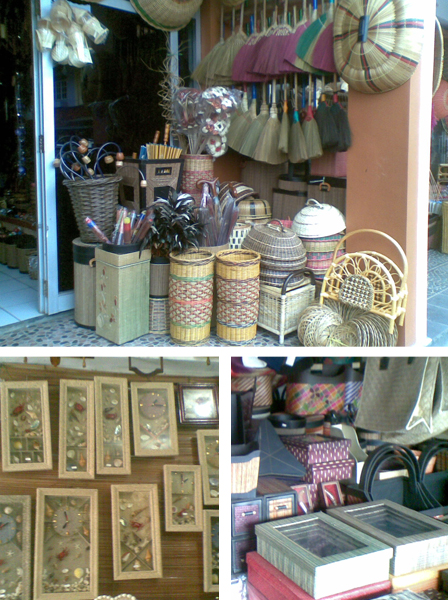
A picture taken from a handicraft shop in Rajapolah Handicraft Centre in Rajapolah Subdistrict

The people of Rajapolah District, with an estimated population of 53,576 in mid 2024, are noted for their traditional works, the handicrafts. They produced a wide range area of crafts, from decorative items such as wall hangings, rugs, jewelry boxes, picture frames, to functional goods, like baskets, bags, mats, racks, plates, sandals, and cushions. Their products are exported worldwide, mainly to the U.S.A., Europe, and some Asian regions. Most of the artisans created their works traditionally with their hands through weaving, plaiting, and coiling, and commonly using simple and traditional equipment. Their creations are mainly made from natural materials, such as wood, bamboo, reed, cane (rattan), rush, water hyacinth, sisal fibre, ash-wood splints, jute cord, absorbent paper, pandan, mendong (straw), and other natural materials.
