= Cirahong railway bridge =

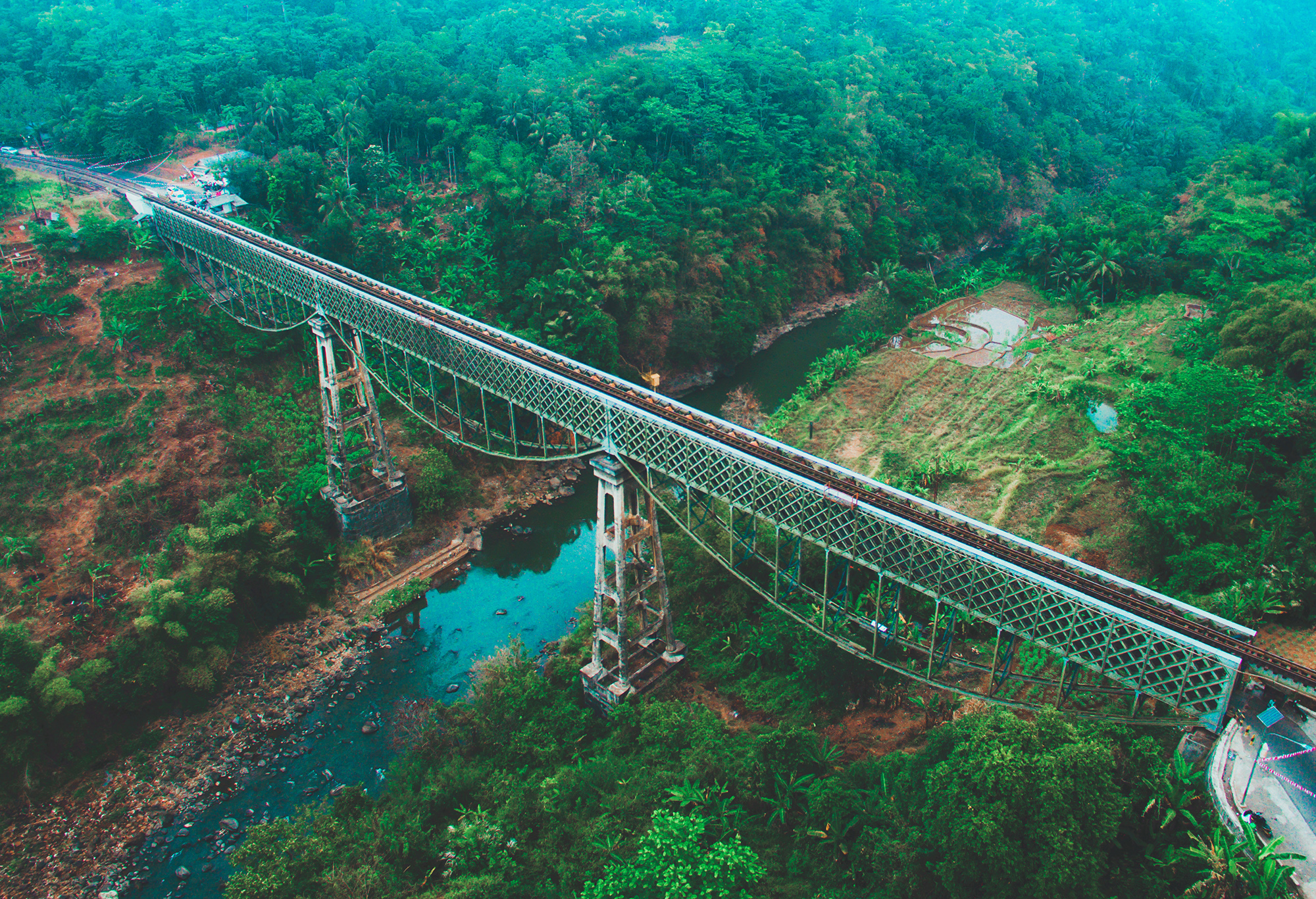
- Cirahong railway bridge viewed from the sky, 2018
- Coordinates: 7°20′24″S 108°19′02″E
- Crosses: Padalarang–Kasugihan
- Locale: Tasikmalaya Regency & Ciamis Regency border, West Java
- Begins: Manonjaya
- Ends: Ciamis
- Owner: Kereta Api Indonesia

Characteristics
- Height: 66 meters

Rail characteristics
- Track gauge: 1067 mm

History
- Built: 1893
- Opened: 1893
- Rebuilt: 1954 (bridge reinforcement)

Statistics
- Daily traffic: only 2 tire of the Motorcycle & the Walker since 2021

Location
- Interactive map of Cirahong railway bridge

Cirahong railway bridge (Indonesian: Jembatan Cirahong) is an railway bridge that linked between Bandung & Kroya. The railway bridge located in Manonjaya, Tasikmalaya with the border of Ciamis Regency. The long of the Cirahong railway bridge is 202 meters, while the height is 66 meter.

The Cirahong railway bridge have Wisdom Building (BH) 1290 also located eastern of the Manonjaya railway station.

The Cirahong railway bridge it is classified as a double-traffic wall bridge. The upper part of the bridge is used for train traffic, while the lower part is used for vehicle traffic. However, passing vehicles must take turns entering due to the narrowness of the bridge. The Cirahong railway bridge serves as an alternative route from Tasikmalaya to Ciamis via Manonjaya and vice versa.

The Cirahong railway bridge is the only bridge that left over from the Dutch in Ciamis Regency.

== History ==
The Cirahong railway bridge was begun in 1893. The construction of the Cirahong railway bridge was part of the construction of the southern railway line on Java Island by the Dutch East Indies Government. In 1954, along with the arrival of new diesel locomotives, starting with the CC 200 series, semicircular structures began to be added to the lower part of the bridge frame, between the existing pillars, like most other bridges in Indonesia.

In July 2021, the Cirahong railway bridge is undergoing maintenance, preventing motorized vehicles from crossing it for a month. However, trains can still cross the upper part of the bridge. After its opening, the Cirahong railway bridge is no longer permitted to be crossed by 3-wheeled vehicles or more, due to the bridge being over 100 years old. This meaning no one of the vehicles with 3 tiers or above for passing.

As the Information, the Cirahong II railway bridge will built for replacing the Cirahong I railway bridge soon by the Government of Ciamis soon.

== Service ==
Here it's train that crossing the Cirahong railway bridge:

=== Passenger ===
- Executive class
  - Argo Wilis, between Bandung and Surabaya Gubeng
  - Turangga, between Bandung and Surabaya Gubeng
- Mixed class
  - Lodaya, between Bandung and Solo Balapan (executive–economy)
  - Malabar, between Bandung and Malang (executive–economy)
  - Mutiara Selatan, between Bandung and Surabaya Gubeng (executive–economy)
  - Pangandaran between Gambir and Banjar (executive–economy)
  - Sangkuriang, between Bandung and Ketapang (executive–economy)
- Economy class
  - Kahuripan, between Kiaracondong and Blitar
  - Kutojaya Selatan, between Kiaracondong and Kutoarjo
  - Pasundan, between Kiaracondong and Surabaya Gubeng
  - Serayu, between Pasar Senen and Purwokerto via Kroya - Kiaracondong - Purwakarta

=== Freight ===
- Over Night Services between Surabaya Kota and Bandung

== See also ==
- Cikubang railway bridge
