= Panjalu =

Panjalu may refer to:

- Kediri (historical kingdom), medieval Javanese kingdom also known as Panjalu
- Panjalu, a district in the Ciamis Regency, Indonesia
