= Esih =

- Esih given name in Standard Sundanese script
- Pronunciation: Ésih (Sundanese Alphabet); Esih (Indonesian Alphabet)
- Gender: Feminine
- Language: Sundanese

Origin
- Language: Sundanese
- Meaning: Affectionate, Loving
- Region of origin: Indonesia

Other names
- Variant forms: Écih, Icih
- Nickname: Sih

Ésih (Sundanese: ᮆᮞᮤᮂ, romanized: Ésih, Sundanese pronunciation: [ɛsih], romanized as Esih in Indonesian Spelling System) is a female Sundanese given name, meaning affectionate. Other forms of this name are Écih (ᮆᮎᮤᮂ) and Icih (ᮄᮎᮤᮂ).

Esih as first name was found 5 times in 3 different countries.

== Possible meanings ==
The meaning of the name Esih are "loving", "love philter" or "affectionate" in Sundanese.

== Notable people with this name ==
- Ade Uu Sukaesih, a mayor of Banjar, West Java, Indonesia for the period 2013–2018.

== Fictional character ==
- Sukaesih/Esih, one of the characters in the soap opera Preman Pensiun
