= Dengdeng waterfall =

Curug Dengdeng
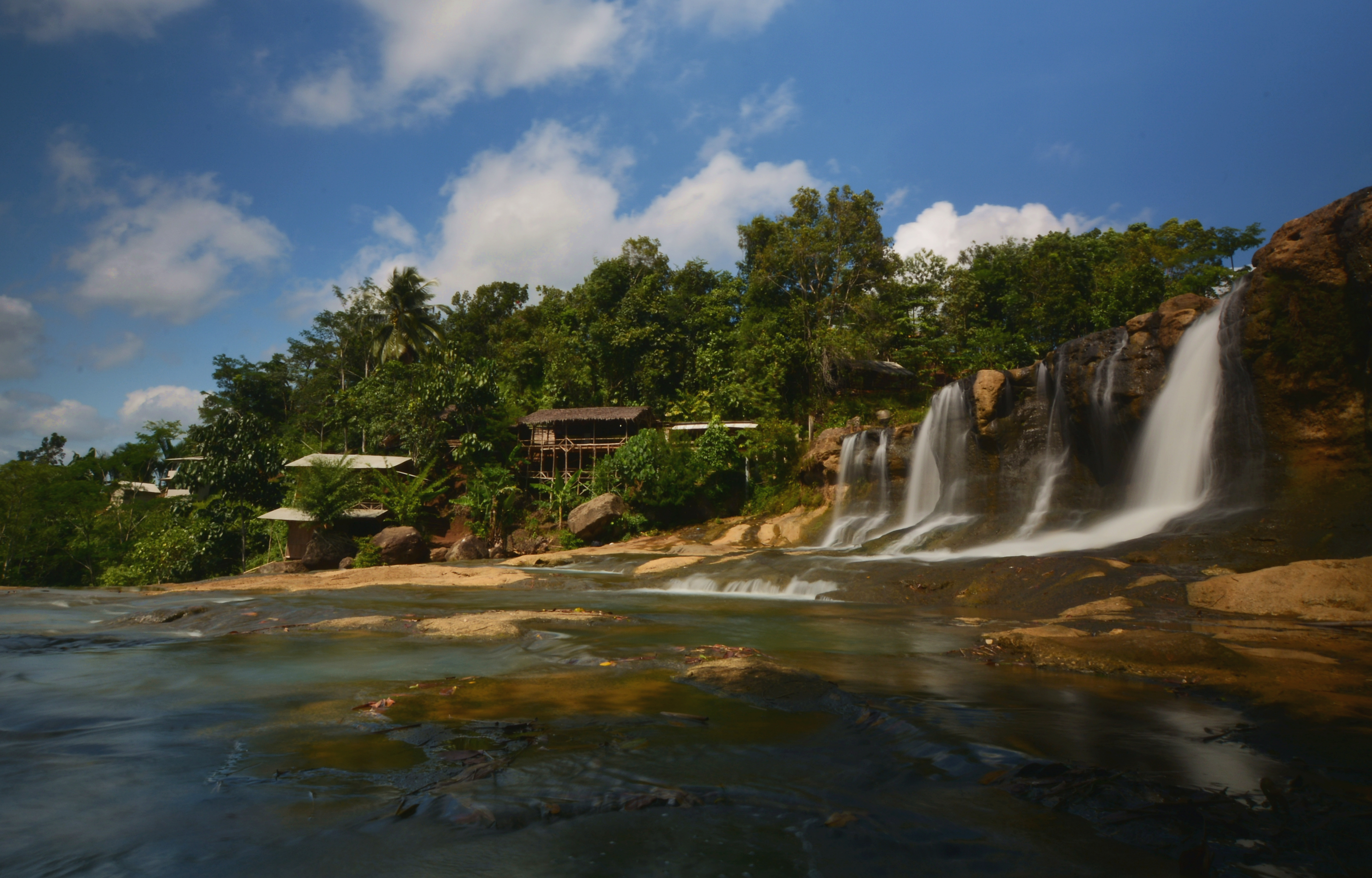
- Interactive map of Curug Dengdeng
- Location: Tasikmalaya, West Java, Indonesia
- Coordinates: 7°38′30″S 108°19′25″E

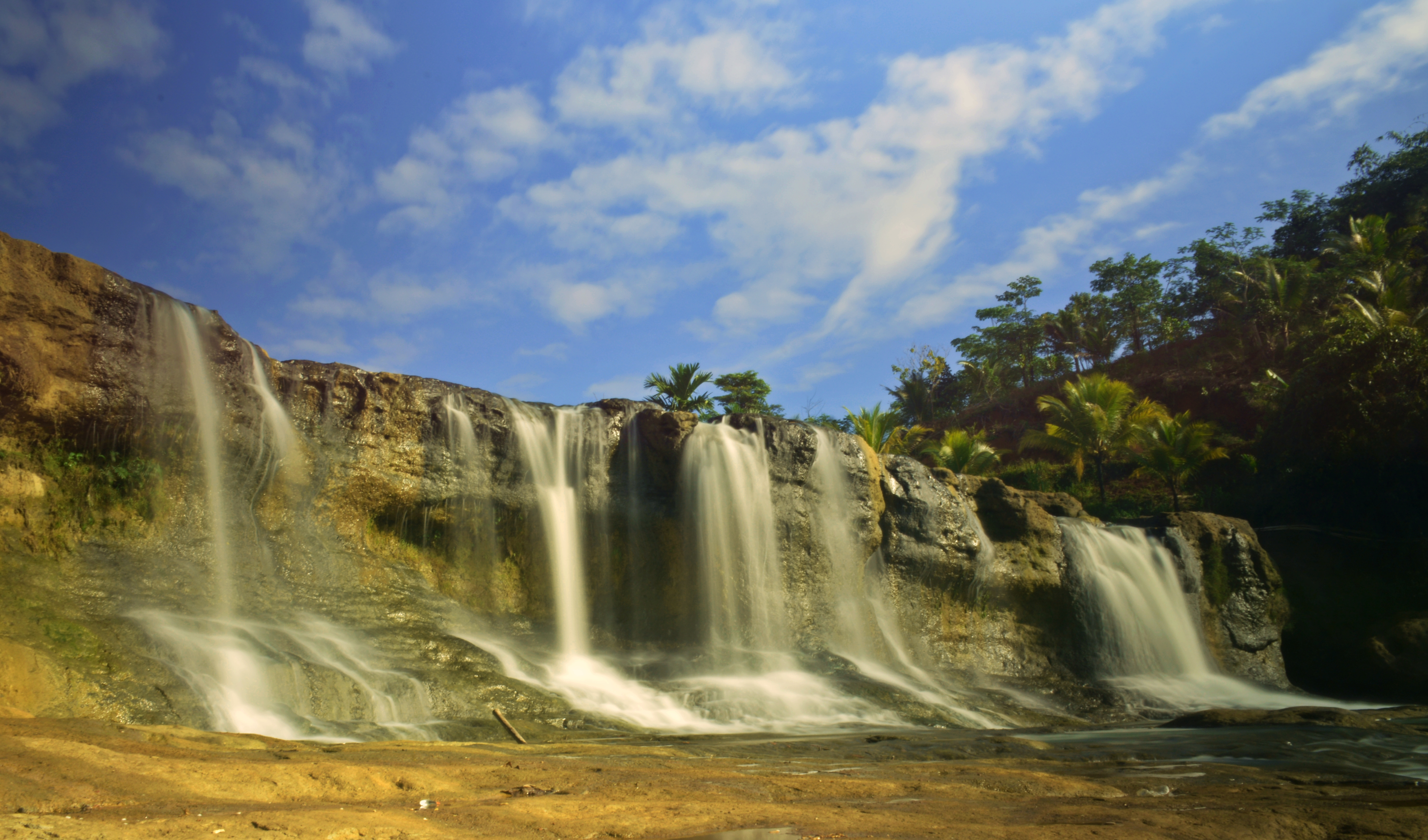
Dengdeng Waterfall or Curug Dengdeng

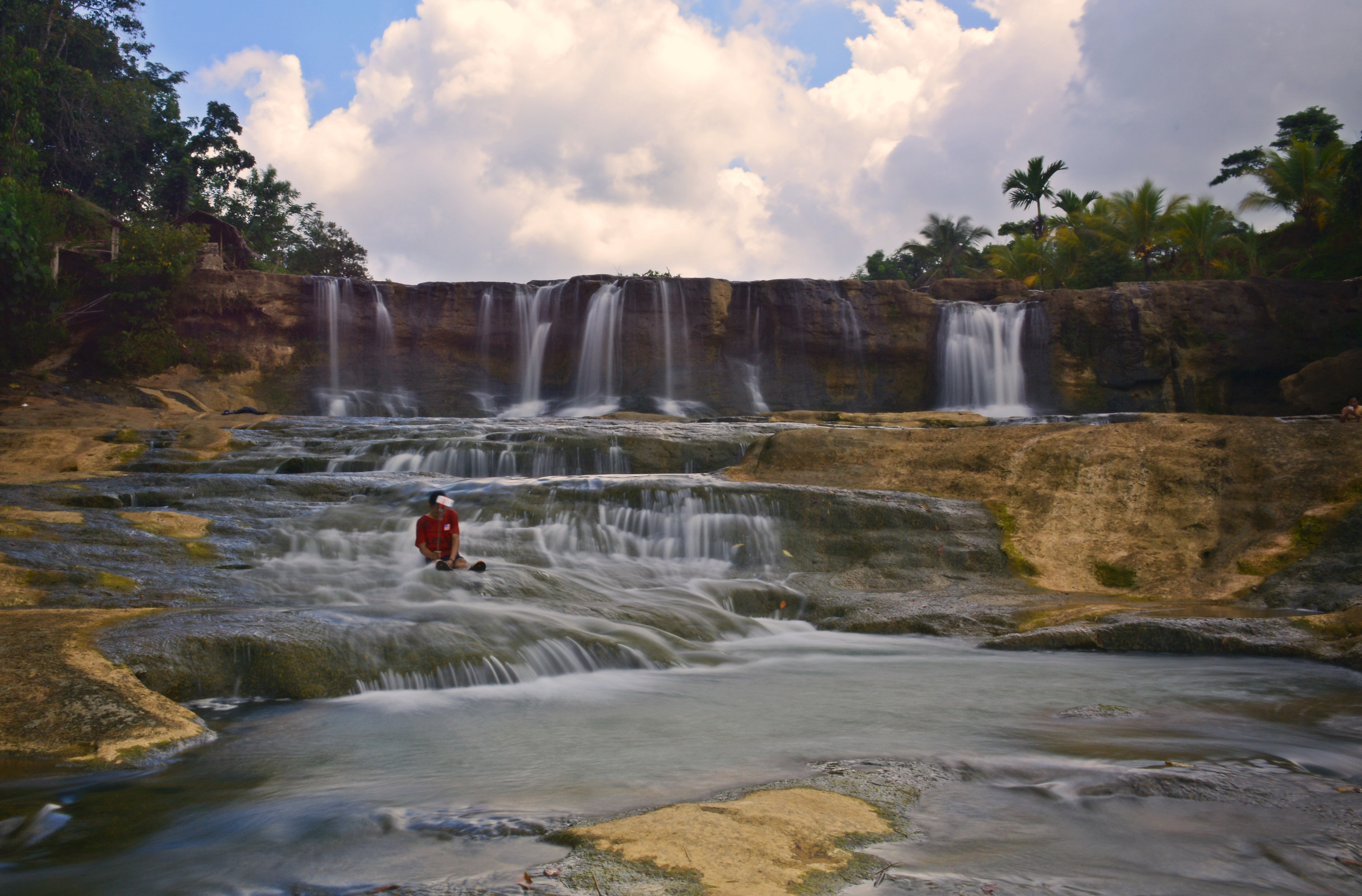
Dengdeng waterfall second terrain

The Dengdeng Waterfall (Indonesian: Curug Dengdeng) is located in the Tasikmalaya Regency in West Java.

== Etymology ==
The name "Dengdeng" comes from the word Bedengan, which means level in Indonesia. The upstream of this waterfall is located on Mount Raja (King Mountain), while its downstream is at Cimedang river.

== Location ==
Dengdeng Waterfall is located in Caringin Hamlet, Cikawung Gading Village, Cipatujah Subdistrict, Tasikmalaya Regency, West Java Province. It is approximately 90 kilometers from Tasikmalaya City and takes around 3 hours to reach.

== Physical makeup ==
Dengdeng waterfall has 3 terrains. The first terrain stands about 13 meters high, while the second and third terrains are approximately 11 and 9 meters high, respectively. Below the last waterfall, there is a large pool with fresh, clear water where tourists are allowed to bathe.

Nowadays, tourists can drive up to a parking lot located near the second waterfall. From there, visitors only need to walk down a set of wooden stairs to reach the second level and view the waterfall up close.
