= Ci Tanduy =

River in Java, Indonesia

Ci Tanduy Citanduy Citandui, Tjilandoh, Tji Tandoei, Tjitandoej, Tji Tanduj, Tjitandoeli, Chi Tando, Tjitanduj, Tji Tandoej
- Location of the mouth Ci Tanduy (Indonesia)

Location
- Country: Indonesia
- State: Jawa Barat, Jawa Tengah

Physical characteristics
- Mouth: Muara Citanduy, Indian Ocean
  - location: Cilacap
  - coordinates: 7°40′28″S 108°48′06″E
- Length: 178 km (111 mi)
- Basin size: 3,704 km^{2} (1,430 mi^{2})
- Discharge
  - location: Near mouth
  - average: 325 m^{3}/s (11,500 cu ft/s)

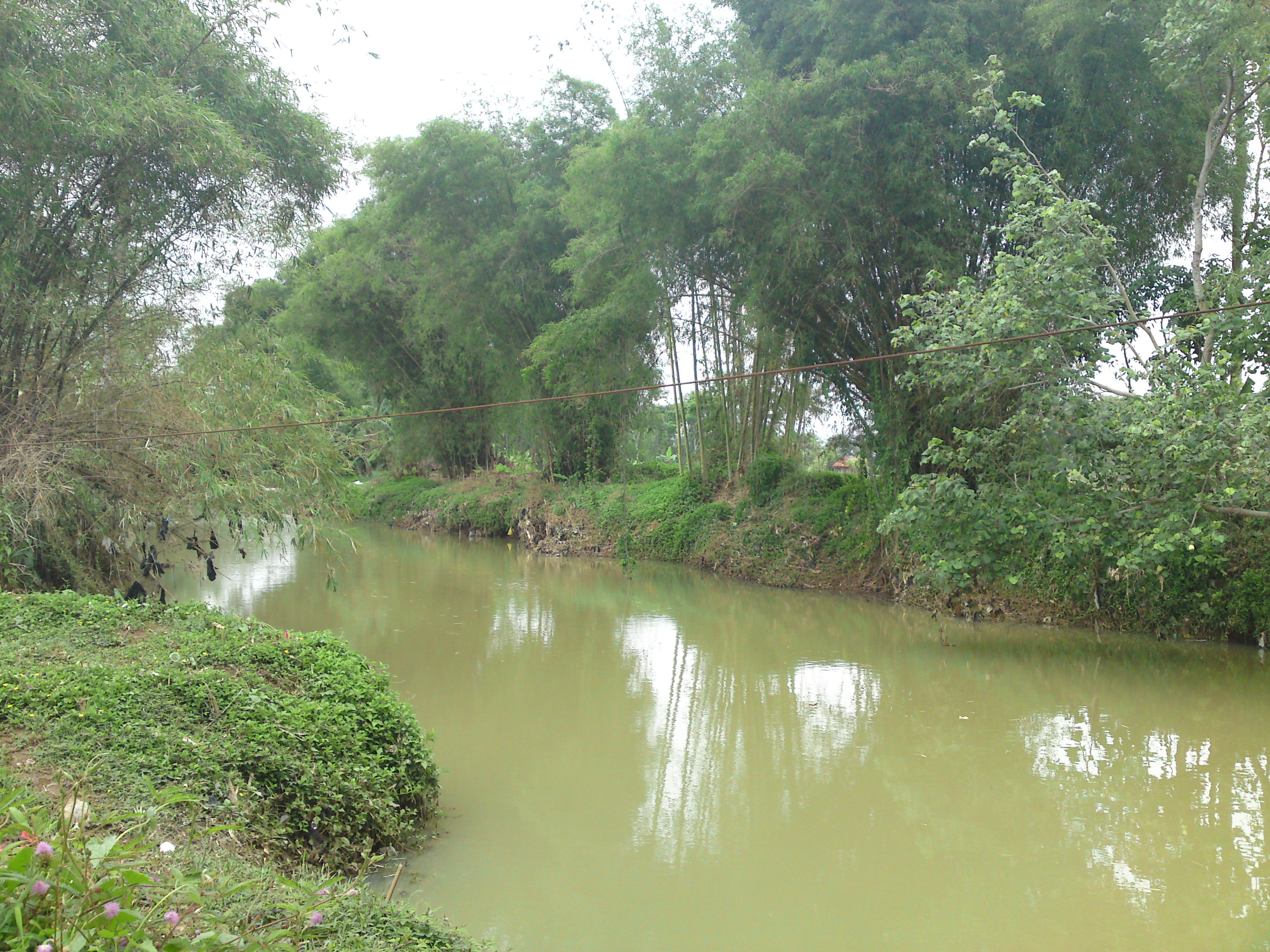
CITANDUY RIVER

Ci Tanduy (Sundanese "Ci" means "river", so the whole name means "Tanduy River"; Indonesian: Sungai Citanduy) is a river in the island of Java, Indonesia, about 270 km to the southeast of the capital Jakarta. It flows from West Java to Central Java province, exiting through the Bay of Citanduy (Indonesian: Teluk Citanduy) to the Indian Ocean, forming a delta called "Muara Citanduy."

== Geography ==
Ci Tanduy

Climate chart (precipitation, max. and min. temperature)
J	F	M	A	M	J	J	A	S	O	N	D
432 23 22	372 22 18	345 24 22	369 22 22	279 24 22	255 23 21	299 23 20	60 24 20	56 24 20	118 24 21	429 25 20	533 24 19
- █ Average max. and min. temperatures in °C
- █ Precipitation totals in mm
Imperial conversion
J	F	M	A	M	J	J	A	S	O	N	D
17 73 72	15 72 64	14 75 72	15 72 72	11 75 72	10 73 70	12 73 68	2.4 75 68	2.2 75 68	4.6 75 70	17 77 68	21 75 66
- █ Average max. and min. temperatures in °F
- █ Precipitation totals in inches

The river flows along the southwest area of Java with a predominantly tropical monsoon climate. The annual average temperature in the area is 22 °C. The warmest month is March, when the average temperature is around 23 °C, and the coldest is February, at 20 °C. The average annual rainfall is 3547 mm. The wettest month is December, with an average of 533 mm of rainfall, and the driest is September, with 56 mm of rainfall.

== Historical notes ==
On the Ci Tanduy river bank, around the construction area of the Leuwikeris Dam in Ciamis Regency, a peculiarly carved stone with a human foot track was discovered. This stone may be related to the ancient kingdoms of Bojong Galuh and Galuh established along the river around the 7th century.

An intact steel tank from the former Netherlands Armed Forces was found buried for about 70 years at the bottom of Ci Tanduy near the City of Banjar. The body could be seen when the river water level dropped very low. The armored vehicle was thought to be stranded during the Independence War of 1945-1949 on the way to Yogyakarta. An effort was made in 2012 to pull it out but failed as the rain fell hard, increasing the river water level again.

== Flood management ==
The high debit of river water during the rainy season often caused damage to dams, bridges, farmlands, and also loss of lives. On 10 October 2016 the Ketapangjaya Bridge, a national bridge connecting West and Central Java, was damaged by the erosion of Ci Tanduy tributaries near the City of Banjar. To manage the flood, the government continuously builds, maintains, and repairs the dams along the river in steps.

== Drainage basin ==
The drainage basin of Citanduy covers several administrative areas in West Java and Central Java as the river passes through Tasikmalaya Regency, Ciamis Regency, the City of Banjar, Majalengka Regency, Kuningan Regency, and Cilacap Regency, covering an area of 4,651 km^{2} in the two provinces. It becomes a priority to manage in Java due to the high rate of sedimentation in the downstream area. Geographically the river area is located between 108°04' and 109°30' E, 7°03' and 7°52' S, extending from the mountainous north of Cakrabuana mountain range (1,721 m; the location of the main spring of the river) to the lowland south of Segara Anakan, bordering the island of Nusa Kambangan and Indian Ocean to the south. Mount Galunggung (2168 m), Mount Telaga Bodas (2201 m), and Mount Sadakeling (1676 m) form the western border, Mount Simpang Tiga is the eastern border, and in the center upstream area stands Mount Sawal (1784 m).

The downstream area has a unique mangrove ecosystem in Segara Anakan and Nusa Kambangan. However, the high rate of sedimentation threatens its existence. In 1970 the total Segara Anakan Bay area was about 4580 hectares, then in 2002 down to 850 hectares. In 2005, the lagoon dropped further to 700 hectares, and in early 2012 is only 600 hectares. As the main cause of sedimentation is identified at the border of Ciamis Regency and Cilacap Regency, a new canal was built in 2012 from Citanduy River to pass the Ciamis Regency, exiting directly to the Indian Ocean in Nusawiru near Pangandaran Beach.

== Biota ==
Dozens of species of fish live in Ci Tanduy. In the neighborhood of Jatiluhur course, Kartamihardja (2008) noted the presence of 20 species of fish. This figure has changed shrunk in the last 40 years (1977-2007); initially recorded as many as 34 species with a composition of 23 native species and 11 newcomers (introduction). Changes in ecosystems, from relatively shallow streams and rushing into a reservoir in the neighborhood and quiet, obviously affect the existence of the types of fish. However, the species that disappeared from the reservoir still can survive in other parts of Ci Tanduy. A summary obtained from an observer NGO Ci Tanduy, found dozens of species of fish from various locations on the river. However, until now it has not provided sufficient data regarding the diversity, distribution, and population of fish in this Ci Tanduy.

== See also ==
- Ciung Wanara
- List of drainage basins of Indonesia
- List of rivers of Indonesia
- Rajapolah
- Sunda Kingdom
