= Ciamis =

- Town and district

Regional transcription(s)
  - Sundanese: ᮎᮤᮃᮙᮤᮞ᮪
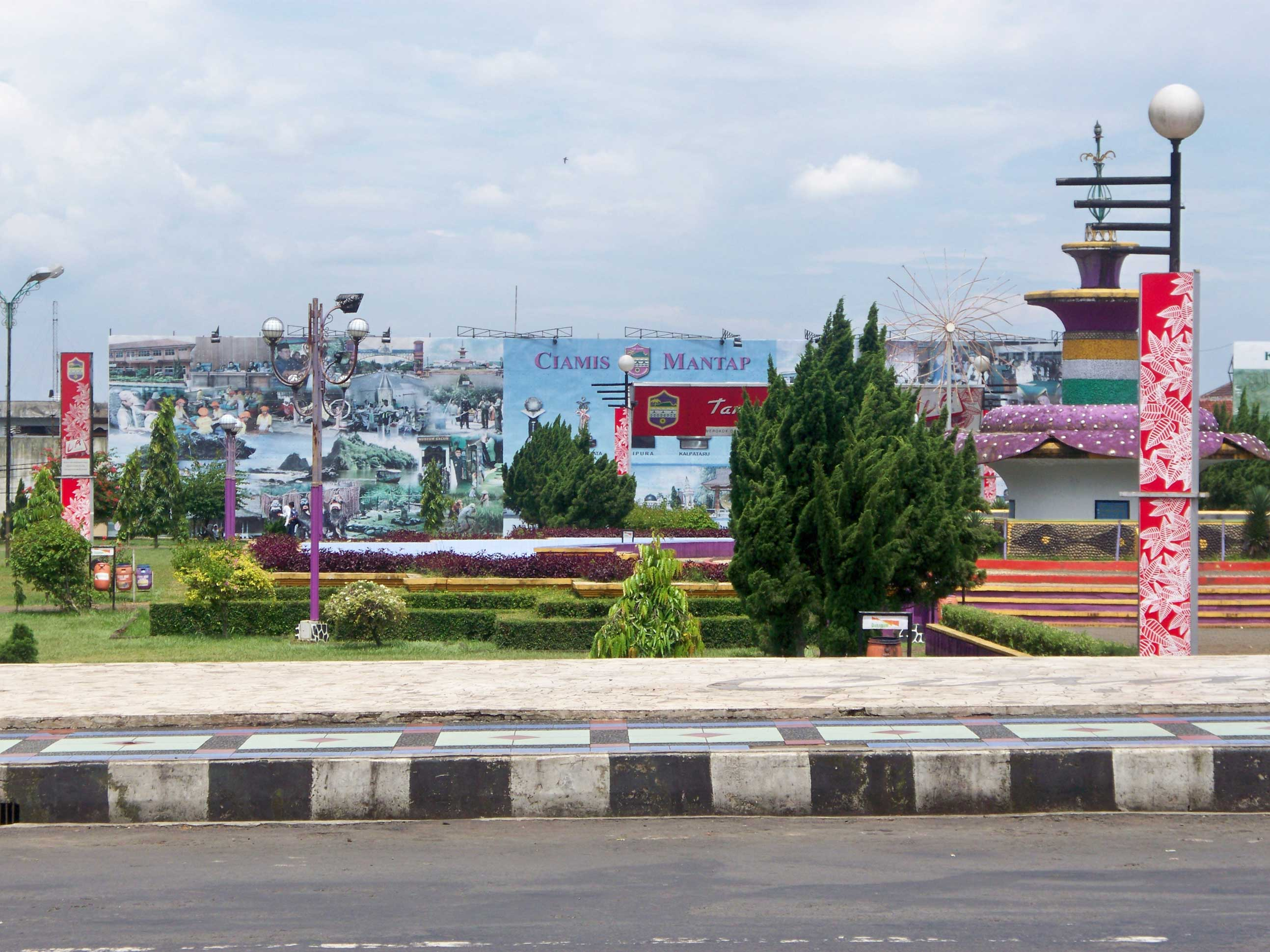
- Town square (Alun-alun) of Ciamis
- Etymology: Ciamis River (Ciamis means "Sweet River" in Sundanese)
- Location in Java and Indonesia Ciamis (Indonesia)
- Coordinates: 7°19′41″S 108°20′1″E
- Country: Indonesia
- Province: West Java
- Regency: Ciamis Regency

Government
  - District head: Dede Hermawan
  - Sub-district Secretary: Santoso Budi Raharjo

Area
  - Total: 33.80 km^{2} (13.05 sq mi)
- Elevation: 202 m (663 ft)

Population (mid 2024 estimate)
  - Total: 102,059
  - Density: 3,019/km^{2} (7,820/sq mi)
- Time zone: UTC+7 (IWT)
- Postal code: 4621x
- Area code: (+62) 265
- Villages: 12
- Website: Official website

Ciamis (Sundanese: ᮎᮤᮃᮙᮤᮞ᮪, romanized: Ciamis, [t͡ʃiamɪs]) is a district and a town; it is the regency seat of Ciamis Regency in West Java, Indonesia. It covers an area of 33.80 square kilometres (13.05 sq mi). It had a population of 93,744 as of the 2010 Census, 98,610 as of the 2020 Census, and 102,059 according to the mid-2024 official estimate.

== History ==
The process of determining the history of the Ciamis Regency was born with the decree of the Regional House of Representatives of Ciamis Regency of 6 October 1970, concerning the formation of the committee for the preparation of a history of the Galuh Kingdom, where the committee was advised by a team of historians from Ikip Bandung led by Said Raksanegara.

The committee preparing of the history of Galuh intends to explore and study the history of Galuh as a whole, considering that there are several alternatives in determining the date of its inception. Titimangsa Rahyangta in Medang Jati, namely the establishment of the Galuh Kingdom by Wretikkandayun on 23 March 612 AD, or the Rakean Jamri, also called Raiyang Sanjaya, before the Manarah came to power. Or, one could take the date from the following events: the name of Galuh Regency was changed to Ciamis Regency by the Regent, RD. Tumenggung Sastra Winata in 1916; moving the center of government from Imbanagara to Cibatu (Ciamis) by the Regent RD. AA. Wiradikusumah on 15 January 1815; or the transfer of the center of Galuh Regency from Garatengah which is located around Cineam (Tasikmalaya) to Barunay (Imbanagara) on 12 June 1642.

The Ikip Bandung history team finally concluded that the foundation date of the Ciamis Regency was 12 June 1642, which was later confirmed by a decree of the Regional People's Representative Council of the Ciamis Regency on 17 May 1972.

The word galuh comes from the Sanskrit language, and means gemstone; the Kingdom of Galuh means the "realm of beautiful sparkling gems".

From history, it is revealed that the founder of the Galuh kingdom was Wretikkandayun; he was the youngest son of Kandiawan who ruled the Kendan kingdom for 15 years (597–612) and later became a hermit in Layungwatang (brass area) and had the title Rajawesi Dewaraja or Sang Layungwatang. Wretikkandayun was based in Medangjati, but he founded a new government center that was named Galuh (which is located more or less in the present village of Karangkamulyan).

The aim of Wretikkandayun to build a government center in the Karangkamulyan area was to free itself from Tarumanagara, which had been a superpower for a long time. To realize his ambition, he had a good relationship with the Kalingga kingdom in Central Java. Even his youngest son took an oil bath in an arranged marriage with Parwati, the eldest daughter of Maharanissima. He was crowned on the 14th Sukla Paksha, month of the Chaitra, year 134 of the Shaka era (approximately 23 March 612 AD). The date was chosen according to tradition, Tarumanagara, because it is not only done on a full day but also on that date, the sun rises right at the eastern point.

== Geography ==
Ciamis Regency, part of the province of West Java, is bordered in the north by the Majalengka Regency and the Kuningan Regency, in the west by the Tasikmalaya Regency and Tasikmalaya City, in the east by Banjar City and Central Java Province, and in the south by Pangandaran Regency. Based on its geographical location, Ciamis Regency is in a strategic position, traversed by the national road across the province of West Java, Central Java Province, and the provincial road through Ciamis, Cirebon, Central Java. Its geographical location is at 108°20' to 108°40' east longitude and 7°40'20" to 7°41'20" south latitude.

The area of Ciamis Regency (since the splitting off of the new Pangandaran Regency) is 159,594 hectares (1,595.94 km^{2}; 616.20 mi^{2}) or 4.3 percent of the total land area of West Java Province. In the context of the development of the West Java Province, Ciamis Regency had two Mainstay Areas, namely the East Priangan Mainstay Area and the Pangandaran Mainstay Area, but the latter is now separated into the Pangandaran Regency. The average air temperature in Ciamis in 2009 ranged from 20.0°C to 30.0°C.

Places close to the coast have relatively high average air temperatures. Ciamis Regency is located on land with flat-to-hilly-to-mountainous terrain, with slopes ranging from 0–40%, with a 0-2% distribution found in the middle (from northeast to south) and 2-40% spread in almost all sub-districts. Soil type is dominated by latosol, podsolic, alluvial, and grumusol. The average rainfall in Ciamis Regency during 2009 was 606.50 millimetres (23.878 in), over 177.40 days. The highest rainfall occurred in March 2010 with 991 millimetres (39.0 in), and the lowest occurred in August 1967 (mm). The day with the most drizzle occurred in April 2014, and the lowest occurred in August 2016. Based on the climate classification according to Schmidt-Ferguson, Ciamis Regency generally has a C climate type.

The main river feeding Ciamis Regency is the Tanduy River, which flows from Mount Cakrabuana in Tasikmalaya Regency and empties into Sagara Anakan, Central Java Province, with its tributaries consisting of the Cimuntur River, Cijolang, and Ciseel rivers. In the southern part, the Cimedang River flows with its tributaries, consisting of the Cikondang River, Cibegal River, Cipaledang River, Cibungur River, Citatah River I, Citatah River II, Cigar River, Ciharuman River, Cigembor River, Cikuya River, Cijengkol River, Cimagung River, and Cicondong River. Note that in all of these names, the first syllable, "Ci," means "river" and should be omitted (as tautological) if the name is followed by the word "River". Most of the Ciamis Regency area is included in the Tanduy River Watershed (DAS), while the rest is included in the Medang River Watershed.

Ciamis Regency consists of 328 villages, with the topography predominantly characterized by 153 villages in the plains, 162 villages on the slopes, and 13 villages in the Watershed (DAS) area.

== Climate ==
Ciamis has a tropical rainforest climate (Af) with substantial-to-heavy rainfall year-round.

Climate data for Ciamis
Month	Jan	Feb	Mar	Apr	May	Jun	Jul	Aug	Sep	Oct	Nov	Dec	Year
Mean daily maximum °C (°F)	30.2 (86.4)	30.5 (86.9)	30.6 (87.1)	30.7 (87.3)	30.6 (87.1)	29.9 (85.8)	28.9 (84.0)	29.2 (84.6)	29.8 (85.6)	30.5 (86.9)	30.4 (86.7)	30.3 (86.5)	30.1 (86.2)
Daily mean °C (°F)	26.4 (79.5)	26.4 (79.5)	26.4 (79.5)	26.6 (79.9)	26.5 (79.7)	25.7 (78.3)	25.0 (77.0)	25.0 (77.0)	25.5 (77.9)	26.2 (79.2)	26.4 (79.5)	26.4 (79.5)	26.0 (78.9)
Mean daily minimum °C (°F)	22.6 (72.7)	22.3 (72.1)	22.3 (72.1)	22.5 (72.5)	22.4 (72.3)	21.5 (70.7)	21.1 (70.0)	20.8 (69.4)	21.2 (70.2)	22.0 (71.6)	22.5 (72.5)	22.6 (72.7)	22.0 (71.6)
Average rainfall mm (inches)	445 (17.5)	384 (15.1)	407 (16.0)	310 (12.2)	299 (11.8)	189 (7.4)	255 (10.0)	164 (6.5)	212 (8.3)	305 (12.0)	382 (15.0)	416 (16.4)	3,768 (148.2)
Source: Climate-Data.org

== Government ==
Since regional autonomy was implemented in 2001, in December 2002 Ciamis Regency experienced its first regional expansion, into Ciamis Regency with 30 districts and Banjar City with four districts. To accommodate the growing population of Ciamis Regency and improve governance efficiency, the region underwent significant changes in 2006. Six additional districts were established, increasing the total from 30 to 36. Similarly, from 2007 to 2009, the number of villages grew by three. These developments aimed to manage the expanding population better and ensure effective local administration. Likewise, for the same period, the number of Neighborhood Associations (RW) and Neighborhood Units (RT) experienced an increase of 27 Rukun Warga and 92 Rukun Tetangga. However, in October 2012, the southern part of the regency was separated to create the new Pangandaran Regency.

The number of civil servants in Ciamis increased from 18,404 in 2008 to 18,966 in 2009. Based on the composition of employees by gender, during 2007–2009, the average number of male employees increased by 1.37 percent while female employees increased by 6.47 percent. Furthermore, the available data also shows a decline in the quality of civil servants in terms of education, namely the increasing number of employees with high school education and below, while the number of employees with higher education (college diploma and above) is decreasing. This is due to the appointment of honorary employees who work in local governments with an average education level of less than high school.

The political map of Ciamis Regency as a result of the 2009 General Election (PEMILU) shows the dominance of the PDI-P in parliament (DPRD), with representation of Democrats and Golkar following. The number of DPRD members from the PDI-P was 11, more than a fifth of the total members of the Ciamis DPRD. The second and third-highest numbers were recorded by the Democratic Party and the Golkar Party with 9 and 8 seats, respectively. To finance development, in 2009 the Ciamis Regency government spent nearly 1.348 trillion rupiah as recorded in the realization of the Ciamis Regency Regional Revenue and Expenditure Budget (APBD). This number increased by 15.91% from the 2007 APBD. Of the total APBD of Ciamis Regency of 1.348 trillion, the original local government revenue (PAD) contributed only 0.051 trillion, or around 3.84%, while the general allocation funds (DAU) contributed around 1.05 trillion rupiah, or approximately 63.81%. Thus, financing development activities in Ciamis Regency depends on funds from outside the regency.

Ciamis District is divided into 12 administrative villages (of which seven are classed as urban kelurahan and five as rural desa) which are as follows, with their populations as estimated at mid 2024:

- Benteng (5,120)
- Ciamis (17,204)
- Cigembor (5,045)
- Cisadap (6,396)
- Imbanagara (7,747)
- Imbanagara Raya (7,399)
- Kertasari (11,548)
- Linggasari (8,072)
- Maleber (10,471)
- Panyingkiran (6,738)
- Pawindan (5,187)
- Sindangrasa (11,132)

== Education ==
The literacy rate in Ciamis Regency increased from 96.57 percent, in 2007, to 97.01 percent, in 2009. The average educational level also increased, from 6.78 years, in 2007, to 7.09 years, in 2009, due to more students attending the second year of middle school.

Achievements in education are closely related to the availability of educational facilities. At the elementary school level in Ciamis Regency in the 2009–2010 academic year, on average, a teacher taught 17 elementary school students; at the junior high school level, a teacher taught 21 students; at the high school level, a teacher taught 13 students. The school's capacity for elementary education in Ciamis Regency is 137 pupils, while at the middle school level, the capacity is 301 people, and at the high school level, 273 people.
