= Ade Sugianto =

Indonesian politician

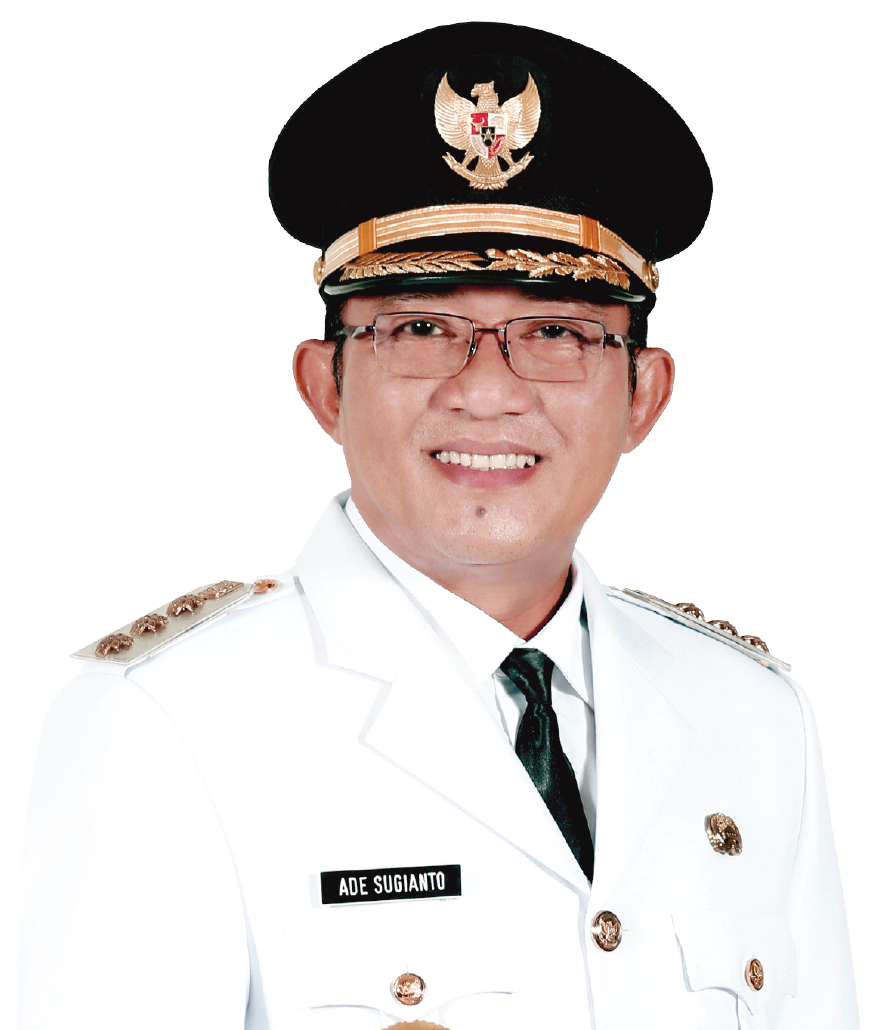

Regent of Tasikmalaya
- In office 3 December 2018 – 4 June 2025; Acting since 5 September 2018
- Preceded by: Uu Ruzhanul Ulum
- Succeeded by: Cecep Nurul Yakin

Vice Regent of Tasikmalaya
- In office 8 March 2011 – 3 December 2018
- Regent: Uu Ruzhanul Ulum
- Preceded by: Endang Hidayat
- Succeeded by: Dedi Ramdani Sagara

Personal details
- Born: 26 February 1966 (age 59) Tasikmalaya, West Java, Indonesia
- Party: PDI-P

Ade Sugianto (born 26 February 1966) is an Indonesian politician of the Indonesian Democratic Party of Struggle who served as the regent of Tasikmalaya Regency, West Java, from 2018 to 2025. He was previously the vice regent from 2011 to 2018 under Uu Ruzhanul Ulum, and had been elected into the regency Regional House of Representatives since 1999.

== Early life ==
Ade Sugianto was born on 26 February 1966 to E. Soekandar and E. Soertika. in Cikunir village (now Cikadongdong) in Tasikmalaya Regency. He studied in Tasikmalaya, graduating from high school in 1986.

== Career ==
In 1986, he was already a member of the Indonesian Democratic Party, becoming its local chairman at Kawalu District in Tasikmalaya city. Following the 1999 legislative election, he was elected into the Tasikmalaya Regency Regional House of Representatives (DPRD) as a PDI-P member. He initially served as deputy speaker until 2001, when he became its speaker until 2004. He would become deputy speaker again in 2009.

He ran as the running mate to Uu Ruzhanul Ulum in Tasikmalaya's 2011 regency election, with the support of PDI-P, the United Development Party, and the National Mandate Party. The pair won 263,003 votes (32.3%) and was elected out of eight candidates. They were sworn into office on 8 March 2011. Uu and Ade ran again in the 2015 regency election uncontested, securing 67.4% of votes against the "disapprove" option.

On 6 September 2018, as Uu became the vice governor of West Java following the province's 2018 gubernatorial election, Sugianto became acting regent of Tasikmalaya. He was sworn in as the full regent on 3 December 2018. He was reelected in the 2020 regency election, winning 315,332 votes (32.2%) in a four-way race.

He was replaced by Cecep Nurul Yakin on 4 June 2025.

== Family ==
He is married to Ai Diantani, and the couple has three children. Diantani was elected into the Tasikmalaya Regency DPRD in the 2024 legislative election.
