= Cipatujah =

District in West Java, Indonesia

Coordinates: 7.7335°S 108.0193°E

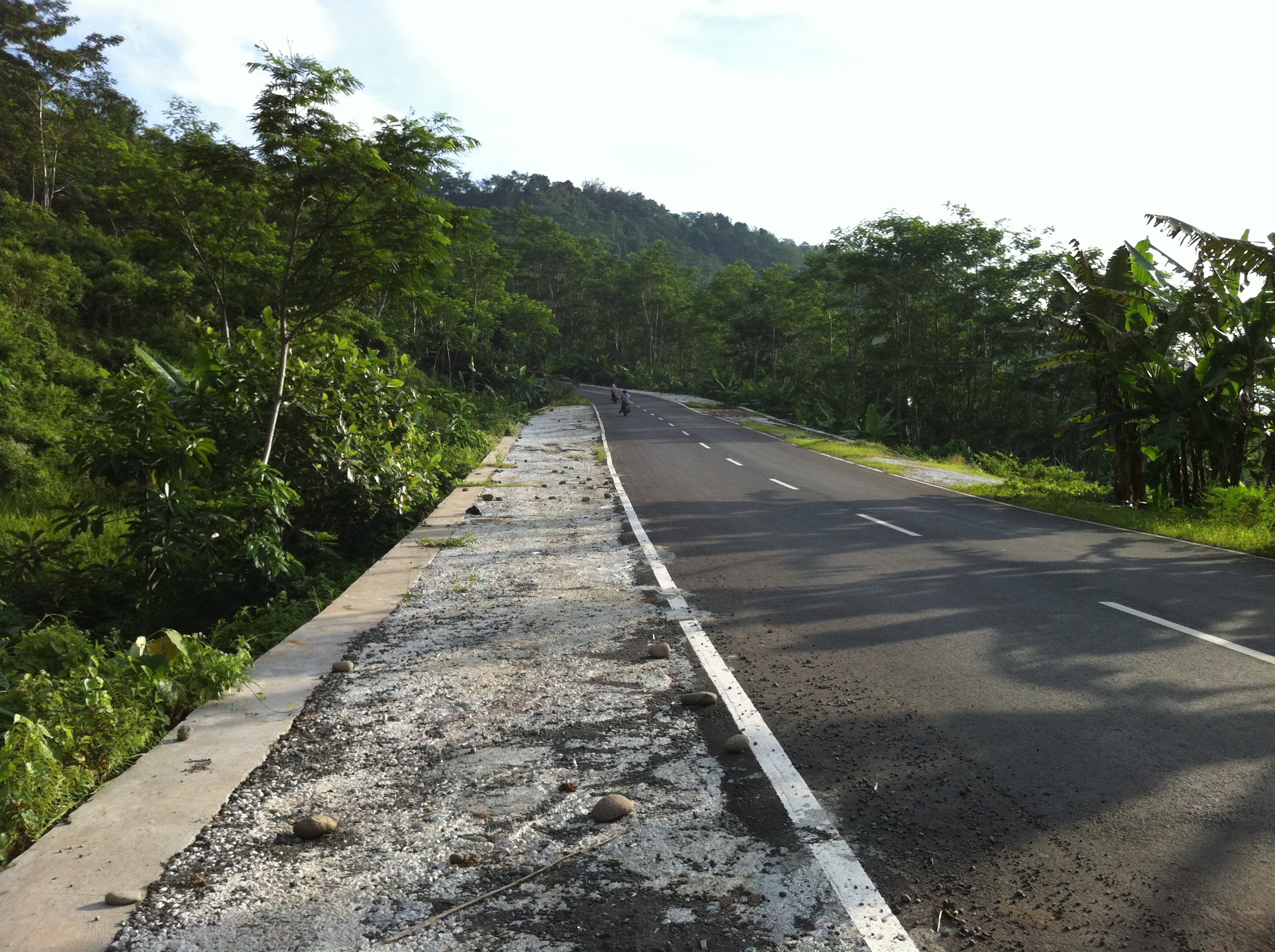
Roadside in Ciheras, Cipatujah

Cipatujah is a coastal district (kecamatan) in the south of Tasikmalaya Regency, West Java Province of Indonesia. The district covers a land area of 241.99 km^{2}, and had a population of 74,433 according to the official estimates for mid 2025.Badan Pusat Statistik, Jakarta, 27 February 2026, Kabupaten Tasikmalaya Dalam Angka 2026 (Katalog-BPS 1102001.3206)
