= Mangunreja =

- District
- Interactive map of Mangunreja
- Country: Indonesia
- Province: West Java
- Regency: Tasikmalaya Regency

Area
  - Total: 26.72 km^{2} (10.32 sq mi)

Population (mid 2024 estimate)
  - Total: 43,575
  - Density: 1,631/km^{2} (4,224/sq mi)
- Time zone: UTC+7 (IWST)
- Postal code: 46462
- Area code: (+62) 265
- Villages: 6

Mangunreja is an administrative district (kecamatan) of Tasikmalaya Regency in West Java Province of Indonesia. It is located west of Tasikmalaya city, and has a land area of 26.72 km^{2}. It had a population of 42,143 at the 2020 Census, and the official estimate as at mid 2024 was 43,575.

== Villages ==
The district is sub-divided into six rural villages (desa), all sharing the postcode of 46462, and listed below with their areas and populations as at mid 2024.

Kode Wilayah	Name of desa	Area in km^{2}	Population mid 2024 estimate
32.06.25.2005	Padirsalam	7.69	6,514
32.06.25.2006	Sukaluyu	4.08	5,565
32.06.25.2001	Sukasukur	4.02	7,564
32.06.25.2002	Salebu	3.84	6,463
32.06.25.2003	Mangunreja (village)	3.06	10,113
32.06.25.2004	Margajaya	4.03	7,396
32.06.25	Totals	26.72	43,575
