= Salawu =

Coordinates: 7°22′24″S 107°59′15″E

- District
- Interactive map of Salawu
- Country: Indonesia
- Province: West Java
- Regency: Tasikmalaya Regency

Area
  - Total: 70.27 km^{2} (27.13 sq mi)

Population
  - Total: 65,593
  - Density: 933.4/km^{2} (2,418/sq mi)
- Time zone: UTC+7 (IWST)
- Postal code: 46472
- Area code: (+62) 265
- Villages: 12

Salawu is an administrative district (kecamatan) of Tasikmalaya Regency in West Java Province of Indonesia. It is located west of Tasikmalaya city, and has a land area of 70.27 km^{2}. It had a population of 63,257 at the 2020 Census, and the official estimate as at mid 2024 was 65,533 (comprising 34,375 males and 33,136 females in 2024).

== Villages ==
The district is sub-divided into twelve rural villages (desa), all sharing the postcode of 46472, and listed below with their areas and populations as at mid 2024.

Kode Wilayah	Name of desa	Area in km^{2}	Population mid 2024 estimate
32.06.14.2009	Sukarasa	5.52	5,680
32.06.14.2001	Jahiang	6.60	4,888
32.06.14.2007	Sundawenang	6.32	5,800
32.06.14.2008	Kawungsari	12.40	6,449
32.06.14.2006	Tenjowaringin	7.28	6,873
32.06.14.2010	Kutawaringin	9.30	5,438
32.06.14.2005	Tanjungsari	6.72	7,186
32.06.14.2004	Neglasari	3.43	4,652
32.06.14.2011	Karangmukti	2.64	5,577
32.06.14.2003	Salawu (village)	3.76	5,183
32.06.14.2012	Margalaksana	2.77	5,269
32.06.14.2002	Serang	3.55	4,516
32.06.14	Totals	70.29	67,511
