= Sukarame =

- District
- Interactive map of Sukarame
- Coordinates: 7°21′36″S 108°08′02″E
- Country: Indonesia
- Province: West Java
- Regency: Tasikmalaya Regency

Area
  - Total: 16.48 km^{2} (6.36 sq mi)

Population (mid 2024 estimate)
  - Total: 44,473
  - Density: 2,699/km^{2} (6,989/sq mi)
- Time zone: UTC+7 (IWST)
- Postal code: 46472
- Area code: (+62) 265
- Villages: 12

Sukarame is an administrative district (kecamatan) of Tasikmalaya Regency in West Java Province of Indonesia. It is located west of Tasikmalaya city, and has a land area of 16.48 km^{2}. It had a population of 40,604 at the 2020 Census, and the official estimate as at mid 2024 was 44,473 (comprising 22,743 males and 21,730 females).

== Villages ==
The district is sub-divided into six rural villages (desa), all sharing the postcode of 46461, and listed below with their areas and populations as at mid 2024.

Kode Wilayah	Name of desa	Area in km^{2}	Population mid 2024 estimate
32.06.26.2005	Sukarapih	2.12	6,430
32.06.26.2006	Wargakerta	2.65	6,457
32.06.26.2002	Sukamenak	3.36	10,251
32.06.26.2004	Padasuka	2.74	5,145
32.06.26.2003	Sukakarsa	2.10	6,735
32.06.26.2001	Sukarame (village)	3.51	9,455
32.06.26	Totals	16.48	44,473
