= Singaparna =

- District

Regional transcription(s)
  - Sundanese: ᮞᮤᮍᮕᮁᮔ
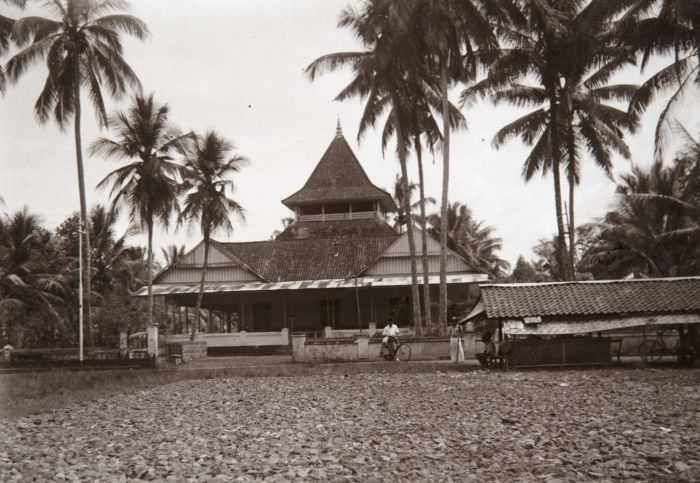
- Jami Mosque of Singaparna in early 20th century

- Location in Java and Indonesia Singaparna (Indonesia)
- Coordinates: 7°20′59″S 108°6′38″E
- Country: Indonesia
- Province: West Java
- Regency: Tasikmalaya Regency

Government
  - Camat: Kusnanto
  - Secretary: Mamat Rahmat

Area
  - Total: 20.11 km^{2} (7.76 sq mi)
- Elevation: 424 m (1,391 ft)

Population (mid 2024 estimate)
  - Total: 77,207
  - Density: 3,839/km^{2} (9,944/sq mi)
- Time zone: UTC+7 (IWST)
- Postal code: 46411 - 46418
- Area code: (+62) 265
- Villages: 10

Singaparna is an administrative district (kecamatan) which serves as the regency seat of Tasikmalaya Regency in West Java Province of Indonesia. it is located about 10 kms west of Tasikmalaya city. The total area of Singaparna district is around 2,011 hectares, which is divided into 10 administrative villages (desa). Most of the land in Singaparna is used for agriculture and habitation.

== Villages ==
The district centre is in the village of Singasari, and the district is sub-divided into ten rural villages (desa), all listed below with their areas and populations as at mid 2024, together with their postcodes.

Kode Wilayah	Name of desa	Area in km^{2}	Population mid 2024 estimate	Post code
32.06.24.2001	Cikunten	1.93	6,736	46414
32.06.24.2002	Singaparna (village)	0.81	9,033	46411
32.06.24.2003	Cipakat	1.71	8,714	46417
32.06.24.2004	Cintaraja	3.60	11,922	46417
32.06.24.2005	Cikunir	3.62	11,062	46418
32.06.24.2006	Cikadongdong	2.91	7,040	46418
32.06.24.2007	Sukaasih	1.32	5,404	46415
32.06.24.2008	Sukamulya	0.74	5,373	46415
32.06.24.2009	Singasari	1.02	7,599	46412
32.06.24.2010	Sukaherang	2.45	5,324	46413
32.06.24	Totals	20.11	77,207	

Cintaraka, Cikunir and Cikadongdong lie in the eastern half of the district, the other seven villages are in the western half. Singaparna has a tropical rainforest climate (Af) with heavy to very heavy rainfall year-round.

Climate data for Singaparna
Month	Jan	Feb	Mar	Apr	May	Jun	Jul	Aug	Sep	Oct	Nov	Dec	Year
Mean daily maximum °C (°F)	28.9 (84.0)	29.2 (84.6)	29.4 (84.9)	29.5 (85.1)	29.3 (84.7)	28.6 (83.5)	27.6 (81.7)	28.0 (82.4)	28.6 (83.5)	29.1 (84.4)	29.4 (84.9)	29.4 (84.9)	28.9 (84.1)
Daily mean °C (°F)	25.1 (77.2)	25.0 (77.0)	25.2 (77.4)	25.3 (77.5)	25.1 (77.2)	24.2 (75.6)	23.5 (74.3)	23.6 (74.5)	24.1 (75.4)	25.1 (77.2)	25.1 (77.2)	25.2 (77.4)	24.7 (76.5)
Mean daily minimum °C (°F)	21.3 (70.3)	20.9 (69.6)	21.1 (70.0)	21.2 (70.2)	21.0 (69.8)	19.9 (67.8)	19.5 (67.1)	19.3 (66.7)	19.7 (67.5)	20.8 (69.4)	21.2 (70.2)	21.3 (70.3)	20.6 (69.1)
Average rainfall mm (inches)	355 (14.0)	310 (12.2)	380 (15.0)	281 (11.1)	238 (9.4)	142 (5.6)	144 (5.7)	118 (4.6)	145 (5.7)	285 (11.2)	369 (14.5)	376 (14.8)	3,143 (123.8)
Source: Climate-Data.org
