= Tasikmalaya Regency =

Regency in West Java, Indonesia

Tasikmalaya Regency Kabupaten Tasikmalaya
- Regency

Other transcription(s)
  - Sundanese: ᮊᮘᮥᮕᮒᮦᮔ᮪ ᮒᮞᮤᮊ᮪ᮙᮜᮚ
- Coat of arms
- Nicknames: Pearl of the East Preanger; Beieren van Java (Bavaria of Java)
- Motto: Sukapura Ngadaun Ngora (Sukapura will a developed economy in Future)
- Location within West Java

- Location in Java and Indonesia Tasikmalaya Regency (Indonesia)
- Coordinates: 7°21′38″S 108°06′46″E
- Country: Indonesia
- Province: West Java
- Regency seat: Singaparna

Government
  - Regent: Ade Sugianto
  - Vice Regent: Cecep Nurul Yakin

Area
  - Total: 2,706.82 km^{2} (1,045.11 sq mi)
- Elevation: 430 m (1,410 ft)

Population (mid 2025 estimate)
  - Total: 1,946,197
  - Density: 718.998/km^{2} (1,862.20/sq mi)
- Time zone: UTC+7 (IWST)
- Area code: (+62) 265
- Website: tasikmalayakab.go.id

Tasikmalaya Regency (pronounced [taˈsɪkmalaja]; Indonesian: Kabupaten Tasikmalaya, Sundanese: ᮊᮘᮥᮕᮒᮦᮔ᮪ ᮒᮞᮤᮊ᮪ᮙᮜᮚ) is a regency (Indonesian: kabupaten, sub-provincial region) in the Indonesian province of West Java. With an area of 2,706.82 km^{2} (1,045 sq mi), it is the biggest and most important in the southeast region of East Preanger (Indonesian: Priangan Timur). Tasikmalaya Regency had a population of 1,687,776 at the 2010 census and 1,865,203 at the 2020 census; the mid 2025 official estimate was 1,946,197 (comprising 983,509 males and 962,688 females). The regency was previously administered from Tasikmalaya City; however, Tasikmalaya City and Tasikmalaya Regency now are administratively independent of each other, and the area and population listed above exclude the city. The administrative centre of the regency is now at Singaparna, west of the city.

Agricultural fields and forestry are the regency's dominant land uses. Most residents are farmers. Tasikmalaya is a major religious centre for West Java. The regency is known as the city of Muslim students (kota santri), with more than 800 traditional Islamic boarding schools (pesantren). Tasikmalaya is known for handicrafts (Indonesian: kerajinan anyaman) and salak (zalacca). The regency's most famous food is hot steamed rice mixed with oncom (nasi tutug oncom).

== History ==
=== Toponymy ===
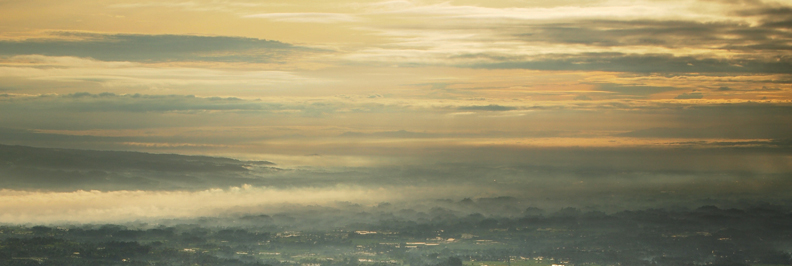
The Ten Thousand Hills, hummocky deposits from the eruption of Mount Galunggung

The origin of the name Tasikmalaya is uncertain. The word has no apparent meaning in local languages. Three possibilities have been proposed, all of which are combinations of Sundanese words: (1) the name may be a conflation of tasik and (ma)layah, literally "an ocean of hills"; (2) the source words may be tasik, jeung, and laya, meaning "large tracts of sand" (Sundanese: keusik ngalayah, Indonesian: hamparan pasir); (3) the name's original words may be Tasik (lake, sea), and Malaya (a chain of mountains or highlands), also meaning "an ocean of hills". The "ocean" or large area is presumed to begin at Sukapura, formerly called Tawang or Tawang-Galunggung. Tawang means paddy fields or literary "a wide range of an open space". The eruption of Mount Galunggung created mountains, hills, and mounds of scattered sand in the formerly open region of Sukapura.

=== Ancient origins ===
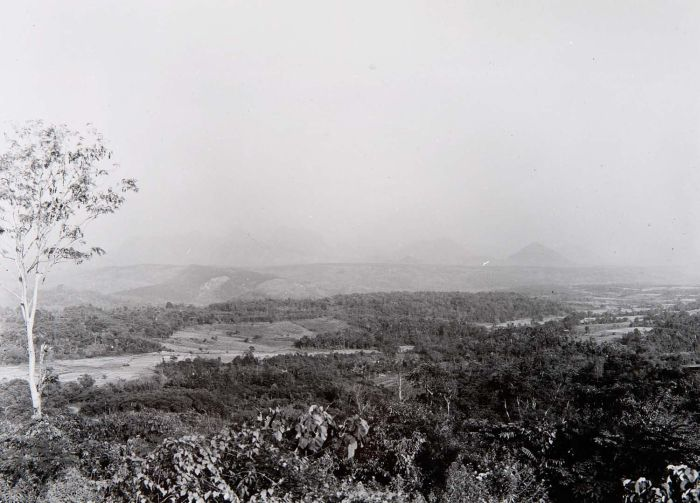
Photograph circa 1920–1935 showing a landscape of Tasikmalaya Regency in Neglasari, Salawu District.

In the 7th to 8th centuries, a realm with an unknown form of governance was centered near Mount Galunggung. The realm had the authority to designate the sovereigns of the Galuh Kingdom. Its rulers were Batara Semplakwaja, Batara Kuncung Putih, Batara Kawindu, Batara Wastuhayu, and finally Batari Hyang, who changed the form of governance into a monarchy (kingdom).

According to the Geger Hanjuang inscription, the Kingdom of Galunggung was established on 13th Bhadrapada 1033 Shaka (21 August 1111), and Queen Batari Hyang was its first ruler. Her famous teachings, known as Sang Hyang Siksakanda ng Kareksian, were still used as an official doctrine in the era of Prabu Siliwangi (1482–1521), the monarch of Pakuan Pajajaran. The Kingdom of Galunggung lasted for six more rulers, each in hereditary succession.

=== Modern ===
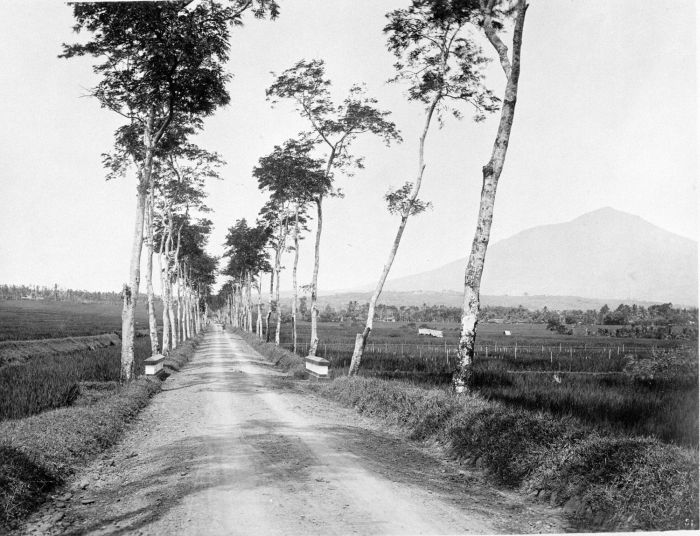
The road towards Tasikmalaya with Mount Galunggung in the distance (1920–1940)

At the start of the 16th century, a government in Sukakerta faced an opportunity to secede from its sovereign ruler, the Pajajaran Kingdom, which was ruled by Prabu Surawisesa (successor to Sri Baduga Maharaja Prabu Siliwangi). His kingdom faced a threat of expansion from the Banten Sultanate and Demak with the spread of Islam. As this expansion weakened the kingdom, its territories tried to break away.

In the early 17th century, three major forces (Mataram, Banten, and the VOC) were in conflict on the island of Java. After ten years of upheaval in the region of Priangan, the head of Sukakerta, Wirawangsa, was assigned as the Regent of Sukapura and honoured with a nobility name of Wiradadaha I by Sultan Agung of Mataram. Upon the promotion of its leader, the regency changed its name to Sukapura and the capital of the regency was moved from Dayeuh Tengah to Leuwiloa, Sukaraja.

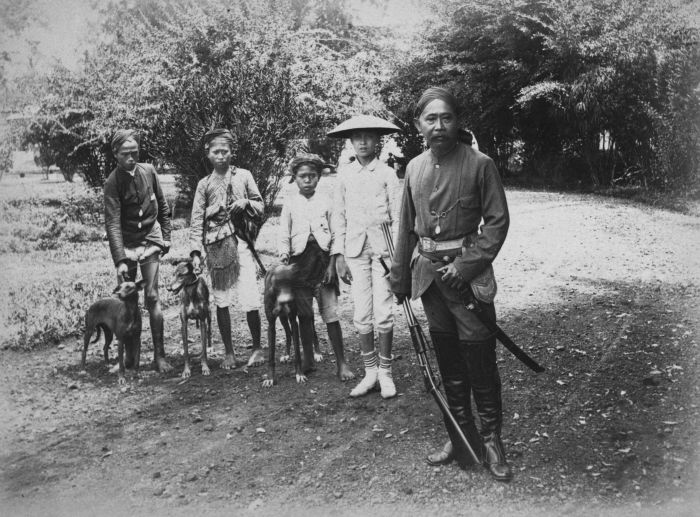
Raden Tumenggung Wirahadiningrat (1870–1900)

Years later, under the governance of Raden Tumenggung Surialaga (1813–14), the capital of the regency was brought to Tasikmalaya. In 1832, under the governance of Wiradadaha VIII, the capital was moved to Manonjaya, but after some consideration, particularly economically, it was switched back to Tasikmalaya. In 1913, the name of the regency, Sukapura, was changed to Tasikmalaya by the government regent R.A.A. Wiratanuningrat (1908–1937).

Based on the Geger Hanjuang inscription, the date of August 21 has been assigned as the date of Tasikmalaya regency's anniversary. The inscription, as it tells, was made to mark the establishment of the Kingdom of Galunggung and the inauguration of its first sovereign, Queen Batari Hyang, on 21 August 1111.

=== Government Regent history (1641 to 1937) ===
- 1641–1674: Raden Ngabehi Wirawangsa (Raden Tumenggung Wiradadaha I)
- 1674: Raden Jayamanggala (Raden Tumenggung Wiradadaha II)
- 1674–1723: Raden Anggadipa I (Raden Tumenggung Wiradadaha III)
- 1723–1745: Raden Subamanggala (Raden Tumenggung Wiradadaha IV)
- 1745–1747: Raden Secapati (Raden Tumenggung Wiradadaha V)
- 1747–1765: Raden Jaya Anggadireja (Raden Tumenggung Wiradadaha VI)
- 1765–1807: Raden Djayamanggala II (Raden Tumenggung Wiradadaha VII)
- 1807–1837: Raden Anggadipa II (Raden Tumenggung Wiradadaha VIII)
- 1837–1844: Raden Tumenggung Danudiningrat
- 1844–1855: Raden Tumenggung Wiratanubaya
- 1855–1875: Raden Tumenggung Wiraadegdana
- 1875–1901: Raden Tumenggung Wirahadiningrat
- 1901–1908: Raden Tumenggung Prawirahadingrat
- 1908–1937: Raden Tumenggung Wiratanuningrat

== Administrative districts ==
Tasikmalaya Regency is divided into 39 administrative districts (Indonesian: kecamatan, Sundanese: kacamatan), listed below with their areas and their populations at the 2010 Census and the 2020 Census, together with the official estimates as at mid 2025. The table also includes the locations of the district administrative centres, the number of administrative villages in each district (all 351 classed as rural desa), and their postcodes. The town of Singaparna (on the west side of Tasikmalaya City) is the administrative centre of the regency.

Districts of Tasikmalaya Regency
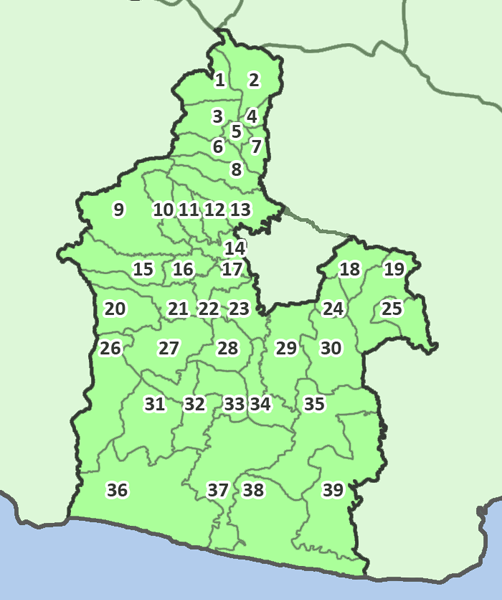
1. Kadipaten; 2. Pagerageung; 3. Ciawi; 4. Sukaresik; 5. Jamanis; 6. Sukahening; 7. Rajapolah; 8. Cisayong; 9. Cigalontang; 10. Sariwangi; 11. Leuwisari; 12. Padakembang; 13. Sukaratu; 14. Singaparna; 15. Salawu; 16. Mangunreja; 17. Sukarame; 18. Manonjaya; 19. Cineam	20. Taraju; 21. Puspahiang; 22. Tanjungjaya; 23. Sukaraja; 24. Gunungtanjung; 25. Karangjaya; 26. Bojonggambir; 27. Sodonghilir; 28. Parungponteng; 29. Jatiwaras; 30. Salopa; 31. Culamega; 32. Bantarkalong; 33. Bojongasih; 34. Cibalong; 35. Cikatomas; 36. Cipatujah; 37. Karangnunggal; 38. Cikalong; 39. Pancatengah

Districts of Taskimalaya Regency
No. on map	Kode Wilayah	Name of District (kecamatan)	Area in km^{2}	Pop'n 2010 census	Pop'n 2020 census	Pop'n mid 2025 estimate	Admin centre	No. of Villages	Post code
36	32.06.01	Cipatujah	241.99	62,858	70,904	74,433	Cipatujah	15	46187
37	32.06.02	Karangnunggal	153.26	80,935	88,586	91,650	Karangnunggal	14	46186
38	32.06.03	Cikalong ^{(a)}	160.88	61,181	67,803	70,571	Cikalong	13	46195
39	32.06.04	Pancatengah	162.11	44,618	49,375	51,355	Cibongas	11	46194
35	32.06.05	Cikatomas	142.21	47,729	52,513	54,466	Pakemitan	9	46193
34	32.06.06	Cibalong	61.74	30,483	32,826	33,695	Cibalong	6	46185
28	32.06.07	Parungponteng	50.50	33,472	36,792	38,143	Parungponteng	8	46189
32	32.06.08	Bantarkalong	64.15	34,245	37,803	39,272	Hegarwangi	8	46187 & 46188
33	32.06.09	Bojongasih	51.86	19,178	21,644	22,727	Bojongasih	6	46475
31	32.06.10	Culamega	86.29	22,913	26,684	28,448	Cintabodas	5	46188
26	32.06.11	Bojonggambir	126.82	38,341	43,766	46,209	Mangkonjaya	10	46476
27	32.06.12	Sodonghilir	101.53	62,580	70,249	73,573	Sodonghilir	12	46473
20	32.06.13	Taraju	62.99	37,357	41,505	43,252	Taraju	9	46474
21	32.06.15	Puspahiang	57.65	32,675	35,060	35,925	Puspahiang	8	46471
22	32.06.16	Tanjungjaya	39.11	42,336	46,235	47,782	Tanjungjaya	7	46184
23	32.06.17	Sukaraja	46.48	48,792	53,785	55,837	Sukapura	8	46183
30	32.06.18	Salopa	105.01	48,335	51,349	52,363	Mandalahayu	9	46192
29	32.06.19	Jatiwaras	89.06	47,827	52,600	54,546	Jatiwaras	11	46180
19	32.06.20	Cineam	74.13	33,288	33,852	33,799	Cijulang	10	46198
25	32.06.21	Karangjaya	45.98	12,374	12,520	12,470	Karangjaya	4	46199
18	32.06.22	Manonjaya	43.44	60,254	64,115	65,433	Manonjaya	12	46197
24	32.06.23	Gunungtanjung	47.78	27,567	31,225	32,845	Gunungtanjung	7	46418
	Subtotals	South and East sector	2,014.97	929,338	1,021,191	1,058,794		202	
15	32.06.14	Salawu	70.27	57,523	63,257	65,593	Salawu	12	46472
14	32.06.24	Singaparna	20.11	65,582	72,161	74,847	Singasari	10	46411: 46418
17	32.06.26	Sukarame	16.17	36,758	40,604	43,354	Sukarame	6	46461
16	32.06.25	Mangunreja	26.72	38,957	42,143	42,195	Mangunreja	6	46462
9	32.06.27	Cigalontang	145.67	67,668	75,834	79,358	Jayapura	16	46463
11	32.06.28	Leuwisari	31.17	36,492	40,854	42,731	Arjasari	7	46464
12	32.06.29	Padakembang	19.55	35,581	41,021	43,520	Cisaruni	5	46466
10	32.06.30	Sariwangi	38.55	30,309	35,268	37,584	Jayaratu	8	46465
13	32.06.31	Sukaratu	42.72	43,875	51,663	55,373	Sukaratu	8	46415
8	32.06.32	Cisayong	50.32	52,728	60,324	63,761	Cisayong	13	46153
6	32.06.33	Sukahening	28.91	29,373	30,869	31,314	Calincing	7	46155
7	32.06.34	Rajapolah	16.40	44,479	50,201	52,714	Rajapolah	8	46155 & 46183
5	32.06.35	Jamanis	15.98	32,251	36,955	39,090	Sindangraja	8	46175
3	32.06.36	Ciawi	44.58	57,593	65,538	69,093	Ciawi	11	46156
1	32.06.37	Kadipaten	43.05	32,761	39,454	42,750	Buniasih	6	46157
2	32.06.38	Pagerageung	64.30	51,223	58,514	61,803	Pagerageung	10	46158
4	32.06.39	Sukaresik	17.37	33,184	39,352	42,323	Sukaratu	8	46419
	Subtotals	Northwest sector	691.85	746,337	844,012	887,403		149	
	Totals for	Regency	2,706.82	1,675,675	1,865,203	1,946,197	Singaparna	351	

Notes: (a) Cikalong District includes two small offshore islands - Pulau Batukolotok and Pulau Nusamanuk.

== Geography ==
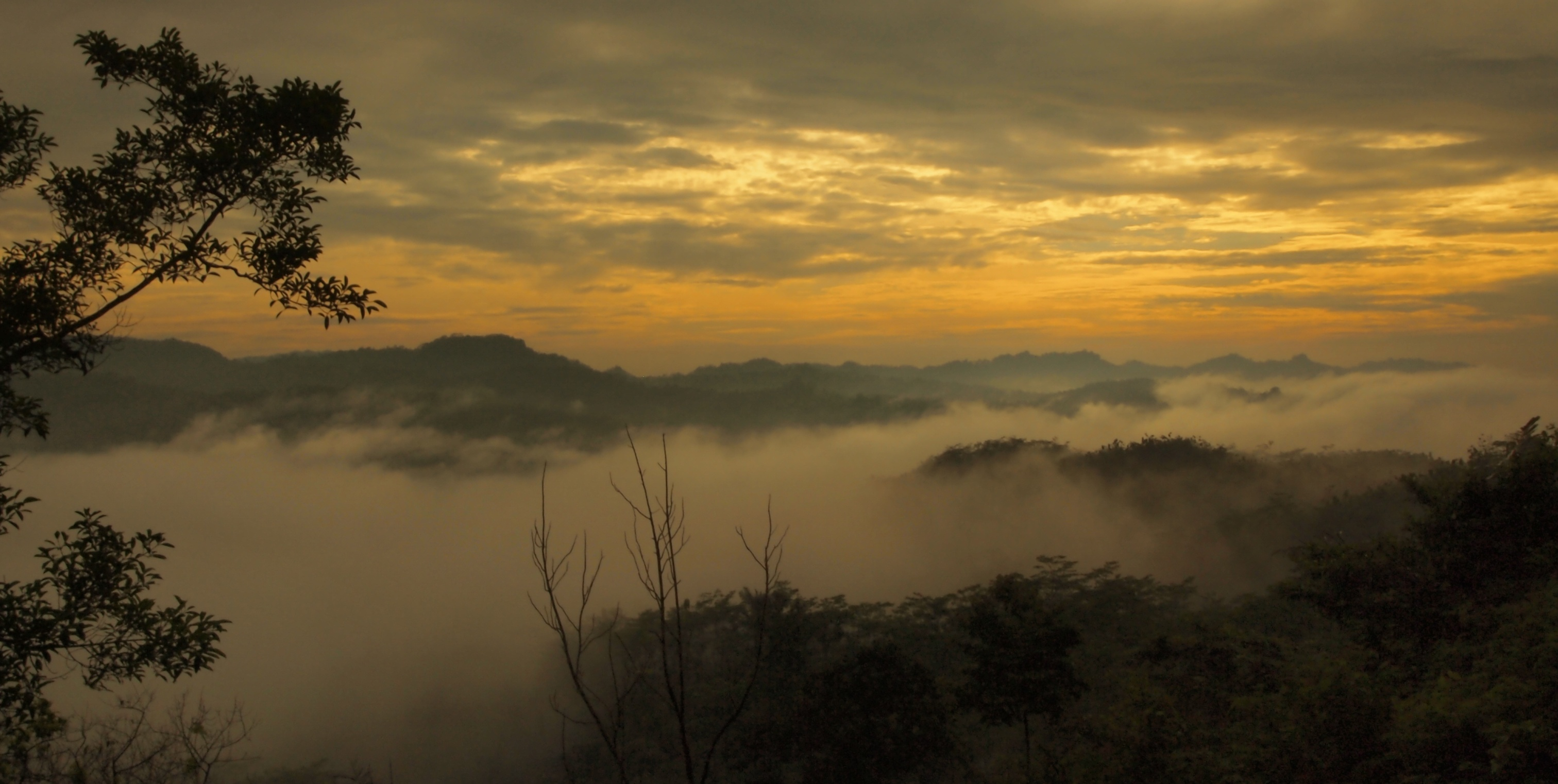
Rural area of Tasikmalaya Regency

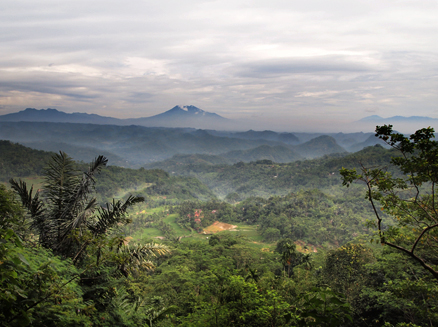
Tasikmalaya Regency's hilly terrain. Picture taken from Sodonghilir District.

The land of the regency is predominantly hilly, especially in the south. Some areas are mountainous, such as in the northwestern Galunggung highlands. Only 13% of the region is low-lying areas with an elevation between 0 and 200 metres. The average elevation is 200 to 500 metres. The highest point is the stratovolcanic Mount Galunggung, at 2,168 metres.

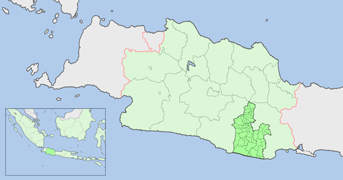
Map showing location of Tasikmalaya Regency, marked green, in West Java.

Like much of Java, Tasikmalaya Regency is traversed by volcanic chains, and the soil is naturally fertile. Water resources are abundant, as the region experiences heavy rainfall. The regency is also situated on a low-cavity mountainside, which increases the rainfall catchment area and water absorption area.

The area is known for producing silk goods printed with batik, paper umbrellas, and handbags woven by hand from bamboo and pandanus leaves. The production of handicrafts for domestic and international consumption is an important local industry; in 1998 and 1999, the export of handicrafts earned 2.6 billion rupiah for the region.

The regency was a major centre of early support and organization for Darul Islam, an Islamist group formed in 1948 to resist Dutch attempts to retake Java after World War II. After the Dutch were defeated, Darul Islam worked to establish a state in Indonesia governed by Islamic law.

=== Climate ===
Like the rest of Preanger's regencies, the climate of Tasikmalaya Regency is normally a tropical rainforest climate. It receives an average annual precipitation of 2.072 m. Although it experiences heavy rainfall the regency gets a considerable amount of heat. The average daily temperature of the regency is mildly varied, ranging from 20–34 °C (68–93 °F) in lowland areas and 18–22 °C (64–72 °F) in the upland areas.

=== Location ===
Following the excision of Tasikmalaya City, the residual Tasikmalaya Regency comprises an area of 2,708.82 km^{2}. It is bounded on the east by Garut Regency, marked by the Galunggung highlands, from southwest along to the northwest. Far to the north, the regency borders on Majalengka Regency and continues to the east with Ciamis Regency and Tasikmalaya City, the latter which it surrounds on three sides. Finally, to the south, Tasikmalaya Regency is bounded by the Indian Ocean. Tasikmalaya Regency's greatest distance from north to south is about 75 km, and about 56.25 km from east to west.

== Places of interest ==
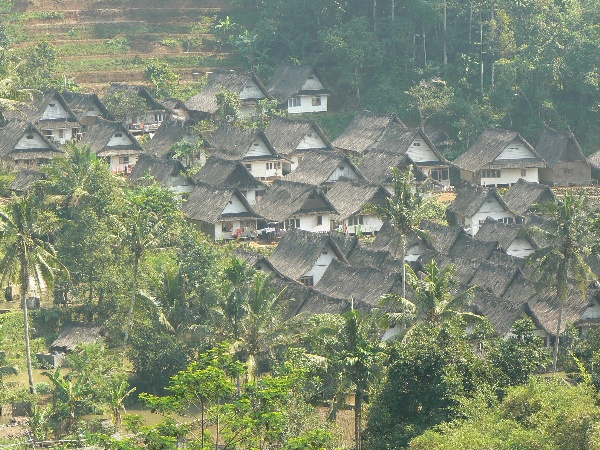
Kampung Naga, a well-known tourist destination in Tasikmalaya Regency

Tasikmalaya Regency is one of Indonesia's foremost tourist destinations. It has a number of accessible tourist attractions, even though many are located deep in the rural area of the regency. In the southern area, where the regency borders the Indian Ocean, tourist destinations are primarily along the coastline of the regency, which features caves and beaches. To the interior—where the land is mostly hilly and characterised by tropical rainforests—waterfalls, natural hot springs, and archaeological sites are the most visited attractions.

Among Tasikmalaya Regency's tourist destinations is Kampung Naga (Dragon Village), an idyllic traditional village where inhabitants have a strong ancient Sundanese tradition. Mount Galunggung's volcanic crater is scenic, featuring a lake surrounded by rainforests. A number of natural hot springs are issued nearby the mountain, adding to the regency's tourist destinations.

=== List of tourist destinations in Tasikmalaya Regency ===
There are more than 70 spots of tourist destinations in Tasikmalaya Regency, some of them are listed below.

- Ponpes Suryalaya
- Cakrabuana site
- Geger sunten site
- Cipacing hotspring
- Pamoyanan hotspring
- Rajapolah handicrafts' centre
- Citiis waterfall
- KH. Z. Mustofa grave
- Pamijahan sacred grave
- Manonjaya mosque
- Tanjungmalaya
- Cirahong bridge
- Gimbal and Cilangkap sites
- Kabuyutan Ngarantengah site
- Rd. A. Dewi Sartika grave
- Sukapura museum
- Batik of Sukaraja
- Baginjing grave
- Cigunung hotspring
- Bumi Rongsok site
- Cimanintin waterfall
- Rangga Wulung cave
- Cibalong hotspring
- Cupu Agung cave
- Hulu Kuya cave
- Malawang cave
- Arca and Wayang caves
- Nyai cave and Ciodeng cave
- Jasper Geopark
- Karangtawulan beach
- Cimanuk beach
- Sindangjaya beach
- Padabumi beach
- Kalaparea beach
- Sheikh Zaenudin sacred grave
- Garuda Ngupuk
- Parat cave and Lalay cave
- Cimaranggi cave
- Cipatujah beach
- Cipatujah hotspring
- Bubujung beach
- Joglo sacred grave
- Sarongge cave
- Ambu Hawuk cave
- Dengdeng waterfall
- Pamayang fisherman village
- Sidangkerta turtle conservation
- Sindangkerta/Taman Lengser beach
- Pamayangsari beach
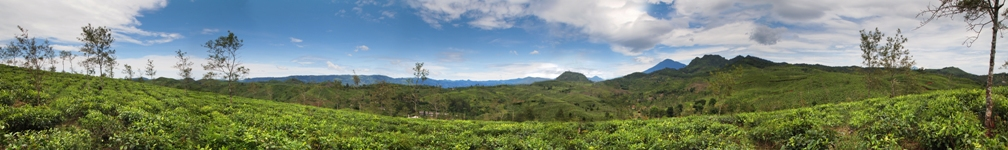
Taraju, one of Tasikmalaya Regency's tourist destinations

=== Jasper Geopark ===
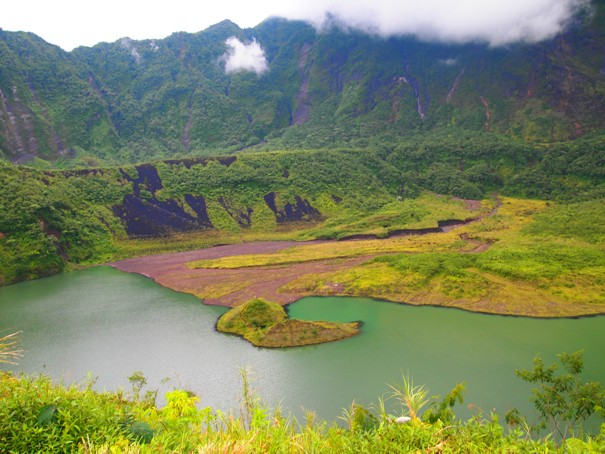
Mount Galunggung's volcanic crater

Pasirgintung village (in Cibuniasih subdistrict, Pancatengah district) is known for its numerous red jasper rocks; however, now only about 120 rocks remain. The administration will conserve it as Jasper Geopark.

== See also ==
- Largest cities in Indonesia
- Sundanese cuisine
- Districts of West Java
- Tasikmalaya City

== Notes ==
- Christomy, Tommy (1959), "Signs of the Wali: Narratives at the sacred sites in Pamijahan, West Java", 201, (Canberra, AU), 2008, ISBN 978-1-921313-69-1. Retrieved 6 January 2011.
- Permadi, Agus (September 1975), "Prasasti Geger Hanjuang; Ngahanjuang-siangkeun Hari Jadi Tasikmalaya", Mangle, 495, (Bandung, ID), 2009, cited in Miftahul Falah (August 21, 2009), "Etimologi Tasikmalaya", (in Indonesia). Retrieved 6 January 2011.
