= Banjar, Indonesia =

City in West Java, Indonesia

Banjar
- City
- City of Banjar; Kota Banjar

Other transcription(s)
  - Sundanese: ᮓᮚᮩᮂ ᮘᮔ᮪ᮏᮁ
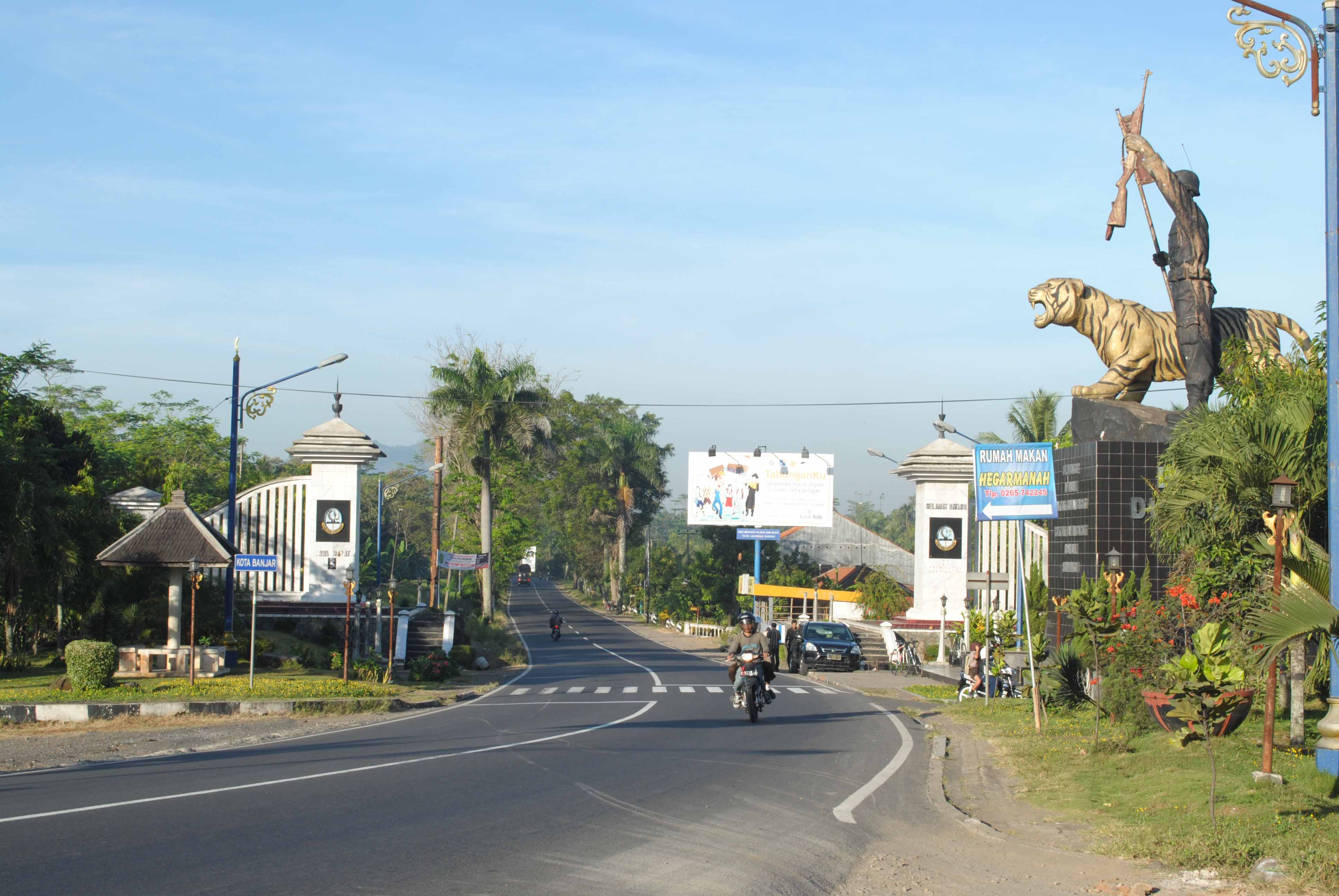
- Welcome sign

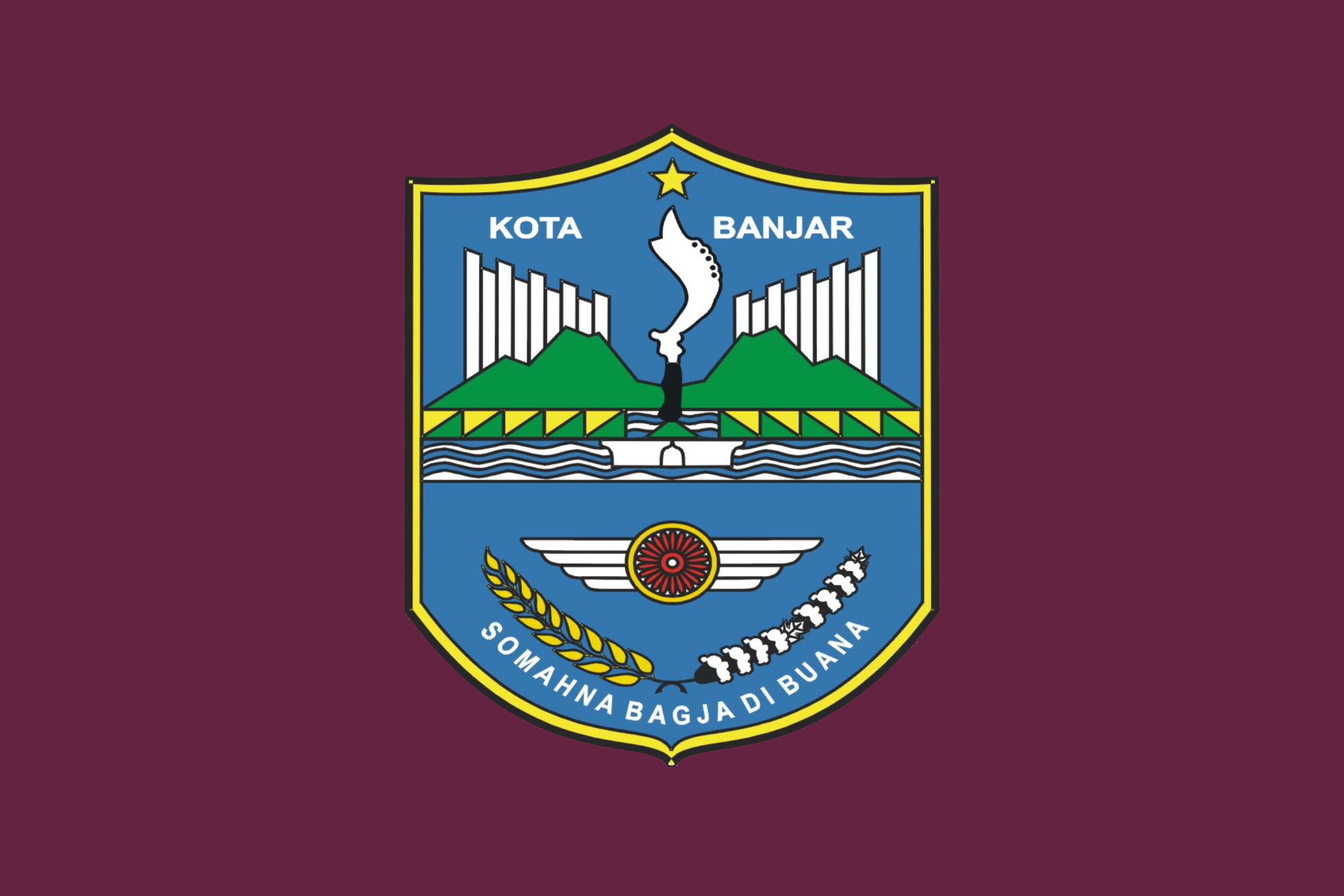
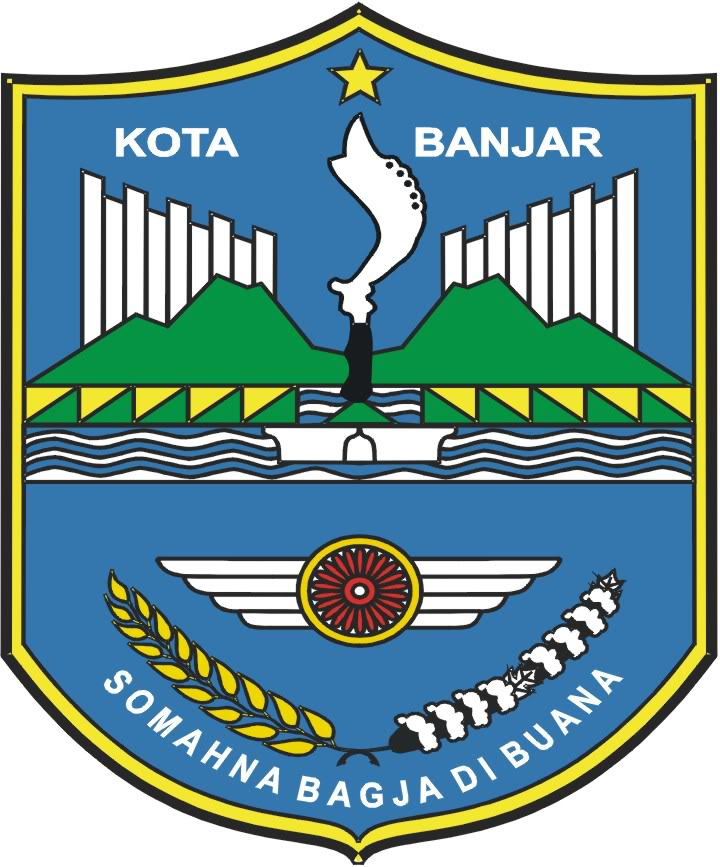
- Flag Coat of arms
- Motto: Somahna Bagja di Buana (Sundanese) ᮞᮧᮙᮂᮔ ᮘᮌ᮪ᮏ ᮓᮤ ᮘᮥᮃᮔ (Its people are happy in this world)
- Location within West Java

- Location in Java and Indonesia Banjar City (Indonesia)
- Coordinates: 7°22′10″S 108°32′29″E
- Country: Indonesia
- Province: West Java
- Established: 11 December 2002

Government
  - Mayor: Sudarsono
  - Vice Mayor: Supriana

Area
  - Total: 129.59 km^{2} (50.03 sq mi)
- Elevation: 97 m (318 ft)

Population (mid 2025 estimate)
  - Total: 211,964
  - Density: 1,635.7/km^{2} (4,236.3/sq mi)
- Time zone: UTC+7 (Indonesia Western Time)
- Area code: (+62) 265
- Website: banjarkota.go.id

Banjar (Sundanese: ᮘᮔ᮪ᮏᮁ), is a city located in the east of West Java, Indonesia, on the border between West Java and Central Java. It was originally administered as part of Ciamis Regency, which surrounds it (except on the northeast side, where there is a common boundary with Central Java province, along the Tanduy River), but was split off to become an independent city on 11 December 2002. It covers a land area of 129.59 km^{2}, and had a population of 175,157 at the 2010 Census and 200,970 at the 2020 Census; the official estimate as of mid 2025 was 211,964 (comprising 106,361 males and 105,603 females). This city is also known as Banjar Patroman or Pataruman.

== Administrative districts ==
The city of Banjar is divided into four administrative districts (Indonesian: kecamatan), tabulated below with their areas and their populations at the 2010 census and the 2020 census, together with the official estimate as at mid 2025. The table also includes the location of the district administrative centres, the number of administrative villages in each district (totaling 9 classed as urban kelurahan and 16 as rural desa), and its postal codes.

Kode Wilayah	Name of District (kecamatan)	Area in km^{2}	Pop'n census 2010	Pop'n census 2020	Pop'n estimate mid 2025	Admin centre	No. of villages	Post codes
32.79.01	Banjar	26.13	52,449	59,530	60,889	Balokang	7 ^{(a)}	46311 - 46315, 46317, 46321
32.79.03	Purwaharja	17.19	20,527	24,200	25,849	Puwaharja	4 ^{(b)}	46331 - 46334
32.79.02	Pataruman	54.07	54,286	61,320	64,172	Hegarsari	8 ^{(c)}	46316, 46322, 46323, 46326, 46327, 46335
32.79.04	Langensari	32.20	47,895	56,920	61,054	Langensari	6 ^{(d)}	46324, 46325, 46342 - 46344
	Total city	129.59	175,157	200,970	211,964	Karangpanimbal	25	

Notes: (a) comprising 3 kelurahan (Banjar, Mekarsari and Situbatu) and 4 desa. (b) comprising 2 kelurahan (Karangpanimbal and Purwaharja) and 2 desa.
(c) comprising 2 kelurahan (Hegarsari and Pataruman) and 6 desa. (d) comprising 2 kelurahan (Bojongkantong and Muktisari) and 4 desa.

== Transportation ==
=== Rail transport ===
The currently non-operational train service between Banjar and Cijulang, with a length of 82.385 kilometers, gives a panorama along the track, including hills and a view of the sea from above Pangandaran. The track has several old stations with class I, II, and III categories, and has three tunnels (one of them, the Wilhemina tunnel, with a length of 1,116 metres, is the longest tunnel in Indonesia); it is also the longest (Cikacepit) bridge in Indonesia, with a length of 1,250 metres and a height of 100 metres above the ground. The rail authority has announced its intention to re-activate the train service and will restore Pangandaran and Cijulang stations while still keeping their original features.

== Climate ==
Banjar has a tropical rainforest climate (Köppen Af) with heavy to very heavy rainfall year-round.

Climate data for Banjar
Month	Jan	Feb	Mar	Apr	May	Jun	Jul	Aug	Sep	Oct	Nov	Dec	Year
Mean daily maximum °C (°F)	31.0 (87.8)	31.2 (88.2)	31.4 (88.5)	31.5 (88.7)	31.4 (88.5)	30.8 (87.4)	29.9 (85.8)	30.1 (86.2)	30.7 (87.3)	31.4 (88.5)	31.3 (88.3)	31.2 (88.2)	31.0 (87.8)
Daily mean °C (°F)	27.2 (81.0)	27.1 (80.8)	27.3 (81.1)	27.4 (81.3)	27.4 (81.3)	26.6 (79.9)	26.0 (78.8)	26.0 (78.8)	26.5 (79.7)	27.1 (80.8)	27.3 (81.1)	27.3 (81.1)	26.9 (80.5)
Mean daily minimum °C (°F)	23.4 (74.1)	23.1 (73.6)	23.3 (73.9)	23.4 (74.1)	23.4 (74.1)	22.5 (72.5)	22.1 (71.8)	21.9 (71.4)	22.3 (72.1)	22.9 (73.2)	23.4 (74.1)	23.4 (74.1)	22.9 (73.3)
Average rainfall mm (inches)	412 (16.2)	353 (13.9)	335 (13.2)	267 (10.5)	206 (8.1)	118 (4.6)	144 (5.7)	104 (4.1)	131 (5.2)	204 (8.0)	261 (10.3)	343 (13.5)	2,878 (113.3)
Source: Climate-Data.org
