= Ciamis Regency =

Regency in West Java, Indonesia

Ciamis Regency Kabupaten Ciamis Galuh
- Regency

Other transcription(s)
  - Sundanese: ᮊᮘᮥᮕᮒᮦᮔ᮪ ᮎᮤᮃᮙᮤᮞ᮪
- Coat of arms
- Motto: ᮙᮠᮚᮥᮔ ᮃᮚᮥᮔ ᮊᮓᮒ᮪ᮝᮔ᮪ Mahayuna Ayuna Kadatuan (Sundanese) (meaning: Face Development, Regional Happiness)
- Location within West Java

- Location in Java and Indonesia Ciamis Regency (Indonesia)
- Coordinates: 7°19′36″S 108°21′07″E
- Country: Indonesia
- Province: West Java

Government
  - Regent: Herdiat Sunarya
  - Vice Regent: Vacant

Area
  - Total: 1,595.94 km^{2} (616.20 sq mi)

Population (mid 2025 estimate)
  - Total: 1,273,158
  - Density: 797.748/km^{2} (2,066.16/sq mi)
- Time zone: UTC+7 (Indonesia Western Time)
- Area code: (+62) 265
- Website: ciamiskab.go.id

Ciamis Regency (Kabupaten Ciamis) is a landlocked regency in West Java, Indonesia, and shares a provincial border with Central Java. Its seat is the town of Ciamis, also the primary urban center. Formerly, the regency included the town of Banjar, which was separated out to become an independent city on 11 December 2002; it also included areas bordering the Indian Ocean, but these southern districts were cut off to form a separate Pangandaran Regency on 25 October 2012. The regency now covers 1,595.94 km^{2}, and had a 2020 census population of 1,229,069, but the official estimate as of mid 2025 was 1,273,158 (comprising 635,483 males and 637,675 females).

== History ==
=== Vassal state of Mataram ===
Second incarnation of Galuh Kingdom reemerged in 16th century centered in Panaekan. In 1595, under Cipta Permana reign, the kingdom was conquered by Mataram Sultanate. In 1595, appointment of Adipati Panaekan, Cipta Permana's son, as wedana by the Mataram administration marked the region's new status as a subordinate territory of the Mataram Sultanate.

Adipati Panaekan moved the administrative center to Gara Tengah. He was then killed in 1625 by his brother-in-law, Adipati Kertabumi, after a dispute over strategy for attacking the VOC. Panaekan favored an immediate assault, whereas Kertabumi argued for consolidating forces first. Kertabumi then informed Sultan Agung—falsely—that Panaekan had conspired with Adipati Ukur to detach Ukur from the Mataram realm. Panaekan was replaced by his son, who bore the title Adipati Imbanagara.

Imbanagara himself was killed in 1636 by Mataram troops due to a misunderstanding. A figure named Patih Wiranangga attempted to claim succession by concealing the legitimate letter of appointment for the new ruler. When this was discovered, he was executed. The next ruler was Imbanagara's son, who received the title Adipati Panji Aria Jayanegara. He was installed on 5 Rabiul Awal, corresponding to 6 August 1636. Under his rule, Galuh was renamed Galuh Imbanagara.

Jayanagara moved the administrative center from Gara Tengah to Barunay. In 1641, the territory of Galuh Imbanagara was reduced after the areas of Bojong Lopang, Utama, Kawasen, and Banyumas were separated to form a new regency.

=== Under VOC and Dutch East Indies ===
Under the agreement of 19–20 October 1677, Galuh, together with Limbangan, Sukapura, and Cirebon, was incorporated into the territories transferred by Mataram to the VOC. The ruler of Galuh at the time, R. Anggapraja—the eldest son of Jayanagara—refused to cooperate with the VOC, resulting in the leadership being passed to his younger brother, R. A. Angganaya. At that time, the population of Galuh was recorded at 708 inhabitants.

Leadership subsequently passed to R. A. Sutadinata in 1693. He became the first regent to serve under VOC authority, following the formalization of Galuh's status under the VOC in the agreement of 5 October 1705, granted as compensation for the VOC's support of Prince Puger in claiming the throne from Amangkurat III. During Sutadinata's administration, the VOC implemented the Prianganstelsel and an indirect rule system.

VOC records list Galuh's population as 1,333 in 1684, 398 in 1686, and 1,700 in 1706.

In 1706, R. A. Kusumadinata I succeeded his father, Sutadinata. During this period, the VOC appointed Prince Aria of Cirebon as an opziener (overseer). Coffee cultivation began in the Kawali area in 1720.

Kusumadinata II succeeded his father, Kusumadinata I, in 1727. He died young and left no heirs, resulting in the regency passing to his sister's son, R. A. Kusumadinata III. In fact, Kusumadinata II had two younger brothers, Danumaya and Danukriya, but they were not recognized by the VOC because they were born to a different mother.

At the beginning of Kusumadinata III's tenure, his rule was exercised through three guardians—essentially a supervisory council—led by R. T. Jagabaya. During this interim leadership, unrest occurred in the Ciancang area, prompting the VOC to transfer that territory into Galuh Imbanagara. Kusumadinata III began to govern directly in 1751.

R. A. Natadikusuma succeeded his father, Kusumadinata III, in 1801. He was dismissed from office after being accused of insulting the Dutch official Van Bast and, in 1806, replaced by R. T. Surapraja, who was not a descendant of Natadikusuma. He was even detained in Cirebon. As a consequence of the incident, Banyumas and Dayeuhluhur were removed from Galuh's jurisdiction, although Utama and Cibatu were added. Around this period, the name Galuh Imbanagara was formally reverted to Galuh.

In 1811, R. T. Jayengpati Kartanagara from Cirebon became regent. During his administration, Galuh Regency was required to pay a debt of 23,000 rds. He moved administrative center to Cibatu.

Jayengpati was succeeded by Natanagara in 1812. Natanagara proposed relocating the administrative center to Randengan, but the colonial government rejected the plan. He was dismissed in the same year and replaced by Sutawijaya of Cirebon after failing to suppress an uprising in Nusa Kambangan.

Sutawijaya was assisted by three patih: Wiradikusuma, who oversaw Imbanagara; Jayakusuma, responsible for Cibatu; and Wiratmaka, who managed Utama. He later moved the capital to Burung Diuk, a location closer to Dayeuh Anyar, an area then being developed as the next administrative center.

After Sutawijaya returned to Cirebon, he was succeeded by Wiradikusuma in 1815. Wiradikusuma again relocated the capital, this time to Ciamis. In 1819 he requested retirement and was replaced by R. A. Adikusuma.

During Adikusuma's administration, Kawali and Panjalu were incorporated into Galuh. The regency was reorganized into four districts: Ciamis, Kepel, Kawali, and Panjalu. His tenure also coincided with the implementation of the cultuurstelsel, under which the mandatory crops included coffee, rice, sugarcane, and tarum (indigo).

R. A. A. Kusumadiningrat succeeded Adikusuma in 1839. His administration oversaw the construction of several dams in Nagawangi, Wangundireja, Cikatomas, and Nagawiru, as well as the establishment coconut oil mill and coffee-processing facility. Masjid Agung Galuh (Great Mosque of Galuh) was also built during his tenure. He additionally secure approval from the colonial government for a railway line to pass through Ciamis. In his administration, several formal schools called sakola kabupaten (regency school) were established. These schools initially were reserved for the family of regent and regency officials, but over time they were opened to the general public.

R. A. A. Kusumasubrata, son of Kusumadiningrat, succeeded him in 1886. He received formal schooling in addition to traditional Islamic pesantren education as preparation for his future post. None of his descendants later held the regent position as they were known for opposing the Dutch colonial rule, including his son R. Otto Gurnita Kusumasubrata.

Kusumasubrata was succeeded by R. A. A. Sastrawinata in 1914. During his tenure, the name Galuh Regency was officially changed to Ciamis Regency in 1916. In 1926, Ciamis, Garut, and Tasikmalaya regencies were consolidated into the Priangan Timur (Eastern Priangan) afdeeling. His period in office also saw a local communist uprising in Ciamis, which was successfully suppressed, as well as the conversion of marshland into rice fields in Cisaga.

== Recent changes ==
Prior to the separation of part of this regency in 2012, it had an area of 2,556.75 km^{2} and population of 1,528,306 (at the 2010 census); the regency was until 2012 divided into 36 districts. However, as from 25 October 2012, the existing regency has been split, with 10 districts comprising the southern portion being formed into a new Pangandaran Regency in the extreme southeast of the province (with a 2010 census population of 383,848), leaving 26 districts in the residual Ciamis Regency. The reduced Ciamis Regency covers 1,595.94 km^{2} and the districts comprising it had a population of 1,148,656 at the 2010 census, which rose to 1,229,069 at the 2020 census and to an official estimate of 1,273,158 as at mid 2025.

== Tourist destinations ==
In 2011 Ciamis Regency was boosting the (new) tourist destinations with an idea of making a new Regency in the southern 10 districts of the regency, where there were already several tourist destinations (e.g. Pangandaran Beach). The separate Pangandaran Regency was split off in 2012.

In the five months up to end of May 2014, Ciamis Regency was only visited by 156,423 domestic tourists and just 3 foreign tourists as a spill-off from Pangandaran Beach. The low count was a significant drop compared to when Pangandaran was still part of Ciamis Regency, because Ciamis Regency until now has not yet arranged affordable tourist sites, mainly for foreign tourists.

A number of artistic and tourist attractions are located in the town of Ciamis.

== Administrative districts ==
Prior to the separation of Pangandaran Regency as a separate regency, there were 36 districts (kecamatan) within Ciamis Regency. Six of these districts (Baregbeg, Lumbung, Mangunjaya, Purwadadi, Sindangkasih and Sukamantri) had been created between the censuses of 2000 and 2010.

Following the separation of ten districts (Cigugur, Cijulang, Cimerak, Kalipucang, Langkaplancar, Mangunjaya, Padaherang, Pangandaran, Parigi and Sidamulih) to form the new Pangandaran Regency, the remaining Ciamis Regency was divided into 26 districts (kecamatan), but an additional district (Banjaranyar) was subsequently created by splitting of Banjarsari District. The 27 districts are tabulated below with their areas and their 2010 and 2020 census populations, together with the official estimates as of mid 2025. Every district is named after the town which is its administrative centre. The table also includes the number of villages in each district (totaling 258 rural desa and 7 urban kelurahan - the latter all in Ciamis Town District), and its post code.

The first seven of the districts listed below, with a combined area of 483.46 km^{2} and 315,420 inhabitants in mid 2024, lie to the south and west of Banjar city, whose area (not being administered by the regency) nearly separates these southern districts geographically from the rest of the regency to the north.

Kode Wilayah	Name of District (kecamatan)	Area in km^{2}	Pop'n census 2010	Pop'n census 2020	Pop'n estimate mid 2025	No. of villages	Post code
32.07.18	Banjarsari	58.01	102,848	68,974	70,802	12	46383
32.07.37	Banjaranyar	109.85	^{(a)}	39,380	40,424	10	46384
32.07.17	Lakbok	57.63	48,381	54,706	58,111	10	46385
32.07.35	Purwadidi	50.90	35,147	38,935	40.950	9	46380
32.07.19	Pamarican	124.32	64,057	67,416	69,168	14	46361: 46382
32.07.05	Cidolog	56.32	18,745	19,293	19,582	6	46352
32.07.29	Cimaragas	26.43	15,460	16,066	16,383	5	46381
Sub-totals for	Southern group	483.46	284,638	304,770	315,420	66	
32.07.03	Cijeungjing	60.67	50,103	53,065	54,611	11	46271
32.07.30	Cisaga	80.07	36,455	37,365	37,849	11	46386
32.07.16	Tambaksari	60.26	21,587	20,775	21,144	6	46388
32.07.15	Rancah	86.61	55,646	56,123	57,120	13	46387
32.07.13	Rajadesa	61.59	48,391	52,526	54,703	11	46254
32.07.14	Sukadana	57.89	22,727	22,923	23,040	6	46272
32.07.01	Ciamis (town)	33.80	93,744	98,610	101,147	12	46211: 46219
32.07.32	Baregbeg	38.24	40,556	43,811	45,521	9	46274
32.07.02	Cikoneng	47.06	49,852	54,978	57,698	9	46261
32.07.31	Sindangkasih	29.85	44,745	51,038	54,444	9	46268
32.07.06	Cihaurbeuti	64.06	46,815	50,663	52,686	11	46262
32.07.04	Sadananya	46.17	33,527	37,906	40,263	8	46256
32.07.11	Cipaku	78.56	58,649	65,991	69,932	13	46252
32.07.12	Jatinagara	34.12	26,047	27,588	28,392	6	46273
32.07.10	Panawangan	82.26	47,614	50,510	52,022	18	46255
32.07.09	Kawali	36.23	39,027	41,840	43,313	11	46253
32.07.34	Lumbung	27.87	28,335	29,857	30,651	8	46258
32.07.08	Panjalu	73.49	43,391	45,841	47,119	8	46264
32.07.33	Sukamantri	50.55	20,942	22,687	23,605	5	46265
32.07.07	Panumbangan	63.13	55,865	60,202	62,478	14	46263
	Totals for Regency	1,595.94	1,148,656	1,229,069	1,273,158	265	

Note: (a) the population of what is now Banjaranyar District in 2010 was included with the figure for Banjarsari District, from which it was subsequently separated.

== Gallery ==
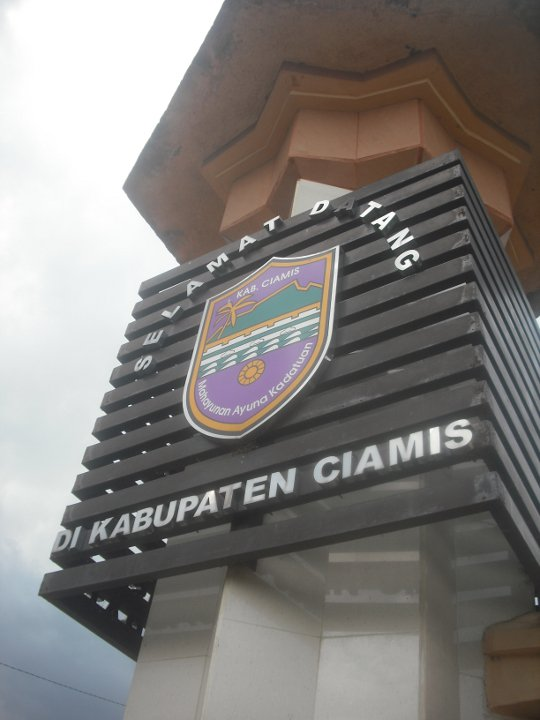
Coat of arms of the regency in a boundary monument

== Works cited ==
- Sofiani, Yulia (2012). R.A.A. Kusumadiningrat & R.A.A. Kusumasubrata: Gaya Hidup Bupati-bupati Galuh, 1839-1914 (in Indonesian). Yogyakarta: Ombak. p. 141. ISBN 978-602-7544-27-7.
