= Indonesian National Route 1 =

Road in Indonesia

Nasional 1

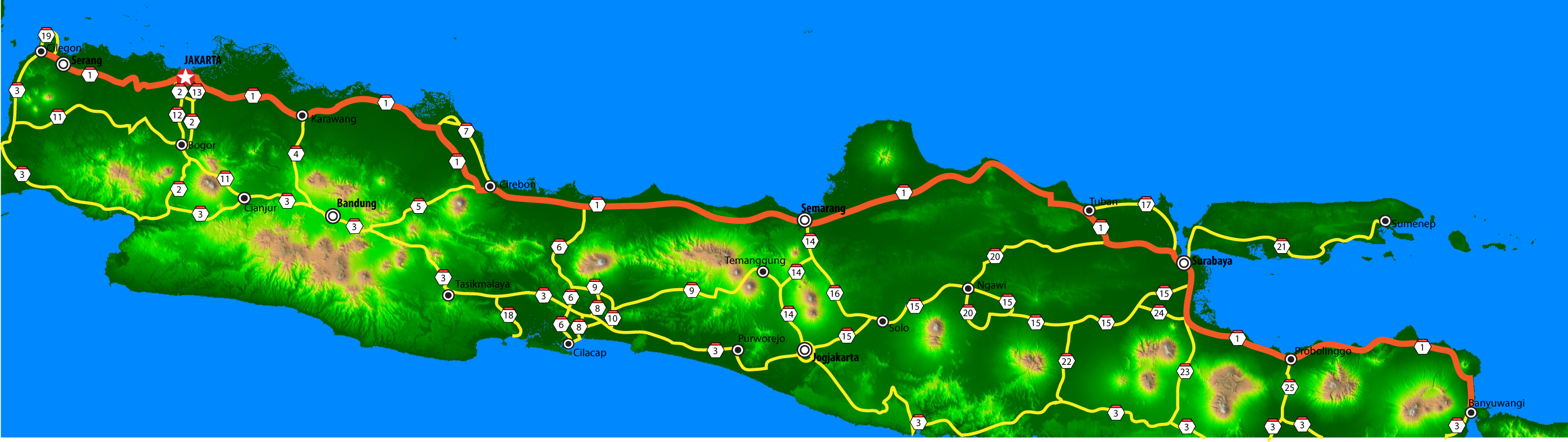

Route information
- Part of AH2
- Length: 1,316 km (818 mi)

Major junctions
- West end: Merak
- National 2 National 3 National 4 National 5 National 6 National 7 National 13; National 14; National 15; National 17; National 19; National 20; National 23; National 24; National 25
- East end: Ketapang

Location
- Country: Indonesia

Highway system
- Transport in Indonesia
← National 25	→ National 2

Indonesian National Route 1 is a major road in Java, Indonesia. It passes through 5 provinces along the north coast, Banten, Jakarta, West Java, Central Java and East Java. It connects Merak and Ketapang. Merak is a ferry terminal to Sumatra and Ketapang is ferry terminal to Bali. This national route is also called "Pantura" (an abbreviation of "Pantai Utara"/North Coast) or "Trans-Java". Besides the arterial roads, the route also includes the entirety of the Trans-Java Toll Road.

== Route ==
Merak – Cilegon – Serang – Tangerang – Jakarta – Bekasi – Tambun – Cikarang – Karawang – Klari – Kosambi – Dawuan – Cikampek – Sukamandi – Pamanukan – Kandanghaur – Lohbener – Jatibarang – Palimanan – Weru – Cirebon – Losari – Pejagan – Brebes – Tegal – Pemalang – Pekalongan – Batang – Weleri – Kendal – Semarang – Demak – Trengguli – Kudus – Pati – Rembang – Bulu – Tuban – Widang – Babat – Lamongan – Gresik – Surabaya – Waru – Sidoarjo – Porong – Gempol – Bangil – Pasuruan – Nguling – Probolinggo – Paiton – Besuki – Panarukan – Situbondo – Bajulmati – Ketapang

=== Description ===
==== Banten ====
Route 1 starts on the confluence of Route 19 and Jalan Raya Merak (an entry to Merak Ferry Terminal, also the last railway crossing of Tanah Abang-Merak railway line). The route runs southeastwardsly until an intersection with Jl. Alternatif Tol Merak Atas (Upper Merak Toll Alternative Road). After that, the route mostly goes in southward direction for 2.8 km inside Cilegon Industrial Zone before reaching a railway crossing with Western Railway Line. Eight kilometers later, Route 3 from Labuan merges with Route 1 in Downtown Cilegon. From here, the segment of Great Post Road built by Herman Willem Daendels in Route 1 begins. Route 1 then runs for 5 km before reaching an intersection with Route 19 from Bojonegara and Southern Ring Road. In that segment, the route crosses over the railroad with flyover in village of Cipucang.

The route then enters Serang Regency and stretching not until 6 km in southeast direction before reaching the western limit of Serang City, provincial capital of Banten. The streets in Serang designated as Route 1 are: Jl. Mayor Syafei, Jl. Tirtayasa, Jl. Maulana Yusuf, Jl. A. Yani, and Jl. Sudirman. In Serang City segment of Route 1, there are two intersection leading to Tangerang–Merak Toll Road: Serang Barat and Serang Timur and a level crossing in village of Sumurpecung.

After 14 km running in Serang City in west–east direction, Route 1 eventually goes into Serang Regency again. Continuing 5 km east, it intersects with Ciujung Toll Plaza. After crossing Ciujung River, it turns southeastwards until Cikande, then it is aligned eastwards again. A bridge over Cikande River marks the end of Serang Regency segment, and Route 1 enters Tangerang Regency.

The route's Tangerang Regency section mostly runs eastwards for 7.5 km before three-way intersection at Cisoka. From here, the route moves northeastwards for 5.5 km leading for Balaraja. An interchange with Balaraja Barat Toll Plaza exists in this section. After a three-way intersection in Balaraja, it goes eastwards for 500 m, and then southeastwards for 8 km before reaching Cikupa. There are many industrial area between Balaraja-Cikupa. The route then moves northwards for 1 km and eastwards for 3.5 km. After the intersection with Bitung Toll Plaza, the route runs northwards. Some 2 km later, the route encounters the southern limit of Tangerang City.

Route 1 then follows southwest-northeast direction for 3 km, and then the route turns eastwards for 3 km. In Tangerang City, the streets designated as Route 1 are: Jl. Raya Serang, Jl. Gatot Subroto, Jl. Merdeka, and Jl. Daan Mogot. In Pabuaran, the routes goes northeast again for 1.5 km, until reaching Cisadane River. After the river, Route 1 is divided. The eastbound section follows Jl. Benteng Jaya, running parallel with Cisadane River, and the westbound section follows Jl. Daan Mogot. Jl. Benteng Jaya then merges with Jl. Daan Mogot and runs eastwards, parallel with Mookervaart Canal. 2.7 km later, the route crosses the Mookervaart, and the Banten section of Route 1 ends 3 km later.

==== Jakarta ====
When entering West Jakarta, Route 1 still runs eastwards and parallel with the Mookervaart. 3.5 km east of Banten-Jakarta border, the route interchanges with JORR West 1. The route continues 6.5 km eastwards, crossing over Cengkareng Drain, Angke River, and Western railway line. In Grogol, it has an interchange with Jakarta Inner Ring Road (Pluit-Tomang section). From here, Route 1 turns northwards, following Jl. Satria Raya and then Jl. Dr. Latumeten parallel with, marking its divergence with the old Great Post Road continuing eastwards as Jl. Kyai Tapa. Route 1 also intersects with Route 2 running southwards as Jl. LetJend. S. Parman. After crossing over Grogol River, Jl. Dr. Latumeten converges with Jl. Dr. Makaliwe and then Jl. Dr. Latumeten goes across Ciliwung River.

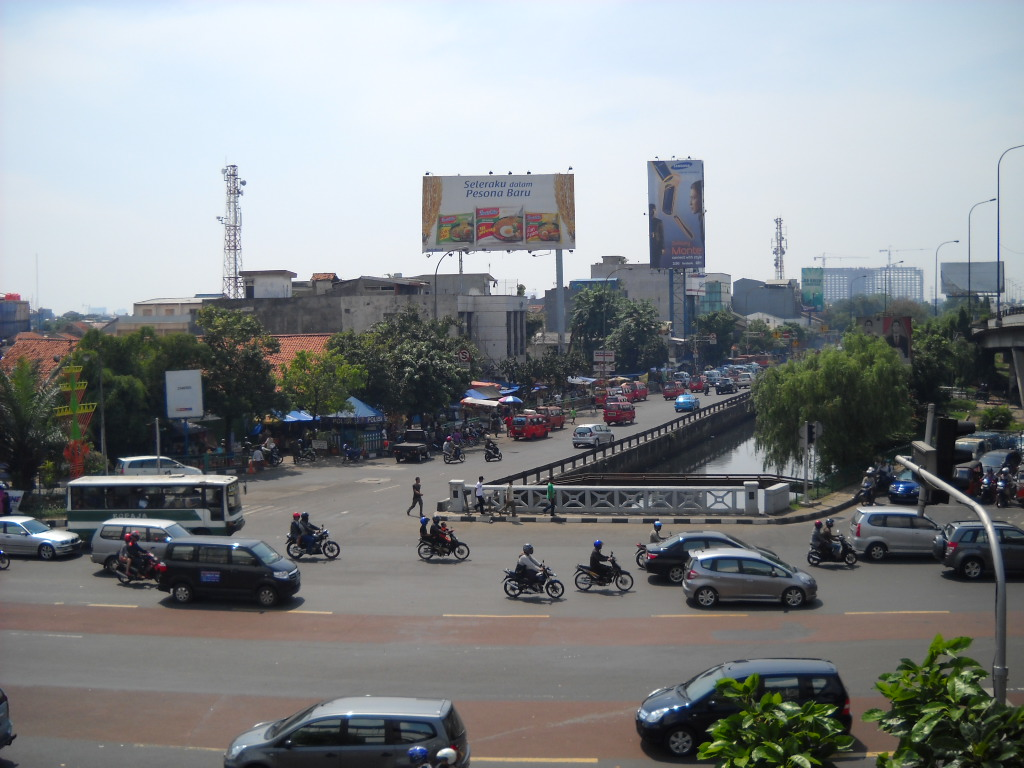
Route 1 in Grogol Interchange.

An intersection with Jl. Pangeran Tubagus Angke marks the entrance of Route 1 into North Jakarta approximately one kilometer after crossing Ciliwung. The route then goes northward for 1 km as Jl. Jembatan Dua and then Jl. Jembatan Tiga before entering an intersection with Harbour Toll Road in Jembatan Tiga. Continuing 750 m north, it turns eastwards as Jl. Pluit Selatan Raya for 1.3 km after reaching a junction near Atma Jaya Catholic University of Indonesia. The route then enters the Old City, running concurrently with Jl. Gedong Panjang, Jl. Pakin, and Jl. Kerapu. After leaving Sunda Kelapa, Route 1 runs eastwards for 10 km as Jl. Lodan Raya, Jl. RE. Martadinata, Jl. Taman Stasiun Priok, and Jl. Enggano. In Jl. RE. Martadinata, the route runs parallel with Harbour Toll Road, Ancol River, and Inner City Railway Line (Jakarta Kota to Tanjung Priok segment). It passes near Tanjung Priok Port. After Tugu Junction, it runs southwards for 6.5 km as Jl. Laks. Yos Sudarso, parallel with Sunter River. Wiyoto–Wiyono Toll Road lies above the route between Sungai Bambu and Pulomas. Along this segment, there are 2 access entering for the toll road. Route 1 intersects with Route 13 and Jl. Suprapto in Pulomas, and then it turns eastwards. Route 1 initially runs southeastward for 4 km, and then one kilometer eastward after 3-way junction with Jl. Bekasi Raya.

Cakung River marks the complete entrance of the route into East Jakarta. Continuing 1.3 km eastward, it interchanges with JORR East 2 in Cakung. The route's segment in Jakarta ends 3.5 km later, when it crosses Bendungan Merah River.

==== West Java ====
There are six streets designated as Route 1 in Bekasi City: Jl. Sultan Agung, Jl. Sudirman, Jl. A. Yani, Jl. Cut Meutia, Jl. Ir. H. Juanda, and Jl. Diponegoro. In Bekasi City, Route 1 initially runs southward as Jl. Sultan Agung for 3.5 km, and turns southeastward after overpassing Northern Railway Line at Kranji Station. Jl. Sultan Agung changes as Jl. Sudirman 1.5 km later, after a three-way junction with Jl. Patuha. Continuing 600 m east, Route 1 turns southward as Jl. A. Yani after a junction near Bekasi Stadium. It encounters an interchange with Jakarta–Cikampek Toll Road after running not until 2 km, and it then turns eastwards 800 m later after Pekayon Junction. After crossing Bekasi River, it encounters a junction in Rawa Panjang, and Jl. Cut Meutia carries Route 1. It then curves to the northeast, and Jl. Ir. H. Juanda merges 2.5 km later, after which the route is carried eastwards by Jl. Ir. H. Juanda. Jl. Diponegoro begins to carry Route 1 after crossing a stream 1.5 km later.

Continuing 800 m east, Route 1 reaches Bekasi Regency after crossing Siluman River. The Bekasi Regency section of Route 1 mostly goes eastwards for approximately 28 km, passing through the communities of Tambun, Cibitung, Cikarang, and Kedungwaringin. The route overpasses Northern railway line in Cikarang, the seat of Bekasi Regency. In Kedungwaringin, Route 1 crosses over Citarum River into Karawang Regency. There are 10 streets designated as Route 1 in Bekasi Regency: Jl Sultan Hasanuddin, Jl Teuku Umar, Jl Imam Bonjol, Jl Fatahillah, Jl R.E. Martadinata, Jl H.O.S. Cokroaminoto, Jl Yos Sudarso, Jl Gatot Subroto, Jl Raya Lemah Abang, and Jl Raya Rengasbandung.

Route 1 then proceeds into the urban center of Karawang, carried by Jl. Pangkal Perjuangan (the newest bypass street before the completion of Karawang Outer Ring Road) for 2.5 km. Jl. Pangkal Perjuangan then merges with Jl. Ahmad Yani in Karawang Indah Junction, and continuing southeastwards as Jl. Ahmad Yani for two kilometers before encountering a three-way junction in front of Karawang Mall. Route 1 then turns southeastwards as Jl Tuparev and running for approximately 5 km before encountering a junction with Karawang Outer Ring Road. Continuing 1.5 km southeast, it overpasses railway line in Klari, and then going for 500 m before encountering a junction with a street connecting it with Karawang Timur Toll Plaza of Jakarta–Cikampek Toll Road and Suryacipta City of Industry. Route 1 then curves to the east and going for 14 km as Jl Raya Klari, Jl Raya Kosambi, and Jl Ahmad Yani before reaching Cikampek Flyover that spanning over railway line of Cikampek-Padalarang. Parallel with that railway, there is Route 4 branching off beneath the flyover. Continuing 2.5 km east as Jl Jend Sudirman, Route 1 reaches Jomin Junction, where a branch of Route 1 merges after running from Mutiara Junction as long as two kilometers. A railway line connecting Cikampek and Prujakan Station in Cirebon stretches beneath the flyover carrying Route 1 adjacent with Jomin Junction. Continuing eight kilometers northeastwards as Jl Raya Pangulah, Route 1 turns eastwards in Jatisari for 1.7 km, still as Jalan Raya Pangulah. In this section, the route runs parallel with Cilamaya River.

Upon entering Subang Regency, Route 1 runs for 5.7 km eastwards, and then turns northeastwards for 28 km, passing through the subdistricts of Patokbeusi, Ciasem, Blanakan, and eventually Pamanukan. After intersecting with a provincial road connecting Pamanukan and Subang, the seat of Subang Regency, Route 1 crosses over Cipunagara River and curves to the east for eleven kilometers before entering Indramayu Regency in Sewo Bridge.

Route 1 then runs for 14 km eastwards before crossing over an irrigation channel located near the coast of Java Sea in Kertawinangun. The route then turns southeastward for 15 km before reaching Losarang, then it turns eastwards. A three-way junction in Lohbener, located 12 km east of Losarang, marks the change of Route 1's alignment, as it moves southwards and the beginning of Route 7 leading for Indramayu. After passing under a railway bridge and having an intersection with Jl. Ujung Jaya, Route 1 reaches Widasari Junction, located 8.5 km from Lohbener Junction. From here, Route 1 has two separate segments: the first one passes through Jatibarang and has a junction with provincial road leading for Karangampel and the second one is a bypass road that merges with the segment which has passed through Jatibarang 3 km southward. Most traffic follows the bypass road as it has less time to travel compared to entering Jatibarang. The route heads for village of Kliwed in southeast direction as long as six kilometers, and then it turns southward for 6.5 km before going into Cirebon Regency.

The route encounters a junction with Palimanan–Kanci Toll Road some 15.5 km southeastward from the northern border of Indramayu–Cirebon. Route 1 then reaches Palimanan Junction two kilometers southwards. Palimanan Junction also becomes southeastern terminus of Route 5 leading to Sumedang Regency. At this point, the Old Great Post starts to run concurrently with Route 1 in most of northern coast of Java (Pantura) after running concurrently with Route 5. Route 1 interchanges with Palimanan-Kanci Toll Road again in Plumbon, located six kilometers eastward from Palimanan. Continuing five kilometers east, Route 1 encounters Kedawung Roundabout, after which it turns southward, carried by Jl. BrigJend. HR. Dharsono.

After running for one kilometer, the route eventually enters Cirebon City, and runs southwards for 1.5 km, followed by a bend eastwards. Jl. BrigJend. HR. Dharsono becomes Jl. Jend. A. Yani after Kanggraksan Junction. Continuing 3.8 km eastwards, Jl. Jend. A. Yani overpasses two railway lines: Cirebon to Kroya and Northern Lines. Harjamukti Bus Station, the main bus station in Cirebon, is also located in Jl. Jend. A. Yani. In Pegambiran Junction, where a branch of Route 1 merges after running from Downtown Cirebon as long as two kilometers. From this point, Route 1 moves southeastward, and Kalijaga Bridge located one kilometer from Pegambiran marks the end of Route 1's segment at Cirebon City.

Upon entering Cirebon Regency again, Route 1 continues southeastward, parallels the shoreline. 6.5 km later, it intersects with a road leading for Kanci Toll Plaza, the easternmost point of Palimanan-Kanci Toll Road and the westernmost point of Kanci–Pejagan Toll Road. Continuing its course eastwards, it passes over the subdistricts of Pangenan, Gebang, and Losari before crossing over Cisanggarung River 21.5 km later.

==== Central Java ====
Cisanggarung River is the western border of Central Java, from which Route 1 goes southeastward into Brebes Regency, adjacent with Northern railway line. In Brebes section of Route 1, there are many salty egg sellers, as it becomes Brebes' main product. 4.5 km later, it turns eastwards, and reaches Downtown Brebes 22 km later. There, Route 1 is divided. The eastbound section follows Jl. Ahmad Yani, and the westbound section follows Jl. Jenderal Sudirman, where it passes by Brebes Station. Jl. Ahmad Yani then merges with Jl. Jend. Sudirman, and proceeds eastward as Jl. Gajah Mada.

Continuing 2.5 km east, Route 1 enters Tegal City after crossing over Gangsa River. The route then runs for three kilometer eastwards. After encountering a junction near Pramesthi Hotel, Route 1 turns northward, carried by Jl. Gajah Mada (1 km) and then Jl. MT. Haryono (500 m). The junction also becomes the beginning point of Route 6 leading for Slawi, the seat of Tegal Regency. After a junction near Port of Tegal, Route 1 goes eastward as Jl. Yos Sudarso and Jl. Martoloyo for two kilometers.

Upon crossing over Ketiwon River, Route 1 goes into Tegal Regency. The route runs parallel with Northern railway line in the south and coastline of Java Sea in the north. Before reaching Pemalang Regency, it travels eastward for 23 km, passes over the subdistricts of Kramat, Suradadi, and Warureja.

A bridge over Plawangan River marks the entrance of Route 1 into Pemalang. Route 1 moves eastward for one kilometer, and then it turns southeastward for 1.5 km. Route 1 follows Pemalang Ring Road after Pagaran Junction. It initially runs for six kilometers eastwards, and then curves southward. Route 1 turns eastward 780 m later after Gandulan Junction, in where Jl. Perintis Kemerdekaan coming from Downtown Pemalang merges. Route 1 then goes twelve kilometers eastwards until a bend in Comal. It then curves northeastward for three kilometers, followed by another curving southeastward.

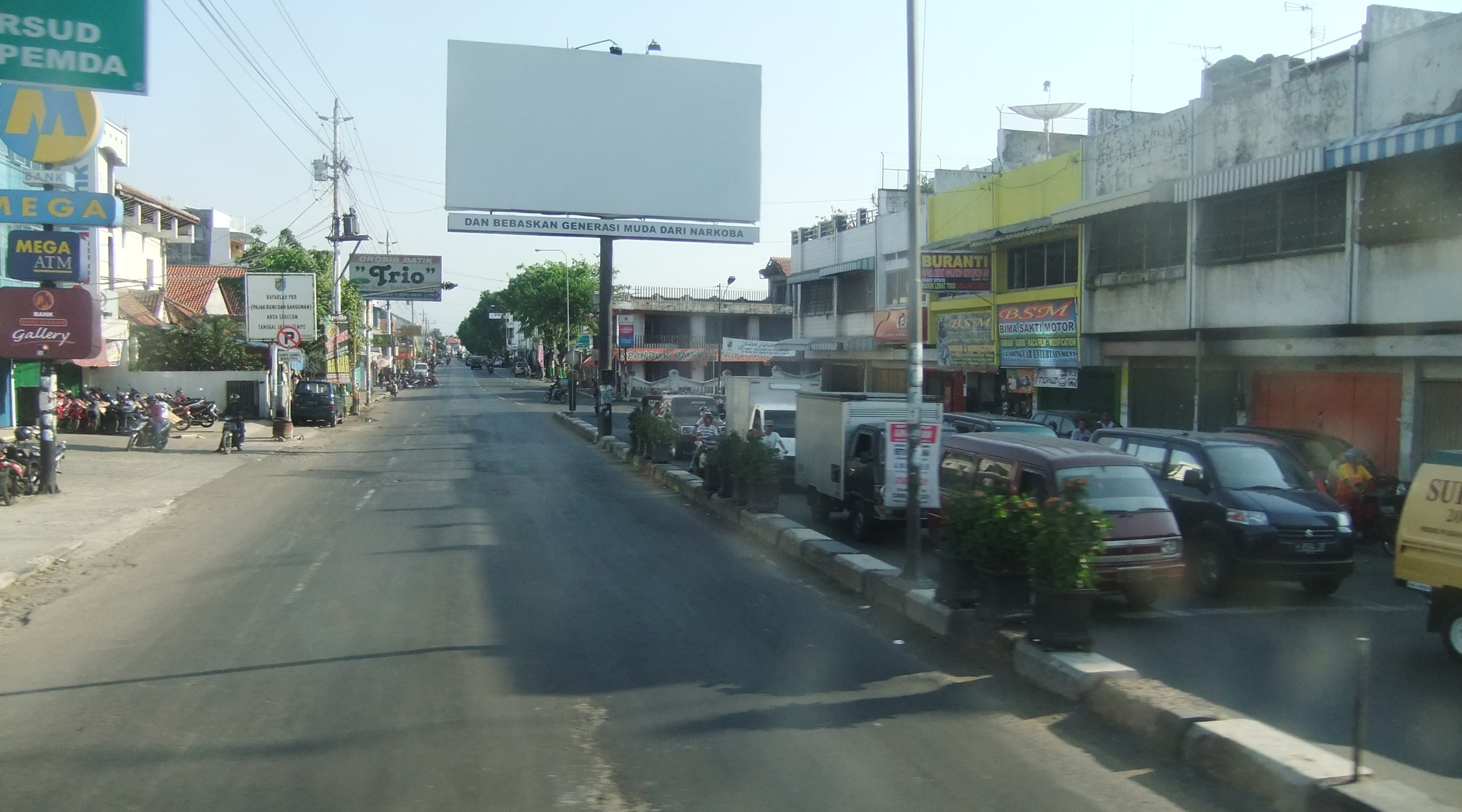
Route 1's segment in Pekalongan

Route 1 enters Pekalongan Regency some 450 m later after crossing Sepait River. The route runs eastward, where it passes through the subdistricts of Siwalan, Wiradesa, and Tirto. It leaves Pekalongan Regency 5.5 km later when crossing Meduri River, and then enters Pekalongan City. In this segment, Route 1 is carried by Jl. Gajah Mada for two kilometers, when it is divided into two sections in front of Pekalongan Station. The eastbound sections follows Jl. Merdeka for 480 m. After crossing with Jl. Imam Bonjol and Jl. Patriot, it turns southward as Jl. Pemuda, while the westbound section still follows Jl. Gajah Mada. The two sections meet in front of Muhammadiyah College of Economics, where it continues southward as Jl. KH. Mas Mansyur, and has level crossing with Northern railway line. One kilometer later, it encounters Ponolawen Junction, where Route 1 turns eastward as Jl. Jend. Sudirman, Jl. Setiabudi, and then Jl. Sutomo. Ponolawen Junction also becomes an access to Kajen, the seat of Pekalongan Regency.

After entering Batang Regency 4.5 km later, it goes into the downtown. Continuing 3.3 km east, it makes a curving to the northeast. When passing Sambong Bridge 550 m later, it begins to enter a mountainous region that becomes a continuation of Dieng Plateau located in the south. Route 1 winds through the subdistricts of Kandeman, Tulis, Subah, Banyuputih, and Gringsing, in which there are many warungs and restaurants founded to cater all long-distance travellers. Continuing 32 km east, it encounters a three-way junction in Surodadi Village, where Route 1 goes eastward, while most traffic in North Coast of Java takes the newer road diverging from here. 470 m later, the old Great Post Road diverges from Route 1. All heavy vehicles aren't permitted to pass through Route 1 in this section considering its sharp climbs; instead they are obliged to take the curvaceous Great Post Road that passes through Alasroban Jungle. Route 1 and Great Post Road meets again 1.5 km northeastward. Route 1 then runs northeast for 360 m, and the mountainous segment before Semarang ends here. After encountering a junction near Gringsing Market, the route continues not until three kilometers eastward. After merging with the newer road that has been diverged from Surodadi, Route 1 moves northeastward for 910 m and then eastward for 570 m.

Kuto River is the eastern limit of Batang Regeny, and Route 1 goes into Kendal Regency. After continuing 650 m eastward, it encounters a three-way junction in Sambongsari village, where Route 1 turns to the north to follow Weleri Ring Road to break the traffic in order to avoid traffic jam in Weleri. Route 1 continues 1.6 km north, then 1.5 km northeast and 1.5 km east. In this ring road, the Northern railway line crosses underneath the road. In Wonotenggang village, Route 1 continues 6.5 km northeast, and then curves to the north. 1.5 km later, it curves to the east, where it passes through the urban center of Cepiring. In front of Cepiring Sugar Factory, the route is divided between the east- and westbound sections. The two sections meets again after crossing Bodri River in Patebon, and then continues eastward as Jl. Soekarno-Hatta. The route is divided again in Downtown Kendal, where the eastbound section is still carried by Jl. Soekarno-Hatta, where the westbound section is carried by Jl. Pemuda. The two sections meets again 1.5 km east, and travels southeast for 1.4 km and then curves eastward for three kilometers. In a junction in Brangsong, Route 1 follows Kaliwungu Ring Road, which has been built in order to avoid every travellers from the congestion in Kaliwungu. In the ring road, the route moves 1.9 km northward, followed by a curving eastward. Four kilometers later, the route turns to southeast for 650 m and then southward for 750 m. After overpassing Northern railway line, Route 1 merges again with the old road from Kaliwungu, and then continues eastward. Kendal segment of Route 1 ends in Gambilangu, a hamlet notoriously known as red-light district in Kendal Regency-Semarang City border, 750 m later.

Route 1 enters Semarang as Jl. Urip Sumoharjo for 4.5 km, followed by Jl. Siliwangi. From the beginning of Jl. Walisongo in front of Wijaya Kusuma Industrial Zone, Route 1 has common alignment with Route 14. Continuing 4.5 km east, it encounters Jerakah Junction, where Jl. Walisongo becomes Jl. Siliwangi. Jerakah Junction was also the eastern border of Kendal Regency before 1976. After running for 680 m eastward, Route 1 intersects with Krapyak Exit of Semarang Inner City Toll Road. Most of long-distance travellers who don't want to stop in Semarang usually takes the toll road. Route 1 moves eastward. Kalibanteng Junction, located 1.7 km east, marks the divergence of Route 1 and Route 14, where Route 1 follows Harbour Ring Road northward, while Route 1 leading for Ungaran follows Jl. Jend. Sudirman. Kalibanteng Junction also provides access toward Achmad Yani International Airport. Continuing four kilometers northward with a railway passing under it, Route 1 then turns eastward after crossing over Western Floodway (Banjir Kanal Barat). Continuing 3.7 km east, Route 1 moves to the south as Jl. Ronggowarsito near Port of Semarang. The length of Jl. Ronggowarsito is one kilometer, and has railway crossing near Tawang Station, and its southern portion is located in Old City. In the southern end of Jl. Ronggowarsito, Route 1 turns eastward as Jl. Pengapon in one-way direction (to the east), making travellers wishing to go to Port of Semarang must encircle the Old City. After Jl. Pengapon merges with one-way (westbound) Jl. Raden Patah one kilometer eastward, Route 1 is carried by Jl. Kaligawe. Jl. Kaligawe then crosses over Eastern Floodway (Banjir Kanal Timur) and intersects with railway line 490 m northeastward. Jl. Kaligawe interchanges with Semarang Inner City Toll Road 510 m northeast, and then passes through Harbour Industrial Zone before encountering Semarang City-Demak Regency border 4.5 km later.

When entering Demak Regency, Route 1 is aligned northeast for 15.5 km before intersecting with Demak Ring Road. In this segment, the route parallels with Sayung River, passes through the subdistricts of Sayung and Karangtengah. Most traffic travelling in the North Coast follows the ringroad instead of entering the Downtown Demak. At an intersection located some 650 m northeast, Route 1 turns to north following Jl. Sultan Hadiwijaya for 1.7 km. After a junction near Demak Heroes Cemetery, the route is carried by Jl. Pemuda until intersecting with Jl. Sultan Patah 960 m eastward. Continuing 3.5 km northeast, it intersects with Demak Ring Road, and proceeds to the northeast again for three kilometers before having a three-way junction in Trengguli Village with a road connecting Trengguli with Jepara Regency. Passing through the subdistricts of Mijen, Gajah, and Karanganyar, Route 1 reaches Kudus Regency after crossing over Serang River 13 km northeastward.

Around 550 m from Demak-Kudus border northeastward, Route 1 intersects with Kudus Outer Ring Road in Jati. Most travellers not wishing to make a stop in Downtown Kudus follows the ring road as it avoids traffic jam around alun-alun located 4.5 km from the junction. There is an access toward Jepara from alun-alun. The route then continues 4.5 km eastward before intersecting with Kudus Outer Ring Road in Ngembalrejo Village. Route 1 then runs to the east for 4.6 km before turning to the northeast after encountering Mbulung Junction in Jekulo.

Route 1 enters Pati Regency 5.5 km later, and it is aligned northeastwards for eight kilometers before curving to the east in Downtown Pati. 1.3 km later, it passes through alun-alun, and then it still running eastward. From alun-alun there is an access toward Tayu and Jepara via Bangsri. After an intersection located 740 m from alun-alun, it turns northeastwards. In Kademangan, located 3.5 km northeast of the junction, it intersects with the Pati Ring Road, that is currently uncompleted yet. Continuing 7.8 km northeast, the route reaches Juwana, where the road from Tayu merges with it. Near alun-alun, the route is divided between the east- and westbound sections. The two sections meets again after crossing Silugonggo River, and then continues northeastward for 990 m and then eastwards for nine kilometers.

After crossing over Randugunting River, the route goes into Rembang Regency, and begins to approach Java Sea in Kaliori. Route 1 then follows west–east direction, and reaches Downtown Rembang after running for 11.5 km from Pati-Rembang border. In Adipura Monument, Route 1 intersects with Jl. RA. Kartini, the road leading for Blora Regency. Route 1 then runs to the east for 3.5 km, and then northeast after Celangapan Junction for six kilometer. After that, Route 1 moves not until three kilometer, and has an intersection with Jl. Eyang Sambu leading to Bojonegoro Regency in East Java. 300 m later, its alignment changes after Kajar Junction, where it runs northward, going along the edge of Mount Lasem. 4.6 km later, it travels along the coast of Java Sea in north direction for one kilometer, then followed by northeast direction for 3.5 km, passing near Sluke Power Station. It then curves to the southeast, and remained so until reaching East Java border twenty three kilometers later, after passing through the subdistricts of Kragan and Sarang.

==== East Java ====
The first 18 km of Route 1 in Tuban Regency follows northwest-southeast direction until reaching Tambakboyo. From there, the route curves to the northeast for eight kilometers until curving again to the southeast, drawing farther away from shoreline. 12 km later, it runs again near the shoreline in Jenu, from which it proceeds for another southeast direction. Upon arriving in Tuban some seven kilometers later, it is divided between east- and westbound section. The eastbound section is carried by Jl. Martadinata and Jl. Sudirman for four kilometers, after which Route 17 that carries the old Great Post Road diverges from Route 1, while Route 1 itself turns to the south, carried by Jl. Manunggal until joining with Route 1's westbound section in Manunggal Monument. Its westbound section is respectively carried from east to west by Jl. Pahlawan, Jl. HOS. Cokroaminoto, Jl. Moh. Yamin, Jl. Gajah Mada, Jl. Dr. Wahidin, and Jl. Teuku Umar. Route 1 runs to the southeast for three kilometers, continued by southward direction for three kilometers, and then it runs southeastwards for seven kilometers before crossing over Solo River, that becomes the southern border of Tuban Regency, marking the entrance of Route 1 in Lamongan Regency.

Not far from the bridge, Route 1 curves northeast and merges with Route 20 that previously passes underneath the Route 1. The Route 1's section in Lamongan Regency mostly runs eastwards, passing through subdistricts of Babat, Pucuk, Sukodadi, Turi, Lamongan, and Deket for 32.5 km, followed by a southeastward curving. Northern railway line runs parallel with entire Lamongan segment of Route 1; the route is crossed by the railway for two times, both located in Downtown Lamongan.

One kilometer from the curving, Route 1 goes into Gresik Regency. The route still parallels with railway lines before drawing farther some 7.5 km later. Route 1 then curves to the east for two kilometers, followed by southeastward curving. One kilometer later, it curves east again. Route 1 is divided between east- and westbound section near Bunder Bus Station located 1.5 km from the curving. It encounters a junction with Surabaya-Gresik Toll Road approximately one kilometer eastward, where most vehicles intending to go to Surabaya, Manyar or Sidoarjo take the toll road, while the vehicles intending to go to Downtown Gresik take the route. Continuing 910 m east, it passes underneath the toll road and encounters Sumber Junction some 1.25 km later. Route 1 turns northwards for 840 m, and proceeds to the east after reaching Gresik Kota Baru Junction. Route 1 then meets the eastern terminus of Route 17 some 2.5 km later, making it runs concurrently again with Great Post Road. Continuing 1.7 km east, it turns to the south after encountering a junction near PT. Semen Gresik factory. Before entering Surabaya, Route 1 is divides between south- and northbound section approximately 2.5 km later, and then both sections passing over Lamong River.

Upon entering Surabaya, both sections merges again, and Route 1 encounters an intersection with Romokalisari Toll Plaza. The route continues southeastward, and is crossed by Gresik railway line branching off from Northern Line in Kandangan Station. Continuing 2.7 km southeast, Route 1 runs inside Margomulyo Industrial Zone for six kilometers. 1.5 km later, Route 1 passes underneath Surabaya-Gresik Toll Road. In Morokrembangan village, Route 1 turns to the south after encountering a junction, carried by Jl. Demak, which has a major intersection with Jl. Dupak (providing an access into Surabaya-Gresik Toll Road) and Northern railway line. After proceeding for 2.5 km, Route 1 encounters a junction with Jl. Kalibutuh, and turns to the east. It encounters an intersection near Tembok Market some 800 m later. From here, Route 1 is carried by Jl. Raya Arjuno running southward for 850 m and southeastward for 550 m. In Pasar Kembang, Route 1 meets a junction again, an runs to the south as Jl. Pasar Kembang for 680 m. Route 1 encounters again with an intersection, and proceeds southeast as Jl. Diponegoro for 2.7 km. Route 1 has two major intersections around Surabaya Zoo, in which it is carried by Jl. Wonokromo. After crossing over Mas River, Route 1 runs southwards, and overpassing Southern railway line 700 m later. From here until reaching Sidoarjo Regency in the south, Route 1 is carried by Jl. Ahmad Yani for 4.6 km, running parallel with Eastern railway line that has branched off from Surabaya Inner City Line in Wonokromo Station that also becomes the eastern terminus for Southern Line.

Waru Roundabout marks the boundary between Surabaya and Sidoarjo. It also provides access to Surabaya-Gempol Toll Road and Juanda International Airport. 960 m south of the roundabout, Route 1 overpasses a three-way junction with Route 15 leading for Mojokerto. In Aloha Roundabout, located two kilometers south, Route 1 is divided between north- and southbound directions, where the roundabout provides access toward the airport via Jl. Juanda. Eastern railway line still runs in the east of the route before underpassing the route in Buduran some 6.5 km southward. When entering Downtown Sidoarjo, Route 1 is carried by Jl. RM. Mangundiprojo (450 m), Jl. Jenggolo (710 m), and Jl. A. Yani (890 m), passing alun-alun. From here, Route 1 is divided between south- and northbound directions. The southbound direction is carried by Jl. Gajah Mada (970 m) and Jl. Mojopahit (1.2 km), while the northbound direction is carried by Jl. Gatot Subroto (350 m), Jl. Sunandar Priyosudarmo (1.2 km), Jl. Diponegoro (960 m), and Jl. Thamrin (250 m). All heavy vehicles are obliged to take Sidoarjo Eastern Ringroad. After meeting in Tenggulunan village, Route 1 runs southward and intersects with railway line some 3.4 km later. Porong Arterial Road intersects with Route 1 nearby, and most traffic between Sidoarjo and Malang takes the arterial road in order to avoid traffic jam in Porong. After the intersection, Route 1 runs parallel with the railway and Sidoarjo mudflow. Continuing One kilometer south, it intersects with Surabaya-Gempol Toll Road, and, after passing near Porong Market and Porong River, exits Sidoarjo Regency some 2.8 km southward.

Upon entering Pasuruan Regency, Route 1 meets an intersection where Route 23 leading to Malang diverges. Route 1 itself turns to the southeast, and passes under a viaduct carrying Eastern railway line. The viaduct is very low that makes all heavy vehicles and busses have to take Route 23 first southward and enter Route 1 again in Gempol Roundabout located 2.5 km from the viaduct. The roundabout also provides access toward former Gempol-Porong segment of Surabaya-Gempol Toll Road that has currently been damaged by Sidoarjo mudflow. Route 1 curves eastward, and runs parallel with Eastern railway line until entering Bangil, the seat of Pasuruan Regency, some 4.5 km later. Route 1 begins to divide between east- and westbound segment in front of Pegadaian Building, Indonesian pawnshop service. After meeting 500 m later, Route 1 proceeds to the east. 2.5 km later, it intersects railway line, and runs parallel with the railway. After proceeding to the northeast for 1.7 km, it curves to the southeast.

After running for 6.5 km, Route 1 crosses Welang River, entering Pasuruan City. In a junction near Kraton Market located 460 m east, Route 1 is carried by two different trunk roads. The northern part is carried by Jl. Soekarno-Hatta (3.9 km), Jl. Balai Kota (430 m), Jl. Veteran (880 m), and Jl. Ir. H. Juanda (2 km), while the southern part is carried by Jl. Gatot Subroto (2.9 km), Jl. Urip Sumoharjo (1.3 km), Jl. Untung Suropati (700 m), Jl. Hasyim As'ari (1.7 km) and Jl. HOS. Cokroaminoto (2.2 km). After the two parts meet again in Blandongan village, Route 1 proceeds to the southeast. It exits Pasuruan City 670 m later, then it enters Pasuruan Regency again. Continuing seven kilometers southeast, it intersects railway line near Grati. Eleven kilometers east of the rail crossing, Route 1 reaches Nguling Bridge, marking the entrance to Probolinggo Regency.

Continuing 1.5 km southeast, Route 1 crosses railway line near Tongas Asri Restaurant, Tongas, thus making the railway line runs parallel with the route. 1.5 km from railway crossing, there is a three-way junction that has been a most-taken access toward Bromo Tengger Semeru National Park. Route 1 reaches Ketapang Junction some 8.5 km southeastward, where the western part of Route 25 diverges. The junction is also an entrance to Probolinggo City. Route 1 initially runs to the east for four kilometers. After a junction with Jl. Suroyo, Route 1 curves southeastward, and encounters the last crossing with Eastern railway line one kilometer later. 580 m later, Route 1 encounters a junction with the eastern part of Route 25 in Randu Panggeng Junction.

Route 1 enters Probolinggo Regency again some 860 m southeastward. In Gending, located seven kilometers southeastward, the route approaches the coast of Madura Strait in Bentar Beach and begins to curves eastwards for five kilometers before curving northeastwards and drawing away from the strait. Before being aligned eastwards 22 km later, the route passes through the subdistricts of Gending, Pajarakan, Kraksaan (seat of Probolinggo Regency), and Paiton. Six kilometers later, Route 1 enters Paiton Generating Station, and begins to be curvaceous. There is also a rest area in the vicinity of Paiton Generating Station.

Upon exiting Paiton Generating Station some six kilometer later, the route enters Situbondo Regency, and begins to travel along the coast. Continuing ten kilometer east, it reaches Besuki, the biggest community in Western Situbondo Regency. After passing through alun-alun, the route curves to the north, and turns to the east after encountering a junction. In Suboh, located 3.5 km east, the route intersects with a regional road leading for Bondowoso Regency. In Mlandingan, it curves to the northeast six kilometers later, going along the edge of Mount Ringgit. The route runs adjacent with the coast until reaching Panarukan 22 km eastward. In this segment, the route also passes near Pasir Putih Beach, that becomes a popular tourist destination in the Eastern salient of Java (Indonesian: Tapal Kuda). There are many hotels and restaurants built in the area. In Panarukan, there is a level crossing with now-defunct Kalisat to Panarukan railway line. After crossing over Sampeyan River, which becomes the eastern terminus of Great Post Road built by Daendels, the route reaches Downtown Situbondo seven kilometers eastward. Route 1 continues nine kilometers east, intersecting narrow-gauge railway in Panji that carries sugarcane lorry to Panji Sugar Factory, and curves to the southeast in Kapongan. After passing through the subdistricts of Arjasa, Jangkar, Asembagus, and Banyuputih, the route enters Baluran National Park some 28 km southeast. In this segment, the route curves to the south and goes through a curvaceous path for 21.5 km.

After intersecting with a road going into the national park, Route 1 goes into Banyuwangi Regency 450 m southward, marked by a bridge over Bajulmati River. After running for 14 km southeastward, Route 1 approaches the coast of Bali Strait in Bangsring village, and remains so until reaching Ketapang nine kilometers southward. Before reaching Ketapang, the route passes through Watudodol Beach, a place that gives a sight over Bali. travellers Route 1's course ends in front of Ketapang Ferry Terminal, and its course toward Downtown Banyuwangi is continued by Route 3.
