= Indonesian National Route 3 =

Road in Indonesia

Nasional 3

Major junctions
- West end: Cilegon
- National 1 National 2 National 4 National 5 National 6 National 8 National 10; National 11; National 14; National 15; National 18; National 19; National 22; National 23; National 25
- East end: Ketapang

Location
- Country: Indonesia

Highway system
- Transport in Indonesia
| ← National 2 | → National 4 |

Indonesian National Route 3 is a major road in Java Island, Indonesia. It passes through five provinces, namely Banten, West Java, Central Java, Yogyakarta, and East Java. In parts it runs close to the south coast of Java. It connects Cilegon and Ketapang.

== Route ==
Cilegon – Anyer – Carita – Labuan – Simpang Labuan - Cibaliung – Muara Binuangeun – Bayah – Cibareno – Cisolok – Pelabuhan Ratu – Bagbagan – Cikembang – Cibadak - Cisaat - Sukabumi – Gekbrong - Cianjur – Citarum - Rajamandala - Padalarang – Bandung – Cileunyi – Nagreg – Limbangan - Malangbong – Rajapolah – Ancol – Ciawi – Ciamis – Majenang – Karangpucung - Wangon – Rawalo - Sampang - Buntu – Kebumen – Prembun - Kutoarjo - Purworejo – Karangnongko - Temon - Wates – Milir - Sentolo - Yogyakarta – Piyungan - Gading - Wonosari – Semanu – Ponjong – Pracimantoro – Donorojo – Punung – Pringkuku – Pacitan – Panggul – Dongko - Trenggalek – Tulungagung – Blitar – Wlingi – Kepanjen – Gondanglegi – Dampit - Lumajang – Wonorejo – Tanggul - Rambipuji – Jember – Mayang - Garahan - Genteng - Gambor - Rogojampi - Banyuwangi – Ketapang

== Gallery ==
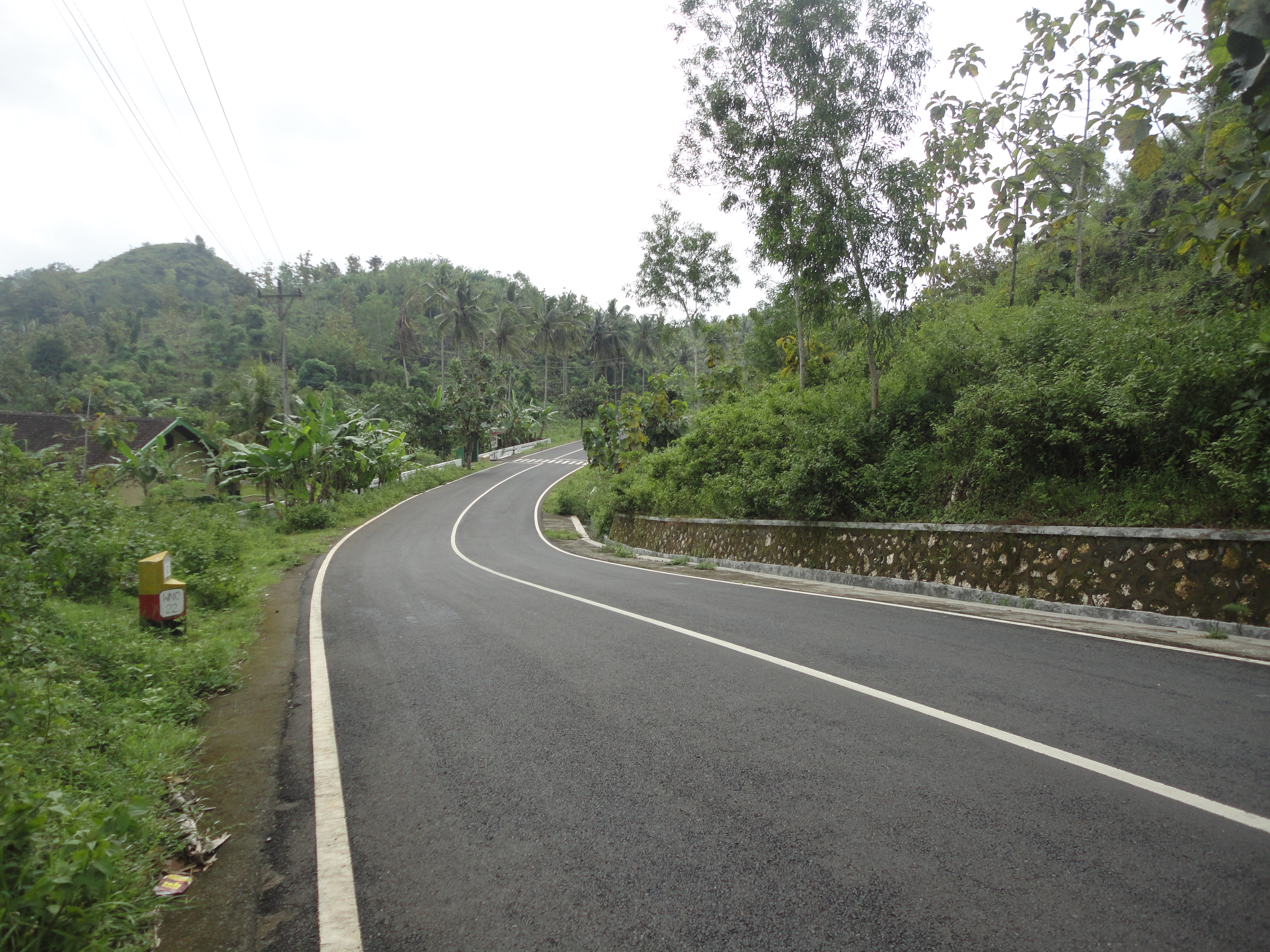

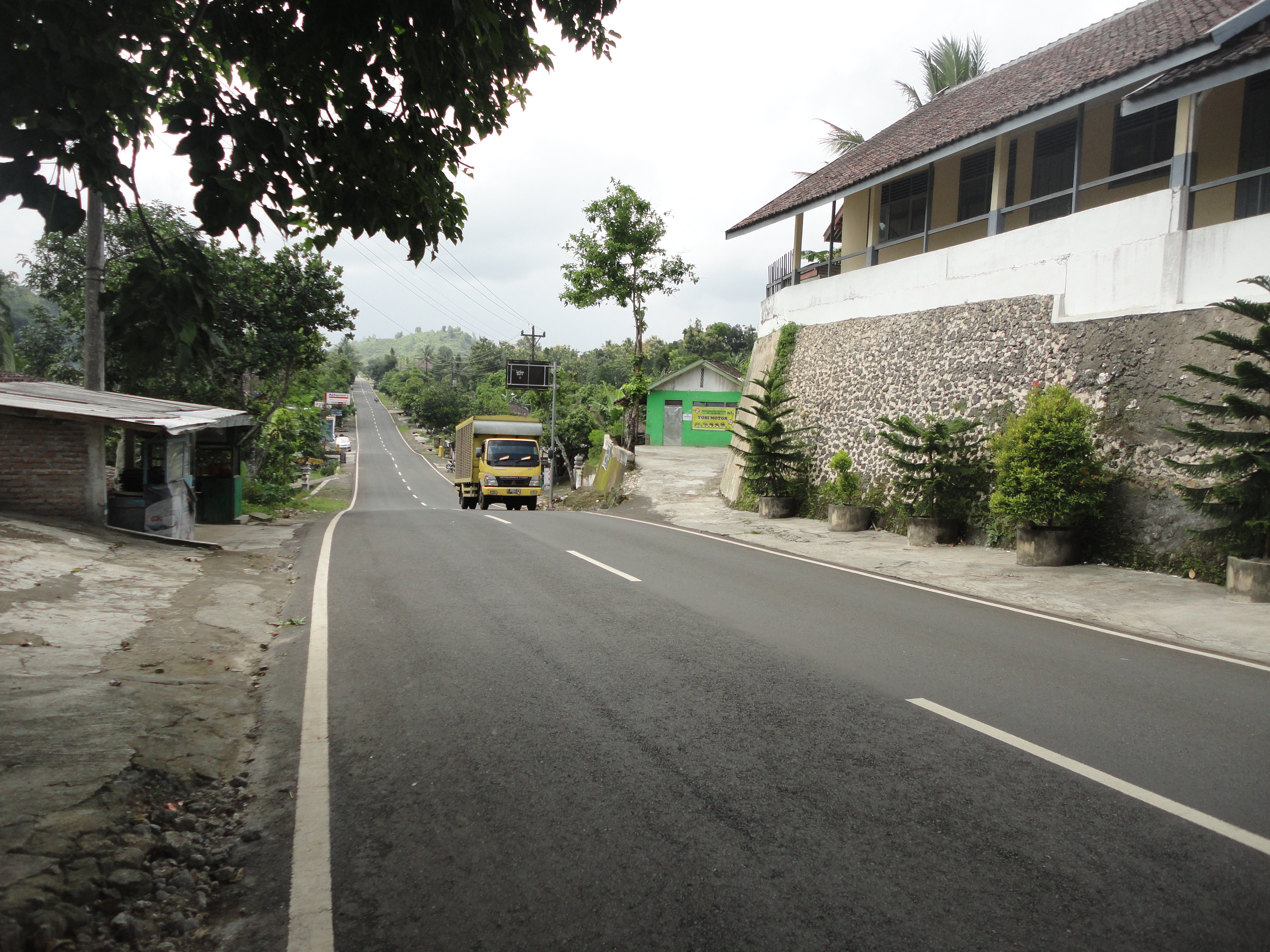

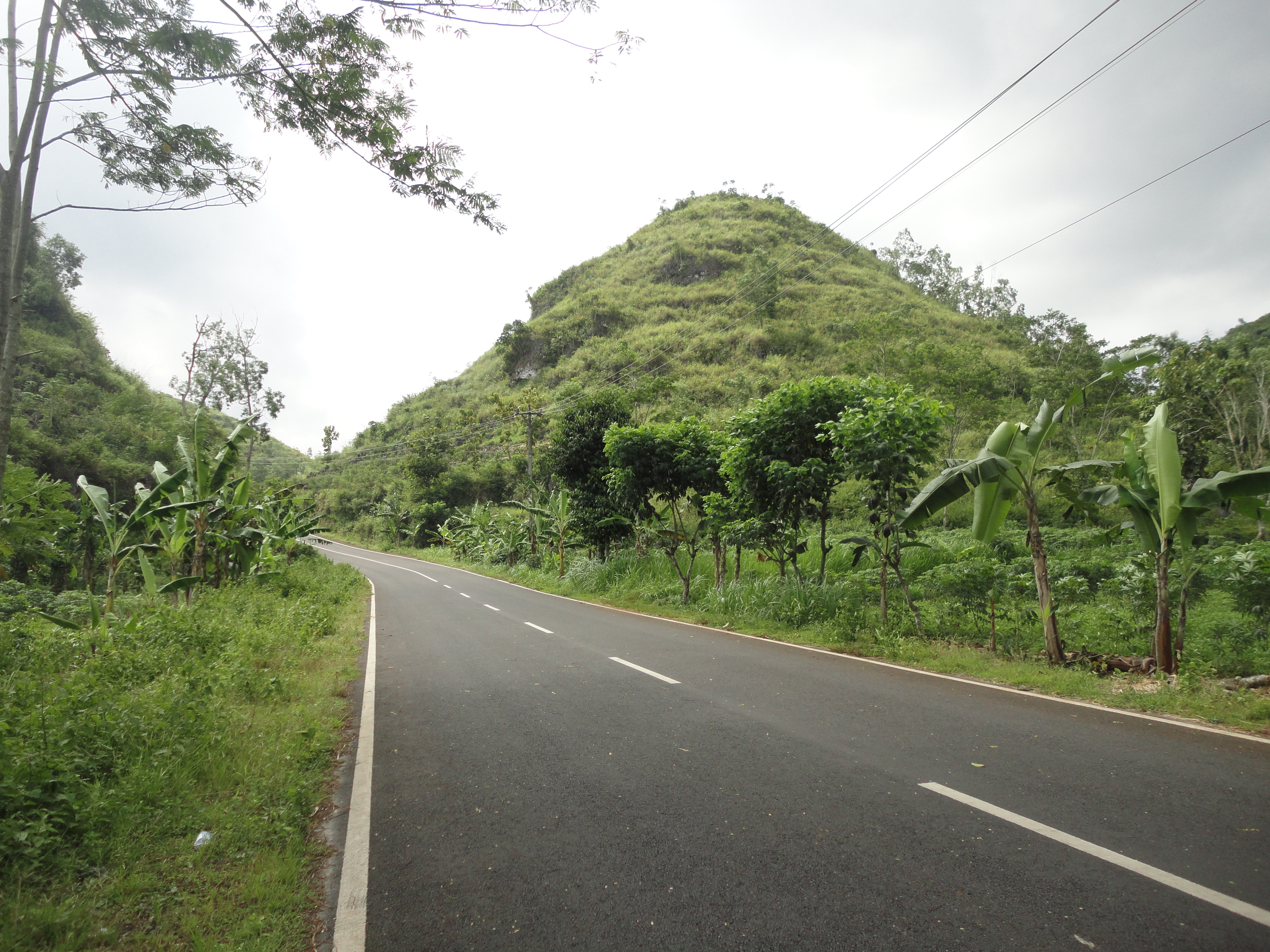
