= Indonesian National Route 5 =

Road in Indonesia

Nasional 5

Route information
- Length: 100 km (62 mi)

Major junctions
- West end: Cileunyi
- National 1 National 3
- East end: Palimanan

Location
- Country: Indonesia

Highway system
- Transport in Indonesia
← National 4	→ National 6

Indonesian National Route 5 is a road in the national route system that completely lies in the West Java province, and links the Cileunyi subdistrict, located near the city of Bandung in Bandung Regency, West Java, to the subdistrict of Palimanan, located near the city of Cirebon, in Cirebon Regency, West Java.

== Route ==
Cileunyi - Jatinangor - North Sumedang - Jatiwangi - Palimanan
