= Indonesian National Route 7 =

Road in Indonesia

Nasional 7

Major junctions
- West end: Lohbener
- National 1
- East end: Cirebon

Location
- Country: Indonesia

Highway system
- Transport in Indonesia
← National 6	→ National 8

Indonesian National Route 7 connects Lohbener and Cirebon. It goes parallel with Indonesian National Route 1.

== Route ==
Lohbener - Indramayu - Karangampel - Gunung Jati - Cirebon
