= Indonesian National Route 8 =

Road in Indonesia

Nasional 8

Route information
- Length: 47 km (29 mi)

Major junctions
- North end: Purwokerto
- National 3 National 6 National 9
- South end: Gumilir

Location
- Country: Indonesia

Highway system
- Transport in Indonesia
← National 7	→ National 9

Indonesian National Route 8 is a road in the national route system that completely lies in the Central Java province, and links an area called Gumillir, North Cilacap, Cilacap, to the town of Purwokerto.

== Route ==
Purwokerto - Patikraja - Rawalo - Sampang - Maos- Kesugihan - Slarang - Gumilir
