= Indonesian National Route 22 =

Road in Indonesia

Nasional 22

Major junctions
- North end: Kertosono
- National 3 National 15
- South end: Tulungagung

Location
- Country: Indonesia

Highway system
- Transport in Indonesia
← National 21	→ National 23

Indonesia National Route 22 is a national route in Java connect Kertosono in Nganjuk with Tulungagung.

== Route ==
Kertosono-Kediri-Ngadiluwih-Tulungagung
