= Lowo Cave =

Cave in East Java, Indonesia

Coordinates: 8.076410°S 111.706040°E

- Gua Lowo
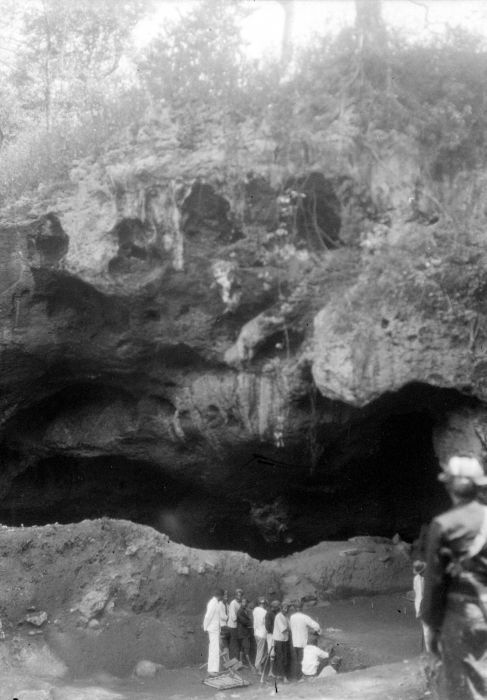
- Archeological excavations at the cave
- Interactive map of Lowo Cave
- Location: Trenggalek, East Java, Indonesia
- Depth: 50 m
- Length: 5 km
- Discovery: 1931
- Geology: Limestone
- Entrances: 1

Gua Lowo is a cave which is located at Watuagung, Watulimo sub-district of Trenggalek Regency, East Java in Indonesia. Gua Lowo is an Indonesian word, which means bat's cave. There are no other fauna except bats in this cave. The cave is about 5 kilometers long, though only 859 meters of the cave is accessible. Based on statements from cave experts, Mr. Gilbert Manthovani and Dr. Robert K Kho in 1984, Gua Lowo is the longest natural cave in Southeast Asia.

This cave is located in the hills of Karts, which was discovered in 1931 by a resident named Lomedjo. In 1983 it was declared as a tourist destination.

At the moment Gua Lowo managed directly by the Trenggalek Regency government through Dinas Pariwisata dan Kebudayaan Trenggalek.
