= Indonesian National Route 20 =

Road in Indonesia

Nasional 20

Route information
- Length: 96 km (60 mi)

Major junctions
- North end: Semarang
- National 1 National 14; National 15; National 16
- South end: Kartasura

Location
- Country: Indonesia

Highway system
- Transport in Indonesia
| ← National 19 | → National 21 |

Indonesian National Route 20 is a major road in Central Java, Indonesia. It passes through 2 City & 3 regencies in Central Java.

== Route ==
The route traverses from north to south: Semarang – Ungaran – Bawen – Salatiga – Boyolali – Kartasura.
