= Indonesian National Route 25 =

Road in Indonesia

Nasional 25

Route information
- Length: 48 km (30 mi)

Major junctions
- North end: Probolinggo
- National 1 National 3
- South end: Lumajang

Location
- Country: Indonesia

Highway system
- Transport in Indonesia
← National 24	→ National 1

Indonesian National Route 25 is a National Route in Java connect Probolinggo in North with Lumajang in South

== Route ==
Probolinggo-Klakah-Lumajang
