= Indonesian National Route 24 =

Road in Indonesia

Nasional 24

Route information
- Length: 30 km (19 mi)

Major junctions
- West end: Mojokerto
- National 1 National 15; National 23
- East end: Gempol

Location
- Country: Indonesia

Highway system
- Transport in Indonesia
← National 23	→ National 25

Indonesian National Route 24 is a National Route in Java connect Mojokerto In West and Gempol in East. This National Route is a main road from Mojokerto to Pasuruan.

== Route ==
Mojokerto-Mojosari-Gempol
