= Jatibarang, Indramayu =

District in Indramayu Regency, Indonesia

Coordinates: 6.475827°S 108.310382°E

Jatibarang is a district (Indonesian: Kecamatan) in Indramayu Regency of West Java, Indonesia.

Jatibarang is located 19 kilometres south of the regency capital of Indramayu town.

== List of villages ==
1. Bulak Lor
2. Bulak
3. Jatibarang Baru
4. Jatibarang
5. Jatisawit Lor
6. Jatisawit
7. Kalimati
8. Kebulen
9. Krasak
10. Lobener Lor
11. Lobener
12. Malangsemirang
13. Pawidean
14. Pilangsari
15. Sukalila
