= Indonesian National Route 14 =

Road in Indonesia

Nasional 14

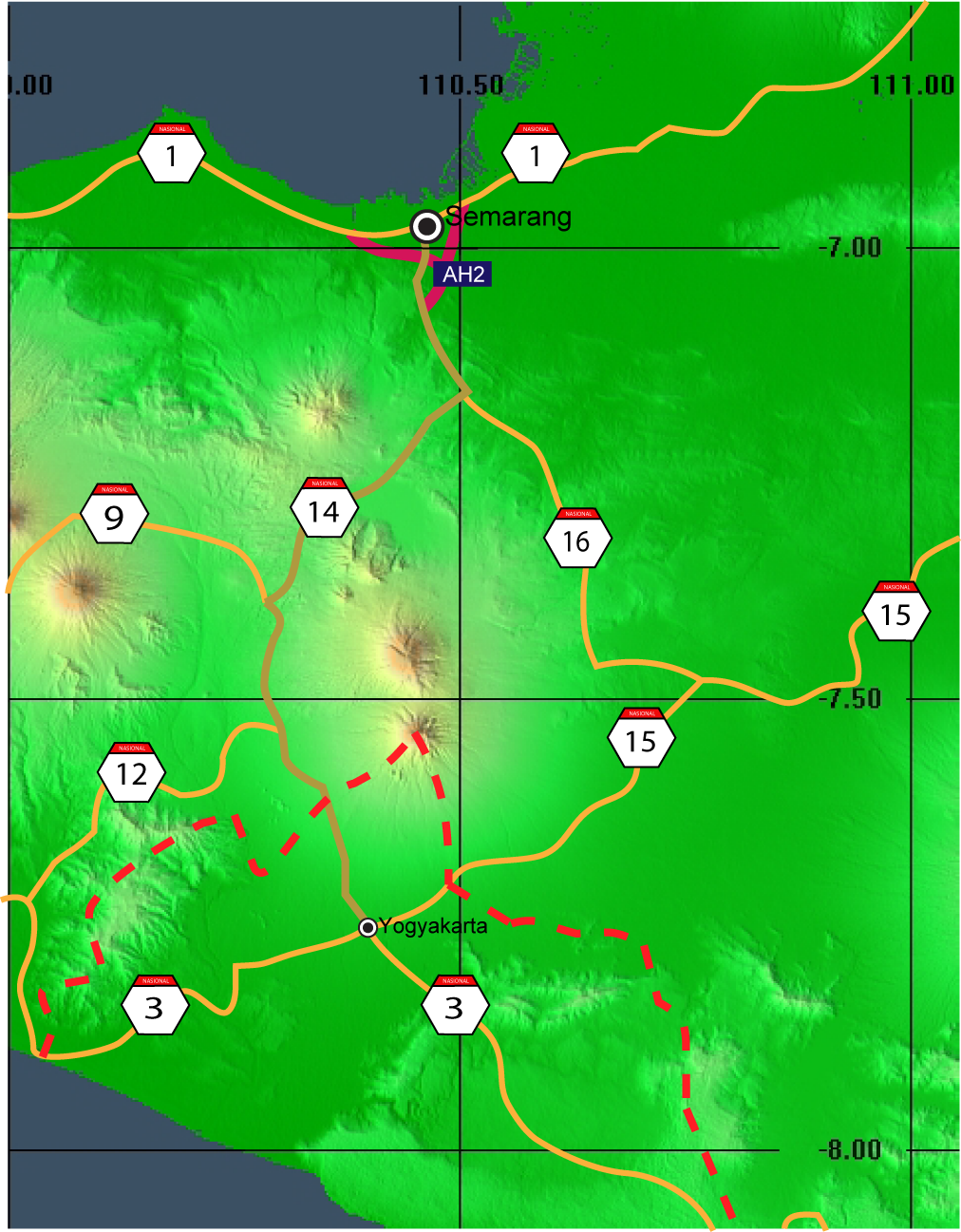

Route information
- Length: 128 km (80 mi)

Major junctions
- North end: Semarang
- National 1 National 3 National 9 National 15; National 16; National 20
- South end: Yogyakarta

Location
- Country: Indonesia

Highway system
- Transport in Indonesia
← National 13	→ National 15

Indonesian National Route 14 starts from Semarang on the north coast of Java and ends at Yogyakarta to the south.

It passes through mountain scenery as it proceeds through the Kedu Plain between the Merapi - Merbabu complex to the east, and Sumbing to the west.

== Route ==
Semarang – Ungaran – Bergas – Bawen – Ambarawa – Jambu – Pringsurat – Secang – Magelang – Mertoyudan – Muntilan – Salam - Sleman – Yogyakarta

== Description ==
It passes the city of Salak Fruit, Sleman. Near Mungkid, Central Java, this highway provides an entrance to Mendut and Borobudur Temples, and then the highway enters Magelang.

In Secang, Indonesian National Route 9 leading for Purwokerto diverges. After that it passes Bedono, where the Pesantren of Miftahul Jannah, owned by Pujiono Cahyo Widianto (better known as Syekh Puji), a controversial ulema and entrepreneur, is located. The highway also provides a way to view scenic Ambarawa and Rawa Pening. This National highway ends at Semarang, which is known for its Lawang Sewu, Bandeng Fish and lunpia.

The route of the former railway from Yogyakarta to Magelang runs close to the highway route, and in places former railway bridges and railway lines can be seen.
