= Indonesian National Route 17 =

Road in Indonesia

Nasional 17

Major junctions
- West end: Tuban
- National 1
- East end: Gresik

Location
- Country: Indonesia

Highway system
- Transport in Indonesia
| ← National 16 | → National 18 |

Indonesian National Route 17 is a national route in Java connect Tuban with Gresik.

== Route ==
Tuban-Paciran-Sidayu-Gresik
