= Indonesian National Route 21 =

Road in Indonesia

Nasional 21

Route information
- Length: 175 km (109 mi)

Major junctions
- West end: Bangkalan
- East end: Sumenep

Location
- Country: Indonesia

Highway system
- Transport in Indonesia
← National 20	→ National 22

Indonesian National Route 21 is a national road in Madura.

== Route ==
Kamal—Bangkalan—Sampang—Torjun—Pamekasan—Sumenep—Kalianget
