= Indonesian National Route 10 =

Road in Indonesia

Nasional 10

Route information
- Length: 8 km (5.0 mi)

Major junctions
- North end: Banyumas
- National 3 National 9
- South end: Buntu

Location
- Country: Indonesia

Highway system
- Transport in Indonesia
| ← National 9 | → National 11 |

Indonesian National Route 10 is a relatively short road in the national route system that completely lies in the Central Java province, and connects Banyumas on the northern end, with Buntu in the southern end.

== Route ==
Banyumas - Buntu
