= Indonesian National Route 9 =

Road in Indonesia

Nasional 9

Route information
- Length: 177 km (110 mi)

Major junctions
- West end: Ajibarang
- National 6 National 8 National 10; National 14
- East end: Secang

Location
- Country: Indonesia

Highway system
- Transport in Indonesia
← National 8	→ National 10

Indonesian National Route 9 is a main road which connects Ajibarang and Secang. The route is a middle route which passes Dieng Plateau and located in Central Java.

== Route ==
Ajibarang - Purwokerto - Sokaraja - Kaliori - Banyumas - Klampok - Banjarnegara - Selokromo - Wonosobo - Kretek - Parakan - Bulu - Kedu - Temanggung - Kranggan - Secang
