= Indonesian National Route 15 =

Road in Indonesia

Nasional 15

Major junctions
- West end: Depok
- Indonesian National Route 1 Indonesian National Route 14; Indonesian National Route 16; Indonesian National Route 20; Indonesian National Route 22; Indonesian National Route 24
- East end: Waru

Location
- Country: Indonesia

Highway system
- Transport in Indonesia
← National 14	→ National 16

National Route 15 in Java is one of major road network of Indonesian National Routes in Yogyakarta, Central Java and East Java connecting Yogyakarta to Surabaya.

== Route description ==
National Route 15 connects Yogyakarta to Surabaya through Surakarta and Ngawi. Starting at Depok, Yogyakarta connects with National Route 14 and ends at Waru, Sidoarjo, Surabaya. Starting at Sleman Regency north of Yogyakarta City, it intersects with National Route 14 at a roundabout interchange. It also intersects National Route 3. It connects with National Route 16 with a roundabout on Kartasura.

The Surakarta-Surabaya section of the route is a part of AH2.
