= Indonesian National Route 6 =

Road in Indonesia

Nasional 6

Route information
- Length: 132 km (82 mi)

Major junctions
- North end: Tegal
- National 1 National 3 National 8 National 9
- South end: Cilacap

Location
- Country: Indonesia

Highway system
- Transport in Indonesia
← National 5	→ National 7

Indonesian National Route 6 is a main road in Java Island which connects Tegal and Cilacap.

== Route ==
Tegal - Slawi - Prupuk - Bumiayu - Ajibarang - Wangon - Gumilir - Cilacap
