= Indonesian National Route 4 =

Road in Indonesia

Nasional 4

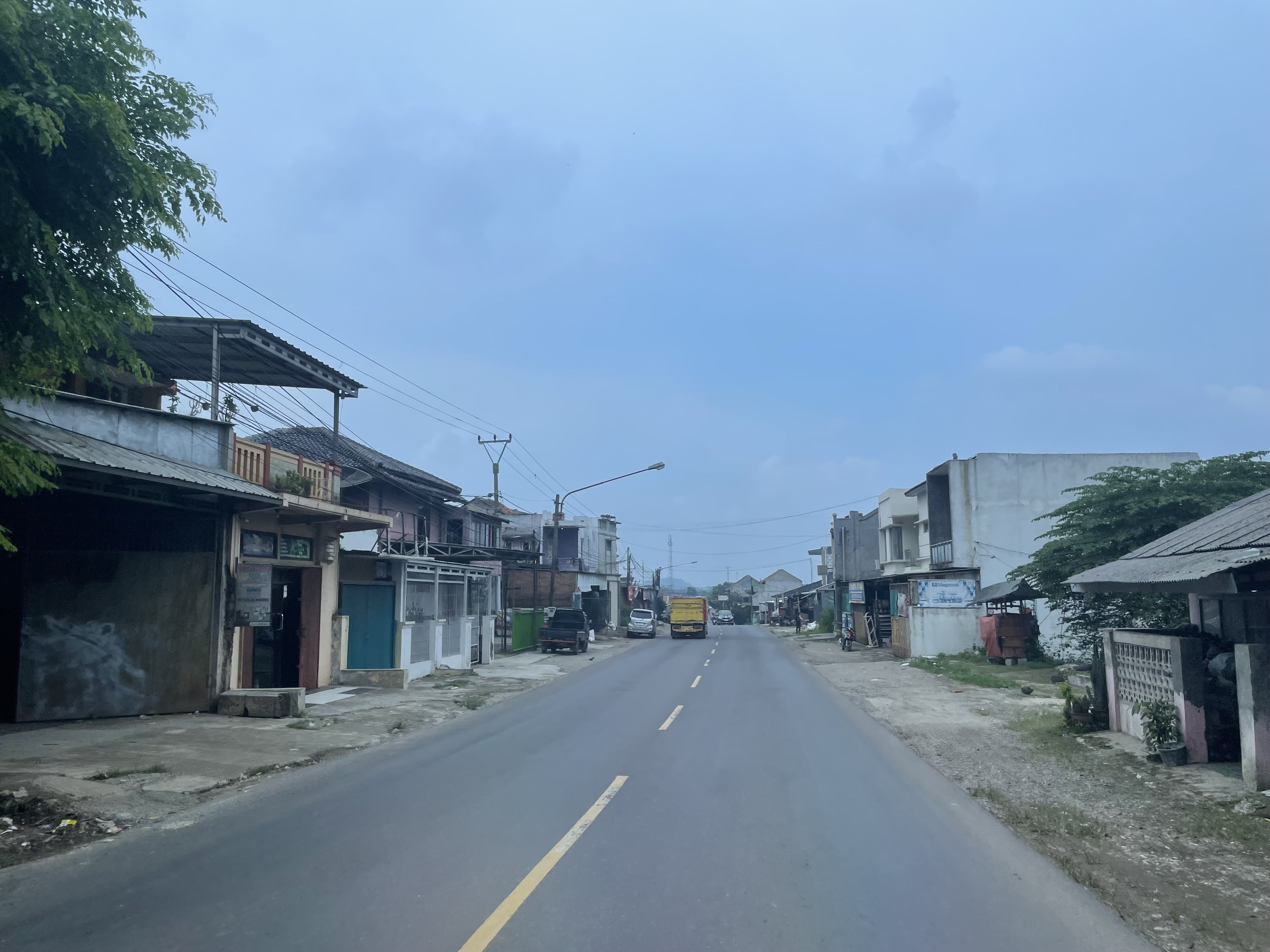

Major junctions
- North end: Cikampek
- National 1 National 3
- South end: Padalarang

Location
- Country: Indonesia

Highway system
- Transport in Indonesia
← National 3	→ National 5

Indonesian National Route 4 is a road stretching from Cikampek to Padalarang. It was more frequently used before the Cipularang Toll Road was built. It connects Cikampek and Padalarang.

== Route ==
Cikampek - Cikopo - Sadang - Purwakarta - Plered - Cikalongwetan - Padalarang
