= Indonesian National Route 23 =

Road in Indonesia

Nasional 23

Route information
- Length: 72 km (45 mi)

Major junctions
- North end: Gempol
- National 1 National 3 National 24
- South end: Kepanjen

Location
- Country: Indonesia

Highway system
- Transport in Indonesia
| ← National 22 | → National 24 |

Indonesian National Route 23 is a national route in Java connect Gempol in North with Kepanjen in South

== Route ==
Gempol-Pandaan-Lawang-Singosari-Malang-Kepanjen
