= Indonesian National Route 19 =

Road in Indonesia

Nasional 19

Route information
- Length: 32 km (20 mi)

Major junctions
- West end: Merak
- National 1 National 3
- East end: Kramatwatu

Location
- Country: Indonesia

Highway system
- Transport in Indonesia
← National 18	→ National 20

indonesian National Route 19 is a national route in Java connect Merak with Kramatwatu.

== Route ==
Merak-Bojonegara-Kramatwatu
