= Indonesian National Route 18 =

Road in Indonesia

Nasional 18

Major junctions
- North end: Banjar
- National 3
- South end: Pangandaran

Location
- Country: Indonesia

Highway system
- Transport in Indonesia
← National 17	→ National 19

Indonesian National Route 18 is a national route in Java connect Banjar with Pangandaran

== Route ==
Banjar-Kalipucang-Pangandaran
