= Sayung =

District in Central Java, Indonesia

- District
- Interactive map of Sayung
- Coordinates: 6°56′31.1424″S 110°30′29.5427″E
- Country: Indonesia
- Province: Central Java
- Regency: Demak

Area
  - Total: 85.97 km^{2} (33.19 sq mi)

Population (2020)
  - Total: 105,712
  - Density: 1,230/km^{2} (3,185/sq mi)
- Time zone: UTC+07:00 (IWST)
- Postal code: 59563

Sayung is an administrative district (kecamatan) in Demak Regency, Central Java, Indonesia. Sayung is approximately 14 km from the capital of Demak Regency to the west. Sayung district borders directly with Semarang City and the Java Sea .
