= Trenggalek (district) =

Trenggalek District Kecamatan Trenggalek
- District
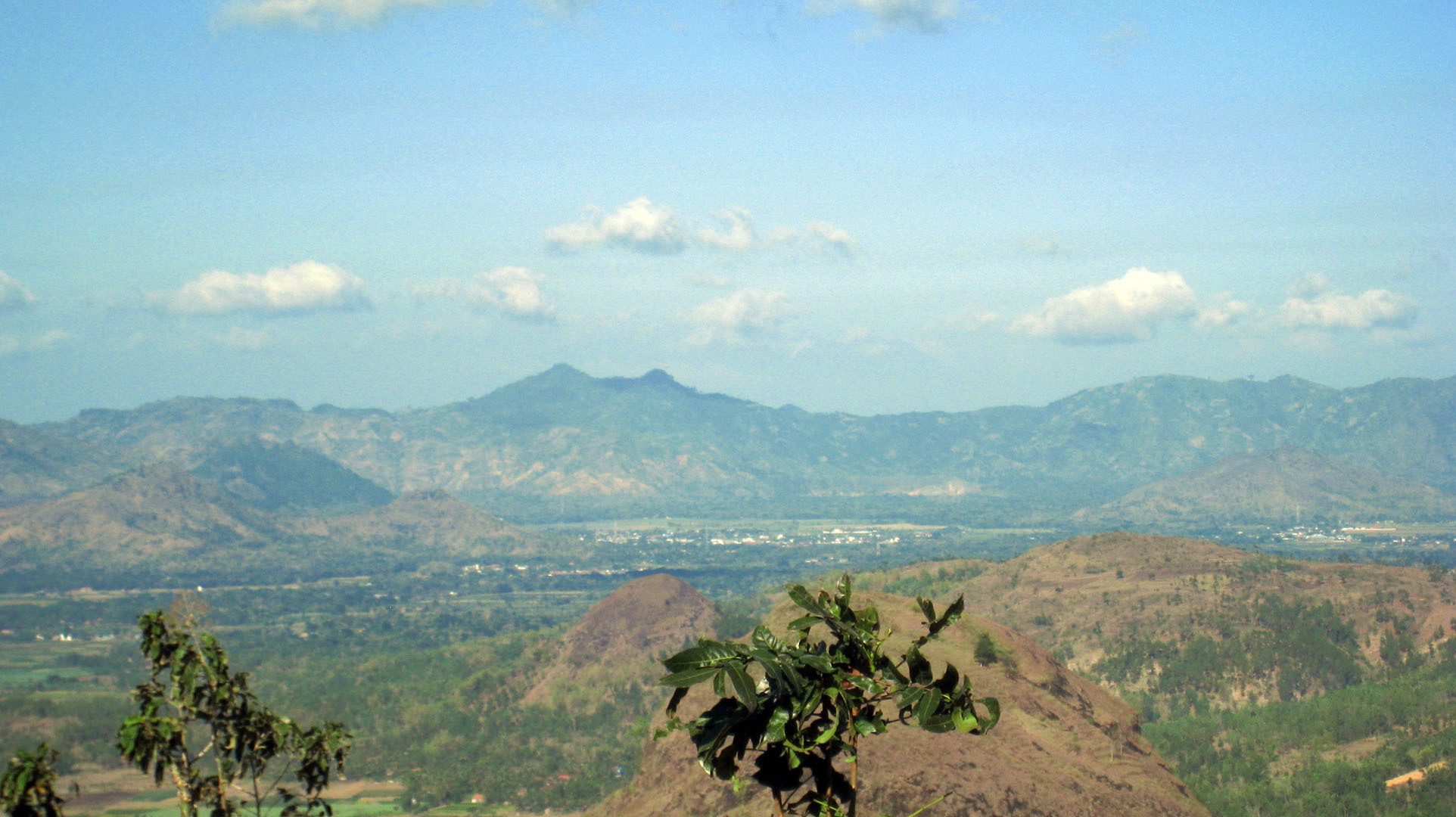
- Skyline of Trenggalek Kota
- Interactive map of Trenggalek District
- Coordinates: 8°03′S 111°43′E
- Country: Indonesia
- Province: East Java
- Elevation: 110 m (360 ft)
- Time zone: UTC+7 (WIB)
- Website: www.trenggalekkab.go.id

Kecamatan Trenggalek is a district (kecamatan) in East Java, Indonesia. It serves as the government and economic centre of Trenggalek Regency.

== Climate ==
Trenggalek has a tropical monsoon climate (Am) with moderate to little rainfall from June to October and heavy rainfall from November to May.

Climate data for Trenggalek
Month	Jan	Feb	Mar	Apr	May	Jun	Jul	Aug	Sep	Oct	Nov	Dec	Year
Mean daily maximum °C (°F)	29.5 (85.1)	29.6 (85.3)	29.9 (85.8)	30.5 (86.9)	30.6 (87.1)	30.8 (87.4)	30.4 (86.7)	30.9 (87.6)	31.7 (89.1)	32.0 (89.6)	31.0 (87.8)	30.1 (86.2)	30.6 (87.1)
Daily mean °C (°F)	25.6 (78.1)	25.6 (78.1)	25.8 (78.4)	26.1 (79.0)	25.8 (78.4)	25.5 (77.9)	24.8 (76.6)	25.0 (77.0)	25.8 (78.4)	26.4 (79.5)	26.1 (79.0)	25.8 (78.4)	25.7 (78.2)
Mean daily minimum °C (°F)	21.7 (71.1)	21.7 (71.1)	21.8 (71.2)	21.7 (71.1)	21.1 (70.0)	20.2 (68.4)	19.3 (66.7)	19.2 (66.6)	20.0 (68.0)	20.8 (69.4)	21.3 (70.3)	21.6 (70.9)	20.9 (69.6)
Average rainfall mm (inches)	315 (12.4)	278 (10.9)	304 (12.0)	216 (8.5)	161 (6.3)	83 (3.3)	66 (2.6)	36 (1.4)	55 (2.2)	123 (4.8)	168 (6.6)	255 (10.0)	2,060 (81)
Source: Climate-Data.org

== See also ==
- Districts of Indonesia
