= Mani Yar =

Mani Yar مني ير
- Village
- Location within Iran
- Coordinates: 31°48′27″N 49°46′03″E
- Country: Iran
- Province: Khuzestan
- County: Izeh
- Bakhsh: Central
- Rural District: Holayjan

Population (2006)
  - Total: 61
- Time zone: UTC+3:30 (IRST)
  - Summer (DST): UTC+4:30 (IRDT)

Mani Yar (Persian: مني ير, also Romanized as Manī Yar; also known as Manyar) is a village in Holayjan Rural District, in the Central District of Izeh County, Khuzestan Province, Iran. At the 2006 census, its population was 61, in 11 families.
