= Babat =

Village in Budaun, Uttar Pradesh

- village
- Location in Uttar Pradesh, India Babat (India)
- Coordinates: 28.115596°N 79.119875°E
- Country: India
- State: Uttar Pradesh
- District: Badaun

Government
  - Body: Gram panchayat

Languages
  - Official: Hindi
- Time zone: UTC+5:30 (IST)
- PIN: 243601
- Vehicle registration: UP 24

Babat is a village in Salarpur block, Budaun district, Uttar Pradesh, India. The Budaun railway station is located at the distance of 10 kilometer from the village. Babat village is administrated by Gram panchayat. Its village code is 128242. According to 2011 Census of India, the total population of the village is 2586, out of 1,387 are males and 1,199 are females.
