= Trenggalek Regency =

Regency in East Java, Indonesia

Trenggalek Regency Kabupaten Trenggalek
- Regency

Other transcription(s)
  - Javanese: Trênggalèk (Gêdrig) ترۤڠڮالَيك (Pégon) ꦠꦽꦁꦒꦭꦺꦏ꧀ (Hånåcåråkå)
- Coat of arms
- Motto: Jwalita Praja Karana ꦗ꧀ꦮꦭꦶꦠꦥꦿꦗꦏꦫꦤ (Brilliant because of the people)
- Location within Indonesia
- Coordinates: 8°03′S 111°43′E
- Country: Indonesia
- Province: East Java

Government
  - Regent: Mochamad Nur Arifin
  - Vice Regent: Syah Muhammad Nata Negara

Area
  - Total: 1,246.59 km^{2} (481.31 sq mi)
- Elevation: 110 m (360 ft)
- Highest elevation: 2,563 m (8,409 ft)
- Lowest elevation: 0 m (0 ft)

Population (mid 2025 estimate)
  - Total: 754,257
  - Density: 605.056/km^{2} (1,567.09/sq mi)
- Time zone: UTC+7
- Website: trenggalekkab.go.id

Trenggalek Regency (Indonesian: Kabupaten Trenggalek; Javanese: ꦏꦧꦸꦥꦠꦺꦤ꧀ꦠꦽꦁꦒꦭꦺꦏ꧀) is a regency (kabupaten) in East Java Province of Indonesia.

The regency has an area of 1,246.59 km^{2} and had a population of 674,411 residents at the 2010 Census and 731,125 at the 2020 Census; the official estimate as of mid 2025 was 754,257 (comprising 378,848 males and 375,409 females). It is located on the southern shore of East Java and is surrounded by three regencies: Ponorogo Regency to the northwest; Pacitan Regency to the southwest; and Tulungagung Regency to the north and east. The administrative centre is located in the district (kecamatan) of Trenggalek.

== Geography ==
Trenggalek is a regency that is located on the southern shore of Java island and has the following geographical boundaries:

- To the northwest: Ponorogo Regency;
- To the southwest: Pacitan Regency;
- To the east: Tulungagung Regency;
- To the south: Indian Ocean, and
- To the north: Mount Wilis.

== Administrative districts ==
The Regency is divided into fourteen districts (kecamatan), tabulated below with their areas and their population totals from the 2010 Census and the 2020 Census, together with the official estimates as of mid 2025. The table also includes the locations of the district headquarters, the number of administrative villages in each district (totaling 152 rural desa and 5 urban kelurahan - the latter all in Trenggalek (town) District), and its postal codes.

| Kode Wilayah | Name of District (kecamatan) | Area in km^{2} | Pop'n Census 2010 | Pop'n Census 2020 | Pop'n Estimate mid 2025 | Admin centre | No. of villages | Post codes |
|---|---|---|---|---|---|---|---|---|
| 35.03.01 | Panggul ^{(a)} | 131.99 | 69,325 | 78,344 | 81,244 | Wonocoyo | 17 | 66364 |
| 35.03.02 | Munjungan ^{(b)} | 147.86 | 46,916 | 52,908 | 54,572 | Munjungan | 11 | 66365 |
| 35.03.08 | Watulimo ^{(c)} | 155.35 | 62,625 | 70,002 | 72,449 | Prigi | 12 | 66382 |
| 35.03.07 | Kampak | 77.77 | 35,743 | 37,201 | 38,261 | Bendoagung | 7 | 66373 |
| 35.03.04 | Dongko | 143.48 | 59,248 | 65,505 | 68,012 | Dongko | 10 | 66363 |
| 35.03.03 | Pule | 117.48 | 50,908 | 55,822 | 57,553 | Pule | 10 | 66362 |
| 35.03.06 | Karangan | 47.13 | 45,432 | 49,930 | 50,630 | Karangan | 12 | 66361 |
| 35.03.14 | Suruh | 53.19 | 24,546 | 26,028 | 26,782 | Suruh | 7 | 66360 |
| 35.03.10 | Gandusari | 53.86 | 49,082 | 52,560 | 54,063 | Gandusari | 11 | 66372 |
| 35.03.13 | Durenan ^{(d)} | 48.79 | 48,985 | 51,320 | 52,122 | Kendalrejo | 14 | 66381 |
| 35.03.12 | Pogalan | 47.98 | 47,951 | 52,234 | 53,692 | Ngadirenggo | 10 | 66371 |
| 35.03.11 | Trenggalek (town) | 58.78 | 62,606 | 64,306 | 66,931 | Ngantru | 15 ^{(e)} | 66311: 66319 |
| 35.03.05 | Tugu | 70.69 | 45,764 | 47,829 | 49,423 | Gondang | 15 | 66352 ^{(f)} |
| 35.03.09 | Bendungan | 92.26 | 25,280 | 27,136 | 28,523 | Dompyong | 8 | 66351 |
| | Totals | 1,246.59 | 674,411 | 731,125 | 754,257 | | 157 | |

Notes: (a) including 11 small offshore islands. (b) including 23 small offshore islands. (c) including 23 small offshore islands.
(d) Durenan District forms a geographical salient projecting eastwards into Tugungagung Regency.
(e) comprising 5 urban kelurahan (Kelutan, Ngantru, Sumbergedong, Surodakan and Tamanan) and 10 desa.
(f) except for the village of Banaran, which has a post code of 66318.

== Commodities ==
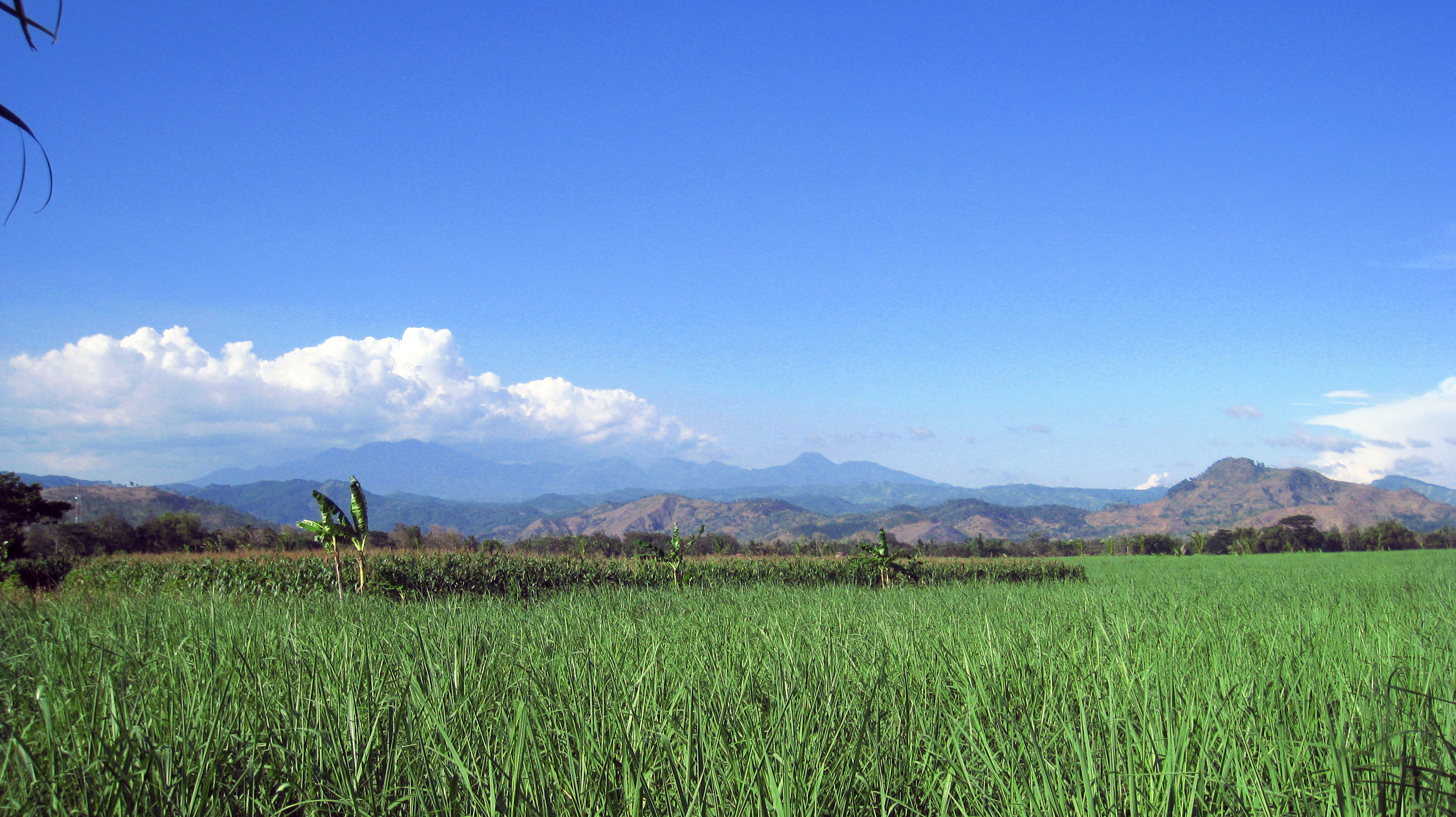
A typical paddy field in Trenggalek Regency, Indonesia

Agricultural produce in the area includes rice, corn, cassava, soya beans, and legumes. Plantations produce sugar cane, cloves, durians, salak, mangosteens, and rambutans. Industrial outputs include soy sauce, syrup, tapioca, anchovies, batik, snacks, cigarettes, sawmill, building materials, roofs, and tofu.

== Gallery ==
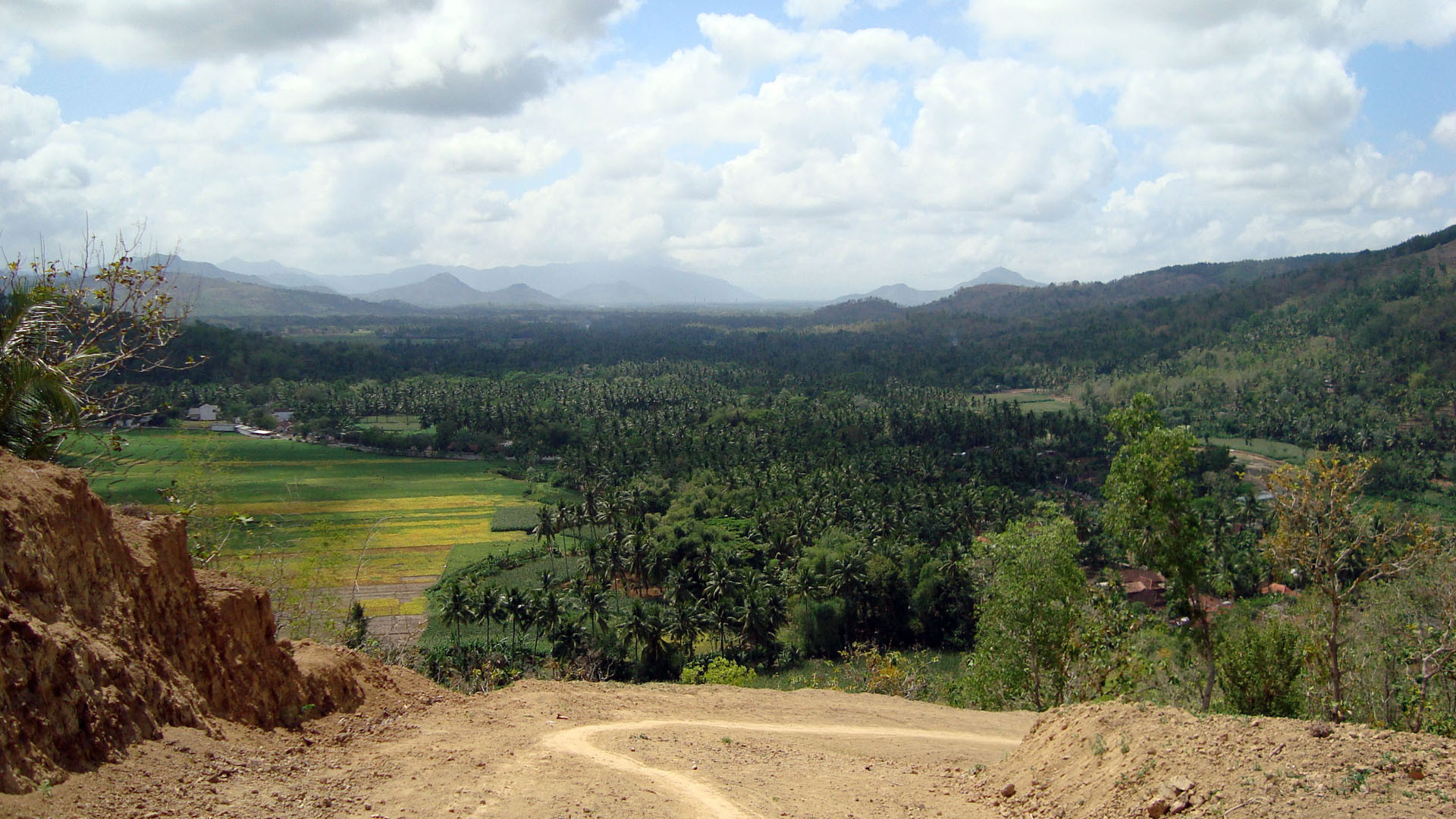
A view over Pucanganak village in western Trenggalek Regency

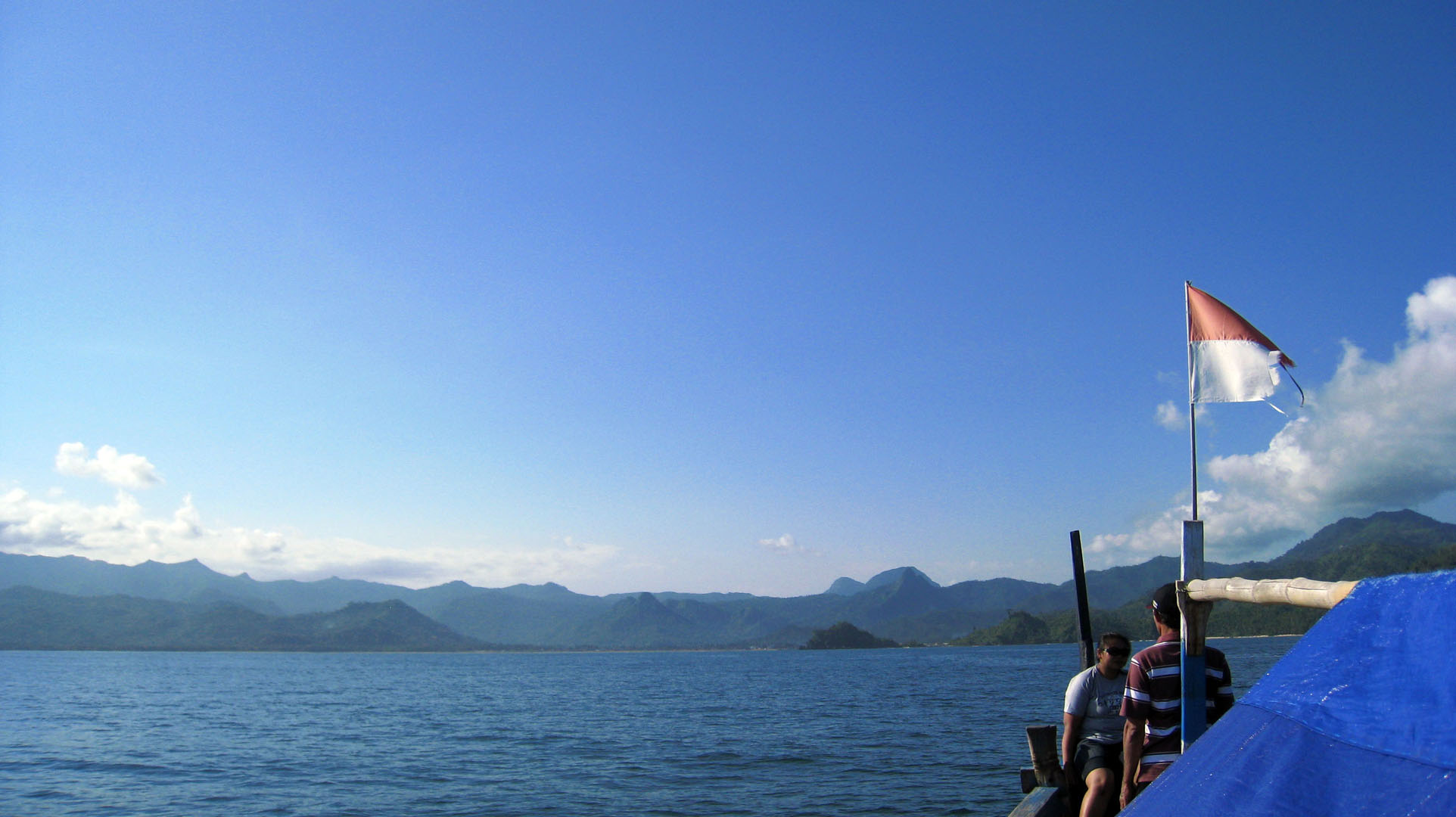
Traditional boats are popular among tourists on Prigi beach

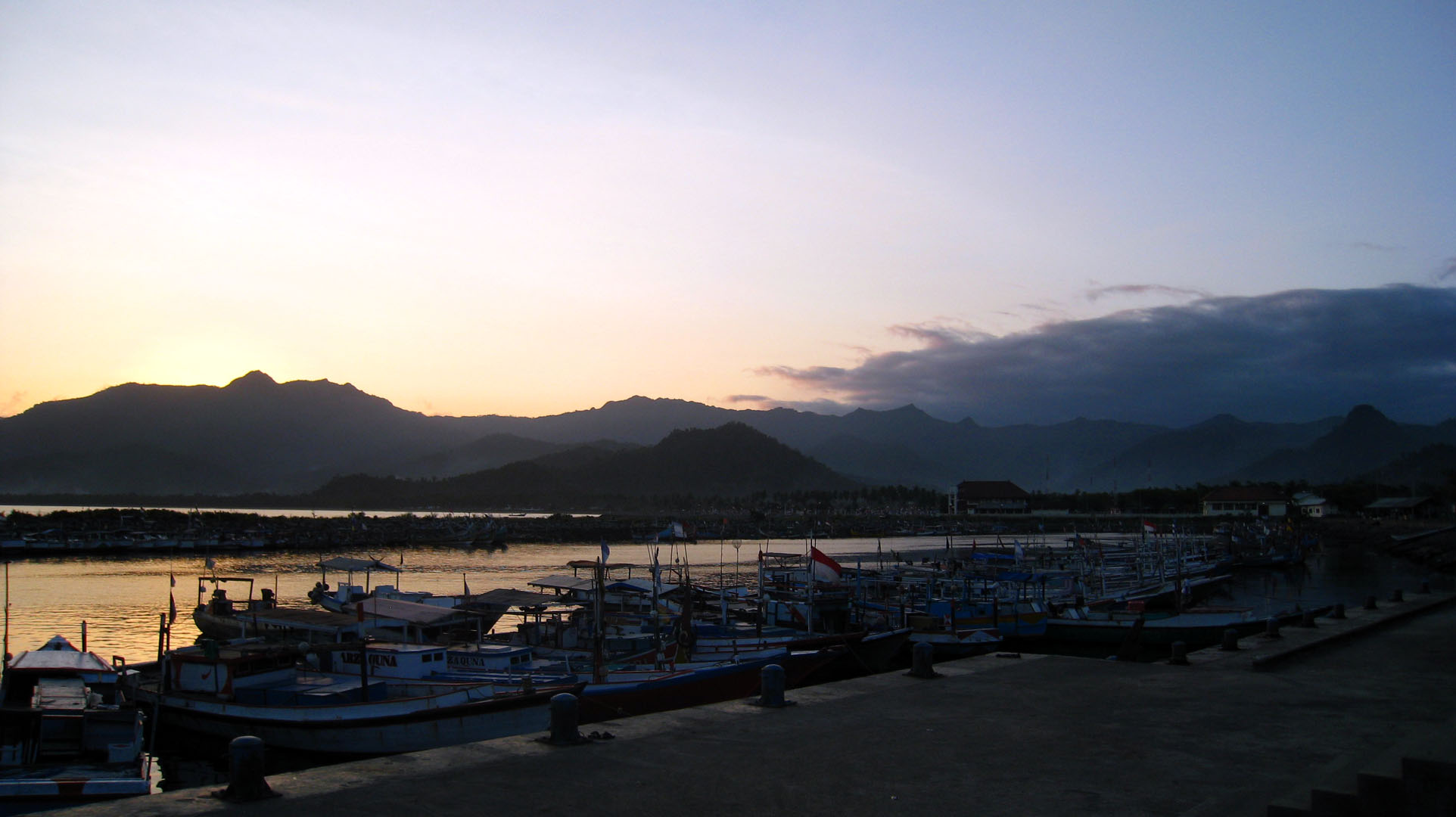
Sunset on Prigi pier

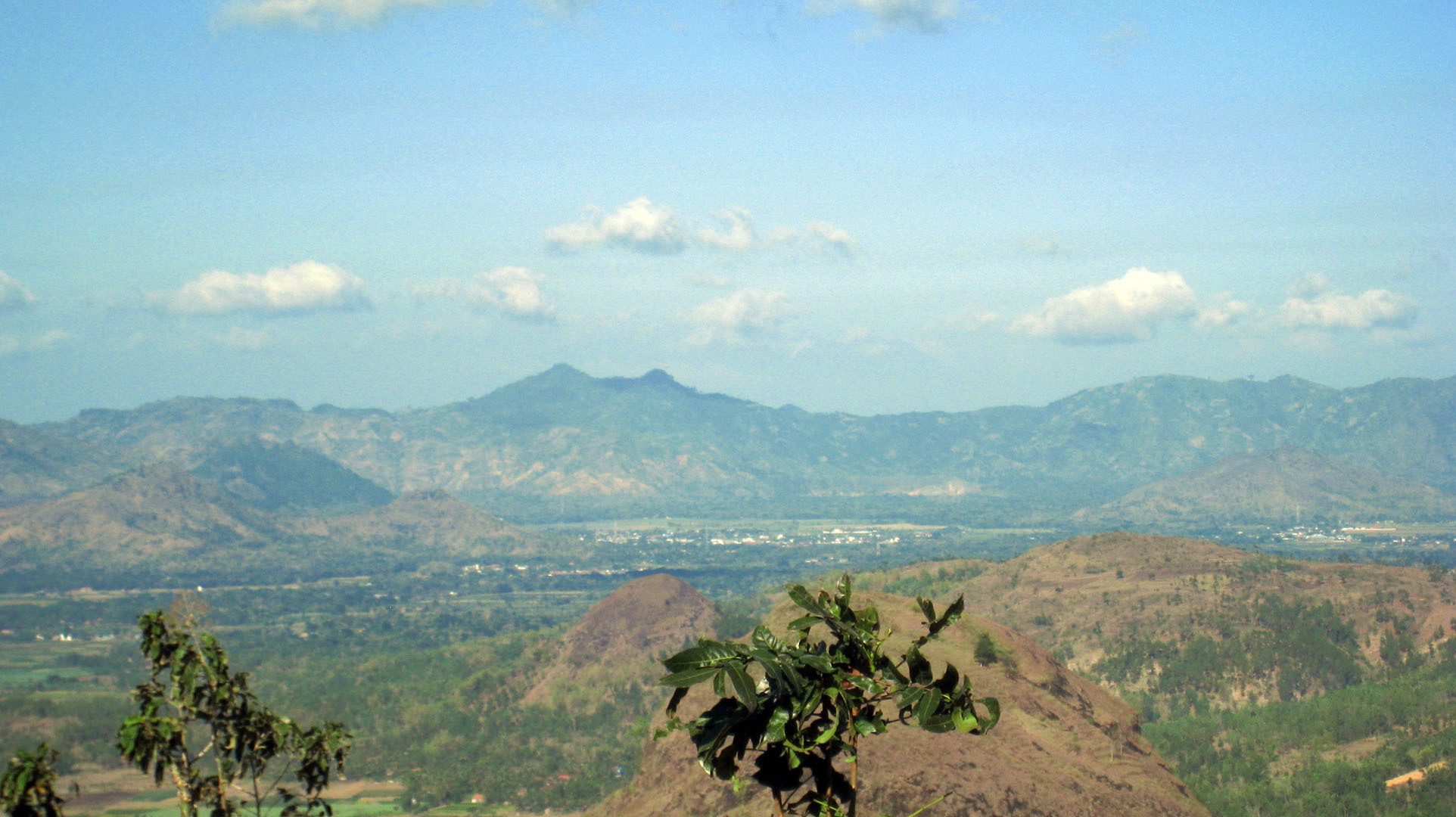
Skyline of Trenggalek Kota

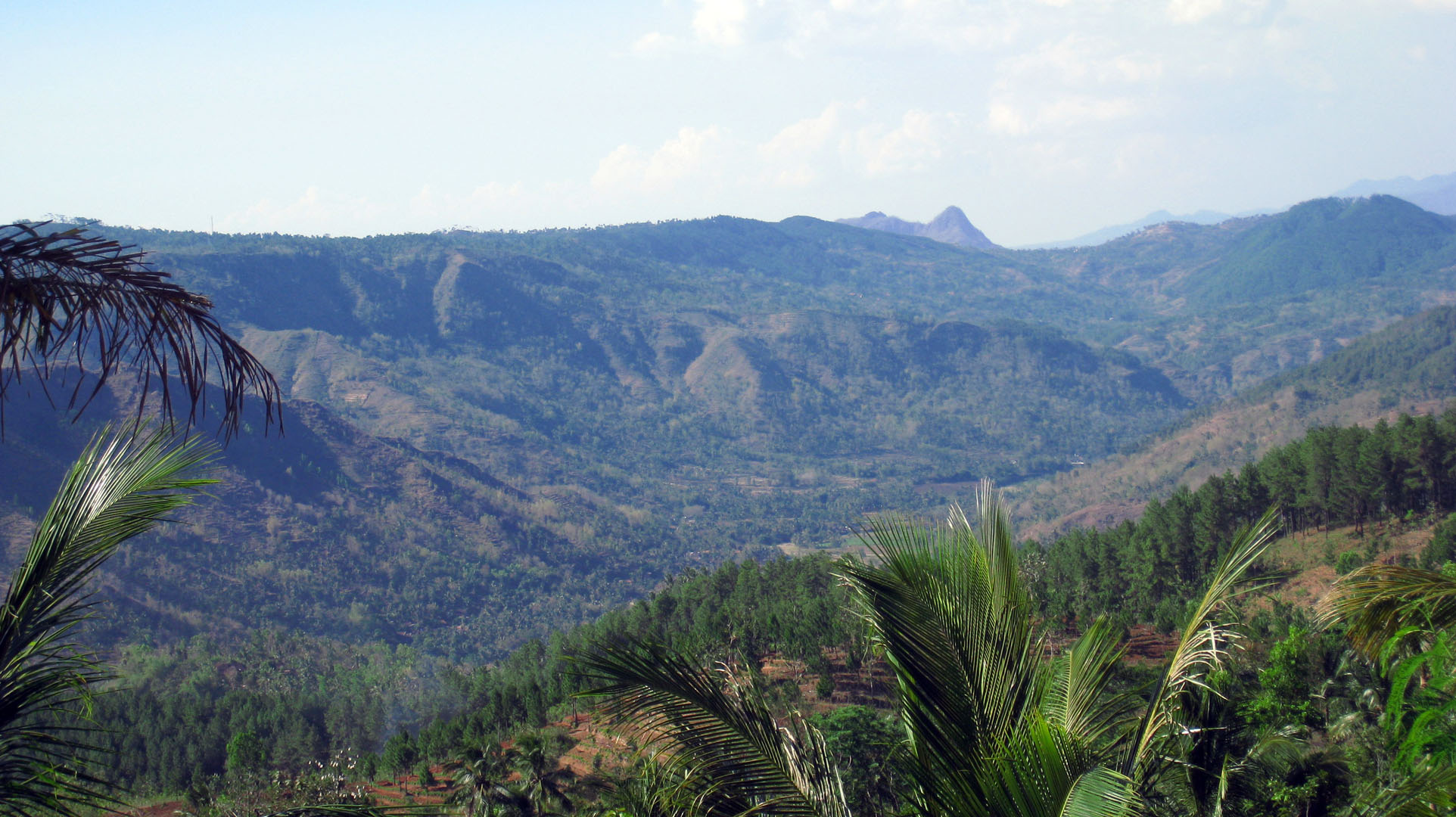
Highlands in western Trenggalek Regency

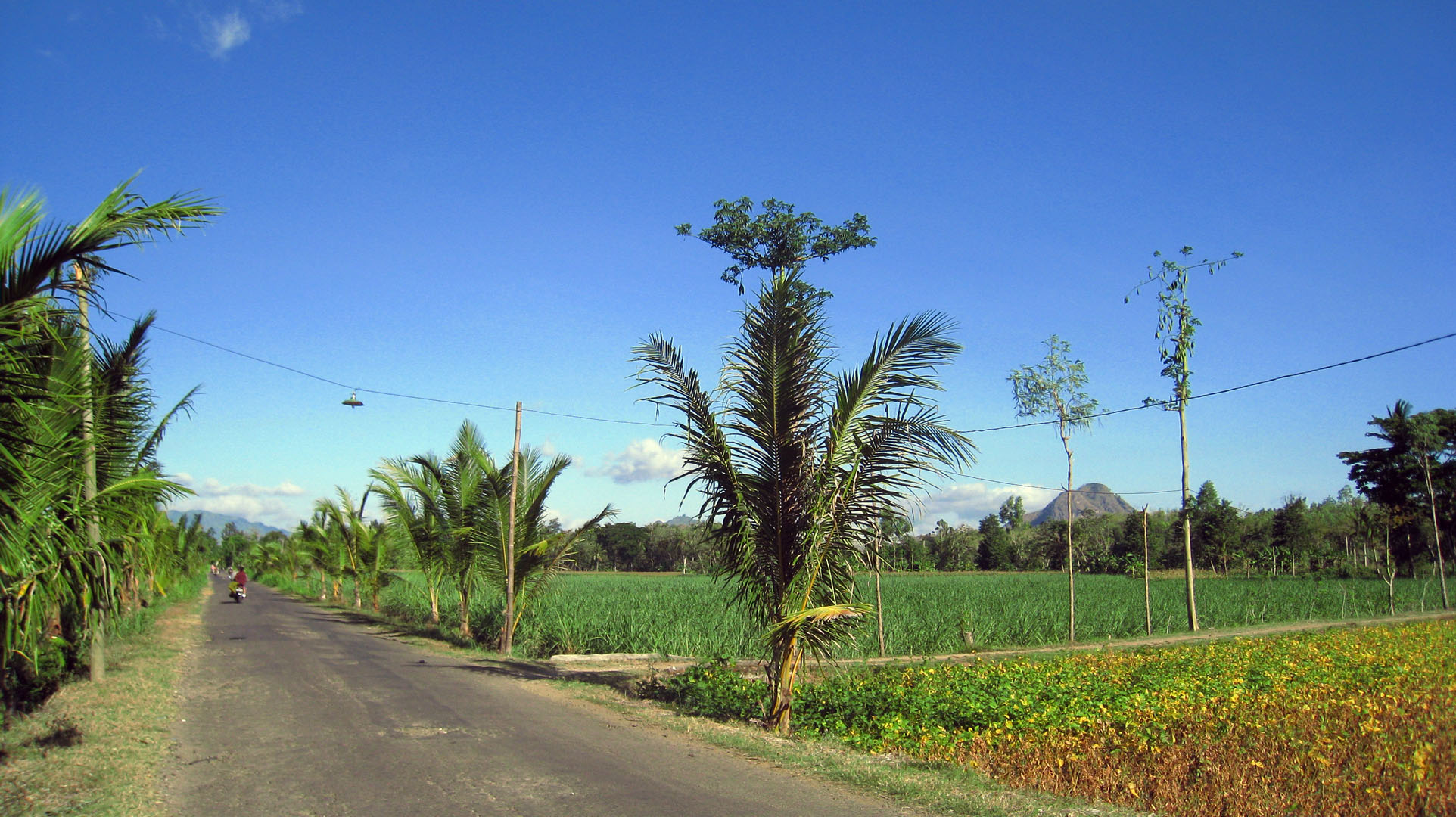
Plantations in a typical village

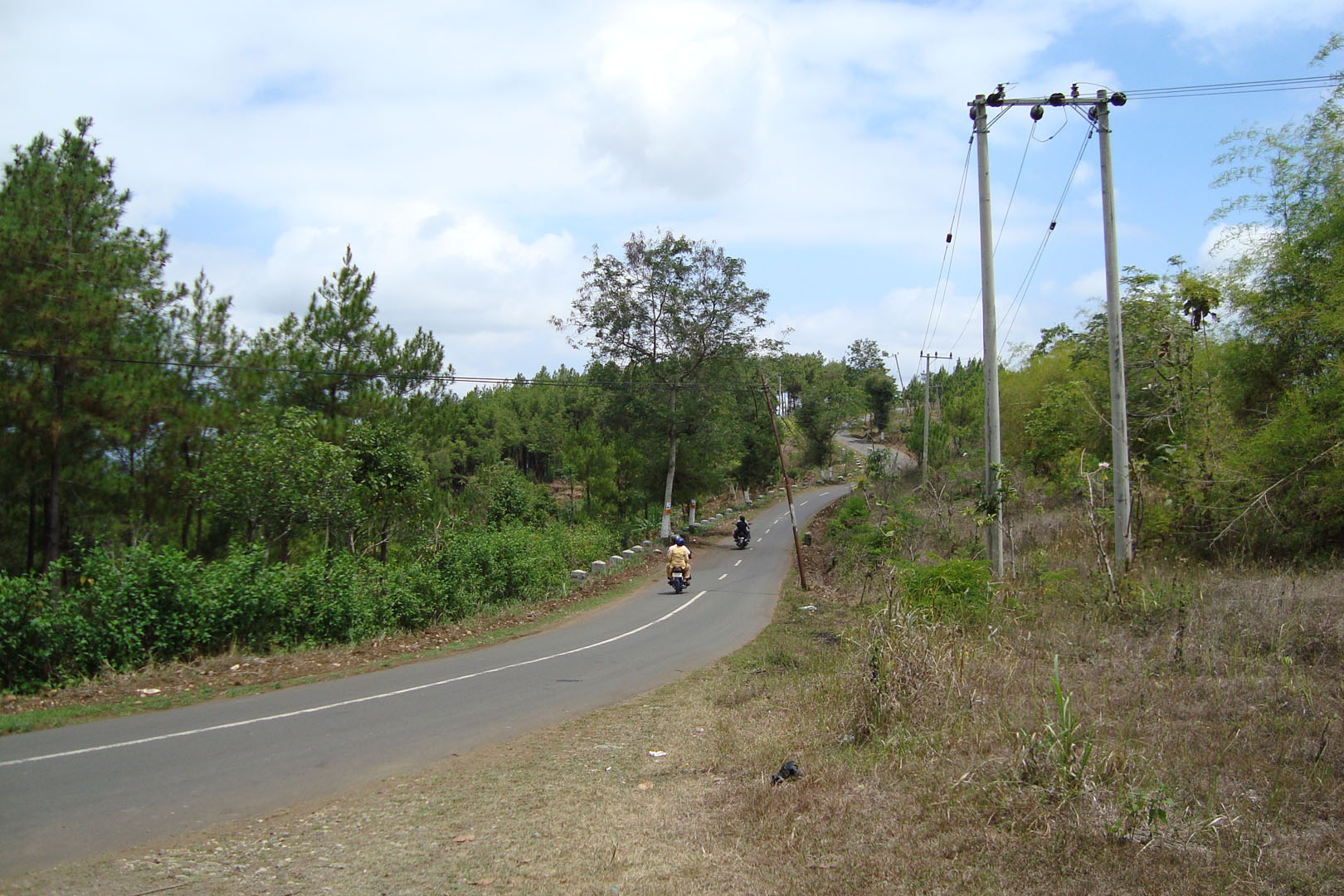
Winding road to Bendungan district in northern Trenggalek Regency

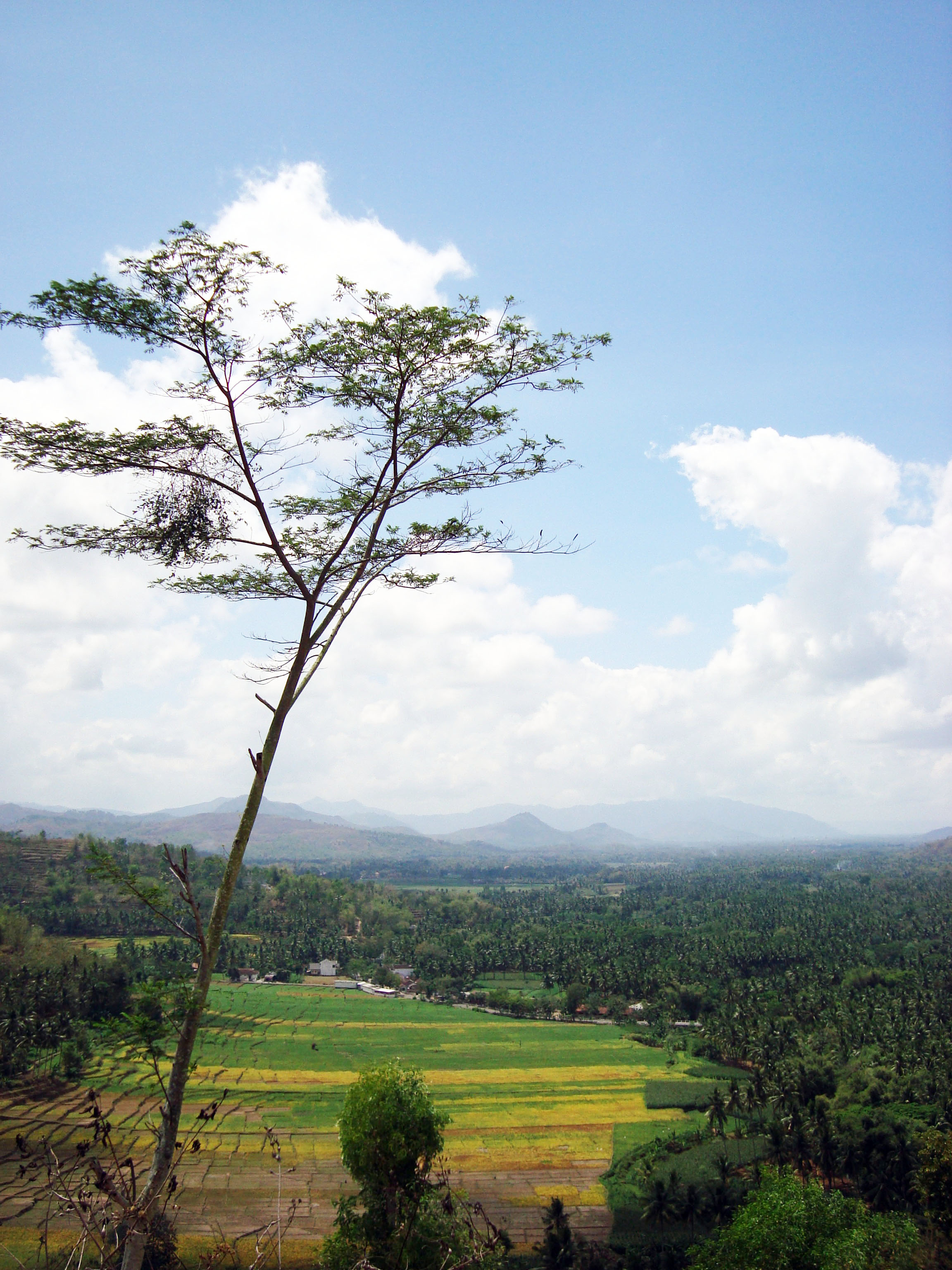
Village in Trenggalek Regency

== See also ==
- List of regencies and cities of Indonesia
