= Indonesian National Route 16 =

Road in Indonesia

Nasional 16

Route information
- Length: 56 km (35 mi)

Major junctions
- North end: Bawen
- National 14; National 15
- South end: Kartasura

Location
- Country: Indonesia

Highway system
- Transport in Indonesia
| ← National 15 | → National 17 |

Indonesian National Route 16 is national route in Java connect Bawen with Kartasura. This route part of AH2

== Route ==
Bawen-Salatiga-Boyolali-Kartasura
