= Kediri =

Kediri can refer to:

- Kediri (historical kingdom), a medieval kingdom occupying territory in present-day Indonesia
- Kediri (city), a modern-day city in East Java, Indonesia
  - The Kediri meteorite of c. 1940, which fell in East Java, Indonesia (see meteorite falls)
- Kediri Regency, a kabupaten in East Java, Indonesia
- Kediri, Bali, a district (kecamatan) of Bali, Indonesia
- Persedikab Kediri, an association football club based in Kediri Regency
- Persik Kediri, an association football club based in Kediri, East Java
