= Indramayu Regency =

Regency in West Java, Indonesia

Indramayu Regency Kabupaten Indramayu Dermayu
- Regency

Regional transcription(s)
  - Javanese: ꦏꦧꦸꦥꦠꦺꦤ꧀ꦆꦤ꧀ꦢꦿꦩꦪꦸ
  - Sundanese: ᮊᮘᮥᮕᮒᮦᮔ᮪ ᮄᮔ᮪ᮓᮢᮙᮚᮥ
- Coat of arms
- Motto(s): Religius, Maju, Mandiri dan Sejahtera; Religious, Advanced, Independent, Affluent
- Location within West Java

- Location in Java and Indonesia Indramayu Regency (Indonesia)
- Coordinates: 6°19′35″S 108°19′22″E
- Country: Indonesia
- Province: West Java

Government
  - Regent: Lucky Hakim
  - Vice Regent: Syaefudin

Area
  - Total: 2,078.03 km^{2} (802.33 sq mi)

Population (mid 2025 estimate)
  - Total: 1,950,316
  - Density: 938.541/km^{2} (2,430.81/sq mi)

Demographics
  - Language: Indonesian (official); Javanese (Cirebon dialect); Sundanese (Parean–Lelea dialect)
  - Religion: Islam (majority)
- Time zone: UTC+7 (WIB)
- Area code: +62 234
- Website: indramayukab.go.id

Indramayu Regency is a regency (kabupaten) of the West Java province of Indonesia. It covers an area of 2,078.03 km^{2} and had a population of 1,663,737 at the 2010 census and 1,834,434 at the 2020 census; the official estimate as of mid 2025 was 1,950,316 (comprising 976,940 males and 973,376 females). The town of Indramayu is its capital.

This regency is located in the northeastern corner of West Java. Its borders include:
North and East: Java Sea
South: Cirebon Regency, Majalengka Regency and Sumedang Regency
West: Subang Regency.

== Administrative division ==
Indramayu Regency is administratively divided into thirty-one districts (kecamatan), listed below with their areas and their populations at the 2010 census and the 2020 census, together with the official estimates as of mid 2024. The table also includes the locations of the district administrative centres, the number of administrative villages in each district (totaling 309 rural desa and 8 urban kelurahan - the latter all in Indramayu (town) District), and its post codes.

Kode Wilayah	Name of District (kecamatan)	Area in km^{2}	Pop'n 2010 census	Pop'n 2020 census	Pop'n mid 2024 estimate	Admin centre	No. of villages	Post code(s)
32.12.01	Haurgeulis	63.96	87,832	91,833	93,800	Haurgeulis	7	45266
32.12.25	Gantar	172.04	60,573	61,190	61,670	Gantar	7	45264
32.12.02	Kroya	135.23	60,437	66,012	68,570	Kroya	9	45265
32.12.03	Gabuswetan	77.75	53,864	58,297	60,340	Gabuskulon	10	45263
32.12.04	Cikedung	113.07	38,580	41,024	42,180	Cikedung	7	45262
32.12.26	Terisi	167.73	52,516	56,715	58,660	Terisi	9	45260
32.12.05	Lelea	61.62	46,851	48,671	49,590	Lelea	11	45261
32.12.06	Bangodua	43.71	26,950	30,174	31,650	Wanasari	8	45272
32.12.30	Tukdana	75.29	49,916	56,966	60,190	Tukdana	14	45270
32.12.07	Widasari	40.14	33,489	37,688	39,610	Kongaijaya	10	45271
32.12.08	Kertasemaya	38.39	59,700	63,132	64,770	Tulungagung	13	45274
32.12.27	Sukagumiwang	33.02	36,805	36,460	36,600	Sukagumiwang	7	45275
32.12.09	Krangkeng	73.66	62,354	68,041	70,650	Krangkeng	11	45284
32.12.10	Karangampel	30.73	61,020	69,329	73,130	Karangampel	11	45283
32.12.28	Kedokan Bunder	31.77	43,378	49,020	51,600	Kedokanbunder	7	45280
32.12.11	Juntinyuat	53.70	76,199	88,307	93,860	Juntikebon	12	45282
32.12.12	Sliyeg	54.40	57,674	63,810	66,620	Sliyeg	14	45281
32.12.13	Jatibarang	43.04	68,575	76,530	80,160	Bulak	15	45273
32.12.14	Balongan	35.83	37,918	46,150	49,990	Balongan	10	45217 & 45285
32.12.15	Indramayu (town)	53.58	106,390	119,558	125,570	Margadadi	^{(a)} 18	45211 - 45216; 45218 & 41219
32.12.16	Sindang	41.48	49,186	55,940	59,030	Sindang	10	45221 - 45227
32.12.17	Cantigi	84.90	22,465	30,776	34,900	Panyingkiran Kidul	7	45258 ^{(b)}
32.12.29	Pasekan ^{(c)}	64.33	23,362	28,024	30,190	Pasekan	6	45213, 45219, 45227 - 45229
32.12.18	Lohbener	38.68	53,716	57,699	59,550	Lohbener	12	45252
32.12.19	Arahan	32.72	31,305	35,818	37,880	Arahan Lor	8	45267
32.12.20	Losarang	108.48	54,872	54,862	55,080	Jangga	12	45253
32.12.21	Kandanghaur	87.72	84,433	93,647	97,860	Eretanwetan	7	45254 ^{(d)}
32.12.22	Bongas	49.90	45,982	50,633	52,760	Margamulya	8	45255
32.12.23	Anjatan	84.49	80,624	88,716	92,420	Anjatan	13	45256
32.12.24	Sukra	44.35	42,976	48,950	51,680	Sukra	8	45259
32.12.31	Patrol	42.34	53,795	60,462	63,510	Patrol	8	45257
	Totals	2,078.03	1,663,737	1,834,434	1,914,037	Indramayu	317	

Notes: (a) including 8 kelurahan (Bojongsari, Karanganyar, Karangmalang, Kepandean, Lemahabang, Lemahmekar, Margadadi and Paoman) and 10 desa.
(b) except the village of Cemara, which has a postcode of 45253.
(c) includes three small offshore islands - Pulau Biawak (which lies about 30 km off the north coast of Java), Pulau Candikian, and Pulau Gosongtengah.
(d) except for the village of Karanganyar, which has a post code of 45213.

== Climate ==
The Indramayu Regency has a tropical wet and dry Aw climate with two seasons, namely the rainy season and the dry season. The rainy season usually lasts from December to March. The dry season lasts from May to October. The average rainfall in the Indramayu Regency is 1300–1800 mm per year with the number of rainy days ranging from 90 to 140 rainy days per year. Due to its location on the coast, the average annual temperature of this area is quite high, ranging from 23° to 32 °C. The humidity level in most areas of Indramayu Regency ranges from 70 to 85% per year.

== Languages ==
In general, there are three regional languages used by the people of Indramayu Regency: Javanese (Indramayu Dialect), Sundanese (including Indramayu Sundanese language), and Indonesian. The Indramayu Javanese language (Indramayu Dialect) is spoken by the majority of the local population. Sundanese is spoken in some district (kecamatan). Indramayu Sundanese language is spoken in two districts: Lelea and Kandanghaur. In addition, some migrants from outside the region who have moved to Indramayu use Indonesian.
