= Cileunyi =

Coordinates: 6°59′58″S 107°37′17″E

- Interactive map of Cileunyi
- Country: Indonesia
- Province: West Java
- Regency: Bandung

Area
  - Total: 30.67 km^{2} (11.84 sq mi)

Population
  - Total: 184,397
  - Density: 6,012/km^{2} (15,570/sq mi)
- Time zone: UTC+7 (IWST)

Cileunyi is an administrative district (Kecamatan) in the Bandung Regency, in the West Java Province of Indonesia. The district is located immediately east of the major West Java city of Bandung. Cileunyi District has a varied topography, ranging from lower-lying areas along valleys or riverbanks to higher-elevation areas on hillsides and mountain peaks. The elevation of the area ranges from 600 metres above sea level to 1,200 metres above sea level. Although outside of the city itself, the district is highly urbanised, with a population of 184,397 people in 2025 (comprising 93,023 males and 91,374 females), and an average density of 6,012 per km^{2}.

== Administrative divisions ==
The Cileunyi District is divided into the following six administrative villages - all classed as nominally rural desa.

Kode wilayah	Village	Area in km^{2}	Population estimate 2025	Post code
32.04.05.2005	Cibiru Hilir	2.97	14,105	40626
32.04.05.2004	Cinunuk	5.04	50,739	40624
32.04.05.2003	Cimekar	4.78	38,378	40623
32.04.05.2001	Cileunyi Kulon	5.18	26,781	40621
32.04.05.2002	Cileunyi Wetan	7.85	34,255	40622
32.04.05.2006	Cibiru Wetan	4.86	20,139	40625
Totals		30.67	184,397	
