= Rawalo =

District in Central Java, Indonesia

Rawalo ꦫꦮꦭꦺꦴ
- District
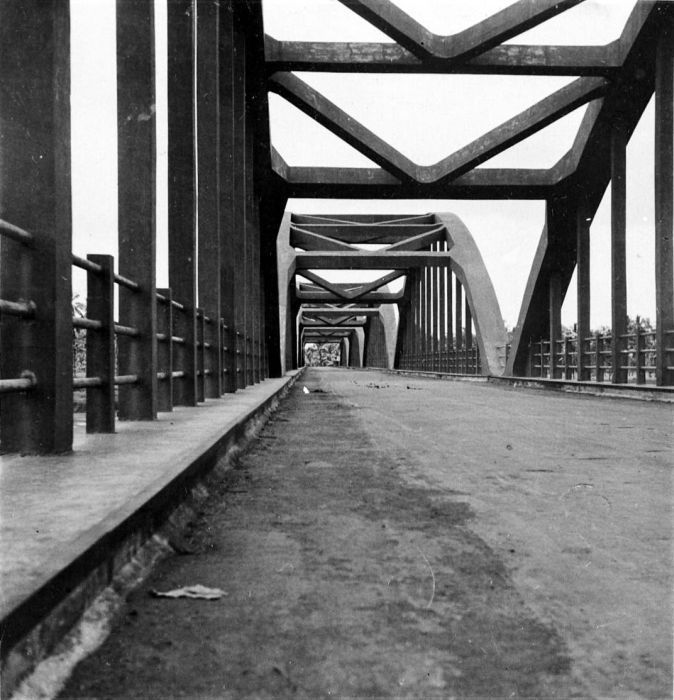
- Rawalo Bridge

- Location within Java Location within Indonesia
- Coordinates: 07°30′56″S 109°10′49″E
- Country: Indonesia
- Province: Central Java
- Regency: Banyumas

Area
  - Total: 51.48 km^{2} (19.88 sq mi)
- Elevation: 33 m (108 ft)

Population (mid 2023 estimate)
  - Total: 56,064
  - Density: 1,089/km^{2} (2,821/sq mi)
- Time zone: UTC+7 (WIB)
- Ministry of Home Affairs Code: 02.33.04

Rawalo (Javanese: ꦫꦮꦭꦺꦴ) is an administrative district in Banyumas Regency, Central Java Province of Indonesia. Rawalo is approximately 20 kilometres south of Purwokerto, the administrative center of Banyumas Regency. In mid 2023, the population of Rawalo was 56,064.

== Geography ==
Rawalo is located in the southern part of Banyumas Regency. It covers an area of 5,148 hectares, and has an average elevation of 33 metres above the sea level.

== Administrative divisions ==
In 2024, Rawalo is divided into the following nine villages (desa):

- Banjarparak
- Losari
- Menganti
- Pesawahan
- Rawalo
- Sanggreman
- Sidamulih
- Tambaknegara
- Tipar

== Education ==
There are a total of 43 schools across Rawalo, which are classified in the following table:

| Type | Number | |
| Type | Public | Private |
|---|---|---|
| Primary schools (SD) | 22 | 1 |
| Junior High Schools (SMP) | 2 | 3 |
| Madrasah Ibtidaiyah (MI) | 0 | 10 |
| Madrasah Tsanawiyah (MTs) | 0 | 5 |
