= Indramayu =

- District

Regional transcription(s)
  - Javanese: ꦆꦤ꧀ꦢꦿꦩꦪꦸ
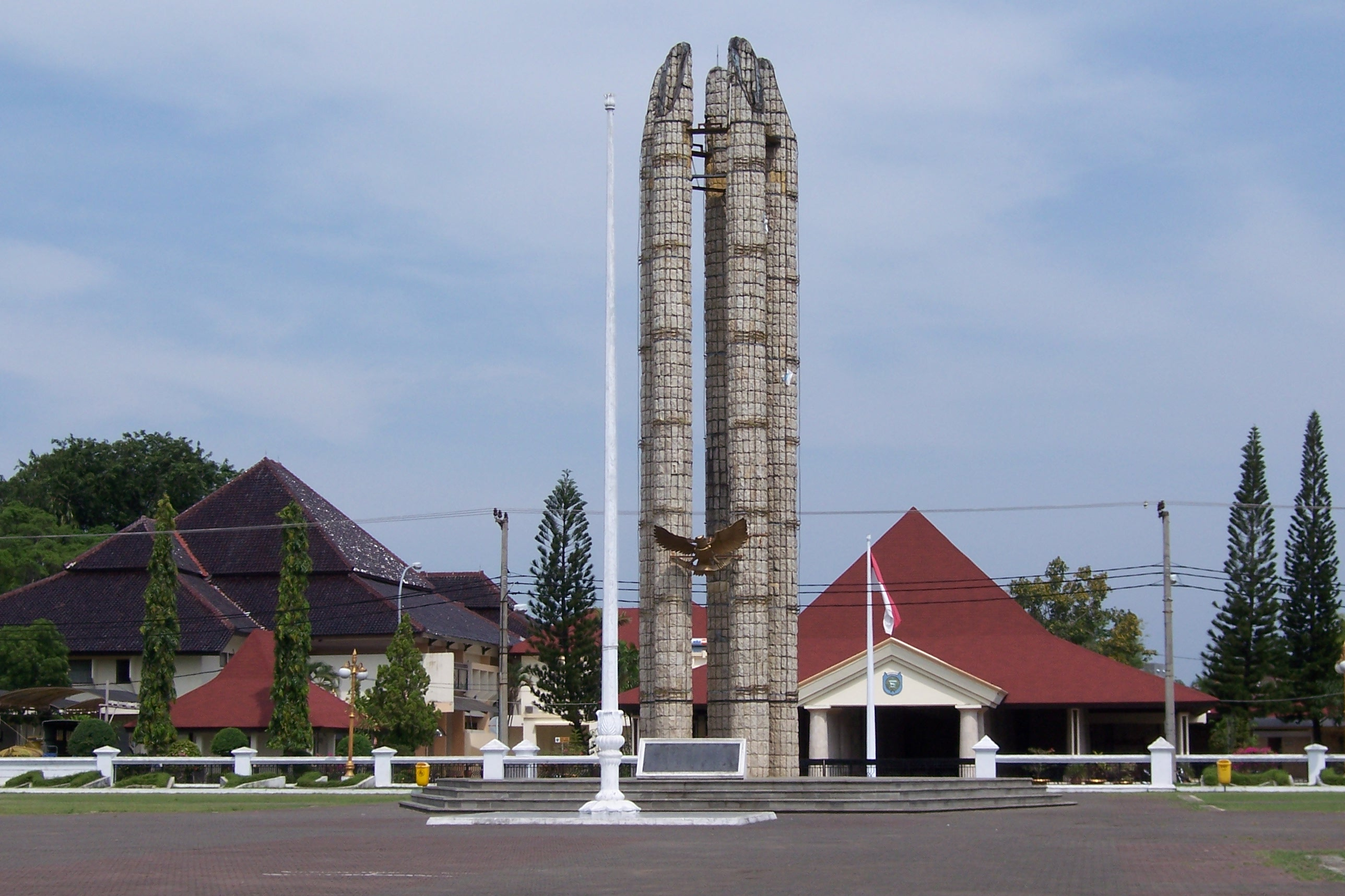
- Bamboo Monument of Indramayu
- Etymology: Sultant Wiralodra
- Location in Java and Indonesia Indramayu (Indonesia)
- Coordinates: 6°21′10″S 108°19′27″E
- Country: Indonesia
- Province: West Java
- Regency: Indramayu Regency

Government
  - Camat: Nandang Suparman
  - Secretary: Rostati Kasman

Area
  - Total: 53.58 km^{2} (20.69 sq mi)
- Elevation: 3 m (9.8 ft)

Population (mid 2024 estimate)
  - Total: 125,570
  - Density: 2,344/km^{2} (6,070/sq mi)
- Time zone: UTC+7 (IWT)
- Postal code: 4521x
- Area code: (+62) 234
- Villages: 18
- Website: Official website

Indramayu (Javanese: ꦆꦤ꧀ꦢꦿꦩꦪꦸ; Chinese: 南麻由), named after the God Indra, is a town and district which serves as the capital of Indramayu Regency in the West Java province of Indonesia, and is located in the northern coastal area of West Java, east from Jakarta, north-east from the city of Bandung, and north-west of the city of Cirebon. Most of its land are situated below sea level, which makes the district vulnerable to high tide in stormy conditions. The district is only protected by some dunes and barrages at the seaside.

== History ==
Dermayu is the old name for Indramayu, in the form of the Dermayu Sultanate that was founded by Sultan Khalif Aria Wirasamudra in 1478 after gaining independence from the Majapahit empire. Sultan Marangali became the last Dermayu Sultan in 1770, after that the area fully came under colonial rule of the Dutch East India Company (VOC).

== Administrative divisions ==
Indramayu District is divided into 18 villages of which eight are urban kelurahan (listed first in the table below) and the other ten are rural desa. The table also includes the areas and populations of the villages at the 2010 and 2020 Censuses, and the official estimates as of mid-2023, together with their post codes.

Kode Wilayah	Name of District (kecamatan)	Area in km^{2}	Pop'n 2010 census	Pop'n 2020 census	Pop'n mid 2023 estimate	Post code
32.12.15.1001	Bojongsari	0.99	5,053	5,600	5,931	45214
32.12.15.1002	Kepandean	1.10	3,190	3,354	3,511	45214
32.12.15.1003	Karangmalang	1.02	3,845	3,996	4,276	45213
32.12.15.1004	Karanganyar	0.91	3,994	4,273	4,649	45213
32.12.15.1005	Lemahmekar	0.93	8,999	8,951	9,128	45212
32.12.15.1006	Lemahabang	0.51	4,419	4,183	4,453	45212
32.12.15.1007	Margadadi	2.21	9,239	11,037	11,520	45211
32.12.15.1008	Paoman	2.05	8,230	8,246	8,671	45211
32.12.15.2009	Telukagung	2.69	5,001	5,533	5,993	45215
32.12.15.2010	Plumbon	5.14	5,236	5,867	6,266	45215
32.12.15.2011	Dukuh	1.26	3,527	3,938	4,216	45215
32.12.15.2012	Pekandangan Jaya	3.94	4,714	5,108	5,553	45211
32.12.15.2013	Singaraja	6.18	5,981	7,063	7,333	45218
32.12.15.2014	Singajaya	6.82	8,273	9,441	9,346	45218
32.12.15.2015	Pekandangan	3.67	7,767	9,256	8,805	45216
32.12.15.2016	Karangsong	2.43	5,546	6,234	6,839	45219
32.12.15.2017	Pabeanudik	5.46	11,728	13,914	14,586	45219
32.12.15.2020	Tambak	0.92	1,830	3,564	4,150	45219
32.12.15	Indramayu (town)	48.21	106,572	119,558	125,226	

== Climate ==
Indramayu has a tropical savanna climate of Aw sub-type with moderate to little rainfall from May to November and heavy rainfall from December to April.

Climate data for Indramayu
Month	Jan	Feb	Mar	Apr	May	Jun	Jul	Aug	Sep	Oct	Nov	Dec	Year
Mean daily maximum °C (°F)	30.8 (87.4)	30.7 (87.3)	31.2 (88.2)	31.9 (89.4)	32.4 (90.3)	32.5 (90.5)	32.9 (91.2)	33.5 (92.3)	34.2 (93.6)	34.1 (93.4)	33.0 (91.4)	31.8 (89.2)	32.4 (90.3)
Daily mean °C (°F)	26.6 (79.9)	26.6 (79.9)	26.8 (80.2)	27.3 (81.1)	27.6 (81.7)	27.3 (81.1)	27.5 (81.5)	27.7 (81.9)	28.1 (82.6)	28.1 (82.6)	27.8 (82.0)	27.1 (80.8)	27.4 (81.3)
Mean daily minimum °C (°F)	22.5 (72.5)	22.5 (72.5)	22.5 (72.5)	22.7 (72.9)	22.8 (73.0)	22.2 (72.0)	22.1 (71.8)	21.9 (71.4)	22.0 (71.6)	22.2 (72.0)	22.6 (72.7)	22.5 (72.5)	22.4 (72.3)
Average rainfall mm (inches)	334 (13.1)	285 (11.2)	184 (7.2)	150 (5.9)	129 (5.1)	97 (3.8)	63 (2.5)	28 (1.1)	29 (1.1)	64 (2.5)	124 (4.9)	209 (8.2)	1,696 (66.6)
Source: Climate-Data.org

== Demographics ==
The number of (registered) citizens of Indramayu Regency is about 1,914,000 in mid 2024, but in the town itself just 125,570 people reside as at mid 2024. The estimated land area of the town of Indramayu is 48.21 km^{2} (18.61 sq mi). The local population near the shore subside on fishing. Furthermore, kapok, cloves, citrus and other fruits are cultivated. Indramayu is famous for the special sweet mangosteens and is also known as one of mango producers in West Java. Indramayu was known as Indonesia's main rice supplier in the early 1980s to late 1990s.

=== Religion ===
98.8% of the inhabitants are adherents of Islam, with the others being Protestant or Catholic Christians, Hindus, Buddhists, and Confucians.

== Economy ==
Crude oil is found in the Indramayu area. Pertamina, the state's oil company, have operated a refinery just outside the town since 1994.

That aside, because of an overall lack of industry and jobs, there is migration to other parts of Indonesia. In 2015, the unemployment in the town is 11.85% compared to a national average of 6.3% in 2016. Agriculture, trades, and services are the largest employers which altogether employed 73% of the workforce. The majority of "agricultural" workers are either rice farmers or fishermen, which employs about 5,000 workers each.

== Greater Indramayu ==
The urban area of the town extends beyond the district boundaries, in particular in the adjoining districts of Balongan, Sindang and Pasekan. it was calculated that at the 1990 Census the urban area included a population of 220,368.
