= Sinking of KMP Tunu Pratama Jaya =

2025 maritime disaster in Indonesia

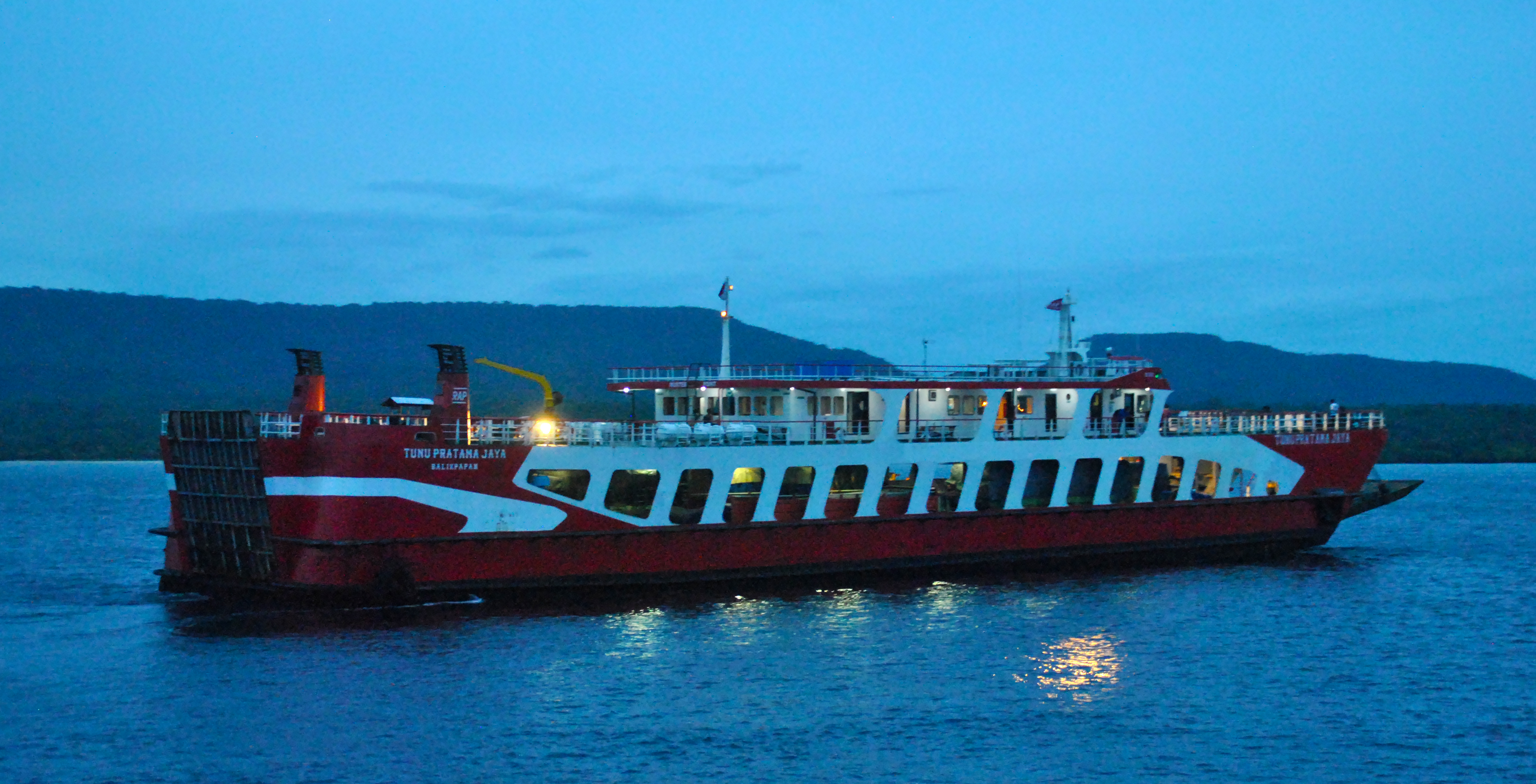
- KMP Tunu Pratama Jaya pictured in 2017

History

Indonesia
- Name: KMP Tunu Pratama Jaya
- Owner: PT Raputra Jaya
- Operator: Bunga Nusa Mahakam
- Port of registry: Kalimas Shipyard
- Route: Ketapang to Gilimanuk
- Builder: Karya Teknindo Jaya
- Launched: 2010
- Completed: 2010
- In service: 2010
- Out of service: 2 July 2025
- Fate: Capsized and sank on 2 July 2025

General characteristics
- Class & type: Roll-on/roll-off passenger ferry
- Tonnage: 871 GT
- Length: 63.3 m (207 ft 8 in)
- Crew: 12

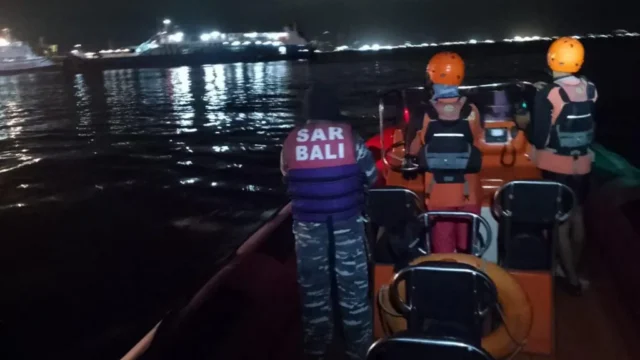
A search and rescue team deployed to the scene

On 2 July 2025, the roll-on/roll-off ferry KMP Tunu Pratama Jaya was roughly 30 minutes into a voyage between Banyuwangi port and Bali when it suffered water ingress in the engine room. The flooding could not be contained, causing the ship to suffer a total power outage a few minutes later. The ship rolled in rough seas until it lost stability allowing water to rush over the decks, causing it to capsize and sink before people could be evacuated. The vessel had at least 53 passengers and 12 crewmembers aboard at the time of the sinking. A total of 30 passengers had been rescued as of 4 July, but bad weather affected rescue operations. As of July 20, 19 people had been confirmed dead and 16 others have been reported missing.

== Chronology ==
KMP Tunu Pratama Jaya (call sign: YCSR, IMO: 8749432, MMSI: 525022386), a 2010-built passenger-vehicle Ro-Ro ship with a gross tonnage of approximately 734 tons, sailed regularly on the route Port of Ketapang, Banyuwangi – Port of Gilimanuk, Bali carrying up to 53 passengers, 12 crew, and 22 vehicles, including heavy trucks and pick-ups. On Wednesday night, July 2, 2025, at 22.56 WIB, the ship glided away from the Ketapang dock after the loading and unloading process was completed and the safety aspects were declared suitable, even though the sea conditions at that time were quite heavy with waves of 2–2.5 meters and strong winds.

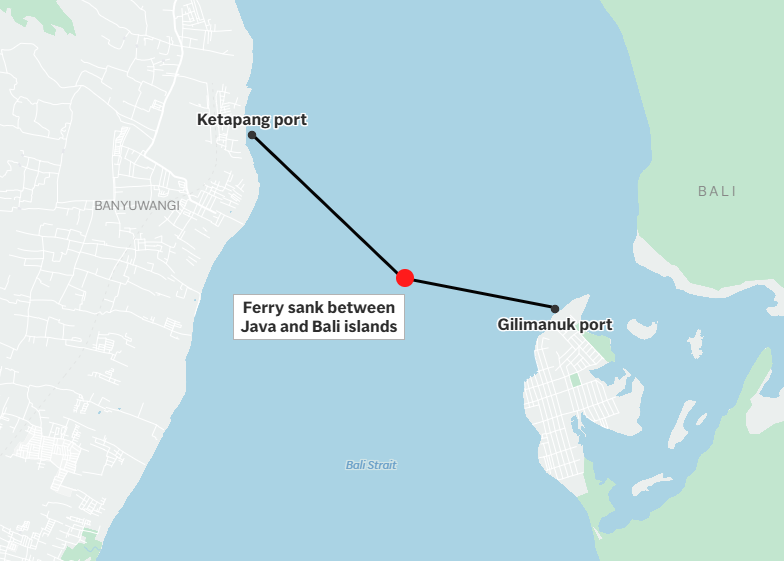
The location of where the ship sank

Around 11:15–11:20 PM local times, while the ship was in the middle of the Bali Strait, the officer on duty detected a technical problem in the form of a leak in the engine room and immediately sent a distress signal via radio channels 17–18. At this stage, the ship's main systems were still functioning, including the engine, navigation, and communications, and the ship had not shown any significant signs of listing. An electrical blackout, which also affected the engine and navigation systems, occurred a dozen minutes later (around 12:16–12:19 PM according to Basarnas sources), as a consequence of water entering the engine room.

Several minutes after the emergency signal was sent (around 11:15–11:20 PM), the ship began to show a significant list to starboard. The helmsman and the watchman witnessed water entering the engine room through the open engine room door, this was confirmed by the report of the oilman on duty who stated a similar condition. Immediately afterward, the officer on duty ordered the crew to help passengers put on life jackets and prepare for evacuation, while the captain, who was resting, was awakened and immediately took over the helm. Within a short time, several vehicles at the stern of the ship shifted to starboard, worsening the ship's tilt until it entered a critical phase.

This phase escalated rapidly until the ship was on the verge of losing control. KNKT reported that shortly after the initial tilt, the ship experienced a total blackout, losing power and navigation systems at around 00.19 AM. In pitch darkness, Nearby vessels attempted to assist with searchlights, but the nighttime conditions and high waves made it difficult to identify floating objects in the sea.

After a total blackout at around 00.19 AM, the ship quickly lost power and balance, then began to list drastically to starboard. Based on the KNKT report, within minutes after the distress signal, the stern passed the right side and began to sink first, worsening the tilt due to the vehicle shifting to one side and water increasingly rushing into the engine room and passenger deck. Testimonies from passengers, such as Bejo Santoso, described that the ship had "rolled three times" before finally capsizing and sinking in just three minutes until the entire structure of the ship was below sea level.

Passengers remaining on the main deck and passenger deck panicked as they watched the ship tilt and capsize. Some jumped overboard, while others were pushed by the water entering the passenger compartment. As the ship sank completely, ship materials and vehicles began to collapse into the sea, complicating evacuation efforts. Bad weather that night hampered the self-evacuation process; Eyewitnesses reported that only a few passengers managed to float with life jackets that were scattered, until finally fishermen and the SAR team arrived at the location.

== Victims ==
KMP Tunu Pratama Jaya sank in the Bali Strait with a total of 65 people on board (53 passengers and 12 crew). Since then, joint SAR operations have continued, and as of July 20, 30 people have been rescued, 19 have been found dead, and 16 victims are still missing. With an average of two bodies found every day, the total number of victims evacuated reached 47 people, including 30 survivors and 19 deaths. Basarnas extended the search operation for three additional days from July 12 to 14, adding to the total operation duration of 13 days.

== Investigation ==
Based on the findings of the National Transportation Safety Committee (KNKT), the ship experienced a leak in the engine room after seawater entered through the engine room door, causing a blackout and water inrush on the rear vehicle deck. Additionally, high waves that had struck the ship were also examined. However, the KNKT emphasized that the ship's design should be able to withstand waves as high as 2–3 meters, so further analysis is needed to determine whether the ship's structure is no longer seaworthy or has suffered hidden damage.

In addition to technical factors, human and procedural errors are also a major focus of the investigation. The first phase of the investigation includes collecting crew and passenger statements and verifying the eligibility of documents such as the Sailing Approval Letter (SPB) and the last docking record in October 2024. There are indications of potential overloading or non-manifest loading, including the possibility of vehicles not being properly tied, which contributed to changes in the ship's balance when the tilt occurred.

The Water Police Directorate of the East Java Regional Police has questioned several crew members, particularly crew witnesses and three surviving passengers, with the agenda of further investigation, including the status of the main captain and captain at the time of the accident. Furthermore, the DPR RI, through Commission V, is urging the Ministry of Transportation and the National Transportation Safety Committee (KNKT) to impose strict sanctions on the operator and negligent parties, as well as to review the shipping permits of similar vessels. If the investigation reveals violations such as overloading or inadequate shipworthiness documents, legal proceedings will certainly be carried out in accordance with the Shipping Law and regulations related to maritime safety.

The KNKT has designed a three-phase investigation to uncover the cause of the sinking of the KMP Tunu Pratama Jaya. The first phase has been completed with the collection of statements from surviving passengers, crew, as well as the shipping company and the Ketapang Port operator, including video analysis of vehicle loading before the ship departed. In the second phase, the KNKT will examine technical aspects such as the ship's maintenance history, including the results of the last docking in October 2024 from the Indonesian Classification Bureau and evaluate the ship's design, especially its ability to withstand waves as high as 2–3 meters.

== Response ==
National political authorities immediately responded to the incident, calling for a fundamental review of maritime transportation regulations and oversight. The Speaker of the Indonesian House of Representatives, Puan Maharani, expressed her condolences for the victims and called for improvements in shipping safety management on all domestic routes, so that similar incidents do not recur. In line with this, a member of Commission V of the House of Representatives, Syaiful Huda (PKB), pushed for a thorough investigation to uncover procedural weaknesses such as SPB verification and emergency rescue systems on board ships, which are considered to be far from the required safety standards. ideal. Commission V then summoned the Minister of Transportation in a working meeting to request an official explanation regarding the cause of the ship's sinking, including highlighting the ship's distance which was only a few miles from the port but immediately experienced a disaster.

President Prabowo Subianto, who was performing the Umrah pilgrimage in Saudi Arabia, immediately took action by instructing Basarnas and related agencies to carry out an emergency rescue response for the victims. This instruction was confirmed by Cabinet Secretary, Teddy Indra Wijaya, who stated that the President "immediately ordered … to immediately carry out an emergency response to rescue the passengers and crew." Ministry of Transportation opened an integrated post at Gilimanuk Port to speed up search coordination, with comprehensive support from the TNI AL, Polri, ASDP, and local SAR units.
