= Indonesian National Route 11 =

Road in Indonesia

Nasional 11

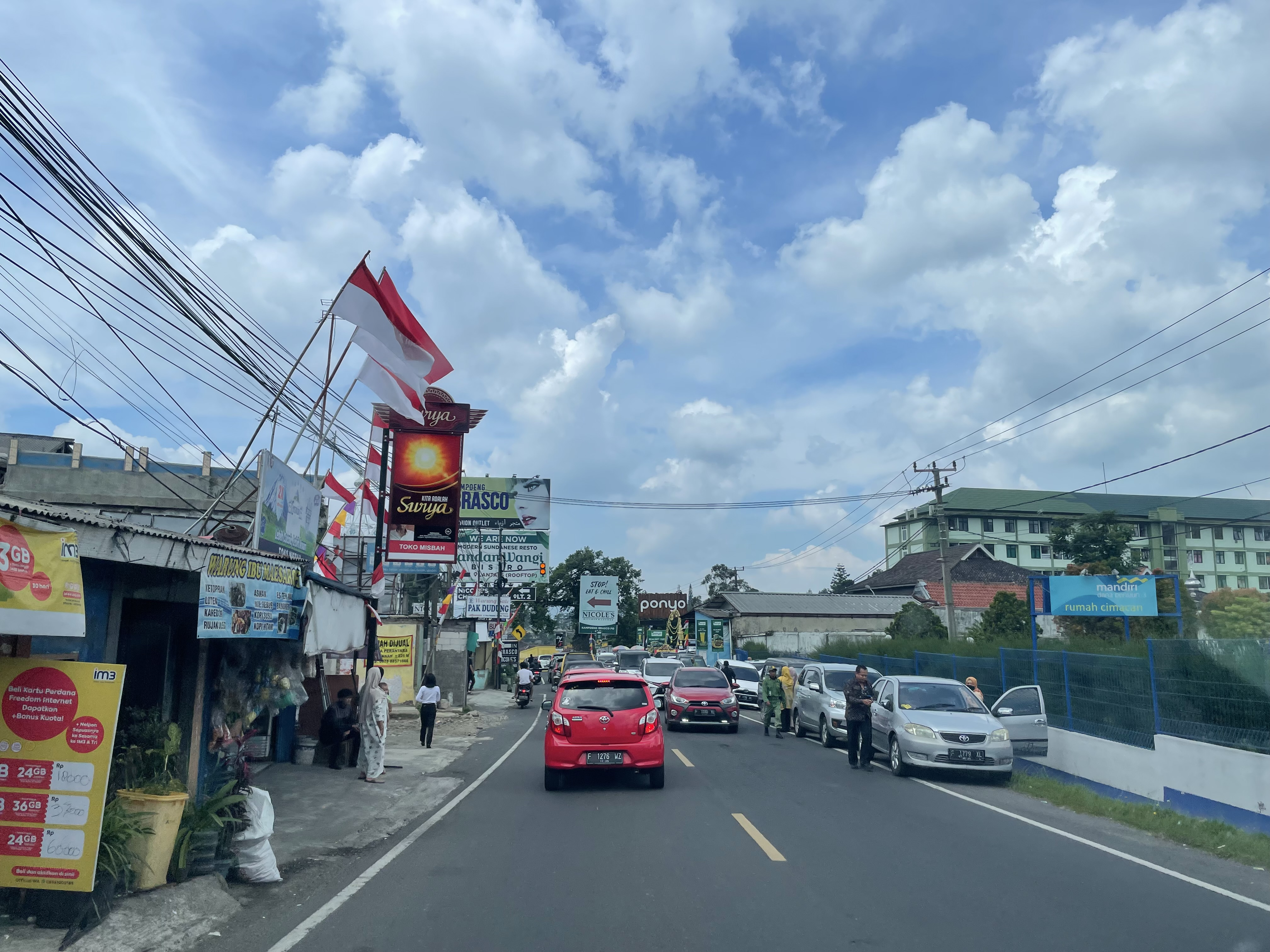

Route information
- Length: 235 km (146 mi)

Major junctions
- West end: Cibadak
- National 1 National 2 National 3 National 5 National 7
- East end: Palimanan

Location
- Country: Indonesia

Highway system
- Transport in Indonesia
← National 10	→ National 12

Indonesian National Route 11 is a road in the national route system that is located in the Banten and West Java province, and connects Labuhan, Pandeglang Regency, Banten on the western end, and Cianjur, Cianjur Regency, West Java in the eastern end.

== Route ==
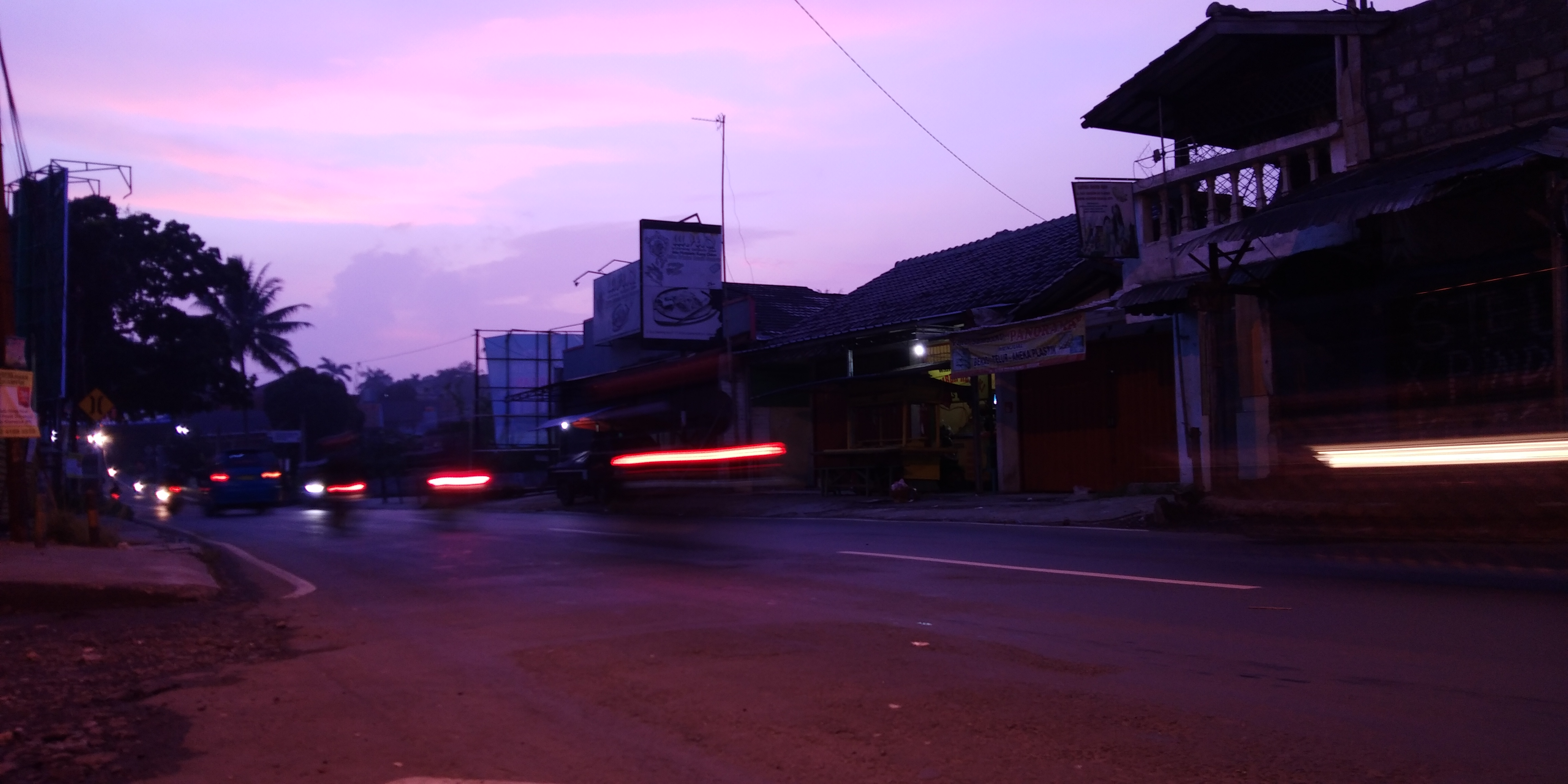
Cibadak-Ciampea Rd., part of the route.

=== Banten ===
Labuan - Menes - Saketi - Pandeglang - Rangkasbitung - Cigelung

=== West Java ===
Jasinga - Leuwiliang - Cigudeg - Ciampea - Dramaga - Bogor - Ciawi - Gadog - Cipayung - Cisarua - Puncak - Ciloto - Cipanas - Pacet - Cugenang - Cianjur
