= Indonesian National Route 12 =

Road in Indonesia

Nasional 12

Major junctions
- North end: Tanah Abang
- National 2 National 11
- South end: Bogor

Location
- Country: Indonesia

Highway system
- Transport in Indonesia
← National 11	→ National 13

Indonesian National Route 12 is a relatively short, yet heavily used road in the national route system. It serves as one of the major arteries in the Jabodetabek region (also known as Greater Jakarta), as the road spans through areas considered as part of the metropolitan area itself. Despite its location, it spans through three provinces, that is Jakarta, Banten, and West Java, as the road itself connects Senayan, South Jakarta, Jakarta on the northern end, with Bogor, Bogor Regency, West Java in its southern end.

Because of its heavy use and presence in Greater Jakarta, this route is notorious for having heavy traffic, particularly during the rush hour. This route is also known as the only national route left to have access towards Jakarta, as another national route (the Indonesian National Route 2) has already been transformed into a toll road.

== Route ==
=== Jakarta ===
Senayan - Kebayoran Lama - Pondok Indah - Lebak Bulus

=== Banten ===
Ciputat - Pamulang - Pondok Cabe

=== West Java ===
Bojong Sari - Sawangan - Parung - Kemang - Semplak - Tanah Sareal - Bogor
