= Indonesian National Route 2 =

Road in Indonesia

Nasional 2

Major junctions
- North end: Jakarta
- National 1 National 3 National 11; National 12; National 13
- South end: Cibadak

Location
- Country: Indonesia

Highway system
- Transport in Indonesia
← National 1	→ National 3

Indonesian National Route 2 connects Jakarta and Cibadak, Sukabumi. It runs from north to south. It passes two provinces, namely Jakarta and West Java.

At Cibadak, the route continues to Indonesian National Route 3 which is run on the south of Java.

== Routes ==
Jakarta - Bogor - Ciawi - Benda - Cicurug - Parung Kuda - Cibadak

=== Description ===
==== Jakarta ====
From a junction with the Route 1 and old Great Post Road in Grogol, West Jakarta, Route 2 runs concurrently with Jl. S. Parman southeastward, parallel with Grogol River until reaching Tomang Interchange some 1.5 km later. In this segment, the route passes many buildings and structures such as Ciputra Mall, Trisakti University, Tarumanagara University, Podomoro City, etc.

Continuing 2.8 km southward, it interchanges with Route 12 leading for Bogor via Parung near MPR/DPR/DPD Complex, the highest legislative institution in Indonesia. The interchange also marks the complete entrance of the route into Central Jakarta, before entering South Jakarta two kilometers southeastward in Semanggi Interchange. Western railway line parallel with Route 12 passes underneath the route. Route 2 also passes near Gelora Bung Karno Stadium in this segment.

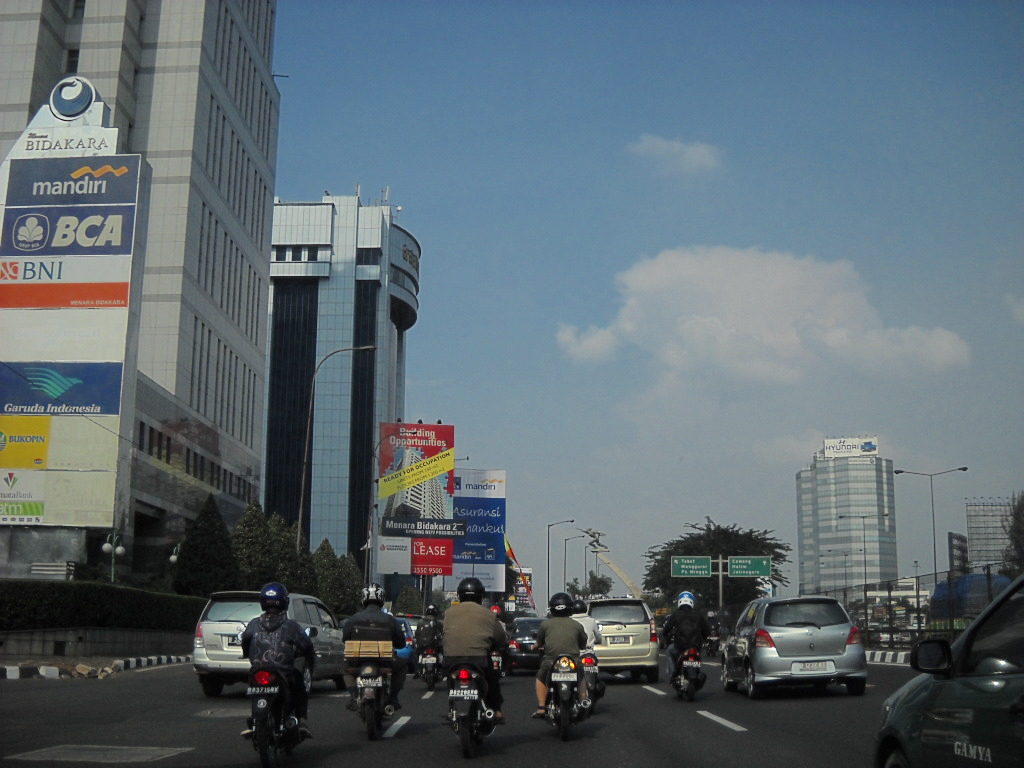
Route 1 carried by Jl. Gatot Subroto.

After leaving Semanggi Interchange, the route proceeds southeastward for approximately 4.5 km. In this segment, Route 2 is carried by Jl. Gatot Subroto, and has one interchange with Jl. HR. Rasuna Said. The route is then carried by Jl. MT. Haryono after passing Pancoran Flyover, where a statue is located nearby. Southern railway line underpasses the route some 1.5 km eastward. In this segment, Route 2 passes many important central business districts.

After crossing over Ciliwung River located 400 m east, Route 2 enters East Jakarta. In Cawang Interchange, located 1.5 km east, Route 2 turns to the south, entering Jl. MayJend. Sutoyo near Universitas Kristen Indonesia. Cawang Interchange also becomes the terminal point of Route 13, JaGorAwi, and Jakarta–Cikampek Toll Roads. Most traffic between Jakarta and Bogor takes the toll road due to congestion often occurred in Route 2. From this interchange southward, Route 2 runs concurrently with Great Post Road built by Herman Willem Daendels and parallel with a waterwork. In Cililitan Junction, located two kilometers southward, the route proceeds to the south as Jl. Raya Bogor, passing through the subdistricts of Kramat Jati, Ciracas, and Pasar Rebo. Route 2 interchanges with Jakarta Outer Ring Road (Cinere-JaGorAwi segment) five kilometers southward. Upon leaving the interchange, Route 2 travels six kilometers before reaching West Java border located near Infantry Battalion 201.

==== West Java ====
In Depok City, the entire route initially runs in subdistrict of Cimanggis. Near Bayer Factory, located 2.3 km south of Jakarta–West Java border, the two sides of Route 2 are split up between Cimanggis in the eastern side and Sukmajaya in western side. That persists until reaching Cilodong Junction located 7.7 km southward, when the western side comes in Cibinong, seat of Bogor Regency, while the eastern side still belongs to Depok. Route 2 entirely enters Bogor Regency some two kilometers southward. Continuing 3.7 km south, it curves to the southwest after leaving Nanggewer Mekar village, and enters Bogor City after crossing over Ciluar River.

Route 2 intersects with Bogor Outer Ring Road Toll located 2.5 km southwest of Bogor northern limit, after which its alignment is turns to north-south direction. After the intersection, Route 2 is carried by Jl. KS. Tubun for 580 m, then by Jl. Raya Pajajaran after Warung Jambu Junction. It then reaches the downtown some 3.5 kilometers southward. It is where Bogor's most prominent landmark, Bogor Botanical Gardens is located. Bogor Agricultural University (Baranangsiang campus) and Botani Square Mall are also located nearby. Not far from the landmarks, Route 2 intersects with Bogor Toll Plaza, located across Baranangsiang Bus Station, the largest bus station in Bogor. In Sukasari, located two kilometers southeastward, Route 12, running concurrently with Route 11 coming from Rangkasbitung, converges with Route 2. The junction marks the southern terminus of Route 12, but Route 11 doesn't, it runs concurrently with Route 2 instead. Route 2 is then carried by Jl. Raya Tajur for five kilometers.

After Ciawi Junction, Route 2 turns to the south. The junction also serves as the southernmost terminus of JaGorAwi Toll Road and the divergent point of Route 2 and Route 11; the latter proceeds eastward to Cianjur via Puncak, following the path of Great Post Road. A three-way junction in Warungnangka hamlet marks the complete entrance of the route into Bogor Regency; the route is previously divided between Bogor Regency in eastern side and Bogor City in western side. After encountering a junction in Tapos, located 700 m southward, Route 2 curves to the southwest, passing through mountainous area as it stretches on the slopes of Mount Salak, Mount Gede, and Mount Pangrango. Route 2 turns southward in Caringin, located 3.3 km later. Route 2 curves to the southwest three kilometers later in Cisempur hamlet. It later overpasses Southern railway line in Cigombong 2.2 km later, near a three-way junction. Before that it passes near Lake Lido.

Within one kilometer southward, Route 2 enters Sukabumi Regency. One kilometer later, the route curves to the west for one kilometer. It then proceeds south for 800 m, followed by a southwestward curving. It encounters a railway crossing in Cicurug some 2.8 km later. Continuing 9.5 km south via curvaceous path, it overpasses the railway line in Parung Kuda. Until reaching Downtown Cibadak, the railway still largely runs parallel with the route. After overcrossing Cicatih River some 9.5 km southeastwards, Route 2 merges with Route 3 coming from Pelabuhan Ratu, seat of Sukabumi Regency. Route 3 succeeds Route 2 in going into Sukabumi City.
