= Indonesian National Route 13 =

Road in Indonesia

Nasional 13

Route information
- Length: 9.1 km (5.7 mi)

Major junctions
- North end: Cempaka Putih
- National 1 National 2
- South end: Cawang

Location
- Country: Indonesia

Highway system
- Transport in Indonesia
← National 12	→ National 14

Indonesian National Route 13 is a road in Indonesia's national route system, with its course being entirely within the borders of the DKI Jakarta province. Its 15 kilometre path goes alongside Java's arterial highway route, the Indonesian National Route 1, and is also indirectly connected to another route, the Indonesian National Route 2. Like the nearby Indonesian National Route 2 (the route mentioned previously), the road has been completely transformed into a toll road; that being the Prof. Ir. Wiyoto Wiyono toll road.

== Route ==
- Jakarta:Cempaka Putih - Jatinegara - Cawang
