= Dramaga =

- Town and District
- Location in Bogor Regency, Java and Indonesia Dramaga (Java) Dramaga (Indonesia)
- Coordinates: 6°37′37″S 106°43′25″E
- Country: Indonesia
- Province: West Java
- Regency: Bogor Regency
- Established: 11 January 1992 (Regional expansion from Ciomas)

Area
  - Total: 24.23 km^{2} (9.36 sq mi)
- Elevation: 192 m (630 ft)

Population (mid 2024 estimate)
  - Total: 117,338
  - Density: 4,843/km^{2} (12,540/sq mi)
- Time zone: UTC+7 (IWST)
- Area code: (+62) 251
- Vehicle registration: F
- Villages: 10
- Website: kecamatandramaga.bogorkab.go.id

Dramaga is a town and an administrative district (Indonesian: kecamatan) in the Bogor Regency of West Java Province, Indonesia and thus part of Jakarta's metropolitan area.

Dramaga was previously part of Ciomas district before it was split off from the western part of the district in 1992.

Dramaga District covers an area of 24.23 km^{2}, and had a population of 100,679 at the 2010 Census and 110,374 at the 2020 Census; the official estimate as at mid 2024 was 117,338 (comprising 60,324 males and 57,014 females). The administrative centre is at the town of Dramaga, and the district is sub-divided into ten villages (desa), all sharing the postcode of 16680, as listed below with their areas and populations as at mid 2024.

Kode Wilayah	Name of desa	Area in km^{2}	Population mid 2024 estimate
32.01.30.2006	Purwasari	2.11	8,075
32.01.30.2005	Petir	4.48	16,361
32.01.30.2001	Sukadamai	2.65	10,201
32.01.30.2004	Sukawening	2.46	9,612
32.01.30.2010	Neglasari	1.72	11,291
32.01.30.2003	Sinarsari	1.72	10,914
32.01.30.2002	Ciherang	2.52	18,176
32.01.30.2009	Dramaga (town)	1.21	14,511
32.01.30.2008	Babakan	3.34	7,819
32.01.30.2007	Cikarawang	2.26	10,378
32.01.30	Totals	24.23	117,338
