= Port of Gilimanuk =

Seaport in Indonesia

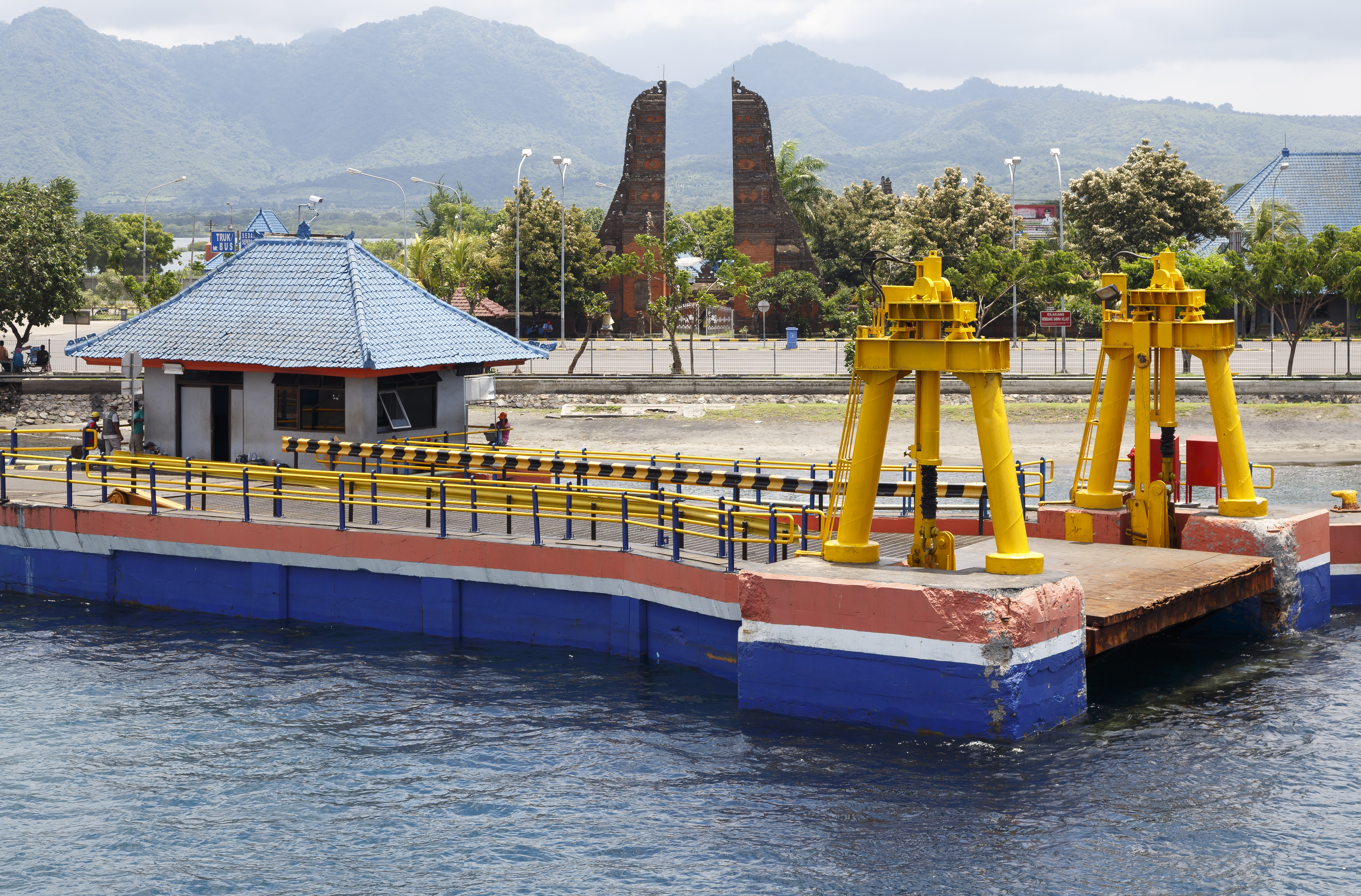
- View of the port
- Interactive map of Port of Gilimanuk
- Location in Indonesia
- Native name: Pelabuhan Gilimanuk

Location
- Country: Indonesia
- Location: Jembrana Regency, Bali
- Coordinates: 8.1597°S 114.4356°E
- UN/LOCODE: ID GIL

Details
- Owned by: ASDP Indonesia Ferry
- Type of harbour: Natural seaport
- No. of wharfs: Pontoon, Hydraulics & Landing craft
- No. of piers: 4

Statistics
- Vessel arrivals: Daily
- Website www.asdp.id/pelabuhan/pelabuhan-gilimanuk

Port of Gilimanuk is a ferry seaport located in Gilimanuk, Melaya, Jembrana Regency, Bali, Indonesia that connects the island of Bali with Java across the Bali Strait via sea transport. The port is operated by ASDP Indonesia Ferry, a state-owned port authority company. Travellers who are planning to visit Java from Bali via land route may ferry from this port and harbor at Port of Ketapang in Banyuwangi, East Java. Every day, hundreds of ferry sailings carry passengers and vehicles between Gilimanuk and Ketapang, with an average crossing duration of about 1 hour depending on sea conditions.

== History ==
In the early 20th century, the Gilimanuk area was still described as dense forest inhabited by wildlife such as starlings and doves, and very few people dared to settle there because it was remote and considered dangerous. Javanese visitors reportedly called the area “Tanjung Selat” (Cape of the Strait), while locals in Bali referred to it as “Ujung” (the tip).

By the 1930s, during Dutch colonial rule, Gilimanuk began changing from wilderness into a guarded settlement when the colonial government moved high‑risk prisoners from Candikusuma to Gilimanuk and built detention facilities there. An official named Raden Mas Jasiman was tasked with supervising the prisoners.

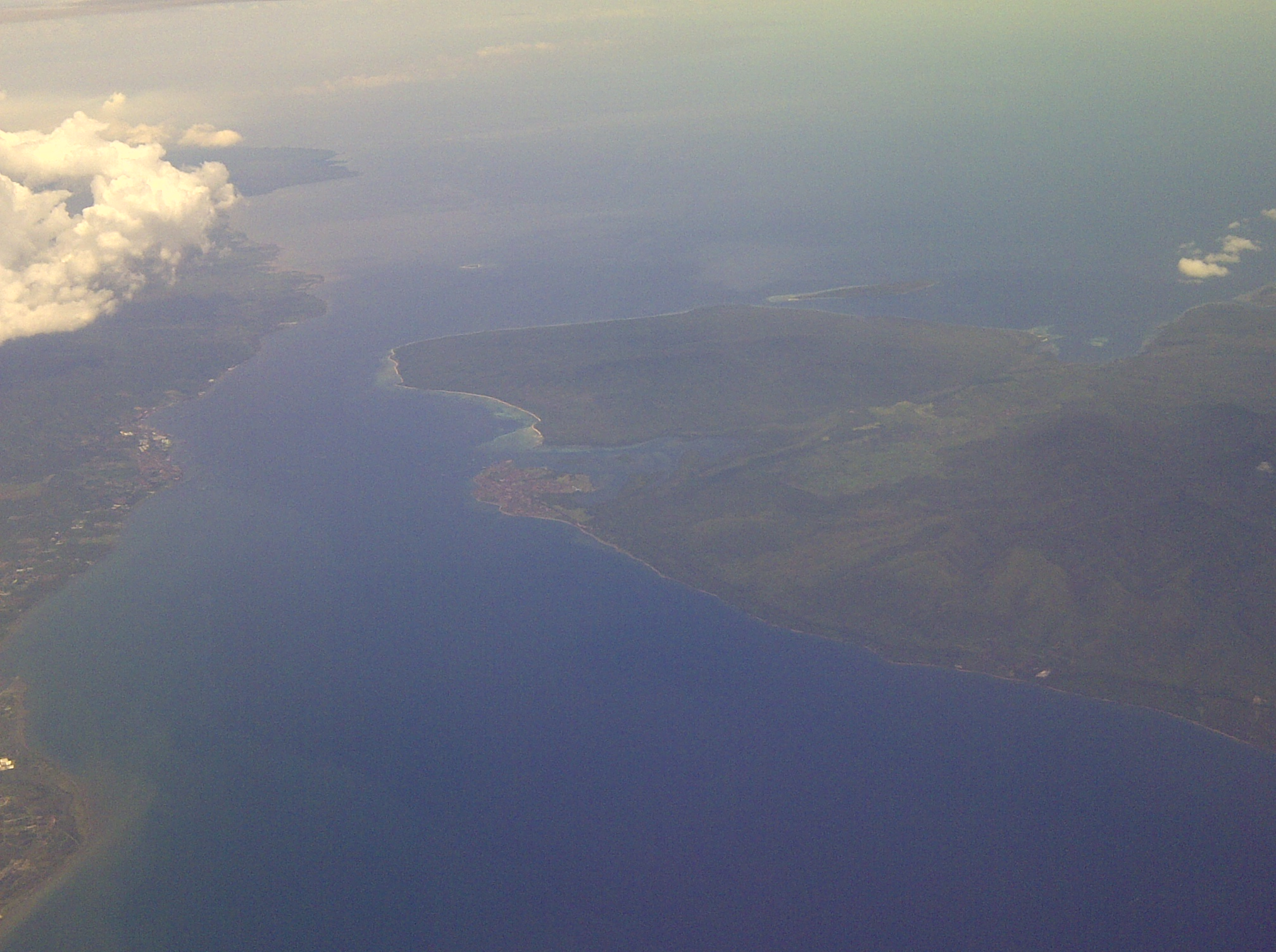
Aerial view of the Bali Strait, the crossing between Port of Ketapang and Port of Gilimanuk.

Before a formal ferry port existed, crossings over the Bali Strait used traditional boats, and traders often had to wait three to five days to cross because transport capacity was very limited. In the 1950s, three privately owned vessels from Banyuwangi named Bjitoe, Soponyono, and Coser began operating on the Gilimanuk–Banyuwangi route, increasing capacity and frequency of crossings. In 1963, Gilimanuk officially began operating as a ferry port serving a regular crossing line with ferries that could carry passengers, vehicles, and goods on fixed schedules. Initially, ferries reportedly departed about once every three hours, but as the number of vessels and demand grew, departures increased to roughly every 30 minutes and eventually to 24‑hour operations.

Regulatory reforms in the 2000s changed its institutional status several times: in 2002 it became the Gilimanuk Harbour Office (Kanpel) under Ministerial Regulation KM 63/2002, then was reclassified as a Class III Harbour Administration Unit Office (Kantor UPP Kelas III Gilimanuk) under KM 62/2010, and later upgraded to Class II status under Ministerial Regulation PM 77/2018.

== Facilities ==
Gilimanuk functions as a RoRo ferry port with dedicated ramps and piers that allow vehicles to drive directly on and off the ferries. The port layout includes a basin and berthing structures suitable for short‑distance ferry crossings across the Bali Strait.

Gilimanuk Port provides basic terminal amenities such as waiting areas, ticketing counters, toilets, and food or snack stalls to serve people transiting between Bali and Java. During holiday readiness inspections, authorities specifically review the cleanliness of toilets, the flow of arrivals and departures, monitoring rooms, customer service points, and special rooms such as breastfeeding rooms.
