= Bali Mandara Toll Road =

Toll Road in Indonesia

Coordinates: 8.766487°S 115.197233°E

Nusa Dua-Ngurah Rai-Benoa Toll Road
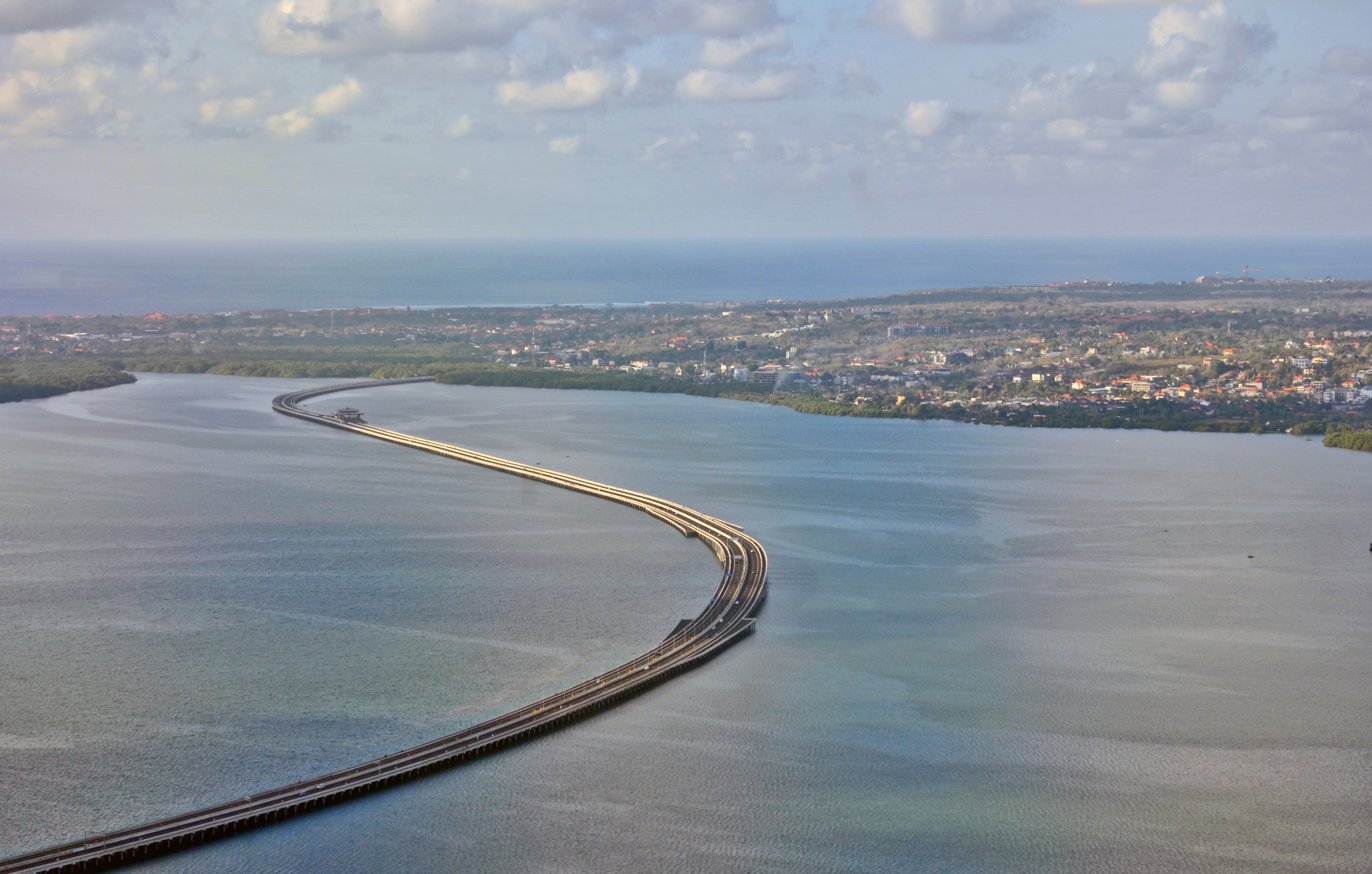
- Bali Mandara Toll Road in 2014

Route information
- Part of AH2
- Maintained by PT Jasamarga Bali Tol (JBT)
- Length: 8.3 km (5.2 mi)
- Existed: 2013–present

Major junctions
- South end: Nusa Dua
- North end: Ngurah Rai International Airport; Denpasar

Location
- Country: Indonesia
- Provinces: Bali
- Major cities: Badung Regency; Denpasar

Highway system
- Transport in Indonesia

Bali Mandara Toll Road or Nusa Dua-Ngurah Rai-Benoa Toll Road is a controlled-access toll road carried by a bridge stretching across the Gulf of Benoa. The 8.3-kilometre (5.2 mi) highway connects the city of Denpasar and South Kuta, Badung Regency, Nusa Dua and Ngurah Rai International Airport. It cost Rp 2.48 Trillion (US$220 million) to construct and was intended to prevent traffic jams on the Ngurah Rai Bypass Road, previously the only road connecting areas of Bali on opposite sites of the airport. The Ngurah Rai Bypass Road, a land-based route, could not be widened because of the location of the airport runway; the new toll road was instead constructed over water.

== History ==
Bali Mandara Toll Road began construction in March 2012 and was completed in October 2013. The road was officially opened on 23 September 2013 by President Susilo Bambang Yudhoyono. At the 2013 APEC Summit in Bali, the toll road was passed by several state leaders. The toll road undergone a beautification and other adjustments in preparation for the 2022 G20 Bali Summit.

The toll road is managed by PT Jasamarga Bali Tol, a subsidiary of state-run PT Jasamarga, with support from Indonesia Port Corporation III, the governments of Bali Province and Badung Regency, Angkasa Pura I, Adhi Karya, Hutama Karya, Indonesia Tourism Development Corporation, and Wijaya Karya.

== Names ==
The name Bali Mandara was given by President Susilo Bambang Yudhoyono at the inauguration of the toll road on September 23, 2013. Mandara itself means Maju, Aman, Damai, dan Sejahtera (progressive, safe, peaceful and prosperous); however, the name considered more political because it is identical to the slogan coined by Governor of Bali at the time, I Made Mangku Pastika during his tenure.

In 2018, there was a plan to change the name into I Gusti Ngurah Rai Bridge, to honor local hero I Gusti Ngurah Rai and since the toll road is situated within I Gusti Ngurah Rai International Airport vicinity.

== Exits ==
Province	Location	km	mi	Exit	Name	Destinations	Notes
Bali	Badung Regency	0.0	0.0	0	Nusa Dua Ramp	Nusa Dua; Jimbaran	Southern terminus
Bali	Badung Regency	1.45	0.90		Nusa Dua Toll Gate	Ngurah Rai International Airport; Denpasar	Northbound only
Bali	Badung Regency	5.6	3.5	5	Ngurah Rai Toll Gate	Ngurah Rai International Airport; Kuta	
Bali	Badung Regency	7.5	4.7		Benoa Toll Gate	Ngurah Rai International Airport; Nusa Dua	Southbound only
Bali	Denpasar	8.0	5.0	8	Benoa Ramp	Northbound; Denpasar; Sanur; Southbound; Port of Benoa	Northern terminus
1.000 mi = 1.609 km; 1.000 km = 0.621 mi: Electronic toll collection

== Gallery ==
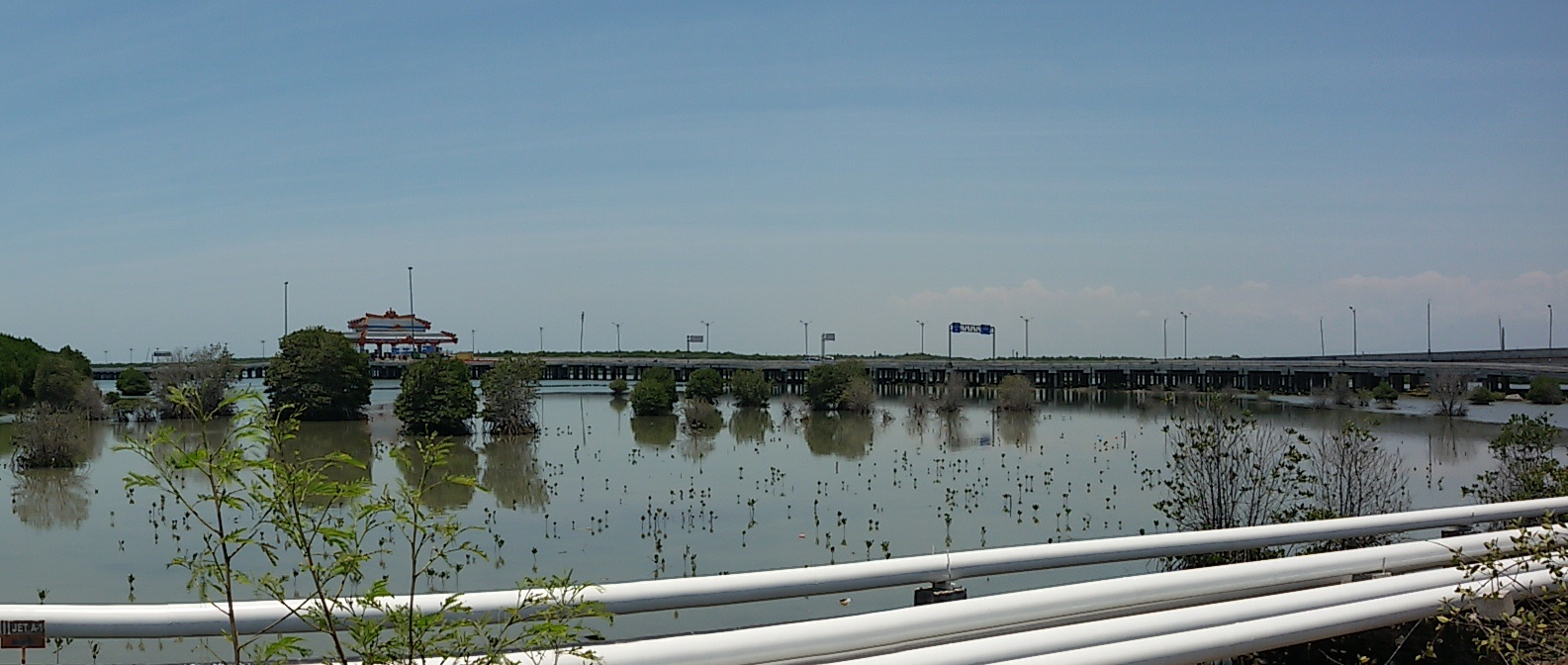
Bali Mandara Toll Road as of 2015

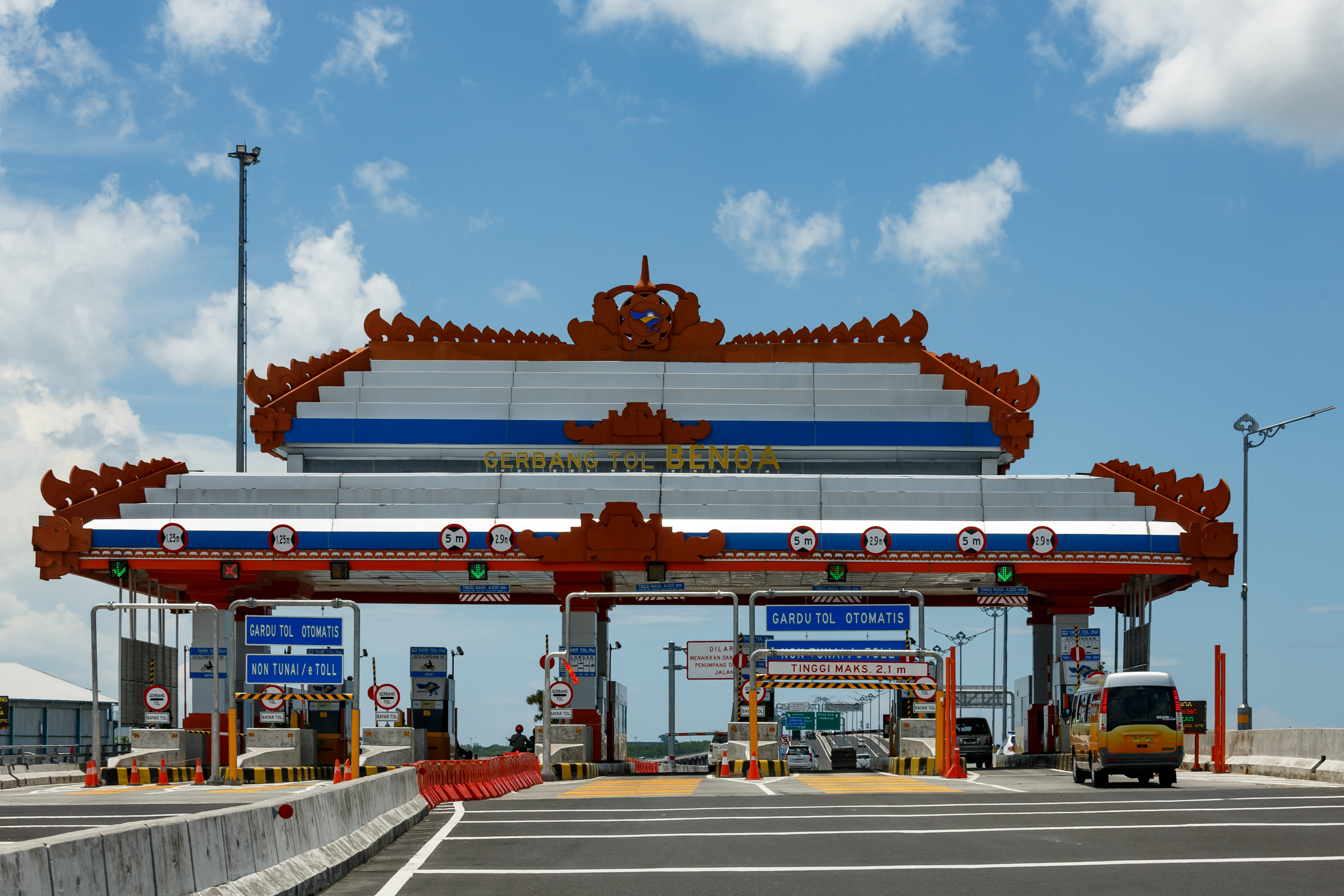
Benoa toll plaza
