= Ciomas =

District in West Java, Indonesia

- Town and District
- Location within Java Location within Indonesia
- Coordinates: 06°36′09″S 106°45′55″E
- Country: Indonesia
- Provinces: West Java
- Regency: Bogor
- Villages: 11

Government
  - Camat: Drs. Chairuka Judhyanto, M.Si

Area
  - Total: 16.07 km^{2} (6.20 sq mi)
- Elevation: 222 m (728 ft)

Population (mid 2024 estimate)
  - Total: 166,220
  - Density: 10,340/km^{2} (26,790/sq mi)
- Time zone: UTC+7 (WIB)
- Postal code: 16610
- Ministry of Home Affairs Code: 32.01.29

Ciomas is a town and an administrative district (kecamatan) in Bogor Regency, West Java, Indonesia. It is located east of the provincial border with Banten Province, about 21 kilometres southwest of the regency capital Cibinong, and 3 kilometres west of the city center of Bogor, of which it is effectively an integral part even though outside the official city boundary. Ciomas District borders districts of Bogor City (Bogor Barat to the north and Bogor Selatan to the east) and other districts of Bogor Regency (Tamansari to the south and Dramaga to the west). It covers an area of 16.07 km^{2}, and had a population of 149,167 at the 2010 Census and 170,486 at the 2020 Census; the official estimate as at mid 2024 was 166,220 (comprising 84,190 males and 82,030 females).

The administrative centre is at Pagelaran, and the district is sub-divided into the urban community (kelurahan) of Padasuka and ten villages (desa), all sharing the postcode of 16610. Their areas and the estimated populations as at mid 2024, are set out below:

Kode Wilayah	Name of Desa	Area in km^{2}	Population mid 2024 estimate
32.01.29.2009	Kota Baru	2.74	25,184
32.01.29.2001	Mekarjaya	0.86	9,996
32.01.29.2004	Parakan	1.36	11,801
32.01.29.2005	Ciomas (town)	1.07	14,677
32.01.29.2006	Pagelaran	2.03	22,163
32.01.29.2007	Sukamakmur	1.82	13,513
32.01.29.2008	Ciapus	1.16	15,127
32.01.29.2002	Sukaharja	1.73	8,217
32.01.29.1003	Padasuka	1.13	18,641
32.01.29.2011	Ciomas Rahayu	0.88	13,279
32.01.29.2010	Laladon	1.29	13,622
32.01.29	Totals	16.32	166,220

== Geography ==
Ciomas is located to the west of Cisadane (the Sadane River), with waterways like Cisindangbarang (the Sindangbarang River) and Cikarti (the Karti River) flowing through it. Its average elevation is 222 metres above sea level.

== History ==
During the Dutch colonial period, this area was named Land Tjiomas after Tjiomas River that used to flow through it. In 1886, local farmers launched the Ciomas Peasant Rebellion (Indonesian: Pemberontakan Petani Ciomas) to revolt against landlords and the Dutch colonial government, culminating in the murder of the then Ciomas sub-district head, Haji Abdurrachim. The incident resulted in the death of about 40 people, and left 70 others injured.

Following the Independence of Indonesia, Ciomas became part of Buitenzorg Kawedanan (today's Bogor Regency). Until 1992, Ciomas remained as a district with 40 villages and an area of 100.85 square kilometres. However, from 1992 to 2001, Ciomas experienced reductions in its area and population due to three separate changes in its administrative boundaries:

- In 1992, 15 villages in the west of the district were transferred to form the new Dramaga District (kecamatan);
- In 1995, 6 villages in the east of the district were transferred to the city municipality of Bogor;
- In 2001, 8 villages in the south of the district were transferred to form the new Tamansari District (kecamatan).

== Climate ==
Ciomas has a Tropical Rainforest Climate (Af). It sees the most rainfall in November, with an average of 347 mm of precipitation; and the least amount of rainfall in August, with 104 mm of precipitation.

Climate data for Ciomas
Month	Jan	Feb	Mar	Apr	May	Jun	Jul	Aug	Sep	Oct	Nov	Dec	Year
Mean daily maximum °C (°F)	27.6 (81.7)	27.6 (81.7)	28.4 (83.1)	28.8 (83.8)	28.8 (83.8)	28.8 (83.8)	29.1 (84.4)	29.7 (85.5)	30.3 (86.5)	29.9 (85.8)	28.9 (84.0)	28.1 (82.6)	28.8 (83.9)
Daily mean °C (°F)	23.9 (75.0)	23.9 (75.0)	24.3 (75.7)	24.6 (76.3)	24.7 (76.5)	24.6 (76.3)	24.6 (76.3)	25 (77)	25.4 (77.7)	25.2 (77.4)	24.6 (76.3)	24.3 (75.7)	24.6 (76.3)
Mean daily minimum °C (°F)	21.4 (70.5)	21.4 (70.5)	21.5 (70.7)	21.5 (70.7)	21.2 (70.2)	20.8 (69.4)	20.5 (68.9)	20.7 (69.3)	21.1 (70.0)	21.4 (70.5)	21.6 (70.9)	21.6 (70.9)	21.2 (70.2)
Average rainfall mm (inches)	332 (13.1)	326 (12.8)	322 (12.7)	282 (11.1)	169 (6.7)	127 (5.0)	106 (4.2)	104 (4.1)	133 (5.2)	247 (9.7)	347 (13.7)	344 (13.5)	2,839 (111.8)
Source: Climate-Data.org

== Education ==
There are a total of 74 schools within Ciomas District (kecamatan). They can be classified as follows:

Type	Number	
Type	Public	Private
Primary schools (SD)	38	4
Junior High Schools (SMP)	3	9
Madrasah Ibtidaiyah (MI)	N/A	11
Madrasah Tsanawiyah (MTs)	N/A	9
