= Port of Ketapang =

Seaport in Indonesia

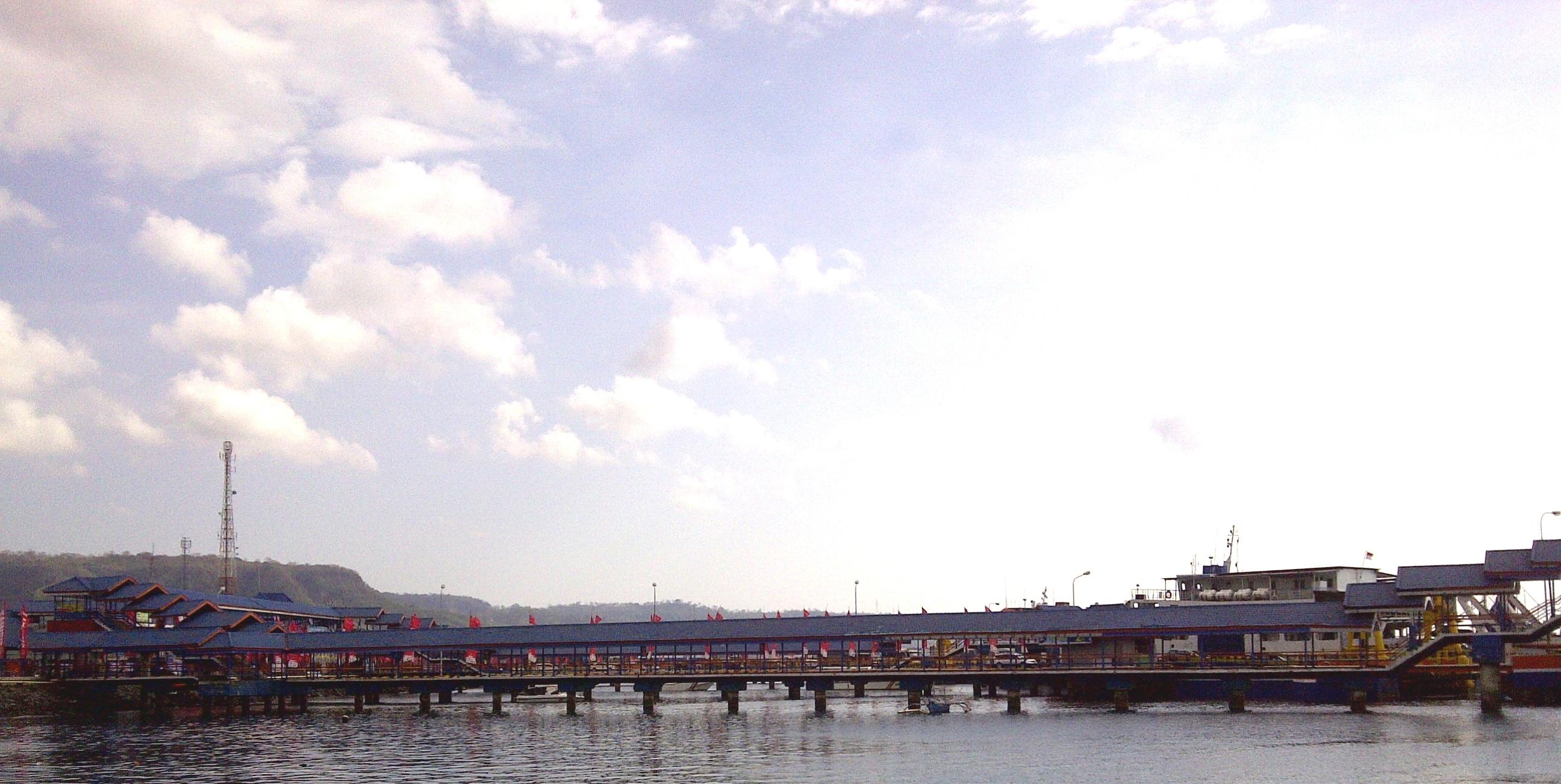
- Drone view of the port

- Location in Indonesia

Location
- Country: Indonesia
- Location: Banyuwangi Regency, East Java
- Coordinates: 8.142154°S 114.401071°E
- UN/LOCODE: ID BJU

Details
- Owned by: ASDP Indonesia Ferry
- Type of harbour: Natural seaport
- No. of wharfs: Pontoon, Hydraulics & Landing craft
- No. of piers: 4

Statistics
- Vessel arrivals: Daily
- Website www.indonesiaferry.co.id

Port of Ketapang is a ferry seaport located in Ketapang Village, Banyuwangi Regency, East Java, Indonesia that connects eastern coast of Java with Bali. The port is operated by ASDP Indonesia Ferry, a state-owned port authority company. Travellers who are planning to visit Bali via land route may ferry from this port and harbor at Port of Gilimanuk in western Bali. The average ferry duration between the two harbors are usually about 1 hour. The harbor is planned to be fully integrated with Probolinggo-Banyuwangi Toll Road in 2021.

== See also ==
- Banyuwangi Airport
- Ketapang railway station
