= Transport in Indonesia =

Indonesia's transport system has been shaped over time by the economic resource base of an archipelago with thousands of islands, and the distribution of its more than 200 million people concentrated mainly on a single island, Java.

All modes of transport play a role in the country's transport system and are generally complementary rather than competitive. Road transport is predominant, with a total system length of 548,366 kilometres (340,739 miles) in 2020. The railway system has five unconnected networks in Java, Sumatra and Sulawesi primarily dedicated to transport bulk commodities and long-distance passenger traffic.

Sea transport is extremely important for economic integration, as well as for domestic and foreign trade. It is well developed, with each of the major islands having at least one significant port city. The role of inland waterways is relatively minor and is limited to certain areas of Eastern Sumatra and Kalimantan.

The function of air transport is significant, particularly where land or water transport is deficient or non-existent. It is based on an extensive domestic airline network in which all major cities can be reached by passenger plane.

== Water transport ==
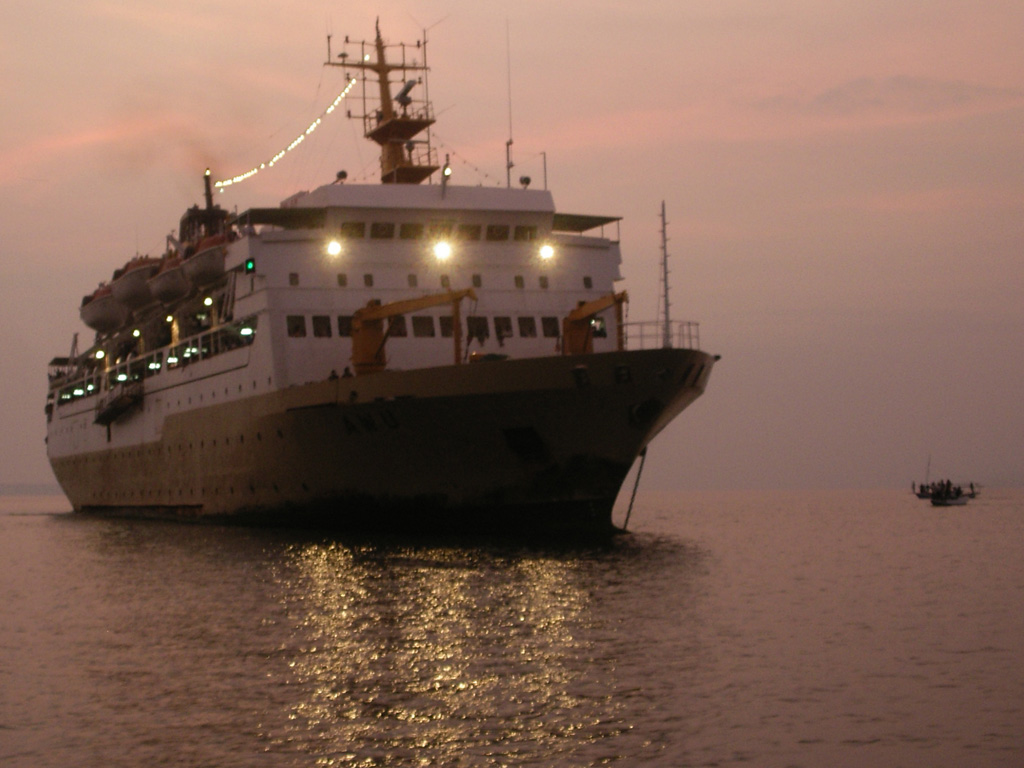
The Pelni shipping line connects several Indonesian islands.

=== Merchant marine vessels ===
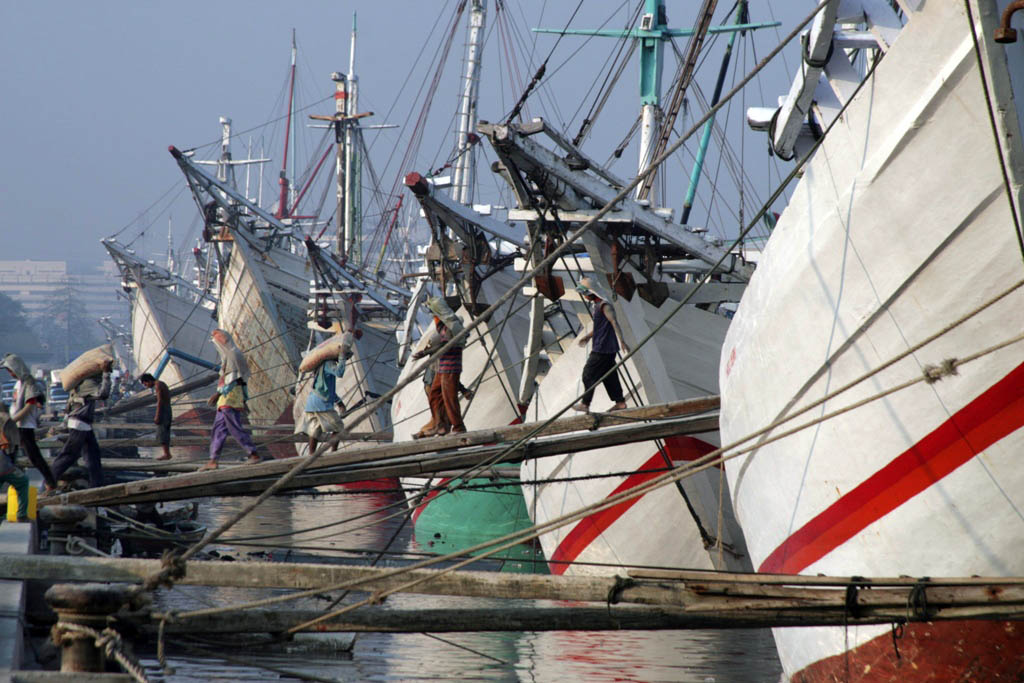
Traditional wooden Pinisi ships still used in inter-Indonesian islands freight service.

Because Indonesia encompasses a sprawling archipelago, maritime shipping provides essential links between different parts of the country. Boats in common use include large container ships, a variety of ferries, passenger ships, sailing ships, and smaller motorised vessels. The traditional wooden pinisi vessel is still widely used as the inter-island freight service within Indonesian archipelago. Main pinisi traditional harbours are Sunda Kelapa in Jakarta and Paotere harbour in Makassar.

Frequent ferry services cross the straits between nearby islands, especially in the chain of islands stretching from Sumatra through Java to the Lesser Sunda Islands. On the busy crossings between Sumatra, Java, and Bali, multiple car ferries run frequently twenty-four hours per day. There are also international ferry services between across the Straits of Malacca between Sumatra and Malaysia, and between Singapore and nearby Indonesian islands, such as Batam. Ferry services are operated by state-owned ASDP Indonesia Ferry and several private operators.

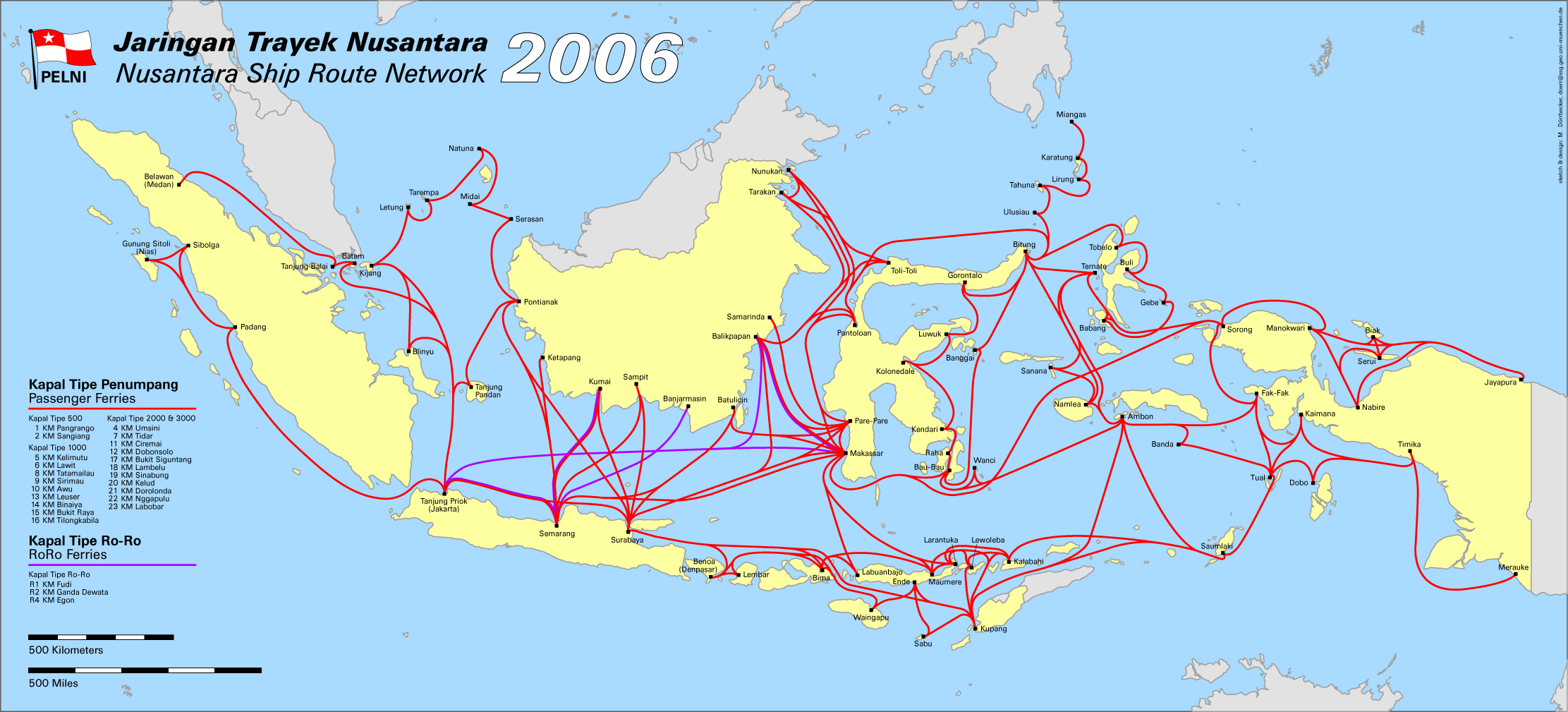
Pelni's shipping routes, 2006

A network of passenger ships makes longer connections to more remote islands, especially in the eastern part of the archipelago. The national shipping line, Pelni, provides passenger service to ports throughout the country on a two to four week schedule. These ships generally provide the least expensive way to cover long distances between islands. Smaller privately run boats provide service between islands.

On some islands, major rivers provide a key transportation link in the absence of good roads. On Kalimantan, longboats running on the rivers are the only way to reach many inland areas.

=== Waterways ===
Indonesia has 21,579 km (13,409 mi) of navigable waterways (as of 2005), of which about one half are on Kalimantan, and a quarter each on Sumatra and Papua. Waterways are highly needed because the rivers on these islands are not wide enough to hold medium-sized ships. In addition to this, roads and railways are not good options since Kalimantan and Papua are not like Java, which is a highly developed island. With the current length of waterways, Indonesia ranked seventh on the countries with longest waterways.

=== Ports and harbours ===
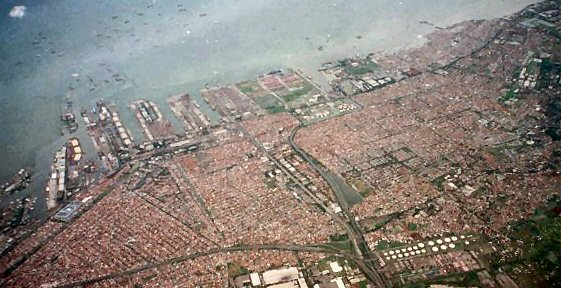
The Port of Tanjung Priok, the busiest port in Indonesia

Major ports and harbours include Bitung, Cilacap, Cirebon, Jakarta, Kupang, Palembang, Semarang, Surabaya, and Makassar. Ports are managed by the various Indonesia Port Corporations, of which there are four, numbered I through IV. Each has jurisdiction over various regions of the country, with I in the west and IV in the east. Port of Tanjung Priok in Jakarta is the Indonesia's busiest port, handling over 5.20 million TEUs.

A two-phase "New Tanjung Priok" extension project is currently underway, which will triple the existing annual capacity when fully operational in 2023. In 2015, ground breaking of the strategic North Sumatra's Kuala Tanjung Port has been completed. It is expected to accommodate 500,000 TEUs per year, overtaking Johor's Tanjung Pelepas Port and could even compete with the port of Singapore.

=== List of ship accidents and incidents in Indonesia ===
This list is a list of ship accidents and incidents sorted by year, from most recent.

==== 2025 ====
- 2 July – The Ro/Ro Ferry KMP Tunu Pratama Jaya sank on a voyage between the Port of Ketapang to Gilimanuk. As of July 20 of that year, 19 were found dead while 16 were missing. 30 people survived.
- 5 May – The Ferry KM Muchlisa sank in the waters of Penajam Paser Utara Regency, East Kalimantan (Kaltim). A number of drowned passengers have been evacuated. The location of the sunken ship is only 200 meters from the mainland of Penajam Paser Utara Regency and the Muchlisa ferry is currently sinking. The cause of the sinking of the ship is suspected to be a leak and the engine died during the incident.

==== 2023 ====
- 19 August – KM Dewi Noor 1 with 15 passengers was reported to have sunk in the Waters of the Seribu Islands, on Friday (8/19/2023). The ship loaded with building materials departed from Mutiara Beach to Sepa Island.
- 27 April – Speedboat Evelyn Calisca capsized at around 13:40 WIB in the waters of Kateman District and Burung Island. The ship departed from Pelindo Tembilahan Port, Indragiri Hilir Regency, Riau, bound for Tanjung Pinang, Riau Islands Province.

==== 2021 ====
- 29 June – The MV Yunicee Passenger Motor Ship is one of the ferries of the Ro-Ro type owned by PT. Surya Timur Line which serves the Gilimanuk-Ketapang crossing route which capsized and then sank when it was about to dock at a distance of 200–300 meters from Gilimanuk Port on 29 June 2021, at 19.20 WITA. This ship is 56.6 meters long and 8.6 meters wide.

==== 2018 ====
- 3 July – Motorboat KM Lestari Maju carrying passengers from Bulukumba to Selayar, South Sulawesi ran aground in the waters of Pabeddilang Beach, causing at least 34 deaths.
- 29 June – A speedboat carrying illegal Indonesian migrant workers from Tawau, Malaysia, collided with another speedboat in the waters of Sebatik, North Kalimantan, causing at least 8 deaths and 2 others injured missing.
- 18 June – Around 164 people are missing and 3 people died after the KM Sinar Bangun sank in Lake Toba, North Sumatra.
- 13 June – 16 people died after KM Arista capsized on its way from Paotere Port to Baranglompo Island, South Sulawesi.
- 2 May – A speedboat carrying 12 passengers from Tabonji District to Merauke City capsized in Wamal waters, Tubang District, Merauke Regency, Papua, and caused 11 people to go missing.
- 20 February – The ferry Kayong Utara carrying 31 passengers, eight trucks, one private car and two motorbikes from Muntok, Bangka Belitung capsized when entering the waters of Tanjung Api-api, Banyuasin, South Sumatra.
- 1 January – 8 people died after the MV Anugrah Express fast boat capsized in the waters of the Tanjung Api-api river, Tanjung Selor, North Kalimantan.

==== 2017 ====
- 19 May – Five passengers died and 24 others went missing in the burning of KM Mutiara Sentosa I disaster in the waters of Masalembu, Sumenep, East Java Province.
- 1 January – 23 passengers died in the burning of KM Zahro Express disaster in the waters of Kepulauan Seribu, Jakarta.

==== 2009 ====
- 22 November – Dumai Express 10 Ship Disaster in the waters of Tanjung Balai Karimun, Riau Islands caused by bad weather. The incident resulted in 28 deaths (details attached), 12 missing and 12 hospitalized at Tanjung Balai Karimun Regional Hospital and 2 at Balai Health Center.
- 28 August – KM Sari Mulia Ship For the search for victims on the third day, two more bodies were found by SAR officers. With that, the total number of victims found has reached 21 passengers.
- 27 July – Cahaya Abadi Utama sank in Makassar Strait, A wooden ship loaded with 50 tons of corn and 3,000 bunches of bananas sailed from Budonbudon District, Mamuju Regency, South Sulawesi to Samarinda on Monday (7/27) morning. "All crew members are safe, there were no fatalities," said Assistant Police Commissioner Handoko
- 11 January – KM Teratai Prima Motor Ship 0 sank in Tanjung Baturoro, Sendana, Majene, West Sulawesi; of the approximately 300 victims, only 36 were rescued by fishermen.

==== 2008 ====
- 31 August, The MV Belanak passenger motor ship (KMP) was a ferry type owned by PT Angkutan Sungai Danau and The crossing (ASDP) hit a speedboat belonging to a pamuge fisherman (fish buyer in the middle of the sea) in the waters of the West Coast, precisely 1.5 miles from Putri Island to the west, Sunday (31/8) morning at around 05.30 WIB.
- 28 August, the Ro-ro Dharma Ferry 3 ship departing from Makassar (South Sulawesi) to Balikpapan (East Kalimantan), caught fire when it was about to dock at the Semayang Port pier at around 11.00.
- 18 May, the Ro-ro Dharma Kencana ship from Semarang to Sampit caught fire. At around 12.00 WIB the ill-fated ship caught fire. The location of the burning ship was around 20 miles from Sampit port. The evacuation of passengers was done by the self-help of the Ship's Crew (ABK).

==== 2007 ====
- 18 October – KM Asita III sank at 11.00. 20.16 WITA in the waters of Kadatua Strait, about 10 miles from Baubau City, Buton Island, Southeast Sulawesi, 125 people survived, at least 31 people died, and 35 others were missing.
- 11 July – KM Sinar Madinah sank in the waters of the South Sea of Hu'u Village, Dompu Regency, West Nusa Tenggara province. The ship sank after being hit by waves as high as five meters. Seven crew members were entangled in the net, but six managed to save themselves. A crew member was missing along with the net that entangled him.
- 11 July – KM Wahai Star carrying around 100 passengers and thousands of tons of agricultural products from Leksula bound for Ambon sank in the waters between Buru Island and Ambon.
- 22 February – At least 25 people died after the KM Levina I en route Tanjung Priok–Pangkal Balam, Bangka carrying 291 passengers caught fire in the Sunda Strait. 4 of them died while investigating the wreck on 25 February. They died when the wreck sank.

==== 2006 ====
- 30 December – Fishermen died when their boat was rolled by waves in the waters of Paciran, Lamongan Regency.
- 28 December – KM Tristar I disaster that sank in the Bangka Strait. Only 3 floating bodies were found.

==== 2005 ====
- 8 July – KM Digoel accident in the Arafura Sea. It is estimated that 84 people were found dead and the fate of 100 passengers is still unknown.

==== 2004 ====
- 15 January – KM Sutra Alam 02 hit by the 2004 Aceh Tsunami in the waters Pulau We. Death toll reaches 176, ship dragged almost to shore.

==== 2003 ====
- 7 September – Passenger Motor Ship MV Wimala Dharma crash in the waters of the Lombok Strait, about 4.5 nautical miles from Gili Tapekong, West Nusa Tenggara, Sunday (7/9) early morning at around 03.30. 5 passengers died.

==== 2002 ====
- 20 November – KMP Adidas collided with KMP Sinar Akaba in the waters of Hari Island, Kendari Regency, Southeast Sulawesi, about 25 miles southeast of Kendari port. KMP Sinar Akaba sank, one passenger died and others were seriously injured.

==== 1981 ====
- 27 January – KMP Tampomas II Disaster. The incident that began with the ship hitting the reef on 25, was the biggest tragedy at that time with 1162 people killed.

== Roads and highways ==
A wide variety of vehicles are used for transportation on Indonesia's roads. Bus services are available in most areas connected to the road network. Between major cities, especially on Sumatra, Java, and Bali, services are frequent and direct; many express services are available with no stops until the final destination.

=== Intercity bus ===
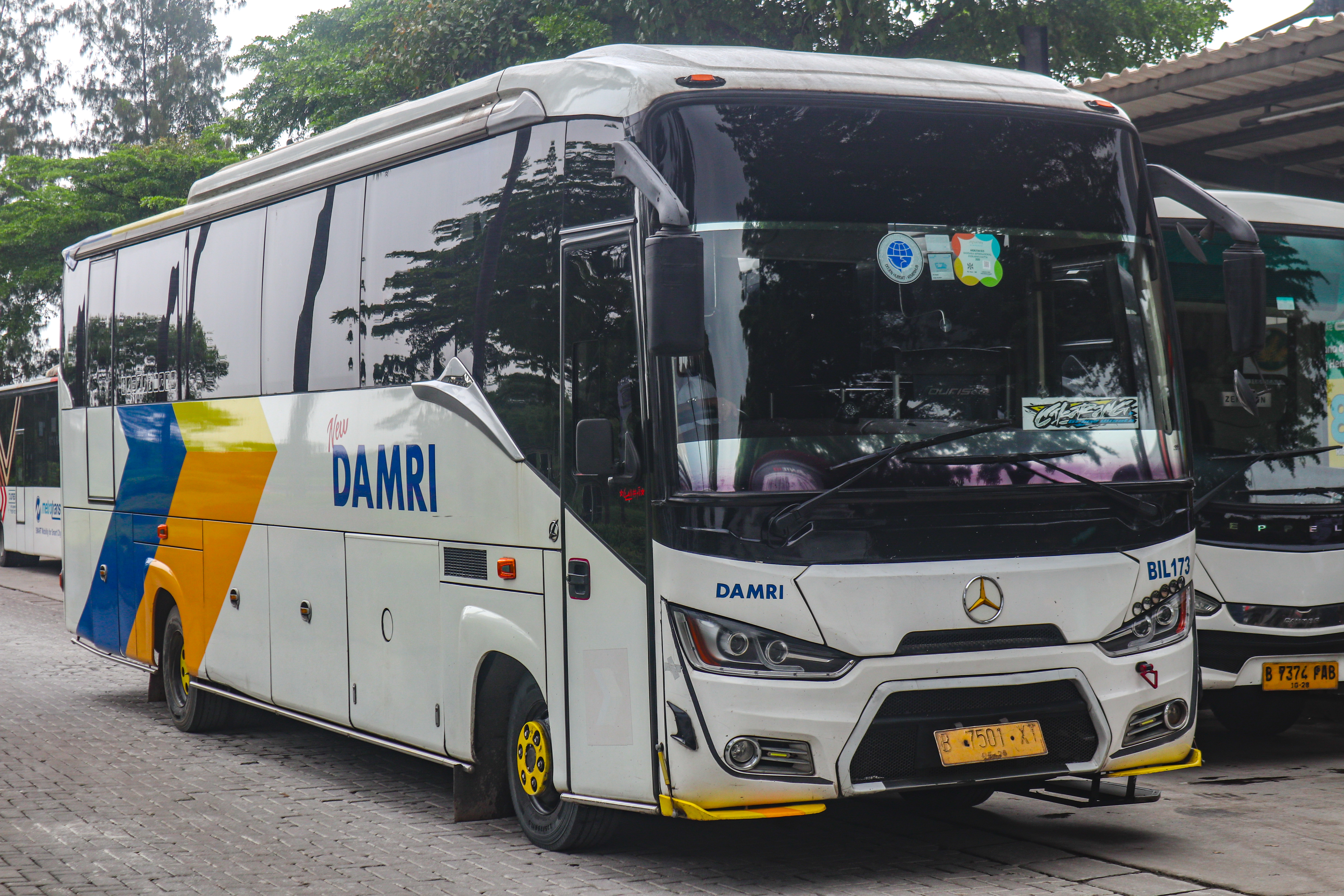
An Indonesian intercity bus operated by Perum DAMRI, traveling across Indonesia, connecting cities in different provinces as well as within the same province.

The intercity bus service has become the major provider of land transportation service connecting Indonesian cities, either within an island or inter-island connected through ferry crossings. The intercity bus operator companies are called P.O. (perusahaan otobus in Indonesian) with several major companies operating mainly in Java and Sumatra. The longest intercity bus service in Indonesia is a route operated by P.O. Antar Lintas Sumatera (ALS) connecting Medan in North Sumatra and Jember in East Java. It is a week long bus travel covering a distance of 2,920 kilometers.

The surge of intercity bus travel in Indonesia took place after the completion of Trans-Java highway section connecting Jakarta and Surabaya in 2018. During this time, some intercity bus services began operating fleet of double decker busses.

=== City bus ===
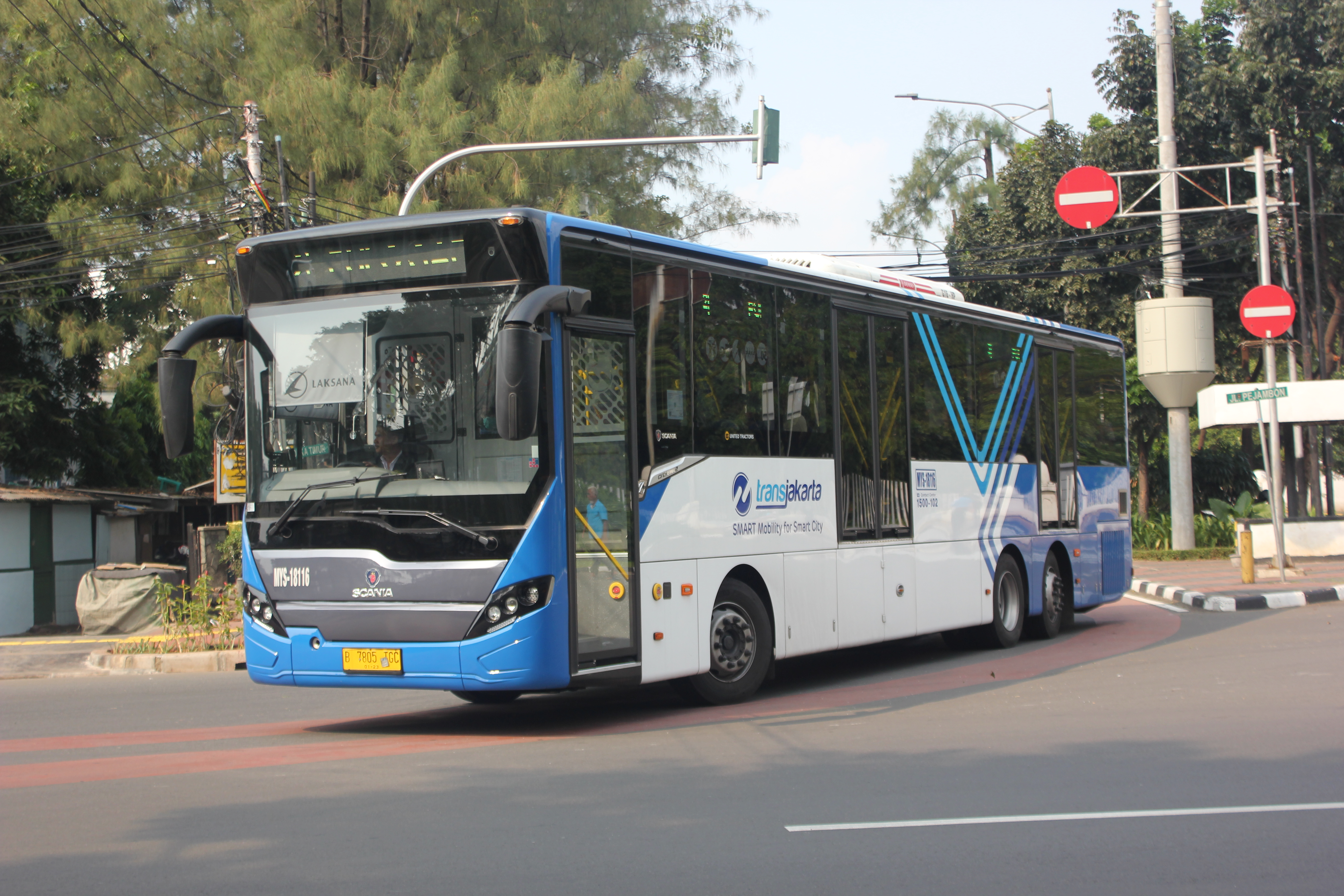
Transjakarta bus rapid transit

Some major cities has urban transit bus service, or a more sophisticated form of bus rapid transit (BRT). The largest one, Transjakarta system in Jakarta, is the longest bus rapid transit system in the world that boasts some 230.9 kilometres (143.5 miles) in 13 corridors and 10 cross-corridor routes and carrying 430,000 passengers daily in 2016. Other cities such as Yogyakarta (Trans Jogja), Surabaya (Suroboyo Bus & Trans Semanggi Suroboyo), Palembang, Bandung (Trans Metro Pasundan), Surakarta (Batik Solo Trans), Denpasar, Pekanbaru, Semarang (Trans Semarang), Makassar, Bogor, Padang, and Batam also have BRT systems in place without segregated lanes.

=== List of bus accidents in Indonesia ===
Below is a list of bus accidents that occurred in Indonesia that resulted in fatalities.

- In 1981, the PO Flores bus accident from Mojokerto, East Java, experienced a fatal accident in Surakarta, Central Java that killed a group of junior high school students. The bloody tragedy occurred when PO Flores was hit by a fast train from Pasar Senen-Solo Balapan.
- A Metromini bus tragedy in 1994 killed 33 passengers. The victims died because the MetroMini crashed off a bridge and fell into the Sunter River, which at that time had a rising water level. Most of the victims drowned in the Sunter River, Jakarta.
- On 8 October 2003, a tour bus owned by AO Transport carrying mostly schoolchildren collided with two trucks near Situbondo, East Java, killing 54 people. The crash was also called Paiton bus crash or Paiton tragedy due to its location near Paiton thermal power station.
- On 7 February 2011, a PO. Tri Sakti bus accident was a traffic accident in Temanggung on 7 February 2011. The Tri Sakti bus on the Semarang-Yogyakarta route had an accident because it failed to overtake the vehicle in front of it and hit a truck, the bus then plunged into a ravine. The accident that occurred in Pingit, Pringsurat, Temanggung Regency caused 11 people to die and 37 people to be injured.
- On 10 February 2018, the Premium Passion bus accident was a traffic accident incident that occurred at Tanjakan Emen, Subang, West Java. The tourist bus was carrying a tour group from the Permata Savings and Loans Cooperative, and resulted in 26 fatalities.
- On 17 June 2014, the Desiana bus accident was a tragic incident that befell the PO. Desiana tourist bus with license plate number B 7529 YB carrying a group of Al-Huda High School students from Cengkareng, East Jakarta. The bus experienced brake failure and hit a Kijang Kapsul car on the Emen Hill, Subang, West Java. This accident resulted in 8 people dying and left deep trauma for the study tour group.
- On 17 June 2019, A bus accident PO. Safari Lux occurred on the Cikopo–Palimanan Toll Road (Cipali Toll Road), Majalengka, West Java Province. The bus accident also involved three other vehicles, including a Mitsubishi Xpander, a Toyota Innova, and a Mitsubishi truck. A total of 12 people were declared dead in this incident. Initially, the police suspected that the accident was caused by a sleepy bus driver. Later, examination of several witnesses indicated that an incident occurred in the bus cockpit as the basis for the fatal accident.
- On 10 March 2021, A tourist bus PO. Sri Padma Kencana accident occurred on at Tanjakan Cae, Sukajadi Village, Wado District, Sumedang Regency, West Java. The Sri Padma Kencana tourist bus carrying a group of SMP IT Al Muawwanah, Subang, study tour and pilgrimage plunged into a ravine and resulted in a total of 29 deaths.
- On 6 February 2022, the PO Gandhos Abadi bus accident was a single accident that occurred on 6 February 2022, in Bukit Bego, Imogiri, Bantul, Yogyakarta. This accident killed 13 passengers and several others were injured. The initial suspicion of the cause of the accident was brake failure, causing the bus to hit a cliff
- On 11 May 2024, a fatal traffic accident occurred in Subang Regency, West Java Province, Indonesia, when a tour bus PO. Putera Fajar carrying a group of students and teachers from a vocational high school experienced brake failure, causing the bus to crash into 1 car and 3 motorbikes. The accident resulted in 11 fatalities and 53 injuries, 13 of whom were seriously injured.
- On 6 May 2025, An intercity b bus PT. Antar Lintas Sumatera carrying 34 passengers from Medan to Bekasi sped out of control on a downhill road and overturned in West Sumatra province on Tuesday, killing at least 12 people and leaving others injured, police said.

=== Taxis and autorickshaws ===
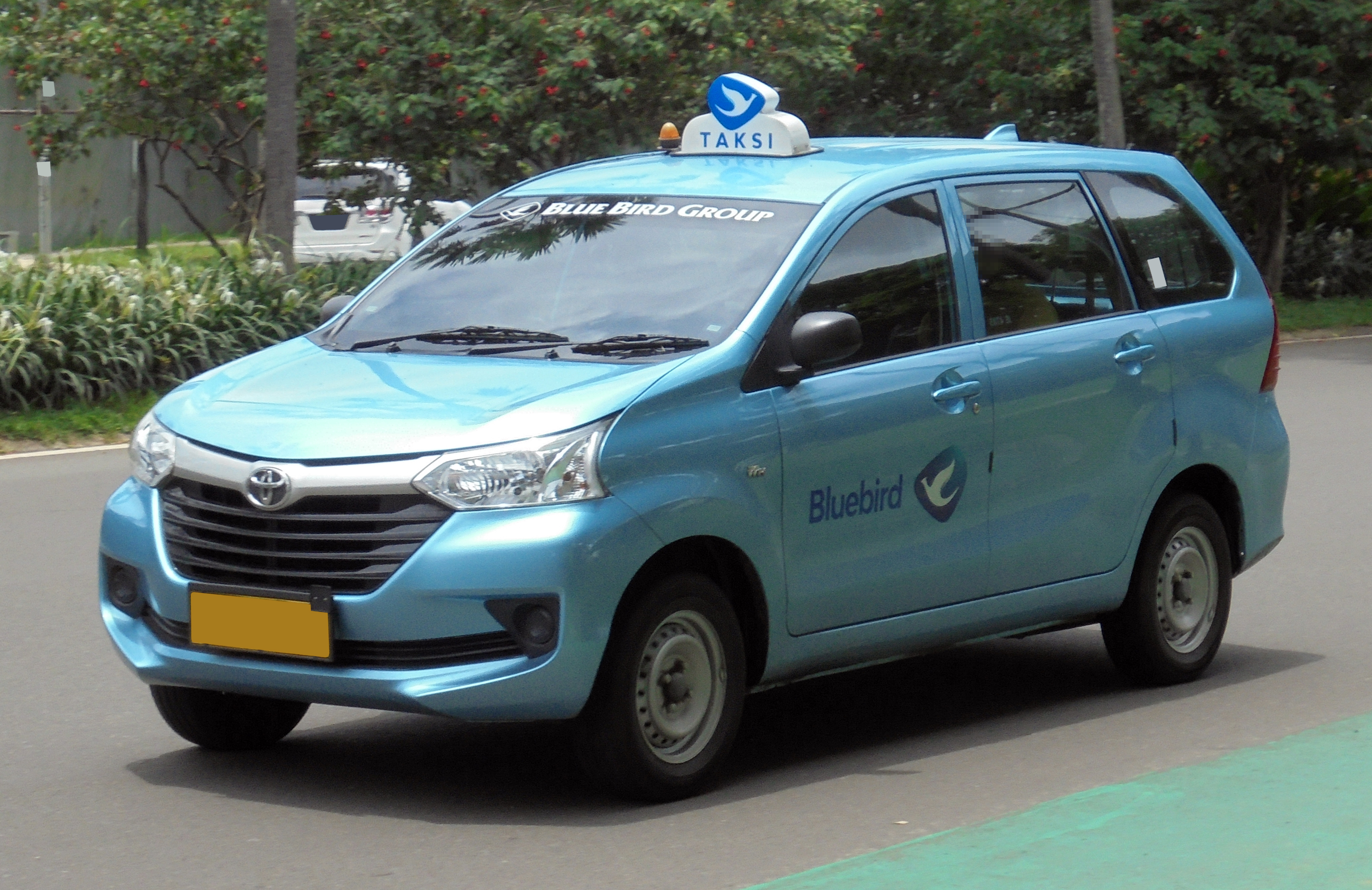
A Bluebird taxi in Jakarta

Many cities and towns have some form of transportation for hire available as well such as taxis. Many cities also have motorised autorickshaws (bajaj) of various kinds. Cycle rickshaws, called becak in Indonesia, are a regular sight on city roads and provide inexpensive transportation. They have been blamed for causing traffic congestion and, consequently, banned from most parts of Jakarta in 1972. Horse-drawn carts are found in some cities and towns.

Ridesharing companies have become serious competition to both taxicabs and motorcycle taxis (ojek), with the four providers being Gojek, Maxim, Anterin, Grab and others.

=== Minibus ===
In more remote areas, and between smaller towns, most services are provided with minibuses or minivans (angkot). Buses and vans are also the primary form of transportation within cities. Often, these are operated as share taxis, running semi-fixed routes.

=== Private cars ===
Due to the increasing purchasing power of Indonesians, private cars are becoming more common especially in major cities. However the growth of the number of cars increasingly outpaces the construction of new roads, resulting in frequently crippling traffic jams in large parts in major cities especially in Jakarta, which often also happen on highways. Jakarta also has one of the worst traffic jams in the world.

Indonesia has been gradually introducing an Intelligent Transportation System (ITS) since 2012. ITS Indonesia was formed on 26 April 2011.

=== National routes ===
Indonesia has about 283,102 kilometres (175,911 mi) of paved highways and 213,505 kilometres (132,666 mi) of unpaved highways (As of 2011 estimate). Four of Indonesia's main highways are classified as parts of Asian Highway Network: AH2 section in Java and Bali, AH25 and AH151 in Sumatra, AH152 in Java and AH150 section in Kalimantan. Some of them has been numbered, currently only in Java and (partially) Sumatera.

National routes of Indonesia pass through the hearts of most main cities, and are designed to connect between city centres. They act as main inter-city route outside the tollways. A national route has to be passable by logistic trucks, while simultaneously handling the common traffic. National routes in Java are numbered, while those outside Java aren't. In some cities, even in crowded districts, national routes often form bypasses or ring roads (Indonesian: jalan lingkar) around the city to prevent inter-city traffic entering the city center.

Ministry of Public Works and People's Housing is responsible to these networks, except DKI Jakarta part from Jakarta Inner Ring Road to Jakarta Outer Ring Road. A national route can be revised if it serves unable to handle the traffic. It would usually be handled by the province/regional government.

Below were lists of some national routes in Indonesia:

- Sumatra: Trans-Sumatra Highway
- Java: North Coast, South Coast
- Kalimantan: Trans-Kalimantan Highway (Northern, Central, Southern)
- Sulawesi: Trans-Sulawesi Highway
- Papua: Trans-Papua Highway

=== Toll roads ===
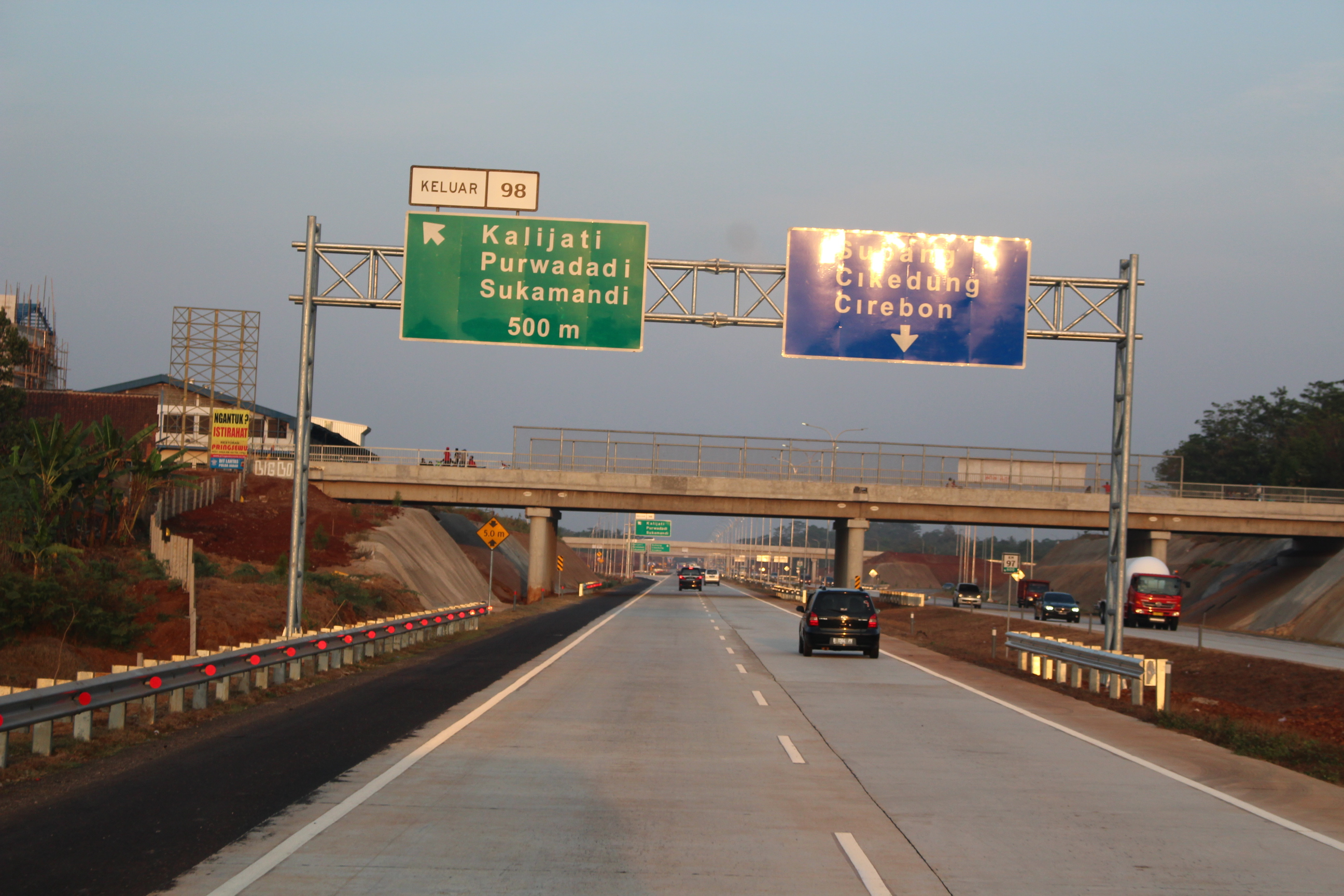
Cikopo–Palimanan (Cipali) Toll Road, part of Trans-Java Toll Road in Indonesia

All expressways in Indonesia are toll roads, known locally as jalan tol (lit. toll road). The first expressway in Indonesia is the Jagorawi Toll Road, opened in 1978. 2,386 kilometers of expressways are operating as of 2021. Over 568 kilometres (353 mi) of expressways opened during the first term of President Joko Widodo, surpassing previous administrations. Since 2018, all expressways do not accept any cash tolls; all tolls must be paid with certain contactless money cards.

The high cost of building and maintaining a national highway system means that Indonesia has to outsource the construction and maintenance to private and state-owned companies. Indonesia has an extensive system of highways consisting of:

==== Sulawesi ====
- Makassar-Sultan Hasanuddin International Airport Toll Road
- Manado-Bitung Toll Road

==== Lesser Sunda Islands ====
Serangan-Tanjung Benoa Toll Road: The toll road between Tanjung Benoa to Airport and from Airport to Serangan, all in direct line (not curve) is 12.7 kilometres and is equipped also with motorcycle lanes. The toll road is formally opened on 23 September 2013, about a week before APEC Summit in Bali is opened.

==== Kalimantan ====
- Samarinda-Balikpapan Toll Road

== Railways ==
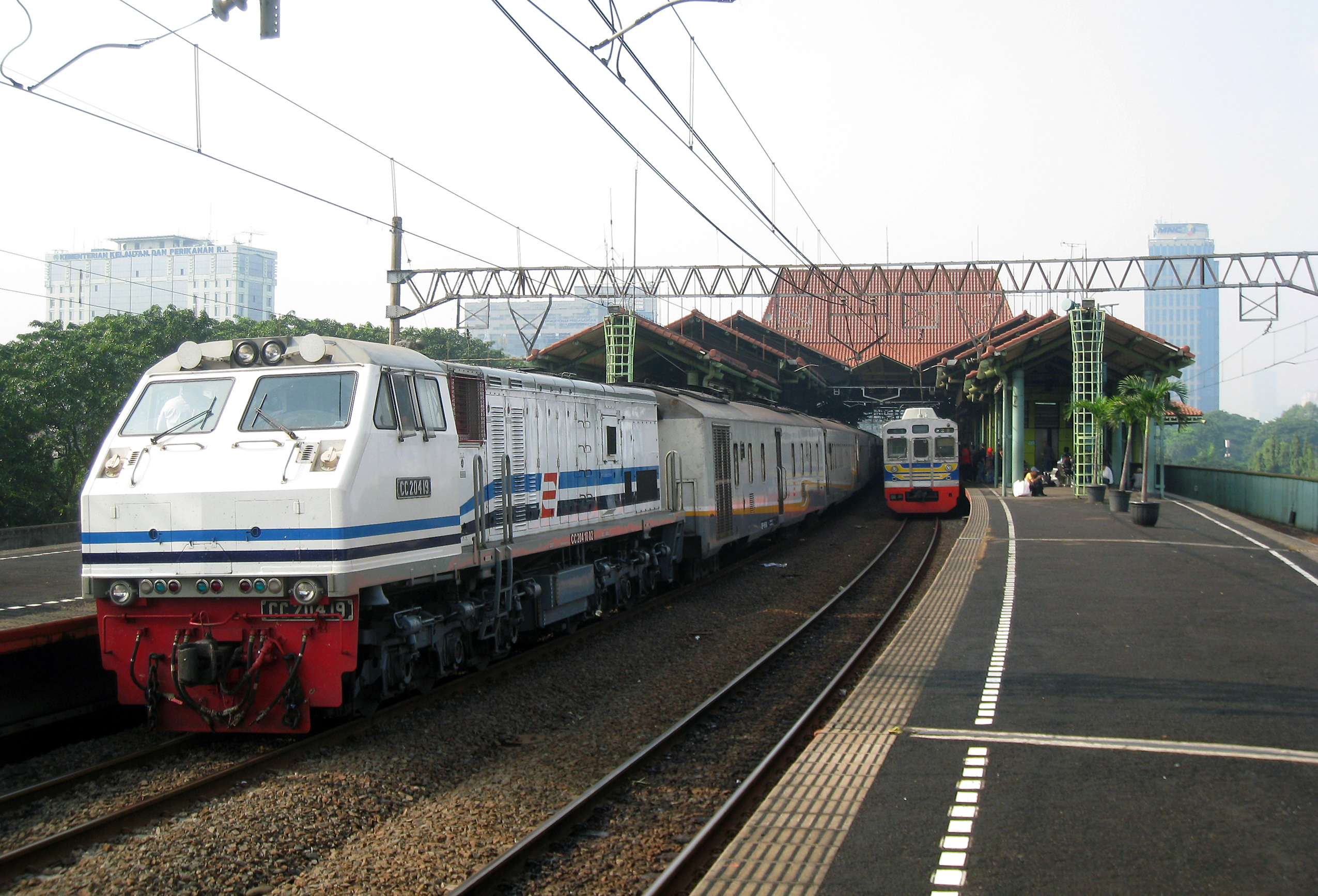
An inter-city and a commuter train at Gambir railway station.

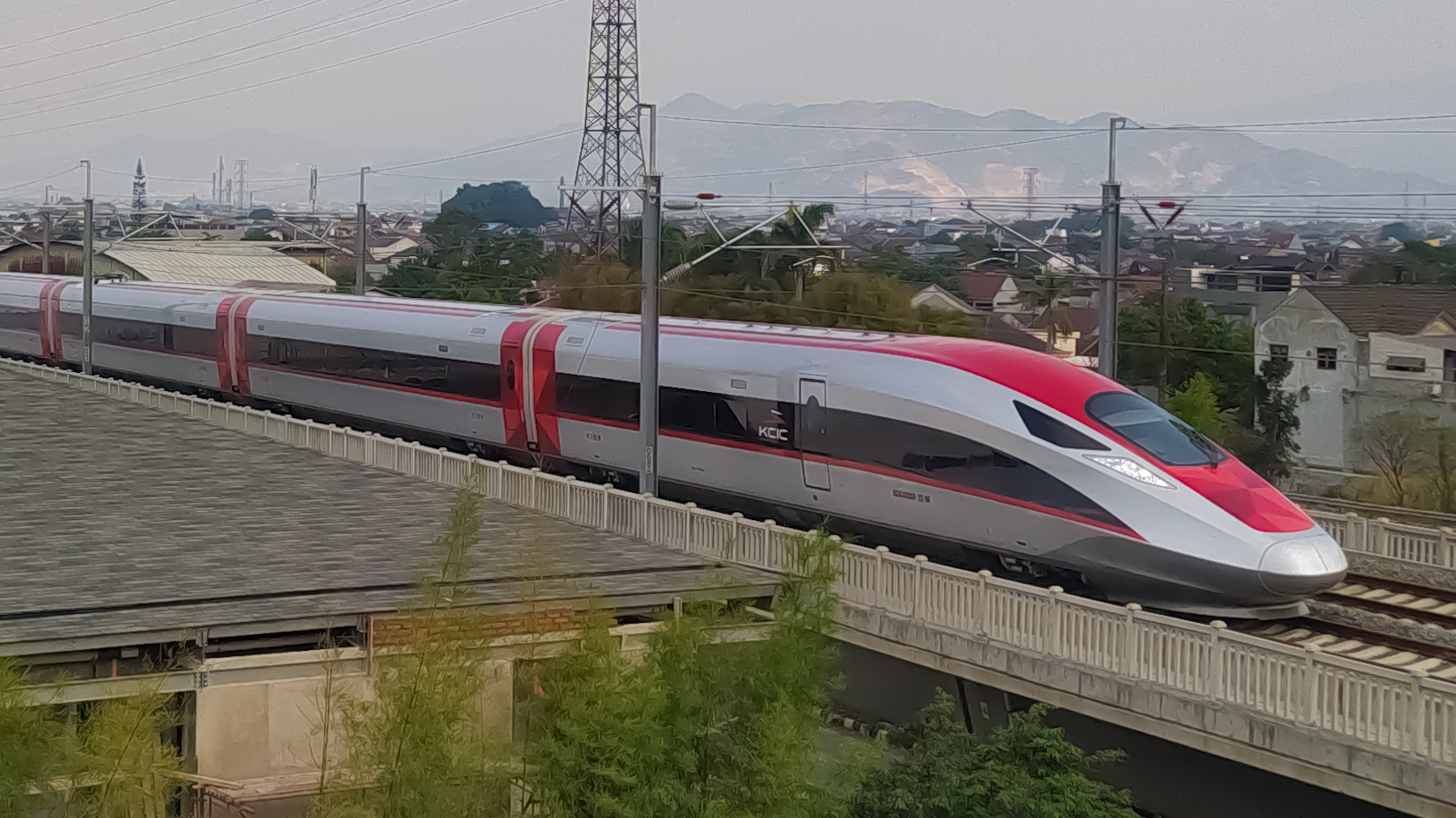
An Indonesian inter-city high speed train at Bandung.

Indonesia's main railways, operated by Kereta Api Indonesia and its subsidiaries, is used for both passenger and freight transport.

The majority of railways is located on Java. There are four separate railway networks on Sumatra: one in Aceh, one in North Sumatra (Aceh connection proposed to be finished in the 2020s), another in West Sumatra, and the final one in South Sumatra and Lampung. South Sulawesi has railway network in Barru Regency as the impact of Trans-Sulawesi Railway construction, the first phase includes 146 kilometers route from Makassar to Parepare, which was completed in November 2022 and has been operating ever since. There are no railways in other parts of Indonesia, although new networks are being developed on islands such as Kalimantan and Papua.

The inter-city rail network is complemented by local commuter rail services, particularly in Jakarta metropolitan area and Surabaya. In Jakarta, the KRL Commuterline service carries more than a million passengers a day. Urban rail networks are also exists in few cities. Palembang LRT began operations in 2018, the first of such kind. The Jakarta MRT and Jakarta LRT began operations in 2019, with the Greater Jakarta LRT system being constructed and it commenced official commercial operations on 28 August 2023, after 11 days of Indonesian Independence Day.

The government's plan to build a high-speed rail (HSR) was announced in 2015, the first in Indonesia and Southeast Asia. It is expected to connect the capital Jakarta with Bandung, covering a distance of around 140 kilometres (87 miles). Plans were also mentioned for its possible extension to Surabaya, the country's second largest city. In 2023, the Jakarta-Bandung High-Speed Rail construction partially finished and is set to start commercial operation starting October 2023. The Jakarta-Bandung HSR began trial operation with passengers on 7 September 2023 and commercial operations on 2 October 2023.

== Pipelines ==
As of 2013, Indonesia has pipelines for condensate 1,064 km (661 mi), condensate/gas 150 km (93 mi), gas 11,702 km (7,271 mi), liquid petroleum gas 119 km (74 mi), oil 7,767 km (4,826 mi), oil/gas/water 77 km (48 mi), refined products 728 km (452 mi), and water 44 km (27 mi).

== Air transport ==
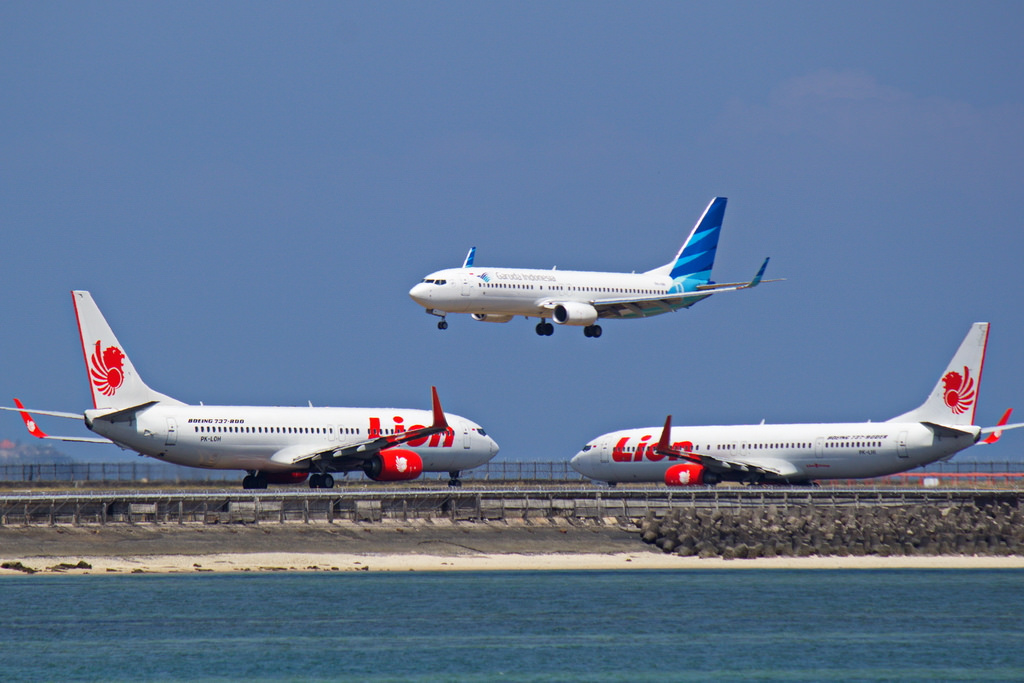
Garuda Indonesia and Lion Air aeroplanes at Ngurah Rai International Airport, Bali in 2014

Air transport in Indonesia serves as a critical means of connecting the thousands of islands throughout the archipelago. Indonesia is the largest archipelagic country in the world, extending 5,120 km (3,181 mi) from east to west and 1,760 km (1,094 mi) from north to south, comprising 13,466 islands, with 922 of those permanently inhabited. (Note: Based on "Seminar Nasional Penetapan Nama Pulau-pulau Kecil Dalam Perspektif Sejarah or "National Seminar on naming smaller islands regarded from historical perspective", 16 to 18 July 2008 at Palembang, South Sumatra, Indonesia) With an estimated population of over 255 million people – making it the world's fourth-most-populous country – and also due to the growth of the middle-class, the boom of low-cost carriers in the recent decade, and overall economic growth, many domestic travellers shifted from land and sea transport to faster and more comfortable air travel. Indonesia is widely regarded as an emerging market for air travel in the region. Between 2009 and 2014, the number of Indonesian air passengers increased from 27,421,235 to 94,504,086, an increase of over threefold.

However, safety issues continue to be a persistent problem in Indonesian aviation. Several accidents have given Indonesia's air transport system the reputation of the least safe in the world. Indonesian aviation faces numerous challenges, including poorly maintained, outdated, and often overwhelmed infrastructure, the factor of human error, bad weather, haze problems caused by plantation fires, and volcanic ash spewed by numerous volcanoes that disrupts air transportation.

The Indonesian Air Force has 34,930 personnel equipped with 224 aircraft, among them 110 combat aircraft. The Indonesian Air Force possesses and operates numerous military air bases and military airstrips across the archipelago.

The International Air Transport Association (IATA) has predicted that Indonesia will become the world's sixth largest air travel market by 2034. Around 270 million passengers are predicted to fly from and within Indonesia by 2034.

=== Airports ===
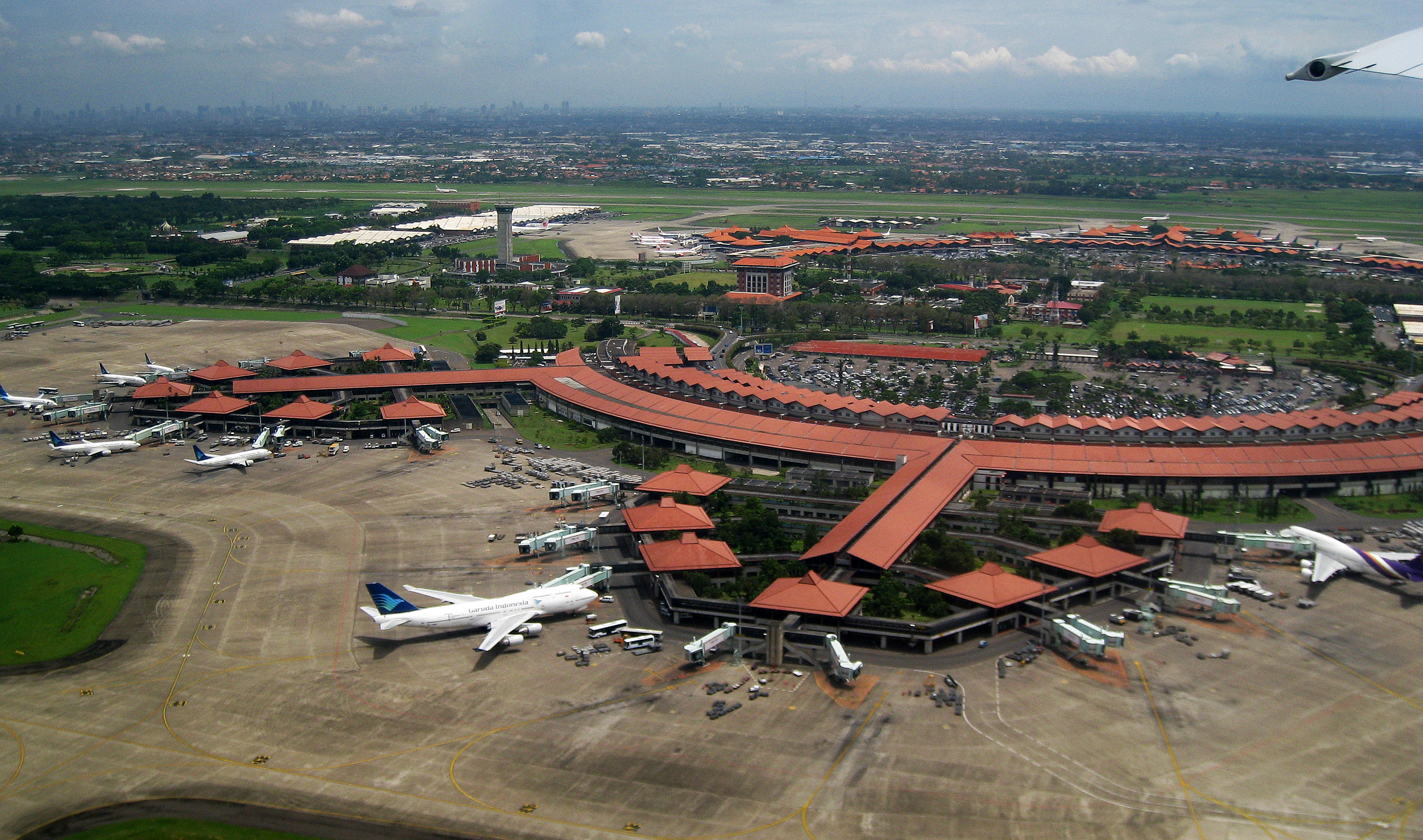
Soekarno–Hatta International Airport, the busiest in Indonesia and Southeast Asia

As of 2013, there are 673 airports in Indonesia, 186 of those have paved runways, and 487 have unpaved runways. As of 2013, there are 76 heliports in Indonesia. Jakarta's Soekarno–Hatta International Airport serves as the country's main air transportation hub as well as the nation's busiest. Since 2010, it has become the busiest airport in Southeast Asia, surpassing Suvarnabhumi and Changi airports. In 2017, it became the 17th busiest airport in the world with 62.1 million passengers.

=== Airlines ===
In Indonesia, there are 22 commercial scheduled airlines that carry more than 30 passengers, and 32 commercial scheduled airlines that transport 30 or less passengers, as well as chartered airlines. Some notable Indonesian airlines, among others, include Garuda Indonesia, the government-owned flag carrier of Indonesia, Lion Air, currently the largest private low-cost carrier airline in Indonesia, Sriwijaya Air, currently the largest medium service regional carrier in Indonesia, also the country's third largest carrier, and Indonesia AirAsia, the Indonesian branch of Malaysian-based AirAsia.

== Mudik ==
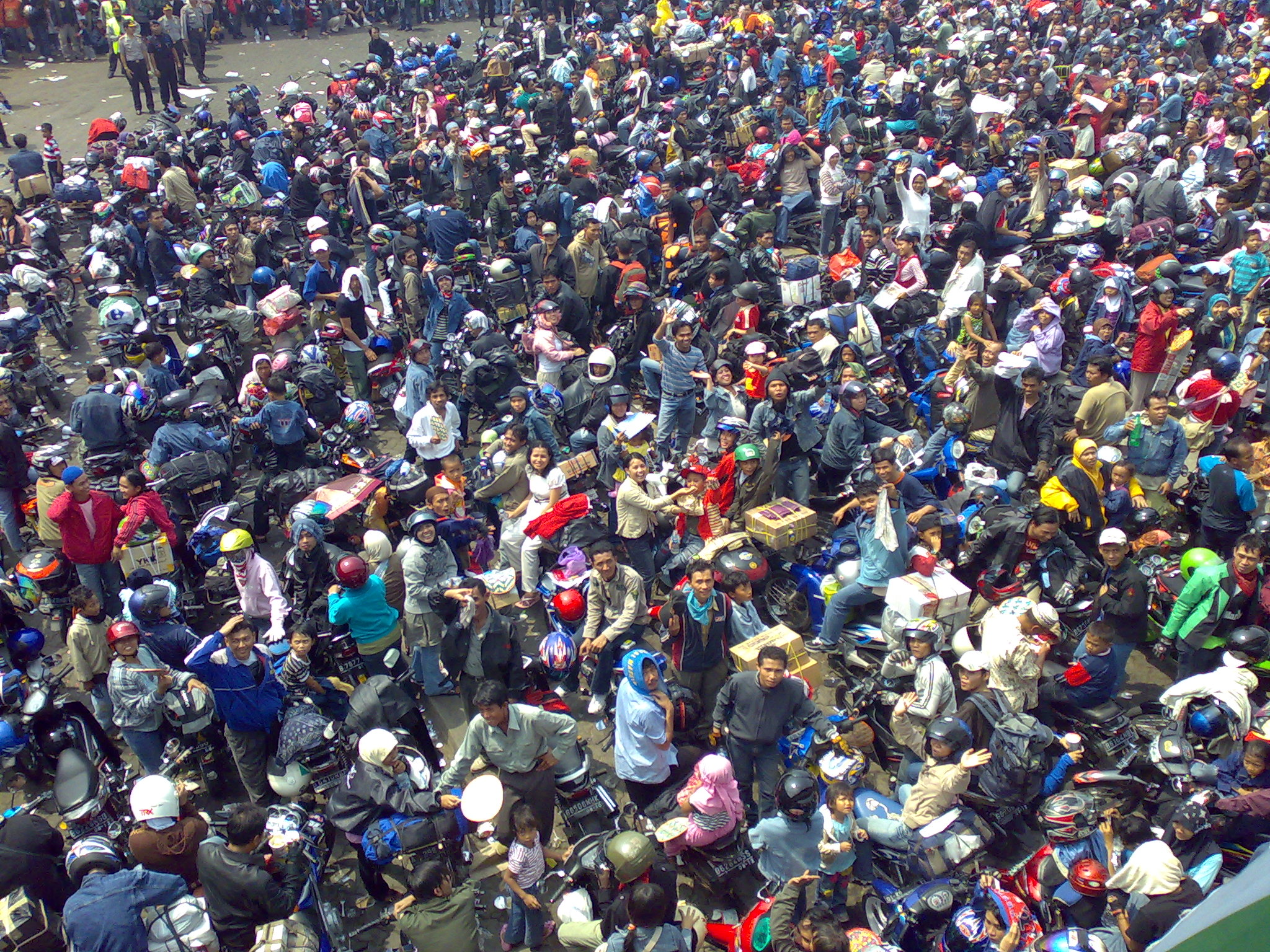
Thousands of motorcyclist families waiting for the ferry at the Port of Merak during mudik

Mudik, or Pulang Kampung, is an Indonesian term for the activity where migrants or migrant workers return to their hometown or village during or before major holidays, especially Lebaran (Eid al-Fitr). Although the mudik homecoming travel before Lebaran takes place in most Indonesian urban centers, the highlight is on the nation's largest urban agglomeration; Greater Jakarta, as millions of Jakartans exit the city by various means of transportation, overwhelming train stations and airports and also clogging highways, especially the Trans-Java toll road and Java's Northern Coast Road.

In 2023 it was estimated that the people that took annual mudik travel reached 123 million people. The demand for train and airplane tickets usually spikes a month or two prior to Lebaran, prompting an unusually higher cost for tickets for highly sought days of departure. Some airlines might add extra flights or operate larger airplanes to deal with the surge in demand.

Indonesian train operator Kereta Api Indonesia usually offers additional train trips or introduces longer trains with more cars in order to meet the demand. The private operators of intercity and interprovince buses usually charge higher ticket costs during this period. The impact is indeed tremendous as millions of buses, cars and motorcycles jam the roads and highways, causing kilometres of traffic jams each year.

== See also ==
- City bus in Greater Jakarta
- City bus in Surabaya
- Bus transport in Indonesia
- Transport in Jakarta
- Ministry of Transportation
- Pengangkutan Penumpang Djakarta
- Suroboyo Bus
