= ASDP Indonesia Ferry =

Indonesian state-owned passenger ferry operator

PT ASDP Indonesia Ferry (Persero)

- ASDP Indonesia Ferry headquarters in Jakarta
- Formerly: Perum ASDP (1986-1992); PT ASDP (1992-2004)
- Type: State-owned perseroan terbatas
- Industry: Ferry transport
- Predecessor: PASDF (1973-1980); PASDP (1980-1986)
- Founded: 1973
- Headquarters: Jakarta
- Area served: Indonesia
- Key people: Heru Widodo (President Director); Achmad Baidowi (President Commissioner)
- Revenue: Rp 3.550 trillion (2021)
- Net income: Rp 326 billion (2021)
- Owner: Government of Indonesia
- Number of employees: 4,627
- Website: www.asdp.id

ASDP Indonesia Ferry
- Locale: Indonesia
- Transit type: Ferry
- Owner: Government of Indonesia
- Began operation: 1973
- No. of lines: 307
- No. of vessels: 226
- No. of terminals: 36

ASDP Indonesia Ferry (ASDP) is an Indonesian state-owned passenger ferry operator. The company is headquartered in Central Jakarta and has 27 branches in four regional offices across Indonesia. As of 2025, it operates 226 ships throughout the country, serves 49 million passengers, making it one of the largest ferry operators in the world.

== History ==
ASDP was originally established in 1973 during the presidency of Soeharto, under the PASDF (Proyek Angkutan Sungai, Danau, dan Ferry — River, Lake, and Ferry Transportation Project) within the Directorate of River, Lake, and Ferry Transportation Traffic (DLLASDF) and the Directorate General of Land Transportation of the Ministry of Transportation. Soeharto aimed to connect the land route from Banda Aceh, at the northernmost tip of Sumatra, to Lospalos in the easternmost part of Timor Island.

In 1980, PASDF was changed to PASDP (Proyek Angkutan Sungai Danau dan Penyeberangan — River, Lake, and Crossing Transportation Project), and in 1992 it became PT Angkutan Sungai Danau dan Penyeberangan (Persero). In 2004, the company adopted its current name, PT ASDP Indonesia Ferry (Persero), as part of a business transformation and rebranding process.

Ira Puspadevi served as president director of PT ASDP Indonesia Ferry from 2017 until 2024. In 2025, she and two colleagues were convicted over the acquisition of PT Jembatan Nusantara, which investigators said caused financial losses to the state.

== Fleet and ports ==
As of 2025, ASDP owns and operates 226 ships of various sizes as well as 36 dedicated ferry ports across Indonesia.

=== Fleet ===
Name	Year built	Route	Gross Tonnage
BRR	2007	Banda Aceh-Sabang	911
Papuyu	1992	Banda Aceh-Lamteng-Sabang	284
Teluk Sinabang	2006	Meulaboh-Sinabang	750
Tandemand	1990	Batam-Sei Pakning	646
Lome	2008	Batam-Sungai Selari	534
Belanak	2002	Palembang-Muntok	1163
Menumbing Raya	2008	Palembang-Muntok	652
Tanjung Burang	1991	Batam-Tanjung uban	540
Barau	1992	Batam-Tanjung Uban	540
Sembilang	2008	Batam-Kuala Tungkal	560
Tenggiri	1972	Tidak diketahui	267
Gambolo	2011	Padang-Mentawai	560
Ambu Ambu	2004	Padang-Mentawai	571
Kuala Bate II	1991	Palembang-Muntok	464
Madani	1999	(Sedang dijadwalkan mengisi rute Palembang-Muntok)	1106
Portlink	1979	Merak-Bakauheni	12,674
Portlink III	1986	Merak-Bakauheni	15,341
Portlink V	2011	Merak-Bakauheni	5023
Jatra III	1985	Merak-Bakauheni	5071
Batumandi	2012	Merak-Bakauheni	5553
Sebuku	2012	Merak-Bakauheni	5553
Legundi	2012	Merak-Bakauheni	5556
Ferrindo 5	1987	Patimban-Pontianak	3605
Kalibodri	2008	Kendal-Kumai	2129
Siginjai	2010	Jepara-Karimunjawa	616
Drajat Paciran	2015	Paciran-Bahaur Hulu	2940
Tongkol	1970	Ujung-Kamal	259
Jatra II	1980	Jangkar-Lembar	3902
Prathita IV	1968	Ketapang-Gilimanuk	507
Portlink II	2010	Lembar-Padangbai	649
Roditha	1973	Lembar-Padangbai	1236
Portlink VII	1996	The ship was suspended because it was under repair	2120
Jatra II	1980	Lembar-Jangkar	3902
Raja Enggano	2001	Poto Tano-Kayangan	783
Belida	2002	Poto Tano-Kayangan	844
Cucut	1990	Labuan Bajo-Sape	530
Cakalang	2004	Labuan Bajo-Sape	1483
Komodo	1982	Wisata	265
Jatra I	1980	The ship was suspended because it was under repair	3871
Ranaka	2011	Kupang-Hansisi	1029
Inerie II	2012	Kupang-Rote	1031
Ile Labalekan	2013	Kupang-Larantuka	895
Uma Kalada	1997	Kupang-Sabu-Raijua-Waingapu	881
Ile Mandiri	1990	Kalabahi-Bakalang-Baranusa-Adonara- Lewoleba	553
Bili	1990	Tebas Kuala-Perigi Piai	247
Kerapu III	1987	Batulicin-Tanjung Serdang	315
Gutila	1997	Batulicin-Tanjung Serdang	495
Goropa	1992	Kariangau-Penajam	547
Dingkis	1992	Kariangau-Penajam	404
Gajah Mada	1974	Kariangau-Penajam	512
Poncan Moale	1990	Kariangau-Penajam	621
Ranaka	2011	(Sedang dijadwalkan mengisi rute Bitung-Tobelo menggantikan Madani)	1029
Bawal	2005	Bitung-Mangaran	560
Labuhan Haji	2009	Bitung-Tobelo	753
Dalente Woba	2014	Bitung-Ternate	1120
Portlink VIII	2014	Bitung-Ternate	2125
Tarusi	2010	Likupang-Pananaru-Melonguane	596
Porodisa	2003	Amurang-Pananaru-Marore-Kawaluso	970
Tanjung Api	2009	Luwuk-Saiyong-Banggai	616
Dolosi	2007	Kolonodale-Baturube	560
Cengkih Afo	1991	Ampana-Pasokan-Dolong-Marisa	549
Tuna Tomini	2004	Ampana-Wakai-Gorontalo-Toboli	546
Moinit	2012	Pagimana-Gorontalo	1068
Teluk Tolo	2011	Luwuk-Banggai-Boniton-Kaukes-Bobong	540
Merak	1970	Siwa-Lasusua	692
Arwana	2002	Maccini Baji-Pulau Sabutung	282
Bontoharu	1999	Bira-Sikeli-Kasipute	1124
Sangke Palangga	2005	Bira-Jampea-Labuan Bajo-Marapokot	560
Bahteramas II	2014	Kamaru-Wanci	711
Kambaniru	1991	Wakorumba-Amolengu	

ASDP Indonesia Ferry operates large roll-on/roll-off ferries on crossings of the Lombok Strait, including the Padang Bai–Lembar route between Bali and Lombok.

== See also ==
- PELNI
- Port of Merak
- Port of Bakeu
- Transportation in Indonesia
