= List of districts of East Java =

The province of East Java in Indonesia is divided into 29 kabupaten (or regencies) and 9 kotamadya (or cities); these in turn are divided administratively into districts, known as kecamatan, of which there were 666 in 2020. These comprise 8,501 administrative villages (kelurahan in urban areas and desa in rural areas).

The districts of East Java, with the regency or city each falls into, are as follows:

== A-E ==
- Ajung, Jember
- Ambulu, Jember
- Ambunten, Sumenep
- Ampelgading, Malang
- Arjasa, Jember
- Arjasa, Situbondo
- Arjasa, Sumenep
- Arjosari, Pacitan
- Arosbaya, Bangkalan
- Asembagus, Situbondo
- Asemrowo, Surabaya
- Babadan, Ponorogo
- Babat, Lamongan
- Badas
- Badegan, Ponorogo
- Bagor, Nganjuk
- Bakung, Blitar
- Balen, Bojonegoro
- Balerejo, Madiun
- Balong, Ponorogo
- Balongbendo, Sidoarjo
- Balongpanggang, Gresik
- Balung, Jember
- Bancar, Tuban
- Bandar Kedungmulyo, Jombang
- Bandar, Pacitan
- Bandung, Tulungagung
- Bangil, Pasuruan
- Bangilan, Tuban
- Bangkalan, Bangkalan
- Bangorejo, Banyuwangi
- Bangsal, Mojokerto
- Bangsalsari, Jember
- Bantaran, Probolinggo
- Bantur, Malang
- Banyakan, Kediri
- Banyuanyar, Probolinggo
- Banyuates, Sampang
- Banyugluglur, Situbondo
- Banyuputih, Situbondo
- Banyuwangi, Banyuwangi
- Barat, Magetan
- Bareng, Jombang
- Baron, Nganjuk
- Batang Batang, Sumenep
- Batu Marmar, Pamekasan
- Batu, Batu
- Batuan, Sumenep
- Batuputih, Sumenep
- Baureno, Bojonegoro
- Beji, Pasuruan
- Bendo, Magetan
- Bendungan, Trenggalek
- Benjeng, Gresik
- Benowo, Surabaya
- Berbek, Nganjuk
- Besuk, Probolinggo
- Besuki, Situbondo
- Besuki, Tulungagung
- Binakal, Bondowoso
- Binangun, Blitar
- Blega, Bangkalan
- Blimbing, Malang
- Bluluk, Lamongan
- Bluto, Sumenep
- Bojonegoro, Bojonegoro
- Bondowoso, Bondowoso
- Boyolangu, Tulungagung
- Bringin, Ngawi
- Brondong, Lamongan
- Bubulan, Bojonegoro
- Bubutan, Surabaya
- Buduran, Sidoarjo
- Bugulkidul, Pasuruan
- Bulak, Surabaya
- Bululawang, Malang
- Bumiaji, Batu
- Bungah, Gresik
- Bungatan, Situbondo
- Bungkal, Ponorogo
- Burneh, Bangkalan
- Camplong, Sampang
- Campurdarat, Tulungagung
- Candi, Sidoarjo
- Candipuro, Lumajang
- Cerme, Gresik
- Cermee, Bondowoso
- Cluring, Banyuwangi
- Curahdami, Bondowoso
- Dagangan, Madiun
- Dampit, Malang
- Dander, Bojonegoro
- Dasuk, Sumenep
- Dau, Malang
- Dawarblandong, Mojokerto
- Deket, Lamongan
- Diwek, Jombang
- Dlanggu, Mojokerto
- Doko, Blitar
- Dolopo, Madiun
- Dongko, Trenggalek
- Donomulyo, Malang
- Dringu, Probolinggo
- Driyorejo, Gresik
- Duduk Sampeyan, Gresik
- Dukuh Pakis, Surabaya
- Dukun, Gresik
- Dungkek, Sumenep
- Durenan, Trenggalek

== F-J ==
- Gading, Probolinggo
- Gadingrejo, Pasuruan
- Galis, Bangkalan
- Galis, Pamekasan
- Gambiran, Banyuwangi
- Gampengrejo, Kediri
- Ganding, Sumenep
- Gandusari, Blitar
- Gandusari, Trenggalek
- Gapura, Sumenep
- Garum, Blitar
- Gayam, Sumenep
- Gayungan, Surabaya
- Gedangan, Malang
- Gedangan, Sidoarjo
- Gedeg, Mojokerto
- Geger, Bangkalan
- Geger, Madiun
- Gemarang, Madiun
- Gempol, Pasuruan
- Gending, Probolinggo
- Geneng, Ngawi
- Genteng, Banyuwangi
- Genteng, Surabaya
- Gerih, Ngawi
- Giligenteng, Sumenep
- Giri, Banyuwangi
- Glagah, Banyuwangi
- Glagah, Lamongan
- Glenmore, Banyuwangi
- Gondang Wetan, Pasuruan
- Gondang, Bojonegoro
- Gondang, Mojokerto
- Gondang, Nganjuk
- Gondang, Tulungagung
- Gondanglegi, Malang
- Grabagan, Tuban
- Grati, Pasuruan
- Gresik, Gresik
- Grogol, Kediri
- Grujugan, Bondowoso
- Gubeng, Surabaya
- Gucialit, Lumajang
- Gudo, Jombang
- Guluk-Guluk, Sumenep
- Gumukmas, Jember
- Gununganyar, Surabaya
- Gurah, Kediri
- Jabon, Sidoarjo
- Jabung, Malang
- Jambangan, Surabaya
- Jambon, Ponorogo
- Jangkar, Situbondo
- Jatibanteng, Situbondo
- Jatikalen, Nganjuk
- Jatirejo, Mojokerto
- Jatirogo, Tuban
- Jatiroto, Lumajang
- Jelbuk, Jember
- Jenangan, Ponorogo
- Jenggawah, Jember
- Jenu, Tuban
- Jetis, Mojokerto
- Jetis, Ponorogo
- Jiwan, Madiun
- Jogorogo, Ngawi
- Jogoroto, Jombang
- Jombang, Jember
- Jombang, Jombang
- Jrengik, Sampang
- Junrejo, Batu

== K-O ==
- Kabat, Banyuwangi
- Kabuh, Jombang
- Kademangan, Blitar
- Kademangan, Probolinggo
- Kadur, Pamekasan
- Kalianget, Sumenep
- Kalibaru, Banyuwangi
- Kalidawir, Tulungagung
- Kalipare, Malang
- Kalipuro, Banyuwangi
- Kalisat, Jember
- Kalitengah, Lamongan
- Kalitidu, Bojonegoro
- Kaliwates, Jember
- Kamal, Bangkalan
- Kampak, Trenggalek
- Kandangan, Kediri
- Kandat, Kediri
- Kangean, Sumenep
- Kanigaran, Probolinggo
- Kanigoro, Blitar
- Kanor, Bojonegoro
- Kapas, Bojonegoro
- Kapongan, Situbondo
- Karangan, Trenggalek
- Karanganyar, Ngawi
- Karangbinangun, Lamongan
- Karanggeneng, Lamongan
- Karangjati, Ngawi
- Karangpilang, Surabaya
- Karangploso, Malang
- Karangrejo, Magetan
- Karangrejo, Tulungagung
- Karas, Magetan
- Kare, Madiun
- Kartoharjo, Madiun
- Kartoharjo, Magetan
- Kasembon, Malang
- Kasiman, Bojonegoro
- Kasreman, Ngawi
- Kauman, Ponorogo
- Kauman, Tulungagung
- Kawedanan, Magetan
- Kebomas, Gresik
- Kebonagung, Pacitan
- Kebonsari, Madiun
- Kedamean, Gresik
- Kedewan, Bojonegoro
- Kediri, Kediri
- Kedopok, Probolinggo
- Kedungadem, Bojonegoro
- Kedungdung, Sampang
- Kedunggalar, Ngawi
- Kedungjajang, Lumajang
- Kedungkandang, Malang
- Kedungpring, Lamongan
- Kedungwaru, Tulungagung
- Kejayan, Pasuruan
- Kembangbahu, Lamongan
- Kemlagi, Mojokerto
- Kencong, Jember
- Kendal, Ngawi
- Kendit, Situbondo
- Kendungan, Ngawi
- Kenduruan, Tuban
- Kenjeran, Surabaya
- Kepanjen, Malang
- Kepanjenkidul, Blitar
- Kepohbaru, Bojonegoro
- Kepung, Kediri
- Kerek, Tuban
- Kertosono, Nganjuk
- Kesamben, Blitar
- Kesamben, Jombang
- Ketapang, Sampang
- Klabang, Bondowoso
- Klakah, Lumajang
- Klampis, Bangkalan
- Klojen, Malang
- Kokop, Bangkalan
- Konang, Bangkalan
- Kota Sumenep, Sumenep
- Kotaanyar, Probolinggo
- Kraksaan, Probolinggo
- Kras, Kediri
- Kraton, Pasuruan
- Krejengan, Probolinggo
- Krembangan, Surabaya
- Krembung, Sidoarjo
- Krian, Sidoarjo
- Kromengan, Malang
- Krucil, Probolinggo
- Kudu, Jombang
- Kunir, Lumajang
- Kunjang, Kediri
- Kuripan, Probolinggo
- Kutorejo, Mojokerto
- Kwadungan, Ngawi
- Kwanyar, Bangkalan
- Labang, Bangkalan
- Lakarsantri, Surabaya
- Lambeyan, Magetan
- Lamongan, Lamongan
- Larangan, Pamekasan
- Laren, Lamongan
- Lawang, Malang
- Leces, Probolinggo
- Ledokombo, Jember
- Lekok, Pasuruan
- Lembeyan, Magetan
- Lengkong, Nganjuk
- Lenteng, Sumenep
- Licin, Banyuwangi
- Loceret, Nganjuk
- Lowokwaru, Malang
- Lumajang, Lumajang
- Lumbang, Pasuruan
- Lumbang, Probolinggo
- Madiun, Madiun
- Maduran, Lamongan
- Maesan, Bondowoso
- Magersari, Mojokerto
- Magetan, Magetan
- Malo, Bojonegoro
- Manding, Sumenep
- Mangaran, Situbondo
- Manguharjo, Madiun
- Mantingan, Ngawi
- Mantup, Lamongan
- Manyar, Gresik
- Maospati, Magetan
- Margomulyo, Bojonegoro
- Maron, Probolinggo
- Masalembu, Sumenep
- Mayang, Jember
- Mayangan, Probolinggo
- Megaluh, Jombang
- Mejayan, Madiun
- Menganti, Gresik
- Merakurak, Tuban
- Mlandingan, Situbondo
- Mlarak, Ponorogo
- Modo, Lamongan
- Modung, Bangkalan
- Mojo, Kediri
- Mojoagung, Jombang
- Mojoanyar, Mojokerto
- Mojoroto, Kediri
- Mojosari, Mojokerto
- Mojowarno, Jombang
- Montong, Tuban
- Mulyorejo, Surabaya
- Mumbulsari, Jember
- Muncar, Banyuwangi
- Munjungan, Trenggalek
- Nawangan, Pacitan
- Ngadiluwih, Kediri
- Ngadirojo, Pacitan
- Ngajum, Malang
- Ngambon, Bojonegoro
- Ngancar, Kediri
- Nganjuk, Nganjuk
- Ngantang, Malang
- Ngantru, Tulungagung
- Ngariboyo, Magetan
- Ngasem, Bojonegoro
- Ngawi, Ngawi
- Ngebel, Ponorogo
- Ngetos, Nganjuk
- Ngimbang, Lamongan
- Nglegok, Blitar
- Ngluyu, Nganjuk
- Ngoro, Jombang
- Ngoro, Mojokerto
- Ngraho, Bojonegoro
- Ngrambe, Ngawi
- Ngrayun, Ponorogo
- Ngronggot, Nganjuk
- Nguling, Pasuruan
- Nguntoronadi, Magetan
- Ngunut, Tulungagung
- Ngusikan, Jombang
- Nonggunong, Sumenep
- Omben, Sampang

== P-R ==
- Pabean Cantikan, Surabaya
- Pace, Nganjuk
- Pacet, Mojokerto
- Paciran, Lamongan
- Pacitan, Pacitan
- Padang, Lumajang
- Padangan, Bojonegoro
- Padas, Ngawi
- Pademawu, Pamekasan
- Pagak, Malang
- Pagelaran, Malang
- Pagerwojo, Tulungagung
- Pagu, Kediri
- Paiton, Probolinggo
- Pajarakan, Probolinggo
- Pakal, Surabaya
- Pakel, Tulungagung
- Pakem, Bondowoso
- Pakis, Malang
- Pakisaji, Malang
- Pakong, Pamekasan
- Pakuniran, Probolinggo
- Pakusari, Jember
- Palang, Tuban
- Palengaan, Pamekasan
- Pamekasan, Pamekasan
- Panarukan, Situbondo
- Panceng, Gresik
- Pandaan, Pasuruan
- Panekan, Magetan
- Panggul, Trenggalek
- Panggungrejo, Blitar
- Pangkur, Ngawi
- Panji, Situbondo
- Panti, Jember
- Papar, Kediri
- Parang, Magetan
- Parengan, Tuban
- Paron, Ngawi
- Pasean, Pamekasan
- Pasirian, Lumajang
- Pasongsongan, Sumenep
- Pasrepan, Pasuruan
- Pasrujambe, Lumajang
- Patianrowo, Nganjuk
- Patrang, Jember
- Pegantenan, Pamekasan
- Perak, Jombang
- Pesanggaran, Banyuwangi
- Pesantren, Kediri
- Peterongan, Jombang
- Pilangkenceng, Madiun
- Pitu, Ngawi
- Plandaan, Jombang
- Plaosan, Magetan
- Plemahan, Kediri
- Ploso, Jombang
- Plosoklaten, Kediri
- Plumbang, Tuban
- Pogalan, Trenggalek
- Pohjentrek, Pasuruan
- Poncokusumo, Malang
- Poncol, Magetan
- Ponggok, Blitar
- Ponorogo, Ponorogo
- Porong, Sidoarjo
- Pragaan, Sumenep
- Prajekan, Bondowoso
- Prajurit Kulon, Mojokerto
- Prambon, Nganjuk
- Prambon, Sidoarjo
- Prigen, Pasuruan
- Pringkuku, Pacitan
- Pronojiwo, Lumajang
- Proppo, Pamekasan
- Pucanglaban, Tulungagung
- Pucuk, Lamongan
- Pudak, Ponorogo
- Puger, Jember
- Pujer, Bondowoso
- Pujon, Malang
- Pule, Trenggalek
- Pulung, Ponorogo
- Puncu, Kediri
- Pungging, Mojokerto
- Punung, Pacitan
- Puri, Mojokerto
- Purwoasri, Kediri
- Purwodadi, Pasuruan
- Purwoharjo, Banyuwangi
- Purworejo, Pasuruan
- Purwosari, Bojonegoro
- Purwosari, Pasuruan
- Puspo, Pasuruan
- Raas, Sumenep
- Rambipuji, Jember
- Randuagung, Lumajang
- Ranuyoso, Lumajang
- Rejoso, Nganjuk
- Rejoso, Pasuruan
- Rejotangan, Tulungagung
- Rembang, Pasuruan
- Rengel, Tuban
- Ringinrejo, Kediri
- Robatal, Sampang
- Rogojampi, Banyuwangi
- Rowokangkung, Lumajang
- Rubaru, Sumenep
- Rungkut, Surabaya

== S ==
- Sambeng, Lamongan
- Sambikerep, Surabaya
- Sambit, Ponorogo
- Sampang, Sampang
- Sampung, Ponorogo
- Sanankulon, Blitar
- Sananwetan, Blitar
- Sangkapura, Gresik
- Sapeken, Sumenep
- Saradan, Madiun
- Sarirejo, Lamongan
- Saronggi, Sumenep
- Sawahan, Madiun
- Sawahan, Nganjuk
- Sawahan, Surabaya
- Sawoo, Ponorogo
- Sedati, Sidoarjo
- Sekar, Bojonegoro
- Sekaran, Lamongan
- Selopuro, Blitar
- Selorejo, Blitar
- Semampir, Surabaya
- Semanding, Tuban
- Semboro, Jember
- Semen, Kediri
- Sempol, Bondowoso
- Sempu, Banyuwangi
- Sendang, Tulungagung
- Senduro, Lumajang
- Senori, Tuban
- Sepulu, Bangkalan
- Sidayu, Gresik
- Sidoarjo, Sidoarjo
- Siliragung, Banyuwangi
- Silo, Jember
- Siman, Ponorogo
- Simokerto, Surabaya
- Sine, Ngawi
- Singgahan, Tuban
- Singojuruh, Banyuwangi
- Singosari, Malang
- Situbondo, Situbondo
- Slahung, Ponorogo
- Socah, Bangkalan
- Soko, Tuban
- Sokobanah, Sampang
- Solokuro, Lamongan
- Songgon, Banyuwangi
- Sooko, Mojokerto
- Sooko, Ponorogo
- Srengat, Blitar
- Sreseh, Sampang
- Srono, Banyuwangi
- Suboh, Situbondo
- Sudimoro, Pacitan
- Sugihwaras, Bojonegoro
- Sugio, Lamongan
- Sukapura, Probolinggo
- Sukodadi, Lamongan
- Sukodono, Lumajang
- Sukodono, Sidoarjo
- Sukolilo, Surabaya
- Sukomanunggal, Surabaya
- Sukomoro, Magetan
- Sukomoro, Nganjuk
- Sukorambi, Jember
- Sukorame, Lamongan
- Sukorejo, Blitar
- Sukorejo, Pasuruan
- Sukorejo, Ponorogo
- Sukosari, Bondowoso
- Sukosewu, Bojonegoro
- Sukowono, Jember
- Sukun, Malang
- Sumber Malang, Situbondo
- Sumber, Probolinggo
- Sumberasih, Probolinggo
- Sumberbaru, Jember
- Sumberejo, Bojonegoro
- Sumbergempol, Tulungagung
- Sumberjambe, Jember
- Sumbermanjing Wetan, Malang
- Sumberpucung, Malang
- Sumbersari, Jember
- Sumbersoko, Lumajang
- Sumberwringin, Bondowoso
- Sumobito, Jombang
- Suruh, Trenggalek
- Sutojayan, Blitar

== T ==
- Tajinan, Malang
- Takeran, Magetan
- Talango, Sumenep
- Talun, Blitar
- Taman, Madiun
- Taman, Sidoarjo
- Tamanan, Bondowoso
- Tambak, Gresik
- Tambakboyo, Tuban
- Tambakrejo, Bojonegoro
- Tambaksari, Surabaya
- Tambelangan, Sampang
- Tanah Merah, Bangkalan
- Tandes, Surabaya
- Tanggul, Jember
- Tanggulangin, Sidoarjo
- Tanggung Gunung, Tulungagung
- Tanjunganom, Nganjuk
- Tanjungbumi, Bangkalan
- Tapen, Bondowoso
- Tarik, Sidoarjo
- Tarokan, Kediri
- Tegalampel, Bondowoso
- Tegaldlimo, Banyuwangi
- Tegalombo, Pacitan
- Tegalsari, Banyuwangi
- Tegalsari, Surabaya
- Tegalsiwalan, Probolinggo
- Tekung, Lumajang
- Temayang, Bojonegoro
- Tembelang, Jombang
- Tempeh, Lumajang
- Tempurejo, Jember
- Tempursari, Lumajang
- Tenggarang, Bondowoso
- Tenggilis Mejoyo, Surabaya
- Tikung, Lamongan
- Tiris, Probolinggo
- Tirtoyudo, Malang
- Tlanakan, Pamekasan
- Tlogosari, Bondowoso
- Tongas, Probolinggo
- Torjun, Sampang
- Tosari, Pasuruan
- Tragah, Bangkalan
- Trawas, Mojokerto
- Trenggalek, Trenggalek
- Trowulan, Mojokerto
- Trucuk, Bojonegoro
- Tuban, Tuban
- Tugu, Trenggalek
- Tulakan, Pacitan
- Tulangan, Sidoarjo
- Tulungagung, Tulungagung
- Tumpang, Malang
- Turen, Malang
- Turi, Lamongan
- Tutur, Pasuruan

== U-Z ==
- Udanawu, Blitar
- Ujung Pangkah, Gresik
- Umbulsari, Jember
- Wagir, Malang
- Wajak, Malang
- Walikukun, Ngawi
- Waru, Pamekasan
- Waru, Sidoarjo
- Wates, Blitar
- Wates, Kediri
- Watulimo, Trenggalek
- Widang, Tuban
- Widodaren, Ngawi
- Wilangan, Nganjuk
- Winongan, Pasuruan
- Wiyung, Surabaya
- Wlingi, Blitar
- Wongsorejo, Banyuwangi
- Wonoasih, Probolinggo
- Wonoasri, Madiun
- Wonoayu, Sidoarjo
- Wonocolo, Surabaya
- Wonodadi, Blitar
- Wonokromo, Surabaya
- Wonomerto, Probolinggo
- Wonorejo, Pasuruan
- Wonosalam, Jombang
- Wonosari, Bondowoso
- Wonosari, Malang
- Wonotirto, Blitar
- Wringin, Bondowoso
- Wringinanom, Gresik
- Wuluhan, Jember
- Wungu, Madiun
- Yosowilangun, Lumajang
