= Kapas, Bojonegoro =

Kapas
- District
- Location in Bojonegoro Regency
- Coordinates: 7.1995°S 111.8926°E
- Country: Indonesia
- Province: East Java
- Regency: Bojonegoro

Government
  - Camat: Sukirno, SSos, MSi

Area
  - Total: 46.38 km^{2} (17.91 sq mi)

Population (mid 2025 estimate)
  - Total: 58,080
  - Density: 1,252/km^{2} (3,243/sq mi)
- Time zone: UTC+7 Western Indonesian Time
- Postcode: 62181
- Area code: +62 353
- Website: http://kapas.bojonegorokab.go.id

Kapas is an administrative district (kecamatan) in Bojonegoro Regency, in East Java Province of Indonesia. It borders Soko District of Tuban Regency to the north, Balen District to the east, Sukosewu District to the south, and Bojonegoro District to the west. The village of Sukowati is the petroleum exploration site of Joint Operating Body Pertamina PetroChina East Java (JOB-PPEJ) as a part of Tuban Block.

== Administration ==
Kapas district is divided into 21 administrative villages (Indonesian: kelurahan, desa).

1. Bakalan; 2. Bangilan; 3. Bendo; 4. Bogo; 5. Kalianyar; 6. Kapas; 7. Kedaton	8. Klampok; 9. Kumpulrejo; 10. Mojodeso; 11. Ngampel; 12. Padang Mentoyo; 13. Plesungan; 14. Sambiroto	15. Sembung; 16. Semenpinggir; 17. Sukowati; 18. Tanjungharjo; 19. Tapelan; 20. Tikusan; 21. Wedi

== Transport ==
=== Roads ===
Indonesian National Route 20 runs from Babat to Caruban through Kapas.

=== Railways ===
Kapas is served by Kapas railway station which has once daily commuter service to Surabaya Pasar Turi, Surabaya Gubeng and Sidoarjo. More commuter and intercity rail services are provided at Bojonegoro railway station.
