= Kanor =

Kanor may refer to:

- Kanor (surname), people with the surname Kanor
- Kanor language, also variously rendered as the Kinnauri, Kunawaree, Kanauri, Kanawari, and Kunawari language
- Kanor, Bojonegoro, kecamatan of Bojonegoro Regency, in East Java
- Kanor, Rajasthan, town in Udaipur district of Rajasthan

== See also ==
- Mang Kanor, 2023 Philippine independent erotic film
