= Bowerno railway station =

Railway station in Indonesia

Bowerno Station Stasiun Bowerno
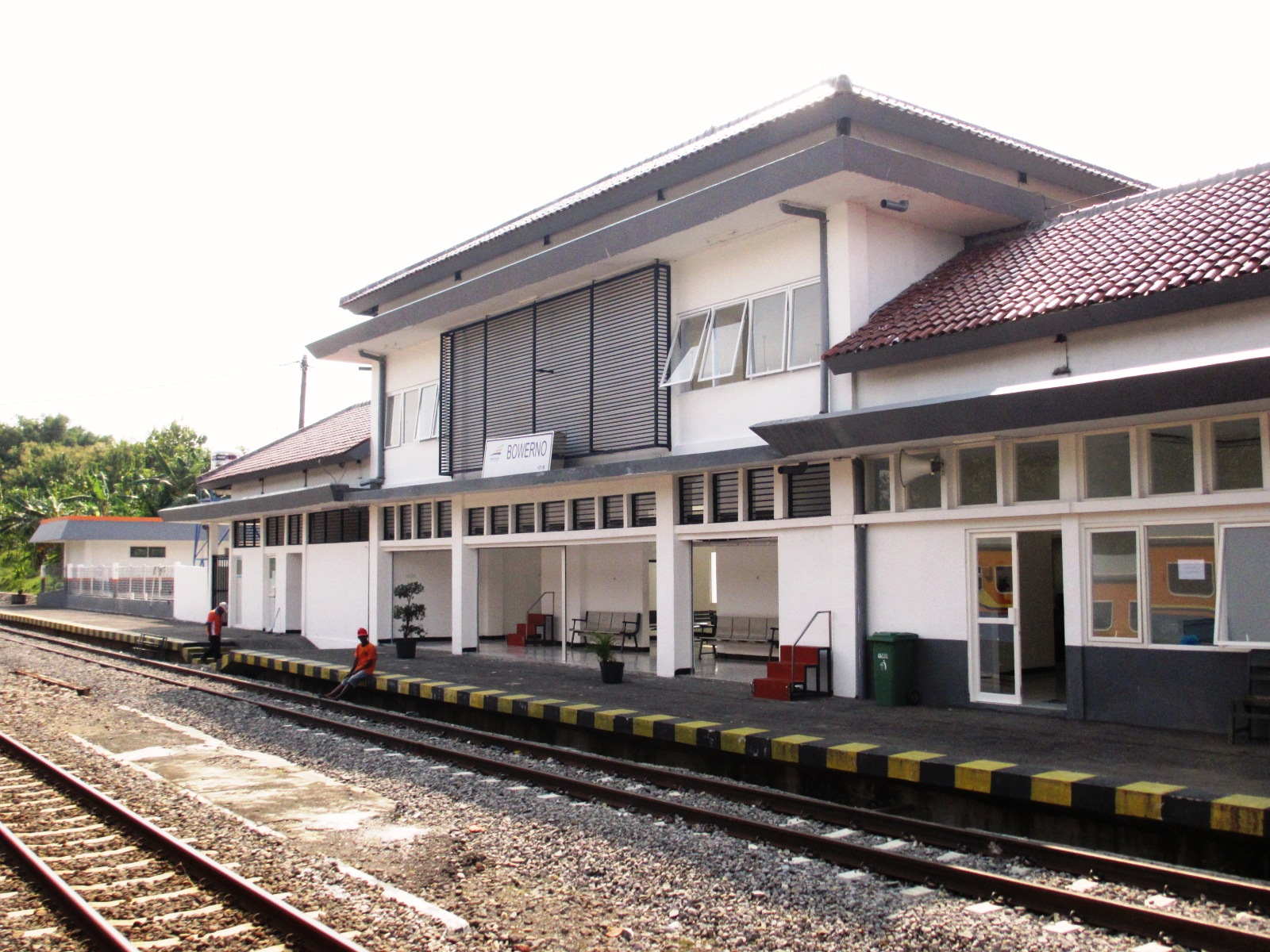
- Bowerno Station

General information
- Location: Baureno, Bojonegoro Regency; East Java; Indonesia
- Coordinates: 7.131124°S 112.099801°E
- Elevation: +21 m (69 ft)
- Owner: Kereta Api Indonesia
- Operator: Kereta Api Indonesia
- Line: Gambringan–Surabaya Pasar Turi
- Platforms: single side platform
- Tracks: 4

Construction
- Structure type: Ground
- Parking: Available
- Accessible: Available

Other information
- Station code: BWO
- Classification: Class III

Services
Preceding station		Following station
Sumberejo towards	Commuter Line Arjonegoro BJ-SDA	Babat towards
Sumberejo towards Cepu	Commuter Line Blorasura	Babat towards Surabaya Pasarturi
Location
- Location within Bojonegoro Regency

Bowerno Station is a railway station located in Baureno, Bojonegoro Regency, East Java. Bowerno is the older spelling of Baureno and still used as the name of the railway station.

== Services ==
The following is a list of train services at the Bowerno Station

=== Passenger services ===
- Local economy
  - Bojonegoro Local, Destination of Bojonegoro and Sidoarjo

Preceding station	Kereta Api Indonesia	Following station
Sroyo towards Gambringan	Gambringan–Surabaya Pasar Turi	Babat towards Surabaya Pasar Turi
