= 2024 Bojonegoro regency election =

Local election in Indonesia

- 27 November 2024
- Turnout: 78.5%
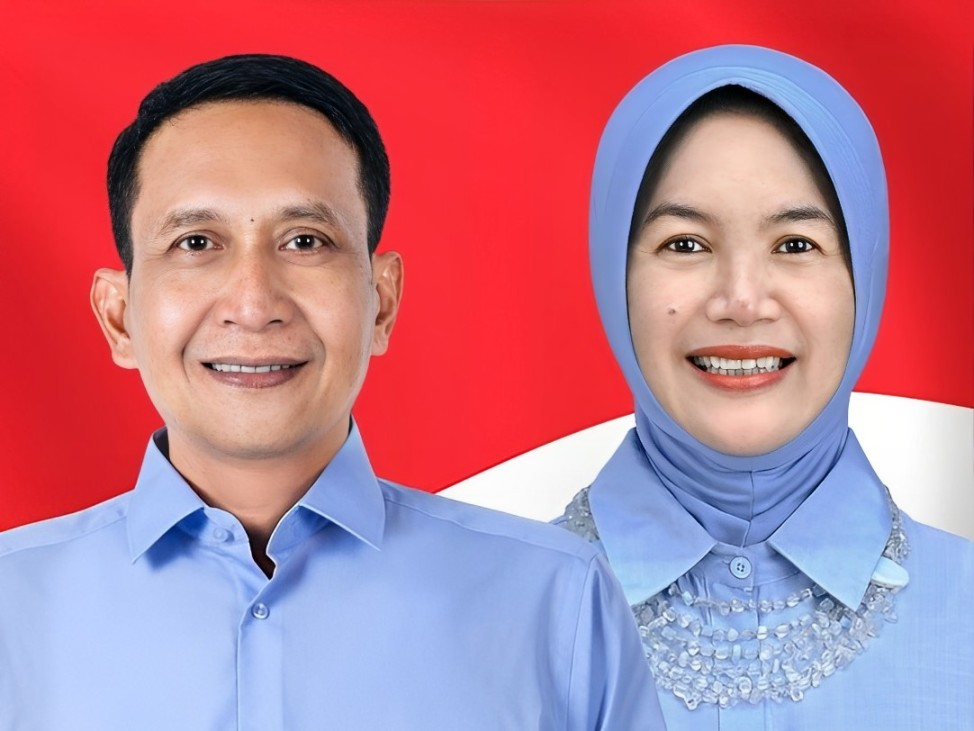

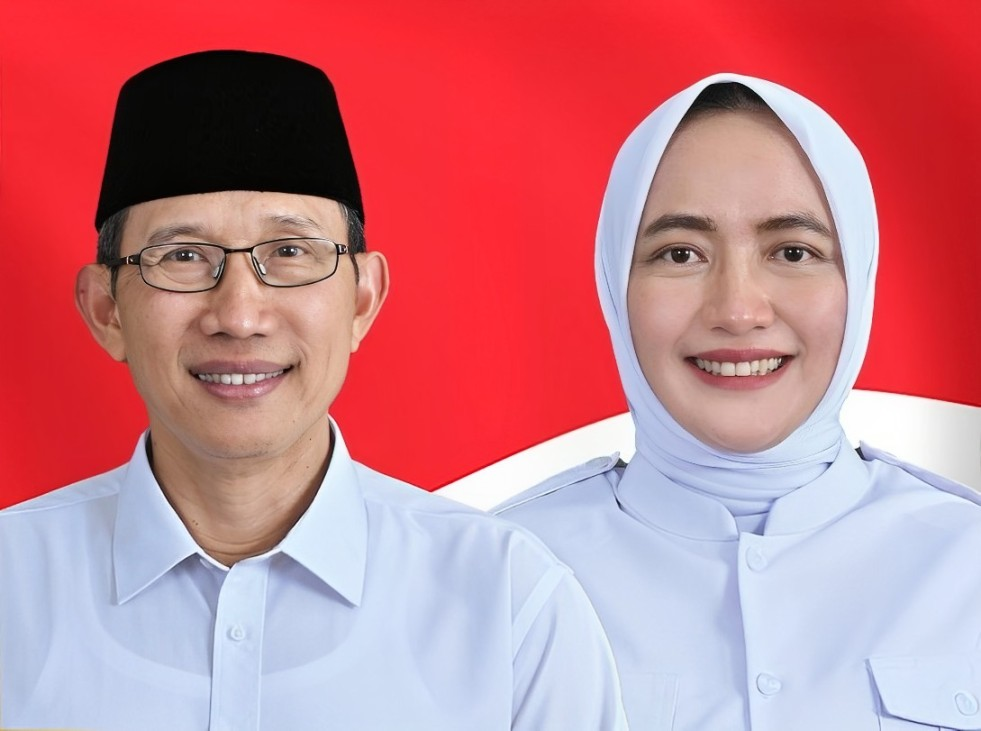
Candidate	Setyo Wahono	Teguh Haryono
Party	Gerindra	PDI-P
Running mate	Nurul Azizah	Farida Hidayati
Popular vote	701,249	83,709
Percentage	89.34%	10.66%
Regent before election
Adriyanto (acting)
Independent
Elected Regent
Setyo Wahono
Gerindra

The 2024 Bojonegoro regency election was held on 27 November 2024 as part of nationwide local elections to elect the regent of Bojonegoro Regency, East Java, for a five-year term. Previous regent Anna Mu'awanah did not contest the election, having been elected into the House of Representatives. In the election, Advanced Indonesia Coalition-backed candidate Setyo Wahono defeated PDI-P candidate Teguh Haryono in a landslide, winning nearly 90 percent of votes.

== Electoral system ==
The election, like other local elections in 2024, follow the first-past-the-post system where the candidate with the most votes wins the election, even if they do not win a majority. It is possible for a candidate to run uncontested, in which case the candidate is still required to win a majority of votes "against" an "empty box" option. Should the candidate fail to do so, the election will be repeated on a later date.

According to the Bojonegoro General Elections Commission (KPU), the total number of eligible voters is 1,026,363.

== Candidates ==
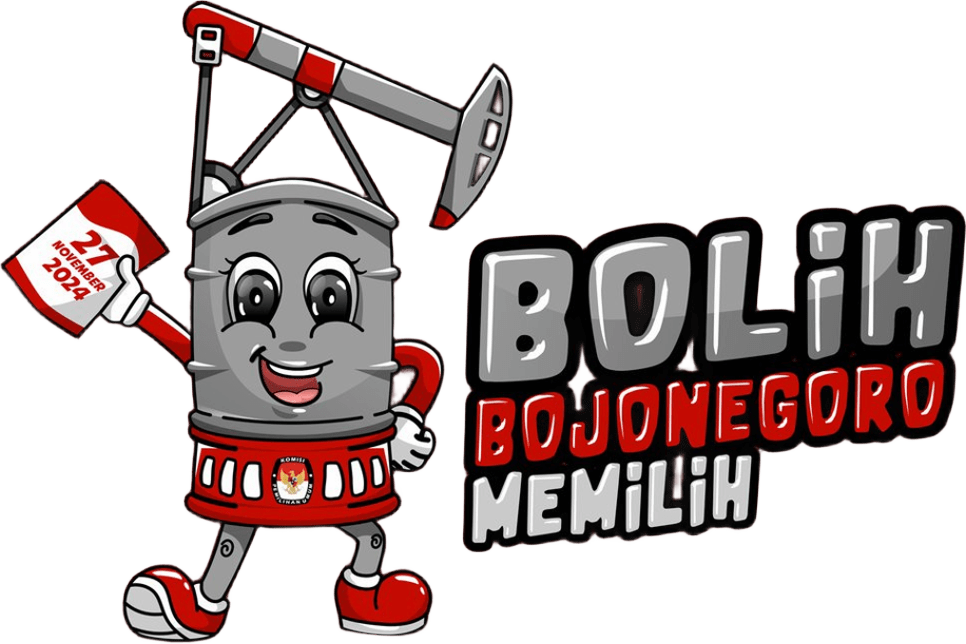
KPU-designed mascot for the election

According to electoral regulations, in order to qualify for the election, candidates were required to secure support from a political party or a coalition of parties controlling 20 percent of the seats in the Bojonegoro Regency Regional House of Representatives (DPRD), i.e. 10 seats, or at least 10 percent of votes in the 2024 Indonesian legislative election from Bojonegoro. Candidates without party endorsement may alternatively demonstrate support in form of photocopies of identity cards, which in Bojonegoro's case corresponds to 67,200 copies.

=== Setyo–Nurul ===
By July 2024, Gerindra had announced the party's backing for Bojonegoro-based businessman Setyo Wahono to run as regent. Wahono had previously been part of the presidential campaign teams of Joko Widodo in 2014 and 2019, and of Prabowo Subianto in 2024. Wahono then received endorsements from eight other parties represented in Bojonegoro's DPRD by 22 August. The National Awakening Party, which won the most votes in Bojonegoro in 2024, had initially endorsed previous regent Anna Mu'awanah to run for a second term, but at the last minute switched its support to Wahono, while Mu'awanah remained as member of the House of Representatives where she had been elected in 2024.

Wahono's running mate, Nurul Azizah, served as Bojonegoro's regional secretary until 2024. Azizah initially registered as an independent and managed to secure sufficient proofs of support, submitting 84 thousand copies of identity cards with 74,540 verified by election officials. However, she aborted her run to become Wahono's running mate.

=== Teguh–Farida ===
On the last day of registration (30 August), the Indonesian Democratic Party of Struggle announced that it would endorse its own party member, Bojonegoro-born engineering professional Teguh Haryono. His running mate, Farida Hidayati, had served one term in the House of Representatives as a PKB member before failing to win a second term in the 2024 legislative election. The ticket later also received the endorsement of the Perindo Party.

== Campaign ==
KPU arranged three rounds of public debates between the two candidate pairs. During the first debate, held on 19 October, a dispute arose due to Haryono's entry to the stage during a session reserved for the vice-regent candidates, resulting in the debate being cancelled early. Due to the dispute over rules, the second round of debates was postponed until 13 November, and the third round was held on 17 November.

== Results ==
Candidate	Running mate	Candidate party	Votes	%
Setyo Wahono	Nurul Azizah	Gerindra	701,249	89.34
Teguh Haryono	Farida Hidayati	PDI-P	83,709	10.66
Total			784,958	100.00
Valid votes			784,958	97.42
Invalid/blank votes			20,752	2.58
Total votes			805,710	100.00
Registered voters/turnout			1,026,363	78.50
Source: Bojonegoro KPU

== Aftermath ==
The election results were officially certified by KPU on 9 January 2025, with no lawsuits by the losing party. Wahono and Azizah were sworn in as regent and vice regent on 20 February 2025.
