= Modo =

Modo may refer to:

== Places ==
- Modo, Lamongan, a district in East Java, Indonesia
- Modo, Ongjin County, Incheon, South Korea
- Modo, Jindo County, South Jeolla, South Korea

== Other uses ==
- MoDo, Mo och Domsjö AB, a Swedish industrial corporation (now merged with Holmen)
- Modo Hockey, a Swedish ice hockey club
- MODO, Magic: The Gathering Online, an online version of the collectible card game Magic: The Gathering
- MODO, the Museo del Objeto del Objeto is a design and communications museum in Mexico City founded it 2010
- modo (software), a polygon, subdivision surface, modeling and rendering package developed by Luxology, LLC
- Modo (wireless device), a wireless device developed by Scout electromedia
- Modo (car co-op), a carsharing co-op in Vancouver, BC, Canada
- Modo, a minor character in the Discworld novels
- Mo-Do (1966–2013), Italian Eurodance musician best known for the song "Eins, zwei, Polizei"
- Maureen Dowd (born 1952), New York Times columnist
- Michel Modo (1937–2008), French actor and humorist
- Modo, a protagonist from Biker Mice from Mars animated series
- MODO, the 4-letter banding code for Mourning Dove used by birders

== See also ==
- Modu, a defunct Israeli mobile phone company
