= Sumberrejo railway station =

Railway station in Indonesia

Sumberrejo Station Stasiun Sumberejo
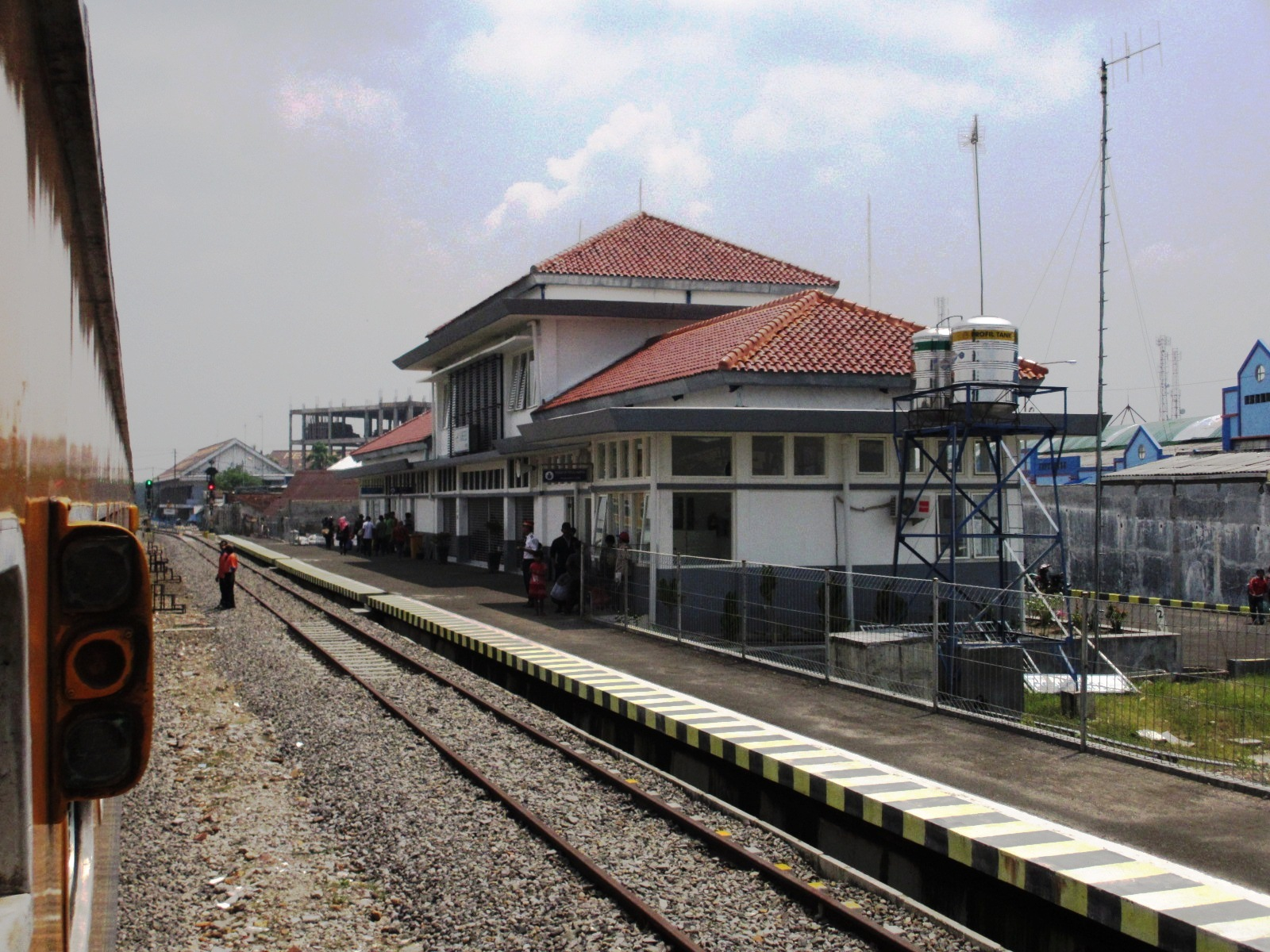
- Sumberrejo Station

General information
- Location: Sumberrejo, Bojonegoro Regency, East Java, Indonesia
- Coordinates: 7.177612°S 112.001515°E
- Elevation: +16 m (52 ft)
- Owner: Kereta Api Indonesia
- Operator: Kereta Api Indonesia
- Line: Gambringan–Surabaya Pasar Turi
- Platforms: single side platform
- Tracks: 4

Construction
- Structure type: Ground
- Parking: Available
- Accessible: Available

Other information
- Station code: SRJ
- Classification: Class III

Services
Preceding station		Following station
Kapas towards	Commuter Line Arjonegoro BJ-SDA	Bowerno towards
Kapas towards Cepu	Commuter Line Blorasura	Bowerno towards Surabaya Pasarturi
Location
- Location within Bojonegoro Regency

Sumberrejo Station is a railway station located in Sumberrejo, Bojonegoro Regency, East Java. The elevation of this station is +16 metres.

== Services ==
The following is a list of train services at the Sumberejo Station

=== Passenger services ===
- Local economy
  - Bojonegoro Local, Destination of Bojonegoro and Sidoarjo

Preceding station	Kereta Api Indonesia	Following station
Kapas towards Gambringan	Gambringan–Surabaya Pasar Turi	Sroyo towards Surabaya Pasar Turi
