= Titie Said =

Indonesian writer (1935–2011)

Titie Said was the pen name of Sitti Raya Kusumowardani (1935–2011), an Indonesian writer and journalist. She was especially known for her short stories and her many novels.

== Biography ==
She was born Sitti Raya in Bojonegoro, East Java, Dutch East Indies on 11 July 1935. Her mother was named Hastuti Suwanti and her father was called Muhammad Said; he had been a schoolteacher, soldier, and writer during the Dutch era. She was first educated in an elementary school in Bojonegoro starting in 1948. She then relocated to Malang to complete her secondary education. After 1959 she relocated to Jakarta to study in the Literature department at the University of Indonesia; however, she did not finish her degree.

In 1958, she became a journalist for a women's magazine. In the same year she married H. Sadikun Sugihwaras. She was editor of the magazine Kartini and chief editor of the magazine Famili. She served as chair of the Indonesian Film Censorship Board from 2003 to 2006 and from 2006 to 2009.

She wrote more than 25 novels, including Jangan Ambil Nyawaku (Don't take my life), Reinkarnasi (Reincarnation), Fatima, Ke Ujung Dunia (To the end of the world) and Prahara Cinta (Tempest of love). A number of her books have been made into films.

She died after having a stroke at the Medistra Hospital in Jakarta.
