= Kapas railway station =

Railway station in Indonesia

Kapas Station Stasiun Kapas B14 A27

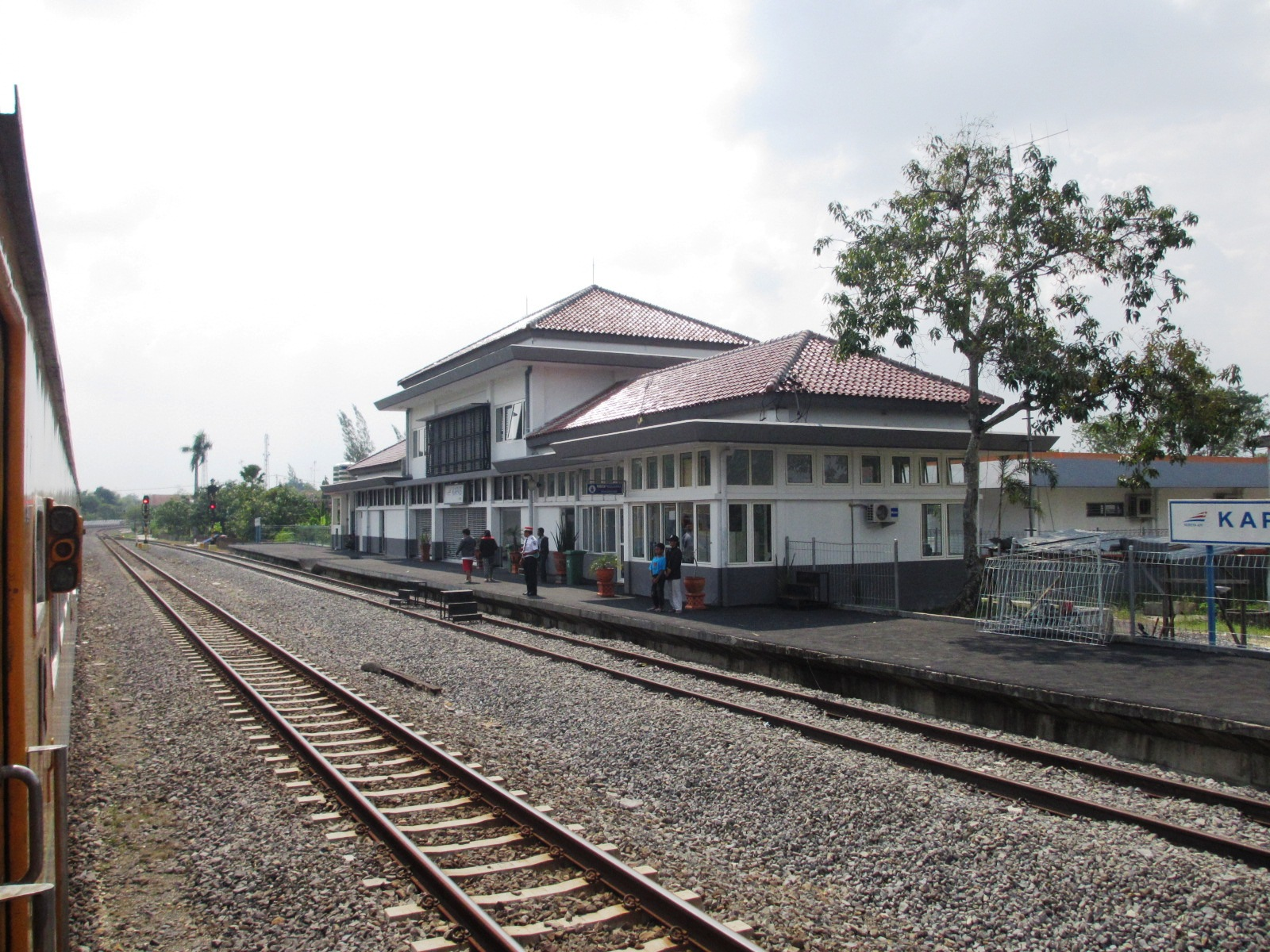
- Kapas Station

General information
- Location: Kapas, Bojonegoro Regency; East Java; Indonesia
- Coordinates: 7.1992487°S 111.9310239°E
- Elevation: +20 m (66 ft)
- Owner: Kereta Api Indonesia
- Operator: Kereta Api Indonesia
- Line: Gambringan–Surabaya Pasar Turi
- Platforms: single side platform
- Tracks: 4

Construction
- Structure type: Ground
- Parking: Available
- Accessible: Available

Other information
- Station code: KPS
- Classification: Class III

Services
Preceding station		Following station
Bojonegoro A28 Terminus	Commuter Line Arjonegoro	Sumberejo A26 towards Surabaya Pasarturi or Sidoarjo
Bojonegoro B15 towards Cepu	Commuter Line Blorasura	Sumberejo B13 towards Surabaya Pasarturi
Location
- Location within Bojonegoro Regency

Kapas Station is a railway station located in Kapas, Bojonegoro Regency, East Java. The elevation of this station is +20 metres amsl.

== Services ==
The following is a list of train services at the Kapas Station

=== Passenger services ===
- Local economy
  - Bojonegoro Local, Destination of Bojonegoro and Sidoarjo

Preceding station	Kereta Api Indonesia	Following station
Bojonegoro towards Gambringan	Gambringan–Surabaya Pasar Turi	Sumberrejo towards Surabaya Pasar Turi
