= Margomulyo, Bojonegoro =

District in Bojonegoro Regency, Indonesia

Margomulyo
- District
- Location in Bojonegoro Regency
- Coordinates: 7.3211°S 111.4872°E
- Country: Indonesia
- Province: East Java
- Regency: Bojonegoro

Government
  - Camat: Arief Nanang Sugianto, SSTP, MM

Area
  - Total: 139.68 km^{2} (53.93 sq mi)

Population (mid 2024 estimate)
  - Total: 23,413
  - Density: 167.62/km^{2} (434.13/sq mi)
- Time zone: UTC+7 Western Indonesian Time
- Postcode: 62168
- Area code: +62 353
- Website: http://margomulyo.bojonegorokab.go.id

Margomulyo is an administrative district (kecamatan) in Bojonegoro Regency, in East Java Province of Indonesia. It is located in the southwest of the regency and borders Ngraho District to the north, Tambakrejo District to the east, Ngawi Regency to the south, and Central Java Province to the west. The followers of Saminism Movement live in this district and are still practising their belief.

== Administration ==
Margomulyo is divided into 6 administrative villages (Indonesian: kelurahan, desa), listed below:

1. Geneng
2. Kalangan
3. Margomulyo
4. Meduri
5. Ngelo
6. Sumberjo

== Transport ==
=== Roads ===
Indonesian National Route 20 runs from Babat to Caruban through Margomulyo.
