= Gayam, Bojonegoro =

Gayam
- District
- Location in Bojonegoro Regency
- Coordinates: 7.1929°S 111.7197°E
- Country: Indonesia
- Province: East Java
- Regency: Bojonegoro

Government
  - Camat: Hartono, SSos, MM

Area
  - Total: 50.05 km^{2} (19.32 sq mi)

Population (mid 2025 estimate)
  - Total: 34,470
  - Density: 688.7/km^{2} (1,784/sq mi)
- Time zone: UTC+7 Western Indonesian Time
- Postcode: 62152 (Beged, Cengungklung, Katur, Manukan, Ngraho, Sudu) and 62154 (Begadon, Bonorejo, Gayam, Mojodelik, Ringintunggal)
- Area code: +62 353
- Website: http://gayam.bojonegorokab.go.id

Gayam is an administrative district (kecamatan) in Bojonegoro Regency, in East Java Province of Indonesia. It was created in 2012 from the merger of 12 villages that previously were parts of Ngasem and Kalitidu districts. Gayam became a new focus of attention as Banyu Urip oil field, the petroleum exploration site of ExxonMobil under the Cepu Block contract area, is located in this district.

== Administrative division ==
Gayam consists of 12 administrative villages (Indonesian: kelurahan, desa) listed below:

1. Beged; 2. Cengungklung; 3. Katur; 4. Manukan; 5. Ngraho; 6. Sudu	7. Begadon; 8. Bonorejo; 9. Brabowan; 10. Gayam; 11. Mojodelik; 12. Ringintunggal

== Transport ==
Indonesian National Route 20 runs from Babat to Caruban through Gayam. There is a flyover to provide access to the Banyu Urip site.
