= Lamongan Regency =

Regency in East Java, Indonesia

Lamongan Regency Kabupaten Lamongan
- Regency

Other transcription(s)
  - Javanese: Lamóngan (Gêdrig) لامَوڠان (Pégon) ꦭꦩꦺꦴꦔꦤ꧀ (Hånåcåråkå)
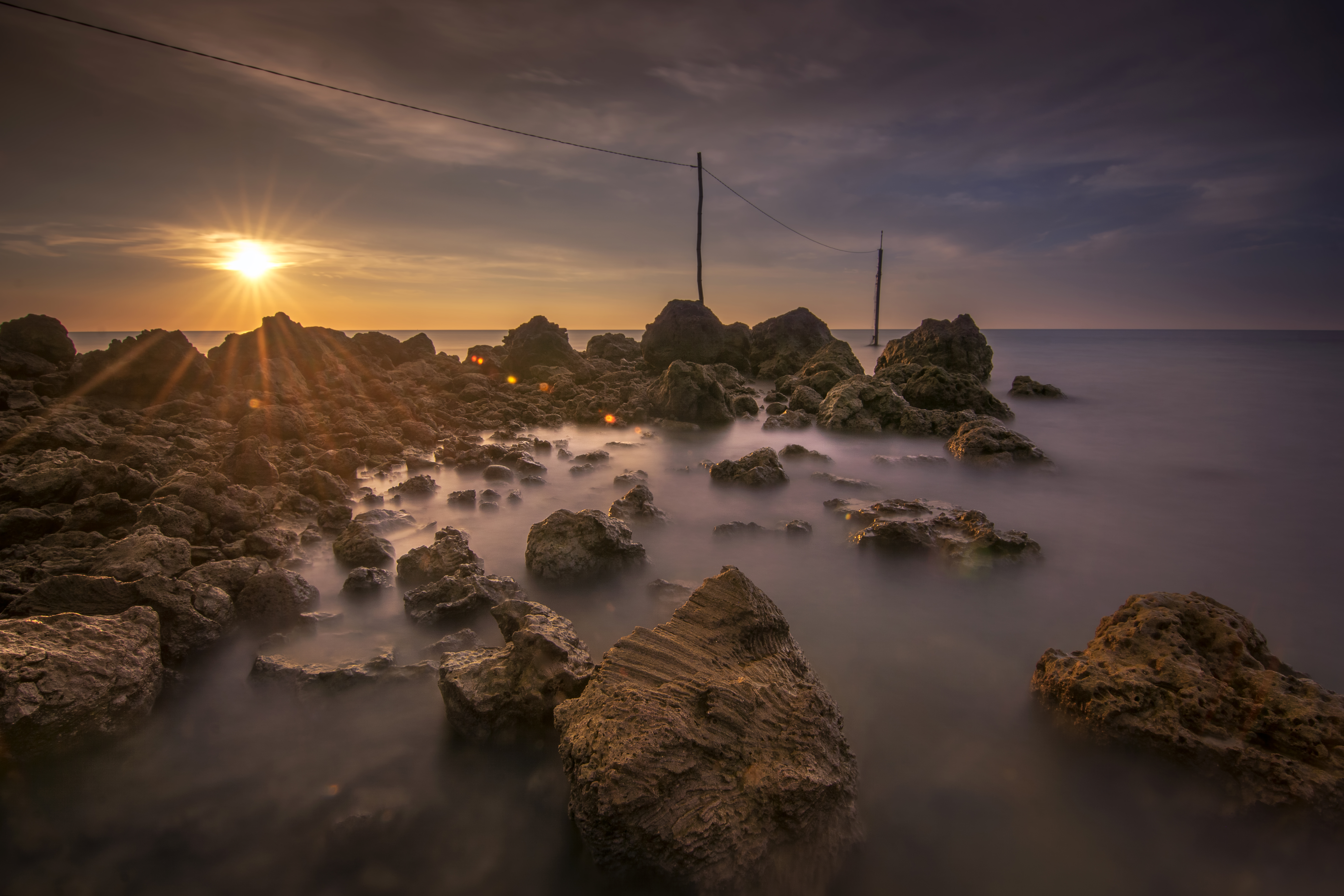
- Sunset at the village of Kandangsemangkon

- Coat of arms
- Motto(s): Memayu Raharjaning Praja (Persistent effort towards well-being of the people)
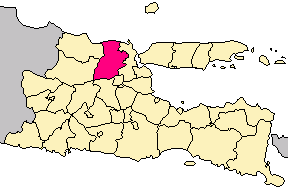
- Location within East Java

- Location in Java and Indonesia Lamongan Regency (Indonesia)
- Coordinates: 7°07′S 112°25′E
- Country: Indonesia
- Province: East Java
- Capital (city): Lamongan City

Government
  - Regent: Yuhronur Efendi
  - Vice Regent: Dirham Aksara

Area
  - Total: 1,812.80 km^{2} (699.93 sq mi)
- Elevation: 5 m (16 ft)

Population (mid 2025 estimate)
  - Total: 1,370,318
  - Density: 755.912/km^{2} (1,957.80/sq mi)
- Time zone: UTC+7 (IWST)
- Area code: (+62) 322
- Website: lamongankab.go.id

Lamongan Regency (Javanese: ꦭꦩꦺꦴꦔꦤ꧀) is a regency (kabupaten) of the East Java Province of Indonesia. It has a total land area of approximately 1,812.8 km^{2} (699.9 sq mi) or + 3.78% of the area of East Java Province. With a length of 47 km (29 mi) along the coastline (comprising Paciran and Brondong Districts), the sea area of Lamongan Regency is about 902.4 km^{2} (348.4 sq mi), if calculated to a distance of 12 miles (19 km) across the ocean surface. At the 2010 census it had a population of 1,179,059; the 2020 Census produced a total of 1,379,628 and the official estimate as of mid 2025 was 1,370,318 (comprising 684,425 males and 683,078 females in mid 2024). The regency seat is the town of Lamongan, situated on the Solo River which passes from west to east through the regency, effectively dividing it in two.

There are three main geographic divisions. In the far south of the regency (Sukorame, Bluluk, Ngimbang, Sambeng, Mantup and Modo Districts), and also in the northern coastal area (Brondong, Paciran and Solokuro Districts) are limestone mountains with land of medium fertility. Between the coastal uplands and the Solo River, much of the region consists of 'bonorowo' wetlands prone to periodic flooding (chiefly Glagah, Karangbinangun, Turi, Kalitengah, Karanggeneng, Laren, Maduran and Sekaran Districts). The remaining areas close to and south of the Solo River comprise lowlands of limited fertility (Kembangbahu, Sugio, Kedungpring, Babat, Pucuk, Sukadadi, Lamongan, Tikung, Sarirejo and Deket Districts).

Lamongan Regency is bordered by:

- Northern side : Java Sea
- Southern side : Mojokerto Regency and Jombang Regency
- Eastern side : Gresik Regency
- Western side : Tuban Regency and Bojonegoro Regency

The economy is mainly supported by agriculture, fishery, and commerce, especially the home industry.

== Administrative districts ==
Lamongan Regency consists of twenty-seven districts (kecamatan), tabulated below with their areas and population totals from the 2010 Census and the 2020 Census, together with the official estimates as of mid 2025. The table also includes the locations of the district administrative centres, the number of administrative villages in each district (totaling 462 rural desa and 12 urban kelurahan), and their postal codes.

| Kode Wilayah | Name of District (kecamatan) | Area in km^{2} | Pop'n Census 2010 | Pop'n Census 2020 | Pop'n Estimate mid 2025 | Admin centre | No. of villages | Post codes |
|---|---|---|---|---|---|---|---|---|
| 35.24.01 | Sukorame | 41.47 | 20,126 | 21,671 | 21,412 | Sukorame | 9 | 62276 |
| 35.24.02 | Bluluk | 54.15 | 21,429 | 23,106 | 22,929 | Bluluk | 9 | 62274 |
| 35.24.04 | Ngimbang | 114.33 | 43,678 | 49,008 | 49,143 | Sendangrejo | 19 | 62273 |
| 35.24.11 | Sambeng | 195.44 | 47,998 | 52,727 | 52,172 | Ardirejo | 22 | 62284 |
| 35.24.16 | Mantup | 93.07 | 42,750 | 46,795 | 46,599 | Mantup | 15 | 62283 |
| 35.24.19 | Kembangbahu | 63.84 | 46,032 | 50,154 | 50,324 | Kembangbahu | 18 | 62282 |
| 35.24.12 | Sugio | 91.29 | 54,478 | 63,069 | 62,960 | Sugio | 21 | 62256 |
| 35.24.06 | Kedungpring | 84.43 | 50,313 | 62,642 | 60,743 | Kedungpring | 23 | 62272 |
| 35.24.03 | Modo | 77.80 | 44,988 | 51,247 | 50,776 | Mojorejo | 17 | 62275 |
| 35.24.05 | Babat | 62.95 | 76,178 | 92,301 | 88,887 | Bedahan | 23 ^{(a)} | 62271 |
| 35.24.13 | Pucuk | 44.84 | 39,053 | 49,785 | 48,209 | Pucuk | 17 | 62257 |
| 35.24.17 | Sukodadi | 52.32 | 50,682 | 57,823 | 59,429 | Sukodadi | 20 | 62253 |
| 35.24.22 | Lamongan (town) | 40.38 | 65,083 | 69,517 | 71,083 | Lamongan | 20 ^{(b)} | 62211: 62218 |
| 35.24.23 | Tikung | 52.99 | 41,483 | 45,983 | 47,801 | Bakalanpule | 13 | 62280 |
| 35.24.27 | Sarirejo | 47.39 | 22,503 | 24,958 | 25,279 | Dermolemahbang | 9 | 62281` |
| 35.24.25 | Deket | 50.05 | 41,045 | 44,030 | 43,734 | Deketwetan | 17 | 62291 |
| 35.24.26 | Glagah | 40.52 | 35,014 | 41,539 | 40,584 | Glagah | 29 | 62292 |
| 35.24.24 | Karangbinangun | 52.88 | 33,285 | 40,445 | 40,607 | Sambopinggir | 21 | 62293 |
| 35.24.21 | Turi | 58.69 | 47,711 | 54,273 | 54,635 | Sukoanyar | 19 | 62252 |
| 35.24.20 | Kalitengah | 43.35 | 30,094 | 35,867 | 36,084 | Dibee | 20 | 62255 |
| 35.24.18 | Karanggeneng | 51.32 | 36,609 | 43,702 | 43,502 | Karanggeneng | 18 | 62254 |
| 35.24.09 | Sekaran | 49.65 | 33,443 | 48,091 | 42,581 | Bulutengger | 21 | 62260 |
| 35.24.10 | Maduran | 30.15 | 26,288 | 36,474 | 32,950 | Maduran | 17 | 62261 |
| 35.24.08 | Laren | 95.00 | 36,492 | 51,399 | 50,323 | Gampangsejati | 20 | 62262 |
| 35.24.15 | Solokuro | 101.02 | 39,530 | 48,057 | 49,173 | Payaman | 10 | 62265 |
| 35.24.14 | Paciran | 47.89 | 90,700 | 97,803 | 99,569 | Paciran | 17 ^{(c)} | 62264 |
| 35.24.07 | Brondong | 74.59 | 62,074 | 77,023 | 78,830 | Brondong | 10 ^{(d)} | 62263 |
| | Totals | 1,812.80 | 1,179,059 | 1,379,628 | 1,370,318 | Lamongan | 474 | |

Notes: (a) includes 2 kelurahan (Babat and Banaran). (b) comprises 8 kelurahan (Banjarmendalan, Jetis, Sidoharjo, Sidokumpul, Sukomulyo, Sukorejo, Tlogoanyar and Tumenggungan) and 12 desa.
(c) including one kelurahan (Blimbing). (d) including one kelurahan (Brondong).

== Climate ==
Lamongan has a tropical savanna climate (Aw) with moderate to little rainfall from May to November and heavy rainfall from December to April. The following climate data is for the town of Lamongan.

Climate data for Lamongan
| Month | Jan | Feb | Mar | Apr | May | Jun | Jul | Aug | Sep | Oct | Nov | Dec | Year |
|---|---|---|---|---|---|---|---|---|---|---|---|---|---|
| Mean daily maximum °C (°F) | 30.5 (86.9) | 30.5 (86.9) | 30.7 (87.3) | 31.4 (88.5) | 31.6 (88.9) | 31.5 (88.7) | 31.1 (88.0) | 31.9 (89.4) | 32.6 (90.7) | 33.2 (91.8) | 32.9 (91.2) | 31.3 (88.3) | 31.6 (88.9) |
| Daily mean °C (°F) | 26.9 (80.4) | 26.8 (80.2) | 26.9 (80.4) | 27.3 (81.1) | 27.3 (81.1) | 27.0 (80.6) | 26.4 (79.5) | 26.9 (80.4) | 27.5 (81.5) | 28.4 (83.1) | 28.3 (82.9) | 27.4 (81.3) | 27.3 (81.0) |
| Mean daily minimum °C (°F) | 23.4 (74.1) | 23.2 (73.8) | 23.2 (73.8) | 23.3 (73.9) | 23.1 (73.6) | 22.5 (72.5) | 21.8 (71.2) | 21.9 (71.4) | 22.4 (72.3) | 23.6 (74.5) | 23.8 (74.8) | 23.5 (74.3) | 23.0 (73.4) |
| Average rainfall mm (inches) | 280 (11.0) | 267 (10.5) | 272 (10.7) | 141 (5.6) | 107 (4.2) | 54 (2.1) | 33 (1.3) | 16 (0.6) | 13 (0.5) | 49 (1.9) | 118 (4.6) | 237 (9.3) | 1,587 (62.3) |
Source: Climate-Data.org

== Paciran Port ==
On 29 April 2013, Paciran Port (Class I ASDP) was officially opened to support the overloaded Tanjung Perak Port.

== Sport ==
Persela is a football team based in Lamongan. Former Persela Lamongan goalkeeper Choirul Huda was from Lamongan.
