= Setyo Wahono =

Indonesian politician (born 1972)

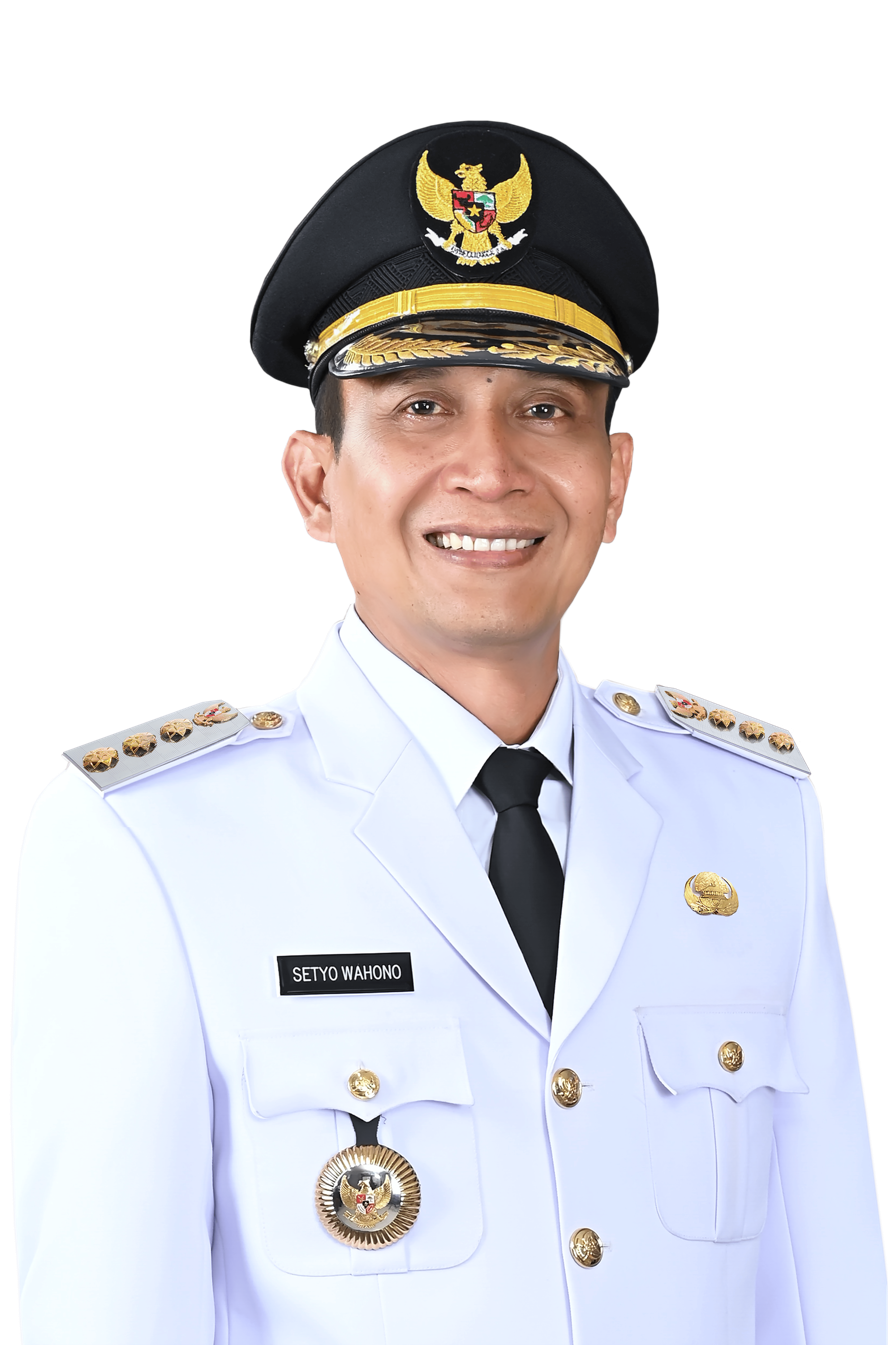

Regent of Bojonegoro
- Incumbent
- Assumed office 20 February 2025
- Preceded by: Adriyanto (act.); Anna Mu'awanah

Personal details
- Born: 8 May 1972 (age 53) Bojonegoro, East Java, Indonesia
- Party: Gerindra
- Relations: Pratikno (brother)

Setyo Wahono (born 8 May 1972) is an Indonesian politician of the Gerindra Party and business executive. He is currently serving as the regent of Bojonegoro Regency, East Java, having held the position since February 2025.

== Early life and education ==
Setyo Wahono was born on 8 May 1972 at the village of Dolokgede, in Bojonegoro Regency. His father was village chief there between 1976–1996, and his mother was a schoolteacher at the local elementary school. After completing middle school in Bojonegoro, he moved to Yogyakarta for high school, and then enrolled at the Indonesian Islamic University at Yogyakarta.

== Career ==
After graduating, Wahono worked for some time at Bank Danamon, and later joined the natural gas company Samator Indo Gas as a director for its Bojonegoro branch and deputy commissioner of its national holding company. He also opened a cafe in Bojonegoro.

Wahono had served within the General Elections Commission of Bojonegoro, and took part in the campaign teams of Joko Widodo and Prabowo Subianto in 2014, 2019, and 2024. In July 2024, Prabowo Subianto's Gerindra party announced its endorsement for Wahono to run in Bojonegoro's 2024 regency election. By August, Wahono had received further endorsements from eight other parties represented in Bojonegoro's DPRD, and he had officially joined Gerindra as a member by September. Running with Nurul Azizah as his running mate, Wahono defeated PDI-P candidate Teguh Haryono after winning 701,249 votes (89.34%). They were sworn in on 20 February 2025.

As regent, Wahono has announced that he would prioritize the development of the regency's agricultural sector, aiming to become East Java's second-largest rice producer.

== Personal life and family ==
He is married to Sri Budi Cantika Yuli, who lectured at Malang Muhammadiyah University, and the couple has two children: Arva Naufal Rachmanoka and Aswin Hadyan Rachmanoka. Wahono had taken part in the Indonesian Volleyball Federation's central committee.

Wahono's elder brother, Pratikno, served as the Indonesian State Secretary between 2014–2024 and Coordinating Minister for Human Development and Culture in the 2024–2029 term.
