= Kanor (surname) =

Kanor is a Ghanaian surname. Notable people with the surname include:

- Fabienne Kanor (born 1970), French journalist, novelist and filmmaker
- Laura Kanor (born 1997), French handball player
- Orlane Kanor (born 1997), French handball player, identical twin of Laura
