= Jogorogo =

District in Ngawi Regency, Indonesia

Jogorogo District
- district
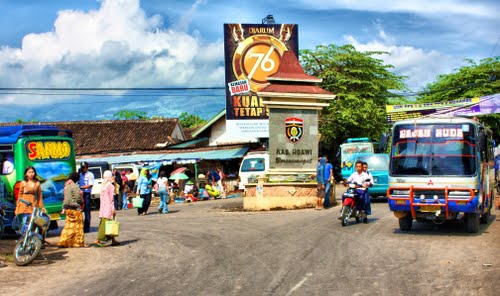
- Jogorogo's Intersection

- Location within Indonesia
- Coordinates: 7°31′17.9″S 111°15′07″E
- Country: Indonesia
- Province: East Java

Area
  - Total: 71.10 km^{2} (27.45 sq mi)
- Elevation: 457 m (1,499 ft)

Population (mid 2024 estimate)
  - Total: 45,150
  - Density: 635.0/km^{2} (1,645/sq mi)
- Time zone: GMT +7

Jogorogo is an administrative district (kecamatan) in Ngawi Regency, in East Java Province of Indonesia.

== Geography ==
Jogorogo is part of Mount Lawu main system, which lies in northwest part of its slope.

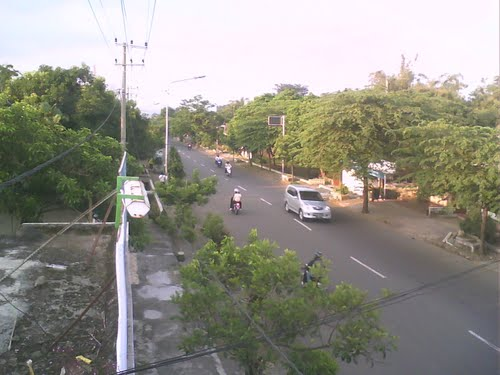
Jogorogo's Main Street

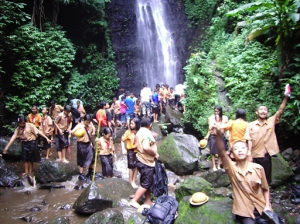
Students at Srambang Waterfall

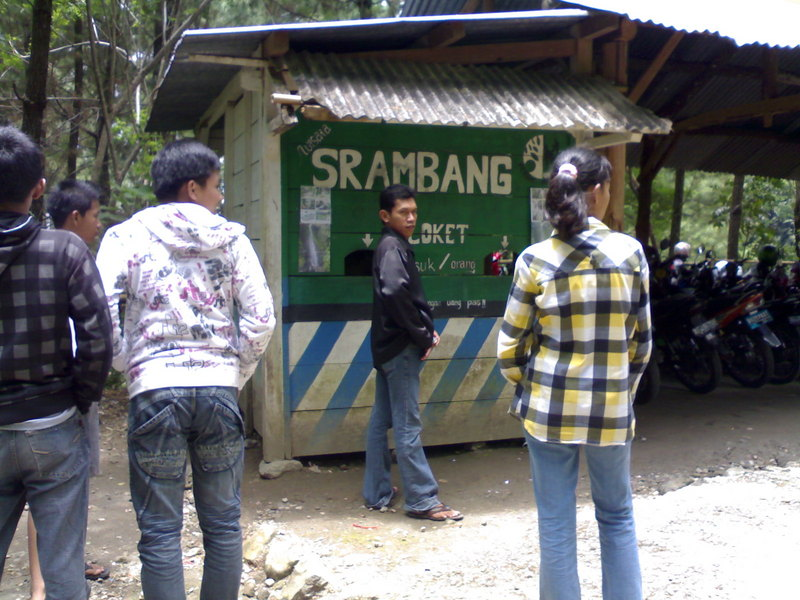
Srambang Waterfall Main Entrance

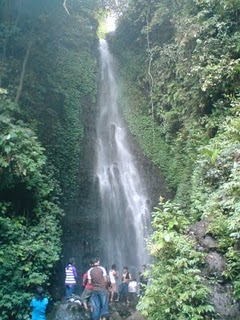
Srambang Waterfall

== See also ==
- Districts of Indonesia
- List of regencies and cities of Indonesia
