= Saminism Movement =

Indonesian nationalist movement

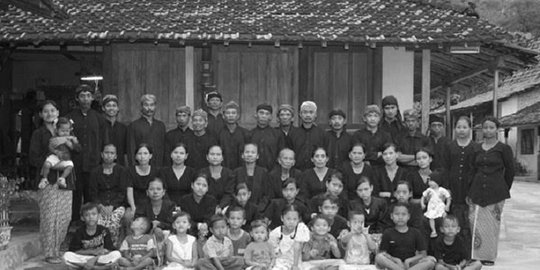

The Surontiko Samin's challenge is an Indonesian spirituality and social movement founded by Surontiko Samin in north-central Java, Indonesia in the late 19th and early 20th centuries. Saminism rejected the capitalist views of the colonial Dutch, who predominately forced taxes upon the people of Indonesia, including the poor, and monopolized their free public forest lands; particularly land which contains precious teak forests used for trade. Samin people do not belong to the Muslim faith, and they do not practice many of the Islamic rituals such as fasting or praying. However they do focus on the spiritual aspect of all mainstream religions as well as good values, such as modesty, honesty, and simplicity.

Because Surontiko Samin was illiterate, and also his followers and other Saminist leaders, there are no written first-hand accounts of the Saminist movement. This has posed a problem for historians and social scientist because of the lack of written records from the Saminists themselves.

It is perhaps no exaggeration to say that the movement founded by Surontiko Samin, a Javanese peasant, is one of the longest-living social phenomena in modern Javanese history. It antedated by about two decades the general awakening of organizational activity which Indonesians have come to call their Kebangkitan Nasional despite an early eclipse, it managed to survive in its original locale (though barely ever spreading to adjacent areas for longer periods of time) throughout the colonial period. At its peak, when it probably counted some three thousand households, it disturbed the colonial bureaucracy with forebodings of massive peasant resistance, producing a flurry of attention out of all proportion (as some few contemporaries realized) to the occasion; subsequently it dropped from view, provoking no more than a few lines in the annual surveys published by the Dutch authorities, yet already capturing the imagination of some Indonesian intellectuals who came to view it as a manifestation of indigenous socialism, peasant virtue, and patriotic resistance to colonialism. Saminism, in fact, has survived into the era of Indonesian independence. The sheer stubbornness, with which some Javanese in a rather remote part of the island have clung to the ideas of their long-dead founder, deserves careful attention. And the fact that it did not cease when colonial rule ended, the fact that civil servants serving the Indonesian Republic appear to be almost as perplexed by Saminism as were their Dutch predecessors also indicates that it cannot be simply subsumed under the broader heading of nationalism. Recent political developments of a far more radical-political form in the heartland of Saminism appear to us to have been distinctive and by no means directly related to Saminism.

== Origins ==
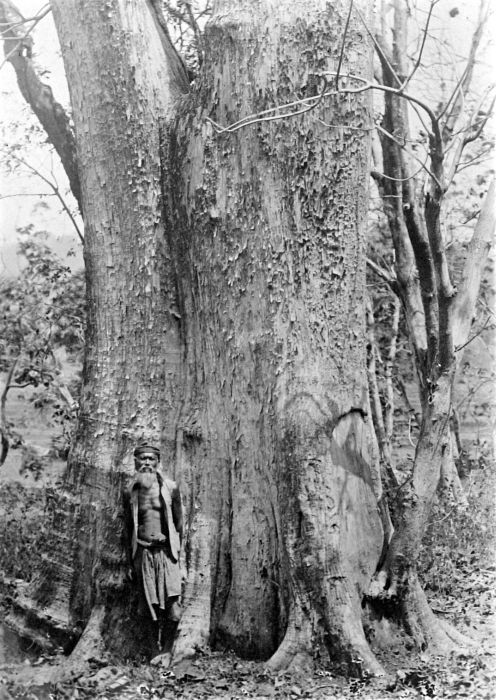
Example of a teak tree during the same time period in Java, Indonesia 1900-1940

In the late 19th century the colonial Dutch had taken over much of Indonesia. The Dutch sought after the natural resources which were abundant in the land. These resources included spice lands and many forests. One forest in particular was the teak forest which lay in near the village Bojonegoro in north-central Java. This forest was communal land which provided resource to the native people who otherwise had nothing. This area contained the highest percentage of teak forest land in Java. Dutch officials declared it Dutch colonial property and denied access to the forest for local people. In the 1890s after much struggle between the Dutch and the local people, Surontiko Samin, a peasant farmer in the area, started preaching pacifist resistance toward the Dutch colonial authorities. Rather than revolting against the Dutch, Samin encouraged peaceful resistance in the form of not paying taxes and continuing to take teak out of the forests for their own use. "This was an era of a growing administrative supervision and centralization of the government on all political and social levels, even the remotest villages. Tax assessors, agricultural agents, and a host of other public servants descended upon the village society, which was thus drawn almost perforce within a Western orbit."

The word Samin comes from the Javanese word Sami, which means the same.

== Biography of Surontiko Samin ==
Surontiko Samin was born in 1859 in the village Ploso Kediren, Randublatung in Blora, central Java, Indonesia. Originally he was named Raden Kohar, but later he changed his name to Samin which means underprivileged. Samin was a very poor Javanese peasant farmer who spent the later part of his life developing and preaching the doctrine Samin or Saminism, which rejected the concept of colonial Dutch rule in the 19th and 20th centuries.

It was Samin's first wife who may have been the cause of his obsession with rebelling against the social norms of the time. She accused him of not being a true Muslim and tried to have their marriage annulled by the local religious leader.

“Into Samin's preaching crept a note of prophetic warning that a day of reckoning was at hand, in which the white man would be over-thrown, and a new golden age of peace and tranquility would come into being. The Samin movement spread into neighboring districts, and Communist agitators were quick to seize the opportunity to utilize the popular discontent for their own objectives. With the capture and deportation of Samin and the influx of more cautious civil administrators, the movement collapsed. But in other areas of Java, notably in Bantam, Indonesian resentment toward Dutch administrative reform is led to similar outbreaks.”

== History ==
- In 1890 Samin began developing his teachings in Klopoduwur, Blora after Dutch colonial officers declared the teak forests Dutch colonial property and started taxing the local people. Samin gathered many followers but at the time, the Dutch did not see any threat to come from this movement.
- In 1903 the number of followers grew to 722 people in 34 villages near Blora and Bojonegoro.
- In 1905 Many Saminists began to withdraw from village life, refusing to contribute to rice banks or the community animal herds.
- In 1906 Samin's sons, Surohidin and Karsijah, began actively spreading Saminist teachings in nearby villages.
- In 1907 as numbers increase to 5,000 people, the government begins to feel concerned about the number of followers, fearing a revolt, they arrest several Samin followers. A few days later, Samin himself is arrested.
- On November 8, 1907, 40 days after being imprisoned, Surontiko Samin is praised and given the title of King Panembahan Suryangalam, a Messiah-like title. Samin and eight of his followers are captured by the assistant district officer and are exiled to Padang, Sumatra. "The authorities were aware that nothing deserving of exile had been proved against Samin and his followers; but, having made the arrests, it was felt that it was too dangerous to let them return to their villages. The banishment was followed by a lull in Saminist activity; the spread into Rembang regency was reported halted. Yet the movement did not die out."
- In 1908 Wongsorejo, a follower of Samin begins to spread the teachings of Saminism in Madiun, encouraging villagers to not pay taxes to the Dutch. Wongsorejo and many of his followers are later arrested and thrown out of Java.
- In 1911 Surohidin, son of Surontiko Samin, and Engkrak one of his followers spread the teachings of Saminism in Grobogan. Karsiyah, another follower, spread the teachings in Kajen and Pati.
- In 1912 an attempt to spread Saminism to Jatirogo, Tuban fails.
- In 1914 Surontiko Samin dies in exile in West Sumatra. A new land tax begins in Java but the already thousands of Samin followers continue to refuse payment of such taxes. This land tax forced “previously exempt owners of less than 1/4 bau of pekarangan (house-plot) land liable to payment of the land tax.” Because the Dutch still continued to rule persistently, Samin resistance near vanished and went dormant.
- Throughout the 1920s the Dutch paid little to no attention to Saminism because there had been no activity from them for some time.
- August 17, 1945 Indonesia gained its independence as a new nation.
- Indonesian government reports in the early 1950s suggest that Saminism had successfully adapted itself into the newly independent Indonesia.
- However, in 1967 interest in the Saminism movement grew due to its connection with the Mbah Suro uprising, which occurred in Samin territory.
- In 1973 a Dutch researcher visited the Saminist community in a Kutuk village, where he discovered 2,000 people still practiced Saminism beliefs.

== Beliefs ==
Saminist do not see any distinction of religions, therefore Samin people will never deny or hate religion.

Though Saminists are generally non-Muslims, some followers abide by the Muslim religion. Most, however, do not believe in the existence of Allah nor heaven or hell, but instead “God is within me.” Saminists believe in the “Faith of Adam” in which stealing, lying, and adultery are forbidden. However, compliance with laws was voluntary because they recognized no authority and often withdrew from other societal norms.

In the after life Saminists believe that if one is good in this life and keeps his pledge to the religion, “he will come to life again in the form of a man” when he dies, but if he fails to do his duties and remember the religion well, “his soul will enter into the form of an animal or plant later after death.”

Marriage is very important for the Samin people. Marriage is viewed as a tool to achieve virtue and to take pride in having children. Very simple ceremonies are performed for pregnancy, birth, circumcision, marriage and death.

=== Characteristics ===
The goal of the Saminism movement centered around non-violent tactics. They would not pay taxes to the Dutch as they saw no reason to. The taxes were high and the local people barely had enough to get by. Also, Samists would freely cut wood from the teak forests after informing the village head before taking it.

Concepts and Principles

- they believe in balance, harmony, and equal justice
- do not attend school.
- do not participate in polygamy
- reject capitalism
- trading is banned because it is viewed as dishonest
- patient and humility qualities
- honest and respectful
- they do not accept donations in the form of money
- fighting is not of their nature

Clothing

- they do not wear long pants, only pants that come to their knees
- usually dress in black long sleeve shirts with no collar

== Dangir’s testimony ==
Dangir's testimony is a recorded interrogation after Dagir was arrested in 1928. Local officials wanted to learn more about Dangir along with other followers of Saminism. Officials asked several questions regarding Soerontiko Samin, Samin beliefs, motivations, everyday life and other specific questions directed toward Dangir and his family. The interrogation was performed in Javanese, but was later translated into Dutch and English. "Agama Adam" literally means the religion of Adam in Indonesian. Samin is in reference to its founder Soerontiko Samin. Wong Sikep and Samat are names given to distinguish followers of Samin or Saminists. Below is a summary of what information was gathered from Dangir's testimony.

November 26, 1928 a Samin villager by the name of Dangir was arrested for carrying out passive resistance. Dangir was 25 years old when he was interrogated and came from the Genengmulyo village. Officials interrogated Dangir to better understand the Samin religion and the followers’ mindsets. During the interview he expressed their code of conduct and everyday lifestyle. Dangir stated that orang sikep, or more commonly known as Saminists, should live moral lives abstaining from stealing, cheating, coveting, trading, having illicit sex, and lying. Orang Sikep have to work hard in the field to support their family without begging. When the officials asked him specific questions about Saminism, Dangir told them they did not believe in God, paradise or hell. This was against the Islamic beliefs shared by the majority of those living in the area. It is suggested that Dangir and his colleagues were not arrested for obstructing official business or by being Samin. They were arrested for not listening to instructions to return home while complaining in front of their district office. After officials received enough information over a three-day period, Dangir and his colleagues were released from jail. It was later argued that Dangir was not a Samin or a Samat because these words were meaningless to him. He did not personally know Soertontiko Samin, but learned the religion of Adam through another individual who was known for being one of Samin's disciples. This was enough for Dangir to become a “wong sikep,” a Samin villager. Soerontiko Samin was the one who introduced the religion of Adam that later influenced many through their personal views of authority. The religion of Adam believes in the life form of man and the life form of food and clothing. People are at the highest form of life when they are separated by male and female. In the religion of Adam it states that there are two main functions for humans: procreation and working the land to supply food; which is one of the forms of life. A Samin male is supposed to embrace both his wife and the land. This was later used as a motive for not paying taxes and taking timber freely out of the forest. Samins were known for speaking in low Javanese and using language puns. Later Soerontiko Samin and his eight disciples were banished by the government from Blora to other islands in 1907. Samin later died in exile while living in Padang, Sumatra in 1914. The government thought by eradicating the leadership and source of Saminism that the religion would dissolve and discontinue. Followers of Samin still exist in modern-day Indonesia particularly in central and eastern Java.
