= Kanor, Bojonegoro =

Kanor
- District
- Location in Bojonegoro Regency
- Coordinates: 7.1116°S 112.0357°E
- Country: Indonesia
- Province: East Java
- Regency: Bojonegoro

Government
  - Camat: Subiyono, SH, MSi

Area
  - Total: 59.78 km^{2} (23.08 sq mi)

Population (mid 2025 estimate)
  - Total: 62,710
  - Density: 1,049/km^{2} (2,717/sq mi)
- Time zone: UTC+7 Western Indonesian Time
- Postcode: 62193
- Area code: +62 353
- Website: http://kanor.bojonegorokab.go.id

Kanor (Indonesian: Kecamatan Kanor) is an administrative district (kecamatan) of Bojonegoro Regency, in East Java Province of Indonesia.

== Administration ==
Kanor consists of 25 administrative villages (Indonesian: kelurahan, desa).

1. Bakung; 2. Bungur; 3. Cangakan; 4. Caruban; 5. Gedongarum; 6. Kabalan; 7. Kanor; 8. Kedungprimpen; 9. Nglarangan; 10. Palembon	11. Pesen; 12. Pilang; 13. Piyak; 14. Prigi; 15. Sarangan; 16. Sedeng; 17. Semambung; 18. Simbatan; 19. Simorejo; 20. Samberan	21. Sroyo; 22. Sumberwangi; 23. Tambahrejo; 24. Tejo; 25. Temu
