= Bojonegoro Regency =

Regency in East Java, Indonesia

Bojonegoro Regency Kabupaten Bojonegoro
- Regency

Other transcription(s)
  - Javanese: Bojanegara (Gêdrig) بَوجانۤڮارا (Pégon) ꦧꦺꦴꦗꦤꦼꦒꦫ (Hånåcåråkå)
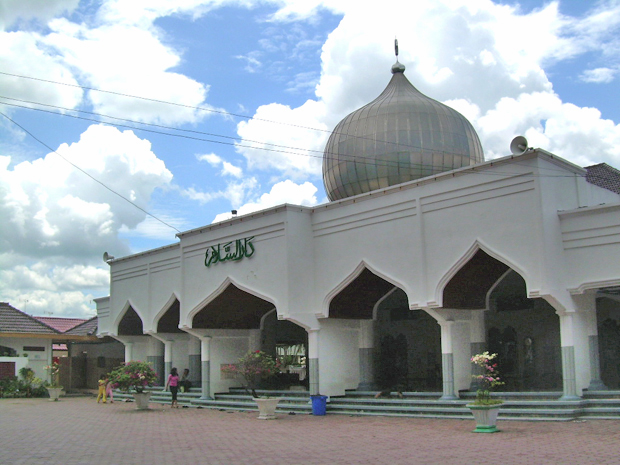
- Darussalam Mosque in Bojonegoro

- Coat of arms
- Motto: Jer karta raharja mawa karya (official) (Javanese: Hard works are needed to prosper); Bojonegoro matoh (informal) (Javanese: Great Bojonegoro)
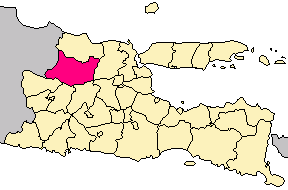
- Location within East Java

- Location in Java and Indonesia Bojonegoro Regency (Indonesia)
- Coordinates: 7°16′30″S 111°47′42″E
- Country: Indonesia
- Province: East Java
- Capital: Bojonegoro; 7°9′0″S 111°52′53″E

Government
  - Regent: Setyo Wahono
  - Vice Regent: Nurul Azizah

Area
  - Total: 2,307.06 km^{2} (890.76 sq mi)
- Elevation: 14 m (46 ft)

Population (mid 2025 estimate)
  - Total: 1,367,980
  - Density: 592.954/km^{2} (1,535.74/sq mi)
- Time zone: UTC+7 (IWST)
- Postcode: 62xxx
- Area code: (+62) 353
- Website: bojonegorokab.go.id

Bojonegoro Regency (Indonesian: Kabupaten Bojonegoro, older spelling is Kabupaten Bodjanegara, Javanese: ꦧꦺꦴꦗꦤꦒꦫ, romanized: Bojånegårå) is a regency in East Java Province of Indonesia, about 110 km west of Surabaya and 73 km northeast of Ngawi. It covers a land area of 2,307.06 km^{2} (890.76 miles^{2}) and is located in the inland part of the northern Java plain, mainly on the south bank of the Solo River, the longest river in Java. It had a population of 1,209,973 at the 2010 Census and 1,301,635 at the 2020 Census; the official estimate as of mid 2025 was 1,367,980 (comprising 687,186 males and 680,794 females). The administrative centre of the regency is the town of Bojonegoro.

Previously known as a major producer of teak and tobacco, Bojonegoro is a focus of attention in Indonesia as a new oil field has been found in this area. This oil find is the biggest oil discovery in Indonesia in three decades and one of the biggest reserves in Indonesia.

== Geography ==
Across the eastern border of Bojonegoro is the Lamongan Regency, to the north is the Tuban Regency, while to the south are the Ngawi Regency, Madiun Regency, Nganjuk Regency, and Jombang Regency. Blora Regency is located to the west, in Central Java Province.

Bojonegoro occupies an area of 2,307.06 km^{2}. Much of it consists of low plains along the Solo River, with hilly areas in the southern part of the Regency. As with most of Java, the Bojonegoro landscape is dominated by rice paddy fields. In the Bojonegoro area, the Solo River changes its course from northward to eastward.

The climate in Bojonegoro is tropical with six months of rainy and dry seasons. Seasonal conditions are often very contrasting. In the rainy season, rain will fall almost daily while in the dry season, rain will not come for months, causing widespread drought and water shortages. These problems have been compounded with the loss of forests and other green areas. The teak forest once covered much of Bojonegoro, but has since considerably reduced due to over-exploitation.

Floods in the rainy season of 2007 were bigger than in previous years. The water level of the Solo River rose due to heavy rain, especially in the upper valley in Central Java, forcing the Gajah Mungkur Dam to be opened. The resulting flood submerged 15 districts, with water as high as 1.5 m, and displaced 2,700 families. A further 2.5 hectares of rice fields were damaged. No casualties were reported.

== Climate ==
Bojonegoro has 42-100% of humidity. Maximum humidity is 100% and average humidity is 81%. Bojonegoro has 0–35 km/h of wind velocity. Maximum wind velocity is at 35 km/h (18.9 knots). The average wind velocity is 30 km/h (16.2 knots). It has an average temperature of 27.1 °C - 28.2 °C.

Month	1	2	3	4	5	6	7	8	9	10	11	12
Average Temperature (Celsius)	26.6	26.5	26.8	27.2	27.1	26.6	26.4	26.7	27.6	28.2	28.0	27.1
Min Temperature (Celsius)	22.8	22.7	22.8	22.9	22.6	21.7	21.1	21.1	21.8	22.7	23.1	22.8
Max Temperature (Celsius)	30.4	30.4	30.8	31.5	31.6	31.6	31.6	32.4	33.4	33.7	33.0	31.4

== History ==
The area near the Solo River is fertile and has been settled since early history by the Javanese. However, these settlements never developed into major urban center, except for several coastal cities. Rather, villages are dependent on a weekly market which rotates among them and bakul (traveling peddlers) collect and distribute agricultural and manufactured products among the villages.

The Solo River played a major role in the development of these settlements. It acted as a source of water and fertile soil, and a means of transportation. A set of copper plates of the Ferry Charter (1358 C.E.) lists over twenty ferry crossings on the lower stretch of the Solo River, downstream from Bojonegoro. Inland settlements would trade agricultural products via trading centres in the coastal cities, like neighbouring Tuban, for spices from Spice Islands, ceramics from China, and other commodities.

The authority over these settlements, including the territory of modern-day Bojonegoro, was held by the dominant power in Central Java, and later East Java, the kingdoms of Mataram, Kediri, Singhasari, and Majapahit.

As a territory in northern Java, the area of modern-day Bojonegoro was one of the first to accept Islam. The Solo River area and most of Java would become part of the Sultanate of Demak and its successor the Sultanate of Mataram.

The modern regency (kabupaten) was founded on October 20, 1677, with Mas Toemapel as the first regent (bupati), with its capital in Jipang village (currently around Padangan District in the westernmost part of Bojonegoro). It was founded as a response to the loss of Mataram's coastal area to the Dutch East India Company. Bojonegoro then became an important border town. In 1725 the capital was moved to its current location.

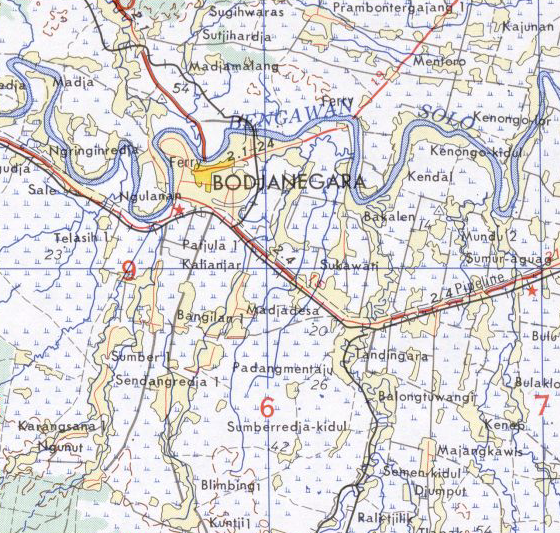
Bojonegoro town, East Java, Indonesia. Circa 1950

After the Dutch took over Java in the 18th and 19th centuries, Bojonegoro and the neighbouring regencies of Tuban and Lamongan were administered under Bojonegoro Residency, with a Dutch Resident in Bojonegoro town. The resident acted as an advisor and supervisor to the regents, positions which were held by native Javanese nobility (priyayi).

During Dutch rule, tobacco and maize were introduced from the Americas, which would later become major commodities in Bojonegoro.

In 1894, the trans-Java railroad, which linked Batavia and Surabaya and passed through Bojonegoro, was finished, increasing transportation and improving the teak industry. Urbanisation also progressed under Dutch rule.

Since the Indonesian National Revolution, Bojonegoro regency has been administered as part of East Java province, with R.M.T. Suryo, the grandson of the former Bojonegoro regent as its first governor. In 2008, the Bojonegoro people elected its first directly elected regent, following an amendment in the constitution. Suyoto of the National Mandate Party was elected as regent. In the 2018 Election, Dr Hj. Anna Muawannah (PKB-National Awakening Party) won the election by a majority (30.7%) and was elected as regent.

== Administrative districts ==
At the 2010 Census, Bojonegoro Regency was divided into twenty-seven districts (kecamatan), but in 2012 an additional district - Gayam District - was created from parts of the existing Ngasem and Kalitidu Districts. These are tabulated below with their areas and population totals from the 2010 Census and the 2020 Census, together with the official estimates as of mid 2025. The table also includes the locations of the district administrative centres, the number of administrative villages in each district (totaling 419 rural desa and 11 urban kelurahan - the latter all in Bojonegoro District), and its postal codes.

Kode Wilayah	Name of District (kecamatan)	Area in km^{2}	Pop'n Census 2010	Pop'n Census 2020	Pop'n Estimate mid 2025	Admin centre	No. of villages	Post codes
35.22.22	Margomulyo	139.68	21,971	22,798	23,410	Margomulyo	6	62168
35.22.01	Ngraho	71.48	41,454	45,976	48,420	Ngraho	16	62165
35.22.02	Tambakrejo	209.52	51,362	54,478	57,000	Tambakrejo	18	62166
35.22.03	Ngambon	48.65	10,977	11,624	12,020	Ngambon	5	62167
35.22.27	Sekar	130.24	25,749	27,411	28,960	Sekar	6	62169
35.22.05	Bubulan	84.73	13,655	15,005	15,660	Bubulan	5	62172
35.22.26	Gondang	107.01	23,793	24,980	26,780	Gondang	7	62173
35.22.21	Temayang	124.67	33,906	35,932	38,000	Temayang	12	62184
35.22.07	Sugihwaras	87.15	42,875	46,439	47,960	Sugihwaras	17	62183
35.22.08	Kedungadem	145.15	76,788	82,112	85,440	Kedungadem	23	62195
35.22.09	Kepohbaru	79.64	59,759	64,912	68,270	Kepohbaru	25	62194
35.22.10	Baureno	66.37	73,701	80,183	85,450	Baureno	25	62192
35.22.11	Kanor	59.78	53,806	59,637	62,710	Tambahrejo	25	62193
35.22.12	Sumberrejo	76.58	66,665	70,017	73,820	Sumberrejo	26	62191
35.22.13	Balen	60.52	61,724	65,813	68,940	Balen	23	62182 ^{(a)}
35.22.24	Sukosewu	47.48	39,563	42,448	44,730	Sukosewu	14	62185
35.22.14	Kapas	46.38	49,973	54,975	58,080	Kapas	21	62181
35.22.15	Bojonegoro	25.71	83,008	84,967	88,350	Bojonegoro	18 ^{(b)}	62111: 62119
35.22.23	Trucuk	36.71	35,638	38,150	40,510	Trucuk	12	62155 ^{(c)}
35.22.06	Dander	118.36	76,107	83,979	88,030	Dander	16	62171
35.22.04	Ngasem	147.21	71,191	59,605	63,130	Ngasem	17	62154
35.22.28	Gayam	50.05	^{(d)}	32,555	34,470	Gayam	12	62152: 62154
35.22.16	Kalitidu	65.95	60,880	50,102	52,380	Kalitidu	18	62152
35.22.17	Malo	65.41	28,390	30,654	32,680	Malo	20	62153
35.22.18	Purwosari	62.32	27,051	29,676	31,110	Purwosari	12	62161
35.22.19	Padangan	42.00	40,220	43,479	45,360	Padangan	16	62162
35.22.20	Kasiman	51.80	28,226	30,731	32,460	Kasiman	10	62164
35.22.25	Kadewan	56.51	11,541	12,997	13,890	Kadewan	5	62160
	Totals	2,307.06	1,209,973	1,301,635	1,367,980	Bojonegoro	430	

Notes: (a) except for the village of Margomulyo, which has a postcode of 62168.
(b) comprising 11 kelurahan (Banjarejo, Jetak, Kadipaten, Karang Pacar, Kepatihan, Klangon, Ledok Kulon, Ledok Wetan, Mojokampung, Ngrowo and Sumbang) and 7 desa.
(c) except for the village of Sumberejo, which has a postcode of 62191.
(d) the population of Gayam District in 2010 is included in the figures for Ngasem and Kalitidu Districts, from parts of which it was created in 2012.

== Demographics ==
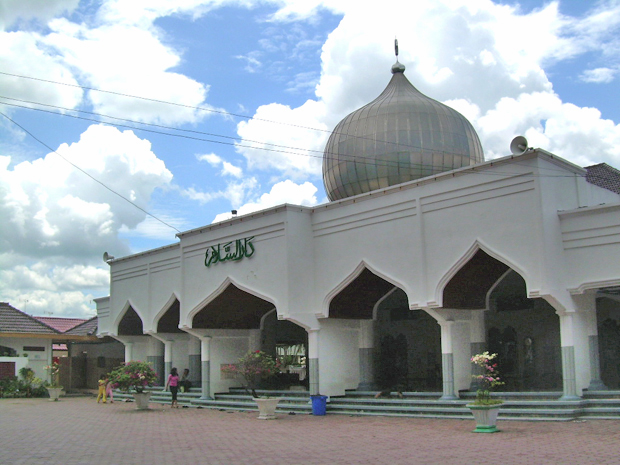
Bojonegoro Great Mosque

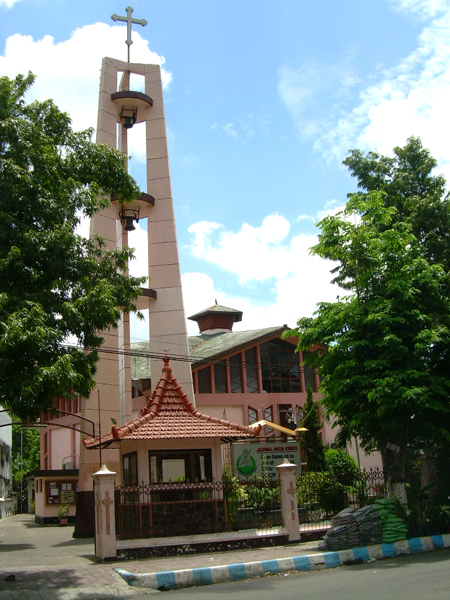
St. Paul Catholic Church

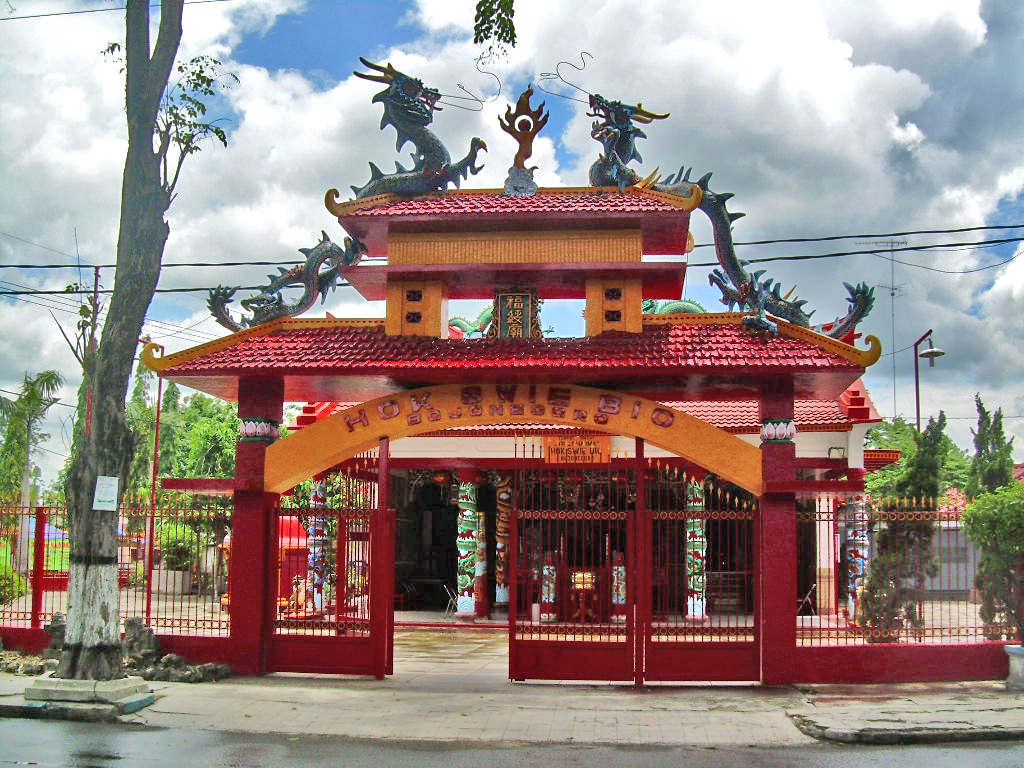
Hok Swie Bio Confucian Temple

Bojonegoro Regency has a population of 1,363,058 people (as of mid-2023). Most of the population work as farmers or foresters. Many still live in poverty, especially in the southern part of the regency, where the soil is less fertile. The major population centre is Bojonegoro town, located on the southern bank of the Bengawan Solo River.

=== Ethnic groups ===
The racial makeup of this regency is mainly Javanese, with a minority of Chinese, Madurese, Balinese, Batak people, and other Indonesian ethnic groups.

=== Language ===
Most residents speak Javanese as a daily language and Indonesian on formal and writing activities, though a minority speak Madurese and other languages.

=== Religion ===
Most Javanese and Madurese are Muslim, with a small number belonging to Christian sects. Chinese follow various religions, often with an aspect of syncretism with traditional Chinese culture.

== Economy ==
=== Agriculture ===
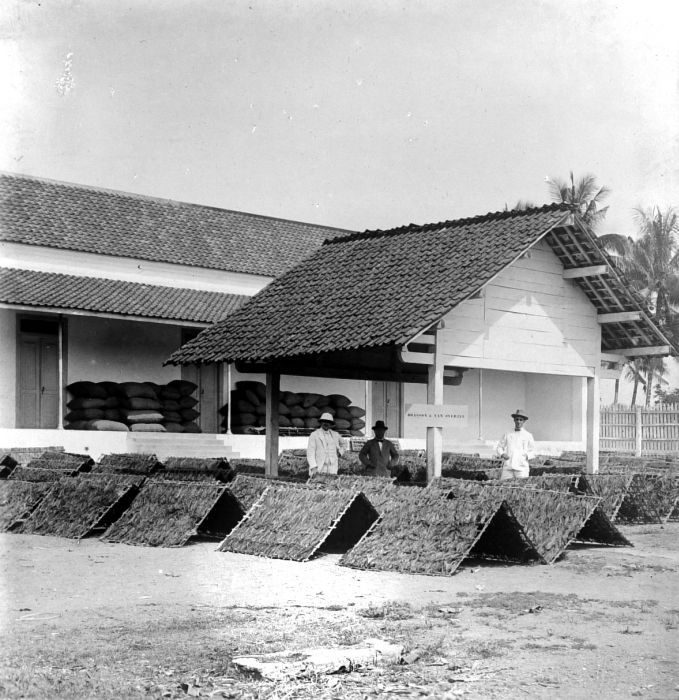
Drying tobacco leaves in Bojonegoro during colonial period.

Agriculture has been the regency's main industry. The Solo River provides a fertile farming area for rice. The main crops are rice and tobacco, as well as maize. In 1984, the area of maize harvested reached 67,000 hectares with yields ranging from 1 to 1.28 t/ha. A typical farmer grows rice in the rainy season, when water is abundant, and tobacco or maize in the dry season. There is a high risk in agriculture because of seasonal uncertainty. Rice growing will fail if the rainy season ends before its time, and tobacco growing will fail if rain comes early.

Bojonegoro is one of the biggest producers of tobacco in Indonesia, with a total value of Rp1.2 trillion (around US$100 million) and employing 57 percent of the workforce. The majority of tobacco planted is Virginia varieties. However, Bojonegoro tobacco suffers from a high proportion of chlorine, and uncertain rainfall. Most tobacco is used to make clove cigarettes (kretek).

=== Forestry ===
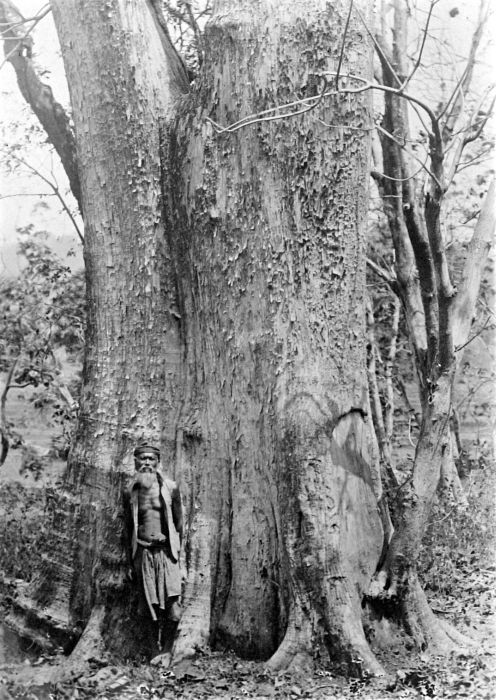
An old jati (teak wood) tree in Bojonegoro during colonial period, 1900–1940.

Bojonegoro is also known for its hardwood tree (teak) production. There is an annual Bojonegoro Teak Fair in late January to early February where local craftsmen display their products. Teak is mainly used in shipbuilding and furniture making. A teak cutter is called blandong in the local Javanese dialect.

Teak forestry faces a major problem in illegal logging, as with other parts of Indonesia. In 2001 alone, the area looted covered 3,000 ha; looters stole an estimated 27,000 trees. The regional police reported impounding 550 large trucks of stolen timber, approximately 2,000 m^{3}, with an estimated local market value of US$1,000,000. Several riots have happened when tension arose from teak claims and when police tried to enforce the law on local thieves.

These riots were the worst during the period of turmoil between President Abdurrahman Wahid and Megawati Sukarnoputri in 2001. However, after that situation calmed, enforcement became better, but illegal logging is still a significant problem, with police and bureaucratic officials often accused of cooperating with timber thieves.

=== Petroleum and gas ===
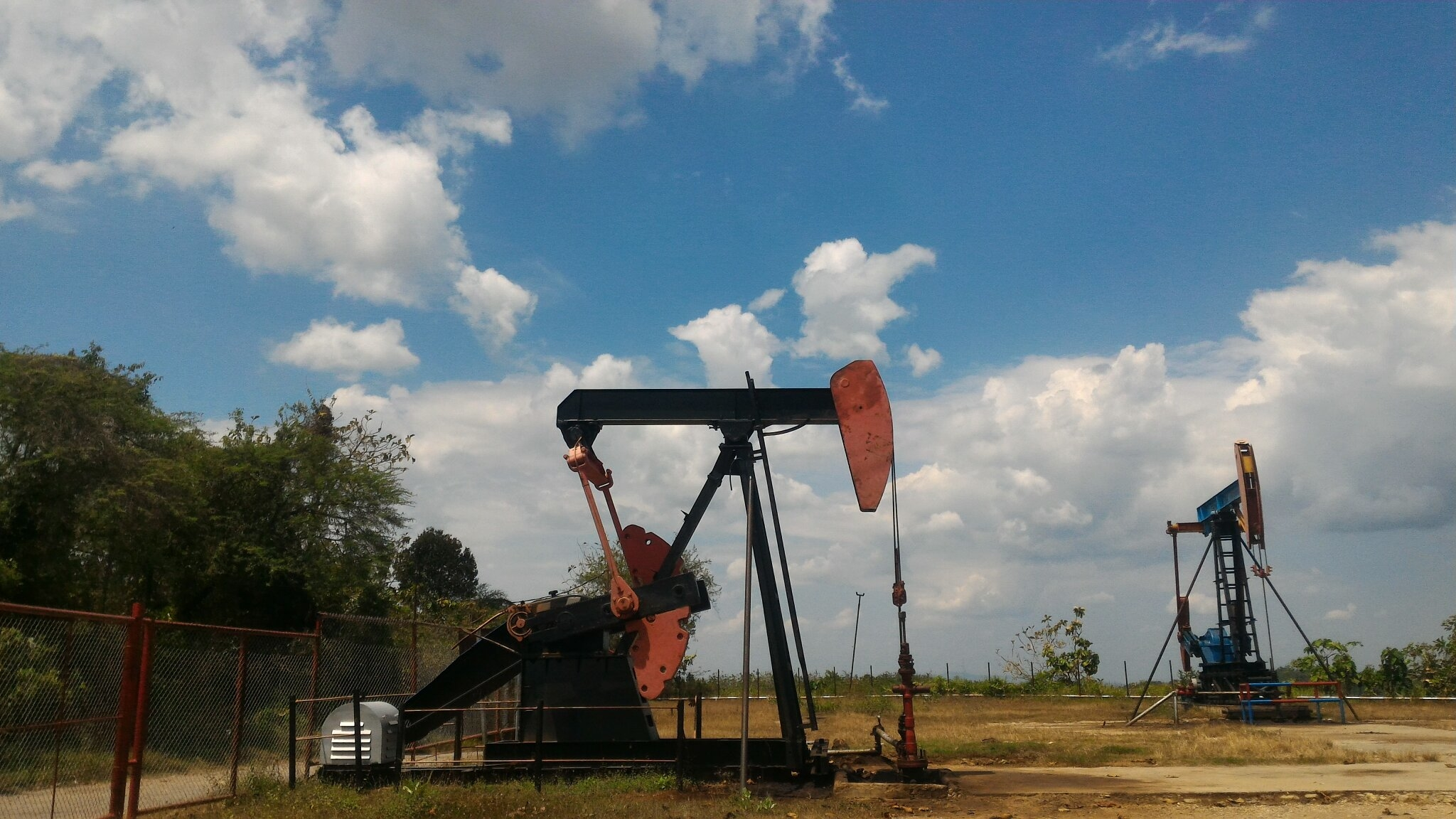
Pumpjacks in Kedewan district

The recent discovery of oil and gas fields in the area is providing new economic opportunities.

The oil/gas fields locations include Banyu Urip, Alas Dara, Alas Tua West, Alas Tua East, Jambaran, Cendana (ExxonMobil 45%, Pertamina 45%, local companies 10% - under Joint Operating Agreement), and Sukowati (Operated under Joint Operating Body - Petrochina Pertamina East Java).

The Banyu Urip oil and gas field has proven oil reserves of over 250 million barrels (40,000,000 m^{3}), with peak production of about 165,000 barrels (26,200 m^{3}) per day, accounting for 20 percent of the present national crude oil production.

The main exploration started officially when a cooperative contract was signed on September 17, 2005, with Mobil Cepu Ltd., a subsidiary of ExxonMobil as the main operator. A joint operation agreement between state oil company Pertamina was signed in March 2006. Pertamina and ExxonMobil concluded a 30-year production-sharing contract in which each company would share 45 percent interest in the block. The remaining 10 percent would go to the local governments. Foreign companies, mainly from China, have started to invest in Bojonegoro in various projects related to the planned exploration and exploitation of the Cepu Block oil fields with a total value of US$8 million. According to the former minister and ambassador to the United States, Dorodjatun Kuntjoro-Jakti, Tuban and Bojonegoro would resemble Texas, because of its gas and oil resources.

Communities in Bojonegoro have benefited from community development projects by foreign companies like ExxonMobil, which have built houses of worship, schools, community health centers, and infrastructure. However, oil production is becoming a source of controversy.

Some Regional Representatives Council (Dewan Perwakilan Rakyat, DPD) members grouped in the People's Front for the Salvation of the Cepu Block (GRPBC) have called for the cancellation of the joint operation agreement between the government and ExxonMobil on the Cepu Block oil fields. They demand it is canceled because the agreement had been signed "in an atmosphere rife with suspected corruption, collusion and nepotism, and based on a public lie" and will make the Indonesian government lose US$1.32 billion of revenue. And Now, the New Bojonegoro Leader (Bupati Bojonegoro) are waiting for a new agreement with ExxonMobil to avoid corruption, collusion, and nepotism.

Oil exploration and production activity has also caused several accidents. On August 31, 2006, a gas leak in the Sukowati-5 oil well (Operated by JOB Pertamina Petrochina East Java) released hydrogen sulfide gas to residential areas. At least 16 villagers had to be treated for suffocation because of the gas inhalation.

The environmental effects of the oil industry have become a concern of Bojonegoro residents. Some villagers claimed the presence of the oil well has not caused any improvement in the local economy and the village. Since the exploration of the Sukowati oil well in an area measuring five hectares in July 2005, the village's land has become drier and harvest significantly reduced. There is also concern that income distribution inequality could cause social unrest when compounded with the Indonesian notorious reputation of corruption.

== Infrastructure ==
=== Transport ===
==== Roads and intercity bus services ====
Indonesian National Route 20 traverses Bojonegoro from Babat, goes south to Ngawi, and joins Indonesian National Route 15 which goes east from Yogyakarta to Surabaya in Caruban. The road also meets Indonesian National Route 1 at a junction in Babat.

Bojonegoro regency is served by extensive intercity bus services (stopping and express) offering routes to neighbouring regencies, Surabaya, Malang, Denpasar, Bandung, and Greater Jakarta, usually starting and terminating at Rajekwesi bus station in the eastern part of Bojonegoro district.

==== Railways ====
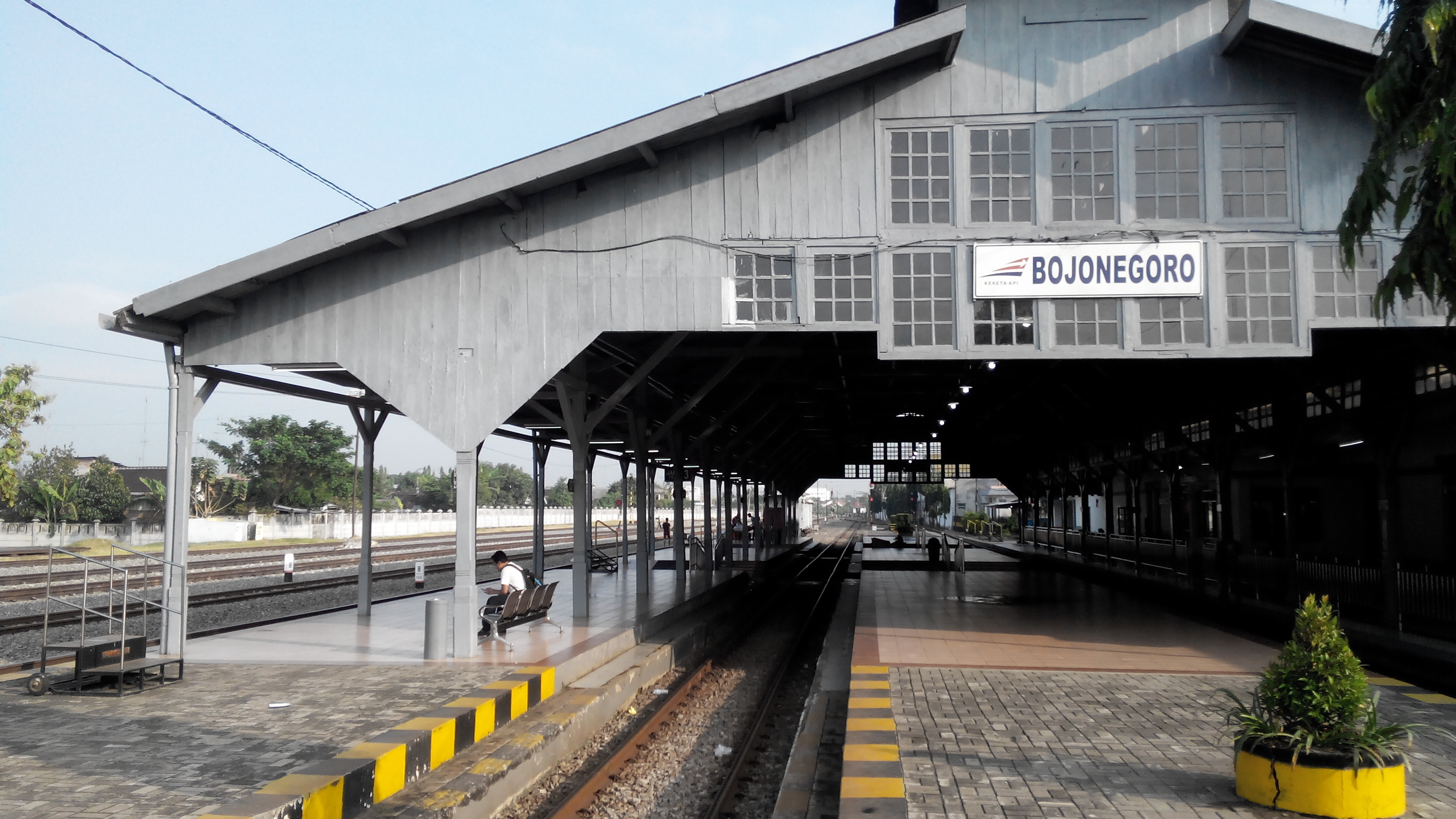
Bojonegoro railway station

Bojonegoro is well served by trains operated by PT Kereta Api Indonesia. The train service began after the completion of the trans-Java railroad which connected Batavia (Jakarta) and Surabaya in 1894. A double-tracking project connecting Semarang and Surabaya via Bojonegoro finished on 3 September 2014. Bojonegoro Regency has 6 railway stations spread across the regency: Bojonegoro, Kapas, Sumberrejo, Bowerno, Kalitidu, and Tobo

== Culture ==
=== Snack ===
Ledre is a snack from Bojonegoro. It is rolled and made from bananas, especially from the local banana cultivar called Pisang Raja.

=== Local media ===
Bojonegoro has two local television network B-One TV and JTV Bojonegoro. Radar Bojonegoro (Jawa Pos Group) is published daily as a bundle of Jawa Pos newspaper. A monthly tabloid, Blok Bojonegoro, is also based in the regency.

=== Sport ===
Football (soccer) and badminton are the most popular sports in Bojonegoro. The regency football team, Persibo Bojonegoro, is currently playing in the Indonesian Premier League, the highest level of professional competition for football clubs in Indonesia since 2011. Their home stadium is Lt Gen Sudirman Stadium, Bojonegoro.

Badminton was either introduced by Dutch colonists or, more likely, by ethnic Chinese. Ethnic Chinese in Sumatra introduced badminton from Malaya by inviting Chinese players in the early 1930s. In the mid-1930s, a player from Batavia, Oei Kok Tjoan, visited cities in East Java on some occasions, raising the popularity of badminton. The game began to penetrate small towns such as Tuban, Bojonegoro, Malang, and Jember and became one of the most popular sports in Java.

In archery, athletes from Bojonegoro have dominated many national and international archery championships. Rina Dewi Puspitasari and I Gusti Nyoman Puruhito Praditya have competed in national and international archery competitions, including the 2004 Summer Olympics. As of October 2006, Rina Dewi Puspitasari is ranked 39th in the Recurve Women category with 59.95 points. Praditya is ranked 52 in the Compound Man category with 41.2 points.

=== Samin people ===
One of the distinctive communities in Bojonegoro is the Samin people. They were ethnically indistinguishable from other Javanese people. Samin people are follower of Surosentiko Samin, a local farmer who preached pacifist resistance to Dutch colonial rule in the 1890s. Samin was incited by the acquisition of local teak forest by Dutch colonial authority. Dutch officials refused access to the forest for local people, as it was claimed as Dutch property. Rather than rising in a violent uprising, Samin taught peaceful resistance, such as refusing to pay taxes to the colonial authority and continuing to take teak from the forest as they had for generations. Samin people are nominally Muslim but do not practice many Islamic rituals, such as fasting or regular prayer. Rather, they emphasize the spiritual aspect, as well as honesty, modesty, and simplicity. In this, they are similar to Kejawen's followers. Samin people reside in the southwestern part of Bojonegoro (in the heart of its teak forest) and in Blora Regency, Central Java.

== Notable persons ==
- Abdoel Gaffar Pringgodigdo, Minister of Justice (21 January – 6 September 1950) and Minister of State Secretariat (19 August – 14 November 1945)
- Anis Hidayah, activist
- Aries Tuansyah, footballer
- Budiono Darsono, journalist and founder of DetikCom
- Bijahil Chalwa, footballer
- Hanis Sagara Putra, footballer
- Ika Yuliana Rochmawati, archer
- Mochammad Zaenuri, footballer
- Novan Sasongko, footballer
- Pratikno, Indonesian minister of state secretariat (incumbent)
- Rina Dewi Puspitasari, archer
- Samsul Arif, footballer
- Sumarsan, traditional Javanese musician
- Titie Said, writer, journalist and chair of the Indonesian Film Censorship Board from 2003 to 2006 and from 2006 to 2009.
- Jihan Nurlela, physician and politician
