= Mantingan =

District in Ngawi Regency, Indonesia

Mantingan District
- district
- Interactive map of Mantingan District
- Coordinates: 7°22′5.4″S 111°09′52″E
- Country: Indonesia
- Province: East Java
- Regency: Ngawi

Area
  - Total: 68.75 km^{2} (26.54 sq mi)
- Elevation: 93 m (305 ft)

Population (mid 2024 estimate)
  - Total: 38,123
  - Density: 554.5/km^{2} (1,436/sq mi)
- Time zone: UTC+7 (WIB)

Mantingan is an administrative district (kecamatan) in Ngawi Regency, in East Java Province of Indonesia.

== Geography ==
Mantingan is situated on the border of Central Java Province and East Java Province.

== See also ==
- Districts of Indonesia
- List of regencies and cities of Indonesia
