= Bojonegoro District =

City and capital of Bojonegoro Regency, Indonesia

Bojonegoro
- District
- Location in Bojonegoro Regency
- Coordinates: 7.1525°S 111.8869°E
- Country: Indonesia
- Province: East Java
- Regency: Bojonegoro

Government
  - District head: Drs. Ir. Bagus Kumoro H.R.H, MSi

Area
  - Total: 25.71 km^{2} (9.93 sq mi)

Population (mid 2025 estimate)
  - Total: 88,350
  - Density: 3,436/km^{2} (8,900/sq mi)
- Time zone: UTC+7 Western Indonesian Time
- Postcode: 62111 - 62119
- Area code: +62 353

Bojonegoro District (Indonesian: Kecamatan Bojonegoro) is a town which serves as the capital of Bojonegoro Regency, East Java, Indonesia.

== Administration ==
Bojonegoro District is divided into 18 administrative villages (Indonesian: kelurahan, desa).

1. Banjarejo; 2. Jetak; 3. Kadipaten; 4. Karang Pacar; 5. Kepatihan; 6. Klangon; 7. Ledok Kulon; 8. Ledok Wetan; 9. Mojokampung	10. Ngrowo; 11. Sumbang; 12. Campurejo; 13. Kalirejo; 14. Kauman; 15. Mulyoagung; 16. Pacul; 17. Semanding; 18. Sukorejo

== Education ==
Bojonegoro District has a comprehensive education system. Primary and secondary education institutions in Bojonegoro include 33 elementary schools (Indonesian: Sekolah Dasar, or SD), 10 junior high schools (Indonesian: Sekolah Mengengah Pertama, or SMP), 5 vocational senior secondary schools (Indonesian: Sekolah Menengah Kejuruan, or SMK), 6 senior high school (Indonesian: Sekolah Menengah Atas, or SMA). Higher education are provided by Universitas Bojonegoro, Universitas Terbuka, Sekolah Tinggi Ilmu Ekonomi Cendekia, Sekolah Tinggi Ilmu Kesehatan Icsada, Sekolah Tinggi Ilmu Kesehatan Muhammadiyah, Akademi Kesehatan Rajekwesi, Akademi Kebidanan Pemerintah Kabupaten Bojonegoro, Akademi Komunitas Negeri Bojonegoro, and IKIP PGRI Bojonegoro.

== Climate ==
Bojonegoro has a tropical monsoon climate (Am) with moderate to little rainfall from May to October and heavy rainfall from November to April.

Climate data for Bojonegoro
Month	Jan	Feb	Mar	Apr	May	Jun	Jul	Aug	Sep	Oct	Nov	Dec	Year
Mean daily maximum °C (°F)	30.4 (86.7)	30.4 (86.7)	30.8 (87.4)	31.5 (88.7)	31.6 (88.9)	31.6 (88.9)	31.7 (89.1)	32.0 (89.6)	33.4 (92.1)	33.7 (92.7)	33.0 (91.4)	31.4 (88.5)	31.8 (89.2)
Daily mean °C (°F)	26.6 (79.9)	26.5 (79.7)	26.8 (80.2)	27.2 (81.0)	27.1 (80.8)	26.6 (79.9)	26.4 (79.5)	26.7 (80.1)	27.6 (81.7)	28.2 (82.8)	28.0 (82.4)	27.1 (80.8)	27.1 (80.7)
Mean daily minimum °C (°F)	22.8 (73.0)	22.7 (72.9)	22.8 (73.0)	22.9 (73.2)	22.6 (72.7)	21.7 (71.1)	21.1 (70.0)	21.1 (70.0)	21.8 (71.2)	22.7 (72.9)	23.1 (73.6)	22.8 (73.0)	22.3 (72.2)
Average rainfall mm (inches)	281 (11.1)	255 (10.0)	287 (11.3)	171 (6.7)	113 (4.4)	68 (2.7)	40 (1.6)	28 (1.1)	40 (1.6)	81 (3.2)	191 (7.5)	288 (11.3)	1,843 (72.5)
Source: Climate-Data.org

== Transport ==
Bojonegoro District and nearby areas in Bojonegoro Regency are well served by Bojonegoro railway station with a direct connection to Jakarta, as well as to Surabaya, Semarang, Bandung, Ngawi and Malang.
