= Modo, Lamongan =

Modo District Kecamatan Modo
- district
- Interactive map of Modo District
- Coordinates: 7°12′45″S 112°08′25″E
- Country: Indonesia
- Province: East Java

Government

Area
  - Total: 77.80 km^{2} (30.04 sq mi)

Population (2024 estimate)
  - Total: 50,686
  - Density: 651.5/km^{2} (1,687/sq mi)
- Time zone: UTC+7 (WIB)
- Website: lamongankab.go.id/instansi/modo/

Modo is an administrative district (kecamatan) in Lamongan Regency, in East Java Province of Indonesia.
