= Bojonegoro railway station =

Railway station in Indonesia

Bojonegoro Station Stasiun Bojonegoro B15 A28

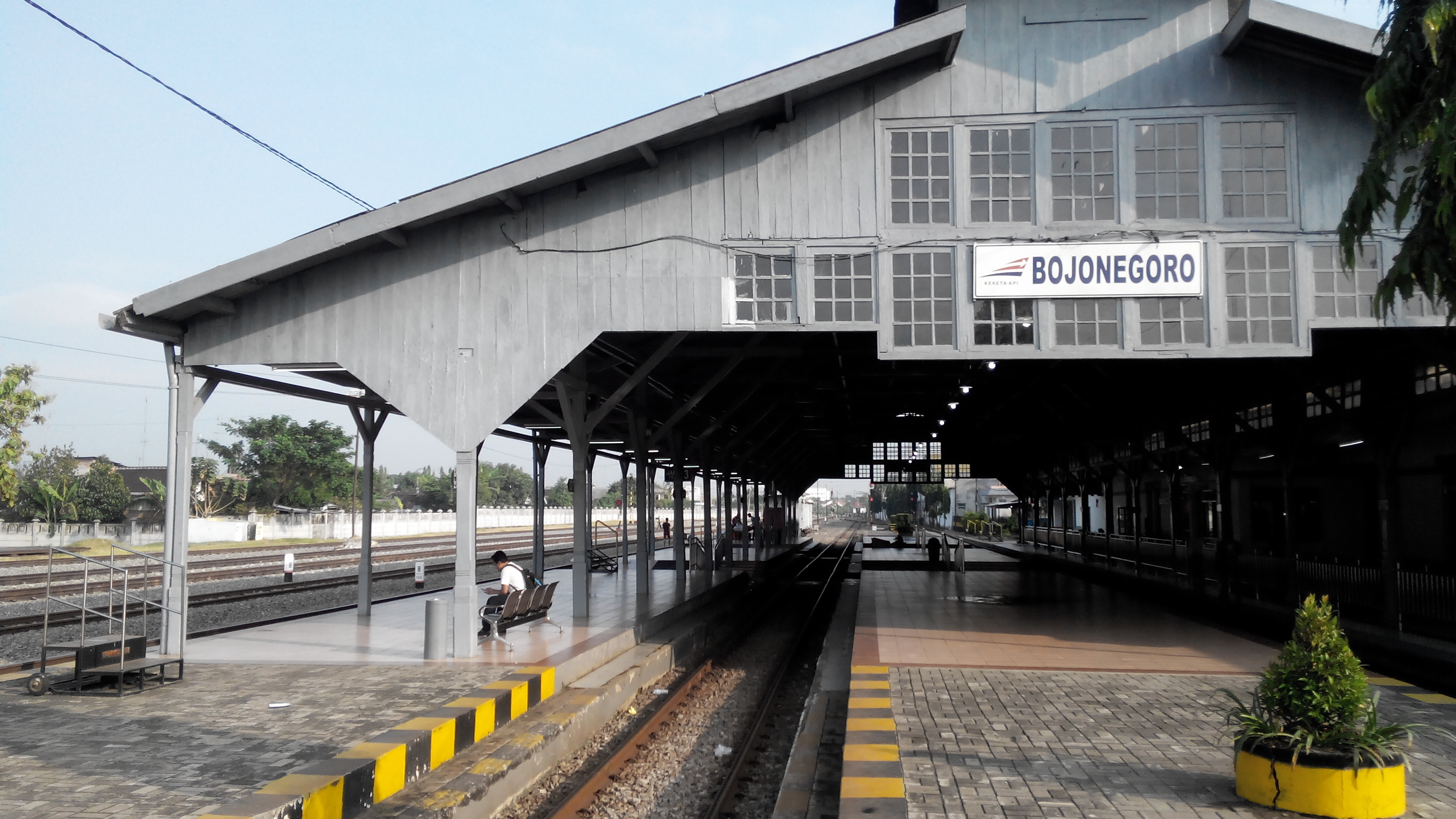
- Platform level

General information
- Location: Jl. Gajah Mada 65, Sukorejo, Bojonegoro, Bojonegoro Regency, 62115; East Java; Indonesia
- Coordinates: 7.1642802°S 111.8866837°E
- Elevation: +15 m (49 ft)
- Owner: Kereta Api Indonesia
- Operator: Kereta Api Indonesia
- Line: Gambringan–Surabaya Pasar Turi
- Platforms: single side platform double island platforms
- Tracks: 7

Construction
- Structure type: Ground
- Parking: Available
- Accessible: Available

Other information
- Station code: BJ
- Classification: I

History
- Opened: 1 March 1902

Passengers
- 2018: 290,172

Services
Preceding station		Following station
Terminus	Commuter Line Arjonegoro	Kapas A27 towards Surabaya Pasarturi or Sidoarjo
Cepu B18 Terminus	Commuter Line Blorasura	Kapas B14 towards Surabaya Pasarturi
Location
- Location within Bojonegoro Regency

Bojonegoro Station is the largest railway station in Sukorejo, Bojonegoro, Bojonegoro Regency, East Java. The station is owned and operated by PT Kereta Api Indonesia.

== Services ==
=== Intercity ===
Bojonegoro Station is served with intercity rail services that cover longer distances than regional rail services and usually call only at large stations along the way. Sembrani has all executive (first class) train set and provides the fastest traveling time to Jakarta and Surabaya. Gumarang and Harina have mixed classes consisting of executive and economy (second class). Both Kertajaya and Jayabaya consist of all economy train sets. The only intercity train that does not stop at Bojonegoro station is Argo Bromo Anggrek. All intercity services are operated by PT Kereta Api Indonesia.

- Sembrani, which travels between Jakarta Gambir and Surabaya Pasar Turi, calls at Bojonegoro once daily in each direction.
- Gumarang, which travels between Jakarta Pasar Senen and Surabaya Pasar Turi, calls at Bojonegoro once daily in each direction.
- Harina, which travels between Surabaya Pasar Turi and Bandung via Cikampek, calls at Bojonegoro once daily in each direction.
- Kertajaya, which travels between Jakarta Pasar Senen and Surabaya Pasar Turi, calls at Bojonegoro once daily in each direction.
- Jayabaya, which travels between Jakarta Pasar Senen and Malang via Surabaya Gubeng, calls at Bojonegoro once daily in each direction.
- Ambarawa Express, which travels between Surabaya Pasar Turi and Semarang Poncol starting service from 4 October 2016, calls at 10.17 for eastbound train and calls at 14.40 for westbound train.
- Maharani, which travels between Surabaya Pasar Turi and Semarang Poncol, calls at Bojonegoro once daily in each direction.

=== Regional ===
Bojonegoro railway station is also served with some regional rail services that operate between small towns and cities with more stops over shorter distances than intercity rail services.

- Bojonegoro Local, serves commuters to Surabaya Pasar Turi, Surabaya Gubeng, and Sidoarjo once daily.

=== Self-service machines ===
To ease queueing at ticket counters, a self-service ticket printing machine (Indonesian: mesin cetak tiket mandiri) and an electronic ticket kiosk have been installed. Since 9 August 2016, all passengers must check themselves in and print boarding passes at self-service check-in machines (Indonesian: mesin check-in mandiri) before boarding in addition to showing tickets and valid identifications (e.g. Kartu Tanda Penduduk/KTP, Surat Izin Mengemudi/SIM or passport).

Preceding station	Kereta Api Indonesia	Following station
Kalitidu towards Gambringan	Gambringan–Surabaya Pasar Turi	Kapas towards Surabaya Pasar Turi
