= Ngawi (town) =

Capital and city of Ngawi, Indonesia

- Capital of Regency
- District of Ngawi; Kecamatan Ngawi

Other transcription(s)
  - Javanese: Ngawì (Gêdrig) ڠاوي (Pégon) ꦔꦮꦶ (Hånåcåråkå)
  - Chinese: 加維; Jiāwéi (Pinyin); Ka-uî (Hokkien POJ)
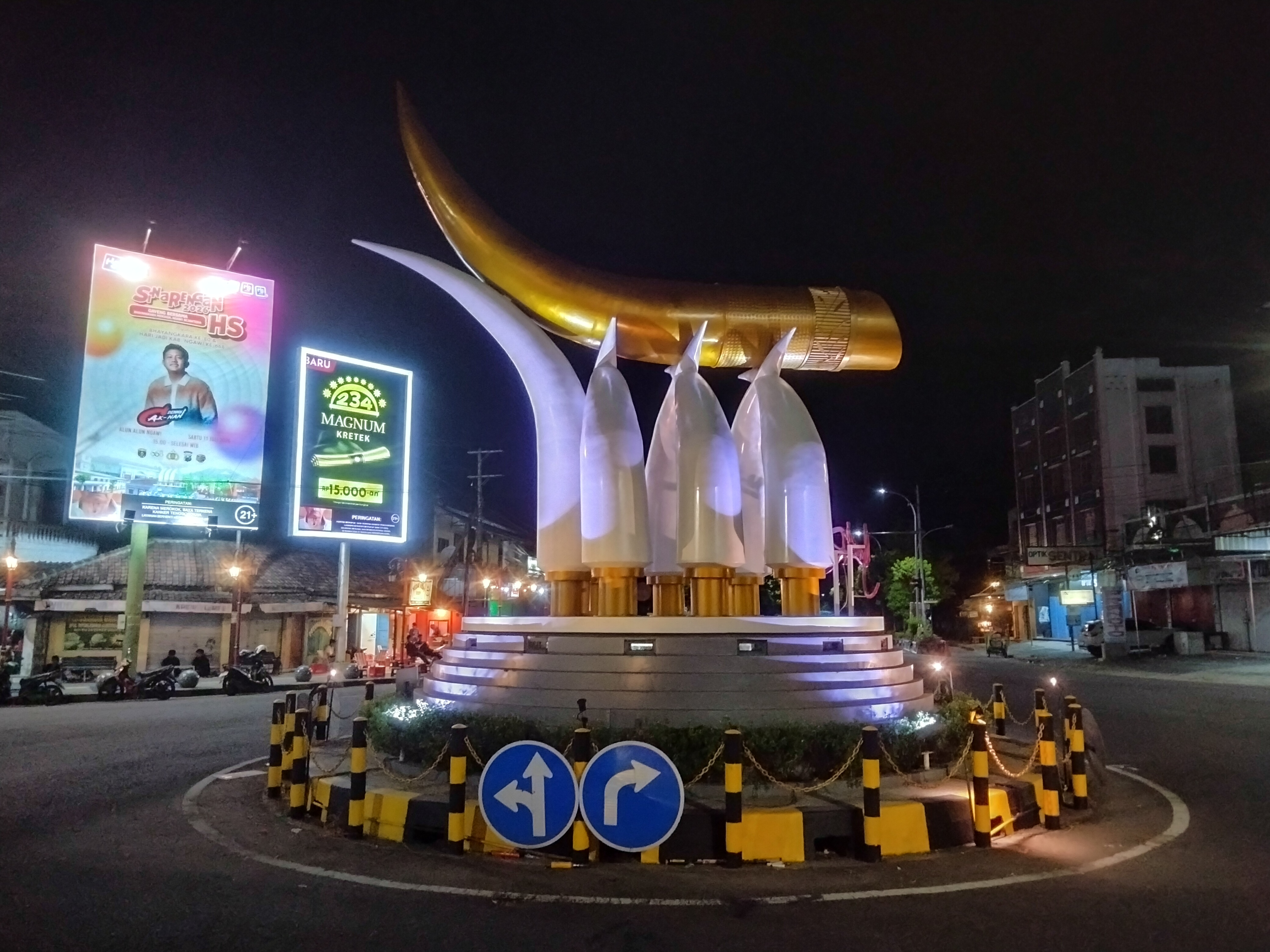
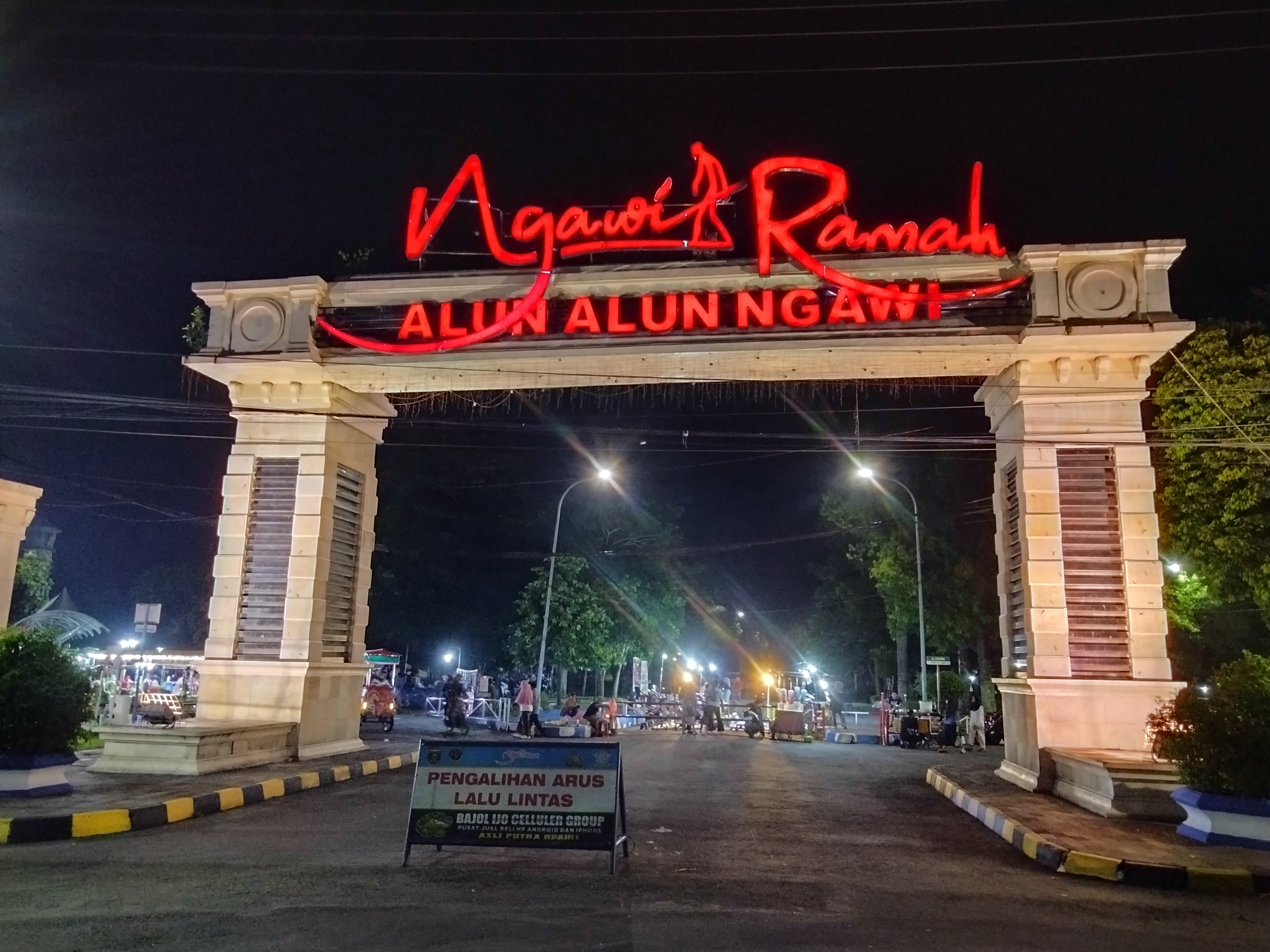
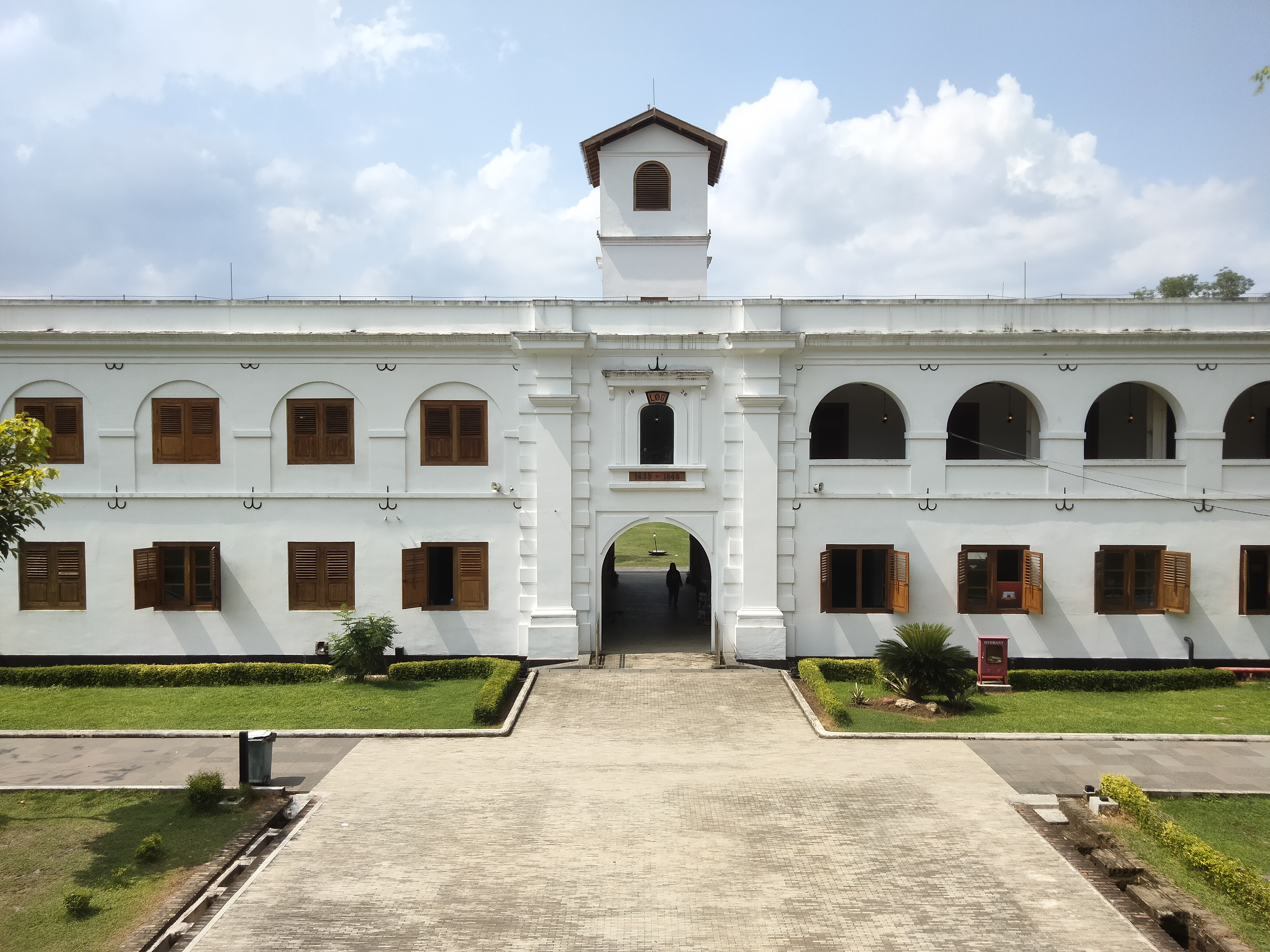
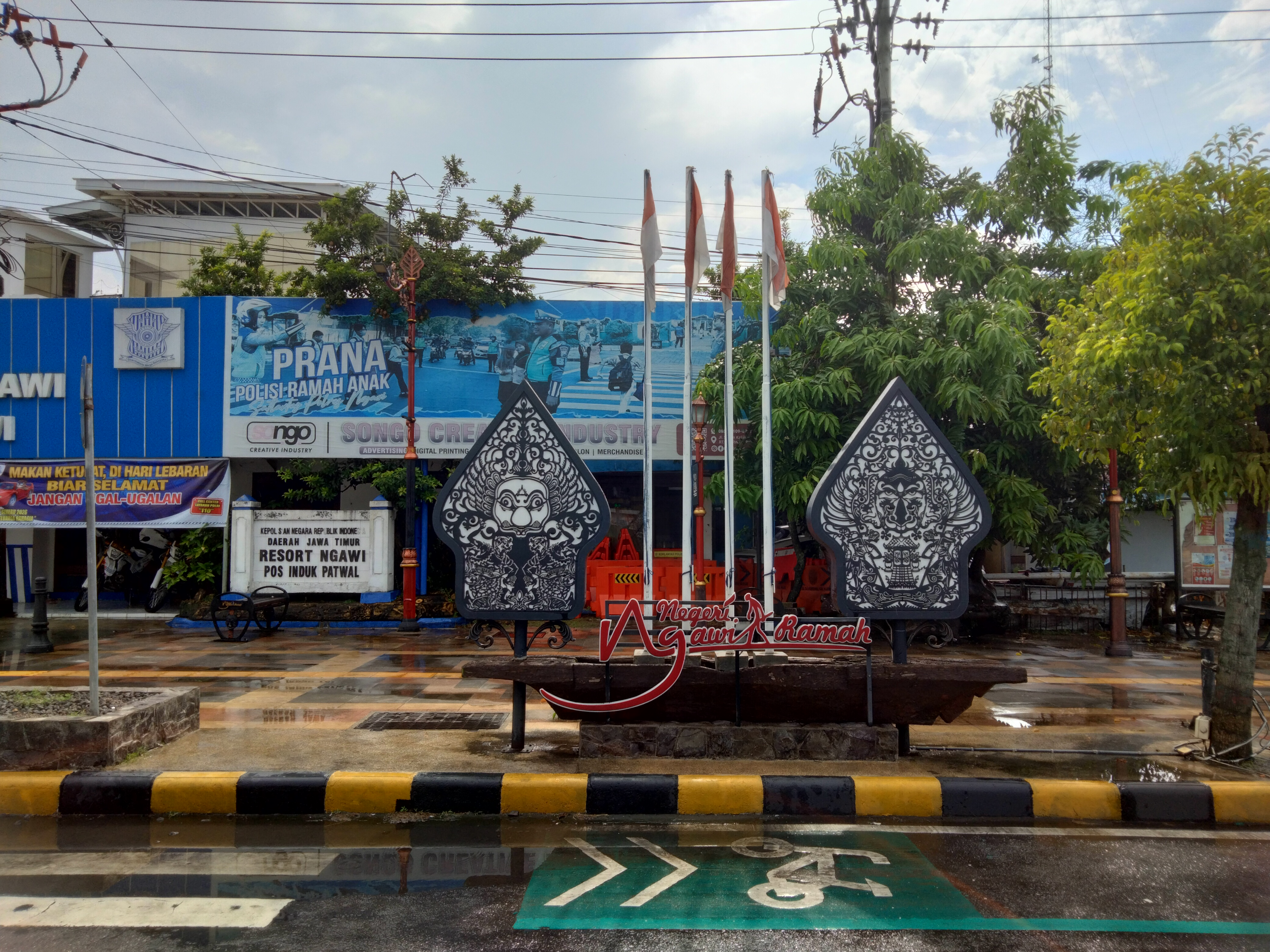
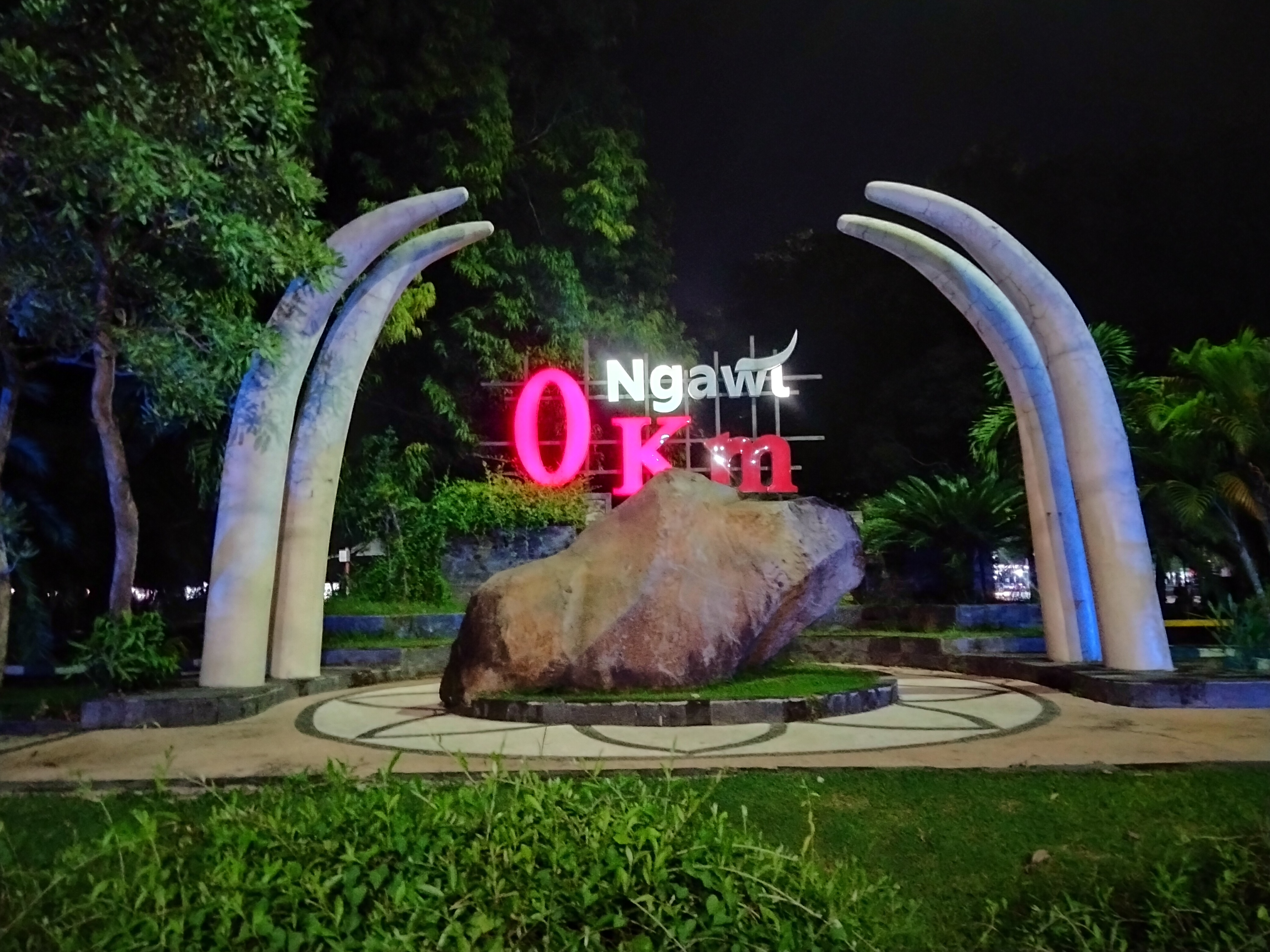
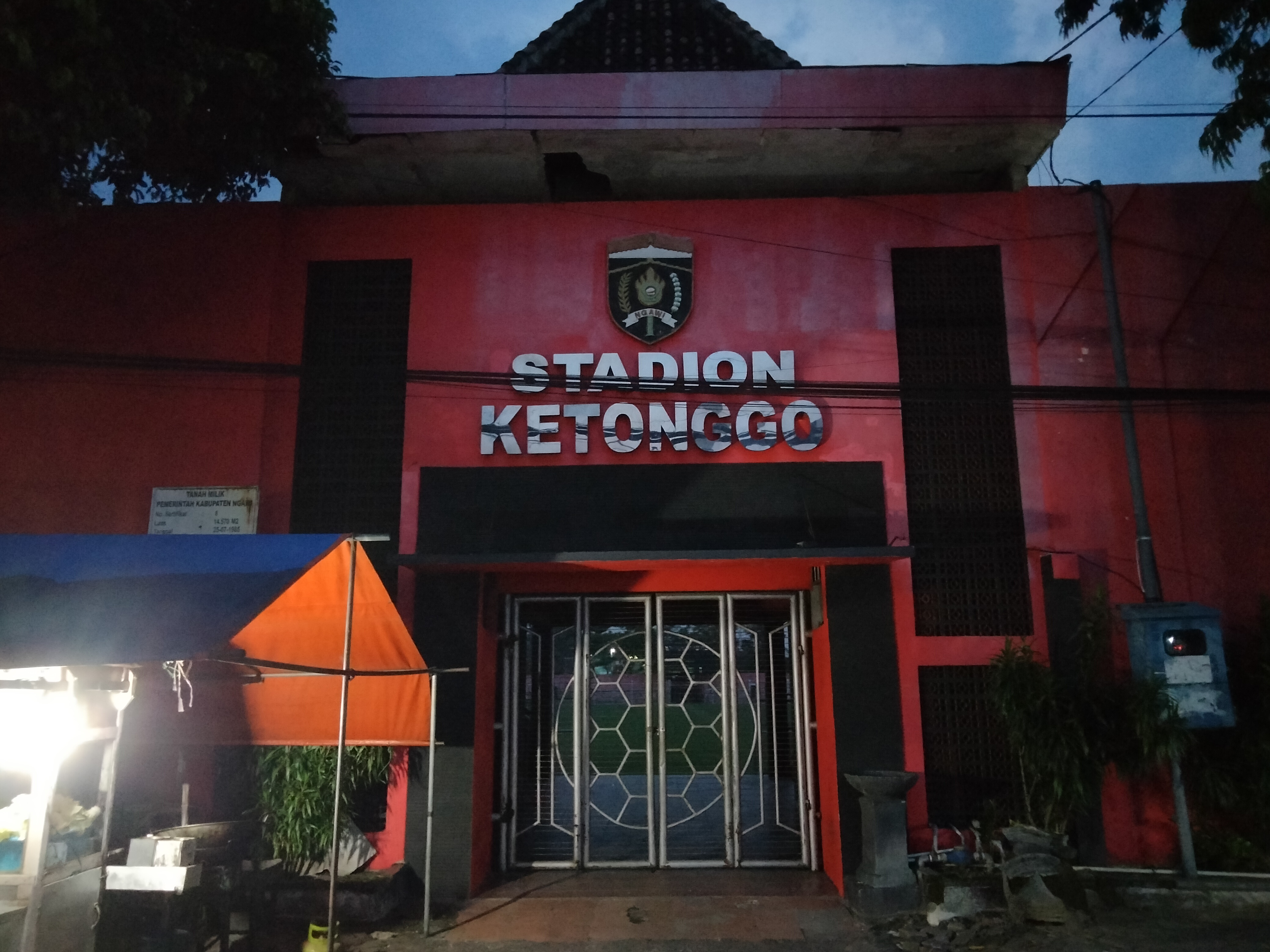
- Kartonyono monuments Ngawi square (alun-alun) Fort van den Bosch Ngawioboro Street Center Point 0 kilometers of Ngawi city Ketonggo Stadium
- Nicknames: Kota Ramah (Friendly City), Kota Benteng (Fortress City)
- Motto: Ngawi Berakhlak "Ngawi has morals"
- Map of Ngawi City
- Location In Indonesia Location in Asia Ngawi (town) (Indonesia) Ngawi (town) (Asia)
- Coordinates: 7°24′38″S 111°27′28″E
- Country: Indonesia
- Region: Java
- Province: East Java
- Regency: Ngawi
- Established: July, 7th 1358

Government
  - Type: District head–council
  - Body: Ngawi District Government
  - District Head: Arin Royanto
  - District Secretary: Agung Wahyu Wibowo
  - Head of government section: Eko Syuhrul Fatoni
  - General Subdivision: Delta Pranowo

Area
  - Total: 81.08 km^{2} (31.31 sq mi)
- Elevation: 50 m (160 ft)

Population (mid 2024 estimate)
  - Total: 85,817
  - Density: 1,217/km^{2} (3,150/sq mi)
- Demonym: Ngawians

Demographics
  - Ethnic group: Javanese; Madura; Osing; Sundanese; Bantenese; Arabs; Chinese etc.
  - Religion: Islam 97.09%; Christianity 2.82%; Catholicism 0.85%; Protestantism 1.97%; Buddhism 0.05%; Hinduism 0.03%; Others 0.01%
- Time zone: UTC+07:00 (Indonesia Western Time)
- Postcode: 63211–63218
- Area code: (+62) 351
- Vehicle registration: AE J**/K*
- HDI: ▲78,88 (2023) high
- Bus station (main bus station): Kertonegoro bus station
- Train station (main train station): Ngawi railway station
- Largest villages or ward by area: Kandangan – 9.01 square kilometres (3.48 sq mi)
- Largest villages or ward by population: Beran (12,054 – 2022 est)
- Website: ngawi.ngawikab.go.id

Ngawi (Indonesian: Kecamatan Ngawi Kota, Indonesian pronunciation: [ŋaˈwi]) is a city in the Ngawi Regency, East Java Province of Indonesia which is the capital and the centre of government and economy of Ngawi Regency. Ngawi is also the name of an administrative district (kecamatan) which is within the Regency. This district is located 183 km west of Surabaya and 610 km east of Jakarta. Geographically, Ngawi District is in the middle of the northern part of Ngawi Regency. Infrastructure and settlements from Ngawi Regency are also concentrated in this town, which is the center of education for Ngawi Regency, with almost a quarter of the total school buildings in Ngawi Regency in this district.

In mid 2024 the population in Ngawi town was estimated at 85,817 with a density of around 1,058 people per square kilometre. Almost one-tenth of the total population of Ngawi Regency is domiciled in this district, which has an area of 81.08 km^{2} of which around 48 percent is paddy fields, rivers and plantations, the remainder is in the form of residential land, offices or agencies, shops, industry and other urban infrastructure.

This District is directly adjacent to Pitu and Margomulyo Districts, Bojonegoro Regency to the north, Kasreman District and Pangkur District to the east, Geneng District, Kwadungan District and Paron District to the south and especially Paron District to the west.

== History ==
=== Etymology ===
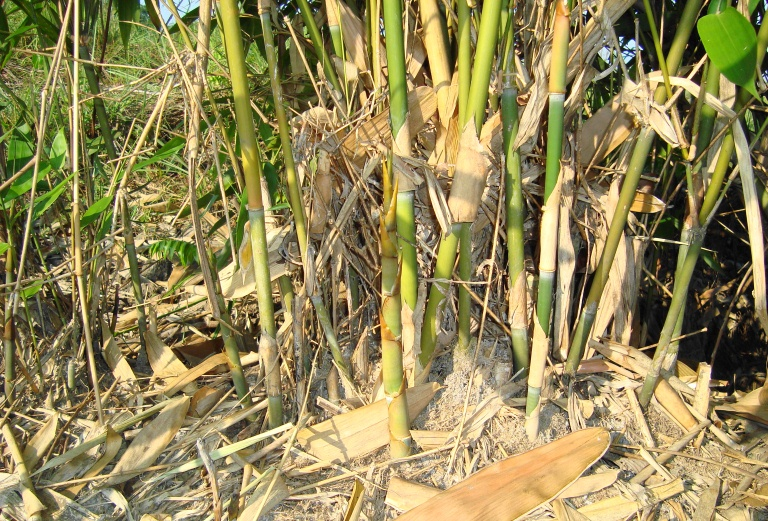
Ngawi is taken from the word "Awi" which means bamboo tree

Ngawi comes from the word "AWI", which means bamboo which then gets the nasal letters "Ng" to become "NGAWI". As is the case with names in other areas, there are lots of place (village) names associated with plant names. As Ngawi pointed out, a place around the edge of Solo River and Madiun River is overgrown with bamboo.

=== Kingdoms ===
In the past, Ngawi came from the word awi/bamboo and at the same time indicated Ngawi's location as a district on the banks of the Bengawan Solo and Madiun rivers. Based on research on ancient objects, it shows that in Ngawi there has been a religious activity since the Airlangga government which still lasted until the end of the reign of the Kingdom of Majapahit.

This is reinforced by several inscriptions, one of which is the Cangu Inscription which is a legacy of King Hayamwuruk (Sri Rajasanegara) from Majapahit which has the Saka year 1280 (1358) which states that Ngawi is a private area. The enshrinement fragments show a spiritual nature which is closely related to the worship of Mount Lawu (Girindra), but over time there has been a shift due to the influence of Islam as well as the culture brought by the Europeans especially the Dutch who long enough dominate the government in Indonesia.

=== Dutch colonial ===
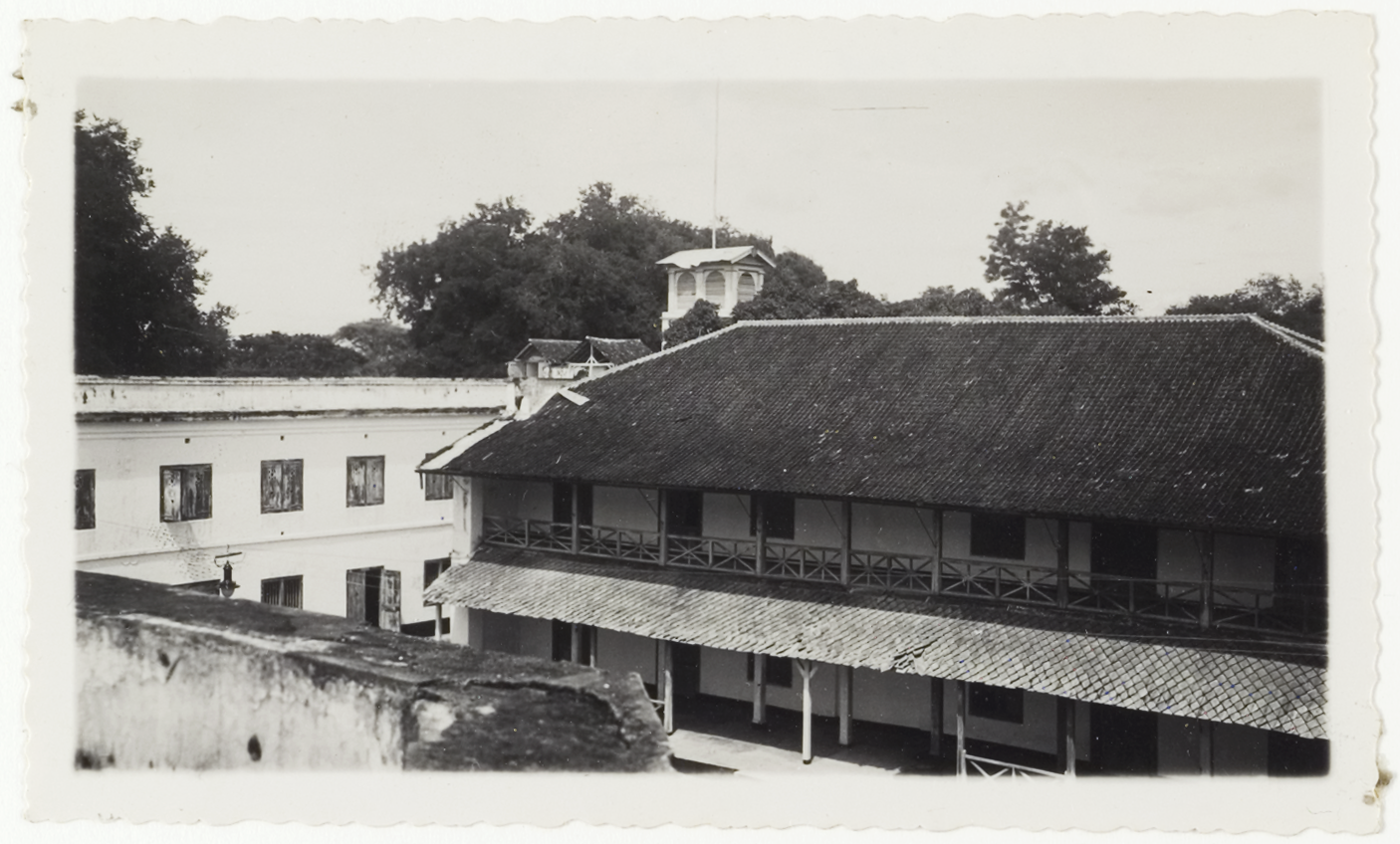
The Dutch government at that time was headquartered in Fort van den Bosch

Another relic is in the form of the Van den Bosch fortress. Now it is called Pendem fort because the location of the fort is underground so it is not visible from the outside. As for its location at the confluence corner between the 2 rivers Bengawan Solo and Madiun. Fort van den Bosch was built between 1839 and 1845 by the Dutch East Indies government, at which time Ngawi had an important position in the field of transportation. With quite an important role in the past, so that Ngawi can survive and develop into a subdistrict and even the forerunner of the regencial itself. Besides that, Ngawi has played an important role in traffic since prehistoric times, having an important geostrategic position.

=== Position of the Dutch government ===
Fort Van den Bosh is administratively located in the region Pelem, Ngawi (city), Ngawi. This fort is known to have been built in the mid-19th century. The reason the Dutch colonial government built Fort van den Bosch began when Ngawi was successfully occupied by the Dutch in 1825. At that time, Ngawi was known as the center of trade and shipping in East Java via Solo river and Madiun river and is one of the gateways to districts and cities in East Java.

The Dutch colonial government wanted Ngawi's strategic position and function and control of the trans-Java trade route at that time. For this reason, the Dutch finally decided to build a government building in the form of a fort, finally it was named Fort van den Bosch. The Dutch colonial government used this fort as protection when fighting Prince Diponegoro's struggle. In this fort there is the tomb of K. H. Muhammad Nursalim, a prominent cleric who was also a fighter and companion of Prince Diponegoro.

Then he was arrested by the Dutch, then imprisoned and buried alive. Kyai Muhammad Nursalim is also known as the figure who first spread Islam in Ngawi.

== Geography ==
Kartonyono Ivory Monuments

Ngawi District is located in the middle of Ngawi Regency which is also the Ngawi part of town. The total area of Ngawi District is 81.08 km^{2}. Administratively, this area is divided into 4 urban villages and 12 rural villages, subdivided into 86 hamlets.

Geographically, Ngawi District is located at 7°35'–7°48' South Latitude and 111°38'–111°50' East Longitude. It is also flanked by two major rivers, namely the Solo River and Madiun River rivers which flow directly to the northern part of the Ngawi District.

=== Borderline ===
- Pitu District, Margomulyo Districts to the north (on Bojonegoro Regency)
- Kasreman District, Pangkur District to the east
- Geneng District, Paron District to the south
- Paron District to the west

=== Geology ===
The geological condition of Ngawi city consists of Alluvium, Litosol, Mergel and Limestone Lands. Based on geological conditions, Ngawi is categorized as an area that is relatively safe from earthquakes because it is located far from the Kendeng fault line which is located in the Randublatung and most of the area Bojonegoro Regency. This area has unstable soil contours or moves during the dry season in the form of hollow soil or cracked soil so that infrastructure development requires geotechnical engineering.

=== Topography ===
Ngawi is located in the center of the northern part of Ngawi Regency. The area is directly adjacent to Kasreman and Pangkur Districts to the east, Kwadungan and Geneng Districts to the south, Paron District in the west and Pitu and Margomulyo Districts in the north. The majority of the Ngawi District area is lowland, namely 72.08% with an altitude between 43 – 57 meters above sea level, while the rest are hilly areas, namely 27.92% which are in the northern Ngawi region, namely Kerek Village, Ngawi Villy, Banyuurip Village and some areas Karangtengah Prandon Village north with an altitude between 57 – 133 meters above sea level. Soil structure in Ngawi consists of alluvial soil, the result of river deposits Solo River and Madiun river, in the north and northeast there are hills which are included in the Kendeng mountain area which contains high levels of lime because the majority of the land in Ngawi to the north and northeast is in the form of less fertile rocky soil. In Ngawi there are two large rivers namely Solo river and Madiun river. The Madiun River is one of the two main rivers that divide parts of the Ngawi region namely Ngawi District to the west and Ngawi District to the east or what is often called the ancient Ngawi region. Paddy fields and plantations are located in the western, southern and eastern regions of the city's Ngawi District while the forest area is in the north of Ngawi which is directly adjacent to Margomulyo.

=== Climate ===
The climate in Ngawi District is a tropical climate, similar to the climate in Ngawi Regency. The temperature, weather, rainfall and humidity in the Ngawi District are not much different from the climate in Ngawi Regency. But the difference is only a few numbers. Based on Köppen climate classification, Ngawi District is included in the wet and dry tropical climate category (Aw) with two seasons in a year namely rainy season and dry season. Rainfall in Ngawi averages 163 mm per month and 1,951 mm per year. The highest rainfall above 200 mm occurs from January to March and November to December. The average air temperature in Ngawi ranges from 24.7 °C to 29.8 °C.

Climate data for Ngawi (city), Ngawi, Indonesia
Month	Jan	Feb	Mar	Apr	May	Jun	Jul	Aug	Sep	Oct	Nov	Dec	Year
Record high °C (°F)	30.1 (86.2)	30.8 (87.4)	31.6 (88.9)	32.3 (90.1)	31.4 (88.5)	32.6 (90.7)	32.2 (90.0)	33 (91)	34.4 (93.9)	35 (95)	32.6 (90.7)	33.2 (91.8)	35 (95)
Mean daily maximum °C (°F)	28 (82)	28.6 (83.5)	29.3 (84.7)	29.9 (85.8)	29.1 (84.4)	29.7 (85.5)	29.2 (84.6)	29.8 (85.6)	31.3 (88.3)	32 (90)	30.5 (86.9)	30.8 (87.4)	29.9 (85.7)
Daily mean °C (°F)	25.9 (78.6)	26.4 (79.5)	27 (81)	27.5 (81.5)	26.8 (80.2)	26.8 (80.2)	26.2 (79.2)	26.7 (80.1)	28.2 (82.8)	28.9 (84.0)	28.4 (83.1)	28.3 (82.9)	27.3 (81.1)
Mean daily minimum °C (°F)	23.8 (74.8)	24.2 (75.6)	24.7 (76.5)	25.1 (77.2)	24.5 (76.1)	23.9 (75.0)	23.3 (73.9)	23.6 (74.5)	25 (77)	25.8 (78.4)	26.3 (79.3)	25.8 (78.4)	24.7 (76.4)
Record low °C (°F)	21.7 (71.1)	22 (72)	22.5 (72.5)	22.7 (72.9)	22.2 (72.0)	21 (70)	20.3 (68.5)	20.5 (68.9)	21.9 (71.4)	22.8 (73.0)	24.3 (75.7)	23.4 (74.1)	20.3 (68.5)
Average precipitation mm (inches)	304.2 (11.98)	267.9 (10.55)	218.5 (8.60)	156.3 (6.15)	131.7 (5.19)	110.9 (4.37)	88.1 (3.47)	31.2 (1.23)	43.2 (1.70)	94.7 (3.73)	205.7 (8.10)	298.6 (11.76)	1,951 (76.83)
Source: BMKG

== Government ==
Ngawi is led by a district head who is then assisted by a district secretary or secretariat in carrying out his duties. The current head of the Ngawi District is Arin Royanto, who has served since early 2026 and is assisted by a district secretary named Agung Wahyu Wibowo.

=== Administrative region ===
Administratively, the Ngawi District area has 12 rural villages (desa) and 4 urban villages (kelurahan) which are divided into 86 hamlets (dusun) or neighborhoods (lingkungan). The following is a list of names of the villages (desa and kelurahan) located in Ngawi District:

Name Ward or village	Area in km^{2}	Pop'n estimate 2022	Number of hamlets	Postal code	Ministry of Affairs code
Banyuurip Village	6.03	1,798	3	63218	35,21,09,2005
Beran	7.46	12,054	9	63216	35,21,09,2006
Grudo	5.05	7,019	6	63214	35,21,09,2008
Jururejo	3.59	6,321	6	63215	35,21,09,2007
Kandangan	9.01	6,461	6	63218	35,21,09,2002
Karang Asri	4.97	8,001	3	63218	35,21,09,2004
Karangtengah Prandon Village	6.29	5,750	8	63218	35,21,09,2011
Kartoharjo Village	5.86	3,924	4	63218	35,21,09,2003
Kerek Village	2.64	1,139	3	63218	35,21,09,2012
Mangunharjo Village	8.01	6,002	6	63218	35,21,09,2001
Ngawi Village	1.95	2,902	9	63218	35,21,09,2010
Watualang	7.91	5,969	8	63218	35,21,09,2009
Karangtengah town Ward	0.66	3,308	6	63218	35,21,09,1014
Ketanggi Ward	1.01	5,579	6	63211	35,21,09,1015
Margomulyo Ward	2.16	7,033	4	63217	35,21,09,1013
Pelem Ward	0.62	1,643	3	63212	35,21,09,1016

== Demographics ==
=== Religion ===
Religion in Ngawi town
1. Islam (97.1%)
2. Protestantism (1.97%)
3. Catholicism (0.85%)
4. Buddhism (0.05%)
5. Hinduism (0.03%)
6. Others (0.01%)

As of 30 June 2022, the majority religion in Ngawi District is Islam, whose total adherents reach 97.09% or as many as 83,368 people of the entire population of Ngawi District, with its total population of 85,862. In Ngawi there is also the Baiturrahman Grand Mosque, which is the largest mosque in the district and even in Ngawi Regency. The mosques in this district are almost evenly distributed to the outskirts of the Ngawi District.

Other religions adhered to by the majority of the population include Christianity, with 2,420 people (2.82%) of whom Protestants total 1,689 people (1.97%) and Catholics total 731 people (0.85%). The majority of its adherents come from ethnic Chinese and ethnic East Indonesia and a minority of local Javanese. In Ngawi District there are also several churches including the St. Yosef Ngawi Catholic Church, the Jawi Wetan Ngawi Christian Church, Pentecostal Church in Indonesia Karang Asri, GBIKA Ngawi and so forth.

Other religions adhered to by residents of Ngawi District apart from Islam and Christianity are Buddhism with 45 people (0.05%), Hinduism with 29 people (0.03%) and the rest are Treat of YME of 4 souls (0.01%).

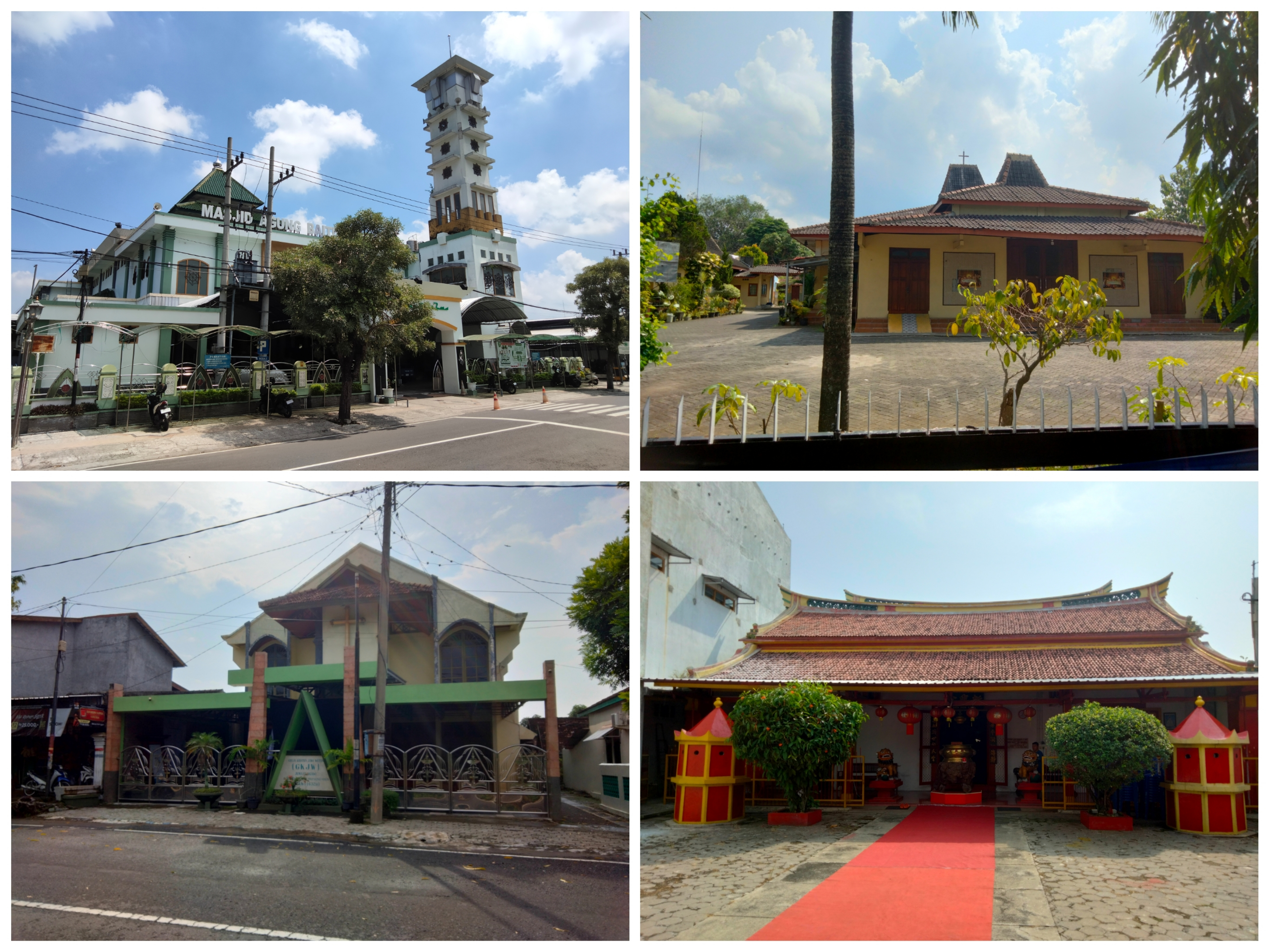
Places of worship in Ngawi city

=== Language ===
Javanese script

The language that is often spoken by the people of Ngawi town is language Indonesia as the official language. Javanese language is the language which is the dominant main language in Ngawi town.

The Mataraman Javanese dialect is a dialect of the Javanese language that is spoken by many people in Ngawi Regency, especially in the Ngawi District area and the former residency areas of Madiun, Kediri and Bojonegoro. The term "Mataraman" refers to a cultural area which includes the west-south part of East Java because of that area was ruled by the Mataram Sultanate in Central Java. This dialect is also spoken by some people in Lamongan, parts of western Malang, parts of western Jombang, and southern parts of Banyuwangi. Based on the results of the 2020 Population Census, the percentage of speakers of the Javanese dialect of Mataramam reaches 34.62% of the total population of East Java as a whole.

The most visible thing about this Javanese dialect is the use of language that still seems subtle compared to other Javanese dialects. In addition, the Mataraman Javanese dialect has differences in intonation with standard Javanese because it often puts stress on the first syllable, for example "Byuh-byuh, uayuné cah iki" ("Wow, this child is beautiful").

The language in the Ngawi city area is not only Javanese, but consists of various languages in Indonesia including Sundanese language, Madura language, Osing language dan Tengger language. The Surabaya Javanese language and the Arekan dialect also have speakers in this district for those who migrate or immigrants who live in the Ngawi District.

=== Culture ===
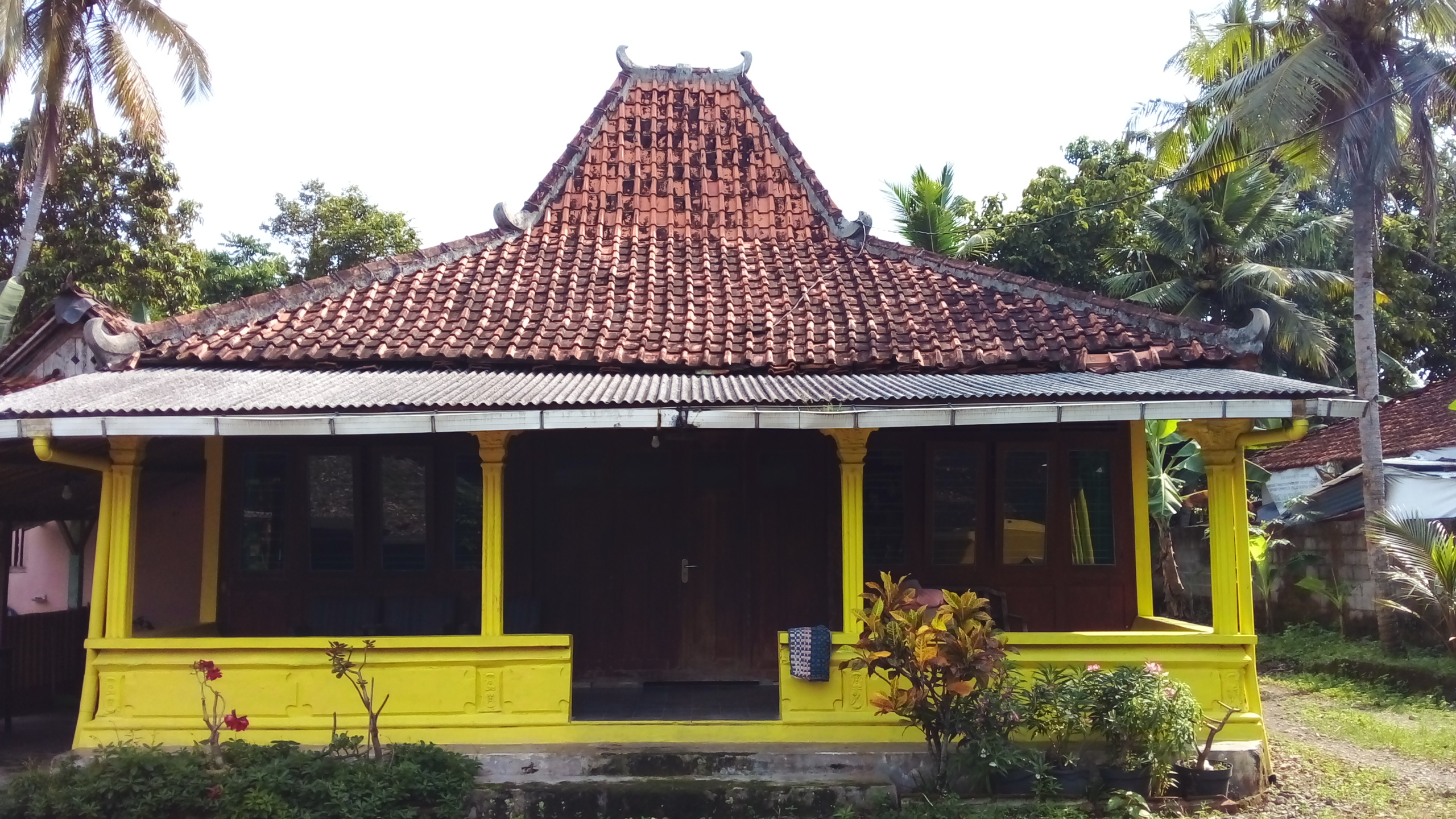
Javanese Traditional House

The original inhabitants or tribes who inhabit Ngawi Regency are Javanese, as well as in the Ngawi sub-district. However, residents from other tribes also live in this sub-district. The Chinese in Ngawi District were immigrants who came from China who came to Ngawi in the pre-independence era of Indonesia. The average settlement of ethnic Chinese people in Ngawi is in the Chinatown village, more precisely in the neighborhood or hamlet of Sidomulyo, Ketangi Ward. The majority of people of Chinese descent in Ngawi work in services, services (including shops) and industry. This district is also the domicile center for all ethnic Chinese people in the Ngawi Regency area. considering the capacity of this district as the capital and economic center of Ngawi Regency. Other ethnic groups in Ngawi District besides the dominant Javanese who live in this district include the Madurese, Osing, Bawean, Tenggerese, Banjar, Samin, Balinese, Sundanese, Aceh, Malays, Dayak, Minahasa, Bugis, Ambon, Batak, Minangkabau, Betawi and some foreigners who are also people of Arab descent and Europeans.

The Javanese are the majority ethnic group or those who dominate the population of the Ngawi District, apart from the Madurese, Tengger, Osing, Sundanese, or tribes outside Java. As with most other Indonesian ethnic groups, the Sundanese are one of them. The Javanese people are part of the Austronesian people whose ancestors are thought to have come from the plains of Taiwan or southern China and migrated via Philippines and Sulawesi first to reach the island of Java between the 15th century BC to the 10th century BC.

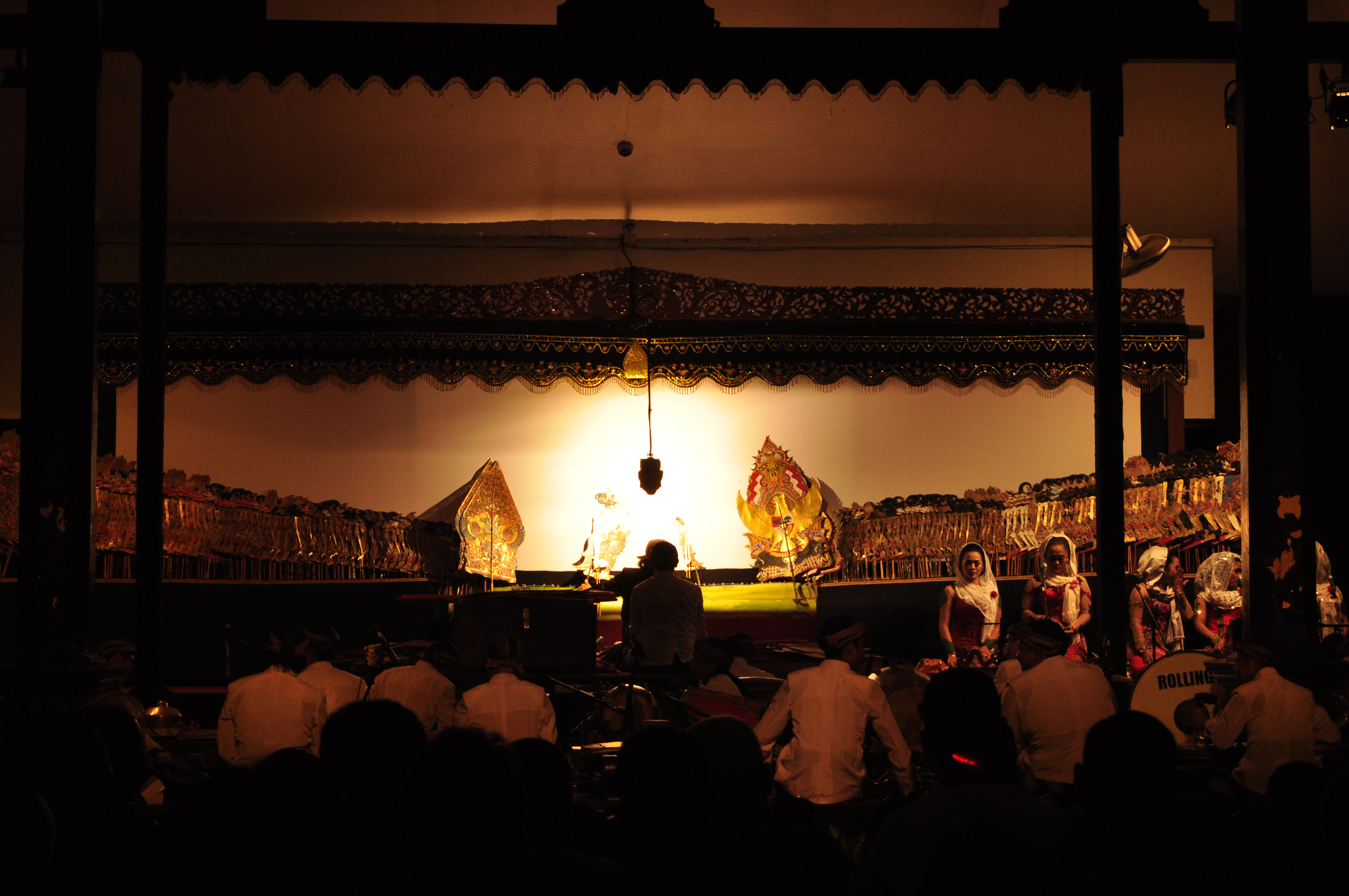
Wayang Kulit, one of the arts in Ngawi

Javanese Culture is a culture that originates from Java and is embraced by the Javanese people, especially in North Banten, North West Java, Central Java, Yogyakarta, and including the East Java region. Javanese culture can be broadly divided into 3, namely the Javanese Kulonan culture (North Banten-North West Java-West Central Java), culture of Central Java (East)-(Yogyakarta), and East Java culture. Javanese culture prioritizes justice, balance, harmony and harmony in everyday life. Javanese culture upholds ethics and social simplicity. Javanese culture besides being found in North Banten, West Java North, Central Java, Yogyakarta, and East Java it is also found in the areas where the Javanese are overseas, namely in Jakarta, Sumatra, and up to the South American continent, namely Suriname. Even Javanese culture itself is one of the Indonesian cultures that are in great demand by foreign countries including Wayang kulit, Keris, Batik, Kebaya, and Gamelan.

=== Traditional dances ===
Orek-Orek is a traditional Indonesian dance originating from the Ngawi Regency, especially in the Ngawi District. This dance was popular in 1980, usually performed when an event or celebration is held and in almost every event the Orek-Orek Dance contains dynamic movements and is carried out by pairs of young people numbering four to ten people. It has existed since the Dutch colonial era.

During the Dutch colonial era, the Dutch said that their celebrations looked messy maybe this is because the workers come from various regions, so that their dance has its own uniqueness – each and every word "morak-marik" or "urak-arik" then many people call it "orek-orek".

This orek-orek dance depicts the excitement of the young people after doing the "Rodi" work ordered by the Dutch Government at that time the Ngawi Youth were forced to build a trans Java road from Ayer to Panarukan not only the Ngawi Youth were forced to do forced labor, but also many young people from other areas, after work they perform various performances, such as playing Ketoprak, Ludruk and they danced this dance together as entertainment to unwind after work.

==== History of Orek-orek ====
The Orek-orek dance is a typical dance of the Ngawi District, especially the Ngawi Regency area. The Orek-Orek Dance was created as a substitute for the Orek-Orek cultural art which has become extinct because there are no devotees. Orek-Orek art is not dance art but drama art as well as theater. Mrs. Sri Widajati is an artist who comes from the District of Ngawi, Regency of Ngawi. She was the initiator of the Orek-orek dance, which at that time collaborated with the Government of Ngawi Regency to create a dance typical of the region. In creating the Orek-Orek Dance, Mrs. Sri Widajati took two elements from the Orek-Orek art, namely the Orek-Orek Gending and the lyrics of the Orek-Orek song. The movement of the Orek-Orek Dance is taken from the history of the Orek-Orek art, which is about workers building dams and bridges during the Dutch colonial period. The Orek-Orek dance uses slendro tunings. The Orek-Orek dance consists of dynamic movements and songs accompanied by music. The dancers in the Orek-Orek Dance consist of men and women in pairs, which can be performed by a pair or several pairs of people. This art is called Orek-Orek for three reasons, namely this art form is messy or has various patterns, this art uses the accompaniment of Gending Orek-Orek with the faces of the performers crossed out using charcoal.

The art of Orek-Orek was revived by a Ngawi resident, namely Mrs. Sri Widajati with different results. This was done with the aim of attracting the younger generation to improve their arts, especially in the field of dance. to revive the art of Orek-Orek in the form of dance. In 1981 Orek-Orek dance began to be developed by the local community in the form of a male and female pair dance which lasted about 8 minutes, and then the Orek-Orek dance movements were patented into 18 variations of motion.

The accompaniment used is the Orek-Orek music which existed before the Orek-Orek dance was created. Mrs. Sri, as the creator of the Orek-Orek dance, opened a dance studio called Sri Budaya as a forum for community art. Since 1981 until now, the Orek-Orek dance has undergone developments, namely changes in the form of the choreography which are not only danced by pairs, but can be danced singly. In that year, the government began to make the Orek-Orek dance the icon of the Ngawi District, especially the area above it, namely the Ngawi Regency, because at that time the Ngawi District did not have dances except for the Orek-Orek dance. On the other hand, the Orek-Orek dance has movements that are easy to learn, so that the dance is appointed as a typical dance of the Ngawi District. Then the policy of the Ngawi Regency Government, especially the Ngawi District, is increasingly making efforts to preserve the orek-orek dance, such as training the orek-orek dance for teachers throughout Ngawi.

Every movement of the Orek-Orek dance has a symbolic meaning contained in it, such as the costumes and movements that depict a hard worker. Apart from having a symbolic meaning, the Orek-Orek dance also has values contained in it, such as religious values (praying and asking God), moral values (seriousness in work), these are the main reasons for Ibu Sri to preserve the Orek-Orek dance. ork.

== Infrastructure ==
Ngawi town also has a number of infrastructures, starting from the outer ring road, toll roads and green open spaces built in urban areas. The Government of Ngawi Regency, especially the PUPR Service, built the southern ring road in 1997 to reduce the number of large vehicles passing in the city which can lead to traffic jams and damaged roads There is a plan to build a northern ring road that passes outside the city, namely Pitu District and Kasreman District to build the economy of residents around the District of Ngawi in the north. Ngawi-Kertosono and Solo-Ngawi toll roads also have toll gates within the city. The purpose of building a toll gate in the Ngawi District is to be able to drive the economy of the people of Ngawi Regency, especially the Ngawi District.

There are also green open parks created in urban areas to serve as tourist attractions for local residents and residents outside the city. Construction of multi-storey buildings began to spread in this area, one of which is the construction of hotels and shopping centers. To accommodate the needs of pedestrians and tourists, the Ngawi Regency government, especially the Ngawi District, built bicycle paths on a number of main roads in Ngawi, as well as pedestrian paths that are almost evenly distributed throughout the Ngawi region.

== Transportation ==
=== Highway ===
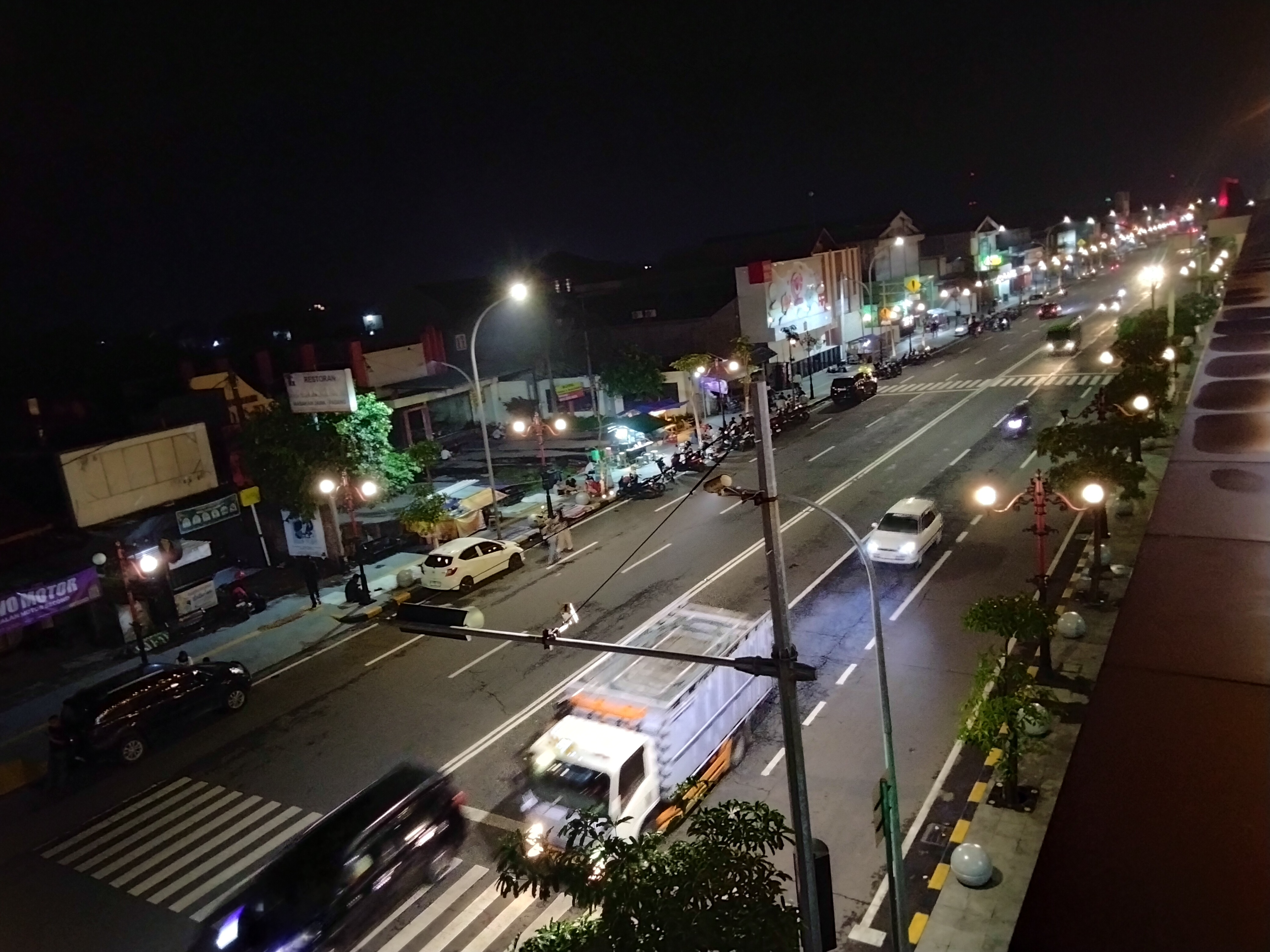
Main road in Ngawi

Ngawi passed by Indonesian National Route 17 and Indonesian National Route 30. The highway intersection is located right in the city of Ngawi, namely at the Kartonyono intersection and the Karangasri intersection, so that in its development, the City of Ngawi is always crowded with various vehicles. Not only that, there are also roads between districts that are connected to each other. Inter-district roads in question are:

- Ngawi–Pitu Highway
- Ngawi–Paron Highway
- Ngawi–Jogorogo Highway
- Ngawi–Pangkur Highway
- Ngawi–Kwadungan Highway

=== Passenger ===
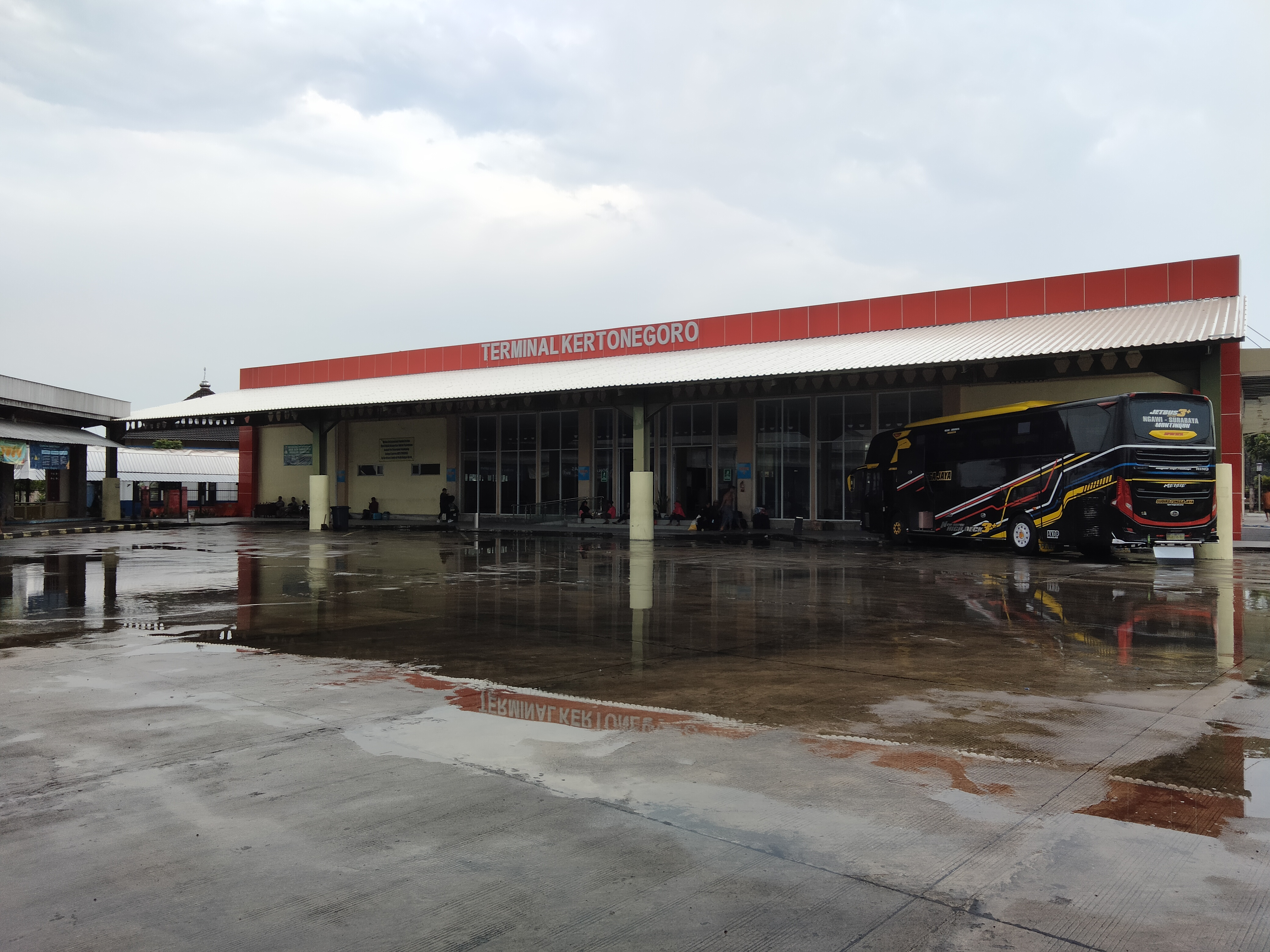
Kertonegoro bus station

Even though the City of Ngawi is not crossed by a railway line for the southern route of Java, Ngawi also has a bus station which is also used as a boarding and alighting point for passengers who will be traveling to and from Ngawi town District. The Kertonegoro bus station is also the only terminal in the Ngawi town area, so that with supporting facilities such as this terminal, passengers do not have to struggle to find the bus to board. The modes of public transportation available at the Kertonegoro bus station include:

- City transport
- Village transport
- Medium bus(Routes within the Ngawi Regency/Routes within the East Java Province)
- Big bus(Routes within the East Java/Cross-city routes across provinces)

=== Other public transportation ===
In-city transportation in the Ngawi District is also served by online taxis (Grab Car and Go Car), conventional taxis, online taxis Grab and Go Ride, rickshaws, motorbike rickshaws as well as several car rental services available in the district as another option for traveling around the town of Ngawi.

=== Toll road ===
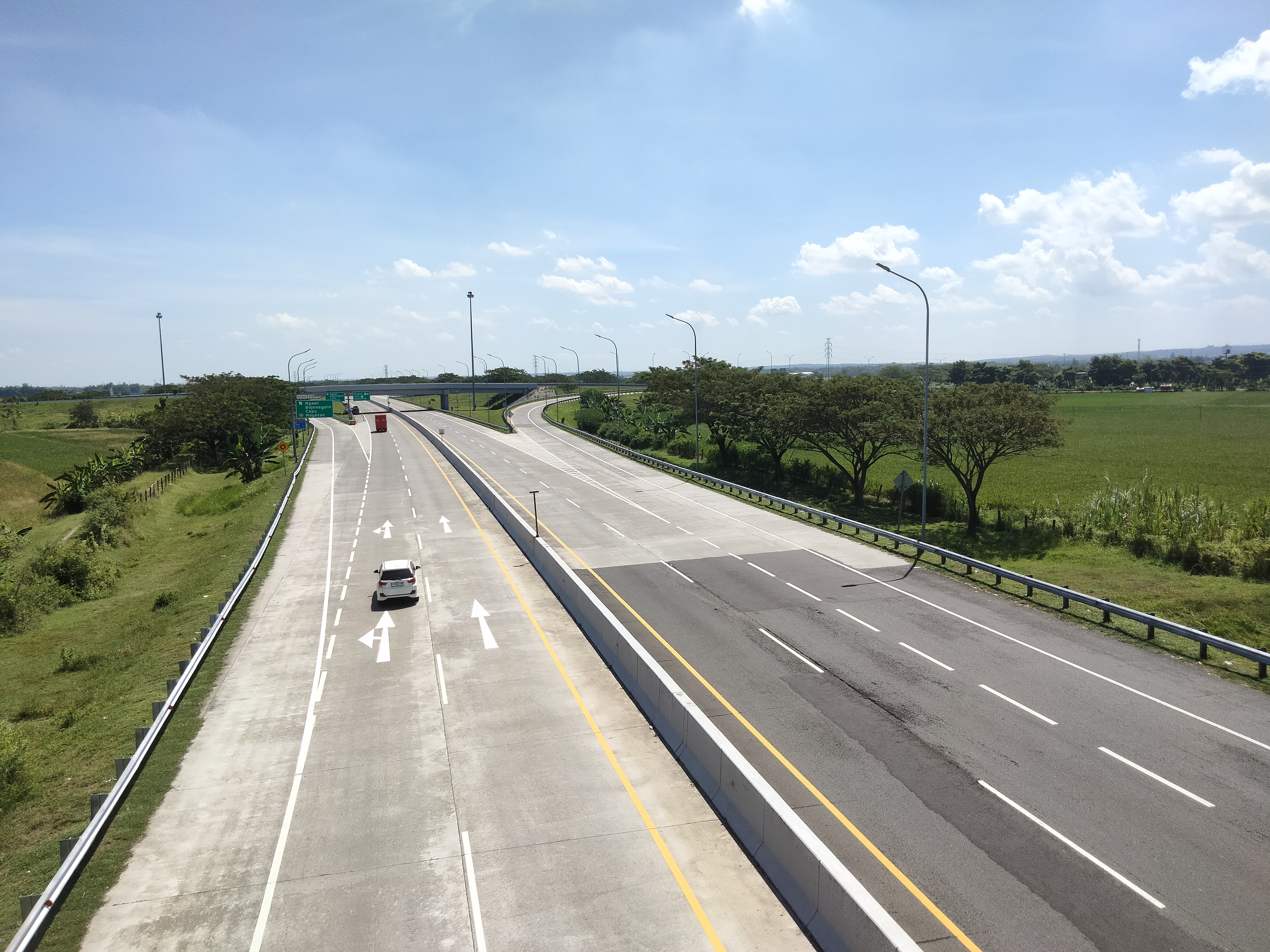
Ngawi–Solo Toll road

The city of Ngawi is also an area crossed by the Trans Java Toll Road, the toll road that connects Jakarta and Surabaya. And enter the Solo-Kertosono Toll Road. The details of the distribution are that on the west side there is the Solo–Ngawi Toll Road, while on the east side there is the Ngawi–Kertosono Toll Road, which is parallel to the southern Java railroad. The Ngawi Toll Gates is the only access for vehicles going to/from Ngawi City.

== Sports ==
Sports that are developing in Ngawi City include football, basketball, badminton, tennis, volleyball, swimming, and so on. Ngawi has a stadium, the Ketonggo Stadium. Ngawi also has a sports hall or abbreviated (GOR) even though it is located outside the Ngawi District of the city area, including the Klithic village area, Geneng District. however, almost all sports activities in the town are centered in the building.

== Health ==
The town of Ngawi has hospitals managed by various parties, both the local government and the private sector. Hospitals in Ngawi Regency are also concentrated in the Ngawi District. There are two Community Health Centers (Puskesmas) in Ngawi, namely the Ngawi Health Center and the Ngawi Ancient Health Center. There are also three supporting health centers (Pustu) in the Ngawi District, the authority of which is under the two Puskesmas in Ngawi town. At several points in Ngawi there are also several herbal and traditional medicine clinics for treatment with natural ingredients.

=== Hospitals ===
The following are the names of hospitals in Ngawi:

- Dr Soeroto Hospital
- Widodo Hospital
- At-Tin Husada Islamic Hospital

== Education ==
=== Elementary schools ===
In general, the education sector in Ngawi town is still dominated by public schools, especially at the elementary level. Public elementary school are spread across all districts and villages through the president instruction elementary school (SD Inpres) program, but among these public schools there are a few private elementary school. The total number of public and private primary schools in Ngawi City reaches thirty-six buildings.
Meanwhile, there are eight school buildings in total for Islamic elementary school in Ngawi District.
The following are the names of elementary schools in Ngawi town District:

- Banyuurip Public Elementary School
- Beran 4 Public Elementary School
- Beran 5 Public Elementary School
- Beran 6 Public Elementary School
- Grudo 3 Public Elementary School
- Grudo 4 Public Elementary School
- Jururejo 2 Public Elementary School
- Kandangan 1 Public Elementary School
- Kandangan 3 Public Elementary School
- Karang Asri 1 Public Elementary School
- Karang Asri 3 Public Elementary School
- Karangtengah Town 1 Public Elementary School
- Karangtengah Town 4 Public Elementary School
- Karangtengah Prandon 1 Public Elementary School
- Karangtengah Prandon 2 Public Elementary School
- Kartoharjo 3 Public Elementary School
- Kerek Public Elementary School
- Ketanggi 2 Public Elementary School
- Mangunharjo 1 Public Elementary School
- Mangunharjo 2 Public Elementary School
- Mangunharjo 3 Public Elementary School
- Mangunharjo 4 Public Elementary School
- Margomulyo 1 Public Elementary School
- Margomulyo 2 Public Elementary School
- Ngawi 1 Public Elementary School
- Ngawi 2 Public Elementary School
- Pelem 1 Public Elementary School
- Pelem 2 Public Elementary School
- Watualang 1 Public Elementary School
- Watualang 2 Public Elementary School
- Watualang 3 Public Elementary School
- Saint Joseph Chatolic Elementary School
- Muhammadiyah 1 Elementary School
- Islam Al Qolam Elementary School
- Luqman Al-Hakim Elementary School
- Harapan Ummat Elementary School (SDIT)

And here are some names of Islamic elementary school (Madrasa) in the Ngawi district of the city:

- Tahfidz Madinatul Huffadz elementary school
- Ngawi 6 Islamic elementary school
- Al Falah Beran Islamic elementary school
- Al Hijrah 1 Islamic elementary school
- An Noor Karang Asri Islamic elementary school
- Budi Mulia Islamic elementary school
- PSM Watualang Islamic elementary school
- Muhammadiyah Kartoharjo Islamic elementary school

=== Junior high schools ===
Meanwhile, public junior high schools in Ngawi town are dominated by private schools, with a total of eight school buildings. However, the number of public junior high schools in the town is almost even, with six public schools. Apart from that there are also two Islamic junior high school in the town.
The following are some names of junior high schools in the town area:

- Ngawi 1 Public Junior High School
- Ngawi 2 Public Junior High School
- Ngawi 3 Public Junior High School
- Ngawi 4 Public Junior High School
- Ngawi 5 Public Junior High School
- Ngawi 6 Public Junior High School
- Luqman Al-Hakim Junior High School
- Ma'arif Junior High School
- Ngawi 5 Muhammadiyah Junior High School
- Syafaatul Ulum Junior High School
- TahFizh Al Qolam Junior High School
- Wahidiyah Junior High School
- Islam Al-Hijrah Junior High School
- Harapan Ummat Junior High School

Islamic Junior High School (Madrasa) in the Ngawi district of the city:

- Ngawi 3 Public Islamic Junior High School
- PSA An-Noor Islamic Junior High School

=== Senior high schools/vocational high schools ===
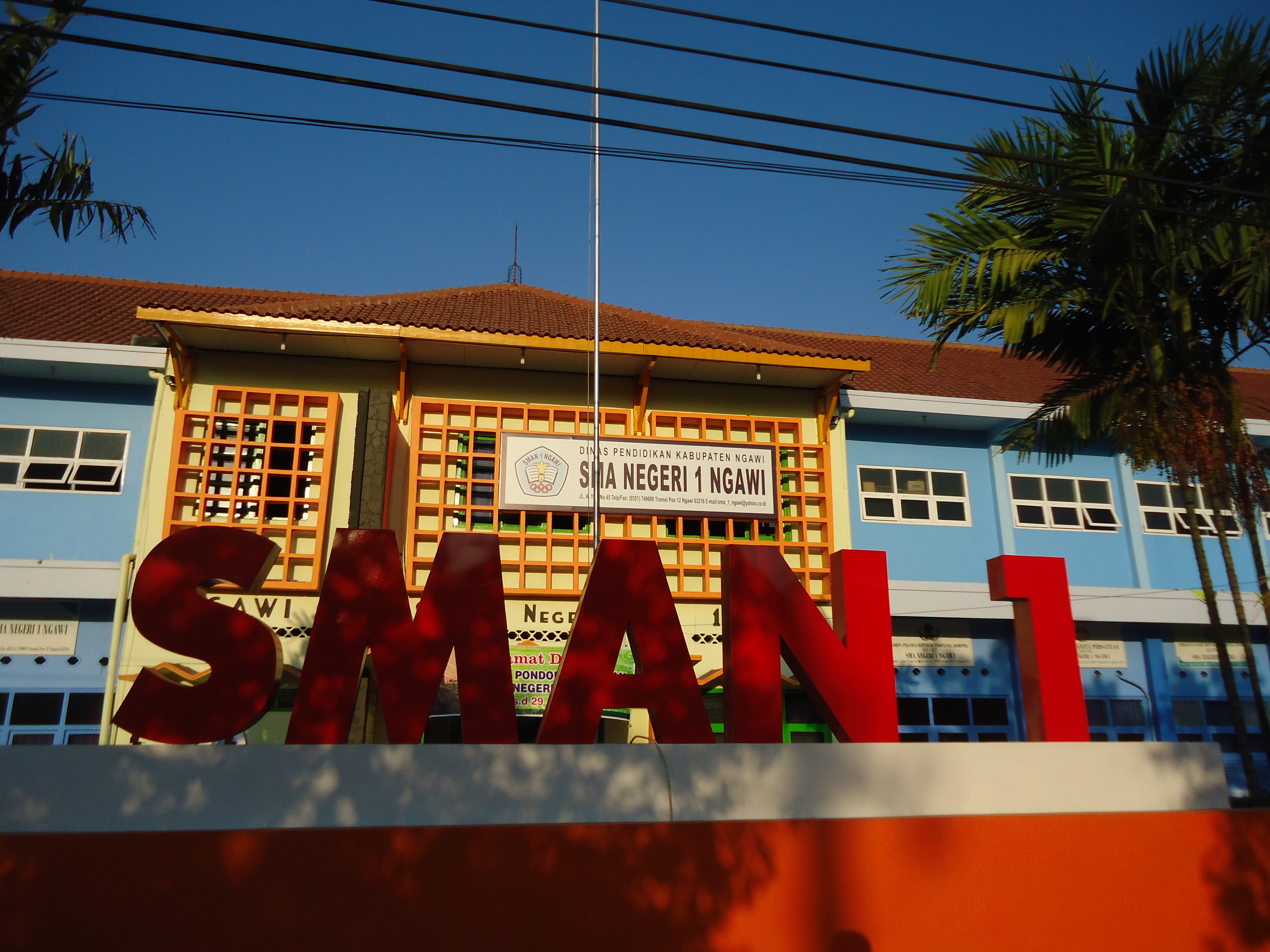
Ngawi 1 Public Senior High School

The only senior high school in the Ngawi City area is Ngawi 1 Public Senior High School (SMA Negeri 1 Ngawi), while Ngawi 2 Public Senior High School (SMA Negeri 2 Ngawi), although it uses the name Ngawi town District, is located in Geneng District. Senior High Schools in Ngawi City are dominated by private schools, with up to three buildings. The total number of public and private high schools in Ngawi City is four buildings. There are twice as many Vocational Schools in Ngawi City as Senior High Schools. The number of Honesty Middle School buildings in Ngawi City reaches eight buildings, consisting of two state schools namely Ngawi 1 Vocational High School (SMKN 1 Ngawi), Ngawi 2 Vocational High School (SMKN 2 Ngawi) and six private schools. Apart from that, there are also two Islamic senior high school in the Ngawi sub-district of the city.
The following is a list of high school names and vocational in Ngawi City:

- Ngawi 1 Public Senior High School
- Karya Pembangunan Senior High School
- Ma'arif Senior High School
- Muhammadiyah 1 Ngawi Senior High School
- Ngawi 1 Public Vocational High School
- Ngawi 2 Public Vocational High School
- PGRI 1 Vocational High School
- Modern Vocational High School
- 10 November Vocational High School
- Muhammadiyah 1 Ngawi Vocational High School
- Rahani Husada Health Vocational High School
- Trisakti Vocational High School

Islamic Senior High School (Madrasa) in the Ngawi district of the city:

- Ngawi 1 Public Islamic Senior High School
- Al-Hijrah Islamic Senior High School

=== College ===
Most students in the Ngawi City area continue their tertiary education outside the city such as Surabaya, Yogyakarta, Surakarta, Semarang, Jakarta, Bandung, Malang and Bogor. This student from Ngawi Regency is a member of the FORSMAWI INDONESIA organization. Who has activities in the field of education and social. Even so, there are also universities in Ngawi. There are only a few tertiary schools in Ngawi, only five campus. Among them are the:

- Soerjo University
- Open University
- Modern College of Teacher Training and Education (STKIP Modern)
- Nursing Academy (Akper) and
- Islamic Religious Institute (STAI Ngawi) which has now changed its name to (IAI Ngawi).

== Economy ==
Luwes Departemen store Ngawi

=== Modern markets ===
Ngawi also has shopping centers ranging from modern shopping centers (malls/supermarkets), wholesale centers, and traditional ones. Ngawi has two modern shopping centers.

=== Traditional and animal markets ===
In addition, Ngawi also has several traditional markets and animal markets, namely the Ngawi Big Market, Beran Market, Grudo Market, Krempyeng (Watualang) Market, Brangetan Market or ancient Ngawi. There are two animal markets in the town, namely the Legi animal market and a flea market located in Kandangan Village and the Koplakan Chicken Market in the Karangtengah Town ward.

=== Industrial areas ===
Residents in Ngawi also work in the services, industry and trade sectors. Ngawi is the center of trade and business in Ngawi Regency which is experiencing rapid development. Large and medium industries include: Dwi Prima Sentosa, Wilmar group, Shou Lang Lastindo, Surya Bambu Timur industrial, etc.

== Tourism ==
=== Fort Van den Bosch ===
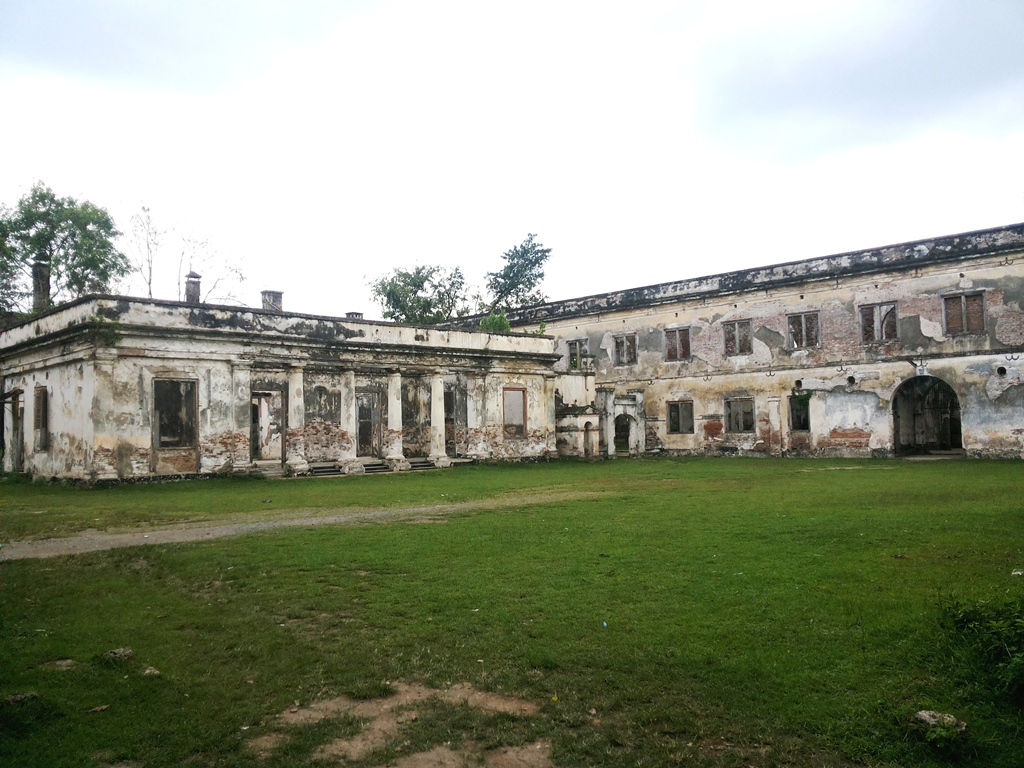
Fort van den Bosch

Fort van den Bosch located in Pelem ward, northeastern part of the town, near the mouths of the Solo River and Madiun River, built by the Dutch government in 1839–1845 by Johannes van den Bosch. This fort is often called "Fort Pendem" This fort is 165 by 80 metres (541 by 262 ft) with a land area of 15 hectares (37 acres). It is 1.5 kilometres (0.93 mi) northeast of Ngawi.

The location of the fort is strategic because it is near the mouth of the Madiun River which empties into the Solo River. This fort was deliberately made lower than the surrounding land surrounded by high ground so that it looks hidden from the outside.

The location of Fort Van Den Bosch was deliberately made low from the higher surrounding land so that it was hidden and fulfilled the ideal elements for a defensive fortress. However, with the greatness of the Dutch architect at that time in designing the drainage channels, even though the position was lower than the surrounding land, the location of the fort was able to avoid flooding. Therefore, the Van Den Bosch Fort is also known as the pendem fort by a number of people in Ngawi because of its hidden location.

=== Ngawioboro Street ===
Ngawioboro Street

Ngawioboro Street is part of a pedestrian walkway from the Ivory Monumen Kartonyono intersection in the south to Ngawi Regency Square in the north. Ngawioboro Street adopts the style of Malioboro Street which is located in the city of Yogyakarta, with wide pedestrian paths. The location of Ngawioboro Street is along Yos Sudarso Street on the west side.

The government changed the face of the sidewalks along Yos Sudarso street which used to be just an ordinary protocol road, but were changed in such a way as to form a town pedestrian area. Now many local residents call it "Ngawioboro Street" or "the Malioboro" of Ngawi town.

=== Candi Park ===
The temple park is a tourist and play park located near the dead river or the indentation of the Madiun River which has the form of a small lake. This park is located in Ketanggi Hamlets, Kartoharjo Village, Ngawi town District.

The view that can be seen from the entrance to the park is the Dead River or the Madiun River basin. The Candi garden is on the banks of the Madiun Bengawan which is no longer the main stream so the water looks calm. The river in the Temple Park area is the result of the normalization of the Madiun River watershed which was carried out in 1971.

Inside the dead river there are also fresh water fish which are the main entertainment for tourists provided for fishing spots. However, visitors are only allowed to catch fish by fishing. The regulation is based on Regional Regulation of Ngawi Regency No. 15 of 2016 concerning Green Open Spaces and Regional Regulation of Ngawi Regency No. 1 of 2017 on Convenience and Public order. Apart from that, there is also a boat, namely a duck boat that tourists can rent to get around in the Kali Mati area of the candi garden.

Even though this location is named Candi Park, it does not mean that there is a temple in the park. Candi is the name of the hamlet where the park is located, namely Candi Hamlet, Kartoharjo Village. In the garden there are various ornamental plants and trees. The park road has been repaired so that it can make it comfortable for tourists who are walking around in the park.

=== Dungus Park ===
Dungus Park is a green open park where there is a statue of a farmer with two buffaloes 7 meters high in the middle of the park and surrounded by a fountain. The statue has the meaning of Ngawi, as one of the rice granaries in East Java where the people are predominantly farmers.

This tourist park has a high philosophy in the eastern part of Ngawi town. The location is quite close to the Kartonyono gold ivory monument, the crossroads of the Ngawi axis. From the Tugu Kartonyono location, head east for about 1 km. On the front there is the inscription Taman Dungus which corresponds to the name of the administrative location, namely in Dungus Hamlet, Karang Asri Village. Dungus Park is not far from the banks of the Madiun River, which is about 150 meters to the northeast.

The area was once a barren field, only grass adorned the garden. Not infrequently the residents' livestock were seen in this field before, such as cows, goats, buffalo and sheep. Now this park is a destination for tourists and travelers. This new tourist destination in Ngawi, which is one kilometre from the town center, was inaugurated on 7 December 2019, by the Regent of Ngawi.

=== Kepatihan Ngawi Build ===
The old kepatihan itself is an old building located in the District of Ngawi town. Precisely on Patiunus street, Ketangi Village, Ngawi District. This building has a great history for the district or even for Ngawi Regency. The reason is that this building used to be the governor's office that once existed in the Ngawi region. Even the hero HOS Cokroaminoto, a Javanese king without a crown, once worked here as a clerk. He left because he saw the Dutch's injustice to the natives. Until now this building has undergone renovations so that it becomes one of the Tourist Attractions in the Ngawi town District area.

Kepatihan Ngawi is one of the cultural attractions in Ngawi which is located in the ex-Kepatihan on Jalan Patiunus, Ketangi Urban village, Ngawi District, Ngawi. This building includes the legacy of Patih Pringgokusumo, an important figure in the history of the Duchy of Ngawi. The Joglo house and 2 hectares of land belong to the Ngawi regional government which it is hoped will become one of the heritage areas in Indonesia. This kepatihan includes buildings from the past that have high historical value in defending Ngawi during the Dutch colonial period.

=== Bukit Kerek Indah ===
Ngawi district also has other tourist rides. One of them is Kerek Bukit Indah which is located in the Napel hamlet area, Kerek Village. Although the location of this attraction is on the outskirts of the town near the border, but this tour can also be a reference or natural tourist destination in the Ngawi District.

The tourist bridge on Bukit Kerek Indah Ngawi, precisely in Napel hamlet, Kerek village, Ngawi District, is a tourist destination built by local residents. This started when a group of villagers wanted to develop the tourism sector in their area.

The bridge with a height of 20 meters above the Kendeng Mountains was built independently by residents of Napel Hamlet, Kerek Village. The bridge building was built using bamboo and has a concrete foundation, This bridge has become a tourist destination for tourists from within the country to foreign tourists. On average, tourists come just to enjoy the view of the sky of the town of Ngawi from a high hill.

=== Ngawi Square ===
Ngawi Square is an alun-alun (an area of common, lawn land) with an area of 68,310 square meters. It has several sporting facilities.

Design of Ngawi Square resembling a symmetrical axis is a Javanese order concept, among others, Catur Gatra is the regency seat of Ngawi Regency, Correctional Institution or abbreviated (Lapas), Grand Mosque, the Regional People's Representative Council building, Makodim and other district agencies and the Alun-alun are adjacent to each other and surround the quadrilateral of the Alun-alun.

== Cuisine ==
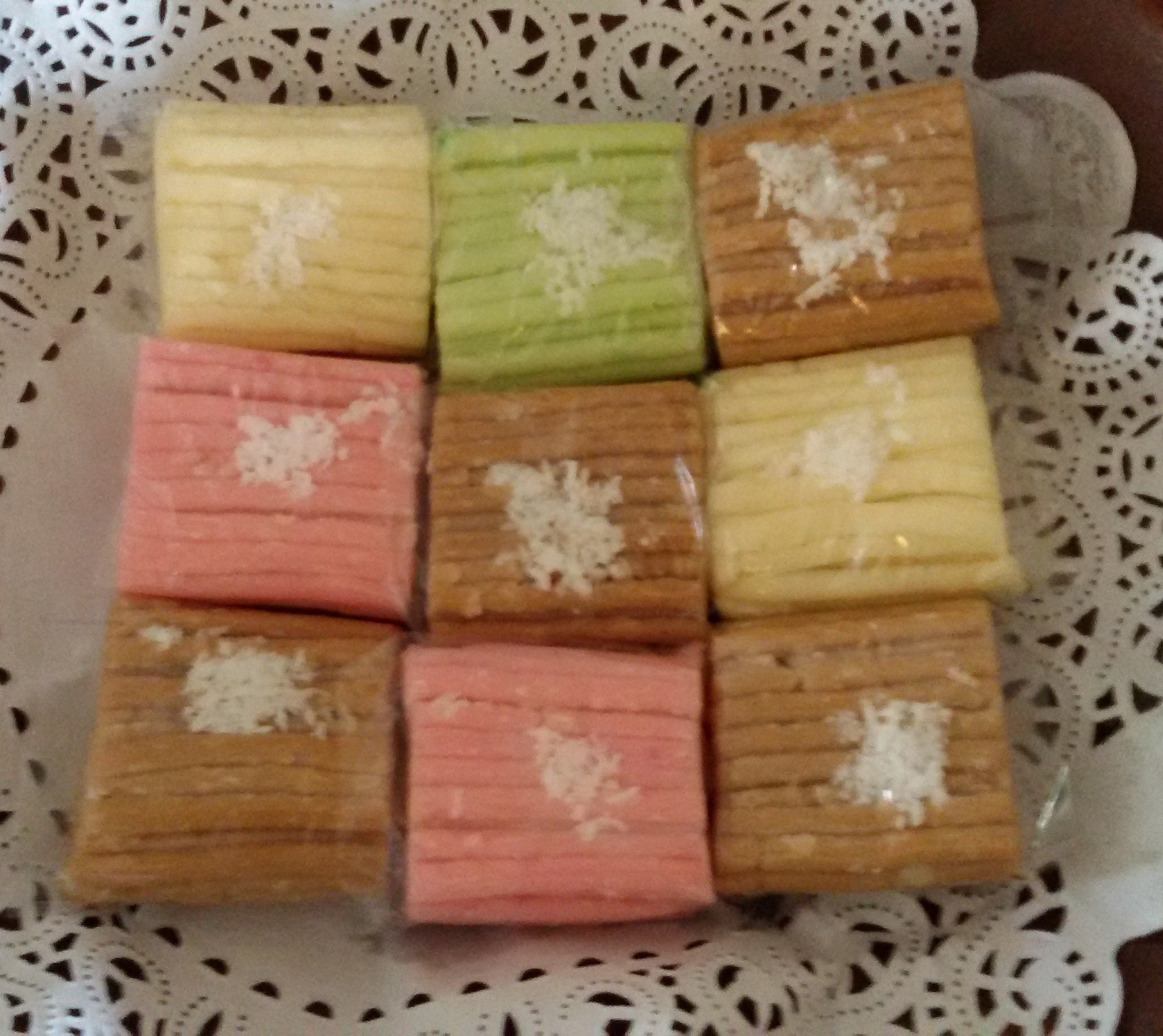
Gethuk lindri

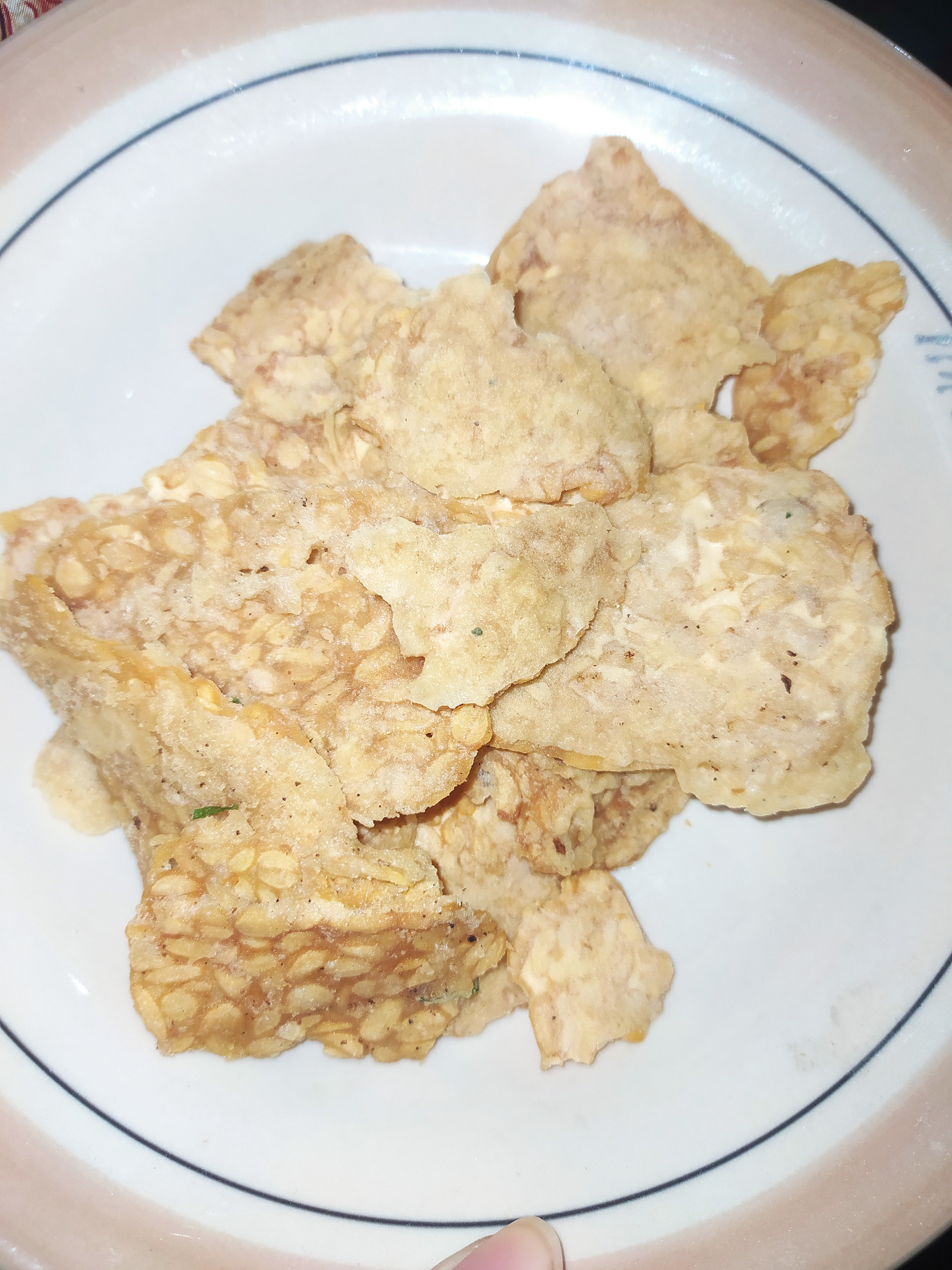
Tempeh chips, Ngawi typical culinary

The city of Ngawi has a variety of culinary delights, from food to drinks.

=== Foods ===
- Tepo tofu was first made by Mr. Palio. This food is made of rice cake, fried tofu, peanuts, bean sprouts, chili as a spicy taste, melted sweet soy sauce and fried chicken eggs, sprinkled with a topping of fried onions on top.
- Pecel rice native to Ngawi which tastes different from pecel rice from other regions, pecel sauce that is not finely ground like pecel sauce outside of Ngawi. This type of chili certainly has a unique taste.
- Lethok is one of the chili-based foods that use the basic ingredients of tempeh. To make this food, other additional ingredients are needed such as tofu, sliced meat as a complement, red chili and cayenne pepper, shallots and white onions, aromatic ginger, galangal, kaffir lime leaves as flavoring, thick coconut milk, cooking oil which is then for frying (by roasting) lethok seasoning before processing, salt and flavoring to give lethok a taste.

=== Drinks ===
- Cemue is a typical Ngawi hot drink (wedang) made of sliced bread, roasted peanuts, coconut milk, ginger juice and fried onion topping.
- Wedang Ronde is one type of warm drink which is the typical drink of this city. Even though it is often found in other regions, the typical Ngawi wedang ronde has a different taste from the wedang ronde found in other regions. To make this drink, you need ginger boiled water mixed with tea and honey and then given round sticky rice balls.
- Dawet Kemangi is a Javanese drink made from brown sugar water, coconut milk, cendol, grass jelly, and basil seeds. This type of drink is often found in other areas, including one in this district. This drink is usually sold in stalls, traditional markets and in restaurants.

=== Snacks ===
- Gethuk lindri is one of the specialties of Ngawi, the taste of gethuk in Ngawi is different from gethuk in other regions, these traditional snacks are widely available and sold in traditional markets. This snack is made from cassava, grated coconut, vanilla, food coloring and granulated sugar which is printed using a grinding machine.
- Tempeh chips which are now "a typical Ngawi food icon". Tempeh chips are generally produced in the Ngawi region, the eastern city, especially in the Sadang Hamlet, Ngawi Village and Karangtengah Prandon Village. All other culinary specialties of the City of Ngawi can be found at the nearest stalls, restaurants, traveling vendors and at a number of angkringan in the city of Ngawi. This snack is made from the main ingredient of thinly sliced tempeh and covered with rice flour dough that has been seasoned.
- Sticky rice crust (intip ketan) is unique to the Ngawi District. This is made of sticky rice or glutinous rice which is burnt or hardened on the outer layer to form a peep in Javanese which means the rice hardens or dries at the bottom of the pot. The way to make it is fairly easy, namely by preparing ingredients in the form of glutinous rice, grated coconut, sugar, salt and coconut milk.

== See also ==
- Ngawi
- Java
- Indonesia
- List of regencies and cities of Indonesia
