= Jalan Yos Sudarso =

Road in Ngawi, Indonesia

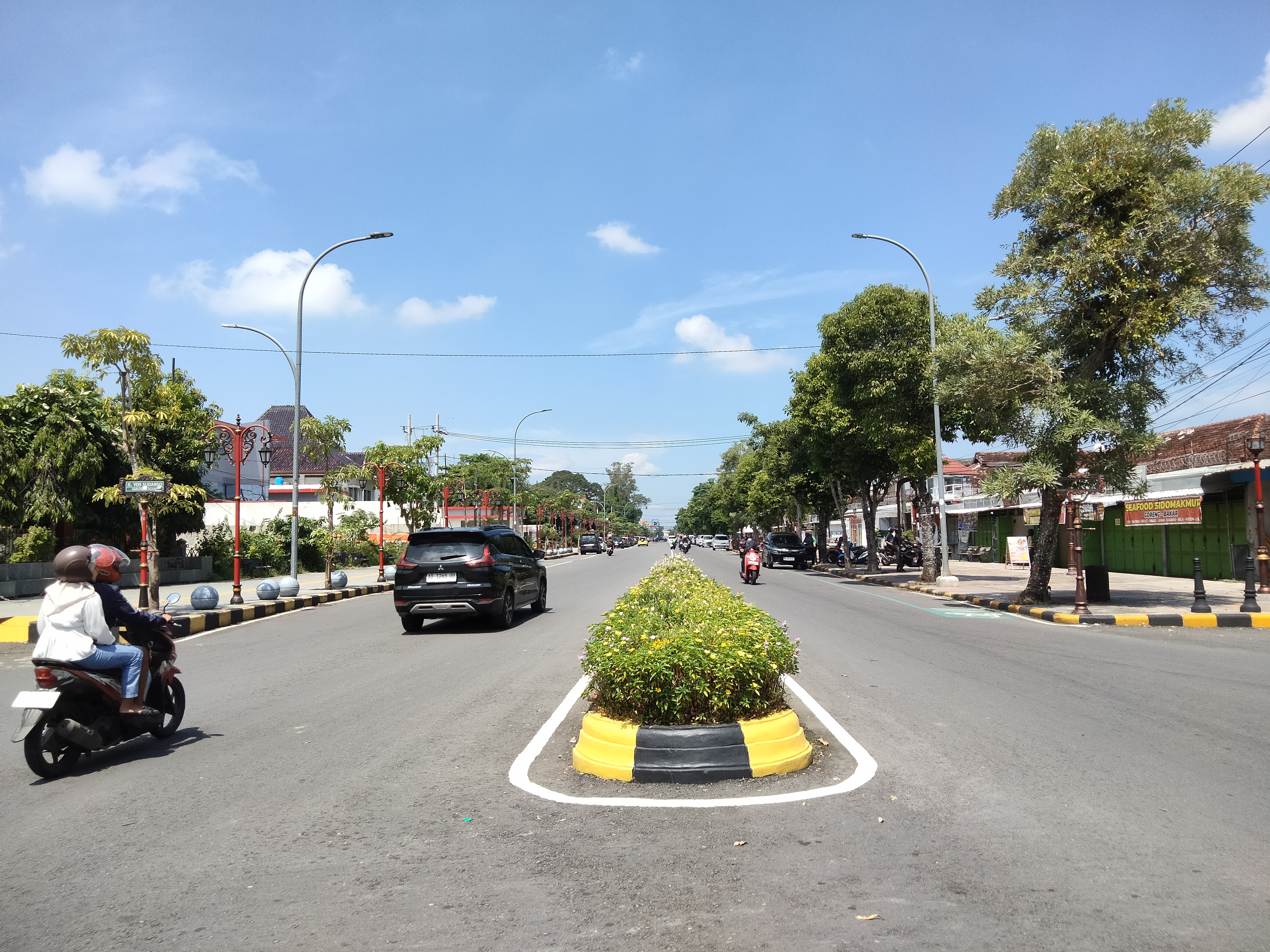
- Yos Sudarso street, main road of Ngawi
- Interactive map of Jalan Yos Sudarso
- Owner: Ngawi Regency Government
- Maintained by: Public Works Agency (Dinas Bina Marga) of Ngawi Regency
- Length: 750 m (2,460 ft)
- Location: Margomulyo, Ngawi
- Coordinates: 7.4074°S 111.4439°E
- South end: Kartonyono monument
- North end: Alun-alun Merdeka Ngawi (Ngawi Square)

Jalan Yos Sudarso (Javanese: ꦢꦭꦤ꧀ꦪꦺꦴꦱ꧀ꦱꦸꦢꦂꦱꦺꦴ, romanized: Dalan Yos Sudarso, lit. 'Yos Sudarso Avenue') is a protocol road in the Ngawi region which is also the business center of Ngawi city and Ngawi Regency. This road is named after the national hero Yos Sudarso. This road stretches from the Kartonyono monument in the south to the green bamboo monument near the gate of the Ngawi Merdeka Square in the north along 750 m.

This protocol road area also has a tourist pedestrian path Ngawioboro Street Center so that this road becomes a tourist attraction every day in Ngawi Regency.

== Intersection ==
- Kartonyono
- Margomulyo
- South Alun-alun Ngawi (Ngawi Square)

== Controversy ==
As the number of vehicles passing through Yos Sudarso Street increases, a problem that can often cause congestion on this main road is the misalignment of bicycle lanes and parking spaces for four-wheeled vehicles and larger. The Ngawi Regency Government has coordinated with relevant agencies to address this issue by installing special markings for four-wheeled and larger vehicle parking on the east side of the road and installing special markings to separate the bicycle lane on the west side of the road.
