= Madiun River =

River in Indonesia

Madiun River Kali Bengawan Madioen, Kali Madioen
- Location of the mouth Madiun River (Indonesia)
- Native name: Bengawan Madiun (Indonesian); Kali Madiun (Indonesian)

Location
- Country: Indonesia
- State: East Java; Ngawi
- City: Madiun (city); Ngawi (city)

Physical characteristics
- Source confluence: Some tributaries
  - location: Sawoo, Ponorogo
- Mouth: Solo River
  - location: Ngawi (city)
  - coordinates: 7°23′17″S 111°27′28″E

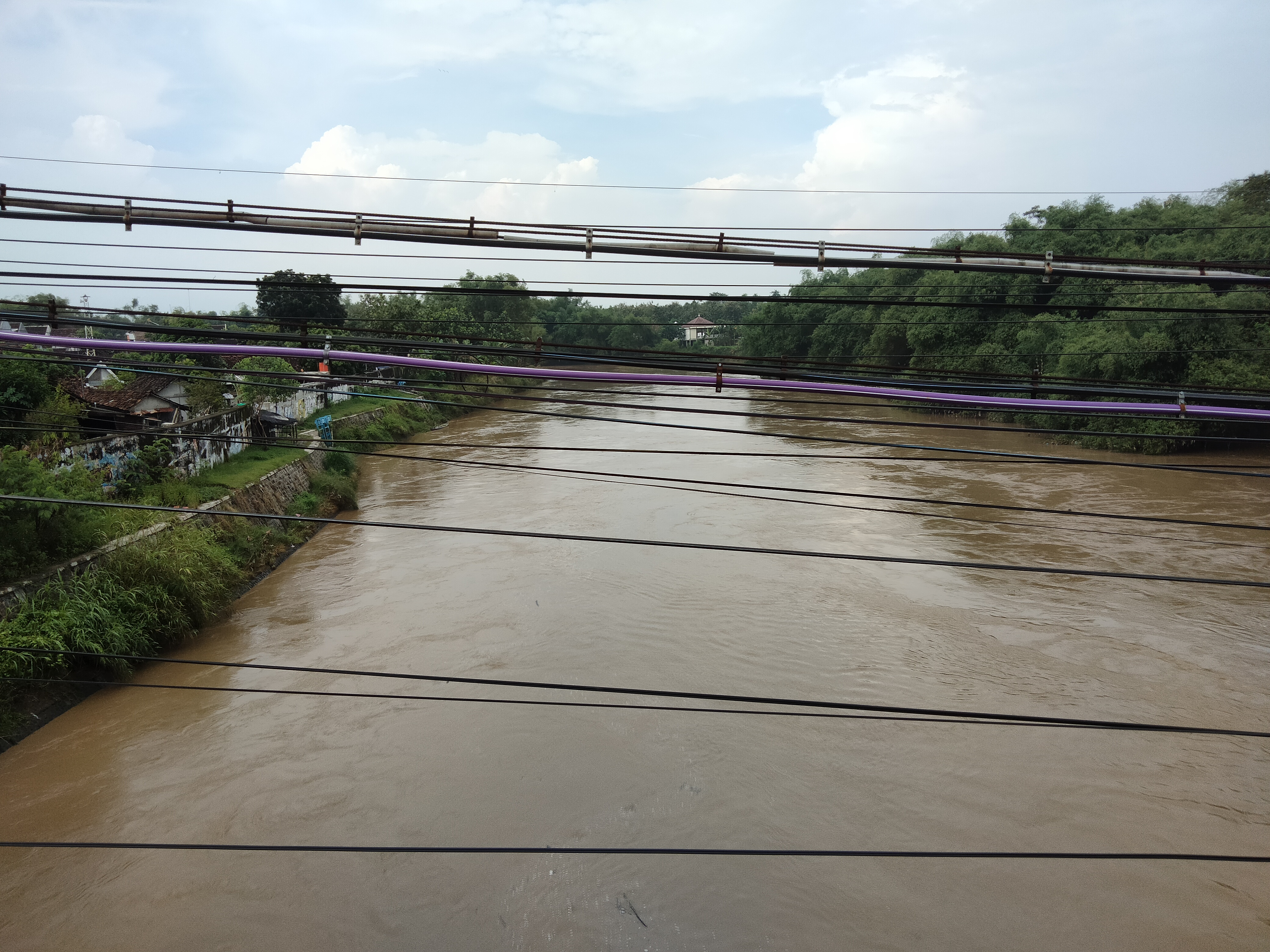

The Madiun River (Indonesian: Bengawan Madiun or Kali Madiun) is a river in East Java and Ngawi, Indonesia, about 500 km to the east of the capital Jakarta. It is the largest tributary of the Solo River. Its name indicates that it passes through the major city of Madiun, East Java, Indonesia. This river starts as several smaller tributaries converging near the city of Ponorogo, in particular the Kali Slahung, Kali Keyang, and Kali Sungkur. It eventually converges with the Solo River near the city of Ngawi.

== Historical note ==
In 1825, the Dutch East Indies soldiers built a fortress near the convergence of the Madiun and Solo rivers, to fight a local rebellion led by Diponegoro. The fortress was named Fort Van Den Bosch; known locally as Benteng Pendem Ngawi.

== Geography ==
The river flows entirely within the Province of East Java, passing through Ponorogo Regency, Madiun Regency, City of Madiun, Magetan Regency, and Ngawi Regency, with a savanna climate. The annual average temperature in the area is 26 °C. The warmest month is October when the average temperature is around 30 °C, and the coldest is January, at 24 °C. The wettest month is March, with an average of 546 mm of rainfall, and the driest is September, with 21 mm of rainfall.

For ages, the Madiun River has notoriously caused flooding during the rainy season. Every year the seasonal deluge submerges many fields and houses along the river banks, including some districts in Ponorogo Regency in the upper reaches and in the Ngawi Regency in the lower reaches. The high debit of water overflows to the Solo River, adding to the regular flooding in Bojonegoro Regency. During the dry season, the river becomes a tourist place for fishing or a place to mine sands for local people.

== Tourism ==
- Wana Wisata Grape at the Catur river (Grape river).

== See also ==
- List of drainage basins of Indonesia
- List of rivers of Indonesia
- List of rivers of Java
