= Tugu Kartonyono =

Monument in Ngawi, Indonesia

- Kartonyono Monument gold Ivory

General information
- Location: Ngawi, Indonesia; Yos Sudarso Street; Ahmad Yani Street; Basuki Rahmat Street; PB Sudirman Street
- Coordinates: 7°24′39″S 111°26′36″E
- Construction started: 1983
- Renovated: 30 June 2017
- Cost: IDR 3.1 billion

Height
- Height: 5 m (16 ft)

Tugu Kartonyono is a monument that is an icon of Ngawi City, Indonesia, located right in the middle of the intersection of the road with the same name. This monument also marks the heart of the city because of its central location.

The shape of this monument resembles an ancient elephant tusk that was then colored gold. The Kartonyono Monument was built in 1983. This area was formerly a three-way intersection before the new road, Jalan Basuki Rahmat was built.

== History ==
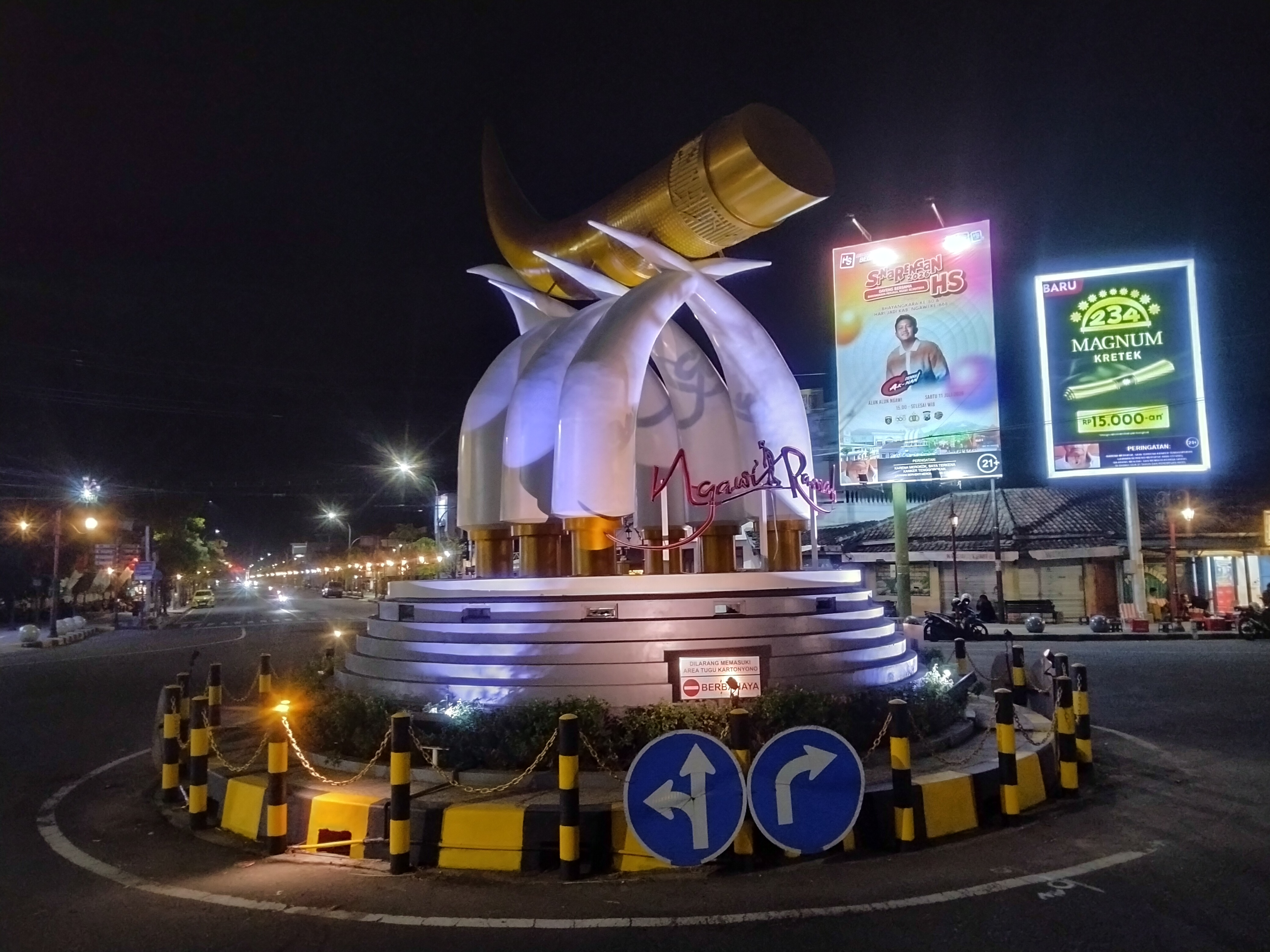
Kartonyono Ivory Monument at night

Name of Kartonyono itself is taken from the name of one of the village heads Margomulyo whose name is famous from his residence east of this monument before the new road named Jalan Basuki Rahmat was built. The village head's residence was evicted due to the construction of the Ngawi protocol road which connects the west corridor with the east, south with the north of the city. One of the bridges connecting this new road is called the new dungus bridge, replacing the old dungus bridge located east of the Ngawi town square so that mobility can be smooth.

Over time this monument has become a unique attraction because its shape still maintains its antique form, using an ancient elephant tusk as the main icon.
