= Gethuk =

Indonesian sweet cassava snack

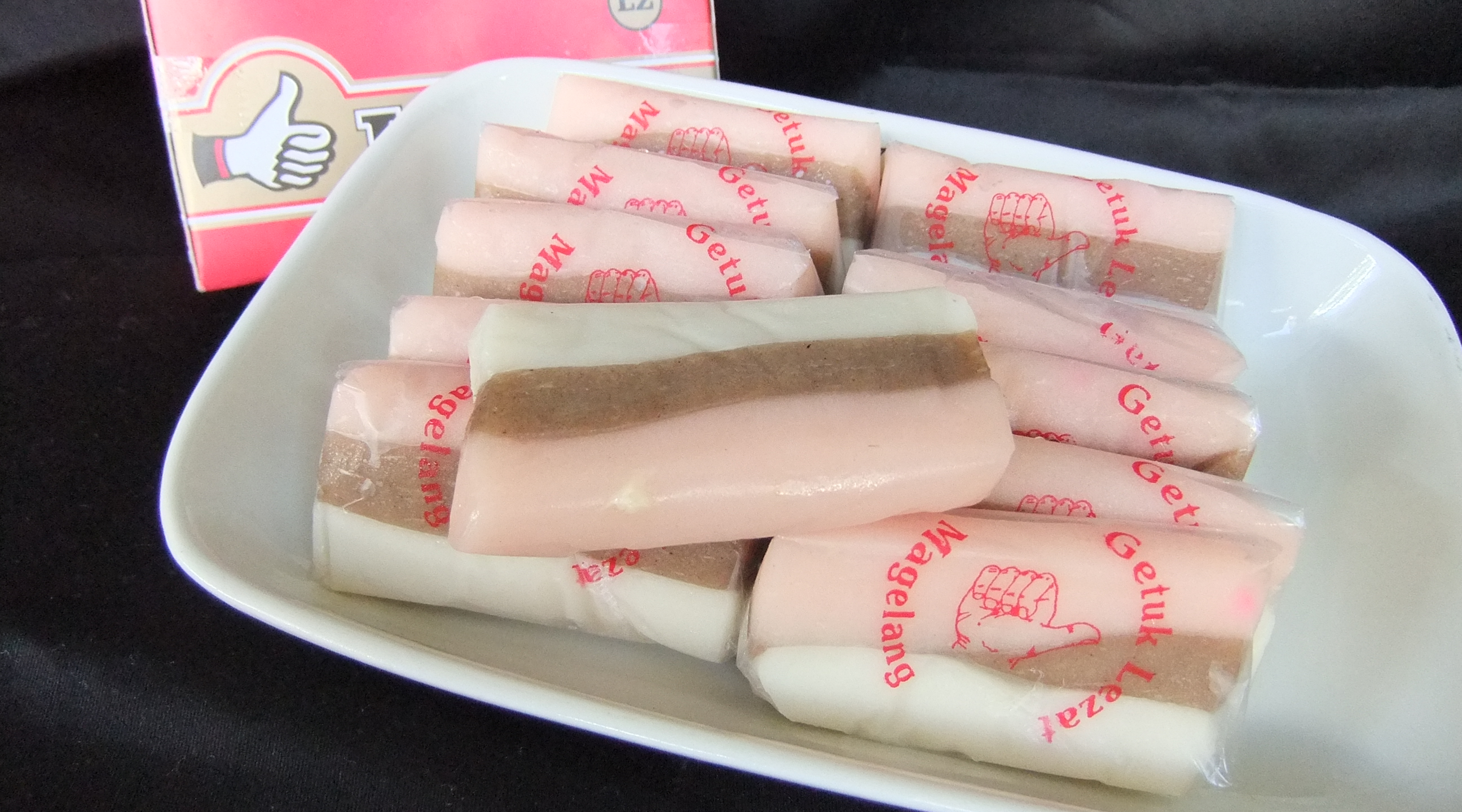
- Place of origin: Indonesia
- Region or state: Java in Indonesia, also popular in Southeast Asia
- Main ingredients: Cassava, coconut, sugar

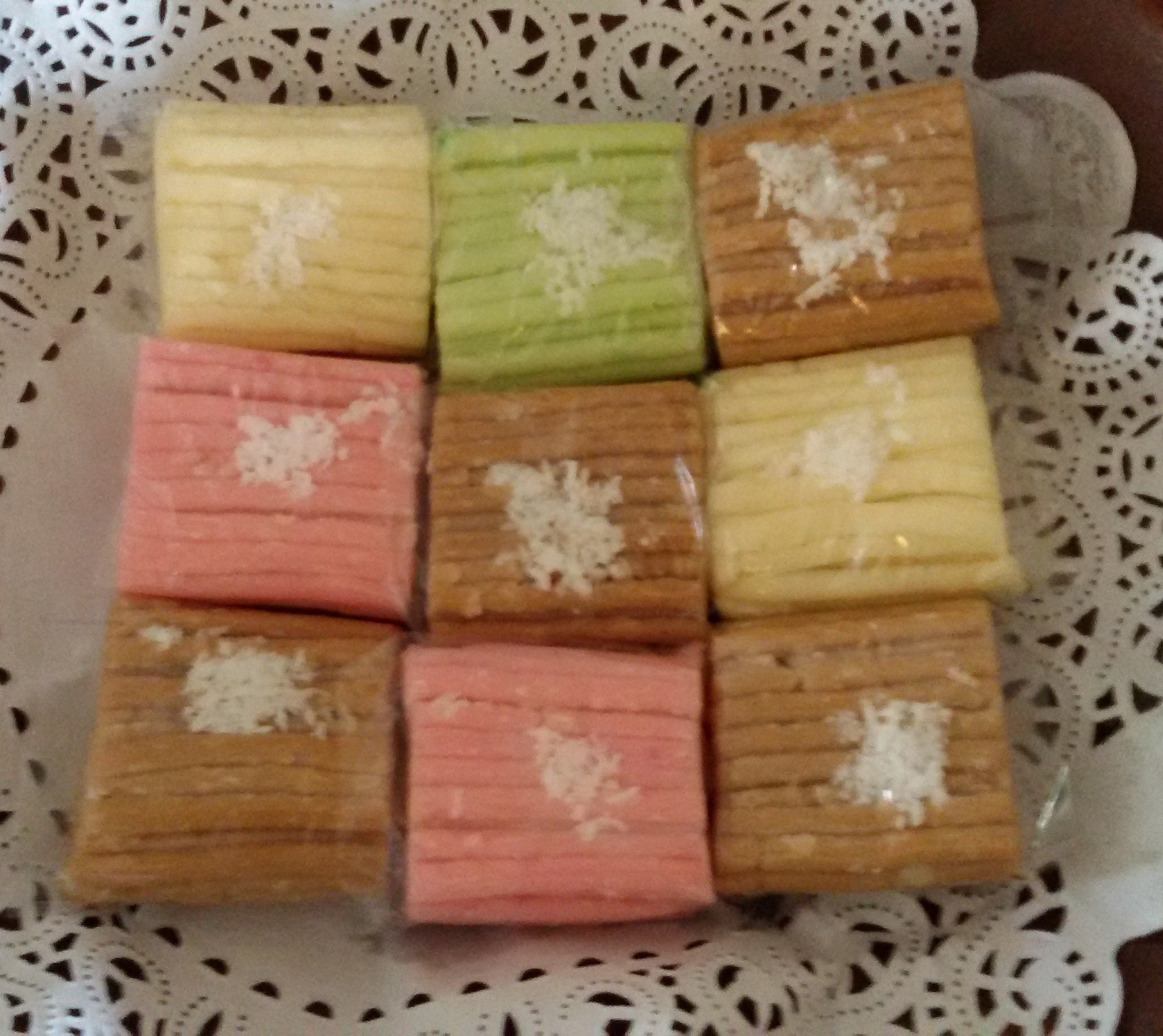
Gethuk lindri or sweet cassava snack from Java. The shape is different from other types of gethuk.

Gethuk is an Indonesian-Javanese dish made from cassava. The cassava is peeled, boiled, and mashed. Then it is mixed with grated coconut, sugar and small amounts of salt. Sugar can also be replaced with palm sugar to give it a brownish color and more distinctive taste.

Another method to make gethuk is by grinding it with a meat grinder and cutting it into cubes. This kind of getuk is also known as getuk lindri. While grinding butter, sugar, salt, and sometimes also milk powder, vanilla, and food coloring is added. Usually sold by a seller who goes around the neighborhood in East Java.

== See also ==
- Kue lapis
- Javanese cuisine
